= South Cambridgeshire District Council elections =

Local government elections in Cambridgeshire, England

South Cambridgeshire District Council was created as part of the 1972 local government reforms. The first elections to the new authority were held in the year 1973. From 1978 until 2016, one third of the council were elected each year, followed by one year without a poll. Since 2018, all members of the council are elected at once in a so-called 'all-out' election, after a decision made in 2015.

== Council elections ==
The number of seats held by each party at the conclusion of each election is noted in the table below.

Year	Conservative	Labour	Liberal Democrats (Note: Includes totals for the predecessors of the Liberal Democrats, the Liberal Party and SDP (both of which participated in the Alliance).)	Independents & Others	Council control after election
Local government reorganisation; council established (53 seats)
1973	0	8	3	42	Independent
New ward boundaries (55 seats) (Note: The District of South Cambridgeshire (Electoral Arrangements) Order 1975)
1976	4	8	3	40	Independent
1978	4	4	3	44	Independent
1979	3	1	4	47	Independent
1980	2	2	4	47	Independent
1982	5	2	7	41	Independent
1983	4	2	5	44	Independent
1984	4	2	4	45	Independent
1986	13	4	5	34	Independent
1987	19	3	3	30	Independent
1988	22	3	1	29	Independent
1990 (Note: Minor alterations to district boundaries: The Cambridgeshire, Essex, Hertfordshire and Lincolnshire (County Boundaries) Order 1989.)	21	5	1	28	Independent
1991	21	5	1	28	Independent
1992	24	5	4	22	No overall control
1994	22	6	7	20	No overall control
1995	16	8	10	21	No overall control
1996	13	10	11	21	No overall control
1998	15	9	13	18	No overall control
1999	15	9	15	16	No overall control
2000	20	5	15	15	No overall control
2002	22	6	16	11	No overall control
2003	23	4	16	12	No overall control
New ward boundaries (57 seats) (Note: The District of South Cambridgeshire (Electoral Changes) Order 2002 and The District of South Cambridgeshire (Electoral Changes) (Amendment) Order 2003.)
2004	23	4	16	12	No overall control
2006	25	1	19	12	No overall control
2007	29	1	17	10	Conservative
New ward boundaries (57 seats) (Note: Minor alterations to existing ward boundaries: The South Cambridgeshire (Electoral Changes) Order 2008.)
2008	32	1	15	9	Conservative
2010	29	1	20	7	Conservative
2011	31	1	18	7	Conservative
2012	33	1	16	7	Conservative
2014	35	1	13	8	Conservative
2015	38	1	11	7	Conservative
2016	36	1	14	6	Conservative
New ward boundaries (45 seats) (Note: The South Cambridgeshire (Electoral Changes) Order 2017.)
2018	11	2	30	2	Liberal Democrats
2022	8	0	37	0	Liberal Democrats
2026	2	0	43	0	Liberal Democrats

- Notes:

== District result maps ==
2004 results map

2006 results map

2007 results map

2008 results map

2010 results map

2011 results map

2012 results map

2014 results map

2015 results map

2016 results map

2018 results map

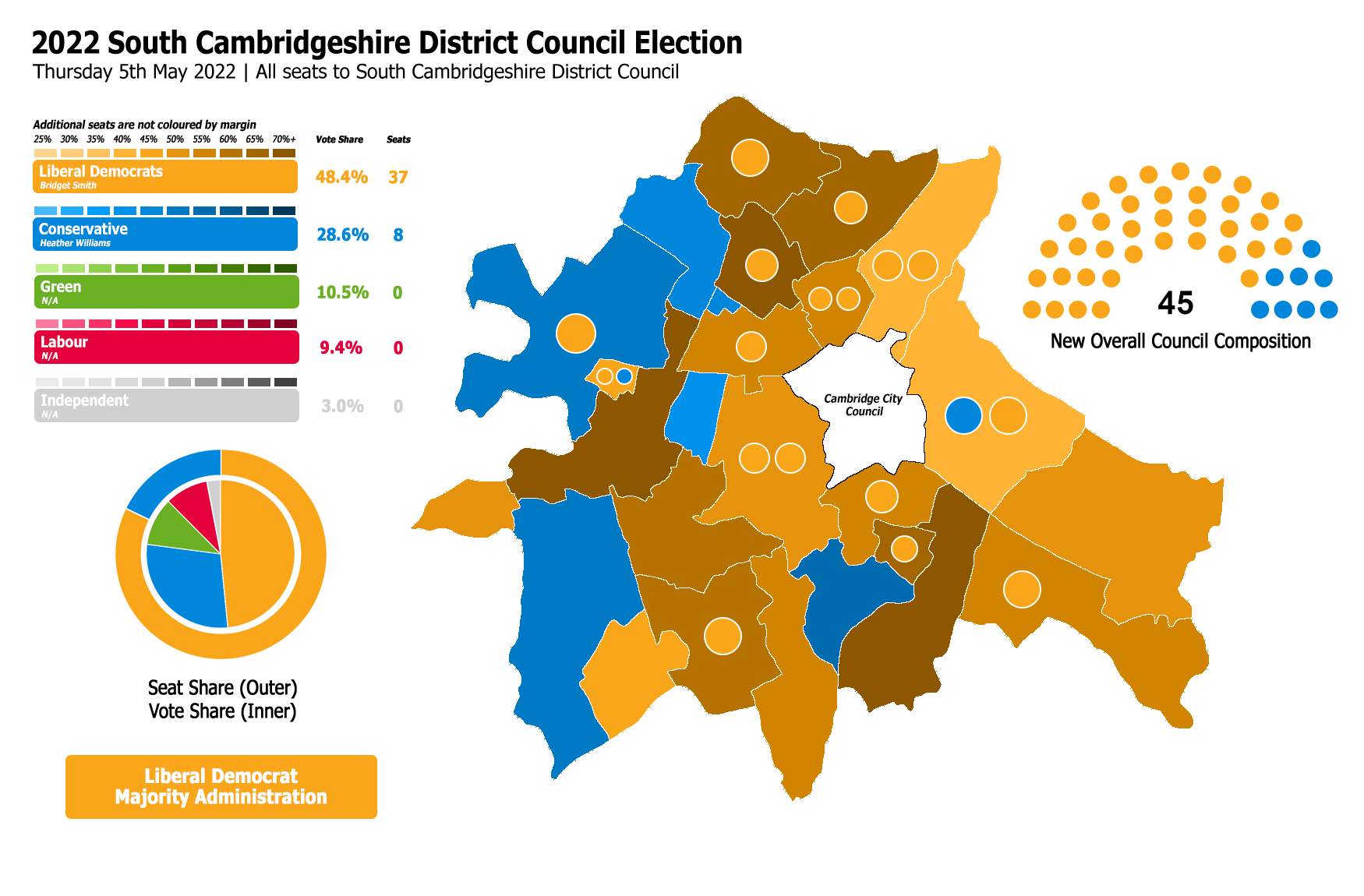
2022 results map

2026 results map

== By-election results ==
The following is an incomplete list of by-elections to South Cambridgeshire District Council.

=== 1998-2002 ===
Gamlingay By-Election 24 June 1999
Party	Candidate	Votes	%	±%
Liberal Democrats		343	51.7	−14.7
Conservative		321	48.3	+14.7
Majority		22	3.4	
Turnout		664		
Liberal Democrats hold		Swing		

Bar Hill By-Election 6 September 2001
Party	Candidate	Votes	%	±%
Conservative		unopposed		
Conservative hold		Swing		

=== 2002-2006 ===
Duxford & Ickleton By-Election 25 November 2004
Party	Candidate	Votes	%	±%
Liberal Democrats	John Frederick Williams	360	43.2	−5.7
Conservative	Robin Driver	342	41.0	−10.1
Independent	Lawrence de Villamil Wragg	132	15.8	+15.8
Majority		18	2.2	
Turnout		834	41.8	
Liberal Democrats gain from Conservative		Swing		

=== 2006-2010 ===
The Abingtons By-Election 19 October 2006
Party	Candidate	Votes	%	±%
Conservative	Anthony Orgee	496	65.5	+42.8
Liberal Democrats	John Williams	261	34.5	−29.1
Majority		235	31.0	
Turnout		757	43.4	
Conservative gain from Liberal Democrats		Swing		

Teversham By-Election 20 November 2008
Party	Candidate	Votes	%	±%
Liberal Democrats	Frances Aisha Roberts Amrani	269	38.6	N/A
Conservative	Colin Charles Barker	237	34.0	−66.0
Independent	Dave Kelleway	191	27.4	N/A
Majority		32	4.6	
Turnout		697	36.1	
Liberal Democrats gain from Conservative		Swing		

Balsham By-Election 4 June 2009
Party	Candidate	Votes	%	±%
Conservative	Julia Elizabeth Squier	988	50.6	−0.5
Liberal Democrats	Pauline Elizabeth Jarvis	852	43.7	−5.2
Labour	Grace Mary Everson	111	5.7	N/A
Majority		136	6.9	
Turnout		1,951	54.9	
Conservative hold		Swing		

=== 2010-2014 ===
Bourn By-Election 17 February 2011
Party	Candidate	Votes	%	±%
Conservative	Clayton James Hudson	874	56.2	+10.9
Liberal Democrats	Nick Spencer Glynn	345	22.2	−16.9
Labour	Gavin John Clayton	337	21.66	+10.2
Majority		529	33.9	
Turnout		1,556	24.7	
Conservative hold		Swing		

Balsham By-Election 2 May 2013
Party	Candidate	Votes	%	±%
Conservative	Andrew Fraser	731	50.3	−4.0
Liberal Democrats	John Batchelor	722	49.7	+21.5
Majority		9	0.6	
Turnout		1,453		
Conservative gain from Liberal Democrats		Swing		

Meldreth By-Election 2 May 2013
Party	Candidate	Votes	%	±%
Liberal Democrats	Susan van de Ven	607	66.8	+16.8
UKIP	David Kendrick	112	12.3	+5.3
Conservative	Duncan Bullivant	101	11.1	−22.0
Labour	Turlough Stone	89	9.8	+2.7
Majority		495	54.5	
Turnout		909		
Liberal Democrats hold		Swing		

Orwell and Barrington By-Election 2 May 2013
Party	Candidate	Votes	%	±%
Liberal Democrats	Aiden van de Weyer	428	56.8	+24.5
Conservative	Steven Sparkes	326	43.2	−13.7
Majority		102	13.5	
Turnout		754		
Liberal Democrats gain from Conservative		Swing		

Sawston By-Election 18 July 2013
Party	Candidate	Votes	%	±%
Conservative	Kevin Cuffley	477	46.8	+11.8
UKIP	Elizabeth Smith	233	22.9	+22.9
Labour	Mike Nettleton	199	19.5	−3.7
Liberal Democrats	Michael Kilpatrick	110	10.8	+6.2
Majority		244	23.9	
Turnout		1,019		
Conservative gain from Independent		Swing		

Comberton By-Election 21 November 2013
Party	Candidate	Votes	%	±%
Conservative	Tim Scott	378	63.4	+25.9
Liberal Democrats	Fay Boissieux	96	16.1	−36.6
Labour	Helen Haugh	74	12.4	+2.6
UKIP	Elizabeth Smith	48	8.1	+8.1
Majority		282	47.3	
Turnout		596		
Conservative gain from Liberal Democrats		Swing		

=== 2014-2018 ===
Bourn By-Election 17 September 2015
Party	Candidate	Votes	%	±%
Conservative	Simon Crocker	579	46.5	−9.9
Liberal Democrats	Jeni Sawford	247	19.8	+19.8
Labour	Gavin Clayton	235	18.9	−10.4
UKIP	Helene Green	121	9.7	+9.7
Green	Marcus Pitcaithly	64	5.1	−9.3
Majority		332	26.6	
Turnout		1,246		
Conservative hold		Swing		

Bourn By-Election 4 May 2017
Party	Candidate	Votes	%	±%
Conservative	Ruth Betson	1,426	49.7	+10.6
Liberal Democrats	Jeni Sawford	871	30.3	+14.4
Labour	Mark Hurn	573	20.0	−6.8
Majority		555	19.3	
Turnout		2,870		
Conservative hold		Swing		

=== 2018-2022 ===
Girton By-Election 6 May 2021
Party	Candidate	Votes	%	±%
Liberal Democrats	Corinne Mary Garvie	967	44.4	+32.5
Conservative	Khadijeh Zargar	621	28.5	+0.6
Labour	Marcelo Lima	344	15.8	−0.3
Green	Colin Cyril Coe	246	11.3	+1.7
Majority		346	15.9	
Turnout		2,178		
Liberal Democrats gain from Independent		Swing		

Harston and Comberton By-Election 6 May 2021
Party	Candidate	Votes	%	±%
Liberal Democrats	Fiona Whelan	1,785	43.6	−1.7
Conservative	Lorraine Mooney	1,459	35.6	+0.4
Labour	Michael Tierney	519	12.7	+1.7
Green	Colin Reynolds	335	8.2	−0.3
Majority		326	8.0	
Turnout		4,098		
Liberal Democrats hold		Swing		

Harston and Comberton By-Election 6 May 2021
Party	Candidate	Votes	%	±%
Liberal Democrats	Sally Hart	1,510	54.7	+2.0
Conservative	Tom Goldie	992	36.0	+5.8
Green	Paul Evans	256	9.3	+3.5
Majority		518	18.8	
Turnout		2,758		
Liberal Democrats hold		Swing		

Milton and Waterbeach By-Election 6 May 2021
Party	Candidate	Votes	%	±%
Liberal Democrats	Paul Bearpark	1,255	34.3	−1.6
Conservative	Clive Rabbett	1,069	29.2	+11.8
Labour	Jane Williams	915	25.0	+5.7
Green	Eleanor Crane	424	11.6	+5.2
Majority		186	5.1	
Turnout		3,663		
Liberal Democrats hold		Swing		

=== 2022-2026 ===
Longstanton By-Election 3 November 2022 (2 seats)
Party	Candidate	Votes	%	±%
Liberal Democrats	Natalie Warren-Green	578		
Conservative	Tom Bygott	566		
Liberal Democrats	Lawrence Zeegen	534		
Independent	Debbie Poyser	422		
Labour	Dan Greef	411		
Conservative	Khadijeh Zargar	394		
Labour	Anand Pillai	266		
Green	Silke Scott-Mance	169		
Green	Colin Coe	85		
Liberal Democrats hold		Swing		
Conservative gain from Liberal Democrats		Swing		

Cottenham By-Election 16 March 2023
Party	Candidate	Votes	%	±%
Liberal Democrats	Eileen Wilson	864	41.7	
Conservative	Frank Morris	678	32.7	
Labour	Tom Hingston	373	18.0	
Green	Oliver Fisher	107	5.2	
Independent	Jo Pilsworth	52	2.5	
Majority		186	9.0	
Turnout		2,074		
Liberal Democrats hold		Swing		

Histon and Impington By-Election 24 October 2024
Party	Candidate	Votes	%	±%
Liberal Democrats	James Rixon	942	38.7	
Independent	Edd Stonham	617	25.3	
Green	Kathryn Fisher	420	17.3	
Conservative	Clive Pelbrough-Power	283	11.6	
Labour	William Mason	172	7.1	
Majority		325	13.4	
Turnout		2,434		
Liberal Democrats hold		Swing		
