= 2018 South Cambridgeshire District Council election =

2018 UK local government election

South Cambridgeshire District Council election, 2018

Results of the 2018 South Cambridgeshire District Council election

Elections to South Cambridgeshire District Council were held on Thursday 3 May 2018 as part of the 2018 United Kingdom local elections. Forty five seats, making up the whole of South Cambridgeshire District Council, were up for election in twenty six wards. The council previously had 57 members, last elected by thirds in 2016, 2015 and 2014. Following a boundary review, there has been a reduction of twelve seats to 45 and the electoral pattern has changed from election by thirds to all out elections, meaning that all seats were up for election on this occasion.

In a surprise result, the Liberal Democrats took control of the council, winning 30 seats. The district had been controlled outright by the Conservative Party since the 2007 election.

== Summary ==
The list of candidates was published on 6 April 2018. Both the Conservative Party and the Labour Party fielded a full slate of 45 candidates, while the Liberal Democrats contested 41 seats. The Green Party had 26 candidates, and there were seven independent candidates. The United Kingdom Independence Party stood one candidate in Bar Hill.

There was media speculation in the build-up to the election that the Liberal Democrats could make a surprise breakthrough on the council. The Guardian identified South Cambridgeshire as a district where the Conservative Party's approach to Brexit may damage the party's appeal to "Tory Remain" voters who had predominantly voted to remain in the European Union in the 2016 referendum.

During the campaign, one of the Conservative candidates for the Fen Ditton and Fulbourn ward was suspended from the party after a number of offensive posts he had made on Twitter received national media attention. However he remained on the ballot paper as the deadline for withdrawals had passed.

== Results ==
2018 South Cambridgeshire District Council election
Party	Candidates	Seats	Gains	Losses	Net gain/loss	Seats %	Votes %	Votes	+/−
Liberal Democrats	41	30	N/A	N/A	▲16	66.7	38.5	37,668	
Conservative	45	11	N/A	N/A	▼25	24.4	34.1	33,284	
Labour	45	2	N/A	N/A	▲1	4.4	17.5	17,100	
Independent	7	2	N/A	N/A	▼4	4.4	5.5	5,382	
Green	25	0	N/A	N/A	Steady	0.0	4.4	4,264	
UKIP	1	0	N/A	N/A	Steady	0.0	<0.1	46	

== Results by ward ==
Balsham (one seat)
Party	Candidate	Votes	%	±%
Liberal Democrats	Geoff Harvey	659	47.5	
Conservative	Richard Turner	551	39.7	
Labour	Muhammad Shaheer	144	10.4	
Green	Linda Richardson	34	2.4	
Majority				
Turnout			47.8	
Liberal Democrats win (new seat)				

Bar Hill (one seat)
Party	Candidate	Votes	%	±%
Conservative	Bunty Waters	527	51.7	
Labour	Stuart Hilpert	234	22.9	
Green	Hayley Farnell	109	10.7	
Liberal Democrats	Stephanie Ness	104	10.2	
UKIP	Helene Green	46	4.5	
Majority				
Turnout			33.4	
Conservative win (new seat)				

Barrington (one seat)
Party	Candidate	Votes	%	±%
Liberal Democrats	Aidan van de Weyer	591	48.5	
Conservative	Simon Parrish	516	42.3	
Labour	John Harper	86	7.1	
Green	Michael King	26	2.1	
Majority				
Turnout			46.6	
Liberal Democrats win (new seat)				

Bassingbourn (one seat)
Party	Candidate	Votes	%	±%
Labour	Nigel Cathcart	583	52.1	
Conservative	David McCraith	393	35.1	
Green	Simon Saggers	143	12.8	
Majority				
Turnout			38.6	
Labour win (new seat)				

Caldecote (one seat)
Party	Candidate	Votes	%	±%
Liberal Democrats	Tumi Hawkins	691	58.0	
Conservative	Des O'Brien	450	37.8	
Labour	John Goodall	50	4.2	
Majority				
Turnout			45.5	
Liberal Democrats win (new seat)				

Cambourne (three seats)
Party	Candidate	Votes	%	±%
Conservative	Ruth Betson	1,038	48.8	
Conservative	Shrobona Bhattacharya	931	43.8	
Labour	Gavin Clayton	800	37.6	
Conservative	Evelyne Spanner	799	37.6	
Labour	Darren Macey	687	32.3	
Labour	Len Thornton	594	28.0	
Green	Marcus Pitcaithly	294	13.8	
Liberal Democrats	Paul Newns	277	13.0	
Liberal Democrats	Robert Pinsker	234	11.0	
Green	Michela Morleo	229	10.8	
Majority				
Turnout			30.6	
Conservative win (new seat)				
Conservative win (new seat)				
Labour win (new seat)				

Caxton & Papworth (two seats)
Party	Candidate	Votes	%	±%
Conservative	Mark Howell	1,083	62.1	
Conservative	Nick Wright	986	56.6	
Labour	Edith Hall	329	18.9	
Liberal Democrats	Peter Sandford	321	18.4	
Green	Gaynor Clements	274	15.7	
Labour	Richard Poynder	247	14.2	
Majority				
Turnout			36.4	
Conservative win (new seat)				
Conservative win (new seat)				

Cottenham (two seats)
Party	Candidate	Votes	%	±%
Liberal Democrats	Neil Gough	1,198	48.0	
Liberal Democrats	Eileen Wilson	1,092	43.8	
Conservative	Lynda Harford	799	32.0	
Conservative	Timothy Wotherspoon	746	29.9	
Labour	Adam Gledhill	349	14.0	
Independent	Frank Morris	258	10.3	
Labour	Mark McCormack	231	9.3	
Green	Colin Coe	168	6.7	
Majority				
Turnout			49.5	
Liberal Democrats win (new seat)				
Liberal Democrats win (new seat)				

Duxford (one seat)
Party	Candidate	Votes	%	±%
Liberal Democrats	Peter McDonald	615	49.6	
Conservative	Stephen Edwards	516	41.6	
Labour	Jackie Scott	110	8.9	
Majority				
Turnout			45.7	
Liberal Democrats win (new seat)				

Fen Ditton & Fulbourn (three seats)
Party	Candidate	Votes	%	±%
Liberal Democrats	John Williams	1,593	45.9	
Liberal Democrats	Claire Daunton	1,285	37.0	
Conservative	Graham Cone	1,227	35.3	
Conservative	Rob Turner	1,169	33.6	
Liberal Democrats	Mark Lunn	1,008	29.0	
Conservative	George Stoakley	810	23.3	
Labour	Tim Andrews	785	22.6	
Labour Co-op	Frances Amrani	687	19.8	
Labour	Cathie Rae	613	17.6	
Green	Oliver Fisher	329	9.5	
Green	Steve Bradshaw	245	7.1	
Majority				
Turnout			44.0	
Liberal Democrats win (new seat)				
Liberal Democrats win (new seat)				
Conservative win (new seat)				

Foxton (one seat)
Party	Candidate	Votes	%	±%
Independent	Deborah Roberts	630	47.0	
Conservative	Barbara Kettel	445	33.2	
Liberal Democrats	Giles Sanders	138	10.3	
Labour	Angela Patrick	127	9.5	
Majority				
Turnout			50.8	
Independent win (new seat)				

Gamlingay (one seat)
Party	Candidate	Votes	%	±%
Liberal Democrats	Bridget Smith	707	50.3	
Conservative	Harriet Gould	603	42.9	
Labour	Jenna Hegarty	96	6.8	
Majority				
Turnout			47.6	
Liberal Democrats win (new seat)				

Girton (two seats)
Party	Candidate	Votes	%	±%
Independent	Douglas De Lacey	853	48.7	
Conservative	Tom Bygott	688	39.3	
Labour	Jane Williams	397	22.7	
Conservative	Delowar Hossain	320	18.3	
Labour	Lee Taylor	300	17.1	
Liberal Democrats	Patrick Thouroude	295	16.8	
Green	Teal Riley	237	13.5	
Green	John Ranken	195	11.1	
Majority				
Turnout			43.7	
Independent win (new seat)				
Conservative win (new seat)				

Hardwick (one seat)
Party	Candidate	Votes	%	±%
Conservative	Grenville Chamberlain	499	54.1	
Liberal Democrats	James Hosking	228	24.7	
Labour	Mark Hurn	151	16.4	
Green	David Smith	44	4.8	
Majority				
Turnout			37.1	
Conservative win (new seat)				

Harston & Comberton (three seats)
Party	Candidate	Votes	%	±%
Liberal Democrats	Tony Mason	1,695	47.8	
Liberal Democrats	Philip Allen	1,640	46.2	
Liberal Democrats	Ian Sollom	1,638	46.2	
Conservative	Lina Joseph	1,314	37.0	
Conservative	Timothy Scott	1,310	36.9	
Conservative	Joshua Vanneck	1,071	30.2	
Labour	Chris Coleridge	410	11.6	
Labour	Laurens Drost	390	11.0	
Labour	Roger Tomlinson	389	11.0	
Green	Seigo Robinson	319	9.0	
Majority				
Turnout			48.3	
Liberal Democrats win (new seat)				
Liberal Democrats win (new seat)				
Liberal Democrats win (new seat)				

Histon & Impington (three seats)
Party	Candidate	Votes	%	±%
Liberal Democrats	Pippa Heylings	1,508	40.8	
Liberal Democrats	Martin Cahn	1,217	32.9	
Liberal Democrats	Stephen Hunt	1,159	31.3	
Independent	Neil Davies	1,155	31.2	
Independent	Edd Stonham	895	24.2	
Labour	Huw Jones	842	22.8	
Labour	Phil Gooden	775	21.0	
Conservative	Louise Daily	695	18.8	
Labour	Geoff Moore	669	18.1	
Conservative	Helga Cole	581	15.7	
Conservative	Othman Cole	506	13.7	
Green	Alison Wood	242	6.5	
Green	Darren Cotterell	202	5.5	
Green	Carrie Evans	116	3.1	
Majority				
Turnout			43.7	
Liberal Democrats win (new seat)				
Liberal Democrats win (new seat)				
Liberal Democrats win (new seat)				

Linton (two seats)
Party	Candidate	Votes	%	±%
Liberal Democrats	Henry Batchelor	1,150	47.1	
Liberal Democrats	John Batchelor	1,096	44.8	
Conservative	Enid Bald	981	40.1	
Conservative	Chris Negus	804	32.9	
Labour	Mike Murray	293	12.0	
Labour	Ernie Turkington	219	9.0	
Green	Paul Richardson	207	8.5	
Majority				
Turnout			43.3	
Liberal Democrats win (new seat)				
Liberal Democrats win (new seat)				

Longstanton (two seats)
Party	Candidate	Votes	%	±%
Liberal Democrats	Sarah Cheung Johnson	831	50.7	
Liberal Democrats	Alex Malyon	703	42.9	
Conservative	Simon Edwards	691	42.2	
Conservative	Roger Hall	551	33.6	
Labour	Polly Gunsman	156	9.5	
Labour	Ed Stokes	138	8.4	
Green	Sandra Archer	104	6.3	
Majority				
Turnout			43.5	
Liberal Democrats win (new seat)				
Liberal Democrats win (new seat)				

Melbourn (two seats)
Party	Candidate	Votes	%	±%
Liberal Democrats	Jose Hales	1,306	53.7	
Liberal Democrats	Philippa Hart	1,272	52.3	
Conservative	Irene Bloomfield	747	30.7	
Conservative	Mike Linnette	708	29.1	
Labour	Beverley Cottrell	280	11.5	
Labour	Turlough Stone	200	8.2	
Green	Paul Evans	143	5.9	
Majority				
Turnout			39.6	
Liberal Democrats win (new seat)				
Liberal Democrats win (new seat)				

Milton & Waterbeach (three seats)
Party	Candidate	Votes	%	±%
Liberal Democrats	Anna Bradnam	1,403	41.4	
Liberal Democrats	Hazel Smith	1,289	38.0	
Liberal Democrats	Judith Rippeth	1,163	34.3	
Independent	Peter Johnson	820	23.2	
Labour	Elizabeth McWilliams	754	22.2	
Labour	Gareth Wright	746	22.0	
Labour	James Bull	736	21.7	
Conservative	George Walker	682	20.1	
Conservative	Clive Rabbett	663	19.6	
Conservative	Christine Smith Bull	640	18.9	
Green	Eleanor Crane	251	7.4	
Green	Damian Glasfurd-Brown	161	4.7	
Green	Tom Lachlan-Cope	139	4.1	
Majority				
Turnout			44.1	
Liberal Democrats win (new seat)				
Liberal Democrats win (new seat)				
Liberal Democrats win (new seat)				

Over & Willingham (two seats)
Party	Candidate	Votes	%	±%
Liberal Democrats	Bill Handley	1,115	46.5	
Liberal Democrats	Dawn Percival	989	41.2	
Independent	Ray Manning	771	32.2	
Conservative	Brian Burling	636	26.5	
Conservative	Pippa Corney	549	22.9	
Labour	Fern Lane	229	9.5	
Labour	Alex Tiley	185	7.7	
Majority				
Turnout			43.9	
Liberal Democrats win (new seat)				
Liberal Democrats win (new seat)				

Sawston (two seats)
Party	Candidate	Votes	%	±%
Liberal Democrats	Brian Milnes	1,123	51.7	
Liberal Democrats	Clare Delderfield	901	41.5	
Conservative	David Bard	747	34.4	
Conservative	Kevin Cuffley	690	31.8	
Labour	Rob Grayston	471	21.7	
Labour	Anand Pillai	292	13.5	
Majority				
Turnout		4224	39.3	
Liberal Democrats win (new seat)				
Liberal Democrats win (new seat)				

Shelford (two seats)
Party	Candidate	Votes	%	±%
Liberal Democrats	Peter Fane	1,339	48.3	
Liberal Democrats	Nick Sample	1,240	44.8	
Conservative	Benjamin Shelton	908	32.8	
Conservative	Charlie Nightingale	839	30.3	
Labour	Mike Nettleton	466	16.8	
Labour	Mark Toner	346	12.5	
Green	Sophi Berridge	270	9.7	
Majority				
Turnout			49.3	
Liberal Democrats win (new seat)				
Liberal Democrats win (new seat)				

Swavesey (one seat)
Party	Candidate	Votes	%	±%
Conservative	Sue Ellington	558	60.0	
Labour	Thomas Mayer	247	26.6	
Liberal Democrats	Teresa Griffiths	93	10.0	
Green	John Turner	32	3.4	
Majority				
Turnout			35.1	
Conservative win (new seat)				

The Mordens (one seat)
Party	Candidate	Votes	%	±%
Conservative	Heather Williams	603	46.8	
Liberal Democrats	Sebastian Kindersley	598	46.4	
Labour	Alix Valentine	87	6.8	
Majority				
Turnout			47.5	
Conservative win (new seat)				

Whittlesford (one seat)
Party	Candidate	Votes	%	±%
Conservative	Peter Topping	714	63.3	
Labour	Philippa MacGarry	180	15.9	
Liberal Democrats	Caitriona Quigley	164	14.5	
Green	Linda Whitebread	70	6.2	
Majority				
Turnout			42.7	
Conservative win (new seat)				

== By-elections ==
Whittlesford, 27th February 2020
Party	Candidate	Votes	%	±%
Conservative	Richard Williams	526	55.2	−8.1
Liberal Democrats	James Hobro	427	44.8	+30.3
Majority		99	10.4	−37.0
Turnout		953	35.7	−7.0
Conservative hold		Swing		

Girton, 6th May 2021
Party	Candidate	Votes	%	±%
Liberal Democrats	Corinne Garvey	967	44.4	+27.6
Conservative	Khadijeh Zargar	621	28.5	+10.2
Labour	Marcelo Lima	344	15.8	−6.9
Green	Colin Coe	246	11.3	−2.2
Majority		46	15.9	N/A
Turnout		2,178	53.6	+9.9
Liberal Democrats gain from Independent		Swing		

Harston & Comberton, 6th May 2021
Party	Candidate	Votes	%	±%
Liberal Democrats	Fiona Whelan	1,785	43.6	−2.6
Conservative	Lorraine Mooney	1,459	35.6	−1.4
Labour	Michael Tierney	519	12.7	+1.1
Green	Colin Reynolds	335	8.2	−0.8
Majority		326	8.0	
Turnout		4,098	51.0	+2.7
Liberal Democrats hold		Swing		

Melbourn, 6th May 2021
Party	Candidate	Votes	%	±%
Liberal Democrats	Sally Hart	1,510	54.7	+2.4
Conservative	Tom Goldie	992	36.0	+5.3
Green	Paul Evans	256	9.3	+3.4
Majority		518	18.7	
Turnout		2,758	43.2	+3.6
Liberal Democrats hold		Swing		

Milton & Waterbeach, 6th May 2021
Party	Candidate	Votes	%	±%
Liberal Democrats	Paul Bearpark	1,255	34.3	−3.7
Conservative	Clive Rabbett	1,069	29.2	+9.6
Labour	Jane Williams	915	25.0	+2.8
Green	Eleanor Crane	424	11.6	+4.2
Majority		186	5.1	
Turnout		3,663	44.2	+0.1
Liberal Democrats hold		Swing		
