= Girton, Cambridgeshire =

Village in Cambridgeshire, England

Coordinates: 52.233°N 0.083°E

Girton
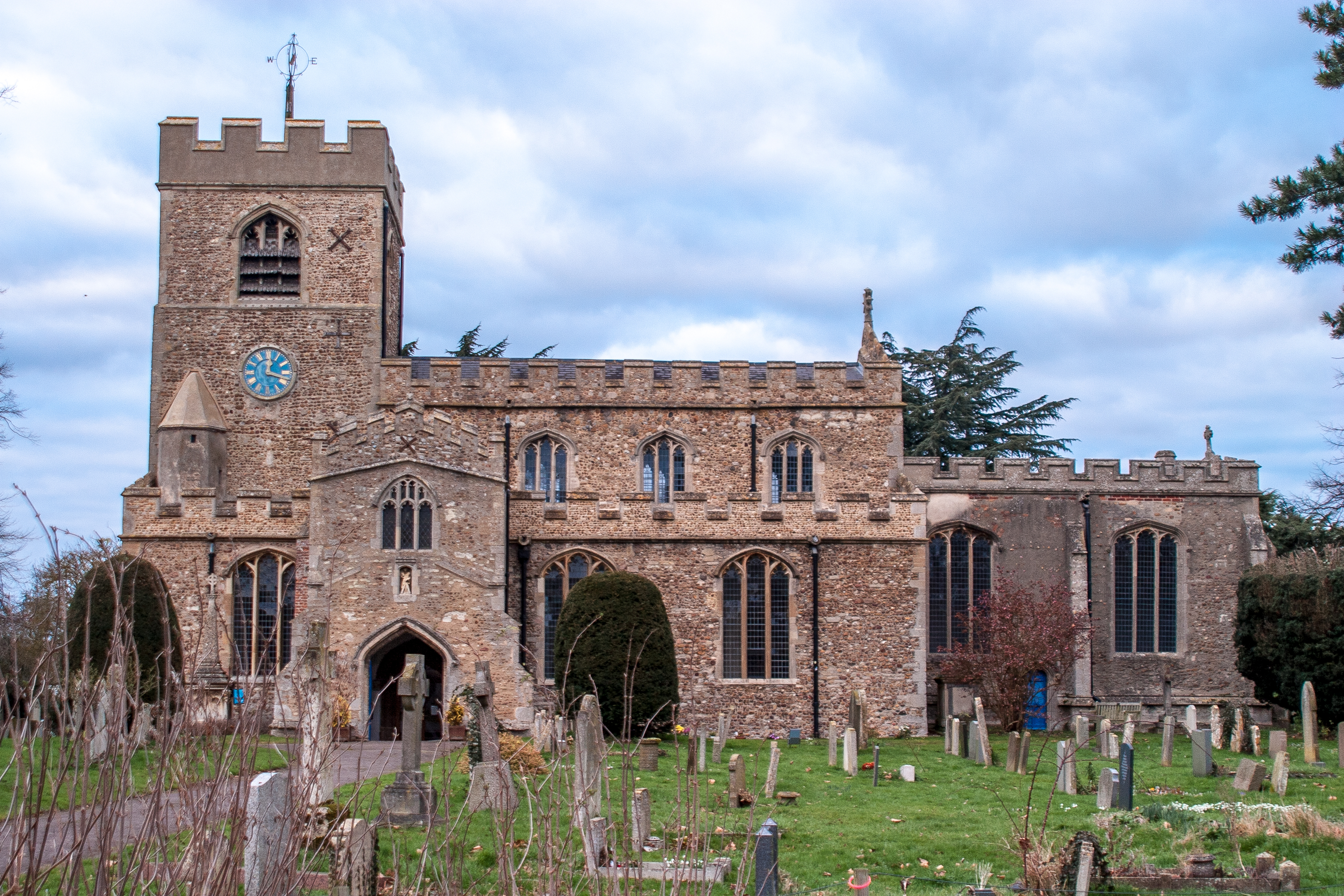
- St Andrew's Church in February 2017

- Location within Cambridgeshire
- Interactive map of Girton
- Population: 4,559 (2011)
- OS grid reference: TL422615
- District: South Cambridgeshire
- Shire county: Cambridgeshire
- Region: East
- Country: England
- Sovereign state: United Kingdom
- Post town: Cambridge
- Postcode district: CB3
- Dialling code: 01223
- Police: Cambridgeshire
- Fire: Cambridgeshire
- Ambulance: East of England
- UK Parliament: South Cambridgeshire
- Website: www.girton-cambs.org.uk

Girton is a village and civil parish of about 1,600 households, and 4,500 people, in Cambridgeshire, England. It lies about 2 miles (3 km) to the northwest of Cambridge, and is the home of Girton College, a constituent college of the University of Cambridge.

Listed as Grittune in around 1060 and Grittune in the Domesday Book, the village's name is derived from the Old English grēot + tūn meaning "farmstead or village on gravelly ground", as the settlement was formed on a gravel ridge.

== History ==
Girton has a long history, and has been home to a poor settlement for more than 2000 years. The parish lies on the Via Devana, the Roman road, and a cemetery with at least 225 burials between the 2nd century AD and the early Anglo Saxon period was found near Girton College in 1880. In addition, traces of agriculture from the late Bronze Age and Roman period were found to the north of the village in 1975. A selection of Anglo-Saxon items are stored in the collection of Girton College.

Before the 20th century most of the village was devoted to arable farming, following Enclosure in 1808.

In 1934 the parish acquired 58 acres (23 hectares) of land from neighbouring Histon and the Cotton manorial estate. Further land was gained from Histon and Impington in 1953, and the village subsumed the small hamlet of Howes into its parish. The parish boundary was further adjusted in 1985 to align with the recently completed M11 motorway, with Girton relinquishing over 100 acres (40 hectares) to Madingley parish. The completion of the motorway created an interchange with the A428, A14 and A1307.

== Church ==
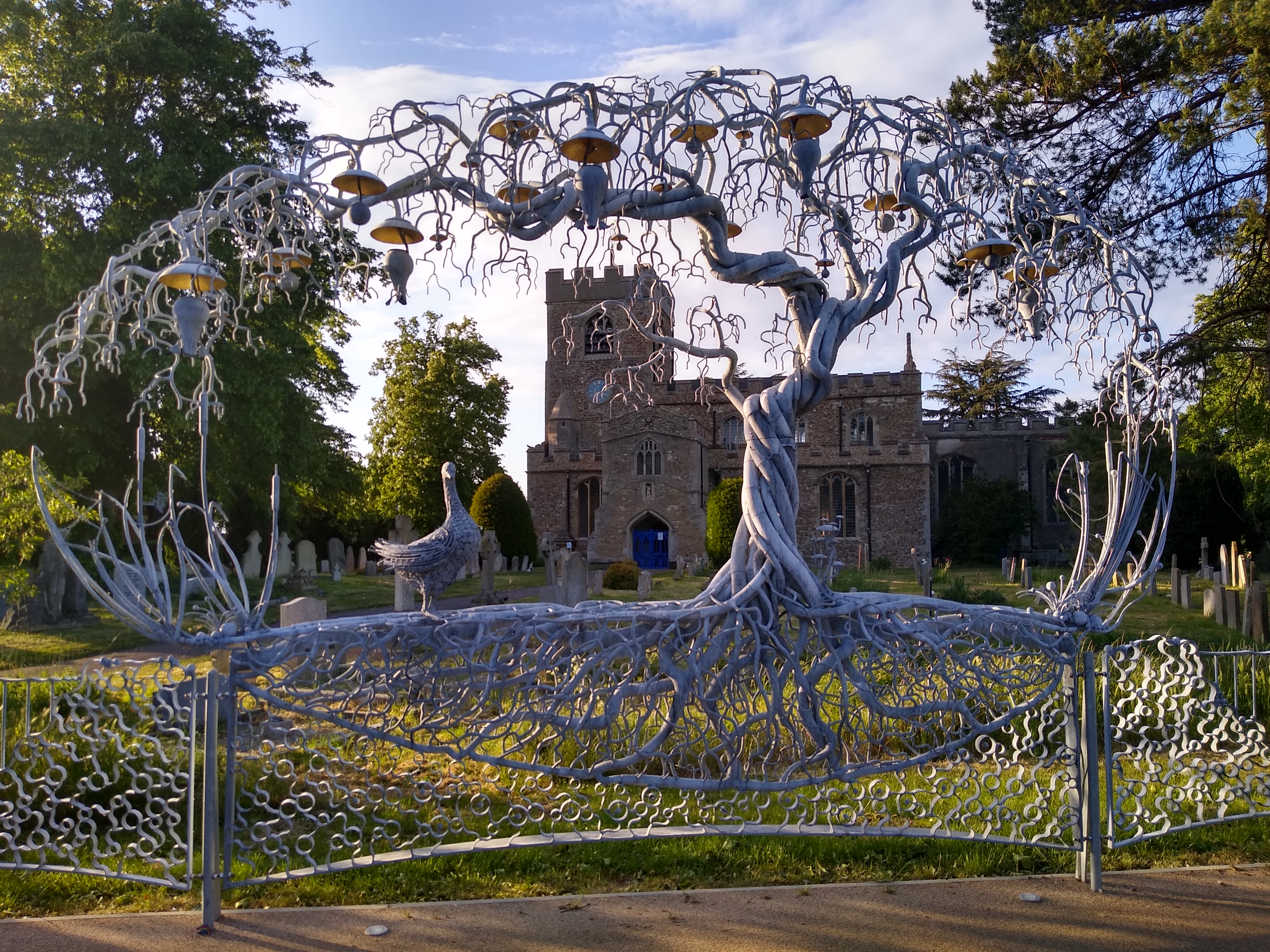
The Golden Goose Sculpture Railings in front of St Andrew's Church

The parish church has been dedicated to Saint Andrew since at least 1240. Part of the west tower contains stones that were probably part of an earlier 11th-century church on the site, and there are parts of 13th century construction still in evidence, but the present building was largely rebuilt in the 15th and 16th centuries. The church was owned by Ramsey Abbey from the 12th century until the Dissolution of the Monasteries.

People buried in the churchyard of St Andrews include botanist Agnes Arber, academic Ellen Wordsworth Darwin, and Elisabeth Hertz, wife of Heinrich Hertz.

A Baptist church was built in the village in 1860.

== Village sign ==
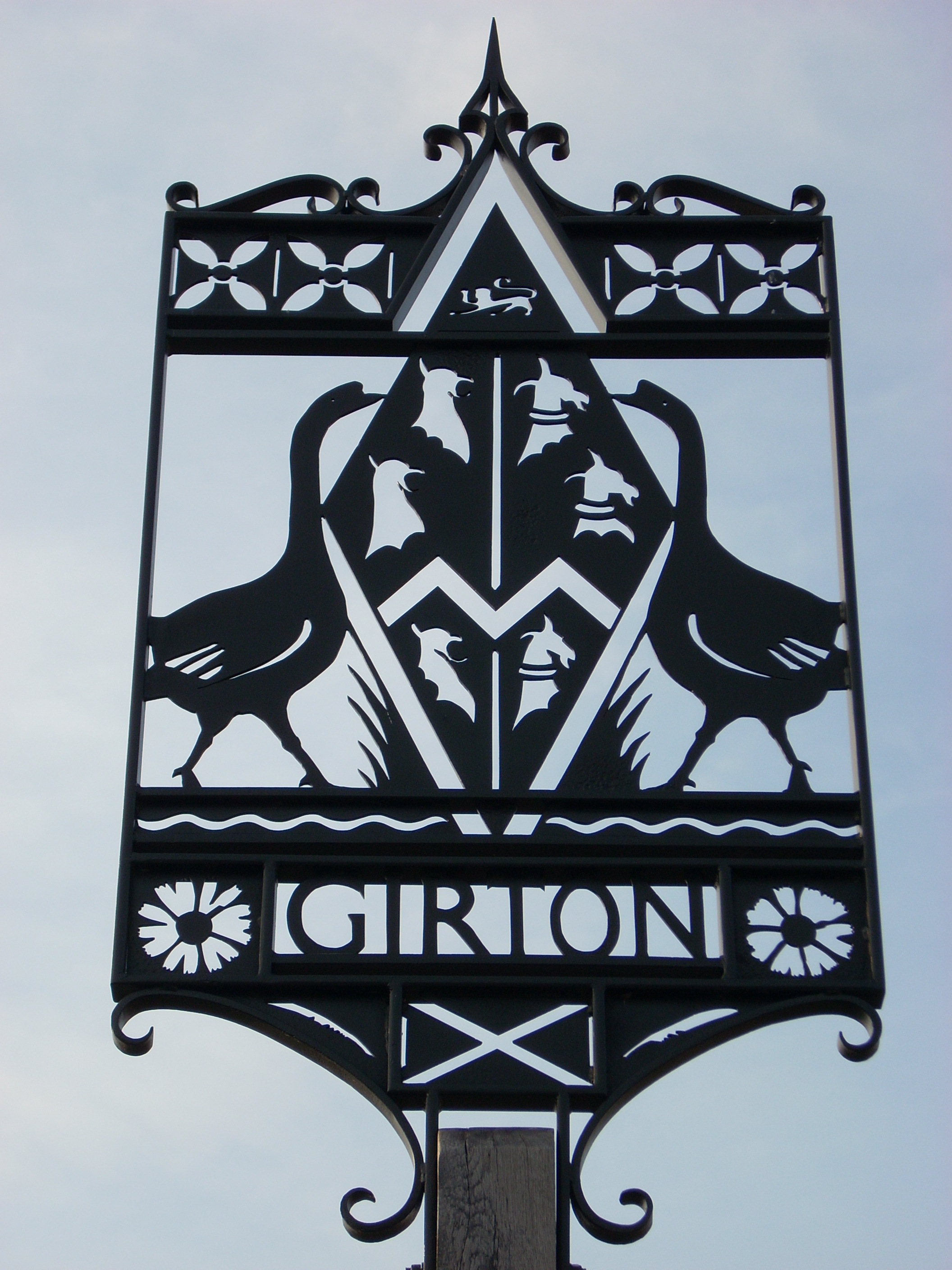
The village sign

The current village sign, situated on the corner of Redgate Road and Cambridge Road, was erected in 1985 after a fund-raising campaign. Designed by Denis Cheason and made by Barry Sharman, the silhouette design is formed from a number of separate images. The top part of design is based on a Roman belt discovered in a burial ground near Girton College. The centre is derived from the family coat of arms of Anne-Maria Cotton, who endowed the first Girton village school, together with geese, kept at Washpit, that provided quills for use in the University of Cambridge. The flowers near the village's name are corn marigolds which were once common in the village, and at the base is the cross of Saint Andrew to whom the parish church is dedicated.

== Village life ==
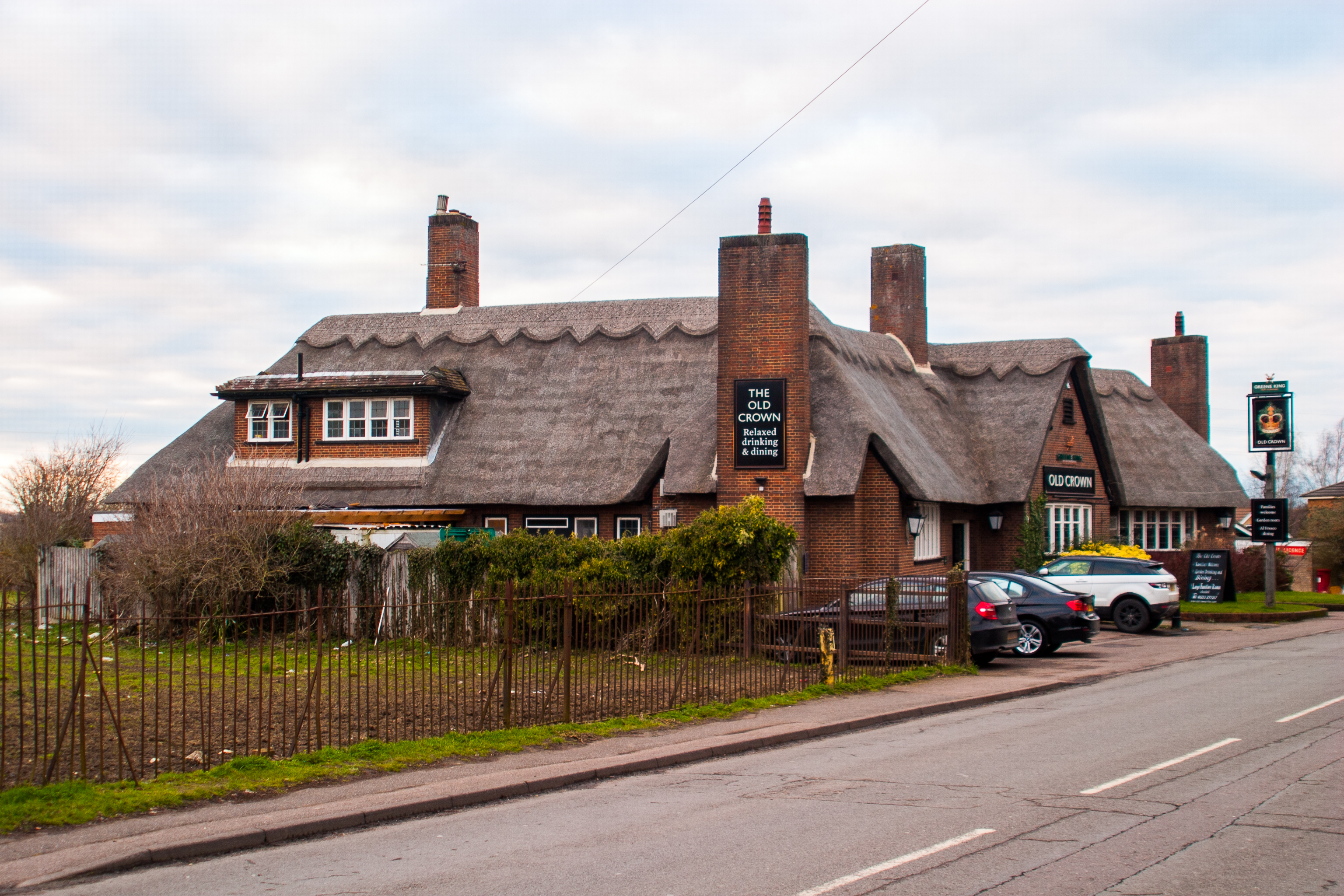
The Old Crown pub

Girton has three public houses: the Old Crown opened in around 1840, The George (formerly the George and Dragon) which was opened by a blacksmith in the 1850s, and The Traveller's Rest a modern addition on Huntingdon Road on the outskirts of Cambridge. The village's first pub, the White Horse, was opened in around 1760 but closed in the late 20th century. The village hosts the black squirrel, a rare variant of the grey squirrel.

== Education ==
Girton College, a constituent college of the University of Cambridge, is situated within the village. Formed in 1869 under the name of the College for Women at Benslow House, it was originally based in Hitchin in Hertfordshire, before moving to its current site in 1873, at which time it took its current name. Until 1976 it admitted only women.

The village also contains a primary school, Girton Glebe. Built in 1951, it replaced the village's original school, built in 1845, as well as Gretton School, a special school for pupils with autism spectrum disorders.

== Governance ==
Girton Parish Council was established in 1894, and consists of 15 members as of 2022. Girton is part of the Girton ward, along with Dry Drayton and Madingley, and returns two councillors to South Cambridgeshire District Council. Between 1894 and 1974 it was part of Chesterton rural district. It is part of the Bar Hill ward, along with Bar Hill, Dry Drayton, and Lolworth, of Cambridgeshire County Council. For Westminster representation, Girton is part of the St Neots and Mid Cambridgeshire constituency. Prior to the 2023 review of Westminster constituencies it was part of the South Cambridgeshire constituency.

== People from Girton ==
- Emma Turner (1866-1940) ornithologist and pioneering bird photographer
- Vic Watson (1897-1988) West Ham United's record goal scorer
