= 2026 South Cambridgeshire District Council election =

2026 English local government election

- 7 May 2026

All 45 seats to South Cambridgeshire District Council 23 seats needed for a majority
- Turnout: 47.26%

	First party	Second party	Third party
Leader	Bridget Smith	Heather Williams	N/A
Party	Liberal Democrats	Conservative	Independent
Leader since	2018	2020	N/A
Leader's seat	Gamlingay	The Mordens	N/A
Last election	37 seats, 52.1%	8 seats, 29.2%	0 seats, 1.8%
Seats before	35 (Note: Includes the vacant seat in Milton & Waterbeach last held by the Liberal Democrats.)	8	2
Seats after	43	2	0
Seat change	▲6	▼6	Steady
Popular vote	51,513	20,503	205
Percentage	42.8%	17.0%	0.2%
Swing	▼9.3%	▼12.2%	▼1.6%
- Results by ward
Leader before election
Bridget Smith
Liberal Democrats
Leader after election
Bridget Smith
Liberal Democrats

The 2026 South Cambridgeshire District Council election was held on 7 May 2026, alongside the other local elections across the United Kingdom being held on the same day, to elect all 45 members of South Cambridgeshire District Council in Cambridgeshire, England.

The council was under Liberal Democrat majority control prior to the election. The Liberal Democrats increased their majority at this election, winning 43 of the 45 seats on the council.

== Background ==
In 2022, the Liberal Democrats retained control of the council.

== Council composition ==
After 2022 election		Before 2026 election	
Party	Seats	Party	Seats
Liberal Democrats	37	Liberal Democrats	34
Conservative	8	Conservative	9
Independent	0	Independent	1
Vacant	N/A	Vacant	1

Changes 2022–2026:

- September 2022:
  - Sarah Cheung Johnson (Liberal Democrats) and Alex Malyon (Liberal Democrats) resign – by-election held November 2022
  - Daniel Lentell (Liberal Democrats) leaves party to sit as an independent
- November 2022: Tom Bygott (Consverative) and Natalie Warren-Green (Liberal Democrats) win by-election
- February 2023: John Loveluck (Liberal Democrats) dies – by-election held March 2023
- March 2023: Eileen Wilson (Liberal Democrats) wins by-election
- September 2024: Pippa Heylings (Liberal Democrats) resigns – by-election held October 2024
- October 2024: James Rixon (Liberal Democrats) wins by-election
- April 2025: Mark Howell (Conservative) leaves party to sit as an independent
- December 2025: Judith Rippeth (Liberal Democrats) resigns – seat left vacant until 2026 election
- March 2026: Mark Howell has rejoined the Conservative group

== Election result ==
2026 South Cambridgeshire District Council election
Party	Candidates	Seats	Gains	Losses	Net gain/loss	Seats %	Votes %	Votes	+/−
Liberal Democrats	45	43	9	0	+9	95.6	42.7	51,513	-9.4
Reform	45	0	0	0	0	0	17.3	20,901	N/A
Conservative	45	2	0	7	-7	4.4	17.2	20,803	-12.0
Green	45	0	0	0	0	0	16.5	19,943	+10.3
Labour	39	0	0	0	0	0	6.1	7,307	-4.7
Independent	2	0	0	1	-1	0	0.2	205	-1.6

== Ward results ==
An asterisk (*) denotes an incumbent.

=== Balsham ===
Balsham (one seat)
Party	Candidate	Votes	%	±%
Liberal Democrats	Geoff Harvey*	631	42.3	−11.9
Conservative	John Biggs	351	23.5	−7.6
Reform	David Burrell	317	21.2	N/A
Green	Bob Ensch	154	10.3	+3.4
Labour	Martin Parker Dixon	40	2.7	−5.1
Majority		280	18.8	−4.3
Turnout		1493	50.32	+6.87
Liberal Democrats hold		Swing		

=== Bar Hill ===
Bar Hill (one seat)
Party	Candidate	Votes	%	±%
Liberal Democrats	William Scantlebury	531	38.3	−5.3
Conservative	Bunty Waters*	358	25.8	−22.4
Reform	Paul Pallan	337	24.3	N/A
Green	Rebecca Seabrook-Tedd	103	7.4	−0.8
Labour	Graeme Hodgson	59	4.3	N/A
Majority		173	12.5	
Turnout		1388	46.37	+7.39
Liberal Democrats gain from Conservative		Swing		

=== Barrington ===
Barrington (one seat)
Party	Candidate	Votes	%	±%
Liberal Democrats	Aidan Van de Weyer*	661	43.0	−21.2
Reform	Jim Huntington	347	22.6	N/A
Conservative	Colin French	294	19.1	−16.7
Green	Clare Rodgers	172	11.2	N/A
Labour	Clare Sinclair	64	4.2	N/A
Majority		314		20.4
Turnout		1538	50.69	−1.46
Liberal Democrats hold		Swing		

=== Bassingbourn ===
Bassingbourn (one seat)
Party	Candidate	Votes	%	±%
Liberal Democrats	Adam Bostanci	614	44.8	−0.7
Reform	Stephanie Wright	368	26.8	N/A
Conservative	Christopher Meakin	254	18.5	−10.7
Green	Joseph Price	88	6.4	−13.0
Labour	Karen Livingstone	48	3.5	−2.4
Majority		246	18.0	
Turnout		1372	44.43	+2.25
Liberal Democrats hold		Swing		

=== Caldecote ===
Caldecote (one seat)
Party	Candidate	Votes	%	±%
Liberal Democrats	John Jefferies	662	43.8	−30.5
Reform	Terence Cross	314	20.8	N/A
Conservative	Chiranjeevi Sandi	211	14.0	−11.7
Green	Tom Postlethwaite	153	10.1	N/A
Independent	Guy Lachlan	125	8.3	N/A
Labour	Judith Tustian	45	3.0	N/A
Majority		348	23.0	
Turnout		1510	49.6	+6.23
Liberal Democrats hold		Swing		

=== Cambourne ===
Cambourne (three seats)
Party	Candidate	Votes	%	±%
Liberal Democrats	Helene Leeming*	1,582	42.3	−4.6
Liberal Democrats	Michael Booth	1,394	37.3	−6.7
Liberal Democrats	Amber Thomas	1,336	35.7	+2.1
Conservative	Shrobona Bhattacharya*	1192	31.9	−2.8
Conservative	Daniel White	807	21.6	−6.3
Conservative	Nick Rana-Beadle	741	19.8	−7.7
Reform	Donavan Bangs	665	17.8	N/A
Green	Gavin Clayton	652	17.4	N/A
Reform	Trevor Jarman	554	14.8	N/A
Reform	Paul Jobling	549	14.7	N/A
Green	Rob Denison	387	10.3	N/A
Green	Marcus Pitcaithly	380	10.2	−2.2
Labour	Timothy Hayes	190	5.1	−16.1
Labour	David Williams	151	4.0	N/A
Independent	Dalia Heggo	80	2.1	N/A
Turnout		3741	42.13	+4.01
Liberal Democrats hold		Swing		
Liberal Democrats hold		Swing		
Liberal Democrats gain from Conservative		Swing		

Gavin Clayton had previously served as a Labour councillor 2018-2022.

=== Caxton & Papworth ===
Caxton & Papworth (two seats)
Party	Candidate	Votes	%	±%
Liberal Democrats	Peter Sandford*	1,011	44.1	+3.6
Liberal Democrats	Chris Poulton	989	43.1	+12.2
Reform	Charles Barclay	506	22.0	N/A
Reform	James Earl Pickford	470	20.5	N/A
Conservative	Mandy Smith	429	18.7	−32.6
Conservative	Leslie Charles Edwards	402	17.5	−23.8
Green	Jane Turner	270	11.8	−10.0
Green	Tagl	193	8.4	N/A
Labour	Andy Perkins	119	5.2	N/A
Turnout		2295	46.83	+7.89
Liberal Democrats hold		Swing		
Liberal Democrats gain from Conservative		Swing		

=== Cottenham ===
Cottenham (two seats)
Party	Candidate	Votes	%	±%
Liberal Democrats	Eileen Wilson*	1,138	42.4	−26.6
Liberal Democrats	Yasmin Deter	994	37.0	−23.5
Green	Colin Coe	511	19.0	+0.7
Green	Laura Cain	503	18.7	N/A
Conservative	Nigel Bolitho	453	16.9	−5.4
Reform	James Cochrane	425	15.8	N/A
Reform	Fredrick Hargreaves	402	15.0	N/A
Conservative	Linda Morris	396	14.8	−5.6
Labour	Thomas Hingston	243	9.1	N/A
Labour	Gethin Sanger	190	7.1	N/A
Turnout		2684	47.63	+4.92
Liberal Democrats hold		Swing		
Liberal Democrats hold		Swing		

=== Duxford ===
Duxford (one seat)
Party	Candidate	Votes	%	±%
Liberal Democrats	Peter McDonald*	677	49.7	−26.7
Reform	Peter Young	270	19.8	N/A
Conservative	Samuel Betz	198	14.5	−9.1
Green	Tim Pavelin	175	12.9	N/A
Labour	David Dobson	41	3.0	N/A
Majority		407	29.9	
Turnout		1361	48.62	+7.17
Liberal Democrats hold		Swing		

=== Fen Ditton & Fulbourn ===
Fen Ditton & Fulbourn (three seats)
Party	Candidate	Votes	%	±%
Liberal Democrats	Carla Hofman*	1,462	36.5	+3.7
Liberal Democrats	Chloe Wills-Eve	1,376	34.3	−6.0
Liberal Democrats	Vince Farrar	1,343	33.5	+1.6
Green	Steve Bradshaw	742	18.5	−0.2
Reform	Colin Barker	736	18.4	N/A
Green	Elizabeth Whitebread	733	18.3	N/A
Labour	Tim Andrews	657	16.4	−10.4
Green	Jacob Gray	634	15.8	N/A
Reform	Lukasz Lakomy	634	15.8	N/A
Conservative	Ian Crowson	618	15.4	−21.3
Reform	Ciprian Sandy	616	15.4	N/A
Conservative	Karen French	596	14.9	−9.2
Conservative	Lee Martin	561	14.0	−9.6
Labour	Chris Bailey	540	13.5	−10.1
Labour	Angela Platt	508	12.7	−8.4
Turnout		4007	46.12	+1.38
Liberal Democrats hold		Swing		
Liberal Democrats hold		Swing		
Liberal Democrats gain from Conservative		Swing		

=== Foxton ===
Foxton (one seat)
Party	Candidate	Votes	%	±%
Liberal Democrats	James Hobro*	743	48.3	−7.7
Reform	Liz Miller	342	22.3	N/A
Conservative	Donald Douglas	270	17.6	−26.4
Green	Luca Ercole	147	9.6	N/A
Labour	Lavinia Pugh	35	2.3	N/A
Majority		401	16.0	
Turnout		1537	54.88	−2.28
Liberal Democrats hold		Swing		

=== Gamlingay ===
Gamlingay (one seat)
Party	Candidate	Votes	%	±%
Liberal Democrats	Bridget Smith*	821	53.4	−0.2
Reform	Derek Hill	496	32.2	N/A
Conservative	Diane Myers	147	9.6	−34.4
Green	Rosanna Mahmood	52	3.4	N/A
Labour	Giordi Salvy	22	1.4	N/A
Majority		325	21.2	
Turnout		1538	50.41	−0.25
Liberal Democrats hold		Swing		

=== Girton ===
Girton (two seats)
Party	Candidate	Votes	%	±%
Liberal Democrats	Corinne Garvie*	1,182	55.2	−2.7
Liberal Democrats	Richard Stobart*	995	46.5	+5.8
Green	Clare Gray	351	16.4	−0.6
Conservative	Stephen George	336	15.7	−16.1
Conservative	Jennifer Stewart	316	14.8	−5.9
Green	Matthew Gibley	299	14.0	N/A
Reform	Paula Brown	220	10.3	N/A
Labour	Sarah Johnson	208	9.7	−11.1
Reform	Timothy Scott	186	8.7	N/A
Turnout		2142	51.31	+0.30
Liberal Democrats hold		Swing		
Liberal Democrats hold		Swing		

=== Hardwick ===
Hardwick (one seat)
Party	Candidate	Votes	%	±%
Liberal Democrats	Catherine Hubbard	584	41.7	+9.3
Conservative	Lisa Nieto*	380	27.1	−17.1
Reform	Helen Mason	232	16.5	N/A
Green	Hugh Clough	165	11.8	N/A
Labour	Joe Beastall	41	2.9	−20.5
Majority		204	14.6	+26.4
Turnout		1402	48.38	+7.33
Liberal Democrats gain from Conservative		Swing		

=== Harston & Comberton ===
Harston & Comberton (three seats)
Party	Candidate	Votes	%	±%
Liberal Democrats	Lisa Redrup*	1,778	45.0	−8.6
Liberal Democrats	Laurence Damary-Homan	1,607	40.7	−10.8
Liberal Democrats	Ariel Cahn*	1,605	40.6	−1.8
Conservative	Lorraine Mooney	763	19.3	−11.7
Conservative	Pauline Joslin	716	18.1	−13.5
Conservative	Joshua Vanneck	644	16.3	−12.9
Green	Aled Jones	632	16.0	−8.2
Green	Lucy Young	625	15.8	N/A
Reform	Duncan Bullivant	604	15.3	N/A
Reform	Emily Morris-Lowe	601	15.2	N/A
Reform	Henry Bullivant	592	15.0	N/A
Green	Michelle Taylor	589	14.9	N/A
Labour	Joseph Shortmoor	303	7.7	−9.4
Labour	Helen Haugh	278	7.0	N/A
Labour	Peter Slavny	214	5.4	N/A
Turnout		3950	47.49	+1.63
Liberal Democrats hold		Swing		
Liberal Democrats hold		Swing		
Liberal Democrats hold		Swing		

=== Histon & Impington ===
Histon & Impington (three seats)
Party	Candidate	Votes	%	±%
Liberal Democrats	James Rixon*	1,974	48.4	−10.2
Liberal Democrats	Martin Cahn*	1,698	41.7	−2.7
Liberal Democrats	Geo Sebastian	1,669	41.0	+5.8
Green	Edd Stonham	1,497	36.7	+6.3
Green	Adam Morgan	1,201	29.5	+13.2
Green	Paul Tarita	1072	26.3	N/A
Reform	John Abbott	482	11.8	N/A
Reform	Chris Boulton	478	11.7	N/A
Reform	Mandy Kawalko	414	10.2	N/A
Conservative	Mark Stuart	345	8.5	−8.3
Conservative	Joshua Willis	304	7.5	−5.6
Conservative	Jayasimha Berumgudem	301	7.4	−3.8
Labour	Isaac Rawlings	246	6.0	−14.7
Labour	Simon Patenall	222	5.4	−11.8
Turnout		4075	47.86	+5.40
Liberal Democrats hold		Swing		
Liberal Democrats hold		Swing		
Liberal Democrats hold		Swing		

Edd Stonham had previously been a Lib Dem councillor 2010-2012, an independent councillor 2012-2018 and an unsuccessful independent candidate 2018-2024. In early 2026 he joined the Green Party.

=== Linton ===
Linton (two seats)
Party	Candidate	Votes	%	±%
Liberal Democrats	Henry Batchelor*	1,393	48.6	−8.8
Liberal Democrats	John Batchelor*	1,369	47.8	−9.6
Reform	Sarah Jane Hurcum	600	20.9	N/A
Reform	Merrie Mannassi	543	19.0	N/A
Conservative	Sean Williams	464	16.2	−11.9
Conservative	Yorsh Naidoo	361	12.6	−10.9
Green	Nathan Banks	324	11.3	+0.9
Green	Katy Ensch	313	10.9	N/A
Labour	Ernie Turkington	126	4.4	−1.6
Labour	Mike Murray	124	4.3	−6.0
Turnout		2864	49.16	+6.75
Liberal Democrats hold		Swing		
Liberal Democrats hold		Swing		

=== Longstanton ===
Longstanton (two seats)
Party	Candidate	Votes	%	±%
Liberal Democrats	Natalie Warren-Green*	1,120	41.8	−29.8
Liberal Democrats	Sunita Hansraj	1,020	38.1	−25.7
Conservative	Tom Bygott*	557	20.8	−2.1
Reform	Alison Elcox	484	18.1	N/A
Conservative	Tristan Pithers	449	16.8	−1.5
Reform	Liam Varnam	443	16.5	N/A
Green	Lucy Mance	421	15.7	N/A
Green	Silke Scott-Mance	339	12.3	N/A
Labour	Dominic Brigstocke	171	6.4	N/A
Labour	Clare Wilson	154	5.8	−7.8
Turnout		2677	42.22	+6.37
Liberal Democrats hold		Swing		
Liberal Democrats hold		Swing		

Incumbent Tom Bygott had been elected at a by-election in 2022 but the seat had been won by Lib Dems in the routine election earlier that same year.

Sunita Hansraj had been a Liberal Democrat Councillor in Histon & Impington 2022-2026 but stood in Longstanton.

=== Melbourn ===
Melbourn (two seats)
Party	Candidate	Votes	%	±%
Liberal Democrats	Jose Hales*	1,554	49.3	−13.2
Liberal Democrats	Sally Ann Hart*	1,549	49.1	−12.5
Reform	Lee Bovington	811	25.7	N/A
Reform	Phyllis Smith	719	22.8	N/A
Conservative	Mark Arnold	446	14.1	−11.5
Conservative	Julian Leigh	424	13.5	−8.1
Green	Simon Copley	270	8.6	−2.8
Green	Max Schwiening	268	8.5	N/A
Labour	James Bull	86	2.7	−5.7
Labour	Bobby Ford	74	2.3	N/A
Turnout		3152	47.46	+7.54
Liberal Democrats hold		Swing		
Liberal Democrats hold		Swing		

=== Milton & Waterbeach ===
Milton & Waterbeach (three seats)
Party	Candidate	Votes	%	±%
Liberal Democrats	Anna Bradnam*	1,607	44.8	+0.1
Liberal Democrats	Paul Bearpark*	1,530	42.7	+0.2
Liberal Democrats	Laura Macleod	1,331	37.1	−0.7
Green	Ellie Crane	696	19.4	+0.4
Labour	Elizabeth McWilliams	660	18.4	−13.2
Reform	Ann Hodson	600	16.7	N/A
Reform	Natania Goldrich	572	16.0	N/A
Reform	Ron Sharp	553	15.4	N/A
Green	Oli Fisher	500	14.0	N/A
Labour	Gareth Wright	455	12.7	−15.8
Conservative	Gail Arnold	436	12.2	−9.8
Green	Joe Welford	428	11.9	N/A
Conservative	Frank Morris	411	11.5	−8.5
Conservative	Ge Huang	338	9.4	−8.5
Labour	Mary Perkins	315	8.8	−14.9
Turnout		3854	42.64	+2.27
Liberal Democrats hold		Swing		
Liberal Democrats hold		Swing		
Liberal Democrats hold		Swing		

=== Over & Willingham ===
Over & Willingham (two seats)
Party	Candidate	Votes	%	±%
Liberal Democrats	James Hutchcraft	1,221	46.7	−20.2
Liberal Democrats	Aisha Rashid	1,093	41.8	−11.9
Reform	Robert Fairbrother	598	22.9	N/A
Reform	Michael Smith	561	21.5	N/A
Conservative	Mark MacDonald	451	17.2	−8.8
Conservative	Graham Waters	391	15.0	−10.0
Green	Jacob Denison	331	12.7	N/A
Green	Colin Reynolds	246	9.4	N/A
Labour	Ian Hunter	154	5.9	−4.8
Turnout		2610	44.34	+4.73
Liberal Democrats hold		Swing		
Liberal Democrats hold		Swing		

=== Sawston ===
Sawston (two seats)
Party	Candidate	Votes	%	±%
Liberal Democrats	Brian Milnes*	1,217	48.0	−20.2
Liberal Democrats	Ed Sanders	1,021	40.3	−16.7
Reform	Mark Chater	545	21.5	N/A
Reform	Graham Harrison	485	19.1	N/A
Green	Chloe Balhatchet	448	17.7	N/A
Green	Daniel Clark	353	13.9	N/A
Conservative	Pamela Douglas	313	12.3	−13.5
Conservative	Ben Shelton	309	12.2	−10.0
Labour	Anand Pillai	177	7.0	−8.8
Turnout		2536	47.26	+9.7
Liberal Democrats hold		Swing		
Liberal Democrats hold		Swing		

=== Shelford ===
Shelford (two seats)
Party	Candidate	Votes	%	±%
Liberal Democrats	Mark Lunn	1,206	37.8	−21.5
Liberal Democrats	Farhan Hussain	1,160	36.3	−7.7
Green	Miranda Fyfe	1,151	36.0	+13.8
Green	Lee Denison	988	30.9	N/A
Conservative	Angela Niblett	486	15.2	−18.8
Conservative	Rebecca Shiret	459	14.4	−18.3
Reform	John Lamble	325	10.2	N/A
Reform	Brigitta Naunton	319	10.0	N/A
Labour	Nick Gay	105	3.3	N/A
Labour	Yvonne Nobis	86	2.7	N/A
Turnout		3193	55.67	+7.84
Liberal Democrats hold		Swing		
Liberal Democrats hold		Swing		

=== Swavesey ===
Swavesey (one seat)
Party	Candidate	Votes	%	±%
Liberal Democrats	Vivien Biggs	482	36.7	+2.9
Conservative	Susan Ellington*	424	32.3	−14.2
Reform	Karl Lattion	212	16.1	N/A
Green	Phil Cohen	152	11.6	−8.1
Labour	Barbara Mills	44	3.3	N/A
Majority		58	4.4	
Turnout		1314	43.76	+6.20
Liberal Democrats gain from Conservative		Swing		

=== The Mordens ===
The Mordens (one seat)
Party	Candidate	Votes	%	±%
Conservative	Heather Williams*	950	60.2	+9.4
Liberal Democrats	James Stuart	279	17.7	−24.5
Reform	Josh Johnson	206	13.1	N/A
Green	Frankie Brook	113	7.2	+0.2
Labour	Daniel Greef	29	1.8	N/A
Majority		671	42.5	
Turnout		1577	56.76	+1.72
Conservative hold		Swing		

=== Whittlesford ===
Whittlesford (one seat)
Party	Candidate	Votes	%	±%
Conservative	Richard Williams*	751	52.6	−4.5
Liberal Democrats	Sarah Vowler	304	21.3	−21.6
Reform	Clare Hill	168	11.8	N/A
Green	Sophi Berridge	122	8.5	N/A
Labour	Claire Downie	83	5.8	N/A
Majority		447	31.3	
Turnout		1428	55.76	+9.36
Conservative hold		Swing		
