= Peter Sarris =

British historian and former councillor

Peter Sarris is a British and Cypriot historian of late antiquity who is currently a professor at the University of Cambridge. He has published extensively on the history of the Middle Ages, particularly the reign of Justinian I. He also served as a councillor in the Cambridge City Council from 2014 to 2018.

== Early life and family ==
Sarris was born to a British mother and a Greek Cypriot father who met each other as teenagers in the 1950s, during the 1955–59 uprising against British rule. His great-uncle was a Greek nationalist who was one of the demonstrators who participated in the burning of the British governor's residence in Nicosia during the 1931 anti-British revolt in Cyprus. He was born in St Albans.

== Education and career ==
He was educated at St Albans School and continued his studies at Balliol College, Oxford, specializing in Medieval and Byzantine history. Sarris then became a prize fellow at All Souls College, Oxford, following his graduation from Balliol College. In 2000, he moved to Cambridge and became a lecturer at the University of Cambridge where he is currently Professor of Late Antique, Medieval and Byzantine Studies. Sarris is also a fellow of both Trinity College and the Royal Historical Society.

Sarris has published extensively on the history of the Middle Ages. In 2011, his book Empires of Faith: The Fall of Rome to the Rise of Islam, 500–700 on the period following the fall of Rome and the rise of Islam was published by Oxford University Press. His book Justinian: Emperor, Soldier, Saint was published by Basic Books in 2023, and was described by classicist Clifford Ando in the The Times Literary Supplement as "an unerring guide to the activity of the emperor and to the world that he was conditioned to see." The book was awarded the International Hellenic Prize for the "best book published in English relating to, or inspired by, Hellenic civilisation" in 2023.

== Politics and views ==
In the 2013 local elections, Sarris stood as a Labour Party candidate for the division of Newnham in the Cambridgeshire County Council. However, he narrowly lost to the Liberal Democrats' candidate Lucy Nethsingha. He stood again as a Labour Co-op candidate in the 2014 local elections, this time running in the East Chesterton division of the Cambridge City Council. During the campaign, Sarris came under fire for calling a pensioner "gaga" and questioning if she was even alive on his Twitter account. While he initially claimed that his account had been hacked, Sarris later clarified that someone else, a housemate, had used his account. He also apologized to the pensioner. Sarris was elected by ten votes, and served in the Cambridge City Council from 22 May 2014 to 4 May 2018. He also unsuccessfully ran for a seat on the South Cambridgeshire District Council in the 2022 local elections, contesting in the ward of Melbourn and coming in last place.

While he has stood as a candidate for the Labour Party, Sarris has been critical of the Labour government of Prime Minister Keir Starmer. In response to the expansion of free school meals to reduce child poverty, he posted on Twitter that parents should "Pay for your own kids. If you should choose to have them you should feed them. Especially with the massive ‘child benefit’ uplift. FFS." Sarris has also criticised both Starmer and King Charles III for claiming that "Diversity is our greatest strength" and called for U.S. President Donald Trump to "Please invade."

In April 2026, Sarris criticised Hannah Spencer of the Green Party for her comments on drinking culture in Parliament, referring to her as "Eco-Taliban" and stating that "Most Green smell of dope and are manifest soap dodgers, so if I were her I would de-skank and shut up." He also criticised the Green Party as a whole, posting that "Her party literally wants to legalise all drugs," followed by several emojis, including of monkeys, clowns, and the flag of Russia. A spokesperson for Trinity College said that “The views expressed, which were made in a personal capacity, do not in any way represent the views of Trinity College. Trinity recognises the right of college members to express their views, within the law, however disagreeable or controversial.”

== Books ==
- Justinian: Emperor, Soldier, Saint (Basic Books, 2023)
- Empires of Faith: The Fall of Rome to the Rise of Islam, 500-700 (Oxford University Press, 2011)
- Byzantium, A Very Short Introduction (Oxford University Press, 2015)
- Economy and Society in the Age of Justinian (Cambridge University Press, 2006)
