= 2022 South Cambridgeshire District Council election =

2022 UK local government election

- 5 May 2022

All 45 council seats 23 seats needed for a majority
	First party	Second party
Party	Liberal Democrats	Conservative
Last election	30	11
Seats won	37	8
Seat change	▲7	▼3
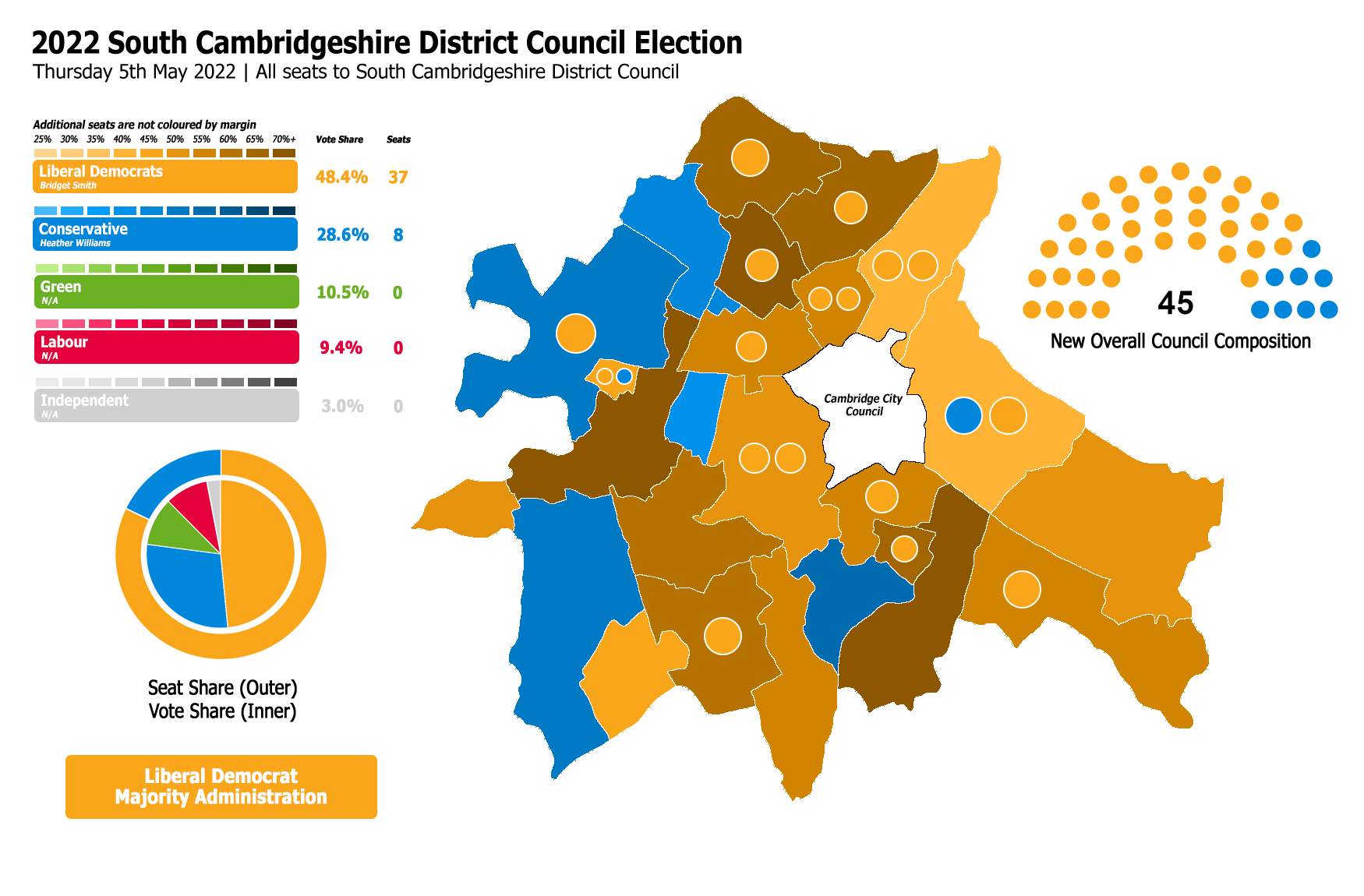
- Map of the results of the election by ward

Elections to South Cambridgeshire District Council were held on Thursday 5 May 2022 as part of the 2022 United Kingdom local elections. All forty five seats were up for election in twenty six wards. The Liberal Democrats were defending the council, having won control in 2018.

== Results summary ==
2022 South Cambridgeshire District Council election
Party	Candidates	Seats	Gains	Losses	Net gain/loss	Seats %	Votes %	Votes	+/−
Liberal Democrats	45	37	7	0	▲7	82.2	52.1	52,851	+13.6
Conservative	45	8	0	3	▼3	17.8	29.2	29,624	–4.9
Labour	22	0	0	2	▼2	0.0	10.8	10,939	–6.7
Green	16	0	0	0	Steady	0.0	6.2	6,246	+1.8
Independent	3	0	0	2	▼2	0.0	1.8	1,807	–3.7

=== Changes between May 2022 and May 2026 ===
As of February 2026, the composition of the Council is Lib Dem = 34. Con = 9, Ind = 1, Vacant = 1.

Five Lib Dem councillors have resigned. One to sit as an independent. Three led to by-elections from which two Lib Dems and one Conservative were returned. One seat is vacant.

One Conservative sat as an independent for a while before rejoining the party.

One Lib Dem councillor died, and the Lib Dems held the ward at the by-election.

== Ward results ==
A * denotes an incumbent

=== Balsham ===
Balsham (one seat)
Party	Candidate	Votes	%	±%
Liberal Democrats	Geoff Harvey*	704	54.2	+6.7
Conservative	John Biggs	404	31.1	−8.6
Labour	Jason Walter	101	7.8	−2.6
Green	Bob Ensch	90	6.9	+4.5
Majority				
Turnout		1,299	43.45	
Liberal Democrats hold		Swing		

=== Bar Hill ===
Bar Hill (one seat)
Party	Candidate	Votes	%	±%
Conservative	Bunty Waters*	560	48.2	−3.5
Liberal Democrats	David Barlow	506	43.6	+33.4
Green	Thomas Lachlan-Cope	95	8.2	−2.5
Majority				
Turnout		1,161	38.98	
Conservative hold		Swing		

=== Barrington ===
Barrington (one seat)
Party	Candidate	Votes	%	±%
Liberal Democrats	Aidan van de Weyer*	888	64.2	+15.7
Conservative	Chris Carter-Chapman	495	35.8	−6.5
Majority				
Turnout		1,383	52.15	
Liberal Democrats hold		Swing		

=== Bassingbourn ===
Bassingbourn (one seat)
Party	Candidate	Votes	%	±%
Liberal Democrats	Susan van de Ven	579	45.5	N/A
Conservative	Soma Pemmireddy	372	29.2	−5.9
Green	Simon Saggers	247	19.4	+6.6
Labour	Turlough Stone	75	5.9	−46.2
Majority				
Turnout		1,273	42.18	
Liberal Democrats gain from Labour		Swing		

=== Caldecote ===
Caldecote (one seat)
Party	Candidate	Votes	%	±%
Liberal Democrats	Tumi Hawkins*	909	74.3	+16.3
Conservative	Oliver Barnett	314	25.7	−12.1
Majority				
Turnout		1,223	43.37	
Liberal Democrats hold		Swing		

=== Cambourne ===
Cambourne (three seats)
Party	Candidate	Votes	%	±%
Liberal Democrats	Helene Leeming	1,382	46.9	+33.9
Liberal Democrats	Stephen Drew	1,295	44.0	+33.0
Conservative	Shrobona Bhattacharya*	1,022	34.7	−9.1
Liberal Democrats	Mark Hersom	991	33.6	N/A
Conservative	Conor Smith	821	27.9	−20.9
Conservative	Madhuparna Datta	809	27.5	−10.1
Labour	Kirsty Ellerker	626	21.2	−16.4
Independent	Aftab Ahmed	425	14.4	N/A
Green	Marcus Pitcaithly	397	13.5	−0.3
Independent	Sobia Zaman	276	9.4	N/A
Majority				
Turnout		2,946	38.12	
Liberal Democrats gain from Conservative		Swing		
Liberal Democrats gain from Labour		Swing		
Conservative hold		Swing		

=== Caxton & Papworth ===
Caxton & Papworth (two seats)
Party	Candidate	Votes	%	±%
Conservative	Mark Howell*	954	51.3	−10.8
Liberal Democrats	Peter Sandford	771	41.5	+23.1
Conservative	Tanya Gray	768	41.3	−15.3
Liberal Democrats	Sean Lindsay-Smith	574	30.9	N/A
Green	Gaynor Clements	405	21.8	+6.1
Majority				
Turnout		1,859	38.94	
Conservative hold		Swing		
Liberal Democrats gain from Conservative		Swing		

Councillor Mark Howell sat as an independent between April 2025 and March 2026.

=== Cottenham ===
Cottenham (two seats)
Party	Candidate	Votes	%	±%
Liberal Democrats	John Loveluck	1,545	69.0	+21.0
Liberal Democrats	Annika Osborne	1,354	60.5	+16.7
Conservative	Nigel Bolitho	498	22.3	−9.7
Conservative	Frank Morris	456	20.4	−9.5
Green	Colin Coe	409	18.3	+11.6
Majority				
Turnout		2,238	42.71	
Liberal Democrats hold		Swing		
Liberal Democrats hold		Swing		

Following the death of Councillor Loveluck, a by-election was held in March 2023 and the seat was held by the Lib Dems.

=== Duxford ===
Duxford (one seat)
Party	Candidate	Votes	%	±%
Liberal Democrats	Peter McDonald*	885	76.4	+26.8
Conservative	Luigi Murton	274	23.6	−18.0
Majority				
Turnout		1,159	41.45	
Liberal Democrats hold		Swing		

=== Fulbourn & Fen Ditton ===
Fulbourn & Fen Ditton (three seats)
Party	Candidate	Votes	%	±%
Liberal Democrats	John Williams*	1,433	40.3	−5.6
Conservative	Graham Cone*	1,305	36.7	+1.4
Liberal Democrats	Carla Hofman	1,166	32.8	−4.2
Liberal Democrats	Vince Farrar	1,132	31.9	+2.9
Labour	Tim Andrews	951	26.8	+4.2
Conservative	Neil Prem	856	24.1	−9.5
Conservative	Joanne Shiret	838	23.6	+0.3
Labour	Uroga Okello	837	23.6	+3.8
Labour	Luke Viner	751	21.1	+3.5
Green	Oliver Fisher	666	18.7	+9.2
Majority				
Turnout		3,553	44.74	
Liberal Democrats hold		Swing		
Conservative hold		Swing		
Liberal Democrats hold		Swing		

=== Foxton ===
Foxton (one seat)
Party	Candidate	Votes	%	±%
Liberal Democrats	James Hobro	876	56.0	+45.7
Conservative	Deborah Roberts*	689	44.0	−3.0
Majority				
Turnout		1,565	57.16	
Liberal Democrats gain from Independent		Swing		

Deborah Roberts had previously been elected as an independent.

=== Gamlingay ===
Gamlingay (one seat)
Party	Candidate	Votes	%	±%
Liberal Democrats	Bridget Smith*	795	53.6	+3.3
Conservative	Harriet Gould	689	46.4	+3.5
Majority				
Turnout		1,484	50.66	
Liberal Democrats hold		Swing		

=== Girton ===
Girton (two seats)
Party	Candidate	Votes	%	±%
Liberal Democrats	Corinne Garvey*	1,220	57.9	+41.1
Liberal Democrats	Richard Stobart	858	40.7	N/A
Conservative	Tom Bygott*	670	31.8	−7.5
Labour	Marcelo Goncalves de Lima	439	20.8	−1.9
Conservative	Gita Patel	436	20.7	+2.4
Green	Andrew Margetts	358	17.0	+3.5
Majority				
Turnout		2,108	51.01	
Liberal Democrats gain from Independent		Swing		
Liberal Democrats gain from Conservative		Swing		

The Liberal Democrats had gained the Independent seat in a by-election.

=== Hardwick ===
Hardwick (one seat)
Party	Candidate	Votes	%	±%
Conservative	Lina Nieto	471	44.2	−9.9
Liberal Democrats	Marcus Streets	345	32.4	+7.7
Labour	Joe Beastall	249	23.4	+7.0
Majority				
Turnout		1,065	41.05	
Conservative hold		Swing		

=== Harston & Comberton ===
Harston & Comberton (three seats)
Party	Candidate	Votes	%	±%
Liberal Democrats	Lisa Redrup	1,978	53.6	+5.8
Liberal Democrats	Michael Atkins	1,899	51.5	+5.3
Liberal Democrats	Ariel Cahn	1,564	42.4	−3.8
Conservative	Amanda Bacon	1,165	31.6	−5.4
Conservative	Lorraine Mooney	1,144	31.0	−5.9
Conservative	Joshua Vanneck	1,077	29.2	−1.0
Green	Steve Edmondson	892	24.2	+15.2
Labour	Michael Tierney	630	17.1	+5.5
Majority				
Turnout		3,690	45.86	
Liberal Democrats hold		Swing		
Liberal Democrats hold		Swing		
Liberal Democrats hold		Swing		

=== Histon & Impington ===
Histon & Impington (three seats)
Party	Candidate	Votes	%	±%
Liberal Democrats	Pippa Heylings*	2,133	58.6	+17.8
Liberal Democrats	Martin Cahn*	1,615	44.4	+11.5
Liberal Democrats	Sunita Hansraj	1,279	35.2	+3.9
Independent	Edd Stonham	1,106	30.4	+6.2
Labour	Geoff Moore	753	20.7	+2.6
Labour	Gareth Owen	626	17.2	−5.6
Conservative	Louise Daily	611	16.8	−2.0
Green	Sandra Archer	594	16.3	+9.8
Labour	Simon Patenall	498	13.7	−7.3
Conservative	Gail Arnold	478	13.1	−2.6
Conservative	Olawale Awoyinka	409	11.2	−2.5
Majority				
Turnout		3,637	42.46	
Liberal Democrats hold		Swing		
Liberal Democrats hold		Swing		
Liberal Democrats hold		Swing		

Following her election as MP, Pippa Heylings resigned her seat which was held by the Lib Dems at a by-election on 24 October 2024.

=== Linton ===
Linton (two seats)
Party	Candidate	Votes	%	±%
Liberal Democrats	Henry Batchelor*	1,389	57.4	+10.3
Liberal Democrats	John Batchelor*	1,388	57.4	+12.6
Conservative	John Bald	679	28.1	−12.0
Conservative	Merrie Mannassi	568	23.5	−9.4
Green	Jessica Eve	252	10.4	+1.9
Labour	Michael Murray	249	10.3	−1.7
Labour	Ernie Turkington	145	6.0	−3.0
Majority				
Turnout		2,420	42.41	
Liberal Democrats hold		Swing		
Liberal Democrats hold		Swing		

=== Longstanton ===
Longstanton (two seats)
Party	Candidate	Votes	%	±%
Liberal Democrats	Sarah Cheung Johnson*	1,326	71.6	+20.9
Liberal Democrats	Alex Malyon*	1,183	63.8	+20.9
Conservative	Harry Challands	425	22.9	−19.3
Conservative	Khadijeh Zargar	340	18.3	−15.3
Labour	Clare Wilson	252	13.6	+4.1
Majority				
Turnout		1,853	35.85	
Liberal Democrats hold		Swing		
Liberal Democrats hold		Swing		

Later in 2022, the two Lib Dem councillors resigned citing family pressures. A by-election was held on 3 November 22 and elected one Lib Dem and one Conservative.

=== Melbourn ===
Melbourn (two seats)
Party	Candidate	Votes	%	±%
Liberal Democrats	Jose Hales*	1,596	62.5	+8.8
Liberal Democrats	Sally Hart*	1,573	61.6	+9.3
Conservative	Jonathan Carter	654	25.6	−5.1
Conservative	Thomas Goldie	551	21.6	−7.5
Green	Paul Evans	292	11.4	+5.5
Labour	Peter Sarris	214	8.4	−3.1
Majority				
Turnout		2,554	39.92	
Liberal Democrats hold		Swing		
Liberal Democrats hold		Swing		

=== Milton & Waterbeach ===
Milton & Waterbeach (three seats)
Party	Candidate	Votes	%	±%
Liberal Democrats	Anna Bradnam*	1,485	44.7	+3.3
Liberal Democrats	Paul Bearpark*	1,412	42.5	+4.5
Liberal Democrats	Judith Rippeth*	1,255	37.8	+3.5
Labour	Elizabeth McWilliams	1,049	31.6	+9.4
Labour	Gareth Wright	945	28.5	+6.5
Labour	Anna Stevenson	788	23.7	+2.0
Conservative	Clive Rabbett	729	22.0	+2.4
Conservative	Christine Smith	663	20.0	+1.1
Green	Eleanor Crane	632	19.0	+11.6
Conservative	Alison Melton	594	17.9	−2.2
Majority				
Turnout		3,321	40.37	
Liberal Democrats hold		Swing		
Liberal Democrats hold		Swing		
Liberal Democrats hold		Swing		

In January 2026 Councillor Judith Rippeth resigned from the Council. As this was less than six months to go before scheduled elections, no by-election was called.

=== Over & Willingham ===
Over & Willingham (two seats)
Party	Candidate	Votes	%	±%
Liberal Democrats	Bill Handley*	1,482	66.9	+20.4
Liberal Democrats	Daniel Lentell	1,189	53.7	+12.5
Conservative	Leslie Edwards	576	26.0	−0.5
Conservative	James Hutchcraft	554	25.0	+2.1
Labour	David Parker	238	10.7	+1.2
Labour	Sephie Donnelly	199	9.0	+1.3
Majority				
Turnout		2,214	39.61	
Liberal Democrats hold		Swing		
Liberal Democrats hold		Swing		

A few months after the election, Councillor Daniel Lentell resigned from the Lib Dem group to sit as an independent. He cited his differences over the proposed Congestion Charge (a scheme that was subsequently abandoned).

=== Sawston ===
Sawston (two seats)
Party	Candidate	Votes	%	±%
Liberal Democrats	Brian Milnes*	1,403	68.2	+16.5
Liberal Democrats	Libby Earle	1,173	57.0	+15.5
Conservative	Paul Bryant	531	25.8	−8.6
Conservative	Donald Douglas	459	22.3	−9.5
Labour	Anand Pillai	324	15.8	+2.3
Majority				
Turnout		2,057	37.56	
Liberal Democrats hold		Swing		
Liberal Democrats hold		Swing		

=== Shelford ===
Shelford (two seats)
Party	Candidate	Votes	%	±%
Liberal Democrats	Peter Fane*	1,612	59.3	+11.0
Liberal Democrats	William Jackson-Wood	1,198	44.0	−0.8
Conservative	Benjamin Shelton	924	34.0	+1.2
Conservative	Andrew Appleyard	889	32.7	+2.4
Green	Gregory Price	605	22.2	+12.5
Majority				
Turnout		2,720	47.83	
Liberal Democrats hold		Swing		
Liberal Democrats hold		Swing		

=== Swavesey ===
Swavesey (one seat)
Party	Candidate	Votes	%	±%
Conservative	Susan Ellington*	494	46.5	−13.5
Liberal Democrats	Natalie Warren-Green	359	33.8	+23.8
Green	John Turner	209	19.7	+16.3
Majority				
Turnout		1,062	37.64	
Conservative hold		Swing		

=== The Mordens ===
The Mordens (one seat)
Party	Candidate	Votes	%	±%
Conservative	Heather Williams*	749	50.8	+4.0
Liberal Democrats	Sebastian Kindersley	622	42.2	−4.2
Green	Holly Derrett	103	7.0	N/A
Majority				
Turnout		1,474	55.04	
Conservative hold		Swing		

=== Whittlesford ===
Whittlesford (one seat)
Party	Candidate	Votes	%	±%
Conservative	Richard Williams*	707	57.1	−6.2
Liberal Democrats	Barry Carolan	531	42.9	+28.4
Majority				
Turnout		1,238	46.40	
Conservative hold		Swing		

== By-elections ==
=== Longstanton ===
Longstanton, 3 November 2022
Party	Candidate	Votes	%	±%
Liberal Democrats	Natalie Warren-Green	578	32.1	−39.5
Conservative	Tom Bygott	566	31.4	+8.5
Liberal Democrats	Lawrence Zeegen	534	29.7	−34.1
Independent	Debbie Poyser	422	23.4	N/A
Labour	Dan Greef	411	22.8	+9.2
Conservative	Khadijeh Zargar	394	21.9	+3.6
Labour	Anand Pillai	266	14.8	N/A
Green	Silke Scott-Mance	169	9.4	N/A
Green	Colin Coe	85	4.7	N/A
Majority				
Turnout		1,804	33.63	−2.22
Liberal Democrats hold		Swing		
Conservative gain from Liberal Democrats		Swing		

=== Cottenham ===
Cottenham, 16 March 2023
Party	Candidate	Votes	%	±%
Liberal Democrats	Eileen Wilson	864	41.7	−21.4
Conservative	Francis Morris	678	32.7	+12.4
Labour	Tom Hingston	373	18.0	N/A
Green	Oliver Fisher	107	5.2	−11.5
Independent	Jo Pilsworth	52	2.5	N/A
Majority		186		
Turnout		2,084	39.33	−6.9
Liberal Democrats hold		Swing		

=== Histon & Impington ===
Histon & Impington by-election: 24 October 2024
Party	Candidate	Votes	%	±%
Liberal Democrats	James Rixon	942	38.7	–2.3
Independent	Edd Stonham	617	25.3	+4.0
Green	Kathryn Fisher	420	17.3	+5.9
Conservative	Clive Pelbrough-Power	283	11.6	–0.2
Labour	William Mason	172	7.1	–7.4
Majority		325	13.4	N/A
Turnout		2,436	28.6	–13.9
Registered electors		8,520		
Liberal Democrats hold		Swing	▼3.5	
