= 2015 South Cambridgeshire District Council election =

2015 UK local government election

South Cambridgeshire District Council election, 2015

Results by ward of the 2015 local election in South Cambridgeshire

Overall composition of the council following the 2015 election

Elections to South Cambridgeshire District Council took place on Thursday 7 May 2015, as part of the 2015 United Kingdom local elections. The election was held at the same time as the United Kingdom general election. Nineteen seats, making up one third of South Cambridgeshire District Council, were up for election. Seats up for election in 2015 were last contested at the 2011 election.

== Summary ==
The list of candidates was published on 9 April 2015. The Conservative Party and the Labour Party stood candidates in all 19 wards up for election. The Green Party had 17 candidates, the Liberal Democrats had 14 candidates and the United Kingdom Independence Party had six candidates. There were two independent candidates.

== Results ==
South Cambridgeshire District Council election, 2015
Party	Seats				Popular vote	
Party	Won	Not up	Total	±	Votes	%
Conservative	16	22	38	+3	24,984	47.6
Liberal Democrats	2	9	11	−2	9,399	17.9
Independent	1	6	7	−1	1,117	2.1
Labour	0	1	1	0	9,546	18.2
Green	0	0	0	0	5,486	10.5
UKIP	0	0	0	0	1,959	3.7
Total	19	38	57	–	52,491	–
Turnout						71.4

== Results by ward ==
Balsham
Party	Candidate	Votes	%	±%
Conservative	Richard Michael Turner	1,403	50.0	
Liberal Democrats	John Dennis Batchelor	864	30.8	
Labour	Imogen Buxton	316	11.3	
Green	Ellie Crane	222	7.9	
Majority		539		
Turnout			76.8	
Conservative hold		Swing		

Bar Hill
Party	Candidate	Votes	%	±%
Conservative	Roger Hall	1,300	45.6	
UKIP	Helene Yvette Green	530	18.6	
Labour	Alexander Smith	443	15.5	
Liberal Democrats	Clare Delderfield	315	11.0	
Green	Claudia Roland	265	9.3	
Majority		770		
Turnout			72.5	
Conservative hold		Swing		

Barton
Party	Candidate	Votes	%	±%
Conservative	Francis William Miles Burkitt	978	64.8	
Green	Anna Gomori	298	19.8	
Labour	Janet Shepherd	233	15.4	
Majority				
Turnout			76.2	
Conservative hold		Swing		

Bourn
Party	Candidate	Votes	%	±%
Conservative	Des O'Brien	3,002	56.4	
Labour	Gavin John Lawson Clayton	1,559	29.3	
Green	Marcus Pitcaithly	766	14.4	
Majority				
Turnout			66.7	
Conservative hold		Swing		

Comberton
Party	Candidate	Votes	%	±%
Conservative	Tim Scott	826	60.2	
Labour	John Samuel Shepherd	199	14.5	
Liberal Democrats	Annette Tattersall	180	13.1	
Green	Andrew John Margetts	168	12.2	
Majority				
Turnout			75.6	
Conservative gain from Liberal Democrats		Swing		

Cottenham
Party	Candidate	Votes	%	±%
Conservative	Timothy John Wotherspoon	1,969	44.5	
Liberal Democrats	Richard William Gymer	755	17.1	
Labour	Mark John McCormack	713	16.1	
UKIP	Eric Heaver	526	11.9	
Green	Colin Cyril Coe	464	10.5	
Majority				
Turnout			72.3	
Conservative hold		Swing		

Duxford
Party	Candidate	Votes	%	±%
Conservative	Mick Martin	919	57.5	
Liberal Democrats	Peter Nicholas Young	275	17.2	
Labour	Jean Ellen Prince	235	14.7	
Green	Wendy Bohme	169	10.6	
Majority				
Turnout			73.9	
Conservative hold		Swing		

Fowlmere and Foxton
Party	Candidate	Votes	%	±%
Independent	Deborah Patricia Roberts	682	45.9	
Conservative	Mark Daniel McMillan	583	39.3	
Labour	David John Merritt	112	7.6	
Green	Paul Evans	106	7.2	
Majority				
Turnout			77.3	
Independent hold		Swing		

Fulbourn
Party	Candidate	Votes	%	±%
Conservative	Graham David Cone	846	32.0	
Liberal Democrats	Nancy Louise Williams	815	30.8	
Independent	Neil John Scarr	435	16.5	
Labour	Rosie Ndiuza Charrot	393	14.9	
Green	John Ranken	155	5.9	
Majority				
Turnout			68.9	
Conservative gain from Independent		Swing		

Hardwick
Party	Candidate	Votes	%	±%
Conservative	Grenville James Chamberlain	731	48.2	
Liberal Democrats	Nigel John Atkinson	397	26.2	
Labour	Norman Alexander Crowther	188	12.4	
UKIP	Joe Webster	104	6.9	
Green	Clare Jane Rankin	98	6.5	
Majority				
Turnout			74.3	
Conservative gain from Liberal Democrats		Swing		

Histon and Impington
Party	Candidate	Votes	%	±%
Conservative	Christopher John Cross	1,917	33.5	
Liberal Democrats	Yemi Macaulay	1,850	32.3	
Labour	Aga Cahn	1,264	22.1	
Green	Darren Paul Cotterell	695	12.1	
Majority				
Turnout			70.1	
Conservative gain from Liberal Democrats		Swing		

Milton
Party	Candidate	Votes	%	±%
Liberal Democrats	Hazel Marion Smith	1,243	52.7	
Conservative	Christine Linda Smith	601	25.5	
Labour	Alison Wood	345	14.6	
UKIP	John James Wilson	168	7.1	
Majority				
Turnout			72.4	
Liberal Democrats hold		Swing		

Orwell and Barrington
Party	Candidate	Votes	%	±%
Liberal Democrats	Aidan Thomas Van De Weyer	657	45.5	
Conservative	Ian Sharp	567	39.3	
Labour	Turlough Francis Stone	122	8.5	
Green	David Stephen Smith	97	6.7	
Majority				
Turnout			74.9	
Liberal Democrats gain from Conservative		Swing		

Papworth and Elsworth
Party	Candidate	Votes	%	±%
Conservative	Nick Wright	1,851	61.3	
Labour	Angela Mary Patrick	453	15.0	
Liberal Democrats	Mark Peter Hersom	392	12.9	
Green	Gaynor Clements	325	10.8	
Majority				
Turnout			71.2	
Conservative hold		Swing		

Sawston
Party	Candidate	Votes	%	±%
Conservative	David Roy Bard	2,135	59.7	
Labour	Mark Toner	888	24.8	
Green	Sophi Berridge	553	15.5	
Majority				
Turnout			65.7	
Conservative hold		Swing		

Teversham
Party	Candidate	Votes	%	±%
Conservative	Caroline Anne Hunt	540	43.9	
Labour	Elizabeth Gemmell Herbert	356	28.9	
Liberal Democrats	Barry John Platt	182	14.8	
Green	Oliver Edward Fisher	151	12.3	
Majority				
Turnout			62.5	
Conservative hold		Swing		

The Abingtons
Party	Candidate	Votes	%	±%
Conservative	Tony Orgee	959	70.4	
Labour	Barnaby Daniel Fiddes	270	19.8	
UKIP	Timothy Skottowe	134	9.8	
Majority				
Turnout			74.1	
Conservative hold		Swing		

The Shelfords and Stapleford
Party	Candidate	Votes	%	±%
Conservative	David Whiteman-Downes	2,076	47.2	
Labour	Mike Nettleton	882	20.0	
Liberal Democrats	Peter Fane	768	17.5	
Green	Linda Jane Whitebread	676	15.4	
Majority				
Turnout			75.7	
Conservative hold		Swing		

Willingham and Over
Party	Candidate	Votes	%	±%
Conservative	Brian Roy Burling	1,781	46.4	
Liberal Democrats	Tom Lee	706	18.4	
Labour	Ben Monks	575	14.9	
UKIP	Martin Hale	497	12.9	
Green	Helen Stocks	278	7.3	
Majority				
Turnout			70.7	
Conservative hold		Swing		
