= 2004 South Cambridgeshire District Council election =

2004 UK local government election

Results by ward of the 2004 local election in South Cambridgeshire. Striped wards have mixed representation.

Elections to South Cambridgeshire District Council took place on Thursday 10 June 2004, as part of the 2004 United Kingdom local elections and at the same time as the European Parliament election, 2004. Due to new ward boundaries, all 57 seats on the council were up for election, increasing the number of councillors by two. Seats up for election in 2004 were subsequently contested by thirds at the 2006, 2007 and 2008 elections.

== Summary ==
The Conservative Party remained the largest party while the Liberal Democrats made gains, but the council remained under no overall control. Labour lost two seats, halving their representation on the council.

== Results ==
South Cambridgeshire District Council election, 2004
Party	Seats				Popular vote	
Party	Won	Not up	Total	±	Votes	%
Conservative	23	0	23	0	33,165	42.2
Liberal Democrats	19	0	19	+3	26,948	34.3
Independent	13	0	13	+1	11,345	14.4
Labour	2	0	2	−2	4,049	5.1
Green	0	0	0	0	3,122	3.9
Total	57	0	57	–	78,629	–
Turnout						39.6

== Results by ward ==
=== B ===
Balsham Ward (2 seats)
Party	Candidate	Votes	%	±%
Conservative	Richard Edwin Barrett	1,034	27.8	N/A
Liberal Democrats	Samuel John Agnew	971	26.1	N/A
Conservative	Victoria Grace Ford	863	23.2	N/A
Liberal Democrats	Beate McCall	847	22.8	N/A
Turnout			52.3	
Conservative win (new seat)				
Liberal Democrats win (new seat)				

Bar Hill Ward (2 seats)
Party	Candidate	Votes	%	±%
Conservative	Roger Hall	738	25.4	N/A
Conservative	Bunty Elizabeth Waters	706	24.3	N/A
Liberal Democrats	Thomas Joseph Flanagan	697	24.0	N/A
Liberal Democrats	Nigel Campbell Pennick	392	13.5	N/A
Labour	John Samuel Shepherd	203	7.0	N/A
Green	Andrew J Margetts	165	5.7	N/A
Turnout			36.5	
Conservative win (new seat)				
Conservative win (new seat)				

Barton Ward
Party	Candidate	Votes	%	±%
Independent	Robin Page	482	45.8	N/A
Conservative	Jean Hughes	309	29.4	N/A
Liberal Democrats	Livia Medb Mitson	192	18.3	N/A
Green	William Michael Connolley	69	6.6	N/A
Turnout			56.9	
Independent win (new seat)				

Bassingbourn Ward (2 seats)
Party	Candidate	Votes	%	±%
Labour	Nigel Nielson Cathcart	831	32.7	N/A
Conservative	David Charles McCraith	614	24.1	N/A
Conservative	Helen Shelagh Rees	575	22.6	N/A
Green	Simon Peter Saggers	523	20.6	N/A
Turnout			35.5	
Labour win (new seat)				
Conservative win (new seat)				

Bourn Ward (3 seats)
Party	Candidate	Votes	%	±%
Conservative	Daphne Sybil Kathleen Spink	872	20.9	N/A
Conservative	Edward John Pateman	710	17.0	N/A
Conservative	David Hugh Morgan	697	16.7	N/A
Liberal Democrats	Michael Patrick Jocelyn	544	13.1	N/A
Liberal Democrats	David Michael McEwan-Cox	493	11.8	N/A
Liberal Democrats	Colin Kent McPhie	391	9.4	N/A
Labour	Mark David Hurn	287	6.9	N/A
Independent	Howard Clay Fall	176	4.2	N/A
Turnout			40.7	
Conservative win (new seat)				
Conservative win (new seat)				
Conservative win (new seat)				

=== C ===
Caldecote Ward
Party	Candidate	Votes	%	±%
Liberal Democrats	Robin Barry Martlew	398	56.1	N/A
Conservative	Denzil John Baldwin	312	43.9	N/A
Turnout			43.8	
Liberal Democrats win (new seat)				

Comberton Ward
Party	Candidate	Votes	%	±%
Liberal Democrats	Stephen Alexander Harangozo	389	45.7	N/A
Conservative	Joshua Charles Huntingfield	350	41.1	N/A
Labour	Edward Duncan Phillip Haygarth	112	13.2	N/A
Turnout			49.3	
Liberal Democrats win (new seat)				

Cottenham Ward (3 seats)
Party	Candidate	Votes	%	±%
Independent	Simon Mark Edwards	958	13.7	N/A
Conservative	Timothy John Wotherspoon	932	13.3	N/A
Independent	Jacqueline Dixon	879	12.5	N/A
Conservative	Nigel Charles Francis Bolitho	843	12.0	N/A
Independent	Michelle Louise Stewart	805	11.5	N/A
Conservative	Matthew Thomas Bradney	757	10.8	N/A
Liberal Democrats	Susan Mary Bainbridge	718	10.2	N/A
Liberal Democrats	David John Harrison	584	8.3	N/A
Liberal Democrats	David Alan Charlesworth	535	7.6	N/A
Turnout			39.2	
Independent win (new seat)				
Conservative win (new seat)				
Independent win (new seat)				

=== D ===
Duxford Ward
Party	Candidate	Votes	%	±%
Conservative	Robert Giles Russell Smith	505	51.1	N/A
Liberal Democrats	John Frederick Williams	483	48.9	N/A
Turnout			49.2	
Conservative win (new seat)				

=== F ===
Fowlmere and Foxton Ward
Party	Candidate	Votes	%	±%
Independent	Deborah Patricia Roberts	unopposed		
Independent win (new seat)				

Fulbourn Ward (2 seats)
Party	Candidate	Votes	%	±%
Independent	Neil John Scarr	652	23.9	N/A
Independent	Sandra June Olga Doggett	564	20.6	N/A
Liberal Democrats	John George Williams	453	16.6	N/A
Conservative	Mary Elizabeth Drage	331	12.1	N/A
Liberal Democrats	Max Arnold Parke Campbell	316	11.6	N/A
Conservative	Mark John Taylor	245	8.9	N/A
Green	Mary Anne Lawson	172	6.3	N/A
Turnout			37.9	
Independent win (new seat)				
Independent win (new seat)				

=== G ===
Gamlingay Ward (2 seats)
Party	Candidate	Votes	%	±%
Liberal Democrats	Sebastian Kindersley	1,152	38.2	N/A
Liberal Democrats	Ann Elsby	940	31.2	N/A
Conservative	Lister John Wilson	494	16.4	N/A
Conservative	John Edward Reynolds	430	14.3	N/A
Turnout			39.8	
Liberal Democrats win (new seat)				
Liberal Democrats win (new seat)				

Girton Ward (2 seats)
Party	Candidate	Votes	%	±%
Conservative	Eustace William Bullman	683	27.9	N/A
Conservative	Jane Margaret Healey	674	27.6	N/A
Liberal Democrats	Allen Peter Wheelwright	592	24.3	N/A
Green	Teal Richard Riley	491	20.1	N/A
Turnout			39.6	
Conservative win (new seat)				
Conservative win (new seat)				

=== H ===
Hardwick Ward
Party	Candidate	Votes	%	±%
Liberal Democrats	James Harvey Stewart	439	57.3	N/A
Conservative	Paul Andre Mantle	280	36.6	N/A
Green	Ajay Burlingham-Bohr	47	6.1	N/A
Turnout			40.2	
Liberal Democrats win (new seat)				

Harston and Hauxton Ward
Party	Candidate	Votes	%	±%
Liberal Democrats	John Arnfield Heap	420	45.9	N/A
Conservative	Alan William Langley	343	37.5	N/A
Green	Jacquelyn Jean Garfit	102	11.1	N/A
Labour	Thomas Harry Ruffles	51	5.6	N/A
Turnout			49.1	
Liberal Democrats win (new seat)				

Haslingfield and the Eversdens Ward
Party	Candidate	Votes	%	±%
Liberal Democrats	Elizabeth Mary Heazell	657	57.3	N/A
Conservative	Robert James Poulter	357	31.1	N/A
Green	Stephen Roy Edmonson	133	11.6	N/A
Turnout			55.8	
Liberal Democrats win (new seat)				

Histon and Impington Ward (3 seats)
Party	Candidate	Votes	%	±%
Independent	Michael John Mason	1,213	16.4	N/A
Liberal Democrats	Jonathan Peter Chatfield	1,155	15.6	N/A
Conservative	Jean Anne Muncey	861	11.7	N/A
Conservative	Neil Sinnett Davies	824	11.2	N/A
Liberal Democrats	Gillian Ruth Jones	772	10.5	N/A
Conservative	John William Hoppett	650	8.8	N/A
Liberal Democrats	James Roger Thomas	627	8.5	N/A
Labour	Philip Dean Gooden	603	8.2	N/A
Independent	Josephine Patricia Teague	354	4.8	N/A
Green	Mark Johan Alexander Claessen	329	4.5	N/A
Turnout			38.2	
Independent win (new seat)				
Liberal Democrats win (new seat)				
Conservative win (new seat)				

=== L ===
Linton Ward (2 seats)
Party	Candidate	Votes	%	±%
Liberal Democrats	John Dennis Batchelor	839	31.2	N/A
Liberal Democrats	Gladys Joan Smith	794	29.5	N/A
Conservative	Peter Norman Hase	441	16.4	N/A
Conservative	Colin Ernest Brown	441	16.4	N/A
Labour	Michael William Gale	175	6.5	N/A
Turnout			37.3	
Liberal Democrats win (new seat)				
Liberal Democrats win (new seat)				

Longstanton Ward
Party	Candidate	Votes	%	±%
Independent	Alexander Riley	471	67.3	N/A
Conservative	Peter Cecil Henry Hudson	146	20.9	N/A
Liberal Democrats	Sylvia Mary Abbott	83	11.9	N/A
Turnout			45.5	
Independent win (new seat)				

=== M ===
Melbourn Ward (2 seats)
Party	Candidate	Votes	%	±%
Liberal Democrats	Valerie Muriel Trueman	875	25.7	N/A
Liberal Democrats	David Louis Adrian George Wherrell	872	25.6	N/A
Conservative	Russell Davey	778	22.8	N/A
Conservative	Alan Craig Platts	615	18.1	N/A
Green	Sally Ann Seagrave Nichols	268	7.9	N/A
Turnout			40.4	
Liberal Democrats win (new seat)				
Liberal Democrats win (new seat)				

Meldreth Ward
Party	Candidate	Votes	%	±%
Liberal Democrats	Susan Elizabeth Kerr van de Ven	505	53.1	N/A
Conservative	David Leon Porter	386	40.6	N/A
Green	Pauline Radley	61	6.4	N/A
Turnout			51.3	
Liberal Democrats win (new seat)				

Milton Ward (2 seats)
Party	Candidate	Votes	%	±%
Liberal Democrats	Hazel Marion Smith	684	32.5	N/A
Independent	Richard Thomas Summerfield	678	32.3	N/A
Conservative	Gerda Ann Covell	318	15.1	N/A
Conservative	Christine Linda Smith	246	11.7	N/A
Labour	Alan Haylock	176	8.4	N/A
Turnout			32.8	
Liberal Democrats win (new seat)				
Independent win (new seat)				

=== O ===
Orwell and Barrington Ward
Party	Candidate	Votes	%	±%
Independent	Robert Francis Bryant	606	67.6	N/A
Conservative	Josephine Percy	290	32.4	N/A
Turnout			49.8	
Independent win (new seat)				

=== P ===
Papworth and Elsworth Ward (2 seats)
Party	Candidate	Votes	%	±%
Independent	Mark Phillip Howell	827	36.2	N/A
Conservative	Nicholas Ian Cecil Wright	531	23.2	N/A
Conservative	Mandy Lorraine Smith	513	22.4	N/A
Liberal Democrats	Jonathan Rolf Hansford	417	18.2	N/A
Turnout			34.8	
Independent win (new seat)				
Conservative win (new seat)				

=== S ===
Sawston Ward (3 seats)
Party	Candidate	Votes	%	±%
Independent	Sally Ann Hatton	913	22.4	N/A
Conservative	David Roy Bard	900	22.1	N/A
Labour	Sam Sana Ziaian-Gillan	613	15.1	N/A
Conservative	Raymond Michael Matthews	588	14.4	N/A
Liberal Democrats	Jeremy James Ridgway	530	13.0	N/A
Conservative	Jacqueline Gillian Anne Smith	530	13.0	N/A
Turnout			24.5	
Independent win (new seat)				
Conservative win (new seat)				
Labour win (new seat)				

Swavesey Ward
Party	Candidate	Votes	%	±%
Conservative	John Shepperson	444	56.4	N/A
Liberal Democrats	James Robert Falla	343	43.6	N/A
Turnout			40.7	
Conservative win (new seat)				

=== T ===
Teversham Ward
Party	Candidate	Votes	%	±%
Conservative	Caroline Anne Hunt	251	47.6	N/A
Labour	Daniel James Regan	224	42.5	N/A
Green	Martin Ian Lawson	52	9.9	N/A
Turnout			26.4	
Conservative win (new seat)				

The Abingtons Ward
Party	Candidate	Votes	%	±%
Liberal Democrats	John Patrick Richard Orme	605	63.6	N/A
Conservative	Robin Driver	216	22.7	N/A
Independent	Michael Stephen Patrick Gutteridge	131	13.8	N/A
Turnout			53.9	
Liberal Democrats win (new seat)				

The Mordens Ward
Party	Candidate	Votes	%	±%
Independent	Cicely Ann Elsa Demain Murfitt	785	78.0	N/A
Green	Samuel Morris	221	22.0	N/A
Turnout			55.4	
Independent win (new seat)				

The Shelfords and Stapleford Ward (3 seats)
Party	Candidate	Votes	%	±%
Conservative	Charles Reginald Nightingale	1,495	24.9	N/A
Liberal Democrats	Helen Freda Kember	1,334	22.2	N/A
Conservative	Henry Charles Hurrell	1,261	20.9	N/A
Conservative	John William Lamble	1,150	19.1	N/A
Labour	Amy Louise Moy	774	12.9	N/A
Turnout			35.8	
Conservative win (new seat)				
Liberal Democrats win (new seat)				
Conservative win (new seat)				

The Wilbrahams Ward
Party	Candidate	Votes	%	±%
Conservative	Robert John Turner	558	61.0	N/A
Liberal Democrats	Tomas Frederick Ralph Lynn	357	39.0	N/A
Turnout			45.0	
Conservative win (new seat)				

=== W ===
Waterbeach Ward (2 seats)
Party	Candidate	Votes	%	±%
Conservative	James Andrew Hockney	712	22.3	N/A
Liberal Democrats	Jane Rata Williamson	597	18.7	N/A
Conservative	Peter Terence Johnson	559	17.5	N/A
Liberal Democrats	Linden Mary Leeke	480	15.0	N/A
Independent	Catherine Rosemary Grant	459	14.4	N/A
Independent	Ray Gambell	392	12.3	N/A
Turnout			39.9	
Conservative win (new seat)				
Liberal Democrats win (new seat)				

Whittlesford Ward
Party	Candidate	Votes	%	±%
Liberal Democrats	James Alex Quinlan	592	64.0	N/A
Conservative	Anthony Richard Williams	333	36.0	N/A
Turnout			47.8	
Liberal Democrats win (new seat)				

Willingham and Over Ward (3 seats)
Party	Candidate	Votes	%	±%
Conservative	Ray Maurice Antony Manning	929	19.5	N/A
Conservative	Brian Roy Burling	841	17.6	N/A
Conservative	Philippa Saran Corney	804	16.9	N/A
Liberal Democrats	Rebecca Anne Mead	613	12.9	N/A
Liberal Democrats	Colin Thomas	591	12.4	N/A
Liberal Democrats	Leslie Harold Gelling	500	10.5	N/A
Green	Marion Eva Barber	489	10.3	N/A
Turnout			32.4	
Conservative win (new seat)				
Conservative win (new seat)				
Conservative win (new seat)				
