= 2014 South Cambridgeshire District Council election =

2014 UK local government election

South Cambridgeshire District Council election, 2014

Results by ward of the 2014 local election in South Cambridgeshire

Overall composition of the council following the 2014 election

Elections to South Cambridgeshire District Council took place on Thursday 22 May 2014, as part of the 2014 United Kingdom local elections. The election was held at the same time as elections to the European Parliament. Nineteen seats, making up one third of South Cambridgeshire District Council, were up for election. Seats up for election in 2014 were last contested at the 2010 election.

== Summary ==
The list of candidates was published on 24 April 2014. The Liberal Democrats and the Labour Party stood candidates in all 19 wards up for election this year. The Conservative Party stood in 17 wards. The United Kingdom Independence Party had seven candidates, while the Green Party stood five candidates. There were six independent candidates.

== Results ==
South Cambridgeshire District Council election, 2014
Party	Seats				Popular vote	
Party	Won	Not up	Total	±	Votes	%
Conservative	10	25	35	+1	11,285	32.9
Liberal Democrats	7	6	13	−3	9,997	29.1
Independent	2	6	8	+2	3,241	9.4
Labour	0	1	1	0	5,322	15.5
UKIP	0	0	0	0	2,843	8.3
Green	0	0	0	0	1,643	4.8
Total	19	38	57	–		–
Turnout						42.4

== Results by ward ==
Balsham
Party	Candidate	Votes	%	±%
Conservative	Andrew Fraser	994	57.1	
Liberal Democrats	John Batchelor	542	31.1	
Labour	Ben Nelmes	206	11.8	
Turnout				
Conservative gain from Liberal Democrats		Swing		

Bar Hill
Party	Candidate	Votes	%	±%
Conservative	Bunty Waters	728	45.5	
UKIP	Helene Davies-Green	394	24.6	
Labour	John Shepherd	263	16.4	
Liberal Democrats	Andy Pellew	214	13.4	
Turnout				
Conservative hold		Swing		

Bassingbourn
Party	Candidate	Votes	%	±%
Conservative	David McCraith	634	46.4	
Green	Simon Saggers	476	34.8	
Labour	Matt Rigaut	176	12.9	
Liberal Democrats	Annette Tattersall	81	5.9	
Turnout				
Conservative hold		Swing		

Bourn
Party	Candidate	Votes	%	±%
Conservative	David Morgan	677	25.3	
Independent	Des O'Brien	527	19.7	
Labour	Gavin Clayton	427	15.9	
UKIP	Lister Wilson	383	14.3	
Independent	Tim Hayes	327	12.2	
Green	Anita Clements	186	6.9	
Liberal Democrats	Mark Hersom	148	5.5	
Turnout				
Conservative hold		Swing		

Caldecote
Party	Candidate	Votes	%	±%
Liberal Democrats	Tumi Hawkins	551	60.9	
Conservative	Stephen Frost	256	28.3	
Labour	Helen Crowther	97	10.7	
Turnout				
Liberal Democrats hold		Swing		

Cottenham
Party	Candidate	Votes	%	±%
Conservative	Lynda Harford	1,118	43.6	
Liberal Democrats	Richard Gymer	556	21.7	
UKIP	Joe Webster	472	18.4	
Labour	Syed Mojumdar	420	16.4	
Turnout				
Conservative gain from Liberal Democrats		Swing		

Fulbourn
Party	Candidate	Votes	%	±%
Liberal Democrats	John Williams	1,192	77.9	
Labour	David Dobson	337	22.0	
Turnout				
Liberal Democrats hold		Swing		

Gamlingay
Party	Candidate	Votes	%	±%
Liberal Democrats	Bridget Smith	946	57.4	
Conservative	Adrian Dent	536	32.5	
Labour	Robin Philip Stern	166	10.0	
Turnout				
Liberal Democrats hold		Swing		

Girton
Party	Candidate	Votes	%	±%
Conservative	Tom Bygott	849	48.2	
Green	Teal Riley	352	19.9	
Labour	Mark McCormack	333	18.9	
Liberal Democrats	Pamela Manning	227	12.9	
Turnout				
Conservative hold		Swing		

Histon and Impington
Party	Candidate	Votes	%	±%
Independent	Edd Stonham	1,117	32.9	
Liberal Democrats	Yemi Macaulay	876	25.8	
Labour	Phil Gooden	780	22.9	
Conservative	Steven Mastin	621	18.3	
Turnout				
Independent gain from Liberal Democrats		Swing		

Linton
Party	Candidate	Votes	%	±%
Liberal Democrats	Henry Batchelor	624	35.1	
Conservative	Keiran Wakley	534	30.0	
Independent	Enid Bald	348	19.6	
Labour	Tom Purser	155	8.7	
Independent	Linda Howells	117	6.6	
Turnout				
Liberal Democrats hold		Swing		

Melbourn
Party	Candidate	Votes	%	±%
Liberal Democrats	Jose Hales	1,132	59.2	
Conservative	Joshua Vanneck	323	16.9	
UKIP	Clive Porter	318	16.6	
Labour	Angela Patrick	139	7.3	
Turnout				
Liberal Democrats hold		Swing		

Meldreth
Party	Candidate	Votes	%	±%
Liberal Democrats	Philippa Hart	583	63.9	
Conservative	Julian Leigh	214	23.4	
Labour	Turlough Stone	116	12.7	
Turnout				
Liberal Democrats hold		Swing		

Milton
Party	Candidate	Votes	%	±%
Liberal Democrats	Anna Bradnam	997	80.4	
Labour	Jason Koronowski	243	19.6	
Turnout				
Liberal Democrats hold		Swing		

Sawston
Party	Candidate	Votes	%	±%
Conservative	Raymond Matthews	761	40.9	
UKIP	Elizabeth Smith	442	23.8	
Labour	Mike Nettleton	423	22.8	
Liberal Democrats	Michael Kilpatrick	232	12.5	
Turnout				
Conservative hold		Swing		

Swavesey
Party	Candidate	Votes	%	±%
Conservative	Sue Ellington	449	68.4	
Labour	Janet Shepherd	130	19.8	
Liberal Democrats	Mark Holmes	77	11.7	
Turnout				
Conservative hold		Swing		

The Shelfords and Stapleford
Party	Candidate	Votes	%	±%
Conservative	Benjamin Shelton	1,143	42.3	
Green	Linda Whitebread	437	16.2	
Labour	Adrian French	396	14.6	
UKIP	Ian Couch	388	14.3	
Liberal Democrats	Peter Fane	341	12.6	
Turnout				
Conservative hold		Swing		

Waterbeach
Party	Candidate	Votes	%	±%
Independent	Peter Johnson	805	40.5	
Conservative	Sarah Smart	603	30.3	
Liberal Democrats	Myra Gaunt	399	20.1	
Labour	Clare Wilson	181	9.1	
Turnout				
Independent gain from Conservative		Swing		

Willingham and Over
Party	Candidate	Votes	%	±%
Conservative	Pippa Corney	845	40.3	
UKIP	Martin Hale	446	21.3	
Labour	Ben Monks	334	15.9	
Liberal Democrats	Tom Lee	279	13.3	
Green	Helen Stocks	192	9.2	
Turnout				
Conservative hold		Swing		
