= 2011 South Cambridgeshire District Council election =

2011 UK local government election

South Cambridgeshire District Council election, 2011

Results by ward of the 2011 local election in South Cambridgeshire

Overall composition of the council following the 2011 election

Elections to South Cambridgeshire District Council took place on Thursday 5 May 2011, as part of the 2011 United Kingdom local elections. Nineteen seats, making up one third of South Cambridgeshire District Council, were up for election. Seats up for election in 2011 were last contested at the 2007 election. The Conservative Party retained their majority on the council.

== Summary ==
At this election, Conservatives were defending 11 seats, Liberal Democrats were defending six and independents were defending two seats. Two seats changed hands at this election, as the Conservatives gained both Duxford and Teversham wards from the Liberal Democrats, increasing their majority on the council. Teversham was won by the Conservatives in 2007, but had been gained by the Liberal Democrats in a 2008 by-election.

In October 2011, independent councillor Alex Riley, Longstanton, joined the Conservatives, further increasing the number of Conservative councillors to 32.

== Results ==
South Cambridgeshire District Council election, 2011
Party	Seats				Popular vote	
Party	Won	Not up	Total	±	Votes	%
Conservative	13	18	31	+2	15,807	46.9
Liberal Democrats	4	14	18	−2	7,384	21.9
Labour	0	1	1	0	6,140	18.2
Independent	2	5	7	0	3,162	9.4
Green	0	0	0	0	661	1.9
UKIP	0	0	0	0	569	1.7
Total	19	38	57	–	33,723	–
Turnout						49.9

== Results by ward ==
Balsham Ward
Party	Candidate	Votes	%	±%
Conservative	Richard Edwin George Barrett	1,136	54.3	−5.6
Liberal Democrats	Kerry Wilfred Cook	590	28.2	−8.1
Labour	Alex John Jacob	277	13.3	+9.5
UKIP	Timothy Mark Skottowe	88	4.2	N/A
Majority		546		
Turnout			57.5	
Conservative hold		Swing		

Bar Hill Ward
Party	Candidate	Votes	%	±%
Conservative	Roger Hall	971	51.8	−8.6
Labour	John Samuel Shepherd	372	19.8	+8.1
Liberal Democrats	Peter Robert Fane	289	15.4	+0.2
UKIP	Helene Yvette Davies	244	13.0	+0.3
Majority		599		
Turnout			48.5	
Conservative hold		Swing		

Barton Ward
Party	Candidate	Votes	%	±%
Conservative	Francis William Miles Burkitt	774	73.5	+23.1
Labour	Roger Tomlinson	279	26.5	+20.4
Majority		495		
Turnout			55.2	
Conservative hold		Swing		

Bourn Ward
Party	Candidate	Votes	%	±%
Conservative	Alison Paula Elcox	1,106	42.2	−1.9
Independent	Roger Keith Hume	582	22.2	−19.7
Labour	Gavin John Clayton	503	19.2	+5.2
Liberal Democrats	Jon Hansford	433	16.5	N/A
Majority		524		
Turnout			41.3	
Conservative hold		Swing		

Comberton Ward
Party	Candidate	Votes	%	±%
Liberal Democrats	Stephen Harangozo	558	52.7	+4.5
Conservative	Tracy-Ann Neville	397	37.5	−6.7
Labour	Helen Mary Haugh	104	9.8	+2.2
Majority		37		
Turnout			51.9	
Liberal Democrats hold		Swing		

Cottenham Ward
Party	Candidate	Votes	%	±%
Conservative	Timothy John Wotherspoon	1,453	48.1	−8.9
Labour	Andrew Papworth	723	23.9	+14.0
Liberal Democrats	Alan John Leeks	523	17.3	−15.9
Green	Donald Allan McBride	185	6.1	N/A
UKIP	Michael Eric Heaver	139	4.6	N/A
Majority		730		
Turnout			49.1	
Conservative hold		Swing		

Duxford Ward
Party	Candidate	Votes	%	±%
Conservative	Mick Martin	574	47.6	+6.7
Liberal Democrats	Clare Delderfield	522	43.3	−11.6
Labour	Dinah Elizabeth Pounds	110	9.1	+4.9
Majority		52		
Turnout			57.7	
Conservative gain from Liberal Democrats		Swing		

Fowlmere and Foxton Ward
Party	Candidate	Votes	%	±%
Independent	Deborah Patricia Roberts	714	60.8	+15.6
Conservative	Mark William Wykeham Howard	320	27.2	+5.9
Green	Colin Reynolds	86	7.3	N/A
Labour	Angela Mary Patrick	55	4.7	+2.3
Majority		394		
Turnout			62.1	
Independent hold		Swing		

Fulbourn Ward
Party	Candidate	Votes	%	±%
Independent	Neil John Scarr	682	43.2	+3.6
Conservative	Richard Michael Turner	445	28.2	+1.9
Labour	Tom Ruffles	291	18.4	+13.7
Liberal Democrats	Ian Douglas Wallace	161	10.2	−19.2
Majority		237		
Turnout			45.8	
Independent hold		Swing		

Hardwick Ward
Party	Candidate	Votes	%	±%
Liberal Democrats	Jim Stewart	583	56.4	−17.2
Conservative	John Edward Reynolds	322	31.2	+9.1
Labour	Norman Crowther	128	12.4	+8.2
Majority		261		
Turnout			51.4	
Liberal Democrats hold		Swing		

Histon and Impington Ward
Party	Candidate	Votes	%	±%
Liberal Democrats	Jonathan Peter Chatfield	1,293	36.0	−16.2
Independent	Neil Sinnett Davies	1,184	33.0	N/A
Conservative	Steve Mastin	635	17.7	−22.5
Labour	Godson Lawal	378	10.5	+2.9
UKIP	Joe Webster	98	2.7	N/A
Majority		109		
Turnout			49.7	
Liberal Democrats hold		Swing		

Milton Ward
Party	Candidate	Votes	%	±%
Liberal Democrats	Hazel Marion Smith	807	54.3	+2.9
Conservative	Gerda Ann Covell	471	31.7	−10.4
Labour	Alexandra Mayer	209	14.1	+7.5
Majority		336		
Turnout			48.2	
Liberal Democrats hold		Swing		

Orwell and Barrington Ward
Party	Candidate	Votes	%	±%
Conservative	Ted Ridgeway Watt	534	56.9	−26.3
Liberal Democrats	Anabela Pinto	303	32.3	N/A
Labour	Susan Hailes	101	10.8	−5.9
Majority		231		
Turnout			51.3	
Conservative hold		Swing		

Papworth and Elsworth Ward
Party	Candidate	Votes	%	±%
Conservative	Nicholas Ian Cecil Wright	1,235	74.2	0.0
Labour	Peter Sarris	429	25.8	0.0
Majority		806		
Turnout			46.9	
Conservative hold		Swing		

Sawston Ward
Party	Candidate	Votes	%	±%
Conservative	David Roy Bard	1,397	64.6	−2.9
Labour	Martin Higgins	767	35.4	+20.3
Majority		630		
Turnout			54.9	
Conservative hold		Swing		

Teversham Ward
Party	Candidate	Votes	%	±%
Conservative	Caroline Anne Hunt	446	53.8	+19.8
Liberal Democrats	Frances Aisha Roberts Amrani	207	24.9	−13.6
Labour	David Cornell	176	21.2	N/A
Majority		239		
Turnout			43.7	
Conservative gain from Liberal Democrats		Swing		

The Abingtons Ward
Party	Candidate	Votes	%	±%
Conservative	Tony Orgee	782	81.9	+0.7
Labour	Gill Taylor	172	18.0	N/A
Majority		610		
Turnout			54.7	
Conservative hold		Swing		

The Shelfords and Stapleford Ward
Party	Candidate	Votes	%	±%
Conservative	David Charles Whiteman-Downes	1,503	49.1	−5.1
Liberal Democrats	Michael Thomas Kilpatrick	621	20.3	−18.4
Labour	Mike Nettleton	545	17.8	+10.8
Green	Linda Whitebread	390	12.8	N/A
Majority		882		
Turnout			54.5	
Conservative hold		Swing		

Willingham and Over Ward
Party	Candidate	Votes	%	±%
Conservative	Brian Roy Burling	1,306	56.3	+9.2
Labour	Ben Monks	521	22.5	+17.7
Liberal Democrats	Geoff Twiss	494	21.3	+0.3
Majority		785		
Turnout			44.5	
Conservative hold		Swing		
