= 2007 South Cambridgeshire District Council election =

2007 UK local government election

South Cambridgeshire District Council election, 2007

Results by ward of the 2007 local election in South Cambridgeshire

Overall composition of the council following the 2007 election

Elections to South Cambridgeshire District Council took place on Thursday 3 May 2007, as part of the 2007 United Kingdom local elections. Nineteen seats, making up one third of South Cambridgeshire District Council, were up for election. Seats up for election in 2007 were last contested at the 2004 election, when all seats were up for election due to new ward boundaries, and were next contested at the 2011 election. The Conservative Party gained an overall majority on the council for the first time.

== Summary ==
Of the seats being contested at this election, the Conservatives were defending 9 seats, Liberal Democrats were defending 6 seats, and independents were defending 4 seats. Two seats had changed hands at by-elections prior to this election. In November 2004, Liberal Democrats gained Duxford from the Conservatives, while in October 2006 Conservatives gained the Abingtons from the Liberal Democrats. Both by-election gains were successfully defended at this election.

A further three seats were gained by the Conservative Party at this election. Gains from independents in Barton and in Orwell and Barrington as well as from the Liberal Democrats in the Shelfords and Stapleford meant the Conservative Party formed a majority on the council for the first time.

== Results ==
South Cambridgeshire District Council election, 2007
Party	Seats				Popular vote	
Party	Won	Not up	Total	±	Votes	%
Conservative	12	17	29	+3	12,683	50.2
Liberal Democrats	5	12	17	−1	7,870	31.1
Independent	2	8	10	−2	2,439	9.6
Labour	0	1	1	0	2,025	8.0
UKIP	0	0	0	0	184	0.7
Green	0	0	0	0	76	0.3
Total	19	38	57	–	25,277	–
Turnout						40.1

== Results by ward ==
Balsham Ward
Party	Candidate	Votes	%	±%
Conservative	Richard Edwin Barrett	1,142	59.9	+8.9
Liberal Democrats	Pauline Elizabeth Jarvis	692	36.3	−12.6
Labour	Richard Amos	72	3.8	N/A
Majority		450		
Turnout			54.1	
Conservative hold		Swing		

Bar Hill Ward
Party	Candidate	Votes	%	±%
Conservative	Roger Hall	871	60.3	+10.5
Liberal Democrats	Sylvia Mary Abbott	220	15.2	−22.3
UKIP	Helene Yvette Davies	184	12.7	N/A
Labour	John Shepherd	169	11.7	+4.7
Majority		651		
Turnout			37.5	
Conservative hold		Swing		

Barton Ward
Party	Candidate	Votes	%	±%
Conservative	Francis William Miles Burkitt	446	50.4	+21.0
Independent	Keith Robert Scott	309	34.9	N/A
Green	Anna Gomori-Woodcock	76	8.6	+2.0
Labour	Annabel Jane Barrett	54	6.1	N/A
Majority		137		
Turnout			48.2	
Conservative gain from Independent		Swing		

Bourn Ward
Party	Candidate	Votes	%	±%
Conservative	Lorraine Ann Morgan	676	44.1	−10.6
Independent	Roger Keith Hume	642	41.9	N/A
Labour	Mark David Hurn	215	14.0	+7.1
Majority		52		
Turnout			31.6	
Conservative hold		Swing		

Comberton Ward
Party	Candidate	Votes	%	±%
Liberal Democrats	Stephen Alexander Harangozo	438	48.2	+2.5
Conservative	Hywel Wyn Griffiths	401	44.2	+3.0
Labour	Peter Durrant	69	7.6	−5.6
Majority		39		
Turnout			49.3	
Liberal Democrats hold		Swing		

Cottenham Ward
Party	Candidate	Votes	%	±%
Conservative	Timothy John Wotherspoon	1,163	56.9	+20.8
Liberal Democrats	Susan Mary Bainbridge	678	33.2	+6.9
Labour	Michael Wilson	202	9.9	N/A
Majority		485		
Turnout			34.0	
Conservative hold		Swing		

Duxford Ward
Party	Candidate	Votes	%	±%
Liberal Democrats	John Williams	525	54.9	+6.0
Conservative	Robin Driver	391	40.9	−10.2
Labour	Yvonne Nobis	40	4.2	N/A
Majority		134		
Turnout			47.2	
Liberal Democrats hold		Swing		

Fowlmere and Foxton Ward
Party	Candidate	Votes	%	±%
Independent	Deborah Patricia Roberts	489	45.2	N/A
Liberal Democrats	Christine Dallas Cartwright	338	31.2	N/A
Conservative	Robert James Poulter	230	21.2	N/A
Labour	Grace Everson	26	2.4	N/A
Majority		151		
Turnout			57.5	
Independent hold		Swing		

Fulbourn Ward
Party	Candidate	Votes	%	±%
Independent	Neil John Scarr	528	39.6	+15.8
Liberal Democrats	John George Williams	391	29.4	+1.2
Conservative	Alison Mary Farmer	350	26.3	+5.2
Labour	Owen Leonard	63	4.7	N/A
Majority		137		
Turnout			39.4	
Independent hold		Swing		

Hardwick Ward
Party	Candidate	Votes	%	±%
Liberal Democrats	Jim Stewart	504	73.7	+16.4
Conservative	Mandy Lorraine Smith	151	22.1	−14.5
Labour	Helen Haugh	29	4.2	N/A
Majority		353		
Turnout			35.5	
Liberal Democrats hold		Swing		

Histon and Impington Ward
Party	Candidate	Votes	%	±%
Liberal Democrats	Jonathan Peter Chatfield	1,309	52.2	+17.6
Conservative	Philip 'Scotty' Scott	1,008	40.2	+8.6
Labour	Robin Philip Stern	191	7.6	−0.5
Majority		301		
Turnout			40.7	
Liberal Democrats hold		Swing		

Milton Ward
Party	Candidate	Votes	%	±%
Liberal Democrats	Hazel Marion Smith	714	51.4	+18.9
Conservative	Gerda Covell	584	42.0	+15.2
Labour	Valerie Ross	91	6.6	−1.8
Majority		130		
Turnout			45.8	
Liberal Democrats hold		Swing		

Orwell and Barrington Ward
Party	Candidate	Votes	%	±%
Conservative	David Bird	532	83.3	+50.9
Labour	Sara Alison Ball	107	16.7	N/A
Majority		425		
Turnout			35.8	
Conservative gain from Independent		Swing		

Papworth and Elsworth Ward
Party	Candidate	Votes	%	±%
Conservative	Nick Wright	885	74.2	+28.6
Labour	Angela Patrick	308	25.8	N/A
Majority		577		
Turnout			36.6	
Conservative hold		Swing		

Sawston Ward
Party	Candidate	Votes	%	±%
Conservative	David Roy Bard	995	67.5	+17.9
Liberal Democrats	Ian Douglas Wallace	256	17.4	+4.4
Labour	Michael Olanrewaju Idowu	224	15.2	+0.1
Majority		739		
Turnout			27.9	
Conservative hold		Swing		

Teversham Ward
Party	Candidate	Votes	%	±%
Conservative	Caroline Anne Hunt	unopposed		
Conservative hold		Swing		

The Abingtons Ward
Party	Candidate	Votes	%	±%
Conservative	Anthony Geoffrey Orgee	680	81.2	+58.5
Liberal Democrats	David John Willingham	158	18.9	−44.7
Majority		522		
Turnout			48.5	
Conservative hold		Swing		

The Shelfords and Stapleford Ward
Party	Candidate	Votes	%	±%
Conservative	Jaime Ann Dipple	1,457	54.2	−10.7
Liberal Democrats	Helen Freda Kember	1,040	38.7	+16.5
Labour	Michael Nettleton	189	7.0	−5.8
Majority		417		
Turnout			49.1	
Conservative gain from Liberal Democrats		Swing		

Willingham and Over Ward
Party	Candidate	Votes	%	±%
Conservative	Brian Roy Burling	817	47.1	−6.9
Independent	Pat Daniels	471	27.1	N/A
Liberal Democrats	Leslie Harold Gelling	365	21.0	−14.7
Labour	Nicola Andrews	83	4.8	N/A
Majority		346		
Turnout			35.1	
Conservative hold		Swing		
