= 2016 South Cambridgeshire District Council election =

2016 UK local government election

South Cambridgeshire District Council election, 2016

Results by ward of the 2016 local election in South Cambridgeshire

Overall composition of the council following the 2016 election

Elections to South Cambridgeshire District Council took place on Thursday 5 May 2016 as part of the 2016 United Kingdom local elections. Nineteen seats, making up one third of South Cambridgeshire District Council, were up for election. Seats up for election in 2016 were last contested at the 2012 election.

== Summary ==
The list of candidates was published on 8 April 2016. The Conservative Party and the Labour Party stood candidates in all 19 wards up for election. The Liberal Democrats had 16 candidates, the Green Party had 12 candidates and the United Kingdom Independence Party had four candidates. There were four independent candidates.

This was the last election by thirds to South Cambridgeshire District Council before the council moved to all-out elections starting from 2018.

== Results ==
South Cambridgeshire District Council election, 2016
Party	Seats				Popular vote	
Party	Won	Not up	Total	±	Votes	%
Conservative	10	26	36	−1	11,753	38.1
Liberal Democrats	5	9	14	+3	6,902	22.4
Independent	3	3	6	−2	2,859	9.3
Labour	1	0	1	0	6,486	21.0
Green	0	0	0	0	1,953	6.3
UKIP	0	0	0	0	868	2.8
Total	19	38	57	–	30,821	–
Turnout						39.0

== Results by ward ==
Bassingbourn
Party	Candidate	Votes	%	±%
Labour	Nigel Cathcart	812	59.2	
Conservative	Joshua Huntingfield	286	20.6	
Green	Simon Saggers	274	19.9	
Majority		526		
Turnout			39.8	
Labour hold		Swing		

Bourn
Party	Candidate	Votes	%	±%
Conservative	Mervyn Loynes	868	39.1	
Labour	Gavin Clayton	594	26.8	
Liberal Democrats	Jeni Sawford	352	15.9	
UKIP	Helene Greene	236	10.6	
Green	Marcus Pitcaithly	169	7.6	
Majority		274		
Turnout			27.0	
Conservative hold		Swing		

Cottenham
Party	Candidate	Votes	%	±%
Conservative	Simon Edwards	956	40.7	
Labour	Joyce Matheson	504	21.5	
Liberal Democrats	Richard Gymer	350	14.9	
UKIP	John Wilson	290	12.4	
Green	Colin Coe	248	10.6	
Majority		452		
Turnout			38.1	
Conservative hold		Swing		

Gamlingay
Party	Candidate	Votes	%	±%
Liberal Democrats	Sebastian Kindersley	1,008	58.5	
Conservative	Alison Elcox	548	31.8	
Labour	John Goodall	166	9.6	
Majority		460		
Turnout			43.2	
Liberal Democrats hold		Swing		

Girton
Party	Candidate	Votes	%	±%
Independent	Douglas de Lacey	740	50.0	
Conservative	Alastair Simpson	304	20.6	
Labour	Mark McCormack	274	18.5	
Green	Teal Riley	161	10.9	
Majority		436		
Turnout			42.8	
Independent hold		Swing		

Harston and Hauxton
Party	Candidate	Votes	%	±%
Liberal Democrats	Janet Lockwood	489	53.1	
Conservative	Gina Youens	275	29.9	
Labour	Bruce Phillips	104	11.3	
Green	Paul Evans	53	5.8	
Majority		214		
Turnout			47.5	
Liberal Democrats hold		Swing		

Haslingfield and the Eversdens
Party	Candidate	Votes	%	±%
Liberal Democrats	Doug Cattermole	535	48.8	
Conservative	Lina Joseph	448	40.8	
Labour	Norman Crowther	114	10.4	
Majority		87		
Turnout			50.2	
Liberal Democrats gain from Independent		Swing		

Histon and Impington
Party	Candidate	Votes	%	±%
Independent	Neil Davies	1,278	39.9	
Liberal Democrats	Yemi Macaulay	698	21.8	
Labour	Njoki Mahiaini	533	16.6	
Conservative	Matthew Bradney	520	16.2	
Green	Darren Cotterell	174	5.4	
Majority		580		
Turnout			38.9	
Independent hold		Swing		

Linton
Party	Candidate	Votes	%	±%
Liberal Democrats	John Batchelor	753	43.6	
Conservative	Enid Bald	621	35.9	
Labour	Rosanna Evans	177	10.3	
Green	Paul Richardson	176	10.2	
Majority		132		
Turnout			46.7	
Liberal Democrats gain from Conservative		Swing		

Longstanton
Party	Candidate	Votes	%	±%
Conservative	Alex Riley	525	62.7	
Labour	Simon Down	146	17.4	
UKIP	Callum Hatch	82	9.8	
Green	Sandra Archer	54	6.4	
Liberal Democrats	Kirk Taylor	31	3.7	
Majority		379		
Turnout			33.9	
Conservative hold		Swing		

Melbourn
Party	Candidate	Votes	%	±%
Conservative	Val Barrett	936	61.2	
Liberal Democrats	Alexander Wasyliw	311	20.3	
Labour	Angela Patrick	282	18.4	
Majority		625		
Turnout			35.9	
Conservative hold		Swing		

Papworth and Elsworth
Party	Candidate	Votes	%	±%
Conservative	Mark Howell	927	64.4	
Labour	Darren Macey	334	23.2	
Liberal Democrats	Clare Delderfield	179	12.4	
Majority		593		
Turnout			33.6	
Conservative hold		Swing		

Sawston
Party	Candidate	Votes	%	±%
Conservative	Kevin Cuffley	849	42.9	
Labour	Robert Grayston	548	27.7	
Liberal Democrats	Brian Milnes	453	22.9	
Green	Helen Stocks	127	6.4	
Majority		301		
Turnout			34.4	
Conservative gain from Independent		Swing		

The Mordens
Party	Candidate	Votes	%	±%
Independent	Cicely Murfitt	556	55.2	
Conservative	Heather Williams	386	38.3	
Labour	Robin Stern	65	6.5	
Majority		170		
Turnout			51.5	
Independent hold		Swing		

The Shelfords and Stapleford
Party	Candidate	Votes	%	±%
Conservative	Charles Nightingale	1,021	41.6	
Labour	Mike Nettleton	705	28.7	
Liberal Democrats	Peter Fane	369	15.0	
Green	Sophi Berridge	360	14.7	
Majority		316		
Turnout			41.9	
Conservative hold		Swing		

The Wilbrahams
Party	Candidate	Votes	%	±%
Conservative	Robert Turner	452	54.1	
Liberal Democrats	Anthony Holland	216	25.9	
Labour	June Ford	167	20.0	
Majority		236		
Turnout			39.0	
Conservative hold		Swing		

Waterbeach
Party	Candidate	Votes	%	±%
Liberal Democrats	Ingrid Tregoing	649	34.9	
Conservative	Alan Shipp	466	25.0	
Labour	Gareth Wright	392	21.1	
Independent	Myra Gaunt	285	15.3	
Green	Mary Lachlan-Cope	69	3.7	
Majority		183		
Turnout			43.9	
Liberal Democrats gain from Conservative		Swing		

Whittlesford
Party	Candidate	Votes	%	±%
Conservative	Peter Topping	546	57.8	
Liberal Democrats	Peter McDonald	201	21.3	
Labour	Philippa MacGarry	197	20.9	
Majority		345		
Turnout			43.8	
Conservative hold		Swing		

Willingham and Over
Party	Candidate	Votes	%	±%
Conservative	Ray Manning	819	44.3	
Labour	Ben Monks	372	20.1	
Liberal Democrats	Sue Gymer	308	16.7	
UKIP	Martin Hale	260	14.1	
Green	Eleanor Crane	88	4.8	
Majority		447		
Turnout			34.3	
Conservative hold		Swing		
