= List of churches in South Cambridgeshire =

The following is a list of churches in South Cambridgeshire.

== Active churches ==
The district has an estimated 147 active churches for 156,500 inhabitants, a ratio of one church to every 1,065 people.

The only civil parish without a church is Papworth St Agnes.

Name	Image	Civil parish	Dedication	Web	Founded	Denomination	Benefice	Notes
St Michael & All Angels, Abington Pigotts		Abington Pigotts	Michael & Angels		Medieval	Church of England	Shingay Group	
St Nicholas, Arrington		Arrington	Nicholas		Medieval	Church of England	Orwell Group	
St Peter, Babraham		Babraham	Peter		Medieval	Church of England	Sawston with Babraham	
Holy Trinity, Balsham		Balsham	Trinity		Medieval	Church of England	Granta Vale Benefice	
Bar Hill Church		Bar Hill			1967	CoE/BU/Meth/URC		Permanent building 1971. New building 1991. Current minister URC.
All Saints, Barrington		Barrington	All Saints		Medieval	Church of England	Orwell Group	
St Mary, Bartlow		Bartlow	Mary		Medieval	Church of England	Linton Group	
St Peter, Barton		Barton	Peter		Medieval	Church of England	Lordsbridge Team	
Barton Baptist Church		Barton				Baptist Union		Referred to in parish documents
SS Peter & Paul, Bassingbourn		Bassingbourn cum Kneesworth	Peter & Paul		Medieval	Church of England	Bassingbourn with Whaddon	
Bassingbourn URC		Bassingbourn cum Kneesworth			1790	URC		
SS Helena & Mary, Bourn		Bourn	Helena & Mary		Medieval	Church of England	Papworth Team	
St Peter, Boxworth		Boxworth	Peter		Medieval	Church of England	Papworth Team	
St Michael & All Angels, Caldecote		Caldecote	Michael & Angels		Medieval	Church of England	Lordsbridge Team	
Cambourne Church		Cambourne			1999	CoE/BU/Meth/URC		
Christ Church Cambourne		Cambourne	Jesus		c. 2015	FIEC		Meets in Cambourne Village College
St Peter, Carlton		Carlton	Peter		Medieval	Church of England	Raddesley Group	Benefice includes five other churches in East Cambridgeshire.
All Saints, Castle Camps		Castle Camps	All Saints		Medieval	Church of England	Linton Group	
Castle Camps URC		Castle Camps				URC		
St Andrew, Caxton		Caxton	Andrew		Medieval	Church of England	Papworth Team	
Childerley Hall Chapel		Childerley				Church of England		Private chapel, used for occasional services by Caldecote church.
St Mary's, Comberton		Comberton	Mary		Medieval	Church of England	Lordsbridge Team	
Comberton Baptist Church		Comberton			c. 1850	Baptist Union		Current building constructed 1868-1869
St Mary, Conington		Conington	Mary		Medieval	Church of England	Papworth Team	
St Peter, Coton		Coton	Peter		Medieval	Church of England	Lordsbridge Team	
All Saints, Cottenham		Cottenham	All Saints		Medieval	Church of England	Cottenham with Rampton	
Cottenham Baptist Church		Cottenham			1781	Baptist Union		Current building constructed 1856
St James, Croxton		Croxton	James		Medieval	Church of England	Papworth Team	
All Saints, Croydon-cum-Clopton		Croydon	All Saints		Medieval	Church of England	Orwell Group	
SS Peter & Paul, Dry Drayton		Dry Drayton	Peter & Paul		Medieval	Church of England	Lordsbridge Team	
St Peter, Duxford		Duxford	Peter		Medieval	Church of England	Duxford, Hinxton & Ickleton	
Duxford URC		Duxford				URC		
Holy Trinity, Elsworth		Elsworth	Trinity		Medieval	Church of England	Papworth Team	
SS Pandionia & John the Baptist, Eltisley		Eltisley	Pandionia & John B		Medieval	Church of England	Papworth Team	
St Mary the Virgin, Fen Ditton		Fen Ditton	Mary		Medieval	Church of England	Fen Ditton, Horningsea, Teversham	
St Mary, Fen Drayton		Fen Drayton	Mary		Medieval	Church of England		Benefice arrangements unclear.
St Mary, Fowlmere		Fowlmere	Mary		Medieval	Church of England	Four Church Benefice	
Fowlmere URC		Fowlmere				URC		
St Laurence, Foxton		Foxton	Lawrence of Rome		Medieval	Church of England	Four Church Benefice	
Foxton Methodist Church		Foxton				Methodist Church	Cambridge Circuit	
St Vigor, Fulbourn		Fulbourn	Vigor		Medieval	Church of England	Fulbourn and the Wilbrahams	Benefice also includes a church in East Cambridgeshire
Fulbourn United Reformed Church		Fulbourn			1810	URC		
St Mary the Virgin, Gamlingay		Gamlingay	Mary		Medieval	Church of England	Gamlingay, Hatley and Everton	Benefice also includes a church in Bedfordshire
Gamlingay Baptist Church		Gamlingay			c. 1700	Baptist Union		
St Andrew, Girton		Girton	Andrew		Medieval	Church of England	Girton and Madingley	
Girton Baptist Church		Girton			1860	Baptist Union		
SS Andrew & Mary, Grantchester		Grantchester	Andrew & Mary		Medieval	Church of England	Grantchester and Newnham	Benefice also includes St Mark's, Newnham, Cambridge.
St Botolph, Graveley		Graveley	Botwulf of Thorney		Medieval	Church of England	Papworth Team	
St Mary the Virgin, Great Abington		Great Abington	Mary		Medieval	Church of England	Granta Vale Benefice	
St Swithun, Great Chishill		Great and Little Chishill	Swithun		Medieval	Church of England	Icknield Way Parish	Benefice also includes churches in Essex.
St Nicholas, Little Chishill		Great and Little Chishill	Nicholas		Medieval	Church of England	Icknield Way Parish	
Great Chishill URC		Great and Little Chishill			1694	URC		Rebuilt 1895
St Mary, Great Eversden		Great Eversden	Mary		Medieval	Church of England	Lordsbridge Team	Rebuilt c. 1470
St Mary the Virgin, Great Shelford		Great Shelford	Mary		Medieval	Church of England		
Great Shelford Free Church (Baptist)		Great Shelford			1825	Baptist Union		
St Nicholas, Great Wilbraham		Great Wilbraham	Nicholas		Medieval	Church of England	Fulbourn and the Wilbrahams	
St Mary the Virgin, Guilden Morden		Guilden Morden	Mary		Medieval	Church of England	Shingay Group	
Guiden Morden Cong. Church		Guilden Morden			c. 1700	Cong. Federation		Current building 1840
St Mary, Hardwick		Hardwick	Mary		Medieval	Church of England	Lordsbridge Team	
Hardwick Evangelical Church		Hardwick			1980s	Baptist Union		Meets in local primary school. Joined Baptist Union 2016.
Assumption of Mary, Harlton		Harlton	Assumption of Mary		Medieval	Church of England	Lordsbridge Team	
All Saints, Harston		Harston	All Saints		Medieval	Church of England	Harston, Hauxton and Newton	
Harston Baptist Church		Harston			1786	Baptist Union		
All Saints, Haslingfield		Haslingfield	All Saints		Medieval	Church of England	Lordsbridge Team	
Haslingfield Methodist Church		Haslingfield			1867	Methodist Church	Cambridge Circuit	Current building 1977
Hatley St George church		Hatley		Medieval		Church of England		
St Edmund, Hauxton		Hauxton	Edmund the Martyr		Medieval	Church of England	Harston, Hauxton and Newton	
Holy Trinity, Heydon		Heydon	Trinity		Medieval	Church of England	Icknield Way Parish	Largely rebuilt 1950s after WW2 bomb damage
Holy Trinity, Hildersham		Hildersham	Trinity		Medieval	Church of England	Granta Vale Benefice	
St Mary and St John Church, Hinxton		Hinxton	Mary & John the Ev		Medieval	Church of England	Duxford, Hinxton & Ickleton	
St Andrew, Histon		Histon	Andrew		Medieval	Church of England	Histon and Impington	
Histon Baptist Church		Histon			1858	Baptist Union		
Histon Methodist Church		Histon				Methodist Church	Cambridge Circuit	
New Life Church Cambridge		Histon			2004	Global Horizons		Meets in Histon Baptist Church
St Peter, Horningsea		Horningsea	Peter		Medieval	Church of England	Fen Ditton, Horningsea, Teversham	
All Saints, Horseheath		Horseheath	All Saints		Medieval	Church of England	Linton Group	
St Mary Magdalene Church, Ickleton		Ickleton	Mary Magdalene		Medieval	Church of England	Duxford, Hinxton & Ickleton	
St Andrew, Impington		Impington	Andrew		Medieval	Church of England	Histon and Impington	
All Saints & St Andrew, Kingston		Kingston	All Saints & Andrew		Medieval	Church of England	Papworth Team	
All Saints, Knapwell		Knapwell	All Saints		Medieval	Church of England	Papworth Team	
All Saints, Landbeach		Landbeach	All Saints		Medieval	Church of England	Waterbeach & Landbeach	
Landbeach and Milton Baptist Church (Lamb church)	Landbeach and Milton Baptist church building ( lambchurch.uk )	Landbeach		www.lambchurch.uk	1816 (previous chapel) 1854 (current building)	Baptist Union of Great Britain		
St Mary, Linton		Linton	Mary		Medieval	Church of England	Linton Group	
Linton Free Church		Linton			c. 1700	URC		Current building 1818
St Catherine, Litlington		Litlington	Catherine of Alexandria		Medieval	Church of England	Shingay Group	
Litlington Congregational Church		Litlington				Cong. Federation		
St Mary, Little Abington		Little Abington	Mary		Medieval	Church of England	Granta Vale Benefice	
Little Abington URC		Little Abington				URC		
St Helen's, Little Eversden		Little Eversden	Helena (empress)		Medieval	Church of England	Lordsbridge Team	
SS Peter & Paul, Little Gransden		Little Gransden	Peter & Paul		Medieval	Church of England	Gransdens, Abbotsley & Waresley	Benefice also includes three churches in Huntingdonshire.
All Saints, Little Shelford		Little Shelford	All Saints		Medieval	Church of England	Little Shelford	
St John the Evangelist, Little Wilbraham		Little Wilbraham	John the Evangelist		Medieval	Church of England	Fulbourn and the Wilbrahams	
All Saints, Lolworth		Lolworth	All Saints		Medieval	Church of England		
All Saints, Longstanton		Longstanton	All Saints		Medieval	Church of England		
St Mary the Virgin, Longstowe		Longstowe	Mary		Medieval	Church of England	Papworth Team	
St Mary Magdalene, Madingley		Madingley	Mary Magdalene		Medieval	Church of England	Girton and Madingley	
All Saints, Melbourn		Melbourn	All Saints		Medieval	Church of England	Melbourn & Meldreth	
Melbourn Baptist Church		Melbourn			1675	Baptist Union		Current building 1856
Melbourn URC		Melbourn				URC		Current building 1717
Holy Trinity, Meldreth		Meldreth	Trinity		Medieval	Church of England	Melbourn & Meldreth	
All Saints, Milton		Milton	All Saints		Medieval	Church of England	Milton	
Cambridge New Apostolic Church		Milton				New Apostolic Church		
St Margaret of Antioch, Newton		Newton	Margaret the Virgin		Medieval	Church of England	Harston, Hauxton and Newton	
St Andrew, Oakington		Oakington and Westwick	Andrew		Medieval	Church of England	Oakington	
Oakington Baptist Chapel		Oakington and Westwick				Baptist Union		
St John, Orchard Park		Orchard Park	John the Evangelist		c. 2012	Church of England		Plant from Christ Church Cambridge. Meets in a local primary school
St Andrew, Orwell		Orwell	Andrew		Medieval	Church of England	Orwell Group	
Orwell Methodist Church		Orwell				Methodist Church	Cambridge Circuit	
St Mary the Virgin, Over		Over	Mary		Medieval	Church of England		
Over Methodist Church		Over			c. 1830	Methodist Church	St Neots & Huntingdon Circuit	Current building constructed 1848
Over Baptist Church		Over			c. 1742	Baptist Union		
St John the Baptist, Pampisford		Pampisford	John the Baptist		Medieval	Church of England	Whittlesford and Pampisford	
St Peter, Papworth Everard		Papworth Everard	Peter		Medieval	Church of England	Papworth Team	Papworth Team also includes two churches in Huntingdonshire
Papworth Catholic Meeting		Papworth Everard				Catholic Church	Huntingdon Parish	Served from Huntingdon. Meets in old St Luke's Methodist Church
St Thomas Indian Orthodox Church		Papworth Everard			2005	Malankara Orthodox		
All Saints, Rampton		Rampton	All Saints		Medieval	Church of England	Cottenham with Rampton	
St Mary the Virgin, Sawston		Sawston	Mary		Medieval	Church of England	Sawston with Babraham	
Our Lady of Lourdes, Sawston		Sawston	Mary		1958	Catholic Church	Our Lady & English Martyrs Parish	
Christ Church South Cambs		Sawston	Jesus		2006	Anglican Mission in England		2006 plant from All Saints, Little Shelford. Meets in Sawston Village College
Sawston Free Church		Sawston				Methodist/URC	Cambridge Circuit	
All Saints, Shepreth		Shepreth	All Saints		Medieval	Church of England	Four Church Benefice	
All Saints, Wendy		Shingay cum Wendy	All Saints		Medieval	Church of England	Shingay Group	Rebuilt 1867, current building 1980s was former school
St Mary, Shudy Camps		Shudy Camps	Mary		Medieval	Church of England	Linton Group	
St Andrew, Stapleford		Stapleford	Andrew		Medieval	Church of England		
SS Peter & Paul, Steeple Morden		Steeple Morden	Peter & Paul		Medieval	Church of England	Shingay Group	
St Mary, Stow cum Quy		Stow cum Quy	Mary		Medieval	Church of England	Anglesey Group	Benefice also includes four churches in East Cambridgeshire.
St Andrew, Swavesey		Swavesey	Andrew		Medieval	Church of England		
Bethel Baptist Church, Swavesey		Swavesey	Bethel		1840	Baptist Union		Current building constructed 1868
Swavesey Strict Baptist Chapel		Swavesey				Gospel Standard Baptist		
St Giles, Tadlow		Tadlow	Giles		Medieval	Church of England	Shingay Group	
All Saints, Teversham		Teversham	All Saints		Medieval	Church of England	Fen Ditton, Horningsea, Teversham	
Hope Community Church, Teversham		Teversham			2007	FIEC		Meets in local primary school. Plant from Rock Baptist, Cambridge
St George, Thriplow		Thriplow	George		Medieval	Church of England	Four Church Benefice	
St Andrew, Toft		Toft	Andrew		Medieval	Church of England	Lordsbridge Team	Partners with Toft Methodist under covenant "The Church in Toft".
Toft Methodist Chapel		Toft				Methodist	Cambridge Circuit	Partners with St Andrew's under covenant "The Church in Toft".
St John the Evangelist, Waterbeach		Waterbeach	John the Evangelist		Medieval	Church of England	Waterbeach & Landbeach	
Waterbeach Baptist Church		Waterbeach				Baptist Union		Known as Spurgeon's Chapel
Waterbeach Salvation Army		Waterbeach				Salvation Army		
St Mary, West Wickham		West Wickham	Mary		Medieval	Church of England	Granta Vale Benefice	
St Andrew, West Wratting		West Wratting	Andrew		Medieval	Church of England	Granta Vale Benefice	
St Mary, Weston Colville		Weston Colville	Mary		Medieval	Church of England	Granta Vale Benefice	
St Mary, Whaddon		Whaddon	Mary		Medieval	Church of England	Bassingbourn with Whaddon	
SS Mary & Andrew, Whittlesford		Whittlesford	Mary & Andrew		Medieval	Church of England	Whittlesford and Pampisford	
Whittlesford United Reformed Church		Whittlesford				URC		In an LEP with the Anglican church
St Mary & All Saints, Willingham		Willingham	Mary & All Saints		Medieval	Church of England		
Willingham Baptist Church		Willingham				Baptist Union		
Willingham Salvation Army		Willingham				Salvation Army		
St Andrew, Wimpole		Wimpole	Andrew		Medieval	Church of England	Orwell Group	

== Defunct churches ==
Name	Image	Civil parish	Web	Founded	Redundant	Denomination	Notes
St Mary, Childerley		Childerley		Medieval	C16th	Church of England	Village depopulated C16th to make way for deer park
Dry Drayton Methodist Church		Dry Drayton			2016	Methodist	Most recent building 1866
St John's Church, Duxford		Duxford		Medieval	1874	Church of England	Parish merged with St Peter's. In the care of the Churches Conservation Trust.
Eltisley Methodist Chapel		Eltisley			2010	Methodist	
All Saints, Fulbourn		Fulbourn		Medieval	1766	Church of England	
St Denis, East Hatley		Hatley		Medieval	1974	Church of England	Friends of Friendless Churches 2016
St Michael's Church, Longstanton		Longstanton		Medieval	1973	Church of England	Under the care of the Churches Conservation Trust.
St Luke's Methodist Church		Papworth Everard				Methodist	
St John the Baptist's Church, Papworth St Agnes		Papworth St Agnes		Medieval	1976	Church of England	Used for occasional services. In the care of the Friends of Friendless Churches.
Weston Colville Methodist Church		Weston Colville			2010s	Methodist	

== Map of medieval parish churches ==
=== Cambridgeshire ===
Medieval parish churches in Cambridgeshire

=== Central Cambridge ===
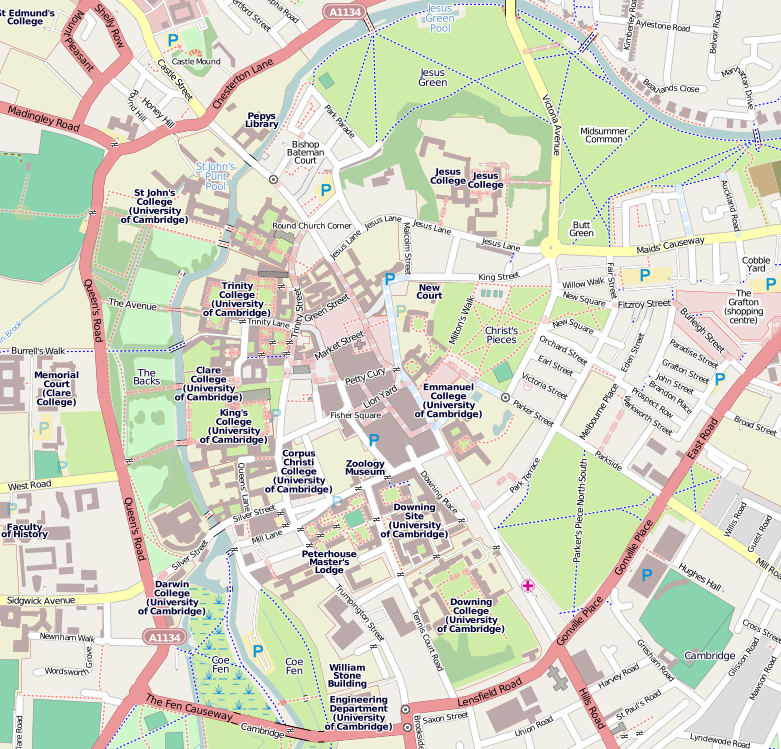
Medieval parish churches in Cambridge Central

== See also ==
- List of churches in Cambridgeshire
