= Chesterton Rural District =

Former district in Cambridgeshire

Coordinates: 52.218°N 0.149°E

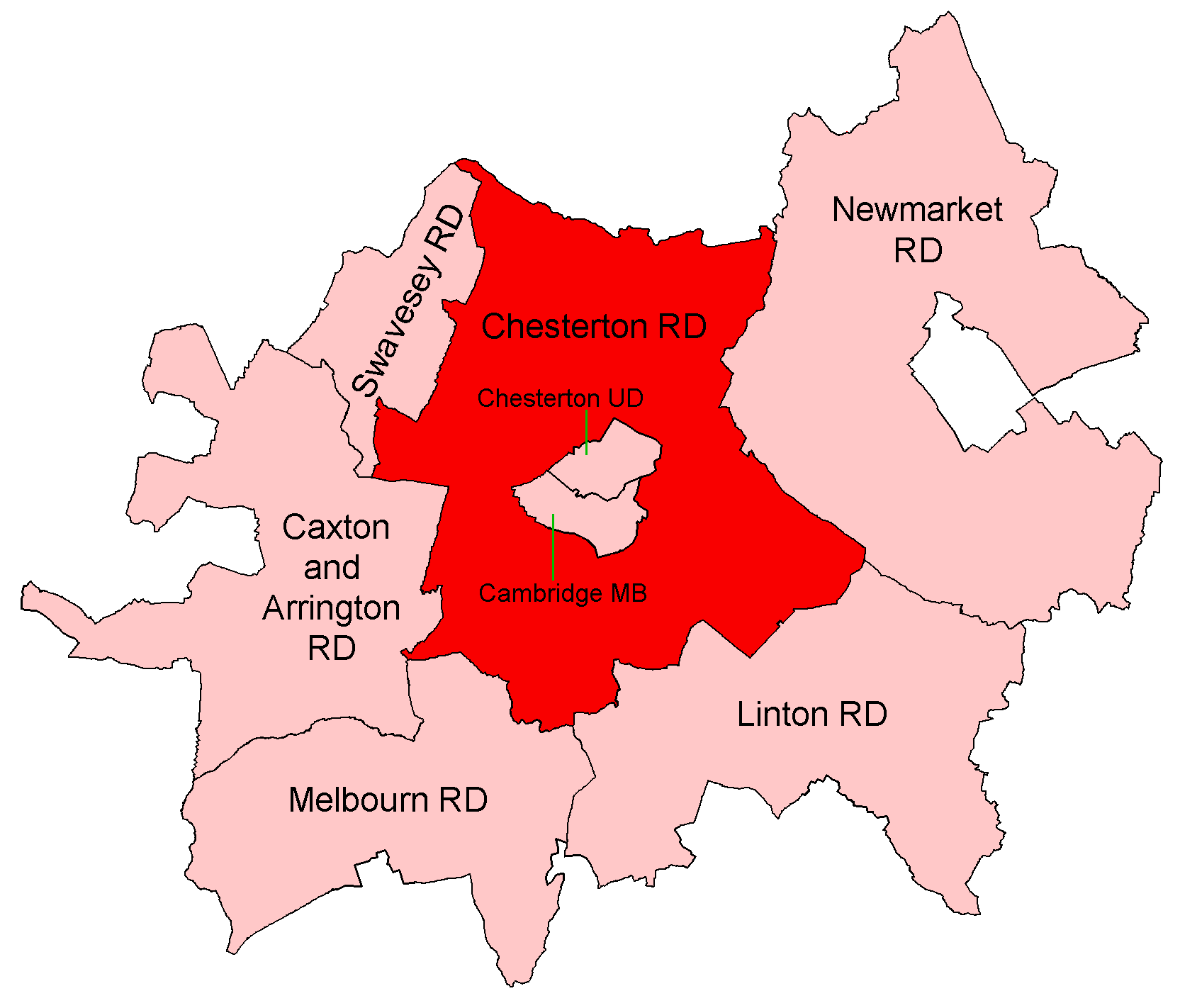
Boundaries in 1894

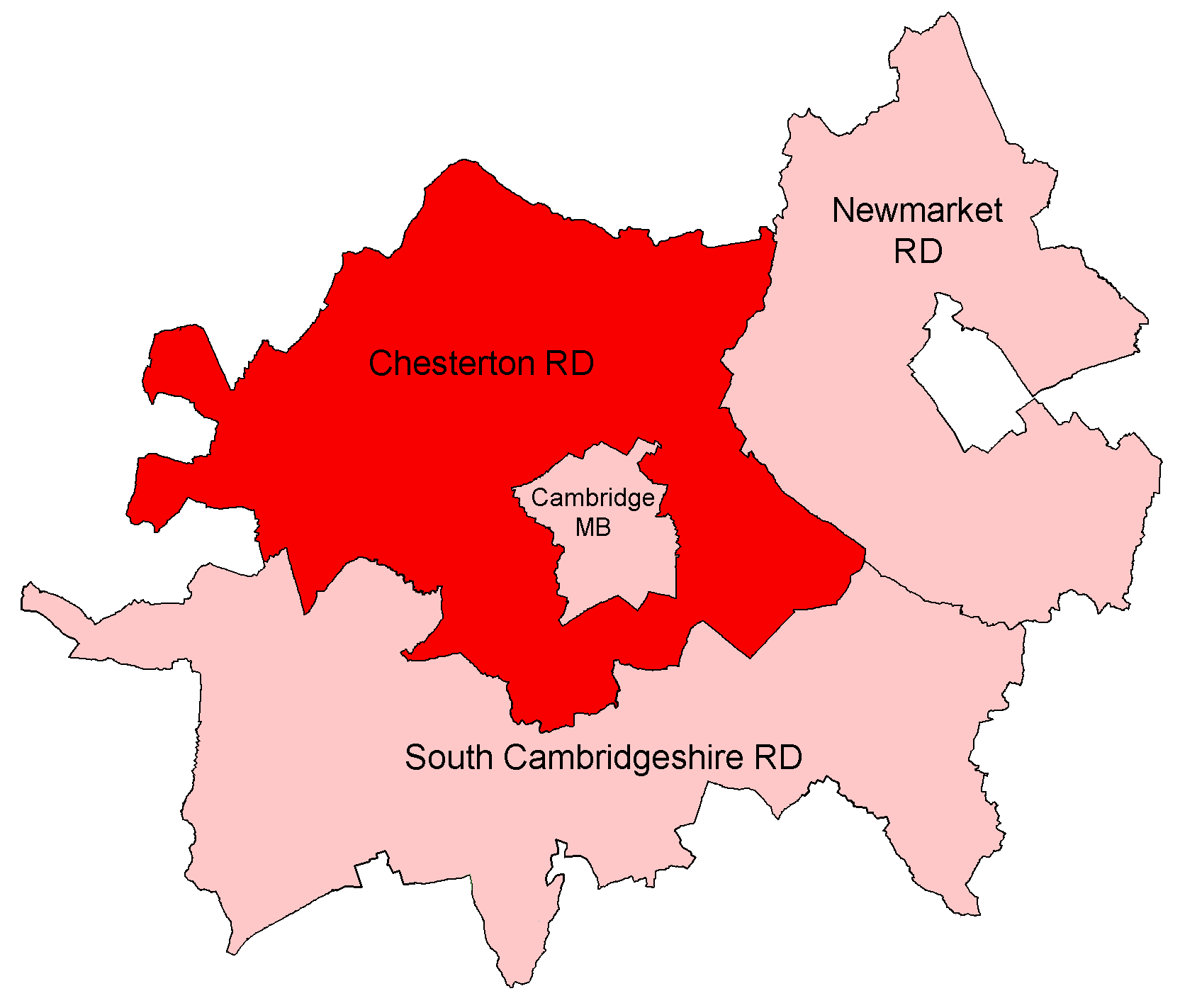
Boundaries in 1934

Chesterton was a rural district in Cambridgeshire, England from 1894 to 1974.

It was formed in 1894 as a successor to the Chesterton rural sanitary district. In 1934, under a County Review Order, its boundaries were altered, taking in the disbanded Swavesey Rural District and part of the disbanded Caxton and Arrington Rural District. It also ceded an area to the borough of Cambridge.

In 1965 it became part of the new administrative county of Cambridgeshire and the Isle of Ely.

The district was abolished in 1974 under the Local Government Act 1972, and merged with the South Cambridgeshire Rural District to form a new South Cambridgeshire district.

== Parishes ==
Parish	From	To	Notes
Bar Hill			
Barton			
Bourn	1934		Previously Caxton and Arrington RD
Boxworth	1934		Previously Swavesey RD
Caldecote	1934		Previously Caxton and Arrington RD
Caxton	1934		Previously Caxton and Arrington RD
Cherry Hinton		1934	Taken into Cambridge MB
Childerley			
Comberton			
Conington	1934		Previously Swavesey RD
Coton			
Cottenham			
Croxton	1934		Previously Caxton and Arrington RD
Dry Drayton			
Elsworth	1934		Previously Caxton and Arrington RD
Eltisley	1934		Previously Caxton and Arrington RD
Fen Ditton			
Fen Drayton	1934		Previously Swavesey RD
Fulbourn			
Girton			
Grantchester			
Graveley	1934		Previously Caxton and Arrington RD
Great Shelford			
Great Wilbraham			
Hardwick	1934		Previously Caxton and Arrington RD
Harlton			
Harston			
Haslingfield			
Hauxton			
Histon			
Horningsea			
Impington			
Knapwell	1934		Previously Caxton and Arrington RD
Landbeach			
Little Shelford			
Little Wilbraham			
Lolworth	1934		Previously Swavesey RD
Longstanton	1953		Merger of the following 2 parishes:
Longstanton All Saints		1953	
Longstanton St Michael		1953	
Madingley			
Milton			
Newton			
Oakington			
Over	1934		Previously Swavesey RD
Papworth Everard	1934		Previously Caxton and Arrington RD
Papworth St Agnes	1934		Previously Caxton and Arrington RD
Rampton			
Stapleford			
Stow cum Quy			
Swavesey	1934		Previously Swavesey RD
Teversham			
Toft	1934		Previously Caxton and Arrington RD
Trumpington		1934	Mostly taken into Cambridge MB
Waterbeach			
Westwick			
Willingham			
