= Caxton and Arrington Rural District =

Rural district in Cambridgeshire, England

Coordinates: 52.1°N 0.28°E

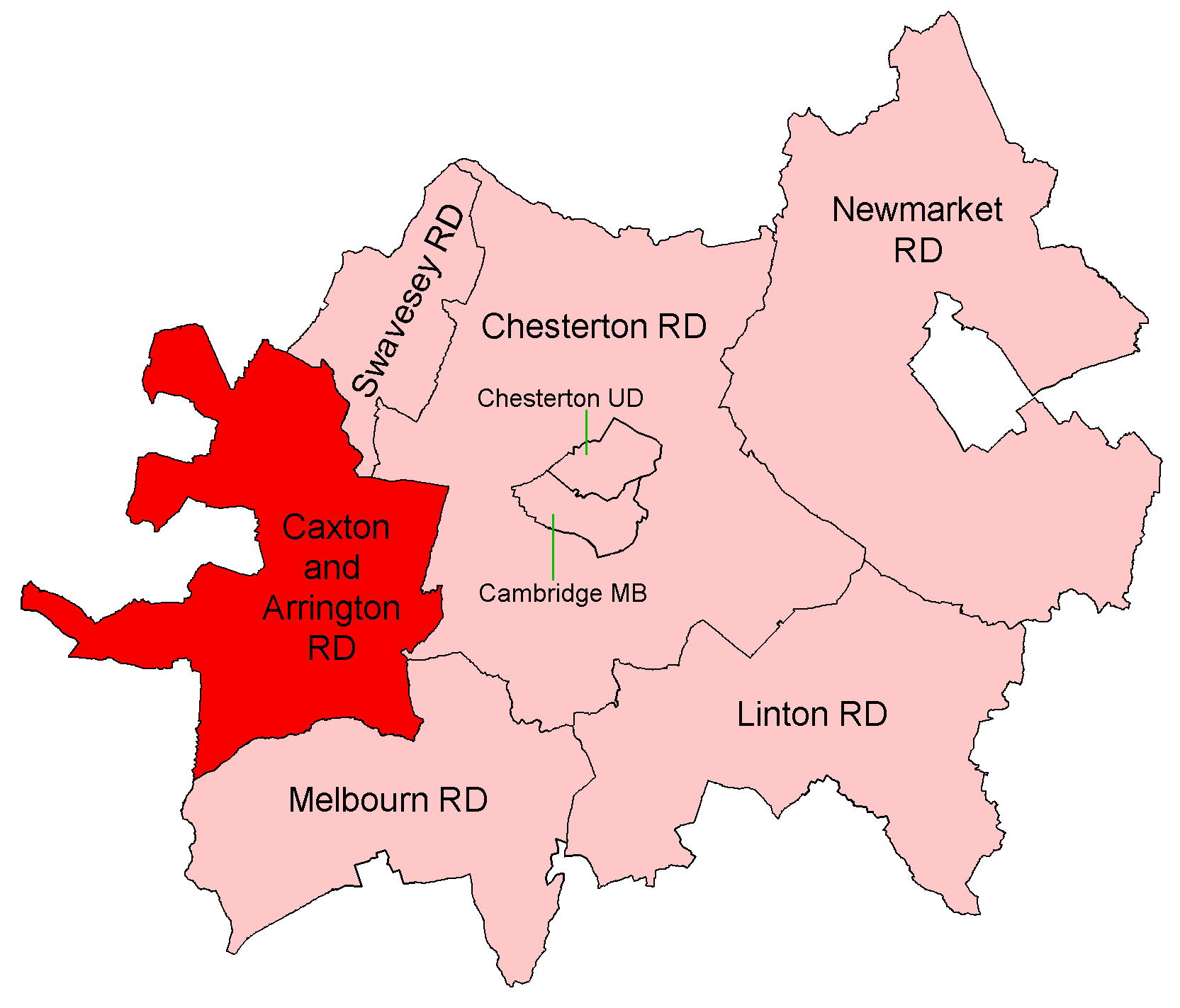
Position within Cambridgeshire

Caxton and Arrington was a rural district in Cambridgeshire, England, from 1894 to 1934.

It was formed in 1894 under the Local Government Act 1894, covering the area of the previous Caxton rural sanitary district, save for the Huntingdonshire parishes of Great Gransden and Yelling, which were placed in the St Neots Rural District; to which was added Graveley from St Neots RSD. It therefore included the parishes of Arrington, Bourn, Caldecote, Caxton, Croxton, Croydon, East Hatley, Elsworth, Eltisley, Gamlingay, Graveley, Great Eversden, Hardwick, Hatley St George, Kingston, Knapwell, Little Eversden, Little Gransden, Longstowe, Orwell, Papworth Everard, Papworth St Agnes, Tadlow, Toft, and Wimpole.

In 1934 under a County Review Order, it was abolished, and its area divided between Chesterton Rural District and the new South Cambridgeshire Rural District.
