= Grade II* listed buildings in South Cambridgeshire =

There are over 20,000 Grade II* listed buildings in England. This page is a list of these buildings in the district of South Cambridgeshire in Cambridgeshire.

== List ==
Name	Location	Type	Completed (Note: The date given is the date used by Historic England as significant for the initial building or that of an important part in the structure's description.)	Date designated	Grid ref. (Note: The grid reference is based on the British national grid reference system, sometimes known as OSGB36, used by the Ordnance Survey.) Geo-coordinates	Entry number (Note: The "List Entry Number" is a unique number assigned to each listed building and scheduled monument by Historic England.)	Image
Gatehouse c.65M to North West of Down Hall	Abington Pigotts, South Cambridgeshire	Moat	Early 16th century	22 November 1967	TL3047043735; 52°04′36″N 0°05′51″W	1128303	Gatehouse c.65M to North West of Down Hall More images
Manor Farmhouse	Abington Pigotts	Farmhouse	After 1680	22 November 1967	TL3039344813; 52°05′11″N 0°05′54″W	1330849	Upload Photo
Parish Church of St Michael and All Angels	Abington Pigotts	Parish Church	12th century	22 November 1967	TL3043944663; 52°05′06″N 0°05′52″W	1128297	Parish Church of St Michael and All Angels More images
The Almshouses & School House	Babraham	House	1959-60	22 November 1967	TL5129750419; 52°07′53″N 0°12′32″E	1127746	The Almshouses & School House More images
Newlyn	Barrington	House	Early 14th Century	22 November 1967	TL3909849700; 52°07′41″N 0°01′50″E	1161944	Newlyn More images
Royal Oak Inn	Barrington	House, now Pub	Mid 15th Century	22 November 1967	TL3898249478; 52°07′34″N 0°01′44″E	1127606	Royal Oak Inn More images
Church of St Peter	Barton	Parish Church	14th century	31 August 1962	TL4078455726; 52°10′55″N 0°03′28″E	1127829	Church of St Peter More images
Manor Farmhouse	Barton	Farmhouse	Early 17th century	31 August 1962	TL4090955761; 52°10′56″N 0°03′34″E	1161183	Upload Photo
Pryors Hold	Barton	House	c. 1600	31 August 1982	TL4052855808; 52°10′57″N 0°03′14″E	1127828	Pryors Hold
Bourn Hall	Bourn	House/Clinic	11th century	31 August 1962	TL3226656165; 52°11′16″N 0°04′00″W	1162529	Bourn Hall More images
Manor Farmhouse	Bourn	Farmhouse	Late 13th century	31 August 1962	TL3250556674; 52°11′33″N 0°03′47″W	1127209	Upload Photo
Parish Church of St Peter	Boxworth	Parish Church	12th century	31 August 1962	TL3483364491; 52°15′43″N 0°01′33″W	1331352	Parish Church of St Peter More images
Parish Church of St Michael and All Angels	Caldecote	Parish Church	14th century	31 August 1962	TL3471356256; 52°11′17″N 0°01′51″W	1127190	Parish Church of St Michael and All Angels More images
Church of St Peter	Carlton	Parish Church	12th century	22 November 1967	TL6418552967; 52°09′02″N 0°23′54″E	1127132	Church of St Peter More images
Church of All Saints	Castle Camps	Parish Church	13th century	22 November 1967	TL6256542540; 52°03′27″N 0°22′11″E	1127134	Church of All Saints More images
Caxton Hall	Caxton	House	c. 1670	31 August 1962	TL3011158284; 52°12′27″N 0°05′50″W	1309363	Upload Photo
Caxton Manor House	Caxton	House	19th century	31 August 1962	TL3036058316; 52°12′28″N 0°05′37″W	1309423	Caxton Manor House More images
Parish Church of St Andrew	Caxton	Parish Church	13th century	31 August 1962	TL3001357807; 52°12′11″N 0°05′56″W	1127203	Parish Church of St Andrew More images
The Crown House	Caxton	House	c. 1860	31 August 1962	TL3033958377; 52°12′30″N 0°05′38″W	1162925	The Crown House
Chapel to South West of Childerley Hall	Childerley	House	Later	31 August 1962	TL3555761549; 52°14′08″N 0°00′59″W	1163081	Chapel to South West of Childerley Hall More images
Childerley Hall	Childerley	Country House	Late 16th century	31 August 1962	TL3560461579; 52°14′09″N 0°00′56″W	1127204	Childerley Hall More images
Glebe Cottage	Comberton	House	17th century or 18th century	31 August 1962	TL3839555486; 52°10′49″N 0°01′22″E	1127798	Upload Photo
Conington Hall	Conington	House	c. 1820	31 August 1962	TL3186666470; 52°16′50″N 0°04′06″W	1265942	Conington Hall More images
Parish Church of St Mary	Conington	Parish Church	14th century	31 August 1962	TL3201166059; 52°16′37″N 0°03′59″W	1226274	Parish Church of St Mary More images
Church of St James	Croxton	Parish Church	Late 13th century	31 August 1962	TL2523459226; 52°13′01″N 0°10′06″W	1127168	Church of St James More images
Croxton Park	Croxton Park, Croxton	Country House	Rebuilt c.1760	31 August 1962	TL2526159372; 52°13′06″N 0°10′04″W	1127163	Upload Photo
Church of All Saints	Croydon	Parish Church	13th century	22 November 1967	TL3154449610; 52°07′45″N 0°04′47″W	1163333	Church of All Saints More images
Church of St Peter and St Paul	Dry Drayton	Parish Church	Late 13th century	31 August 1962	TL3799961957; 52°14′19″N 0°01′10″E	1162717	Church of St Peter and St Paul More images
Building 59 (Operations Block)	South Camp, Imperial War Museum (former RAF Duxford), Duxford	Operations Block	Built 1928	1 December 2005	TL4582946139; 52°05′40″N 0°07′38″E	1391608	Building 59 (Operations Block)
Building 78 (Hangar A)	South Camp, Imperial War Museum (former RAF Duxford), Duxford	Aircraft Hangar	1917	15 February 1973	TL4584546064; 52°05′37″N 0°07′39″E	1309405	Building 78 (Hangar A)
Building 79 (hangar B)	South Camp, Imperial War Museum (former Raf Duxford), Duxford	Aircraft Hangar	1917	15 February 1973	TL4592246109; 52°05′39″N 0°07′43″E	1128126	Building 79 (hangar B) More images
Building 84 (hangar C)	South Camp, Imperial War Museum (former Raf Duxford), Duxford	Aircraft Hangar	1917	15 February 1973	TL4607946207; 52°05′42″N 0°07′52″E	1162959	Building 84 (hangar C) More images
Chapel of Hospital of St John the Baptist	Duxford	Chapel	13th century	22 November 1967	TL4850147275; 52°06′14″N 0°10′01″E	1128091	Chapel of Hospital of St John the Baptist More images
Parish Church of St John the Baptist and St Pandionia	Eltisley	Parish Church	c. 1200	31 August 1962	TL2684159664; 52°13′14″N 0°08′41″W	1127179	Parish Church of St John the Baptist and St Pandionia More images
Barn to North West of Ditton Hall	Fen Ditton	Exchange	Late 15th century or early 16th century	15 June 1977	TL4817460338; 52°13′17″N 0°10′04″E	1331306	Barn to North West of Ditton Hall More images
Biggin Abbey	Fen Ditton	Farmhouse	17th century	31 August 1962	TL4873861757; 52°14′02″N 0°10′36″E	1178408	Biggin Abbey More images
Ditton Hall	Fen Ditton	House	c. 1635	31 August 1962	TL4818360292; 52°13′15″N 0°10′04″E	1127399	Ditton Hall
Home Farmhouse	Fen Ditton	Farmhouse	17th century or earlier	22 August 1984	TL4876260165; 52°13′11″N 0°10′35″E	1331303	Home Farmhouse More images
Musgrave Farmhouse	Fen Ditton	Farmhouse	Late 16th century and earlier 17th century	11 April 1980	TL4849860268; 52°13′14″N 0°10′21″E	1331305	Musgrave Farmhouse More images
Parish Church of St Mary Virgin	Fen Ditton	Parish Church	c. 1300	31 August 1962	TL4826760371; 52°13′18″N 0°10′09″E	1127430	Parish Church of St Mary Virgin More images
The Old Rectory	Fen Ditton	Jettied House	16th century	31 August 1962	TL4823760417; 52°13′19″N 0°10′07″E	1127431	The Old Rectory More images
Parish Church of St Mary	Fen Drayton	Parish Church	Late 13th century	31 August 1962	TL3395668113; 52°17′41″N 0°02′14″W	1127229	Parish Church of St Mary More images
The Homestead	Fen Drayton	House	Early 16th century	31 August 1962	TL3395968366; 52°17′50″N 0°02′13″W	1127233	Upload Photo
The Three Tuns Inn	Fen Drayton	Jettied House	Late 15th century or early 16th century	31 August 1962	TL3390368250; 52°17′46″N 0°02′16″W	1127232	The Three Tuns Inn More images
Chrishall Grange	Fowlmere	Country House	Early 18th century	26 November 1951	TL4430642730; 52°03′51″N 0°06′13″E	1163121	Upload Photo
Garden Gates and Railings to Chrishall Grange	Fowlmere	Gate	Early 18th century	17 December 1986	TL4430742716; 52°03′51″N 0°06′13″E	1330939	Upload Photo
Church of St Vigor	Fulbourn	Church	13th century	31 August 1962	TL5206856233; 52°11′00″N 0°13′22″E	1331062	Church of St Vigor More images
Highfield House	Fulbourn	Farmhouse	16th century	31 August 1962	TL5191456356; 52°11′04″N 0°13′14″E	1331035	Upload Photo
Almhouses	Gamlingay	Terrace	1665	22 November 1967	TL2391252318; 52°09′19″N 0°11′25″W	1128179	Almhouses
Chapel adjoining Almhouses at East End	Gamlingay	Chapel	1745	3 September 1986	TL2393652316; 52°09′19″N 0°11′23″W	1318156	Chapel adjoining Almhouses at East End
Havelock House	Gamlingay	House	1688	22 November 1967	TL2374752326; 52°09′19″N 0°11′33″W	1163764	Upload Photo
The Cock Inn	Gamlingay	Jettied House	Late 16th century or early 17th century	22 November 1967	TL2382952352; 52°09′20″N 0°11′29″W	1330904	The Cock Inn
The Emplins	Gamlingay	House	16th century	21 February 1972	TL2419652309; 52°09′18″N 0°11′10″W	1309190	The Emplins More images
Church of St Andrew	Girton	Village Hall	Late 15th century	31 August 1962	TL4238062328; 52°14′27″N 0°05′02″E	1164101	Church of St Andrew More images
Girton College	Girton	Further Education College	1873	14 September 1984	TL4245060932; 52°13′41″N 0°05′03″E	1331334	Girton College More images
Church of St Andrew and St Mary	Grantchester	Parish Church	12th century	31 August 1962	TL4336655464; 52°10′44″N 0°05′43″E	1309436	Church of St Andrew and St Mary More images
Manor Farmhouse	Grantchester	Farmhouse	17th century	31 August 1962	TL4330655419; 52°10′42″N 0°05′40″E	1309385	Manor Farmhouse More images
Parish Church of St Botolph	Graveley	Parish Church	13th century	31 August 1962	TL2497864080; 52°15′39″N 0°10′13″W	1265814	Parish Church of St Botolph More images
Abington Hall (The Welding Institute)	Great Abington	Country House	1711-3	22 November 1967	TL5274148833; 52°07′00″N 0°13′46″E	1127722	Abington Hall (The Welding Institute) More images
Gildencroft	Great Abington	House	Mid 16th century	30 September 1985	TL5319248706; 52°06′56″N 0°14′09″E	1127719	Gildencroft More images
Parish Church of St Mary	Great Abington	Parish Church	c. 1200	22 November 1967	TL5307048864; 52°07′01″N 0°14′03″E	1161650	Parish Church of St Mary More images
Little Chishill Mill	Great and Little Chishill	Post Mill	1712	22 November 1967	TL4132138843; 52°01′48″N 0°03′31″E	1330927	Little Chishill Mill More images
Parish Church of St Nicolas	Little Chishill, Great and Little Chishill	Parish Church	12th century	22 November 1967	TL4184137244; 52°00′56″N 0°03′56″E	1162491	Parish Church of St Nicolas More images
Parish Church of St Swithun	Great Chishill, Great and Little Chishill	Parish Church	13th century	22 November 1967	TL4221638868; 52°01′48″N 0°04′18″E	1128142	Parish Church of St Swithun More images
Church of St Mary	Great Eversden	Parish Church	Late Medieval	22 November 1967	TL3665453329; 52°09′41″N 0°00′13″W	1127621	Church of St Mary More images
The Manor House	Great Eversden	Moat	c. 1600	22 November 1967	TL3598353761; 52°09′55″N 0°00′48″W	1127584	The Manor House
Rectory Farmhouse	Great Shelford	Farmhouse	18th century and 19th century	31 August 1962	TL4570951861; 52°08′45″N 0°07′41″E	1331067	Upload Photo
Church of St Nicholas	Great Wilbraham	Parish Church	12th century	31 August 1962	TL5483757760; 52°11′47″N 0°15′50″E	1317779	Church of St Nicholas More images
Outbuilding at Wilbraham Temple	Great Wilbraham	Manor House	Late 15th century	31 August 1962	TL5532157969; 52°11′53″N 0°16′16″E	1164558	Upload Photo
Wilbraham Temple	Great Wilbraham	House	Late 17th century	31 August 1962	TL5533457945; 52°11′52″N 0°16′17″E	1127875	Upload Photo
Morden Hall	Guilden Morden	Farmhouse	18th century	22 November 1967	TL2846843953; 52°04′45″N 0°07′36″W	1128236	Upload Photo
Parish Church of St Mary	Hardwick	Parish Church	Earlier 14th century	31 August 1962	TL3722958607; 52°12′31″N 0°00′25″E	1163557	Parish Church of St Mary More images
Church of All Saints	Harston	Church	Early Medieval	31 August 1962	TL4180650967; 52°08′20″N 0°04′14″E	1331060	Church of All Saints More images
Harston House and Part of Garden Wall	Harston	House	c. 1710	31 August 1962	TL4224650831; 52°08′15″N 0°04′37″E	1317695	Upload Photo
Manor House	Harston	House	Early 18th century	31 August 1962	TL4183850933; 52°08′19″N 0°04′16″E	1127877	Manor House
Haslingfield Manor	Haslingfield	Manor House	Mid 16th century	31 August 1962	TL4055352308; 52°09′04″N 0°03′11″E	1331121	Upload Photo
Church of St Denis	East Hatley, Hatley	Parish Church	13th century	22 November 1967	TL2852450513; 52°08′17″N 0°07′24″W	1128153	Church of St Denis More images
Church of St George	Hatley St George, Hatley	Parish Church	14th century	22 November 1967	TL2773351126; 52°08′37″N 0°08′05″W	1128154	Church of St George More images
Hatley Park	Hatley St George, Hatley	Country House	17th century	22 November 1967	TL2759750979; 52°08′33″N 0°08′13″W	1317995	Hatley Park More images
Holy Trinity Parish Church	Heydon	Parish Church	Late 15th century	17 December 1986	TL4324739980; 52°02′23″N 0°05′14″E	1309193	Holy Trinity Parish Church More images
Burford Farmhouse	Hildersham	Farmhouse	17th century	22 November 1967	TL5442648400; 52°06′45″N 0°15′14″E	1161908	Upload Photo
Hildersham Hall	Hildersham	Farmhouse	17th century	17 March 1978	TL5427948339; 52°06′43″N 0°15′06″E	1161818	Upload Photo
Mabbutts	Hildersham	Farmhouse	Mid 16th century	22 November 1967	TL5453748620; 52°06′52″N 0°15′20″E	1309917	Mabbutts More images
Hinxton Hall	Hinxton	Country House	1748-1756	22 November 1967	TL4980344824; 52°04′53″N 0°11′05″E	1330969	Hinxton Hall More images
Parish Church of St Mary and St John the Evangelist	Hinxton	Parish Church	c. 1200	22 November 1967	TL4970745175; 52°05′05″N 0°11′01″E	1163553	Parish Church of St Mary and St John the Evangelist More images
The Oak House	Hinxton	House	c. 1930	22 November 1967	TL4944645491; 52°05′15″N 0°10′47″E	1128078	The Oak House More images
The Old Manor House	Hinxton	Jettied House	c. 1580	22 November 1967	TL4959945096; 52°05′02″N 0°10′55″E	1330970	The Old Manor House More images
The Olde House	Histon	House	17th century	31 August 1962	TL4388263520; 52°15′04″N 0°06′23″E	1127408	Upload Photo
Barn to North of Abbey Farmhouse	Ickleton	Barn	Early 14th century	6 June 1986	TL4896743765; 52°04′20″N 0°10′19″E	1165037	Upload Photo
Mowbrays	Ickleton	Farmhouse	Late 17th century	22 November 1967	TL4946743820; 52°04′21″N 0°10′46″E	1330960	Upload Photo
Padcot	Ickleton	House	Early 17th century	22 November 1967	TL4910643599; 52°04′14″N 0°10′27″E	1330956	Upload Photo
Impington Mill	Impington	Windmill	Early 19th century	31 August 1962	TL4415162328; 52°14′25″N 0°06′35″E	1127378	Impington Mill More images
House on the Green	Kingston	Cross Passage House	Late 15th century	7 June 1979	TL3455955075; 52°10′39″N 0°02′01″W	1127596	Upload Photo
Kingston Wood Farmhouse	Kingston	Cross Passage House	Late 15th century or early 16th century	22 November 1967	TL3276754008; 52°10′06″N 0°03′36″W	1127595	Upload Photo
The Old Rectory	Kingston	House	late C16/early 17th century	22 November 1967	TL3465855433; 52°10′51″N 0°01′55″W	1163215	Upload Photo
Parish Church of All Saints	Knapwell	Parish Church	14th century	31 August 1962	TL3357963013; 52°14′57″N 0°02′41″W	1163735	Parish Church of All Saints More images
The Old Rectory	Landbeach	Farmhouse	Early 16th century	31 August 1962	TL4769665324; 52°15′58″N 0°09′47″E	1178950	Upload Photo
Barham Hall	Linton	Farmhouse	Early 16th century	22 November 1967	TL5740646094; 52°05′27″N 0°17′46″E	1161958	Barham Hall More images
Chandlers or Chaundlers	Linton	House	17th century	29 October 1955	TL5628146825; 52°05′52″N 0°16′48″E	1127670	Chandlers or Chaundlers
Linton House	Linton	House	Late 17th century	22 November 1967	TL5618646804; 52°05′51″N 0°16′43″E	1331158	Linton House
Queens House	Linton	House	1731	22 November 1967	TL5593846632; 52°05′46″N 0°16′30″E	1127677	Queens House
The Guildhall	Linton	House	1697	22 November 1967	TL5616246713; 52°05′48″N 0°16′42″E	1331166	The Guildhall More images
1 and 3 Coles Lane	Linton	House	Late 17th century	22 November 1967	TL5620346834; 52°05′52″N 0°16′44″E	1127668	1 and 3 Coles Lane
87 and 89 High Street	Linton	Jettied House	16th century or earlier	22 November 1967	TL5627546823; 52°05′52″N 0°16′48″E	1127669	Upload Photo
Parish Church of St Catherine	Litlington	Parish Church	12th century	22 November 1967	TL3098442747; 52°04′03″N 0°05′26″W	1128238	Parish Church of St Catherine More images
Abington Pottery	Little Abington	House	Mid-Late 16th century	22 November 1967	TL5330849176; 52°07′11″N 0°14′16″E	1127657	Abington Pottery More images
Parish Church of St Mary the Virgin	Little Abington	Parish Church	11th century	22 November 1967	TL5295049197; 52°07′12″N 0°13′57″E	1309328	Parish Church of St Mary the Virgin More images
Church of St Helen	Little Eversden	Parish Church	14th century	22 November 1967	TL3748853288; 52°09′39″N 0°00′31″E	1309238	Church of St Helen More images
Five Gables Farmhouse	Little Eversden	Cross Wing House	17th century	22 November 1967	TL3697253433; 52°09′44″N 0°00′04″E	1163252	Five Gables Farmhouse More images
Church of Saint Peter and Saint Paul	Little Gransden	Parish Church	Mid 13th century	22 November 1967	TL2708355174; 52°10′49″N 0°08′34″W	1317971	Church of Saint Peter and Saint Paul More images
Church of All Saints	Little Shelford	Parish Church	12th century	31 August 1962	TL4534551664; 52°08′39″N 0°07′22″E	1164832	Church of All Saints More images
Little Shelford Manor	Little Shelford	House	Earlier	31 August 1962	TL4554851810; 52°08′43″N 0°07′32″E	1127852	Upload Photo
Church of St John the Evangelist	Little Wilbraham	Church	11th century or 12th century	31 August 1962	TL5456358600; 52°12′14″N 0°15′37″E	1167060	Church of St John the Evangelist More images
Parish Church of All Saints	Lolworth	Cross	Early 12th century	31 August 1962	TL3689064183; 52°15′32″N 0°00′15″E	1127241	Parish Church of All Saints More images
Church of St Michael	Longstanton	Church	Early 13th century	31 August 1962	TL4029365854; 52°16′23″N 0°03′17″E	1127298	Church of St Michael More images
Church of St Mary	Longstowe	Parish Church	C14-C15	22 November 1967	TL3106355430; 52°10′54″N 0°05′04″W	1128165	Church of St Mary More images
Church of St Mary Magdalene	Madingley	Parish Church	13th century	31 August 1962	TL3950460336; 52°13′25″N 0°02′27″E	1127740	Church of St Mary Magdalene More images
Gateway to Stable Courtyard at Madingley Hall	Madingley	Gate	1758	31 August 1962	TL3927060444; 52°13′29″N 0°02′15″E	1127741	Upload Photo
Madingley Mill, at Mill Farm, Madingley Hill	Madingley	Post Mill	1936	31 August 1962	TL4079559513; 52°12′57″N 0°03′34″E	1163652	Madingley Mill, at Mill Farm, Madingley Hill More images
Memorial and attached Walls, Steps and Pool Surround at American Military Cemetery	Madingley Road, Madingley, CB23	Boundary Wall	1952-1954	25 September 1998	TL4051159550; 52°12′59″N 0°03′19″E	1376611	Memorial and attached Walls, Steps and Pool Surround at American Military Cemetery More images
The Manor House	Madingley	Jettied House	15th century	31 August 1962	TL3955060626; 52°13′34″N 0°02′30″E	1127744	The Manor House
Parish Church of All Saints	Melbourn	Parish Church	13th century	18 October 1985	TL3821844833; 52°05′05″N 0°00′57″E	1127546	Parish Church of All Saints More images
The Manor House	Melbourn	Manor House	Early 18th century	22 November 1967	TL3818844645; 52°04′59″N 0°00′55″E	1318037	Upload Photo
Milton House	Milton	House	c. 1768	31 August 1962	TL4794562697; 52°14′33″N 0°09′56″E	1127351	Milton House More images
Parish Church of All Saints	Milton	Parish Church	Norman	31 August 1962	TL4802062883; 52°14′39″N 0°10′00″E	1127349	Parish Church of All Saints More images
Church of St Margaret	Newton	Parish Church	13th century	31 August 1962	TL4353049159; 52°07′20″N 0°05′42″E	1331108	Church of St Margaret More images
The Cottage	Newton	Garage	Added 1907-8	29 August 1984	TL4393449233; 52°07′22″N 0°06′04″E	1165063	Upload Photo
Church of St Andrew	Oakington and Westwick	Parish Church	Early 13th century	31 August 1962	TL4149264799; 52°15′47″N 0°04′19″E	1164356	Church of St Andrew More images
Malton Farmhouse	Orwell	Farmhouse	15th century	26 October 1982	TL3733448310; 52°06′58″N 0°00′15″E	1128354	Upload Photo
Parish Church of St John the Baptist	Pampisford	Parish Church	12th century	22 November 1967	TL4977548248; 52°06′44″N 0°11′09″E	1163297	Parish Church of St John the Baptist More images
Papworth Hall	Papworth Everard	Country House	1809-13	31 August 1962	TL2886962742; 52°14′52″N 0°06′50″W	1226279	Papworth Hall More images
Parish Church of St Peter	Papworth Everard	Parish Church	13th century	31 August 1962	TL2826662644; 52°14′49″N 0°07′22″W	1226356	Parish Church of St Peter More images
Parish Church of St John the Baptist	Papworth St Agnes	Parish Church	1530	31 August 1962	TL2693564481; 52°15′50″N 0°08′29″W	1331388	Parish Church of St John the Baptist More images
Church of All Saints	Rampton	Parish Church	12th century	31 August 1962	TL4285268111; 52°17′33″N 0°05′35″E	1127273	Church of All Saints More images
Great Eastern Drying Shed, Large Tannery Building at Hutchings and Hardings Limited	Sawston	Leather Drying Shed	Mid 19th century	10 September 1987	TL4867848866; 52°07′05″N 0°10′12″E	1127985	Upload Photo
Queen's Head Inn	Sawston	Timber Framed House	Late 15th century	22 November 1967	TL4863149178; 52°07′15″N 0°10′10″E	1317362	Queen's Head Inn More images
Church of All Saints	Shepreth	Parish Church	12th century	22 November 1967	TL3928247479; 52°06′29″N 0°01′57″E	1330821	Church of All Saints More images
Docwras Manor	Shepreth	Kitchen	16th century	22 November 1967	TL3924647967; 52°06′45″N 0°01′55″E	1128332	Docwras Manor More images
Glebe House	Wendy	House	c. 1828	22 November 1967	TL3230647617; 52°06′40″N 0°04′10″W	1330864	Upload Photo
Bramleys	Shudy Camps	Base Cruck House	14th century	2 January 1986	TL6168044912; 52°04′44″N 0°21′29″E	1331018	Upload Photo
Church of St Mary	Shudy Camps	Parish Church	13th century	22 November 1967	TL6205944411; 52°04′28″N 0°21′48″E	1127948	Church of St Mary More images
Church of St Andrew	Stapleford	Cross	Saxon	31 August 1962	TL4709652114; 52°08′52″N 0°08′54″E	1165349	Church of St Andrew More images
Middlefield and Garden Wall	Stapleford	House	1908	29 August 1984	TL4799152892; 52°09′16″N 0°09′43″E	1317370	Middlefield and Garden Wall More images
Parish Church of St Peter and St Paul	Steeple Morden	Parish Church	Late 13th century	22 November 1967	TL2857342467; 52°03′56″N 0°07′33″W	1164121	Parish Church of St Peter and St Paul More images
Parish Church of St Mary	Stow cum Quy	Parish Church	12th century	31 August 1962	TL5158559902; 52°12′59″N 0°13′03″E	1179413	Parish Church of St Mary More images
Quy Hall	Stow cum Quy	Country House	Probably late C15-C16	22 August 1984	TL5153661135; 52°13′39″N 0°13′02″E	1331325	Quy Hall More images
The Vicarage	Stow cum Quy	Vicarage	1887	22 August 1984	TL5206260478; 52°13′17″N 0°13′29″E	1301981	Upload Photo
Ryder's Farmhouse	Swavesey	Farmhouse	Late 13th century	11 April 1980	TL3636268324; 52°17′46″N 0°00′07″W	1164456	Upload Photo
Church of St Giles	Tadlow	Parish Church	13th century	22 November 1967	TL2799747613; 52°06′43″N 0°07′56″W	1317879	Church of St Giles More images
Church of All Saints	Teversham	Parish Church	13th century	31 August 1962	TL4962058531; 52°12′17″N 0°11′17″E	1331278	Church of All Saints More images
Bassetts	Thriplow	Farmhouse	Late 16th century	22 November 1967	TL4358946376; 52°05′50″N 0°05′41″E	1317239	Upload Photo
Parish Church of St George	Thriplow	Parish Church	13th century	22 November 1967	TL4420546956; 52°06′08″N 0°06′14″E	1128042	Parish Church of St George More images
The Manor House	Thriplow	House	c. 1800	22 November 1967	TL4390446414; 52°05′50″N 0°05′58″E	1128012	The Manor House
Thriplow Bury	Thriplow	House	c. 1713	22 November 1967	TL4354346186; 52°05′43″N 0°05′38″E	1317262	Upload Photo
Parish Church of St Andrew	Toft	Parish Church	Eartlier	31 August 1962	TL3623155778; 52°11′00″N 0°00′32″W	1127146	Parish Church of St Andrew More images
Church of St John	Waterbeach	Parish Church	c. 1200	31 August 1962	TL4973765099; 52°15′49″N 0°11′34″E	1127366	Church of St John More images
Church of St Mary	West Wickham	Parish Church	13th century	22 November 1967	TL6120649214; 52°07′04″N 0°21′11″E	1127918	Church of St Mary More images
Church of St Andrew	West Wratting	Parish Church	Medieval	22 November 1967	TL6060852348; 52°08′46″N 0°20′45″E	1165084	Church of St Andrew More images
Concordia House	West Wratting	House	Late 18th century	22 November 1967	TL6119151746; 52°08′26″N 0°21′15″E	1127932	Upload Photo
West Wratting Park House	West Wratting	House	c. 1730	22 November 1967	TL6103051577; 52°08′20″N 0°21′06″E	1127902	West Wratting Park House More images
Windmill at Mill Cottage	West Wratting	Smock Mill	1726	11 April 1986	TL6055051010; 52°08′03″N 0°20′40″E	1165266	Windmill at Mill Cottage More images
Church of St Mary	Weston Colville	Parish Church	Medieval	22 November 1967	TL6161953152; 52°09′11″N 0°21′39″E	1164509	Church of St Mary More images
Rectory Farmhouse	Whaddon	Farmhouse	Early 14th century	22 November 1967	TL3522246547; 52°06′03″N 0°01′38″W	1128193	Upload Photo
The Grange	Dyers Green, Whaddon	Farmhouse	Early 18th century	18 June 1986	TL3507745535; 52°05′30″N 0°01′47″W	1128228	Upload Photo
Rayners Farmhouse	Whittlesford	Farmhouse	Late 16th century	22 November 1967	TL4655348598; 52°06′59″N 0°08′20″E	1128023	Upload Photo
The Guildhall	Whittlesford	House	Late 15th century or early 16th century	22 November 1967	TL4727948313; 52°06′49″N 0°08′58″E	1165789	The Guildhall More images
Cattell's Mill	Willingham	Windmill	1828	31 August 1962	TL4042869748; 52°18′28″N 0°03′30″E	1164972	Cattell's Mill More images
Church of St Andrew	Wimpole	Parish Church	Medieval	22 November 1967	TL3364750998; 52°08′28″N 0°02′54″W	1330900	Church of St Andrew More images
Folly Castle about 3/4 Mile North of Wimpole Hall	Wimpole	Folly	1768-70	22 November 1967	TL3345252076; 52°09′03″N 0°03′03″W	1317807	Folly Castle about 3/4 Mile North of Wimpole Hall More images
Stable Block, about 250 Yards South East of Wimpole Hall	Wimpole	Courtyard	1852	3 September 1986	TL3377050942; 52°08′26″N 0°02′48″W	1164273	Stable Block, about 250 Yards South East of Wimpole Hall More images
The Great Barn, at Park Farm, about Half Mile North East of Wimpole	Old Wimpole, Wimpole	Barn	Later	3 September 1986	TL3407951408; 52°08′41″N 0°02′31″W	1317761	The Great Barn, at Park Farm, about Half Mile North East of Wimpole More images
