= Croxton =

Croxton may refer to:

== Places ==
- Croxton, Cambridgeshire, England
- Croxton, Lincolnshire, England
- Croxton, Jersey City, New Jersey, USA
- Croxton, Norfolk, England
- Croxton, Staffordshire, England
- Croxton Kerrial, a village and parish in Leicestershire, England
- Croxton railway station, Melbourne, Australia

== Other ==
- Croxton Play of the Sacrament
- Croxton Records, a record label founded by Mick Thomas and Nick Corr
- Croxton (automobile), a defunct USA car manufacturer
