= Swavesey Rural District =

Former local government area in the UK

Coordinates: 52.302°N 0.005°E

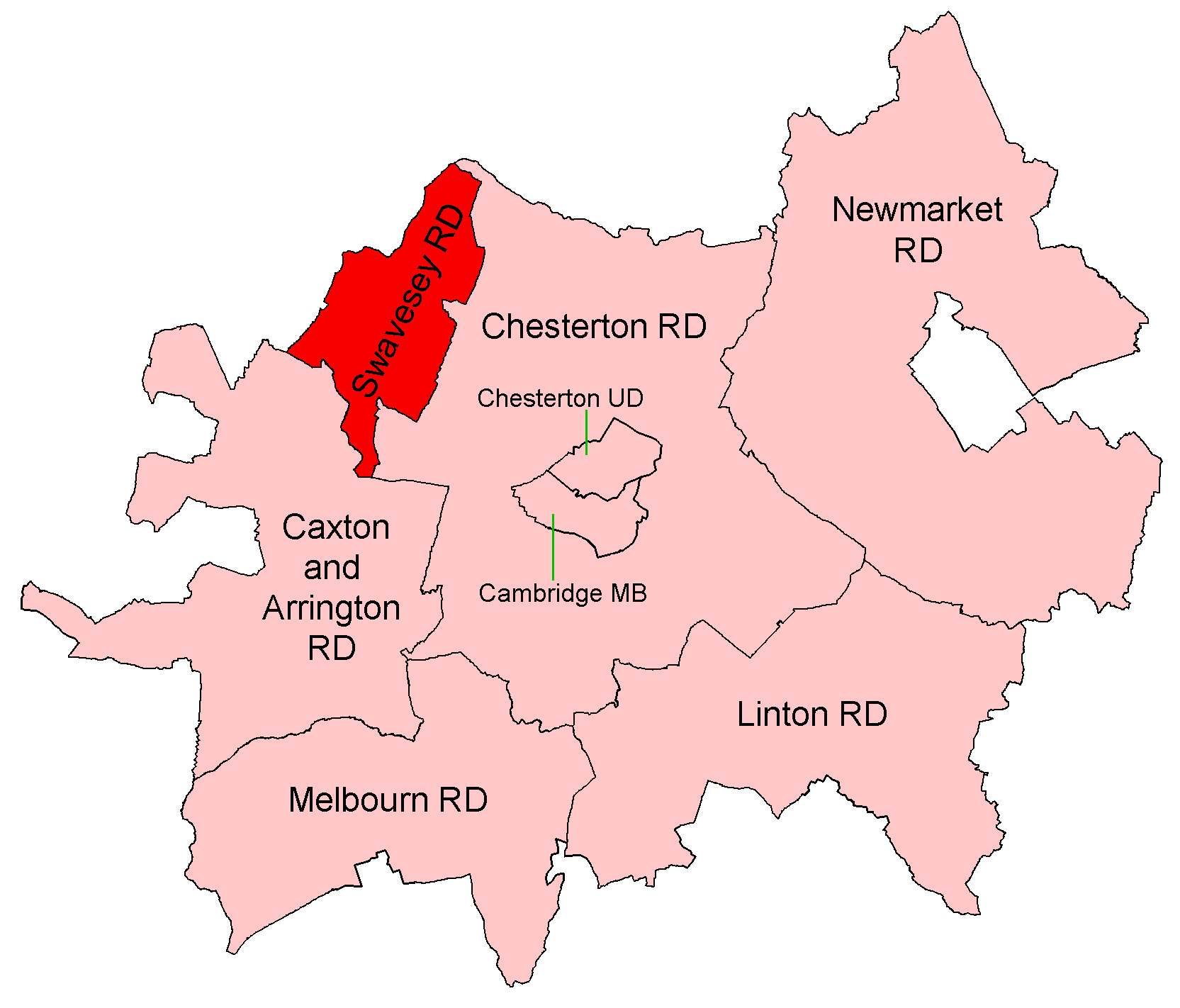
Position within Cambridgeshire

Swavesey was a rural district in Cambridgeshire, England, from 1894 to 1934.

It was formed under the Local Government Act 1894 from the part of the St Ives rural sanitary district which was in Cambridgeshire (the rest being in Huntingdonshire).

It covered the civil parishes of

- Boxworth
- Conington
- Fen Drayton
- Lolworth
- Over
- Swavesey

In 1925 Dr. W. R. Grove, the medical officer for health reported that Swavesey Rural District had an area of 14445 acres with a population which grew from 2424 in 1921 to 2487 in 1925.

It was merged in 1934 under a County Review Order into the Chesterton Rural District. It now forms part of the South Cambridgeshire district.
