= Abington Hall, Cambridgeshire =

Historic house in Cambridgeshire, England

Abington Hall
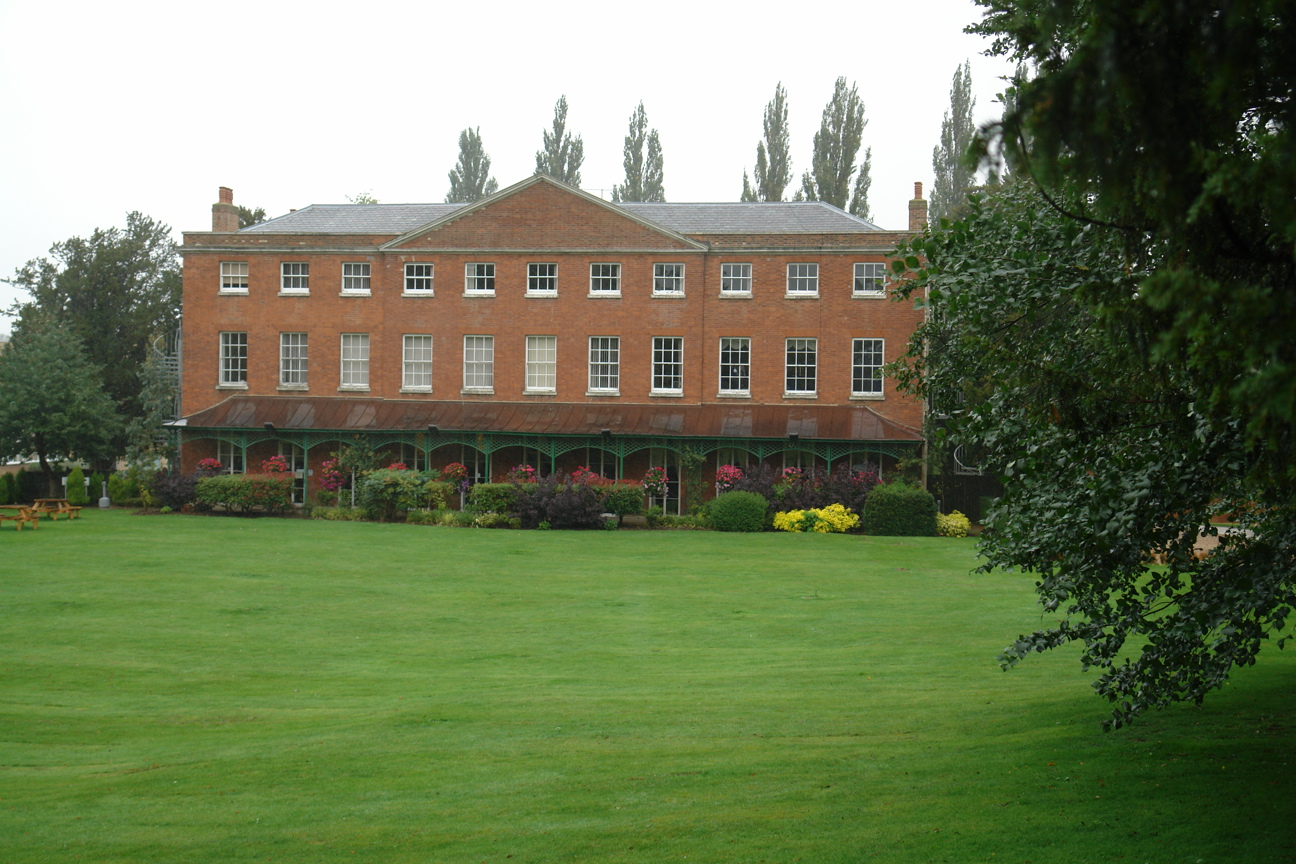
- Abington Hall in 2013
- Alternative names: Great Abington Hall

General information
- Type: Country house
- Location: Great Abington, United Kingdom
- Year built: 1711-1713
- Client: Maximilian Western
- Owner: TWI Ltd. (1946-present)

Technical details
- Floor count: 3

Design and construction
- Architects: Richard Humberstone; Robert Grumbold

Website
- twi-global.com

Abington Hall (historically also known as Great Abington Hall) is a Grade II* listed early-18th-century country house in Great Abington, Cambridgeshire, England. Built between 1711 and 1713 for Maximilian Western, the hall and its surrounding parkland were later remodelled by Cambridge banker John Mortlock and landscape designer Humphry Repton. Since 1946, the hall has served as the headquarters of TWI Ltd at Granta Park.

== Architecture ==
Abington Hall is a three-storey, nine-bay Georgian country house constructed of red brick that was painted white around 1815. The principal façade features a central entrance portico and stone dressings, overlooking landscaped parkland sloping down toward the River Granta. On 22 November 1967, Historic England designated the building as Grade II* listed in recognition of its architectural and historic significance.

== History ==
=== Construction and the Western family (1706–1779) ===
18th-century engraving of Abington Hall

In 1706, London merchant Maximilian Western purchased the manor of Great Abington from the Bennet family. Rather than retaining the medieval manor house that previously stood on the grounds, Western demolished it and commissioned a new residence built between 1711 and 1713 under the direction of surveyor Richard Humberstone, with craftsmanship led by Cambridge master mason Robert Grumbold.

Following Western's death around 1720, the estate passed to his son and remained in the Western family until 1779.

=== The Mortlock family and 19th-century estate (1779–1929) ===
In 1779, the estate was purchased by Cambridge banker and politician John Mortlock, who carried out substantial alterations to the house. Around 1800, Mortlock commissioned landscape architect Humphry Repton to lay out the surrounding parkland.

During the early 19th century, the hall was leased to John Pitt, 2nd Earl of Chatham, during whose tenancy the exterior brickwork was first painted around 1815. The Mortlock family retained ownership of the estate for 150 years until breaking up and auctioning the property in 1929—a sale that also separated outlying estate buildings, including North Lodge (later The Temple).

=== TWI Ltd and Granta Park (1946–present) ===
In 1946, the hall and grounds were acquired by the British Welding Research Association (now TWI Ltd), establishing the site as a major research centre that later expanded into the surrounding Granta Park science campus. Following a major conservation and interior refurbishment completed in 2022, Abington Hall continues to serve as TWI's executive offices, conference space, and hospitality centre.

== See also ==
- Grade II* listed buildings in South Cambridgeshire
