= Overhall Grove =

Nature reserve in Cambridgeshire, England

Coordinates: 52.249°N 0.042°W

- Site of Special Scientific Interest
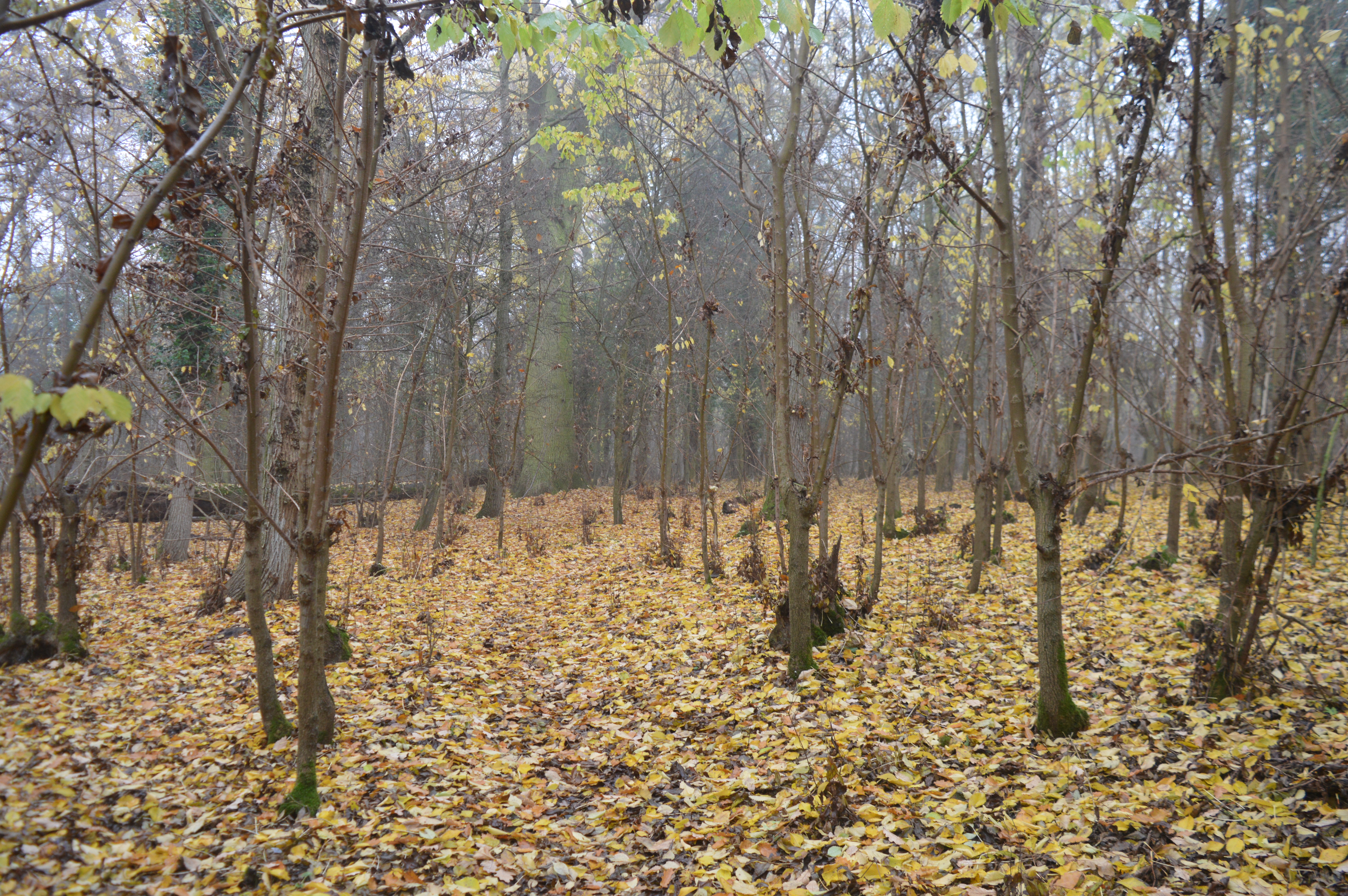
- Location of Overhall Grove.
- Area of search: Cambridgeshire
- Grid reference: TL 338 630
- Interest: Biological
- Area: 17.4 hectares
- Notification date: 1984
- Location map: Magic Map

Overhall Grove is a 17.4-hectare (43-acre) biological Site of Special Scientific Interest to the east of Knapwell in Cambridgeshire. It is a Nature Conservation Review site, Grade II, and it is managed by the Wildlife Trust for Bedfordshire, Cambridgeshire and Northamptonshire.

This site is the largest elm woodland in the county. It was seriously affected by Dutch elm disease, but many trees have regenerated from their bases, and the mixture of new growth and dead wood provides a very good habitat for insects and birds. There are the remains of a medieval manor and moat at the northern end, and a family of badgers have unearthed pottery dating back to the eleventh century. The ecological value of the site is enhanced by a stream, ponds, clearings and rides.

There is access by a footpath from Knapwell High Street.
