= Conington =

Conington, an English placename, could be

- Conington, Huntingdonshire, Cambridgeshire, about 15 km from Huntingdon
- Conington, South Cambridgeshire, Cambridgeshire, 10 km from Huntingdon
