= List of churches in Cambridgeshire =

Lists of churches in Cambridgeshire, England, may be found in the six lists for each of the ceremonial county's constituent districts. A summary of statistics is given below.

District	Cambridge	South Cambs	Huntingdonshire	East Cambs	Fenland	Peterborough	Total
	List	List	List	List	List	List	
Total churches	97	147	131	71	52	84	582
Population (2016 est.)	131,800	156,500	175,700	87,800	100,200	197,100	849,100
Inhabitants per church	1,359	1,065	1,341	1,237	1,927	2,346	1,459
By denomination*
Church of England	46^{1}	102	84	40	23	3	334
Methodist	4	9	13	11	1	7	54
Baptist Union	6	17	6	7	3	6	45
United Reformed	3	13	3	3	4	3	29
Roman Catholic	6	2	6	2	4	6	26
FIEC	4	2	3	2		1	12
Others	30	9	18	9	1	2	103

*numbers may not add to total due to some churches counting towards more than one denomination

^{1}includes twenty college chapels
