= John Mortlock =

British banker (1755–1816)

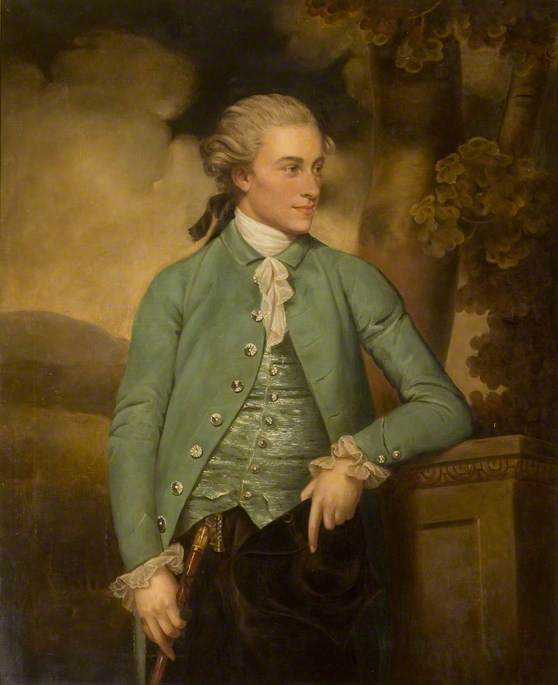
Portrait in The Guildhall, Cambridge (c. 1779)

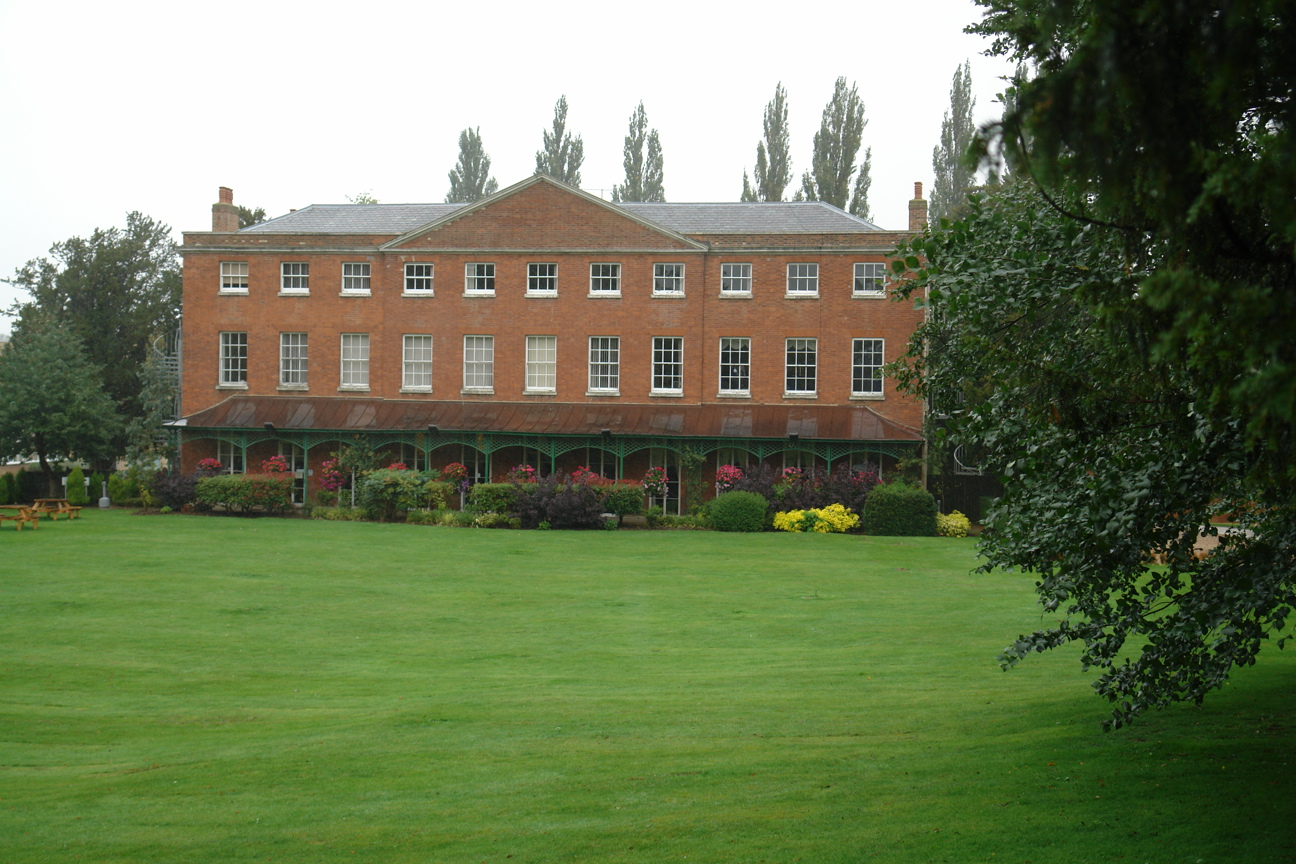
Abington Hall near Cambridge, Mortlock's country house

John Mortlock (1755–1816) was a British banker, Member of Parliament and 13 times mayor of Cambridge.

== Biography ==
Mortlock was the only son of John Mortlock, a prosperous woollen draper of Cambridge. He succeeded his father in the business in 1777. His family seat was Abington Hall in Abington Magna outside Cambridge.

In 1778 Mortlock bought himself the Freedom of Cambridge for £40. In 1780 he founded the first bank in Cambridge. Mortlock's bank, which was originally situated on the corner of Rose Crescent and then moved to Bene't Street, would be run by members of the Mortlock family for over one hundred years. In 1896 the bank was amalgamated with Barclays & Co. There is a blue plaque commemorating Mortlock on the former Barclays Bank building in Bene't Street. In 1782 Mortlock became an alderman, then mayor and, in 1784, the Member of Parliament for Cambridge.

Mortlock, who was a great friend and supporter of Pitt the Younger, was called corrupt by his political opponents, though as the plaque suggests he had a different view of things:"without influence, which you call corruption, men will not be induced to support government, though they generally approve of its measures".

In 1792 he was appointed to the lucrative post of Receiver General of the Post Office, a position he held until 1806.

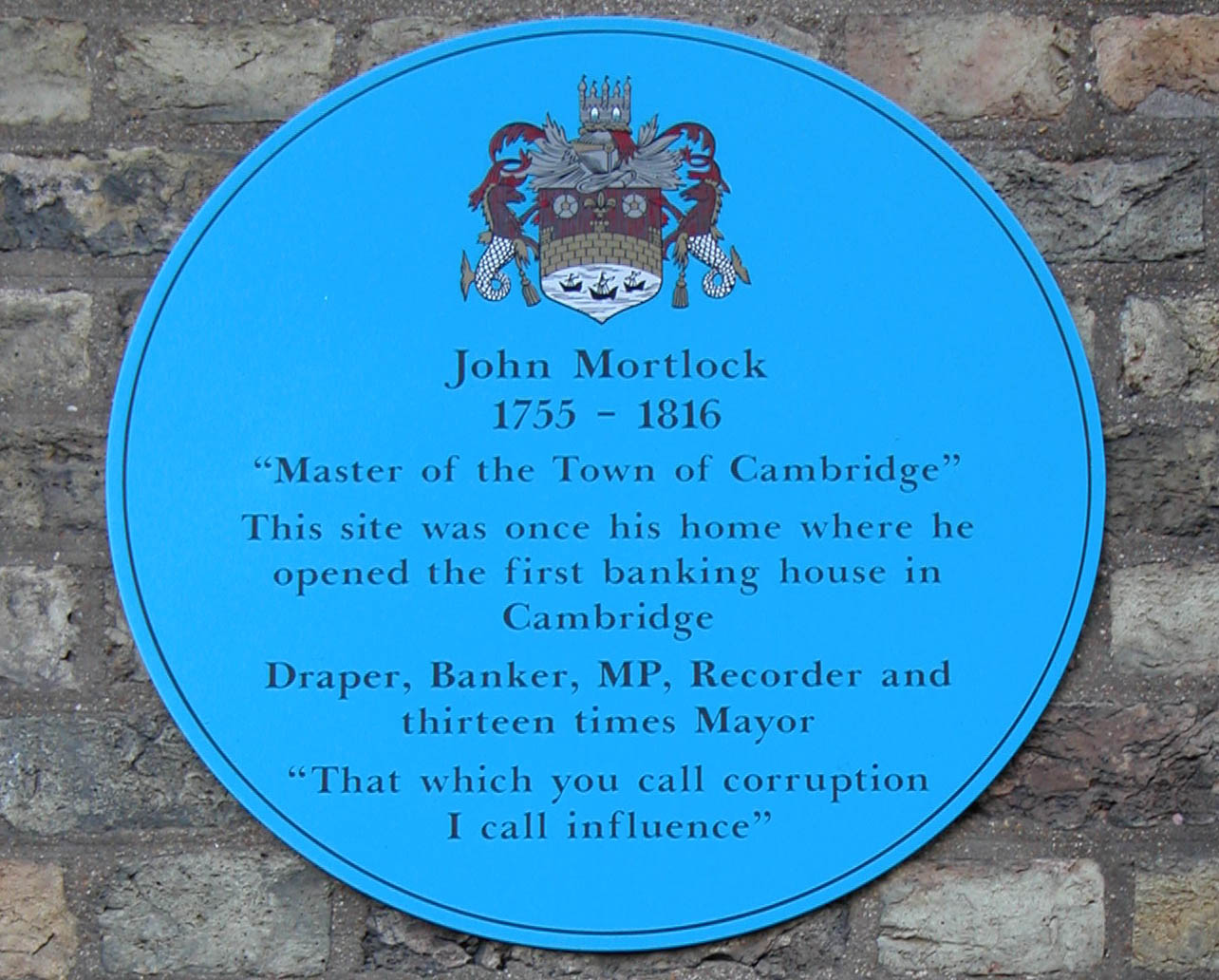
"That which you call corruption I call influence" - The quotation on the plaque.

He died in 1816. He had married Elizabeth, the daughter of grocer Stephen Harrison, and with her had eight sons and two daughters. A son, John Cheetham Mortlock, was knighted. A grandson John Frederick Mortlock wrote an account of his transportation to Australia and another grandson Frederick William Mortlock worked in customs in Jamaica.
