= Croxton Play of the Sacrament =

English miracle play (circa 1491)

The Croxton Play of the Sacrament is the only surviving English Host miracle play. The play centers around the abduction of a Eucharistic Host by a group of Jewish men, and the series of miracles that lead to their conversion of Christianity.

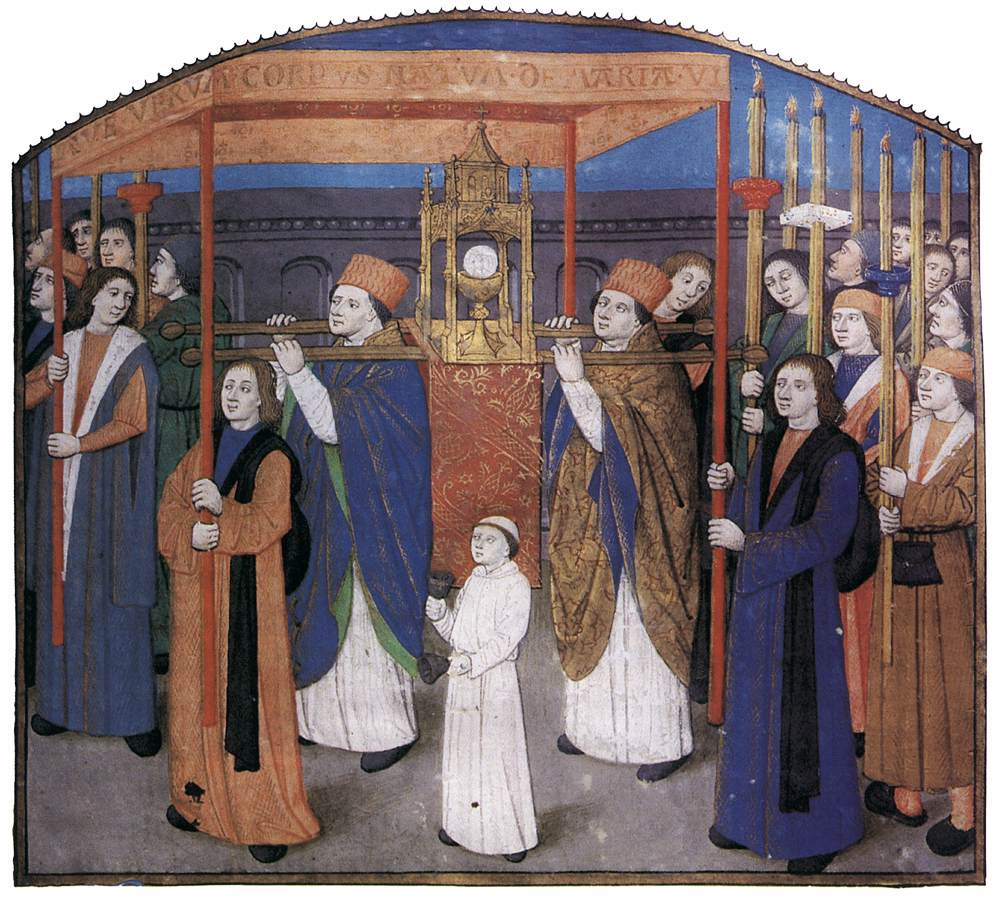
A medieval Corpus Christi procession depicted in a French breviary of 1481, now in the Bibliothèque Municipale of Besançon

== Historical background and author ==
The play was written circa 1491. It is believed that the play was performed by an East Anglian touring company.

The original author is unknown, however it is believed that he was a member of clergy, as he has great knowledge of Scripture, The Mass, and The Office.

== The surviving manuscript ==
A singular manuscript of the play is the only surviving text available. The manuscript is found in 338r–356r of Dublin, Trinity MS F.4.20, catalogue no. 652. The initials "R.C" are located on the bottom right corner of the text. Gail Gibson hypothesizes that these initials belong to a vicar by the name of Robert Cooke, while Tamara Atkin argues that they belong to the printer Robert Copeland. Like the author, there is no way to definitively know what these initials really mean.

== Similarities to the Passion of Christ ==
The main plot points throughout the play correspond to the main plot points from the Passion. As Aristorius is Christian, his selling of the host symbolizes Judas betraying Christ. The host is nailed to a post, relating to Christ's crucifixion. The cauldron symbolizes Christ's burial, while the oven symbolizes Hell. The image of Christ revealed at the end represents the resurrection of Christ.

== Antisemitism controversy ==
The play is largely antisemitic, and Lisa Lampert views the play as a text that vilifies "the Jew" and casts them as a murderer and constant enemy of a Christian. She states that the play asserts that the Jews murdered Christ in the past, and will continue to do so in the future. Anthony Bale notes that while the play is largely antisemitic, viewing it as simply antisemitic would be a mistake. He asserts that the Jews are used to examine the aspects of religion, international trade, identity, and most importantly the efficacy of the Eucharist. He also asserts that the corrupt Christian (Aristorius) is presented as much at fault as the Jewish men who buy the host.

== Jews or Lollards? ==
There is an ongoing scholarly debate around whether or not the Jews in the play were actually meant to covertly depict members of the proto-Protestant Lollard movement. At the time that the play was written, the English Jewish community had been completely nonexistent for almost two centuries, since all Jews had been banished from England by King Edward Longshanks in the 1290 Edict of Expulsion. Celia Cutts accordingly believes that the real purpose of the play was to defend the Catholic doctrine of the Real Presence in the Blessed Sacrament against the attacks of the Lollards, and to persuade them away from their heresy. Others have alleged that East Anglia was very tolerant in the fifteenth century, as long as the nonconformists were both non-violent and discreet and presented no threat to the state. Furthermore, those who oppose this theory claim the lack of evidence of Lollardy during this time disproves it entirely.

== Characters ==
Vexillators – Men who give a summary of the play before it begins.
Jonathas – A Jewish merchant. Skeptical of the holy host, and aims to disprove it.
Aristorius – A Christian merchant. Flawed in his own ways, as he steals and sells Christ's body to Jonathas.
Episcopus – The Bishop.
Presbyter – A Priest named Isoder.
Clericus – A Clerk named Peter Paul. He is part of the deal to buy the host.
Jason – “The second Jew.”
Jasdon – “The third Jew.”
Masphat – “The fourth Jew.”
Malchus – “The fifth Jew.”
Magister Phisicus / Brundyche – A master physician, the "quack doctor".
Coll – A servant.

== Summary ==
The play begins with the Vexillators appearing to the audience with banners. They inform the audience of the plot. After the summary, the Vexillators ask that the audience never doubt Christ. They tell the audience that the play is set in Croxton, and then the play begins.

Aristorius appears, praising his success as a merchant, and thanking God for allowing him to sell his goods. Isoder enters, and says that he will do anything in his power to ensure that Aristorius remains successful. Jonathas then enters, thanking Mohammed for all that he possesses. Jonathas is a Jewish man who is skeptical of the Real Presence and Christianity. He, along with his friends Jason and Jasdon, have discuss how insane it is for Christian men to “believe on a cake” in their religion. The cake is referring to the holy host. They wish to desecrate a host in the name of their God, and discuss ways in which they can acquire one.

The Jewish men visit Aristorius, and ask him to sell the host. He initially refuses, as they are not of the Christian faith. Jonathas increases his offer to 100 pounds, which Aristorius is unable to turn down. Aristorius is afraid that he will get caught stealing the host, but Jonathas convinces him to do it at night time. Aristorius goes to visit his parish priest, and gets him drunk on wine – enabling him to steal the host.

Once they receive the consecrated host, Jonathas, Jason, Jasdon, Malchus, and Masphat decide to stab the host to see if it bleeds. To their surprise, it bleeds. Now terrified of the host, they decide to boil it in hot oil. When Jonathas tries to throw the host in the oil, it clings to his hand. He tries to wash it away in water, but again it stays attached. The men decide to pin it to a host, and pull Jonathas until he is released. The host is not removed, and the men wind up pulling so hard that his arm detaches from his body. Defeated, the men go to bed and vow to keep their plot a secret.

Coll and Brundich now enter. It is revealed that Brundich is a corrupt man, who makes his patients ill again to get the most money possible out of them. Coll tells Brundich of Jonathas’ troubles, and Brundich proceeds to attempt to treat him. Jonathas refuses this treatment, and tells Brundich to leave.

Jonathas has his men remove the host and toss it in the bubbling oil. The oil then turns to blood, and overflows. They then toss the host in a hot oven, where it begins to ooze blood and then eventually explode. After the explosion, an Image of Jesus Christ appears to the men.

Christ asks the Jewish men why they despise him so much. He proceeds to blame them for the desecration of his body both presently and in the past. Still, he says that he will forgive them. The men repent their sins, and Christ heals Jonathas’ arm when he dips it in the cauldron.

Upon confessing his sins to the Bishop, Jonathas brings the Bishop back to the image of Christ. The Bishop converts the image back into the Blessed Sacrament, and carried the Host back to the Cathedral. Aristorius confesses his sins, and asks forgiveness from the Bishop.

At the end of the play, all of the men attend a sermon at the church. The Jewish men convert, and proclaim belief in the Holy Trinity.The Bishop then asks for God's blessing, and chant in Ecclesiastical Latin, “Te Deum Laudamus” (We Praise Thee, O God) which ends the play.

== Performance history ==
A performance was staged at St. John's College Chapel in Oxford on 9 January 2013. On 13 March 2014 a recording of this performance was uploaded to Vimeo from the user Unmarked Films. The performance can be viewed at https://vimeo.com/89019417.

== Publishing history ==
Known publications of the play include:

- Play of the Sacrament: A Middle-English Drama, Edited from a Manuscript in the Library of Trinity College, Dublin, with a Preface and Glossary. Ed. Whitley Stokes. Publications of the Philological Society. Berlin: Asher, 1862.
- Manly, John Matthews, ed., Specimens of the Pre-Shakesperean Drama, with an Introduction, Notes, and a Glossary. 2 vols. Boston: Ginn & Company, 1897–98. 1:239–76.
- Waterhouse, Osborn, ed., Non-Cycle Mystery Plays, together with the Croxton Play of the Sacrament and The Pride of Life. EETS e.s. 104. London: Kegan Paul, Trench, Trübner & Co., 1909. Pp. 54–87.
- Adams, Joseph Quincy, ed., Chief Pre-Shakespearean Dramas: A Selection of Plays Illustrating the History of the English Drama from Its Origin down to Shakespeare. Boston: Houghton Mifflin, 1924. Pp. 243–62.
- Davis, Norman, ed., Non-Cycle Plays and Fragments. EETS s.s. 1. Oxford: Oxford University Press, 1970. Pp. 58–89.
- Coldewey, John C., ed., Early English Drama: An Anthology. New York: Garland Publishing, 1993. Pp. 274–305.
- Bevington, David, ed., Medieval Drama. Boston: Houghton Mifflin, 1975. Pp. 754–88.
- Walker, Greg, ed., Medieval Drama: An Anthology. Oxford: Blackwell, 2000. Pp. 213–33.
- Sebastian, John T. Croxton Play of the sacrament. Kalamazoo: Medieval Institute Publications, Western Michigan University, 2012.
