= St John the Baptist's Church, Papworth St Agnes =

Coordinates: 52.2639°N 0.1414°W

- St John the Baptist's Church, Papworth St Agnes, from the southeast

- Location in Cambridgeshire
- OS grid reference: TL 269 644
- Location: Papworth St Agnes, Cambridgeshire
- Country: England
- Denomination: Anglican
- Website: Friends of Friendless Churches

History
- Former name(s): St Peter's Church, Papworth St Agnes
- Dedication: John the Baptist

Architecture
- Functional status: Redundant
- Heritage designation: Grade II*
- Designated: 31 August 1962
- Architectural type: Church
- Style: Gothic Revival
- Groundbreaking: 1848
- Completed: 1854

Specifications
- Materials: Limestone and knapped flint fieldstone flushwork in a chequerboard pattern, tiled roofs

St John the Baptist's Church is a redundant Anglican church in the village of Papworth St Agnes, Cambridgeshire, England. It is recorded in the National Heritage List for England as a designated Grade II* listed building, and is under the care of the Friends of Friendless Churches.

== Early history ==
A church was present on the site at the date of the Domesday Survey in 1086, and it was replaced by a further church in 1530. By 1827 the chancel of this church had been demolished; at that time it consisted of a west tower and a nave in Perpendicular style. It was almost completely rebuilt in the middle of the 19th century, the tower in 1848 and the rest of the church between 1852 and 1854. The new church incorporated some items from the previous churches. It was designed by the rector at that time, Rev J. H. Sperling.

== Architecture ==
The church is constructed in alternating blocks of limestone and knapped flint fieldstone flushwork, forming a chequerboard pattern, and it has a tiled roof. Its plan consists of a four-bay nave with a north porch, a two-bay chancel with a north vestry, and a west tower. The bays are separated by five-stage buttresses. The tower is in three stages, with similar buttresses at the angles; it has an embattled parapet with gargoyles at the corners. All the windows are arched with three lights and tracery. Both the porch and the vestry are gabled. Items reused from former churches include a doorway dating from the 14th century, the tower arch of the 1530 church, and the gargoyles.

== Recent history and present day ==
During the 20th century the condition of the church deteriorated and by the 1970s it was largely derelict. It was declared redundant in 1976, deconsecrated, and a demolition order was granted. However, in 1979 it was taken into the care of the charity the Friends of Friendless Churches. The charity holds the freehold with effect from 5 December 1979. By the time it was taken over, tiles had been removed from the roofs, stained glass designed by William Wailes had been removed, and the font was in the churchyard. The organ dating from about 1860, designed by George Holdich, had also been removed. During the next few years money was raised for repair and restoration, and the Friends of Papworth St Agnes was founded. One surviving panel of stained glass was moved to the Stained Glass Museum at Ely Cathedral. As part of the restoration, modern lighting was installed, and a kitchen and toilets were added. Activities in the church were resumed in 2006, the font was returned to the interior of the church, and the stained glass window was also returned. The church is now used as a community centre, and services are occasionally held.
