= Graveley, Cambridgeshire =

Village in Cambridgeshire, England

Coordinates: 52.2645°N 0.1771°W

Graveley
- St Botolph's Church

- Location within Cambridgeshire
- Population: 223 (including Papworth St Agnes) 289 2011 census.
- OS grid reference: TL2464
- District: South Cambridgeshire
- Shire county: Cambridgeshire
- Region: East
- Country: England
- Sovereign state: United Kingdom
- Post town: St Neots
- Postcode district: PE19
- Dialling code: 01480
- Police: Cambridgeshire
- Fire: Cambridgeshire
- Ambulance: East of England

Graveley is a village and civil parish in the South Cambridgeshire district, in the county of Cambridgeshire, England. In 2001 the parish had a population of 223.

== History ==
The parish of Graveley covers an area of 1,582 acres (640 ha) at the western end of the historical county of Cambridgeshire. Until Huntingdonshire was merged into Cambridgeshire in 1974, its northern, western and southern borders were with Huntingdonshire parishes. Its eastern border follows a small stream that separates it from Papworth St Agnes.

In 1941, an area of 106 acres (43 ha) straddling the border with Offord Darcy was requisitioned by the government to form Graveley airfield and was used by bomber squadrons until the end of the Second World War. The part in Graveley included the end of the main runway and a number of buildings. The airfield closed in 1946 but reopened in the late 50s as a relief airstrip for Oakington barracks. The land returned to agricultural use in 1967.

Listed as Greflea in the 10th century and Gravelei in the Domesday Book of 1086, the name is believed to mean "woodland clearing by the pit or trench".

== Church ==
The parish church has been dedicated to St Botolph since at least the 14th century. The present building consists of a long chancel and a four-bay nave with north aisle, and a three-stage west tower. The present building largely dates from the 13th century, but fragments of a Norman building survive. The current tower dates from the 15th century. The chancel was rebuilt in the mid-18th century. Further restoration was performed in 1874 and again in 1888.

The church has been in the patronage of Jesus College, Cambridge, since 1558.

== Village life ==
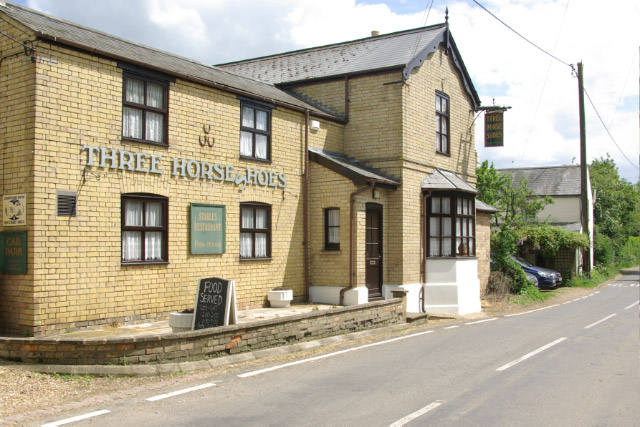
Three Horseshoes

The village has one public house, the Three Horseshoes, which opened in the early 20th century. Prior to that, The Chequers served the village from the 1760s until it burnt down in c1900. After the fire, The White Lion opened but it closed in c1920.

From the 18th century, the village had a schoolmaster and in 1872 a new schoolroom for 70 children was built. Numbers had fallen to 20 by 1900 and to fewer than 10 by the 1930s. Older children were moved to Croxton in 1948, and primary school children followed when the school finally closed in 1961.
