= Boxworth =

Village in Cambridgeshire, England

Coordinates: 52.25946°N 0.02637°W

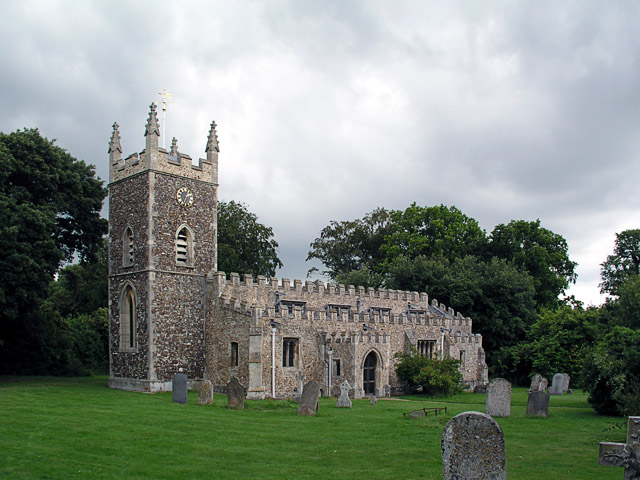
- St Peter's Church

- Location within Cambridgeshire
- Population: 218 (2011 Census)
- OS grid reference: TL348642
- District: South Cambridgeshire
- Shire county: Cambridgeshire
- Region: East
- Country: England
- Sovereign state: United Kingdom
- Post town: CAMBRIDGE
- Postcode district: CB23
- Dialling code: 01954
- Police: Cambridgeshire
- Fire: Cambridgeshire
- Ambulance: East of England
- UK Parliament: South Cambridgeshire

Boxworth is a village in South Cambridgeshire, situated about eight miles to the north-west of Cambridge. It falls under the Papworth Everard and Caxton ward and lies within the diocese of Ely. The village covers an area of 1,053 ha. (2,602 a.) Boxworth is a relatively small village, with around 100 houses.

== History ==
The place-name 'Boxworth' is first attested in the Domesday Book of 1086, where it appears as Bochesuuorde. It appears as Bukeswrth in 1228 in the Feet of Fines. The name means 'Bucc's enclosure or homestead'.

In the 1664 Hearth Tax, a large house belonging to a gentleman, Mr Killingworth, accounted for eight hearths at Boxworth.

Boxworth's population, once considerable, shrank severely after the Middle Ages before recovering to reach a peak of c. 350 in the mid-19th century.

In 1870–1872, John Marius Wilson's Imperial Gazetteer of England and Wales described Boxworth thus:

"BOXWORTH, a parish in the district of St. Ives and county of Cambridge; 3 miles WSW of Long-Stanton r. station, and 5 SSE of St. Ives. Post Town, Long-Stanton, under Cambridge. Acres, 2,521. Real property, £2,946 Pop., 347. Houses, 64. The property is divided among a few. The living is a rectory in the diocese of Ely. Value, £459.* Patron, G. Thornhill, Esq. The church has a monument of Sanderson, the blind professor of mathematics; and is good."

== Village life ==
Boxworth today has one public house, the Golden Ball.

== Church ==
Recorded from the mid-12th century, when relics of St. 'Inicius' were said to be deposited there, the church of St Peter is an ancient edifice of flint and stone in the Decorated style, consisting of a chancel, a nave of four bays, a south aisle, north and south porches and a lofty, embattled tower containing a clock and one bell: in the church is a monument to Nicholas Saunderson LLD, FRS, the celebrated blind professor of mathematics at the University of Cambridge, who died on 19 April 1739. Poet Mary Rolls' husband Henry Rolls served his curacy at Boxworth from 1813 to 1816. The church was thoroughly restored in 1868–9, and provides seating for 150 worshippers. There are some pictures and a description of the church at the Cambridgeshire Churches website.

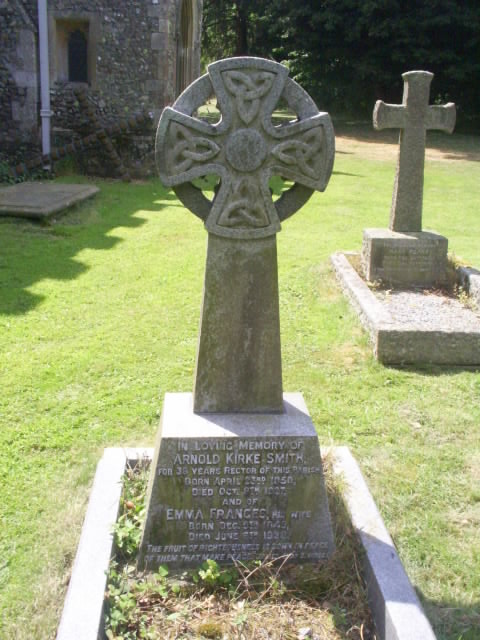
The grave of the Rev. Arnold Kirke Smith, who was vicar for 38 years until his death in 1927; he had in his early years been a notable footballer

== Road ==
The Road is designed to be a small access road to the rural outlying villages of Cambridge surrounding it, including Elsworth, Conington and Knapwell, and is usually quiet. However, as the village lies between two major roads – the A428 and the notorious A14 (previously A604) – it is occasionally used more heavily, especially when one of the major roads is blocked.

== Development ==
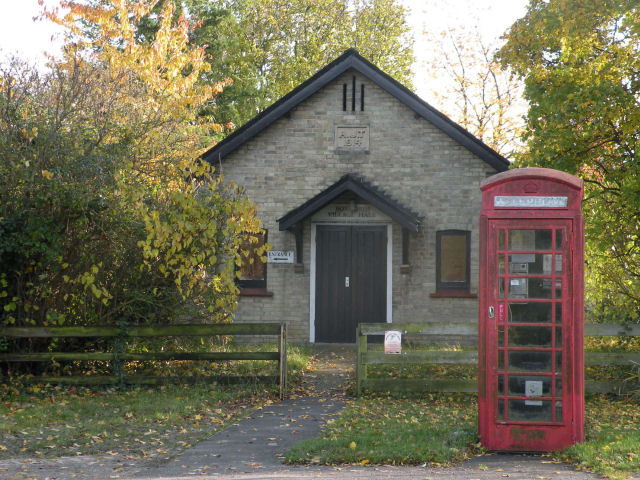
The village hall

Between 2003 and 2005, plans were drawn up to build a wind farm on arable land in the north of Boxworth. A total of 16 turbines were planned, and a number of residents of the village started a campaign called "Stop Cambridge Wind Farm", with the aim of blocking the windfarm's construction. In early 2005 the application was rejected by Cambridgeshire County Council, and a subsequent appeal was also rejected.

== Record temperature ==
The highest temperature ever recorded in Boxworth was 35.2 °C (95.4 °F), on 1 August 1995.
