= Papworth St Agnes =

Village in Cambridgeshire, England

Coordinates: 52.2641°N 0.1432°W

- Location within Cambridgeshire
- OS grid reference: TL268645
- District: South Cambridgeshire
- Shire county: Cambridgeshire
- Region: East
- Country: England
- Sovereign state: United Kingdom
- Post town: Cambridge
- Postcode district: CB23
- Dialling code: 01480
- Police: Cambridgeshire
- Fire: Cambridgeshire
- Ambulance: East of England

Papworth St Agnes is a village and civil parish in South Cambridgeshire, England. The population of the village is included in the civil parish of Graveley. It has also been known as Papworth Magna to distinguish it from the adjoining Papworth Everard and Papworth Parva. The name of the village does not come from any church of St Agnes but from a certain Agnes de Papewurda, c1160.

== History ==
The original village can be traced in the settlement remains between existing cottages and the manor house.

In the reign of King John the manor of Russells belonged to a family of that name, from whom it passed successively to the families of Papworth and Mallory. Much of the current building, formerly known as Manor Farm, was built for William Mallory in 1585. A Thomas Mallory, who according to one theory was the Sir Thomas Malory who wrote Le Morte d'Arthur, died in Papworth St Agnes in the 15th century.

Sometime before 1637 William Mallory's grandson sold Manor Farm to the Caters. There was a bell in the church bearing the name of Thomas Cater.

A moat and various earthworks surround the manor but have been disrupted by the road running through the village. (A detailed description of the manor building and the earthworks is to be found in An Inventory of Historical monuments in the County of Cambridgeshire, Volume one.)

St John the Baptist's Church, which was mentioned in Domesday Book (1086), was rebuilt in 1530 under the will of Anthony Mallory and rebuilt again in 1848 and 1854. In 1976 the Church Commissioners declared the church to be redundant and in 1979 proposed to demolish the building. The villagers petitioned against it and proposed to take over the upkeep of the building. With the help of the Friends of Friendless Churches and a great deal of fundraising, the building has been restored and is used for a variety of village activities.

The Rectory, now alienated, is a two-storey building built of white brick for the Rev. HJ Sperling in 1847–8 by a builder called John Bland. The cost was £497 exclusive of timber, which was supplied by the estate.

The School House, now a dwelling, has rendered walls and a tiled roof. Its south end is towards the church and is said to date from 1840.

The communal bakehouse, standing on a small village green, dates from 1850. It has an industrial chimney and was also used for scalding pigs. It is occasionally open for viewing as part of the annual Heritage Day events.

Passhouse Farm – now Passhouse Farmhouse – dates from the 17th century. It is an L-shaped framed and plastered building with a thatched roof and has been much altered over the years. It backs onto the meadows, an area of special natural history interest currently maintained under a scheme of Stewardship. Aerial maps of the village show ridge-and-furrow remains of both open-field furlongs and old closes in the meadows. These are also visible around Dumptilow Farm, Lattenbury Hill and north of the Manor.

Dumptilow Farm dates from the mid-19th century and Hill Farm was built around 1800. Both are built of white brick.

The soil is heavy clay with a subsoil of blue gault. The chief crops are wheat, oats, barley, rape and beans.

Four other thatched cottages remain: one at the north end of the village opposite the bakehouse (Manor Cottage) and three at the south end of the village. Between them is a group of modern houses built during the last 30 years.

The Old Reading Room was knocked down in 2000 and a new two-bedroomed cottage (The Reading Rooms) built in its place. Next to it stands a traditional and still-functioning red telephone box, although every house in the village is connected to the telephone network.

The population of the village in 1921 was 116 but by 1951 it had shrunk to 90. By the 1960s the village had decayed to a collection of 19th-century cottages interspersed with derelict closes. The population fell to a low point of 40 in the mid-1970s and is currently around 50. Since the 1970s there has been some development in the form of individual private detached houses and some cottages have been restored.

Papworth St Agnes used to be part of the Papworth Hundred, which included the villages of Boxworth, Conington, Elsworth, Fen Drayton, Graveley, Knapwell, Over, Papworth St Agnes, Papworth Everard, Swavesey and Willingham.

Sources:

1. Royal Commission on Historical Monuments, England (1968). An Inventory of Historical Monuments in the County of Cambridgeshire, Volume One, West Cambridgeshire

2. South Cambridgeshire Local Plan 1999

== Geography ==
The whole parish lies in an area of Best Landscape, with three sites of Natural History interest,

Ermine St Wood (Grid Ref:271654), Lattenbury Hill Wood (Grid Ref: 268660), Meadows (Grid Ref: 268645). The area is 1,298 acres (5.25 km^{2}). It used to extend to 1,316 acres (5.33 km^{2}) but 18 of them were lost to Papworth Everard during modern boundary adjustments, which came into operation on 8 October 1904.

Until 1895 some 586 acres (2.37 km^{2}) in the N.E. lay in Huntingdonshire and the rest in Cambridgeshire, with the boundary running between the chimneys of the Manor.

The B1040 on the south-east is part of the county boundary on the south to the Nill Well, where it follows the stream north to the Graveley road and further north to the former county boundary of Huntingdonshire.

On the east, Ermine Street (A1198) separates Papworth St Agnes from Hemingford Abbots and Hilton.

Nill Well is notable because it is a chalybeate spring, meaning the water is impregnated with iron salts

The meadows between the brook and to the west of the houses are a conservation area, which includes a site of Natural History Interest.

== The Bake House ==
One of the most interesting features of the village is the old bread oven, which sits on the triangular green where the road splits off to the church and rectory in one direction and past the old cart pond and Passhouse Farmhouse in the other.

Built of white bricks with a slate roof, it occupies a central position in the village. The pump for the village supply of washing water was beside the back wall of the bakehouse. To this day there is a small post-box in the side wall facing Manor Cottage.

According to Dora Tack in her book 'Whispering Elms' about the village, "In the past, this Bakehouse had been used to bake bread and pies for the occupants of the cottages in the village.

There was a large cast iron, brick surrounded copper to the left of a large oven. It had a very tall chimney (it had been shortened since) – possibly to lift the smoke and sparks high above the nearby thatched cottages. Ted Webb had provided a notice-board, and there was a seat beside the pump.

It was built in 1815 and was used to bake bread for the village. Certain houses or cottages were allocated a day on which the baking of their bread took place. Thus everybody had a turn to use the oven and copper if needed."
