= Elsworth =

Village in Cambridgeshire, England

Coordinates: 52.2540°N 0.0750°W

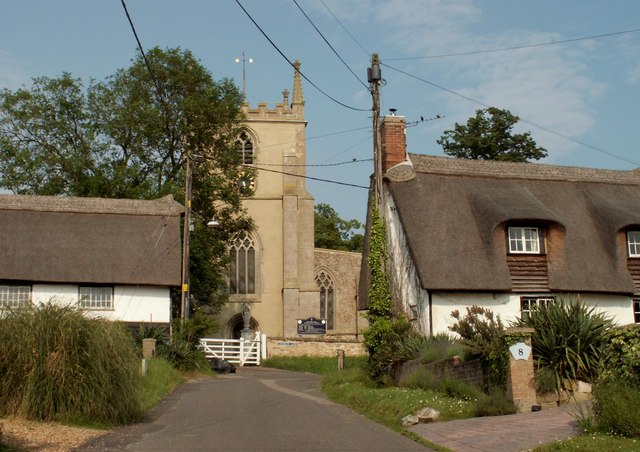
- Holy Trinity church

- Location within Cambridgeshire
- Population: 657; 726 (2011 census)
- OS grid reference: TL3163
- Civil parish: Elsworth
- District: South Cambridgeshire
- Shire county: Cambridgeshire
- Region: East
- Country: England
- Sovereign state: United Kingdom
- Post town: Cambridge
- Postcode district: CB23
- Dialling code: 01954
- Police: Cambridgeshire
- Fire: Cambridgeshire
- Ambulance: East of England

Elsworth is a village and civil parish in South Cambridgeshire, England, 9 miles northwest of Cambridge and 7 miles southeast of Huntingdon. At the 2011 census, the population was 726.

It was one of only two sites in Cambridgeshire to be covered by the Survey of English Dialects.

== History ==
The parish of Elsworth covers an area of 1,554 hectares to the north of the Cambridge to St Neots road. Its north-west border formed the border between Cambridgeshire and Huntingdonshire from the start of the 11th century until the two were merged in 1974. Its eastern border joins to the parish of Knapwell, formerly a dependent vill. At the end of the 13th century the parish also contained a hamlet called Grave, but this was not recorded as inhabited after 1349.

Elsworth was, during medieval times, one of the most populous villages in the neighbourhood. The Domesday Book of 1086 recorded 44 peasant households in the village; by the time of the poll tax in 1377, this number had risen to 209. Numbers subsequently declined before rising again to around 500 people in the 17th century. The population grew more rapidly from the 1760s before reaching an all-time peak of 878 in 1841. Around 50 people emigrated to Australia and the United States in the 1850s.

Listed as Eleswurth in 974, and Elesuuorde in the Domesday Book, the name Elsworth means "Enclosure of a man called Eli".

== Church ==
Elsworth has had a church under the patronage of Ramsey Abbey since at least the start of the 11th century. The present parish church of the Holy Trinity was built on the site of its predecessors in the 13th or 14th century, and the chancel and west tower date from this period. The tower contains four bells, three of which date from the 17th century.

The chancel contains some noted Perpendicular wooden stalls. Above the porch door is a sundial bearing the inscription "MOX NOX", and on the east gable is an attractive decorated cross.

== Village life ==
Elsworth has a primary school and pre-school, as well as a Grass Close, a business park and a Post Office/shop. The Elsworth Sports Club Pavilion is run by local volunteers and acts as the village hall and social hub. The pavilion is available to hire for private events, as well as hosting meetings of village organisations such as the Parish Council, Women's Institute and Elsworth Jubilee Club.

There are two remaining pubs in the village. The George and Dragon at Cowdell End opened in the first half of the 19th century and was rebuilt after an 1880 fire. A restaurant was added in 1975. The Poacher – known as The Fox and Hounds until the late 20th century – has been open since the 18th century.

Elsworth has had recorded alehouses since at least the 14th century. By the late 18th century five were recorded, including the Fox and Hounds, the Plough, which closed in 1961, and the Three Horseshoes, which closed around 1915.

Elsworth also has a community shop, run by volunteers from the village, which sells a range of groceries, cards and other items. The village also has a bi-monthly newsletter, the Elsworth Times, and a biannual magazine, the Elsworth Chronicle.

The village has a cricket team which plays league and social cricket. The Saturday XI plays in the Cambridgeshire and Huntingdonshire Premier League CCA Junior League 4 West.

Elsworth also stages a village show each September on the Grass Close. The show features competitions in many traditional categories such as baking and preserve making, as well as photography, art and other activities. The 2025 show will be the village's 67th annual show.

== Notable people ==
The former Conservative Party Member of Parliament for South Cambridgeshire and former Interim Leader of the Change UK party, Heidi Allen, has lived in Elsworth with her husband since 2017. She joined the Liberal Democratic Party before later announcing that she would not stand again for Parliament at the election in December 2019.

Rev W Awdry (b. 15 June 1911, d. 21 March 1997) was the vicar of Elsworth church between 1946 and 1950. He is best known for writing the Railway Series of children's books, of which Thomas the Tank Engine is the best known.
