= Croxton, Cambridgeshire =

Village in Cambridgeshire, England

Coordinates: 52.22416°N 0.18021°W

Croxton
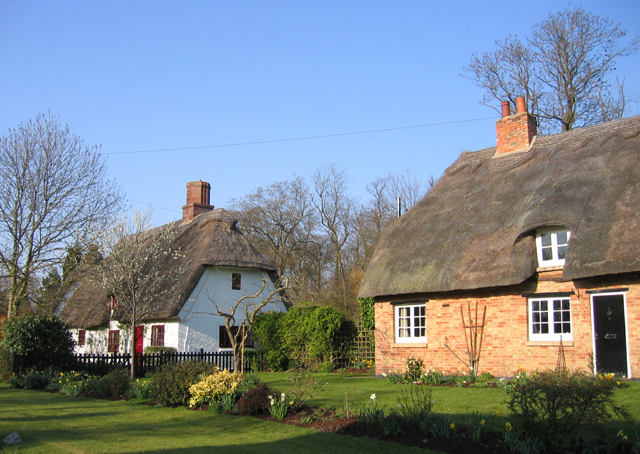
- Croxton High Street

- Location within Cambridgeshire
- Population: 160 (2011)
- OS grid reference: TL244600
- Civil parish: Croxton
- District: South Cambridgeshire
- Shire county: Cambridgeshire
- Region: East
- Country: England
- Sovereign state: United Kingdom
- Post town: ST NEOTS
- Postcode district: PE19
- Dialling code: 01480
- Police: Cambridgeshire
- Fire: Cambridgeshire
- Ambulance: East of England
- UK Parliament: South Cambridgeshire

Croxton is a village and civil parish about 13 miles (21 km) west of Cambridge in South Cambridgeshire, England. In 2001, the resident population was 163 people, falling slightly to 160 at the 2011 Census. Croxton Park is to the south of the current village and contains a large house and parkland.

== History ==
The name of the village was spelled Crochestone in the 1086 Domesday Book. 'Croxton' is derived from 'farmstead in a nook, or of a man called Krókr', or the Old English 'croh-tun' meaning saffron farm, and may have been part of a late Scandinavian settlement, along with Caxton and Toft.

It is likely that the settlement grew up on two sites: around the old manor house of Westbury, at the south end of the village, and around the old manor house of Croxton. It seems that a street to the east of the church formed the main village. By 1811 it had already reduced in size, and after enclosure in 1818, the rectory was demolished and an ornamental lake created on its site. By 1826, all the houses had gone and only Croxton Park mansion remained.

At Westbury, the green at the north end of the village street was enclosed and a large house, The Downs, and a farm were built on it. At the south end of the street is a late medieval timber-framed house called Croxton Manor but it was probably the original Westbury manor house. Westbury Farm was probably an earlier site for the manor house - the farmhouse has several medieval parts and remains of a moat.

In 1801, 171 people lived in Croxton parish; in 1821, 225 people. The population grew, though it declined between 1841 and 1851, when the mansion was unoccupied and there was emigration overseas from the area. Croxton's population peaked at 308 in 1871; in 1961 it was 155.

== Governance ==
The parish is represented on the South Cambridgeshire District Council by three councillors for the Bourn ward and on Cambridgeshire County Council by one councillor for the Papworth and Swavesey electoral division. It is represented at the House of Commons as part of the South Cambridgeshire constituency.

== Geography ==
Croxton parish covers an area of 7.72 km^{2} and lies alongside the A428 road between Bedford and Cambridge, the main village street being at right-angles to the major road. It is 13 miles (21 km) west of the county town of Cambridge and 49 miles (79 km) north of London. The nearest town is St Neots, 3.5 miles (5.6 km) west; minor roads run north to Toseland and south towards Abbotsley. The village sits to the North of Croxton Park, a Grade II* listed landscaped parkland with woodland and a lake.

The soil in the parish is clay with a gault subsoil. The parish ranges from 29 to 64 metres above sea level.

== Demography ==
At the time of the 2001 census, the population of Croxton parish was 163 people. All residents were white, 76.4% described themselves as Christian, three followed another religion and 21.8% either had no religion or did not state one. In 1921, the population was 234.

== Landmarks ==
A war memorial, commemorating Croxton men who died in the First and Second World Wars, was erected in 1920 in the churchyard. A total of 13 structures in the parish are listed, including a milestone by the A428, a cross in the churchyard, a 19th-century village pump and several cottages.

Within Croxton Park is a large Grade II* listed Country House, also called Croxton Park. It was the historic seat of the Leeds family. The current red brick, three-storey house was constructed around 1760–1 by Edward Leeds and probably incorporated part of the previous Tudor building. Sir (George) Douglas Cochrane Newton, Member of Parliament for Cambridge (and later 1st Baron Eltisley) was lord of the manor and principal landowner in 1929.

== Religious sites ==
A church at Croxton was first mentioned around 1217 and parts of today's church date from the 13th century. It is dedicated to St. James and situated south of Croxton Park, close to the manor house. It was built mainly of fieldstones in the Perpendicular style; the tower has a clock and six bells. The church is a Grade II* listed building. There are some pictures and a description of the church at the Cambridgeshire Churches website.

== See also ==
- List of places in Cambridgeshire
- Croxton Play of the Sacrament
