= Knapwell =

Village in Cambridgeshire, England

Coordinates: 52.25°N 0.05°W

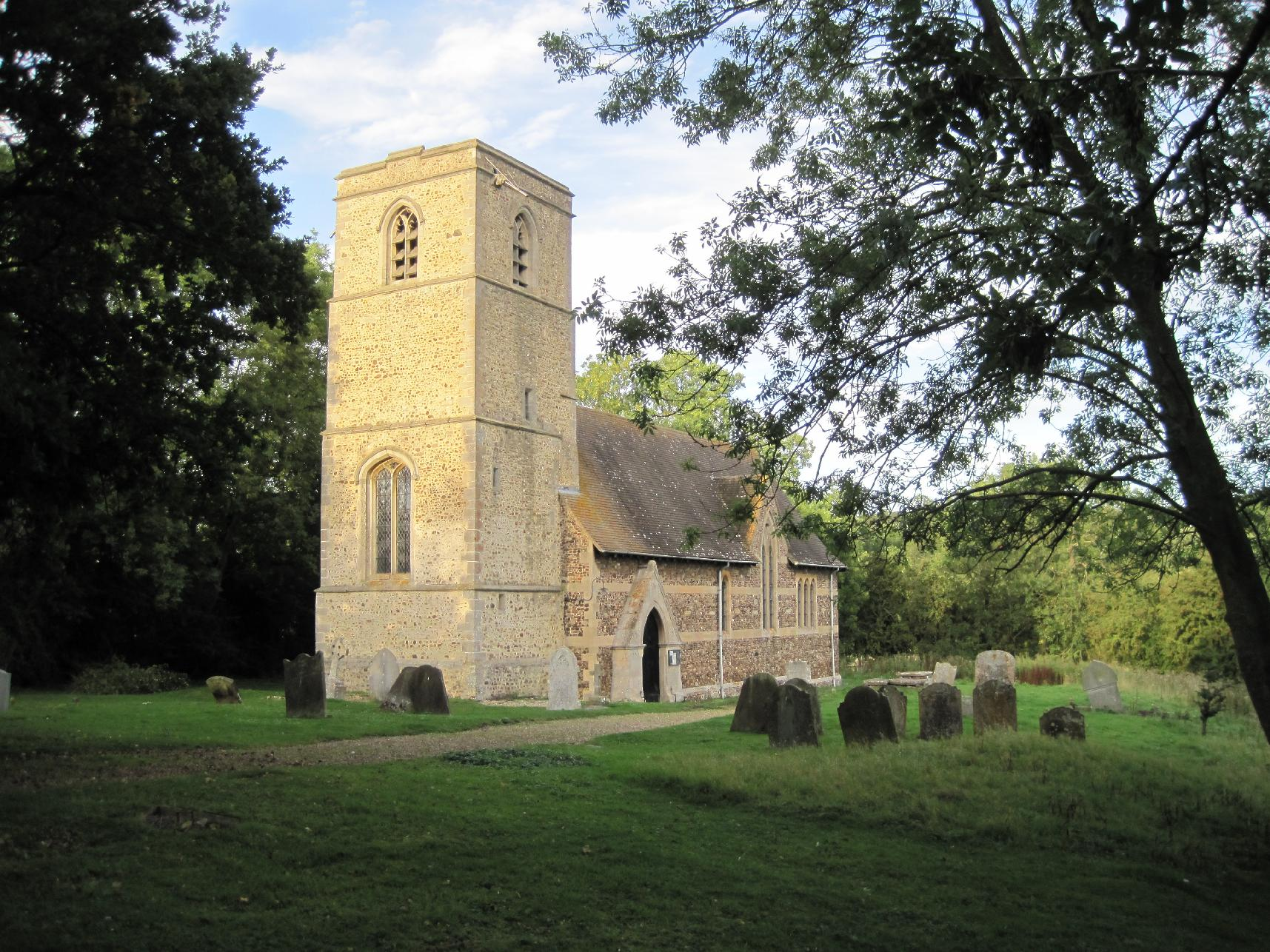
- Knapwell, All Saints

- Location within Cambridgeshire
- Population: 110 (2001 estimate)
- OS grid reference: TL331631
- Shire county: Cambridgeshire
- Region: East
- Country: England
- Sovereign state: United Kingdom
- Post town: Cambridge
- Postcode district: CB23
- Dialling code: 01954

Knapwell is a village in Cambridgeshire situated about 10 miles (16 km) west of Cambridge. It is within the diocese of Ely. Its population was estimated at 110 in 2001. At the 2011 census the population had fallen to fewer than 100.

Nearby villages include Boxworth, Conington, Elsworth and the expanding new settlement of Cambourne.

== History ==
The place-name 'Knapwell' is first attested in an Anglo-Saxon will of 1043–5, where it appears as Cnapwelle. It was referred to as Cnapenwelle in 1060, and was listed as Chenepewelle in the Domesday Book of 1086, when it was held by the Abbot of Ramsey. The name means 'Cnapa's well or stream'. 'Cnapa' may be the Old English cnapa meaning boy or servant, so the name might mean 'boy's well'. It seems likely that Knapwell is named after the chalybeate Red Well in the wood just to the east of the village. The well was the only source of water for both the village and neighbouring Boxworth. Its waters were known for their medicinal properties.

A mound to the north-east of the church is believed to be the motte of a Norman motte-and-bailey castle. It would have been a small fortification, probably with a timber superstructure, and perhaps dating from The Anarchy under King Stephen.

The village's manor house was established in Norman times, between the church and the motte, and traces of a building and moat remain in the wood (Overhall Grove) to the east of the church.

== Church ==
The village has had a church, dating back to at least 1180. A church, dedicated to All Saints, was probably built in the early 14th century. The medieval church had a long, low chancel and a three-bay aisled nave, all under a single roof, and a west tower. In 1864 the medieval church was demolished, except for the tower, and rebuilt in a plain Gothic style. The original 14th-century tower is built of field stones dressed with limestone and is unbuttressed.

== The Knapwell elm trees ==
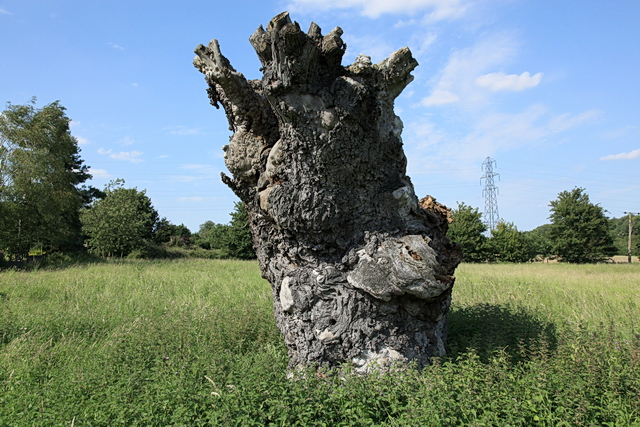
Remains of old pollard tree in Knapwell, once known for a group of pollarded field elms known as "the Dodds"

Knapwell was once celebrated for its many ancient pollarded field elms, which marked the old boundaries, closes and lanes of the larger medieval village and which were locally called "the Dodds". The trees grew both in the fields immediately bordering the main street and amongst the houses of the modern village. The name may have derived from "dodderel", a dialect word for a pollard. The trees succumbed to Dutch elm disease in the 1980s.

Overhall Grove (not to be confused with Knapwell Wood) has a notably large number of surviving elm trees.

== Village life ==
The village has no shops or pubs, though was home to the Three Horseshoes pub until its closure in 1880.

The local primary school is Elsworth CE(A) Primary School in Elsworth.
