= Hardwick, Cambridgeshire =

Village in Cambridgeshire, England

Coordinates: 52.2133°N 0.01186°E

Hardwick
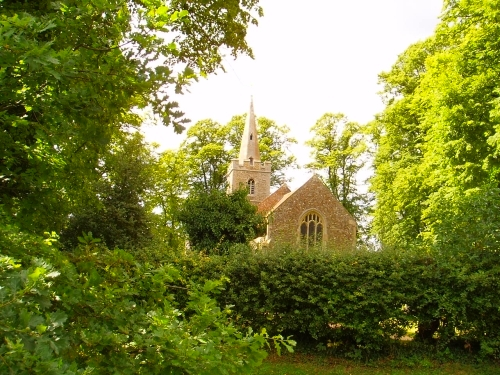
- St Mary's Church

- Location within Cambridgeshire
- Population: 2,670 (2011)
- OS grid reference: TL373587
- District: South Cambridgeshire
- Shire county: Cambridgeshire
- Region: East
- Country: England
- Sovereign state: United Kingdom
- Post town: CAMBRIDGE
- Postcode district: CB23
- Dialling code: 01954
- Police: Cambridgeshire
- Fire: Cambridgeshire
- Ambulance: East of England
- UK Parliament: South Cambridgeshire

Hardwick is a village and civil parish in the county of Cambridgeshire, England with a large housing estate located about 6 miles (9.7 km) west of the city of Cambridge, England. The village lies immediately south of the A428 road between Cambridge and St Neots. It is about 4 miles (6.4 km) east of the newly developed town of Cambourne. The village is nearly on the Greenwich Meridian. The northern border of the village is St Neots Road, now largely bypassed by the A428, with no houses or property on the north side of the road. In the 2001 census, the population was 2,630 in 946 households, increasing to 2,670 in 1,017 households at the 2011 Census.

Historically, the village of Hardwick is hundreds of years old with the first recorded mention in 991 AD and an entry in the Domesday Book of 1086. Hardwick used to consist of just a few houses and farmland around St Mary's Church, on what is now the southern edge of the village. There are two sites with original water pumps, one near the church and the other quite central just off Pump Lane. The village's bakery was sited next to a row of houses just to the east of the pub at the end closest to the church, and the only remnant is the shell of the building which has become a garage. In its very early years, Unipalm had an office in Broadway house, indirectly linking the village to the early history of commercial internet in the UK.

It has expanded greatly since the 1960s, mainly due to an estate of hundreds of houses built on the orchard land to the north of the original village, with the roads taking the names of the displaced trees (e.g. Ellison, Bramley, Limes, Pippin, Quince, Worcester...). Although significant building ceased, a number of new houses have been built over the years all over the village - wherever developers were able to acquire any plots of land; these are often the once large gardens of the earliest estate houses. The most recent significant developments are Meridian Close and the Grace Crescent.

The Blue Lion, the only pub in the village, lies on Main Street. The Sports and Social Club is based next to the football and cricket pitches in the centre of the village. The Scout and Guides have a hut near the Sports and Social Club. St. Mary's church built a church hall, called the Cabin, which opened in 2020.

Hardwick Community Primary School is the local pre- and primary school for children in Hardwick. Children of secondary school age usually go on to attend Comberton Village College, located in Comberton, southwest of Hardwick.

The village shop and post office are also on Cambridge Road. A beauticians nearby took over the site, after significant refurbishment, of another village shop which had failed and lain empty for some years.

The village has mains gas, sewage and water for most residents, though some off the main estate are not on mains gas.

Telephone and Internet service are provided using BT's infrastructure, focussed on the Madingley telephone (area code 01954), which is on the corner of Cambridge Road and St. Neots Road. PSTN and ADSL2/2+ services are provided by the exchange, and there are two FTTC (VDSL2/2+) cabinets. NTL/Virgin abandoned plans to fit cable TV about 1990 when their initial expansion plans ran out of cash, although they do have communication trunks running along St. Neots Road. The old parts of the village have their telephone and/or optical fibre internet delivered over poles, whilst the 70's part of the village has its telephone cabling buried, sometimes without ducting and no optical fibre available. The most recent parts have optical fibre in underground ducts. Cambridge Fibre are intending to offer Internet service and have been building infrastructure.

There are a number of local businesses at the edge, based on St Neots Road, in Newton House and Broadway House. In November 2006 part of Newton House burned down, destroying a takeaway food outlet and a Turkish restaurant, while the rest of the building has been left unoccupied pending reconstruction work. Broadway House is home to several businesses. The adjacent property was the Conservative Party headquarters for Cambridgeshire. Further west on St Neots Road a café, a beauty salon, a pet shop, gym, a car repair/maintenance garage, medical clinic and an agricultural machinery merchant can be found.

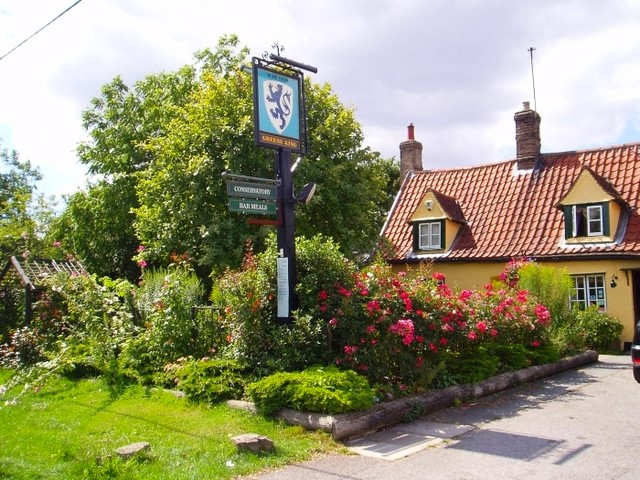
Blue Lion pub

In 2006 to 2007 the A428 was improved with a new section of dual carriageway, replacing the section of single carriageway, past Cambourne to Caxton Gibbet. Around the same time the postcode was changed from CB3 to CB23 for this sector.

== See also ==
Toft, Cambridgeshire which used to include Hardwick within its boundaries
