= Toft, Cambridgeshire =

Village in Cambridgeshire, England

Coordinates: 52.1866°N 0.0131°W

Toft
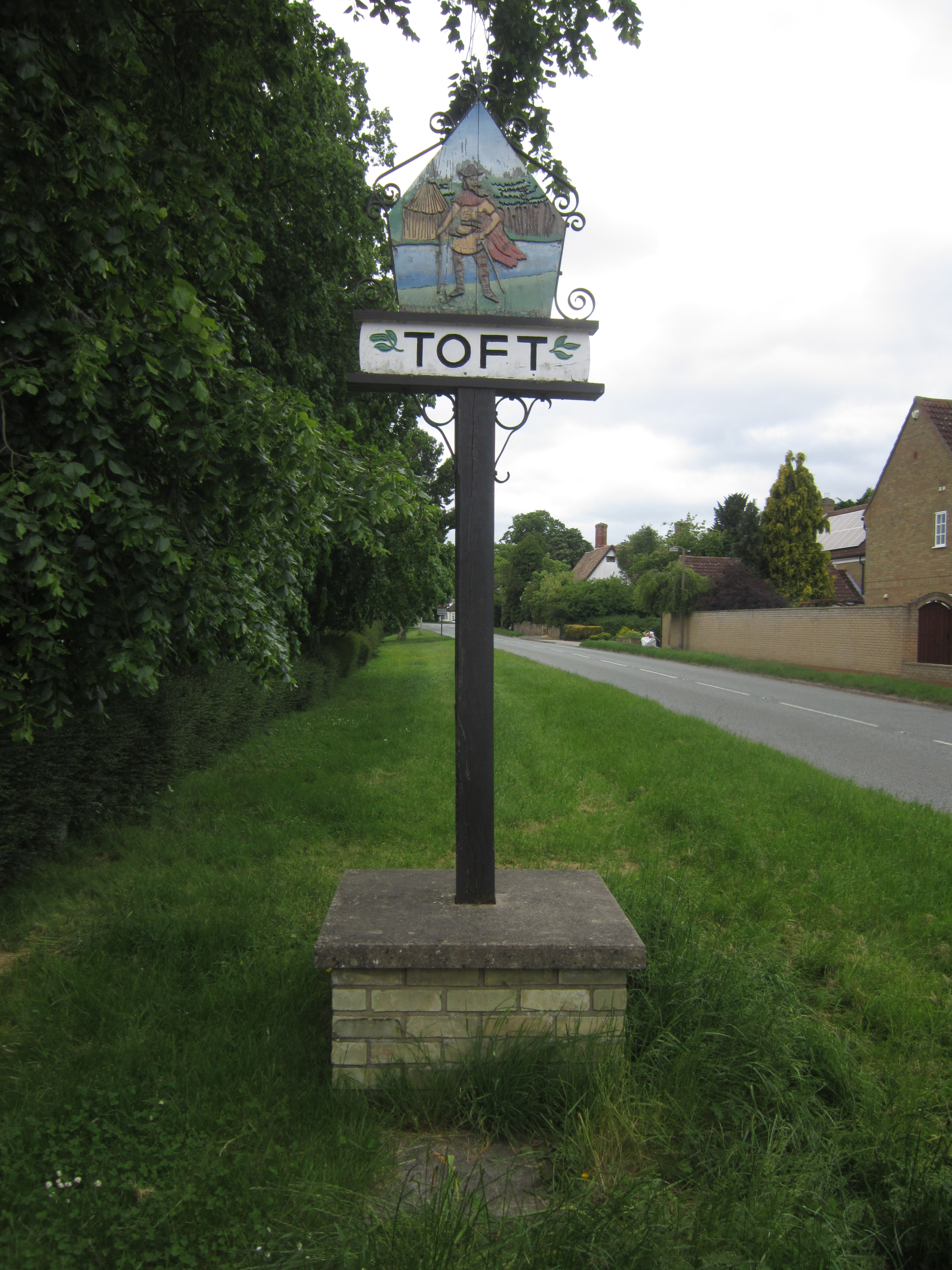
- Village sign at the entrance

- Location within Cambridgeshire
- Population: 503 (2011)
- OS grid reference: TL355557
- District: South Cambridgeshire
- Shire county: Cambridgeshire
- Region: East
- Country: England
- Sovereign state: United Kingdom
- Post town: Cambridge
- Postcode district: CB23
- Dialling code: 01223

Toft is a village situated in Cambridgeshire, England. It is approximately six miles to the west of Cambridge, and is situated within four miles of the M11 motorway. It has approximately 600 residents and 200 homes. Comberton Village College and Comberton Sixth Form fall within the Toft Parish boundary. The village has two churches, St Andrew's Parish Church and Toft Methodist Church. Just to the east of the village is Cambridge Meridian Golf Club, which has the Prime Meridian running through the 14th fairway. The name "Toft" is derived from an old Viking word meaning "curtilage" or "homestead".

== History ==
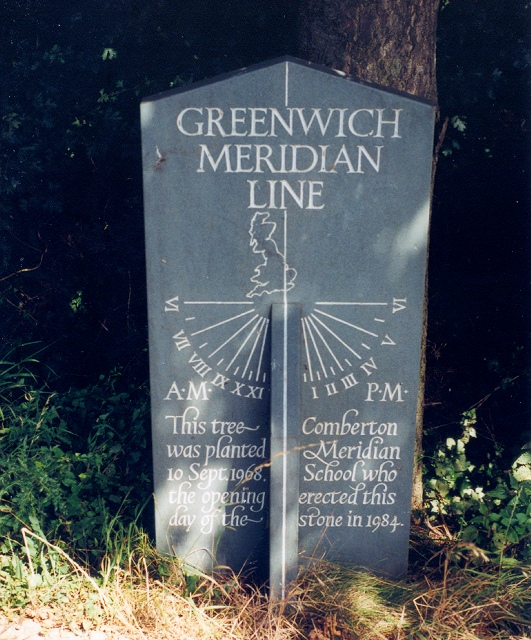
Meridian marker

The ancient parish of Toft consisted of 1,285 acres between the villages of Comberton to the east and Caldecote to the west. At the time of the Domesday Book in 1086, the parish extended up to the Cambridge–St Neots road, and thus included modern-day Hardwick until it became a separate parish in 1815.

The village probably sprang up during Saxon times, when the wooded area began to be cleared for farming. By the time of the Norman Conquest the lands were owned by the king, the Abbot of Ely and a woman named Eddeva. The Normans gave Eddeva's lands to Alan, Count of Brittany, who passed them to the manor of Swavesey. By 1109, the lands were all granted to the newly formed Bishopric of Ely.

Toft has 23 listed buildings of special architectural or historic interest. Among these is Toft Manor, formerly the Rectory, which was built in 1844 along with several cottages.

Toft is one of 54 Thankful Villages in England and Wales, where all those who served in World War One returned safely. The village is featured on Darren Hayman's album, Thankful Villages Volume 3.

== Church ==
The parish church has been dedicated to Saint Andrew since at least the 13th century and stands on the site of an earlier church. The present building contains some structure from the late 14th century but was largely rebuilt in 1863, apparently repeating the layout of the medieval church. The medieval tower was rebuilt in 1894.

In the 17th century, Toft became a centre of Puritanism. When the Archdeacon of Ely visited in 1685, he found that the church had been greatly neglected, with cracks in the walls and the building being used as a store for bricks and stones. The church was restored over the next few decades.

The church is in the patronage of Christ's College, Cambridge.

John Wesley is believed to have preached in a barn in the village, and in 1862 a Primitive Methodist chapel was built in the High Street.

== Village life ==
Toft contains a village shop (specialising in South African cuisine), a hairdresser's, a Chinese takeaway, a fish and chip shop, a social club and a florists. A post office first opened in the village in the 1870s as part of the village shop. A library was opened in 1913, but has since closed. At the end of the 19th century there were two pubs in the village, the Black Bull and the Red Lion, Both have since closed, and the latter now houses the Chinese restaurant. The Toft Historical Society holds regular exhibitions and is building a web-based archive of the history of the village.

The village had a football club, Toft Lions, who play in the CDFL Cambridgeshire men's league.
