= 1919 New Year Honours (OBE) =

Appointments of Officers of the Order of the British Empire in the 1919 New Year Honours

The 1919 New Year Honours were appointments by King George V to various orders and honours to reward and highlight good works by citizens of the British Empire. The appointments were published in The London Gazette and The Times in January 1919.

== Military Division ==
=== Royal Navy ===
- Engineer Lieutenant-Commander Henry Charles Anstey
- Lieutenant-Commander Harold Gordon Atkinson, Royal Naval Volunteer Reserve
- Lieutenant William Atkinson, Royal Naval Reserve
- Commander Arthur Douglas Barff
- Lieutenant John Holderness Bartlett, Royal Naval Reserve
- Surgeon Commander Richard Francis Bate
- Lieutenant-Commander Henry Baynham
- Paymaster Lieutenant Norman Hugh Beall
- Lieutenant Arthur Bean, Royal Naval Reserve
- Commander Edward Morden Bennett
- Paymaster Lieutenant-Commander Martin Gilbert Bennett
- Lieutenant Louis Charles Bernacchi, Royal Naval Volunteer Reserve
- Lieutenant Commander Frank Birch, Royal Naval Volunteer Reserve
- Commander Arthur George Hayes Bond
- Lieutenant Commander Charles Kirby Borissow, Royal Naval Reserve
- Lieutenant-Commander Gerald Percival Bowen
- Commander Duncan Tatton Brown
- Paymaster Lieutenant-Commander John Edward Ambrose Brown
- Commander Harold Ernest Browne
- Engineer Lieutenant John Robertson Buchan
- Paymaster Commander Wilfrid James Bull
- Commander Charles Thomas Alexander Bunbury
- Commander Arthur Stanley Burt
- Lieutenant-Colonel James Frederick Cable, Royal Marines
- Lieutenant Christopher George Carr, Royal Naval Reserve
- Commander James Thomas Walter Charles CB RD Royal Naval Reserve
- Engineer Commander James Sandford Constable
- Lieutenant Alexander James Cook, Royal Naval Reserve
- Paymaster Lieutenant-Commander Archibald Frederick Cooper
- Acting Lieutenant Frederick James Harold Corbyn, Royal Naval Reserve
- Commander William Henry Cottrell CMG Royal Naval Volunteer Reserve
- Lieutenant Herbert Spencer Cox, Royal Naval Reserve
- Lieutenant Commander Charles Henry Davey
- Lieutenant-Commander Roderick Wilson Day, Royal Naval Reserve
- Lieutenant-Commander Arthur Douglas Harry Dibben
- Engineer Commander Horace Edward Dowling
- Lieutenant Commander Edward Dumerque Drury, Royal Naval Reserve
- Lieutenant Robert Ewart Dunn, Royal Naval Reserve
- Lieutenant Thomas William John Dunning, Royal Naval Reserve
- Lieutenant Thomas Eachus, Royal Naval Volunteer Reserve
- Lieutenant Robert Edmond, Royal Naval Volunteer Reserve
- Lieutenant Herbert Denham Emery, Royal Naval Volunteer Reserve
- Paymaster Lieutenant William George Ewart Enright
- Engineer Commander James Risk Farish, Royal Naval Reserve
- Lieutenant-Commander John Phelips Farquharson
- Engineer Captain John William Figgins, R.N. HMS Glory
- Commander Thomas Roderick Fforde
- Paymaster Lieutenant Reginald Bertram Ford, Royal Naval Reserve
- Engineer Commander Benson Fletcher Freeman
- Captain Henry Vincent Fuller, Royal Marines
- Paymaster Lieutenant-Commander John William Edward Gilhespy
- Engineer Commander Andrew Gillespie, Royal Naval Reserve
- Lieutenant John Gillies, Royal Naval Volunteer Reserve
- Lieutenant William Glegg-Smith, Royal Naval Volunteer Reserve
- Lieutenant Norris Goddard, Royal Naval Volunteer Reserve Chaplain
- Reverend Christopher Graham
- Honorary Engineer Commander William Air Graham, Royal Naval Reserve
- Paymaster Lieutenant-Commander Charles Greenwood, Royal Naval Volunteer Reserve
- Commander George Gregory RD Royal Naval Reserve
- Commander Alfred William Gush
- Lieutenant Herbert James Hanson, Royal Naval Volunteer Reserve
- Surgeon Commander Robert Hardie
- Lieutenant Commander Edward George Godolphin Hastings
- Captain Gerald Fenwick Haszard DSC Royal Marine Artillery
- Paymaster Lieutenant-Commander Robert Haves
- Engineer Lieutenant-Commander Frederick Gambler Haynes RD Royal Naval Reserve
- Paymaster Lieutenant-Commander Charles Howard Heaton
- Lieutenant Thomas Mann Heddles, Royal Naval Reserve
- Engineer Commander Edward Owen Hefford
- Lieutenant Gerald Dudley Hill, Royal Naval Volunteer Reserve
- Lieutenant Stephen Leonard Hoare, Royal Naval Reserve
- Commander Berkeley Home-Sunnier
- Lieutenant Charles Frederick Horne, Royal Naval Reserve
- Lieutenant Henry Mowbray Howard, Royal Naval Volunteer Reserve
- Acting Schoolmaster Lieutenant Samuel Louis Hutchings
- Surgeon Lieutenant Arthur Ernest Iles FRCS
- Lieutenant-Commander Harold Isherwood, Royal Naval Volunteer Reserve
- Commander Harold Gordon Jackson
- Lieutenant Commander Thomas Norman Jenkinson, Royal Naval Volunteer Reserve
- Paymaster Lieutenant-Commander David T. Jones, Royal Naval Reserve
- Major Hubert Louis Jones, Royal Marine Light Infantry
- Engineer Commander John Kelly
- Lieutenant C. W. King, Royal Naval Volunteer Reserve
- Acting Paymaster Lieutenant Herbert Victor Lee, Royal Naval Reserve
- Engineer Commander Arthur Ellis Lester DSO
- Engineer Commander Andrew Graham Liston, Royal Naval Reserve
- Lieutenant-Commander Stephen Olive Lyttleton DSC
- Lieutenant Leander McCormick-Goodhart, Royal Naval Volunteer Reserve
- Lieutenant Commander Redmond Walter McGrath, Royal Naval Volunteer Reserve
- Lieutenant William MacPherson McRitchie, Royal Naval Reserve
- Commander Robert Henry Ramsay MacKay
- Lieutenant James Charles Newsome Macmillan
- Commander Frederick William Mace, Royal Naval Reserve
- Lieutenant John Martyn, Royal Naval Reserve
- Shipwright Lieutenant Commander James Ress May
- Paymaster Commander Grenville Acton Miller
- Lieutenant Joseph Alfred Minter
- Engineer Commander Albert John Campbell Moore
- Commander Hartley Russell Gwennap Moore
- Surgeon Lieutenant-Commander Leslie Miles Morris
- Acting Schoolmaster Lieutenant Richard Mountstephens
- Commander Edwin Mansergh Palmer
- Lieutenant Gladwyn Parry, Royal Naval Reserve
- Surgeon Commander Herbert Lloyd Penny
- Commander Herbert Mosley Perfect
- Engineer Lieutenant Cyril Harold Lee Pilditch
- Lieutenant John Maurice Barbes Pougnet, Royal Naval Reserve
- Engineer Commander Thomas Pierce Pover, Royal Naval Reserve
- Lieutenant William Alfred Price
- Paymaster Lieutenant-Commander Cunningham Prior
- Lieutenant John Osment Richards, Royal Naval Reserve
- Lieutenant-Commander Gerard Brook Riley
- Engineer-Commander Francis John Roskruge DSO
- Lieutenant William Mill Ruxton, Royal Naval Reserve
- Lieutenant Walter Thomas Ryan, Royal Naval Reserve
- Engineer Lieutenant John Sandieson
- Engineer Lieutenant James Alfred Seabrook
- Surgeon Commander Ernest Albert Shaw
- Paymaster Lieutenant-Commander John Siddals
- Major James Simpson, Royal Marine Light Infantry
- Major Charles Wynne Slaney, Royal Marine Light Infantry
- Lieutenant-Commander John Ambrose Slee
- Lieutenant Harold Nevil Smart CMG Royal Naval Volunteer Reserve
- Major Frederick H. Smith, Royal Marines
- Lieutenant-Commander Norman George Fowler Snelling, Royal Naval Volunteer Reserve
- Quartermaster and Honorary Major William George Sparrow, Royal Marine Artillery
- Commander Martyn Frederic Stapylton
- Acting Chaplain the Rev. Richard Swann Swann-Mason
- Quartermaster and Honorary Major William Symes, Royal Marine Light Infantry
- Lieutenant-Commander Reginald Molière Tabuteau
- Engineer Commander John Charles Talbot
- Lieutenant-Commander William Charles Tarrant, Royal Naval Reserve
- Honorary Commander John Howard Temple, Royal Naval Volunteer Reserve
- Lieutenant-Commander James Henry Thorn
- Commander Frank John Thring
- Lieutenant Henry William Cossart Tinker, Royal Naval Volunteer Reserve
- Lieutenant Reginald Brooks Townshend, Royal Naval Volunteer Reserve
- Paymaster Lieutenant John William Upham, Royal Naval Reserve
- Lieutenant-Commander Bertram Vigne
- Shipwright Lieutenant-Commander Charles Rogers Vincent
- Engineer Commander Charles James Mitchell Wallace
- Lieutenant Tacy Millett Winstanley Wallis, Royal Naval Volunteer Reserve
- Lieutenant-Commander Charles Bertram Ward, Royal Naval Reserve
- Lieutenant Alexander Watchlin, Royal Naval Reserve (New Zealand)
- Lieutenant William Robert Watson, Royal Naval Volunteer Reserve
- Commander Robert Lewis Way
- Commander Godfrey George Webster
- Commander Hans Thomas Fell White
- Commander Wallace Edgar Whittingham RD Royal Naval Reserve
- Lieutenant Charles Howard Windle, Royal Naval Volunteer Reserve
- Lieutenant Edward Charles Wrey
- Lieutenant Stanley Harris Young, Royal Naval Volunteer Reserve
- Lieutenant-Commander Thomas Wallace Young, Royal Naval Reserve

=== Army ===
- Major Alexander Cecil Adair, Royal Scots Fusiliers
- Major William David Allan, Royal Highlanders
- Temp Captain Roy Dunlop Anderson DSO Middlesex Regiment
- Honorary Lieutenant-Colonel Francis Havard Arnold, Royal Arony Ordnance Corps
- Controller Alice L. Atkinson, Queen Mary's Army Auxiliary Corps
- Captain Thomas John Day Atkinson, Unattd. List, and General List
- Temp Major Ralph Bagnall, Special List
- Temp Captain George Joseph Ball, Special List
- Major Harold Douglas Barnes TD 7th Battalion, London Regiment
- Lieutenant Walter William Beale, Welsh Horse Yeomanry
- Temp Lieutenant-Colonel Leonard Frank Beatson, Labour Corps
- Captain Morris James Bell, 9th Battalion, Highland Light Infantry
- Major Alexander John Munro Bennett TD Territorial Force Reserve
- Temp Major Cecil Bevis Bevis, Special List
- Brevet Colonel Maurice William Palmer Block, late Royal Artillery
- Major Arthur Reade Braid, late Royal Army Ordnance Corps
- Major Arthur John Breakey, late Royal Artillery
- Temp Captain Phillip John Broadley, late 11th Battalion, East Lancashire Regiment
- Lieutenant-Colonel Arlhui Roile Bryant, 4th (Res) Battalion, Essex Regiment
- Lieutenant Thomas Alfred Tovmsend Bucknill, Surrey Yeomanry
- Colonel William Henry Bull FRCS VD Army Medical Service
- Major Sydney Collard Burton, Special List
- Brevet Colonel Arthur Lewis Caldwell, late Royal Army Service Corps
- Quartermaster and Major Aquila Clapshaw, Royal Army Medical Corps (ret. pay)
- Lieutenant-Colonel Robert Joseph Cooke, late Cheshire Regiment
- Temp Lieutenant Francis Wellington Corbet, Special List
- Temp Lieutenant Peter Hood Cowan, Special List
- Major Joshua John Cox FRCS Royal Army Medical Corps Reserve
- Temp Major Cecil Reginald Dibben, Special List
- Captain William Swart Dittman, Royal Garrison Artillery
- Quartermaster and Major Charles John Dixon, Extra Regimentally Employed List
- Major Wilfred Chatterton Dumble, late Royal Engineers
- Lieutenant-Colonel William Arnold Eaton, East Kent Regiment
- Temp Major James Logan Ellis, Special List
- Quartermaster and Major Philip Ellis, late Royal Engineers
- Captain Maurice Woodman Emley, Royal Engineers
- Colonel Charles Ernest English, late Royal Artillery
- Captain Charles Edward Etches, Royal Warwickshire Regiment
- Captain Edward Leyland Cooke Feilden, late Highland Light Infantry
- Temp Lieutenant David Forrest, Special List
- Lieutenant-Colonel Sinclair Gair, 6th Battalion, Seaforth Highlanders
- Lieutenant-Colonel Frederick James Gavin, late Royal Irish Regiment
- Temp Captain Edward Christian Griffin, Royal Berkshire Regiment
- Lieutenant-Colonel Andrew Haddon VD late Unattached List
- Major John Cyril Giffard Alers Hankey MVO Royal Artillery
- Major William Richard Monyns Hartcup, Durham Light Infantry
- Deputy Chief Controller Winifred S. Haythorne, Queen Mary's Army Auxiliary Corps
- Brevet Colonel Arthur Beaumont Helyar, late Royal Artillery
- Quartermaster and Lieutenant-Colonel Joseph Thomas Higgins, Royal Army Service Corps
- Captain Henry Hincks MBE 3rd Battalion, York & Lancaster Regiment
- Controller Edith Marjory Hornblow, Queen Mary's Army Auxiliary Corps
- Bt Colonel Randall Charles Annesley Howe, 3rd Battalion, York & Lancaster Regiment
- Temp Lieutenant James Irvine, Special List
- Temp Lieutenant Maximilian Jackson, late 16th Battalion Nottinghamshire and Derbyshire Regiment
- Major Charles Maurice Jickling, 3rd Battalion, Norfolk Regiment
- Captain Raymond Johnson FRCS Royal Army Medical Corps
- Major Frederick Arthur Kelley, Royal Defence Corps
- Temp Major Hugh T. Ker MICE Royal Engineers
- Captain Francis John Lambert, 9th Battalion, Durham Light Infantry
- Lieutenant-Colonel John Irvine Lang-Hyde CMG late Royal Engineers
- Temp Lieutenant-Colonel Ernest Lascelles, Rifle Brigade
- Major Carteret de Mussenden Leathes, 5th Battalion, Royal Irish Rifles (Special Reserve)
- Captain George Lee-Evans, 21st Battalion, Manchester Regiment
- Temp Captain Fred Ball Ludlow MC 1st Battalion, Nottinghamshire and Derbyshire Regiment
- Temp Major Michael McGuire, Special List
- Lieutenant-Colonel John Robert Mallius late Royal Army Medical Corps
- Major Thomas Harris Manners-Howe, Royal Defence Corps
- Lieutenant-Colonel and Honorary Colonel Edward Lethbridge Marsack, late 5th Battalion, Duke of Cornwall's Light Infantry
- Major Henry Edmunds Mathews, 4th Battalion, Royal Sussex Regiment
- Temp Lieutenant-Colonel Oswald Llewellyn Mathias, Special List, late the Welsh Regiment
- Temp Captain Charles Stenteford Maxted, Special List
- Temp Major Gaston Mayer, Special List
- Temp Major Percy Douglas Michod, Royal Engineers
- Brevet Major Thomas Cecil Russell Moore, Royal Army Service Corps
- Temp Lieutenant James McVicar Munro, General List
- Temp Major John Steward Napier, Royal Army Service Corps
- Major Claud E. New, 3rd Battalion, East Surrey Regiment
- Temp Major Harry Kottingham Newton MP Royal Army Service Corps
- Lieutenant-Colonel Edward North, Royal Engineers
- Quartermaster and Major Charles Payne, Royal Engineers
- Major Oswald Henry Pedley, late Northumberland Fusiliers
- Lieutenant William David Pickin, General List
- Lieutenant-Colonel Evelyn Hay Pollock TD Royal Army Service Corps
- Captain The Honourable Ralph Legge Pomeroy, 5th Dragoon Guards
- Brevet Colonel Frank Romilly Reynolds, late Royal Engineers
- Brevet Lieutenant-Colonel Philip Wigham Richardson, Reserve
- Captain Graham Egerton Rickman, Royal Welsh Fusiliers
- Doctor Adeline Roberts, Queen Mary's Army Auxiliary Corps, Recruiting Medical Controller
- Temp Lieutenant William Rodick, Special List
- Captain Francis John Rodwell, 4th Battalion, Suffolk Regiment
- Captain John Edwin Rogerson, T.F. Reserve, General List
- Captain Henry Gordon Rowe, Royal Artillery
- Temp Honorary Major Isidore Salmon, General List
- Lieutenant-Colonel Victor Henry Sylvester Scratchley DSO late King's Royal Rifle Corps
- Quartermaster and Major John Shannon, Royal Irish Fusiliers
- Major Oswald Murton Short, Tyne Electrical Engineers
- Quartermaster and Major Thomas George Skeats, Extra Regimentally Employed List
- Major Richard Josiah Smyly, North Lancashire Regiment
- Quartermaster and Major Benjamin Smyth MVO Special List
- Temp Major Walter Field Soames, late Captain, Royal West Kent Regiment
- Brevet Major John Percy Somers, Reserve
- Captain Eustace John William Spread MC North Lancashire Regiment
- Captain Hedley Herbert Stacke, East Surrey Regiment
- Lieutenant-Colonel Sir Pieter Canzius van Blommestein Stewart-Bam, 7th Battalion, London Regiment
- Major Arthur Street, Royal Army Service Corps
- Brevet Colonel Charles John Willmer Tatharn, late Royal Army Medical Corps
- Captain Harold William Vazeille Tempedey, Fife and Forfar Yeomanry
- Quartermaster and Major Thomas Hastings Tennant, Royal Engineers
- Assistant Chief Controller Edith Thompson, Queen Mary's Army Auxiliary Corps
- Brevet Lieutenant-Colonel Harry Adair Thompson, late 3rd Dragoon Guards
- Deputy Chief Controller Jean Glass Thompson, Queen Mary's Army Auxiliary Corps
- Lieutenant-Colonel Edward Treffry CMG Honourable Artillery Company
- Major Henry Tristem, Royal Army Ordnance Corps
- Lieutenant-Colonel Henry Edward Vallentin DSO Royal Artillery
- Major Cliffe Henry Vigors, Royal Irish Regiment
- Captain James Glencorse Wakelin, 5th Battalion, Royal Scots Fusiliers
- Quartermaster and Major John Ward, late Royal Dublin Fusiliers
- Quartermaster and Lieutenant Cuthbert
- Philip Warner, late Royal Army Service Corps
- Lieutenant-Colonel Henry Wilson Weekes DSO Royal Engineers
- Major Charles Alexander Wheeler, Postal Section, Royal Engineers
- Captain John Sinclair White Royal Army Medical Corps
- Quartermaster and Major Sam Beck Wildman, Royal Army Service Corps
- Major John Maurice Wingfield DSO late Coldstream Guards
- Lieutenant-Colonel Charles Camden Wiseman-Clarke, late Royal Artillery
- Colonel Charles Knight Wood, late Royal Engineers
- Lieutenant-Colonel Evelyn Fitzgerald Michell Wood DSO Royal Garrison Artillery
- Colonel Frederick Augustus Yorke, late Royal Artillery
- Captain Albert Cecil Bussell, Attached to Mechanical Warfare Department, Ministry of Munitions
- Major Percival Charles Cannon, Inspector of Mechanical Transport Vehicles, Ministry of Munitions, U.S.A.
- Captain John Fleetwood Cumming, National Service Representative, Inverness Area
- Major Charles Sempill de Segundo VD Deputy Commissioner of Medical Services, Ministry of National Service
- Lieutenant John Campbell Gardner, Assistant Superintendent (Guns) at a National Factory, Ministry of Munitions
- Lieutenant-Colonel Montagu Francis Markham Sloane-Kittoe TD Section Director, Railway Materials Department, Ministry of Munitions
- Major Thomas Henry Lloyd, Chief Inspector, Munitions Recruiting Areas
- Captain Ernest Maclaghan Wedderburn Experimental Department, Ministry of Munitions
- Major Murray MacLeod, Inspector of Filled Fuzes, Directorate of Inspection of Gun Ammunition (Supervisory) Woolwich Arsenal
- Captain Henry Hartley Aloysius Russell, Assistant Director of National Service, Reading
- Captain Donald Boase Sinclair, Secretary, London and South-Eastern Region, Ministry of National Service
- Captain Edward Rawdon Smith, Assistant Secretary, Ministry of National Service
- Captain Reginald John Wallis-Jones, Section Director, Iron and Steel Production Department, Ministry of Munitions
- Lieutenant the Honourable Harold James Selborne Woodhouse, National Service Representative, Hammersmith

=== Overseas Military Forces of Canada ===
- Lieutenant-Colonel Frederick Walter Gale Anderson, Canadian Forestry Corps
- Major Thomas Richey Caldwell, 21st Battalion, Canadian Infantry
- Major Charles Vincent Campbell, Canadian Forestry Corps
- Lieutenant-Colonel George Hamilton Cassels, 2nd Central Ontario Regiment
- Major Alexander Don Cornett, Chaplain Canadian Forestry Corps
- Honorary Major Lawrence Adam Dowie, Canadian General List
- Major John Guerney Fordham, Canadian Railway Troops
- Major Austin Bain Gillies, Canadian Field Artillery
- Captain James Roberts Goodall, Canadian Army Medical Corps
- Major John Jeffery MC 13th Canadian Infantry Battalion
- Major James Hawkins Lindsay, Eastern Ontario Regiment
- Major Percy Crannell McGillivray, Canadian Army Service Corps
- Major William Geekie Morrison, Canadian Army Pay Corps
- Lieutenant-Colonel John Arthur Clark Mowbray, Canadian Army Pay Corps
- Lieutenant-Colonel Richard Raikes, Canadian Army Medical Corps
- Acting Lieutenant-Colonel Jason Rudolph Routh, Canadian Ordnance Corps
- Lieutenant-Colonel Albert Alexander Smith, Canadian Dental Corps
- Major John Eliot Swinburne, Canadian Forestry Corps
- Major Albert William Winnett, Canadian Army Dental Corps
- Lieutenant-Colonel Wolston Thomas Workman MC Canadian Chaplain Services

=== Australian Imperial Force ===
- Major Francis Teulon Beamish, Australian Army Medical Corps
- Lieutenant-Colonel Stephen Bruggy DSO Australian Imperial Force
- Major John Egbert Down, Australian Army Dental Corps
- Major Guy Sherington, General List
- Lieutenant-Colonel Bertram Milne Sutherland, Australian Army Medical Corps
- Major Walter Oswald Watt, Australian Flying Corps
- Major George Charles Willcocks MC Australian Army Medical Corps
- Lieutenant-Colonel Charleton Yeatman, Australian Army Medical Corps

=== Administrative Headquarters of New Zealand ===
- Major Percy de Bathe Brandon, New Zealand Army Pay Corps
- Major Andrew Seymour Brewis New Zealand Medical Corps
- Major William Bruce New Zealand Medical Corps
- Major Raymond Alexander Reid Lawry, Canterbury Regiment

=== Union of South Africa ===
- Temp Major Henry Percival Mills, 3rd Battalion, South African Infantry
- Temp Major Maurice Grey Pearson FRCS South African Medical Corps

=== For services rendered in connection with military operations in France and Flanders ===
- Temp Captain Josiah Logan Adams, Royal Engineers
- Captain Harold Cotterell Adams, Royal Army Medical Corps
- Major William Henry Adams, Royal Army Ordnance Corps
- Major Chilton Lind Addison-Smith, 3rd Seaforth Highlanders
- Lieutenant-Colonel William John Patrick Adye-Curran, Royal Army Medical Corps
- Lieutenant Norman Allan, Royal Army Service Corps
- Lieutenant William Allard, Royal Engineers
- Temp Captain Rupert Allcard, Royal Engineers
- Temp Captain Abraham Allen, General List
- Major Henry Chester Allin, Royal Army Service Corps
- Temp Captain John Goldwell Ambrose MC Royal Engineers
- Lieutenant Nevill Anderson MBE 5th London Regiment
- Temp Captain Alfred Anderson-Pelham, Royal Field Artillery
- Temp Captain John Stanley Arkle Royal Army Medical Corps
- Captain William Ascott, Royal Army Veterinary Corps
- Lieutenant Edward Atkin, Royal Garrison Artillery
- Temp Lieutenant Arthur Atkinson, Royal Engineers
- Major John Atkinson DSO Royal Army Service Corps
- Captain Harold Frederick Atter, 1/4th Yorkshire Light Infantry
- Captain Frank Baker, 5th Royal Welsh Fusiliers and Labour Corps
- Temp Major Nigel Barington Balfour, Royal Army Service Corps
- Temp Major Thomas Balston MC General List
- Major Maxwell Richard Crosbie, Viscount Bangor, late Royal Artillery
- Quartermaster and Major Thomas Barber TD 1st Hertfordshire Regiment
- Lieutenant Norman Leslie Barker, Royal Engineers
- Rev. Sydney Reeves Barnes, Royal Army Chaplains' Department
- Temp Captain Sydney Norman Barren MC Royal Engineers
- Lieutenant Geoffrey Selwyn Barrow, Royal Field Artillery
- Lieutenant-Colonel Harold Percy Waller Barrow CMG DSO Royal Army Medical Corps
- Lieutenant Edward George Bartlett MC King's Own Yorkshire Light Infantry
- Captain Charles Botterill Baxter FRCSE Royal Army Medical Corps
- Captain Robert William Beacham MC Northamptonshire Regiment
- Lieutenant Basil Perry Beale MC Royal Army Service Corps
- Temp Captain Horace Owen Compton Beasley, Labour Corps
- Captain William John Beckwith, Royal Army Ordnance Corps
- Temp Captain Arthur Beney, Royal Army Service Corps
- Major Thomas Edwin Bennett DSO Royal Army Service Corps
- Brevet Lieutenant-Colonel Christopher Robert Berkeley CMG DSO Welsh Regiment
- Temp Captain Reginald Edgar Besant, General List (late North Lancashire Regiment)
- Lieutenant Falconer Moffat Birks, Royal Army Service Corps
- Temp Lieutenant James Leatham Birley, Royal Army Medical Corps
- Temp Major John Blades, Royal Engineers
- Temp Captain Charles Frederick Blake, Royal Army Service Corps
- Major Henry d'Arnim Blumberg TD Royal Army Medical Corps
- Temp Lieutenant Stanley Abbott Bonner, Royal Engineers
- Temp Lieutenant Douglas Borden-Turner, General List
- Captain Johnathan Scott Bowden, Royal Army Veterinary Corps
- Lieutenant Arthur William Bowyer, 4th East Surrey Regiment
- Rev. Arthur Hamilton Boyd MC Royal Army Chaplains' Department
- Temp Captain James Maudsley Brander, Royal Army Service Corps
- Acting Captain Henry George Brayrooke, Royal Army Ordnance Corps
- Captain Frederick Rudolf Esmonde Dowes Brenan, Cambridgeshire Regiment
- Temp Lieutenant Charles Herbert Bressey, Royal Engineers
- Captain Arthur Edwin Briggs, Royal Army Service Corps
- Temp Captain Harold Neilson Brinson DSO Labour Corps
- Temp Lieutenant George S. Brown, General List (late York & Lancaster Regiment)
- Lieutenant Thomas Brown MC Welsh Horse Yeomanry
- Captain Frederick Julius Bull, Reserve (Middlesex Regiment)
- Lieutenant John James Bulman MC Royal Engineers
- Captain Launcelot Henry Beaumont Burlton MC Royal Army Service Corps
- Temp Captain Eric Francis Burn, General List
- Captain Harold Burrows FRCS Royal Army Medical Corps
- Captain Reginald Stevens Burt, General List
- Temp Major Arthur Burtenshaw MC Royal Army Service Corps
- Temp Major Percy Collingwood Burton, Special List
- Captain Arnold Charles Paul Butler, King's Royal Rifle Corps
- Temp Major Frank Norman Butler, Royal Engineers
- Captain Henry Basil Bacon Butler, Royal Army Service Corps
- Temp Captain Christopher Rawlinson Cadge, General List
- Major Edmond Leveson Calverley, Essex Regiment
- Temp 2nd Lieutenant Ernest Walter Camp, Labour Corps
- Temp Lieutenant Archibald Sydney Campbell, General List
- Temp Captain Cyril Cansdale, General List
- Captain William Philip Cantrell Cantrell-Hubbersty, 15th Hussars
- Captain Francis Julius Fay Carr, Scottish Rifles
- Major Lawrence Carr DSO Gordon Highlanders
- Temp Captain Edward Rogers Cartwright, Royal Engineers
- Temp Lieutenant Henry Slater Chaplin, Royal Army Ordnance Corps
- Temp Captain Guy Patterson Chapman, Royal Fusiliers
- Quartermaster and Captain John Damian Chapman, Royal Army Medical Corps
- Temp Captain Richard Charles FRCSI Royal Army Medical Corps
- Temp Captain Robert Chignell, Royal Army Service Corps
- Captain Armando Dumas-Child Royal Army Medical Corps
- Captain Sydney James Clegg, Royal Army Medical Corps
- Captain Clarence Beaufort Cockburn, Royal Army Service Corps
- Captain Arthur Francis St. Clair Collins, Royal Army Service Corps
- Temp Major Robert William Cooper MC General List
- Temp Lieutenant-Colonel William Linford Edward Cooper, General List
- Temp Lieutenant Edward James O'Cinidi Cordner, Royal Army Service Corps
- Major William Ernest Leslie Cotton MC Worcestershire Regiment
- Major Malcolm Coutts, Royal Army Service Corps
- Temp Captain Eric Tennant Cowan, General List
- Temp Captain Noel Anthony Coward Royal Army Medical Corps
- Brevet Lieutenant-Colonel John Evelyn Edmund Craster, Royal Engineers
- Temp Lieutenant Henry Aubrey Crowe, Royal Army Veterinary Corps
- Temp Lieutenant John Davidson, Royal Engineers
- Lieutenant Alexander Horace Davis MC Royal Garrison Artillery
- Captain William Henderson Davison, Royal Army Medical Corps
- Temp Captain Christian Richard John Day, Royal Army Service Corps
- Major Percy William Dayer-Smith, Royal Army Veterinary Corps
- Lieutenant Arthur Joseph de Carrara-Rivers, Royal Garrison Artillery
- Major Herbert Joseph Norman de Salis, Royal Engineers
- Temp Captain Rudolf Edgar de Trafford, General List
- Temp Captain Joseph Devlin, General List
- Temp Captain Frederick Thomas Dickerson, Labour Corps
- Temp Major William Stewart Dickie FRCS Royal Army Medical Corps
- Captain Harry Lionel Ffortington Dimmock, Royal Garrison Artillery
- Lieutenant-Colonel Thomas Dowling, Royal Army Service Corps
- Captain John Hughes Drake MC Hertfordshire Yeomanry
- Rev. George Simpson Duncan, Royal Army Chaplains' Department
- Captain Arthur Geoffrey Dunsterville, Argyll and Sutherland Highlanders
- Temp Major Frank Rogers Durham MC Royal Engineers
- Major Arthur Murray Duthie DSO Royal Field Artillery
- Lieutenant Reginald Percival Sidney Edden, 3rd Lancashire Fusiliers
- Temp Major Courtenay Harold Wish Edmonds, Royal Engineers
- Lieutenant-Colonel John Egginton TD Reserve and Labour Corps
- Brevet Major George William Ellis, Royal Army Medical Corps
- Temp Captain and Quartermaster Harry Launcelot Etherington-Smith, Royal Army Medical Corps
- Temp Captain Cyril McLaurin Euan-Smith MC Royal Garrison Artillery
- Major Arthur Kelly Evans MC Royal Marine Light Infantry
- Temp Captain Frederick Navaire Fane, Special List
- Lieutenant Edward Elgar Field, 5th Duke of Cornwall's Light Infantry and Royal Engineers
- Lieutenant Maurice Edward William Fitzgerald, Royal Engineers
- Temp Captain Dennis Foster, Labour Corps
- Temp Captain Frank Fox, Royal Artillery
- Lieutenant Walter Fox, Royal Engineers
- Temp Major Thomas Martin Frood, Royal Army Medical Corps
- Captain Samuel Alwyne Gabb MC Worcestershire Regiment
- Major Humphrey Percival Gamon, South Staffordshire Regiment
- Temp Captain John Cyril Gardner, Royal Army Service Corps
- Rev. Herbert Charles Gaye, Royal Army Chaplains' Department
- Captain Alexander Ebenezer McLean Geddes
- Temp Captain Charles Dennis Victor George, Royal Engineers
- Captain William Herbert Dore Giffin, Royal Army Service Corps
- Major Francis Ambrose d'Oyley Goddard, Royal Munster Fusiliers
- Lieutenant-Colonel Sydney Frederick Herbert Goffin, Financial Advisers Department
- Temp Major Ernest Gold DSO Royal Engineers
- Temp Major George Gonsalves, Royal Army Service Corps
- Captain Robert Aubrey Gooderidge, Royal Army Veterinary Corps
- Temp Captain Willis Gould, General List, attd. Royal Artillery
- Quartermaster and Major Edward Sainsbury Goulding, 1/6th Liverpool Regiment
- Lieutenant Charles Ronald Graham, General List
- Captain Harold John Graham, 3rd Dorsetshire Regiment
- Captain Stuart Colquhoun Grant, Hertfordshire Yeomanry
- Captain Geoffrey William Grasett, Royal Army Service Corps
- Captain Alexander Mungo Gray, 5th Scottish Rifles, attached Labour Corps
- Temp Major George Douglas Gray Royal Army Medical Corps
- Captain Francis Ley Augustus Greaves, Royal Army Medical Corps
- Temp Quartermaster and Captain Thomas Green, 6th Dorsetshire Regiment
- Temp Captain James Macintosh Greenall, Royal Army Service Corps
- Temp Captain Arthur Hyde Greg FRCS Royal Army Medical Corps
- Temp Captain Llewelyn Wyn Griflith, General List
- Temp Lieutenant Edmond Arthur Hudson Groom, Labour Corps
- Temp Lieutenant Douglas Hewitt Hacking, Royal Army Service Corps
- Temp Captain Norman McLeod Hall, Royal Engineers
- Captain Joseph Thomas Halligan, Royal Dublin Fusiliers
- Temp Captain Albert Hamilton, Royal Army Service Corps
- Captain Thomas Watson Hancock, Royal Army Medical Corps
- Temp Captain William Dawson Harbinson, Royal Army Ordnance Corps
- Captain Walter Hardy, Royal Garrison Artillery
- Temp Lieutenant R. George Powel Hare, Royal Army Ordnance Corps
- Temp 2nd Lieutenant Frank Harrison, Labour Corps
- Temp Captain Gilbert Hart MC Royal Engineers
- Temp Lieutenant Percy Edgar Harvey, Royal Engineers
- Captain James George Hay DSO late Gordon Highlanders
- Temp Captain John Harry Hebb Royal Army Medical Corps
- Lieutenant Alan Keith Henderson, Royal Wiltshire Yeomanry
- Captain Alexander Mitchell Henderson, Royal Artillery
- Captain Herbert Purse Henderson, Royal Army Service Corps
- Major John Steill Henderson, 1/8th Argyll and Sutherland Highlanders
- Lieutenant Matthew Bo Ian Henderson MC Royal Field Artillery
- Captain Hugh Middleton Heppel, Essex Regiment, attd. Labour Corps
- Temp Captain James John William Herbertson, General List
- Temp Captain Cecil Matthew Higgins MC Special List
- Temp Major William George Higgins, Royal Army Service Corps
- Temp Captain John Hill, Royal Army Veterinary Corps
- Major John Arthur Hill, Royal Army Service Corps
- Temp Major Reginald Day Finch Hill, Royal Army Service Corps
- Temp Captain Oswald Thomas Hatchings, Special List
- Major Reginald Arthur Hobbs, 2nd Monmouth Regiment
- Temp Captain Lionel Brewer Hogarth, General List
- Captain Henry William Holland DSO Inns of Court Officers Training Corps
- Temp Lieutenant Bernard Whelpton Holman, Royal Engineers
- Captain Samuel Edward Holmes, Royal Army Veterinary Corps
- Temp Captain Edward Stewart Hornidge, Royal Army Service Corps
- Major George William Horsfield, Royal Garrison Artillery
- Temp Honorary Major Thomas Houston, Royal Army Medical Corps
- Temp Captain William Bawson Hughes MC Royal Army Service Corps
- Major Charles Bobert Inghant Hull DSO Royal Army Service Corps
- Lieutenant-Colonel Charles John Huskinson TD 1/8th Nottinghamshire and Derbyshire Regiment
- Lieutenant Herbert John Impson MC Norfolk Regiment
- Temp Captain Arthur Lockyer Ingpen, General List
- Lieutenant Isaac Benjamin Isaacs, Royal Army Service Corps
- Captain Hugh Cleivion Jagger, Royal Army Veterinary Corps
- Temp Major Arthur Ainslie Johnson, General List
- Major Henry James Jones, Royal Army Ordnance Corps
- Lieutenant Henry Alexander Judd, 2nd King Edward's Horse
- Captain Arthur Ernest Jury, Royal Army Medical Corps
- Temp Major Bertram Francis Eardley Keeling MC Royal Engineers
- Quartermaster and Captain James Kennington General List
- Temp Captain William Lord Coke Kerr, Royal Army Service Corps
- Rev. Bernard William Keymer, Royal Army Chaplains' Department
- Captain William Bernard Richardson King, 7th Battalion, Royal Welsh Fusiliers
- Temp Quartermaster and Captain William Henry Daniel King, Machine Gun Corps
- Temp Captain William Harold Kinnersley, Royal Army Service Corps
- Lieutenant-Colonel Hubert Vernon Kitson, Royal Army Service Corps
- Captain Harold Arthur Lane, 18th London Regiment
- Captain Thomas Witheridge Langman, 5th Welsh Regiment
- Lieutenant Percy John Larter, 5th Dragoon Guards
- Temp Captain Donald Saunders Laurie, Royal Engineers
- Temp Captain Robert Douglas Laurie Royal Army Medical Corps
- Temp Major Eric St. John Lawson, General List
- Temp Captain John Hanson Lawson, Royal Engineers
- Captain Wentworth Dillon Lawson, Royal Army Service Corps
- Temp Major Claude Lancelot Leake MC General List
- Major Arthur Neale Lee DSO 7th Battalion, Nottinghamshire and Derbyshire Regiment
- Temp Captain Lancelot Raoul Lemprière Royal Army Medical Corps
- Captain Percy Vere Leresche, Royal Army Service Corps
- Temp Major Bradford Leslie, Royal Engineers
- Captain Wilfred Hubert Foyer Lewis, Glamorgan Yeomanry
- Captain Wilfrid Gordon Lindsell DSO MC Royal Artillery
- Captain Thomas Arthur Lodge, 24th Battalion, London Regiment
- Captain Sydney Herbert Long, Royal Engineers (S.R. Supplementary List)
- Captain Reginald Dawson Hopcraft Lough DSO Royal Marine Light Infantry
- Captain Harry Leslie Bache Lovatt MC 6th Battalion, South Staffordshire Regiment and Royal Engineers
- Lieutenant Robert Lindsay Loyd MC 16th Lancers and Royal Engineers
- Temp Major Gilbert Somerville Lynde, Royal Engineers
- Captain James McArthur, Royal Army Veterinary Corps
- Major Frank Alexander McCammon MC Royal Army Medical Corps
- Temp Captain Robert Stuart McCullough, Royal Army Service Corps
- Temp 2nd Lieutenant Duncan McDonald, Labour Corps
- Temp Captain Bernard Aloysius McGuire, Royal Army Veterinary Corps
- Captain George Patrick McGuire, 4th West Riding Regiment
- Captain James William Francis McLachlan, Cameron Highlanders
- Temp Captain Charles Alexander McLellan, General List
- Temp Captain James Walter McLeod Royal Army Medical Corps
- Temp Quartermaster and Captain Daniel Mahoney, 7th Border Regiment
- Captain William Francis Marchant, 20th London Regiment
- Captain Leslie Howard Marten, 9th London Regiment
- Major Albert Wilberforce Mason, retired T.F., Royal Army Veterinary Corps
- Temp Captain Henry George Mason, Royal Army Ordnance Corps
- Temp Captain Lawrence Mason MC Royal Artillery
- Major Charles Montague Hamilton Massey, Coldstream Guards
- Major Lawrence Colley Maurice, Royal Engineers
- Lieutenant Arthur Willders Montague Mawby, Royal Engineers
- Captain George David Melville MC Welsh Regiment
- Rev. Cecil Frank Miles-Cadman, Royal Army Chaplains' Department
- Lieutenant Ernest James Mills, 5th Cheshire Regiment
- Captain Geoffrey Horner Mills, Royal Army Service Corps
- Major James Jesse Mills, Royal Army Ordnance Corps
- Major Harry Weston Moggridge, 2nd City of London Yeomanry
- Captain Brian Charles Molony, Hertfordshire Regiment
- Temp Captain Roy Thornton Monier-Williams, General List
- Temp Lieutenant Bernard Donald Crawford Morgan, General List
- Temp Captain George Urquhart Morgan, Royal Engineers
- Lieutenant The Honourable Harry Nugent Morgan-Grenville, Royal Engineers
- Temp Lieutenant John Eraser Morrison, Royal Army Ordnance Corps
- Temp Captain James Finbarr Mullins, Labour Corps
- Temp Captain Wilfred George Mumford FRCS Royal Army Medical Corps
- Rev. Alfred Thomas Arthur Naylor, Royal Army Chaplains' Department
- Major William Walter Raymond Neale, Royal Army Veterinary Corps
- Brevet Lieutenant-Colonel James Owen Nelson, Worcestershire Regiment and Labour Corps
- Temp Lieutenant Maurice Michael Neville, Royal Army Service Corps
- Temp Captain William Newbold, Royal Garrison Artillery
- Captain John Campin Newman FRCS Royal Army Medical Corps
- Temp Lieutenant Samuel William Nicholas, Royal Engineers
- Temp Major Tressilian Charles Nicholas MC Royal Engineers
- Lieutenant John Gretton Oakley, 7th Hampshire Regiment and Labour Corps
- Captain Benjamin Alexander Odium, Royal Army Medical Corps
- Temp Major John William Oldfield MC General List
- Temp Major Christopher Percy Oswald, General List
- Quartermaster and Captain Joseph Thomas Packard, Royal Army Medical Corps
- Quartermaster and Major Edward Augustus Parker MC DCM 1st Royal Welsh Fusiliers
- Captain Ernest William Parks, Royal Army Veterinary Corps
- Temp Captain Arthur Nesbit Patchett, Royal Army Service Corps
- Temp Captain Edward Henry William Patridge, Royal Army Service Corps
- Lieutenant Leonard Thomas Peach, Royal Army Service Corps
- Temp Captain Richard William Pearson, Royal Army Service Corps
- Temp Captain Edward Irving Pownel Pellew, Royal Army Medical Corps
- Temp Captain Thomas Oswald Pepper, Royal Engineers
- Temp Quartermaster and Captain George John Pitt, 12th Manchester Regiment
- Captain Cyril Charlie Hamilton Potter, 10th Hussars
- Quartermaster and Captain Thomas Potter DCM Argyll and Sutherland Highlanders
- Captain Richard Pascal Power, Royal Irish Fusiliers
- Captain Basil C. Prance, Labour Corps
- Temp Major Frank Price, Royal Army Service Corps
- Lieutenant William Edward Price, 6th Welsh Regiment
- Rev. William Alfred Prunell, Royal Army Chaplains' Department
- Lieutenant Temp Captain William John Pugh, 6th Royal Welsh Fusiliers
- Captain Eustace Cuthbert Quilter, 4th Suffolk Regiment, attd. Tank Corps
- Captain Arthur Samuel Radcliff, Royal Army Service Corps
- Captain Kenneth Cochrane Raikes, Monmouthshire Regiment
- Captain Jeffrey Ramsay Royal Army Medical Corps
- Temp Major Herwald Ramsbotham MC General List
- Captain Charles Arthur Rathbone, 3rd South Lancashire Regiment
- Temp Lieutenant Cyril Percival Renouf, Tank Corps
- Captain Walter Philip Kearns Reynolds, Royal Army Service Corps
- Lieutenant Alexander Robertson Riach, Royal Army Service Corps
- Temp Major Arthur Henry Rice, General List
- Captain Thomas William Richardson, Royal Army Service Corps
- Temp Captain Arthur Patrick William Rickman, General List
- Temp Captain Thomas Clark Ritchie, Royal Army Medical Corps
- Temp Major Geoffray Dorling Roberts, General List
- Lieutenant Andrew Clark Robertson, Royal Army Service Corps
- Major Bernard Ismay Rolling DSO Royal Engineers
- Temp Captain Albert Alexander Roth, Royal Army Ordnance Corps
- Major William Edward Rothwell DSO Royal Inniskilling Fusiliers
- Captain Arthur Noel Rountree, Royal Army Service Corps
- Temp Captain Alfred Corrie Rouse, Royal Army Service Corps
- Temp Captain Ernest George Rowden, Special List
- Major Albert Henry Royds, Scots Guards
- Lieutenant Alan Arthur Saunders, Royal Engineers
- Temp Captain Alexander Patterson Scotland, Special List
- Temp Captain The Honourable Michael Scott, Special List
- Major William Selby-Lowndes, Bedford Yeomanry
- Temp Lieutenant-Colonel Theophilus Hengist Sergeant, General List
- Captain Aubrey Temple Sharp, 6th Battalion, Leicestershire Regiment and Machine Gun Corps
- Temp Major Frederick Arthur Shaw, Labour Corps
- Captain Peter Shaw, Lancaster Hussars and Tank Corps
- Captain Edward Sigrist, Royal Army Ordnance Corps
- Lieutenant-Colonel Alexander Petrie Simpson, Royal Scots
- Lieutenant William Thomas Smellie, 6th Argyll and Sutherland Highlanders
- Temp Lieutenant Albert George Smith, Royal Engineers (Signal Service)
- Quartermaster and Captain John William Smith, 1st King's Shropshire Light Infantry
- Temp Captain Leslie Harcourt Smith, General List, late East Yorkshire Regiment
- Lieutenant-Colonel Alfred Bertram Soltau CMG Royal Army Medical Corps
- Temp Major Arnold Colin Somervell, Royal Army Service Corps
- Lieutenant-Colonel Edward Wilfred Spedding CMG Royal Field Artillery
- Temp Captain Ralph Henley Speed, Royal Army Service Corps
- Temp Major Harold Ernest Spencer, Royal Engineers
- Temp Major Francis Jeffries Spranger, Royal Army Ordnance Corps
- Quartermaster and Captain John Winchester Springhall, East Yorkshire Regiment
- Captain George William Robert Stackpoole DSO South Staffordshire Regiment
- Temp Captain Waddington Stafford, Royal Army Service Corps
- Temp Major William Stanford, Royal Field Artillery
- Temp Major James Stanley, General List
- Major Reginald William Starkey Stanton, Yorkshire Light Infantry
- Temp Lieutenant Frank Joseph Starr, Special List
- Lieutenant Hubert Stanley Stephens, Honourable Artillery Company
- Captain James Stevenson, Royal Engineers
- Major Herbert Arthur Stewart DSO Royal Army Service Corps
- Temp Captain William Hendry Burgess Stewart, Royal Engineers
- Captain George Edward Stokes, 15th London Regiment
- Temp Lieutenant Philip Arthur Stone, Royal Army Service Corps
- Captain Alan Thomas Trevor Storey, South Lancashire Regiment
- Temp Captain Orlando Sumner, Royal Engineers
- Major William Greenwood Sutcliffe, Royal Army Medical Corps
- Captain Arthur Henry Carr Sutherland MC Royal Highlanders
- Temp Lieutenant Willam Hugh Swallow, Royal Army Ordnance Corps
- Temp Lieutenant Francis Hugh Swanzy, Royal Army Ordnance Corps
- Rev. Frank Morris Sykes, Royal Army Chaplains' Department
- Temp Major Henry Pascoe Blair Tayler DSO General List
- Quartermaster and Captain Alfred William Taylor MC 9th West Yorkshire Regiment
- Temp Captain Charles Gerald Taylor, Royal Army Service Corps
- Lieutenant-Colonel Charles Hillsborough Rimington Taylor, 4th Battalion, Essex Regiment and Labour Corps
- Temp Captain Frederick Henry Tebay, Royal Garrison Artillery
- Lieutenant-Colonel Henry Lancelot Tennant, Royal Field Artillery
- Captain Joseph Makepeace Thackeray, 3rd Suffolk Regiment and Labour Corps
- Captain Reginald Sparshatt Thatcher MC 3rd Somerset Light Infantry
- Major David Brodie Thomas, Leicestershire Regiment
- Captain George Pollard Thomas, Royal Garrison Artillery
- Temp Lieutenant Sydney Arnold Thomas, Royal Engineers
- Temp Captain Thomas Charles Thomas, Labour Corps
- Major Cecil Henry Farrer Thompson DSO London Regiment
- Temp Lieutenant Reginald Ernest Thompson, Royal Army Service Corps
- Major Alan Charles Tod, Royal Field Artillery
- Lieutenant Geoffrey Stewart Tomkinson MC Worcestershire Regiment
- Quartermaster and Captain Thomas Toohill, Royal Army Service Corps
- Temp Major Edward Charles Lyndhurst Towne, Labour Corps
- Temp Captain Charles Stancomb Lisle Trask, General List
- Temp Captain Frank Newton Tribe, General List
- Major Lechmere Howell Tudor, South Wales Borderers
- Temp Captain James Lockley Turner, Royal Army Service Corps
- Captain Montagu Trevor Turner, 3rd Sussex Regiment
- Major Thomas Barton Unwin Royal Army Medical Corps
- Temp Lieutenant Winchcombe Norman Carpenter Van Grutten MC Royal Artillery
- Temp Lieutenant-Colonel Voltelin Albert William Van der Byl, 1st Cape Coloured Labour Battalion
- Temp Quartermaster and Captain James Varley, Royal Army Medical Corps
- Captain Guy Noel Vivian, Grenadier Guards
- Captain William Warwick Wagstaffe Royal Army Medical Corps
- Temp Captain James Blake Walker, Royal Army Veterinary Corps
- Temp Captain Kenneth Macfarlane Walker FRCS Royal Army Medical Corps
- Brevet Major Charles John Wallace DSO MC Highland Light Infantry
- Temp Captain Henry Douglas Delves Walthall, Royal Army Service Corps
- Temp Captain Felix Walter Warre MC General List
- Major Robert Edward Webb, York & Lancaster Regiment
- Captain George Frederick Anderson Webster, Royal Army Ordnance Corps
- Captain Herbert Mansfield Whitehead, 7th Battalion, Nottinghamshire and Derbyshire Regiment
- Rev. Richard B. Wilkinson, Royal Army Chaplains' Department
- Temp Major John Eason Wilks, Royal Army Service Corps, attd. Tank Corps
- Lieutenant Alfred Dalby Ross Williams, Royal Garrison Artillery
- Temp Lieutenant Roger Francis Williams, Royal Engineers
- Major Sir Gilbert Alan Hamilton Wills Bt Royal North Devonshire Yeomanry
- Temp Lieutenant Andrew Wilson, Royal Engineers
- Temp Captain Humphrey Bowstead Wilson Royal Army Medical Corps
- Lieutenant-Colonel William Quintyne Winwood CMG DSO 5th Dragoon Guards
- Captain Thomas Blakeway Wolstenholme, Royal Army Medical Corps
- Captain Alexander Lewis Sandison Wood, Royal Army Service Corps
- Lieutenant-Colonel Ernest Wood DSO Royal Army Service Corps, 5th Divisional Train
- Major Ernest James Woodley, York & Lancaster Regiment
- Temp Lieutenant Charles Archie Worssam, Royal Army Ordnance Corps
- Captain Frank Worthington DSO Royal Army Medical Corps
- Captain Donald Henry FitzThomas Wyley MC Royal Field Artillery
- Brevet Major Owen Evelyn Wynne, Royal Engineers
- Temp Captain Noel Leigh Yorke, Royal Army Service Corps

=== For services rendered in connection with military operations in France and Flanders ===
- Major William Frederick Alderson, Canadian Army Service Corps
- Major George Grassie Archibald, 1st Central Ontario Regiment
- Captain Nevill Alexander Drummond Armstrong, 16th Battalion, Manitoba Regiment
- Lieutenant George Russell Birch, Canadian Ordnance Corps
- Lieutenant-Colonel Percy Gordon Brown, Canadian Army Medical Corps
- Major John Frederick Burgess, Canadian Army Medical Corps
- Lieutenant-Colonel Frank John Carew, Canadian Forestry Corps
- Lieutenant-Colonel Harry James Cowan, Saskatchewan Regiment
- Lieutenant-Colonel Anson Dulmage, Saskatchewan Regiment, attached Labour Corps
- Honorary Captain George Wilfred Fisher, Canadian Young Men's Christian Association
- Captain John Dennin Grimsdick, Manitoba Regiment
- Major William Sinclair Herchmer, Canadian Forestry Corps
- Captain Hedley Hill, Canadian Army Pay Corps
- Honorary Captain William Burton Hurd, Canadian Young Men's Christian Association
- Quartermaster and Honorary Captain William Henry Lettice, 47th Battalion, Western Ontario Regiment
- Major Norman James Lindsay, Canadian Army Service Corps (M.T.)
- Major Robert James McEwan, Canadian Army Medical Corps
- Major James William McLeod, Canadian Army Service Corps
- Captain William Cameron Mackintosh, 28th Battalion, Saskatchewan Regiment
- Lieutenant Charles Barker Maxwell, Canadian General List
- Lieutenant-Colonel Henry Montgomery-Campbell, Nova Scotia Regiment
- Lieutenant-Colonel Hugh Edwin Munroe, Canadian Army Medical Corps
- Temp Major Kenneth A. Murray, Canadian Army Postal Corps
- Major Harold Orr, Canadian Army Medical Corps
- Captain Creighton Ross Palmer, Canadian Army Pay Corps
- Captain Samuel Charles Richards, Canadian Army Veterinary Corps
- Captain Albert Angus Richardson, Canadian Engineers
- Captain William Adam Robertson, Canadian Army Veterinary Corps
- Major Charles Wilson Robinson, Canadian Forestry Corps
- Major William Henry Robinson, Canadian Army Service Corps
- Lieutenant-Colonel Charles McAdam Scott, Canadian Army Service Corps
- Captain Cecil Compton Thomas, Canadian Army Service Corps
- Major William Raymond Thomson, Canadian Army Pay Corps
- Captain Frederick William Utton, 14th Canadian Infantry Battalion
- Major Harold Weatherald Webster, Canadian Army Service Corps (M.T.)
- Matron Bertha Jane Willoughby RRC Canadian Army Medical Corps

=== Australian Imperial Force ===
For services rendered in connection with military operations in France and Flanders:

- Captain Robert Cairns Amis Anderson, 19th Battalion, Australian Imperial Force
- Captain Robert Gordon Chirnside, General List, Australian Imperial Force
- Major John William Donnelly, General List, Australian Imperial Force
- Major David Moore Embelton, Australian Army Medical Corps
- Major Charles Napier Finn, Australian Army Medical Corps
- Captain William Lockhart Hamilton, Australian Army Service Corps
- Lieutenant Gordon John Cooper Hargreaves, Australian Engineers
- Captain Charles Howard Helsham, 5th Pioneer Battalion, Australian Imperial Force
- Lieutenant-Colonel Frank le Leu Henley DSO Australian Army Service Corps
- Major Reginald Mitchell Hore, Australian Army Veterinary Corps
- Captain Sydney Arthur Hunn MC 32nd Battalion, Australian Imperial Force
- Major Arthur Wellesley Hyman, 51st Battalion, Australian Imperial Force
- Captain Samuel Barningham Lacey, Australian Army Service Corps
- Captain Harry James Lane, Australian Army Service Corps
- Major John Thomas McColl MC 40th Battalion, Australian Imperial Force
- Major Alfred Fay Maclure, Australian Army Medical Corps
- Major Frank Keith Officer MC Australian General List
- Captain Leslie Clive Parker, Australian General List
- Major Charles Walter Robinson, Australian Army Service Corps

=== New Zealand Overseas Force ===
- Captain Frank Lawton Hindley, Canterbury Mounted Rifles (New Zealand)
- Major Frank Woolmer Parker, New Zealand Army Service Corps
- Captain Richard Errol Wardell Riddiford MC Wellington Regiment (New Zealand)
- Major Louis Murray Shera MC New Zealand Engineers

For valuable services rendered in connection with Military Operations in Egypt:

- Temp Lieutenant James Richard Alderson, Royal Army Service Corps
- Captain Vere Ayscott Bartrum, Royal Army Veterinary Corps
- Captain Thomas Blackwood Beveridge, 5th Battalion, Argyll and Sutherland Highlanders
- Temp Major Arthur Thomson Binney, Royal Army Service Corps
- Captain Walter Boyle, Royal Engineers
- Captain Rupert Briercliffe Royal Army Medical Corps
- Lieutenant Frank Bustard, 5th Battalion, Royal Lancaster Regiment
- Temp Captain Francis Sam Butter, Royal Army Service Corps
- Captain Roy Neil Boyd Campbell, 2nd Battalion, 23rd Sikh Pioneers (Indian Army)
- Captain David Simpson Carson, 8th Battalion, Scottish Rifles
- Temp Major or Lionel Melville Clark, Royal Army Service Corps
- Lieutenant-Colonel Robert Leaver Clark DSO Royal Army Ordnance Corps
- Temp Captain Gerald Leslie Makins Clouson, General List
- Temp Major Arthur Annerley Corder CMG Royal Army Ordnance Corps
- Rev. Felix Couturier MC Royal Army Chaplains' Department
- Captain and Brevet Major George Keeble Crichton MC Royal Army Service Corps
- Temp Captain William Henry Costhwaite, Special List
- Lieutenant-Colonel Percy Henry Cunningham, Indian Army
- Captain Wilfred John Dale, Royal Army Veterinary Corps
- Major Percy Chandos Farquhar de Paravicini, Lincolnshire Yeomanry
- Temp Major CamilleDes Clayes, Royal Army Service Corps
- Temp Captain Frank Holt Diggle FRCS Royal Army Medical Corps
- Temp Captain Charles Frederick Draper, Royal Engineers
- Captain Montagu Richard William Duberly, 1st Battalion, 23rd Sikhs Pioneers
- Quartermaster and Captain Albert Edward Dunstan, Royal Army Service Corps
- Major William Dyson Royal Army Medical Corps
- Major William Francis Ellis, Royal Army Medical Corps
- Rev. James Charles Fitzgerald, Royal Army Chaplains' Department
- Major Alexander Kempson Fletcher, Reserve of Officers
- Temp Captain William Wood Forbes, Royal Army Medical Corps
- Temp Captain Harold Arthur Fox, Royal Army Service Corps
- Temp Captain Norman Stephen Gilchrist Royal Army Medical Corps, attd. Royal Air Force
- Lieutenant-Colonel James Godding TD 17th Battalion, London Regiment
- Major Farquhar Gracie Royal Army Medical Corps
- Major Court Granville, 3rd (Reserve) Battalion, Devonshire Regiment, attd. 1st Garrison Battalion, Royal Warwickshire Regiment
- Temp Captain Robert Windham Graves CMG Special List
- Temp Major George Graydonald, Royal Engineers
- Captain Hugh Manley Gregory, Royal Army Service Corps
- Local Captain Gabriel Haddad
- Temp Lieutenant Reginald Cutler Haddon, Royal Army Service Corps
- Captain Walter Johnston Halsey, 4th Battalion, Bedfordshire Regiment
- Major John Edgar Hill, 5th Battalion, Bedfordshire Regiment
- Captain Richardson Johnson Houghton, Cheshire Yeomanry
- Captain Eustace Arnold How, 20th Battalion, Rifle Brigade
- Temp Lieutenant John Francis Hubbard, Coldstream Guards and Special List
- Captain John Inglis, Royal Army Medical Corps
- Temp Captain Arthur Henry Jolliffe, Royal Engineers
- Major Philip Welman Justice, Royal Garrison Artillery
- Captain Thomas Fuller Kennedy Royal Army Medical Corps
- Temp Lieutenant Ernest Lake, Royal Engineers
- Lieutenant-Colonel George Frederick Handel McDonald, Essex Regiment
- Temp Major Mervyn Sorly MacDonnell, Special List
- Major John William Mackenzie Royal Army Medical Corps
- Temp Captain Norman James Macowan, Royal Army Service Corps
- Captain Lachlan Martin Victor Mitchell Royal Army Medical Corps
- Major Harry Francis Beauchamp Seymour Moore, Royal Engineers
- Temp Lieutenant Oswald Facer Odell, Special List
- Captain St. John Renwick Pigott, Irish Guards and Special List
- Major Hugh Bateman Protheroe-Smith, 21st Lancers
- Captain Charles John Ratcliff, Gloucestershire Hussars Yeomanry
- Major William Ritchie, Royal Field Artillery
- Captain Thomas Rodliffe, Royal Army Ordnance Corps
- Local Lieutenant-Colonel Charles Frederick Ryder
- Temp Lieutenant Robert Hamilton Scott DSO General List
- Major Arthur William Woodman Simpson, Manchester Regiment
- Temp Captain Charles William Smith FRCS Royal Army Medical Corps
- Temp Major Vincent Smith, Royal Army Service Corps
- Captain Hubert Smithers, Royal West Kent Regiment
- Lieutenant-Colonel George Elliot Frank Stammers, Royal Army Medical Corps
- Captain Frederic Claude Stern MC 2nd County of London Yeomanry
- Rev. John Featherstone Stirling, Royal Army Chaplains' Department
- Temp Lieutenant Percy Wyfold Stout DSO General List
- Lieutenant-Colonel William Benjamin Sudds, Royal Army Ordnance Corps
- Temp Major Percy Joseph Ignatius Synnott, Special List, late Inniskilling Dragoons
- Captain William Ironsides Tait, Suffolk Regiment, attd. Royal Engineers
- Major Gerard Charles Taylor Royal Army Medical Corps
- Temp Major Ernest Tillard, Special List, attd. Royal Engineers
- Brevet Major Godfrey Ebenezer Tilly ard, Royal Army Veterinary Corps
- Major Frederick Beaumont Treves Royal Army Medical Corps
- Temp Captain John Holmes Ure, Royal Engineers
- Captain Phillip Sefton Vickorman FRCS Royal Army Medical Corps (Special Reserve)
- Captain Alexander Pirie Watson FRCS Royal Army Medical Corps
- Captain Russell Primrose Wells DSO 15th Hussars, and Special List
- Temp Captain Albert Williams, Special List
- Rev. John Plumpton Wilson, Royal Army Chaplains' Department
- Temp Captain Harold Woods, General List
- Major Horace Leaf Wright, Northamptonshire Regiment

=== Australian Imperial Force ===
- Lieutenant-Colonel Charles Bickerton Blackburn, Australian Army Medical Corps
- Major Niel Hamilton Fairley, Australian Army Medical Corps
- Lieutenant-Colonel Robert Fowler, Australian Army Medical Corps
- Major John Henry Hammond, Australian Army Pay Corps
- Major John Kendall, Australian Army Veterinary Corps
- Lieutenant Colonel John Colvin Storey, Australian Army Medical Corps
- Honorary Major John James Trictett, Australian Imperial Force Canteens
- Rev. William Maitland Woods VD Australian Army Chaplains' Department

=== Egyptian Army ===
- El Miralai Ali Bay Shauki, Egyptian Army Reserve
- El Bimbashi Mohammed Effendi Kamel Shalabi, 2nd Battalion, Egyptian Army

For services rendered in connection with Military Operations in Egypt:

- Rev. Maurice Thomas Beckett, Royal Army Chaplains' Department
- Captain Thomas Bone MC Royal Army Veterinary Corps
- Captain Frank Leader Brown, Royal Engineers
- Lieutenant Vernon Brown, Northern Cyclist Battalion
- Captain George Willis Browne, 4th Battalion, Royal Warwickshire Regiment
- Temp Major Sir Richard Pierce Butler Bt Remount Department
- Quartermaster and Major Thomas Clements, Durham Light Infantry
- Temp Captain Christopher George Coates, Royal Army Service Corps
- Temp Captain Edward Sinnott Coltman, Royal Army Service Corps
- Captain Vere Egerton Cotton, Royal Field Artillery
- Captain Sir Percy Francis Cunynghame Bt late 5th Battalion, Middlesex Regiment
- Lieutenant Norman Dewhurst, Royal Army Service Corps
- Captain William John Bales, 1/7th Battalion, Middlesex Regiment
- Lieutenant William Eatherley, Royal Garrison Artillery
- Captain David Howard Evans, 2nd Dragoon Guards
- Major Arthur Kennet Hay DSO Royal Field Artillery
- Captain John Sturgess Burrow Hill MC 1st Buckinghamshire Battalion, Oxfordshire & Buckinghamshire Light Infantry
- Major Arthur Hippisley, Royal Garrison Artillery
- Temp Major Henry Noel Hoare DSO Royal Army Service Corps
- Temp Captain Harry Drake Hodgkinson, Royal Army Service Corps
- Temp Captain Reginald Valentine Holmes, Royal Army Service Corps
- Captain Thomas Douglas Inch MC Royal Army Medical Corps
- Temp Major Percy Sidney Inskipp, Royal Army Service Corps
- Quartermaster and Major Bernard Frederick Jones, 1/7th Battalion, Royal Warwickshire Regiment
- Temp Captain Gerald Francis Jones, Royal Engineers
- Temp Captain Frank Limb, Royal Army Service Corps (M.T.)
- Temp Captain Herbert William Longdin, Royal Engineers
- Captain Frank Brigham Mitchell, 4th Battalion, East Lancashire Regiment
- Temp Captain Patrick Moncreiff Murray MC General List
- Temp Major Cornelius William Myddleton, Royal Engineers
- Major Frank Herbert Norbury, Royal Army Service Corps
- Major Herbert Charles Owen MC 5th (Reserve) Battalion, The Middlesex Regiment
- Captain Andrew Picken Royal Army Medical Corps
- Temp Major Wilfred Harry Pryce, Special List
- Temp Captain Herbert James Ratcliffe, General List
- Temp Major Richard Cooke Ridley, Royal Army Service Corps
- Major Arthur Henry Roberts DSO Royal Army Service Corps
- Temp Major Ernest Albert Rose, Royal Army Service Corps
- Temp Major DennisSpurling, Royal Field Artillery
- Temp Captain Dickinson Starkey, Royal Army Veterinary Corps
- Captain William Stothert, Royal Army Veterinary Corps
- Major Cuthbert Gambier Ryves Sydney-Turner DSO Royal Army Service Corps
- Temp Captain William John Tipping, General List
- Captain John Charles Tribe, Royal Garrison Artillery, attd. Royal Army Ordnance Corps
- Major Charles Jerome Vaughan, Royal Engineers
- Major Philip Henry Norris Nugent Vyvyan MC Royal Army Service Corps
- Captain Joseph Douglas Wells Royal Army Medical Corps
- Temp Major Douglas Wood, General List

For valuable services rendered in connection with Military Operations in Salonika:

- Quartermaster and Major William Murray Allan, 2nd Battalion, Northumberland Fusiliers
- Temp Captain David Irving Anderson Royal Army Medical Corps
- Temp Captain James Connor Maxwell Bailey Royal Army Medical Corps
- Temp Captain George Victor Bakewell Royal Army Medical Corps
- Captain Francis Brock Barker, Royal Engineers
- Captain Thomas Yuille Barkley Royal Army Medical Corps
- Lieutenant-Colonel Michael Biddulph, Army Pay Department
- Temp Major Alfre de Granville Birch, Royal Army Service Corps
- Quartermaster and Captain Edgar Charles Boulter, Royal Army Service Corps
- Lieutenant-Colonel Michael Boyle Royal Army Medical Corps
- Temp Major Warwick Wellington Briggs, Royal Army Service Corps
- Temp Captain Robert Francis Bryant, Royal Army Service Corps
- Temp Major Harold Tullis Chambers, Royal Army Service Corps
- Temp Captain Amos Hubert Coleman Royal Army Medical Corps
- Temp Captain Paul Eugene Cremetti, General List
- Temp Captain Joseph Edward Davies, Royal Army Service Corps
- Temp Captain James Anthony Delmege, Royal Army Medical Corps
- Temp Captain Charles Esmond de Wolff, Royal Army Ordnance Corps
- Captain Archibald Hamilton James Douglas-Campbell, 4th Battalion, Argyll and Sutherland Highlanders
- Temp Captain Frederick Habler Downie, 23rd Battalion, Welsh Regiment
- Temp Captain William Burton Elwes, Royal Engineers
- Temp Captain Robert Richard Elworthy Royal Army Medical Corps
- Temp Captain William Archdall Ffooks, General List
- Brevet Major Geoffrey Nigel FitzJohn, Worcestershire Regiment
- Captain Walter Barham Foley Royal Army Medical Corps
- Temp Major or Charles Horace Fox, Royal Engineers
- Major William Rickards Galwey MC Royal Army Medical Corps
- Rev. Thomas Vernon Garnier, Royal Army Chaplains' Department
- Temp Captain Harold Elsdale Goad, Special List
- Major John Gray, Royal Army Medical Corps
- Major Walter Lewis Harrison FRCVS Royal Army Veterinary Corps
- Lieutenant-Colonel John Edward Hodgson, Royal Army Medical Corps
- Rev. John Oliver Hornabrook, Royal Army Chaplains' Department
- Temp Captain Oswald Egerton Orme Jackson, General List
- Temp Captain Daniel Judson, General List
- Temp Captain Edward Kidson, Royal Engineers
- Temp Major or James Cornyn Lewis Knight-Bruce, Special List
- Temp Captain Langlois Massey Lefroy, General List
- Captain Hugh Ernest McColl Royal Army Medical Corps
- Lieutenant-Colonel Peter Mitchell Royal Army Medical Corps
- Temp Captain George Moir, Royal Army Veterinary Corps
- Captain Francis Edward Orange-Bromehead, Royal Engineers
- Temp Captain John Elliott Paddey, Royal Engineers
- Temp Lieutenant-Colonel John Bardsley Parkhouse, General List
- Temp Lieutenant Temp Major Stanley Ernest Parkhouse, Royal Engineers
- Captain William Jackson Perkins MC 5th Battalion, Royal West Surrey Regiment
- Rev. Albert Bertrand Purdie, Royal Army Chaplains' Department
- Temp Captain Walter Nevelle Scholes, Royal Engineers
- Temp Major Leslie Shingleton, Royal Engineers
- Temp Captain Arthur William Smith, Royal Garrison Artillery
- Lieutenant-Colonel Oscar Striedinger DSO Royal Army Service Corps
- Captain Julian Taylor FRCS Royal Army Medical Corps
- Captain William Henry McNeile Verschoyle Campbell MC Royal Army Ordnance Corps
- Lieutenant Charles Walter Villiers DSO Coldstream Guards
- Major Charles Bishop Walker, Royal Army Service Corps
- Lieutenant-Colonel Frederick Edward Apthorpe Webb, Royal Army Medical Corps
- Rev. Howard Melville Webb-Peploe, Royal Army Chaplains' Department
- Temp Major Evelyn Valentine Wellings, Royal Army Service Corps
- Captain Edward Lycett Wheelwright, 3rd (Reserve), attd. 1st Battalion, Yorkshire Light Infantry
- Captain Reginald Maitland Wilson, Cheshire Yeomanry
- Temp Major Philip Humphrey Wyatt, Royal Army Service Corps

For valuable services rendered in connection with Military Operations in North Russia:

- Temp Captain F. Chambers, Royal Army Veterinary Corps
- Captain Ralph Chenevix-Trench MC Royal Engineers
- Temp Lieutenant A. W. Kearn, Royal Army Ordnance Corps
- Captain G. Steele, Northamptonshire Yeomanry
- Temp Major Ralph Shenton Griffin Stokes DSO MC Royal Engineers

Royal Air Force

- Major Charles Francis Abell
- Major George Henry Abell
- Captain Reginald Addenbrooke-Prout MC
- Captain George Charlton Anne
- Major Felton Clayson Atkinson
- Major Harold Gordon Atkinson
- Captain Henry Fox Atkinson-Clark
- Major Herbert Arthur Reginald Aubrey MC
- Captain Lawrence Auker
- Captain Sidney Robert Axford
- Captain William Edgar Aylwin MBE
- Captain Lionel Percy Ball
- Captain Aiden James Wharton Barmby
- Captain Allen Stewart Barnfield
- Major Robert John Fergusois Barton
- Captain Thomas George Baxenden
- Major John George Bayes
- Major Victor Douglas Bell
- Lieutenant-Colonel Bertram Richard White Beor
- Lieutenant-Colonel Edward Gerald Oakley Beuttler
- Major Henry Francis Tozer Blowey
- Lieutenant-Colonel Ian Malcolm Bonham-Carter
- Captain Claude Herbert Dick Bonnett
- Lieutenant-Colonel James Bevan Bowen
- Lieutenant-Colonel Geoffrey Rhodes Bromet DSO
- Captain Francis Giles Brown
- Major Thomas Bullen
- Captain William Douglas Budgen
- Captain Christopher Llewellyn Bullock
- Captain Cyril Gordon Burge
- Captain John Wotherspoon Burt
- Major Horace Austin Buss DSC
- Major Charles Adrian James Butter
- Major Donald Hay Cameron
- Lieutenant-Colonel Edward Oliver Bamford Carbery
- Major Rowland Dobree Carey
- Major Silas Bernard Foley Carter
- Major Frederick Foster Chambers
- Major Ronald Cockburn
- Major Reginald Blayney Bulteel Colmore
- Lieutenant-Colonel Daniel Goodwin Conner
- Captain Robert Ewing-Cook
- Major Ion Alexander Scott Cooke
- Major James Percy Carre Cooper MC
- Honorary Major Herbert John Corin, L.D.S., R.C.S
- Lieutenant-Colonel Jasper Wallace Cruickshank
- Captain Howard Cumming
- Captain Walter John Brice Curtis
- Major Walford Davies
- Major Francis Robert Edward Davis
- Captain Harold Bentley Denton
- Major Rene de Sarigny, South African Forces
- Lieutenant-Colonel Francis Richard Drake
- Major Chester Stairs Duffus MC
- Lieutenant-Colonel John Dunville
- Captain Percy Granville Edge MBE
- Lieutenant-Colonel Charles Humphrey Kingsman Edmonds DSO
- Captain Thomas Macdonald Eggar
- Captain James Boyne Elliott
- Major Stuart Oswald Everitt
- Captain William Walter Farthing
- Lieutenant-Colonel Louis Frederick Rudston Fell DSO
- Major William James Fernie
- Lieutenant-Colonel Cecil Fraser MC
- Captain Francis William Ian Victor Fraser MC
- Lieutenant-Colonel George William Frederick Fraser
- Major Max Freeman
- Major Charles William Gamble MBE
- Major Thomas Richard Henty Garrett
- Acting Major William Walker Gibson MBE
- Major Thomas Edward Gilmore
- Major Stanley James Goble DSO DSC
- Lieutenant-Colonel Norman Goldsmith
- Captain Cedric Foskett Gordon MC
- Captain Frank James Gray
- Captain The Honourable Lionel George William Guest
- Major Alfred Kingsley Hall
- Captain Ernest Samuel Halford
- Captain William Stanley Hammond
- Major George Daniel Hannay
- Captain John Frederick Hawkins
- Major Robert Cholerton Hayes
- Major George Hazelton
- Major Alfred Stanley Hellawell
- Captain Richard Gustavus Heyn
- Major John Harris Hills MBE
- Major Robert Hilton-Jones
- Captain William Hodgson
- Captain Ernest Holloway
- Major Ernest James Howard
- Major Ernest Henry Johnston
- Major Frank Jolly
- Major Stuart Samuel Kennedy
- Major Charles Frederick Krabbe MBE
- Captain Clarence Brehmer Krabbe
- Major George Laing
- Captain James Arthur Maule Lang
- Lieutenant-Colonel William Henry Lang
- Major Henry Charles Theodore Langdon
- Major Frederick Charles Victor Laws
- Captain Harold Roger Lecomber
- Lieutenant-Colonel Cecil John l'Estrange-Malone
- Captain Leonard Moore Lilley
- Captain Reginald Stuart Lindsell
- Major John William Lantott
- Captain Philip Norman Logan
- Major Walter Dixon Long
- Captain Theodore Ernie Longridge
- Major Frederick William Lucas
- Major Thomas Lyons MBE
- Captain George Buchanan McClure
- Captain Samuel McClure
- Major James Ronald McCrindle MC
- Captain Colin Temple McLaren
- Major William Lockwood Marsh
- Captain Reginald Ferdinando Maitland
- Major Alfred Ridley Martin
- Captain Thomas Martin
- Captain Richard Beauchamp Maycock
- Lieutenant-Colonel Arthur Harold Measures
- Major Charles Edward Hastings Medhurst MC
- Captain Edward Patrick Alexander Melville
- Lieutenant-Colonel Malcolm David Methven
- Major William Charles Michie
- Major Arnold John Miley MBE
- Lieutenant-Colonel Robert Harry Mornement
- Major Alfred Samuel Morris
- Major Roland James Mounsey
- Major Charles Joseph Murfitt
- Major Percy Murray John Murrell
- Captain Douglas Gordon Nairn
- Major Stanley Sharp Nevill
- Captain Norman Dakeyne Newall
- Captain Leslie Newman
- Major Herbert John Newton-Clare
- Major Francis Arthur Gerard Noel
- Captain John Tom North
- Major Harry Robert Northoyer MC
- Major Charles Percy Ogden
- Major Brefney Rolph O'Reilly Canadian Local Forces
- Captain Henry William Moncrieff Paul MC
- Major Gerald Selwyn Peacock
- Captain Joseph Pearce
- Captain Eugene Courtney Perrin
- Lieutenant-Colonel Thomas Brocklehurst Phillips, late 13th Hussars, and formerly attached Air Board
- Major Geoffrey Denzie Pidgeon
- Major Robert Kingsley Pillers
- Major William Joseph Polyblank
- Major Enoch Powell
- Lieutenant-Colonel George Frederick Pretyman DSO
- Major Charles Edmond Prince MBE
- Major Con way Walker Heath Pulford
- Captain Frederick Bygrave Pulham
- Captain Stamford Cecil Raffles
- Captain William Oswald Raikes MBE
- Major Donald Rainsford-Hannay
- Major George Martin Treherne Rees
- Captain Robert Alburne Reid
- Major Vincent Crane Richmond
- Major Thomas Edward Robertson
- Major Alexander Augustus Edmund Robinson
- Major Alick Christopher Robinson
- Captain John Rubie
- Major William John Ryan MBE
- Lieutenant-Colonel Leslie Sadler
- Major Frederick Lewellen Scholte
- Lieutenant-Colonel Francis Claude Shelmerdine
- Major the Right Honourable Sir John Allsebrook Simon KCVO KC
- Captain Gerald Arthur Sinclair-Hill
- Major Sidney Vincent Sippe DSO
- Major Charles Gainer Smith
- Lieutenant-Colonel Sidney Ernest Smith
- Major John Trevor Spittle
- Captain Frederick Gunning Stammers
- Captain Edward Parker Stapleton
- Lieutenant-Colonel John Starling
- Major Ernest Walker Stedman
- Major Alfred Horace Steele Steele-Perkins
- Major Frank Harold Stephens, Medical Service
- Major Edward Stokes
- Major Arthur Struben, South African Engineers
- Major Bertine Entwistle Sutton DSO MC
- Captain Otho Vincent Thomas
- Captain Rudall Woodliffe Thomas
- Acting Major John Edmund Burnet Thornely
- Captain Francis William Trott MC
- Major Arthur Kellam Tylee
- Captain Anthony Herbert William Wall MC
- Captain Vere Ward-Brown MC
- Major Francis Cartwright Williams
- Major Richard Williams DSO Australian Flying Corps
- Captain Frank Gordon Wilson
- Major Francis Augustus John Bartholomew Wiseman
- Captain Murdick McKenzie Wood
- Captain Gilbert de Lacy Wooldridge
- Major Harold Wyllie
- Major Alfred Hearst Wynn Elias Wynn
- Captain Walter Gerald Paul Young

Women's Royal Air Force

- Assistant Commandant, Class I Winifred Powell
- Assistant Commandant, Class II Mary Edwards
- Assistant Commandant, Class II Margaret Moss

Indian Army

- Lieutenant-Colonel Richard Carmichael Bell DSO 38th Central Indian Horse
- Major Charles Edward Bruce, Indian Army, Political Department, late Political Officer, Mari Punitive Force, Baluchistan
- Brevet Colonel James William Cowey, late Indian Army
- Lieutenant-Colonel Robert Henry Dewing, late Indian Army
- 2nd Lieutenant Frederick Wingfield Douglas, Labour Corps and Indian Army Reserve of Officers
- Captain John Charles Gammon, General List and Indian Army Reserve of Officers
- Captain David Livingstone Graham Indian Medical Service
- Major John Kendall, late Indian Army
- Major Frederick James Sharpies Lowry, Indian Army
- Temp Lieutenant Kaikobad Rustony Madan, Indian Medical Service
- Colonel Ambrose William Newbold, Indian Army
- Lieutenant-Colonel Hugh Frederick Archie Pearson, 1st Battalion, 23rd Sikh Pioneers (Indian Army)
- Captain Rupert Simson, retired, Indian Army
- Major Ralph Henry Hammersley-Smith, 14th Lancers, Indian Army
- Lieutenant-Colonel and Brevet Colonel Henry Templer, Indian Army

== Civil Division ==
- Mary Rothes Margaret, Baroness Amherst of Hackney, Chief of the Rural Section, National Salvage Department
- Alexander Colin Anderson, For services with the British Expeditionary Force in Russia
- Maurice Fitzgerald Anderson, Assistant Sub-Commissioner, Trade Exemptions, Scottish Region, Ministry of National Service
- Captain Sydney James Hounsell Angel, Master of the Transport Australind
- Francis Joseph Armstrong, Senior Clerk, Scottish Education Department, Edinburgh; Secretary to Departmental Committee on Remuneration of Teachers
- Captain Percy Harland Atkin, Secretary, Military Service Committee, Scottish Education Department, London
- Harold Cholmley Mansfield Austen, Superintending Engineer, Department of Engineering, Ministry of Munitions
- William Rebotier Aveline, Chief Engineer, Asiatic Petroleum Company Limited
- James Black Baillie Professor of Philosophy, Aberdeen University
- William David Barber ISO Civil Assistant to Hydrographer, Admiralty
- Mabel Emily Barber, Lady Superintendent, H.R.H. Princess Victoria's Best Club, St. Omer
- Thomas James Barnes, Temporary Legal Assistant, Ministry of Shipping
- Barclay Baron, in charge of Fourth Army Area Centres, Y.M.C.A.
- Richard Dawson Bates, Honorary Secretary, Graigavon Hospital for Neurasthenics
- The Reverend Basil Staunton Batty, Chairman, London Diocesan Committee for work in Munition Centres
- Agneta Frances Beauchamp, Manager, Red Cross Refreshment Station, Salonika
- Lieutenant-Colonel Charles Thornhill Bell, Assistant Inspector, Trench Warfare Stores, Ministry of Munitions
- Arthur Henry Bennett, Executive Officer, Borough of Leicester Food Control Committee
- Ethel Van Bergen, Commandant and Donor of Auxiliary Hospital, Attingham, Shrewsbury
- Ethel Jean Bevan, Honorary Secretary, Stoke Newington and Hackney Local War Pensions Sub-Committee
- Edith Lindsay, Lady Selby-Bigge, Organiser of Y.W.C.A. Munition Girls' Canteens and Hostels
- Harold William Meares Binney, Chief Commissariat Officer and Deputy Director, Middlesex Branch, Joint V.A. Organisation, British Red Cross and Order of St. John
- Matthew Stevenson Birkett, Assistant Controller, General Statistical Branch, Ministry of Munitions
- Pearl Hall Bishop, Organiser and Commandant, Oakden Auxiliary Hospital and Annexe, Rainhill, West Lancashire
- Owen Vincent Blake, Chief Accountant, Foreign Office and Ministry of Blockade
- Captain Stanley Blythen, Deputy Controller, Registration, East Midland Region, Ministry of National Service
- Alfred Watson Booth, Managing Director, Messrs. J. Booth & Sons, Rodley, Leeds
- Albert William Borthwick Forestry Advisory Officer, Board of Agriculture for Scotland
- George Menteth Boughey, Principal Clerk, Medical Services Division, Ministry of Pensions
- Captain Henry Frank Bourdeaux, Assistant Submarine Superintendent, Post Office, Engineering Department
- William Korff Bowen, Trinity House
- Mary, Lady Bradford, Lady Helper, Surgical Divisions, Nos. 24 and 26 General Hospitals, British Expeditionary Force
- Edward Murray Brand, Paymaster, Royal Arsenal, Woolwich
- The Honourable Maude Helena Brassey, Vice-President, Oxfordshire Branch of the British Red Cross Society, and Donor and Commandant of the Chipping Norton Auxiliary Hospital
- The Reverend Edwin James Brechin, Late General Superintendent for France, Scottish Churches Huts
- Edgcumbe Bendle Brighten, Director of Printing, Ministry of Food
- Edith Broadmead, County of Somerset Voluntary Help Association
- The Honorable Diana Isabel Brougham, Staff Commandant and Assistant Head of Military Department, Joint Women's Voluntary Aid Detachment, Department, British Red Cross and Order of St. John
- Marion Bruce, Registrar and Organiser of Timberhurst Auxiliary Hospital, Bury, East Lancashire
- Major Henry du Buisson, Old Comrades Association, British Red Cross Society
- Ralph Bullock MBE Divisional Commander, Metropolitan Special Constabulary
- Major George Purvis Bulman, Deputy Chief Inspector (Engines), Aircraft Inspection Department, Ministry of Munitions
- Christiana Mary Burchardt, County Secretary, Oxfordshire Branch, British Red Cross Society
- The Honourable Emily Dunbar Burns
- Percy Dale Bussell, Acting Assistant Director of Navy Contracts, Admiralty
- Frances Mary Buxton, Wounded and Missing Enquiry Department, British Red Cross Society
- Margaret Dorothy Byron, Commandant of the Women's Detachment of the London Ambulance Column, City of London Branch, British Red Cross Society
- Laurence John Cadbury, Officer in Charge of Transport, Friends' Ambulance Unit, Dunkirk, France
- Reginald Colin Calder, Establishment Offices, Ministry of Information
- Archibald Charles Campbell, Vice-Chairman of the British Chamber of Commerce, Genoa; Member of the Patriotic League of Britons Overseas
- Mary Gertrude Campion, Commandant of Voluntary Aid Detachments, Rouen Area, France
- Mabel Barclay, Lady Cantlie, Red Cross Organiser, Division of Marylebone, County of London Branch, British Red Cross Society
- Thomas Henry Towler Case, Treasury Solicitor's Department
- Kenneth Edlmann Chalmers, Vice-Chairman, Kent Local War Pensions Committee
- George Tanner Chivers, Head Master, Dockyard School, Portsmouth
- Harold Thomas Clarke, Head of Statistical Section, Commercial Branch, Ministry of Shipping
- Edith Maud Cliff, Commandant, Gledhow Hall Auxiliary Hospital, Leeds
- Major Lewis St. John Rawlinson Clutterbuck, Inspector, Technical Division of Filled and Empty Shell, Woolwich Arsenal
- Blair Onslow Cochrane, County Director, Auxiliary Hospitals and Voluntary Aid Detachments, Isle of Wight
- William Henry Cockeram, Principal District Officer, Board of Trade Survey Staff
- Albert Edward Cocks, Naval Store Officer, H.M. Dockyard, Devonport
- Arthur William Codd, Chief Cartographer, Hydrographic Department, Admiralty
- Harold William Cole MBE Executive Officer, Road Transport Board
- Charles Henry Colson, Superintending Civil Engineer, Civil Engineer in Chief's Department, Admiralty
- Cornelius Combridge JP Chairman of Birmingham War Savings Committee
- Kenneth Cookson, Commandant, British Red Cross Motor Ambulance, Convoy No. 3, Italy
- Charlotte Leonora, Lady Cooper, Commandant of City of London Voluntary Aid Detachment No. 10
- Percy Fullerton Corkhill, Secretary to the Lord Mayor of Liverpool
- Richard Corless, Superintendent of Instruments, Meteorological Office
- Frederick Costello, Chairman of Hull Local Food Control Committee
- Reginald Sydney Courtney, Deputy Director of Purchases, British War Mission in U.S.A.
- Lieutenant Aedan Cox, Secretary to the Irish Recruiting Council
- George Cribbes, Proprietor, Beaver Hall Works
- Maxwell Arthur Crosbie, Head of Machinery Department, Messrs. Boots & Company
- Cuthbert Crowley, Secretary, Kitchener House Club for Wounded Soldiers and Sailors, British Red Cross Society
- William Crowther JP Chairman of the Employers' Federation for the Woollen Trade
- Zella Evelyn Leather Culley, Vice-President, Alnwick Division, Northumberland Branch, British Red Cross Society
- Thomas Curr, Engineer and Manager, South Metropolitan Gas Company
- Major Phillip Arthur Curry, Director of Embarkation Department, New York Office, Ministry of Shipping
- Mabel Jane Cutbush, Organiser and Commandant, Rosslyn-Auxiliary Hospital, Hampstead
- Maud Anne David, Honorary Secretary, Cardiff Division', Soldiers' and Sailors' Families Association
- George Davidson, Genoa
- Edwin Harold Davies, General Distribution Branch, Coal Mines Department, Board of Trade
- Thomas Davies, Managing Director, Messrs. T. Davies and Sons Limited
- Florence Mary Davis, Nurses' Department, British Red Cross Society
- Captain Kenneth Randall Davis, Secretary, Birmingham Small Arms Company Limited
- Francis Herbert Mountjoy Nelson Humphrey-Davy, British War Mission in U.S.A.
- Marion Disraeli, Vice-President of the Wycombe and Desborough Division, Buckinghamshire Branch, British Red Cross Society
- Colonel George Cadell Dobbs, Honorary Secretary, Irish Branch, Incorporated Soldiers' and Sailors' Help Society
- Robert Doncaster JP Chairman, Shardlow Rural District Council
- Lieutenant-Commander Charles Edward Down RNR Master, Mercantile Marine; Marine-Superintendent, Royal Mail Steam Packet Company
- William Henry Milverton Drake, Secretary, Headquarters Y.M.C.A., Workers' Department
- James Dunn Dunn, Commercial Assistant, Ministry of Shipping
- Nora Kathleen Durler, Joint Commandant, Wardown Auxiliary Hospital, Luton
- William Pelham Eastham, District Superintendent;, Trinity House, London
- William Stanley Edmonds MBE For services to the Egyptian Expeditionary Force
- George Edwards JP Vice-President, National Agricultural Labourers' and Rural Workers' Union; Workers' Representative on the Agricultural Wages Board; Member of the Norfolk District Wages Committee
- Archibald Sefton Elford MBE Temporary Assistant, Military Sea Transport Branch, Ministry of Shipping
- Alexander Macbeth Elliot Headquarters Medical Examiner, British Red Cross Society
- Major-General Philip Mackay Ellis, County Director, Auxiliary Hospitals and Voluntary Aid Detachments, Carnarvonshire
- Minnie Enness, Red Cross Work, Egypt
- James Johnstone Esplen, Director, Technical Department, British Ministry of Shipping in U.S.A.
- George Hammond Etherton, Town Clerk, Portsmouth; Executive Officer, Portsmouth Food Control Committee
- John Taylor Ewen, H.M. Inspector of Schools; Secretary, Aberdeen Munitions Board of Management
- Flora Emily Fardell, Honorary Secretary, Education Committee, Officers' Families Fund
- Hugh Richard Farren JP Chairman, Coventry Local War Pensions Committee
- Alfred Cornwall Ferguson Commandant and Medical Officer, Thirsk Auxiliary Hospital, Yorkshire
- Engineer-Commander Anthony Ferguson RNR Chief Engineer of the Transport Olympic
- Louis Ferguson, Senior Partner and Managing Director, Messrs. Ferguson Bros., Ltd., Port Glasgow
- William Fife, Senior Partner, Messrs. W. Fife & Sons
- David John Finlayson MBE Chief Accountant, British Red Cross Society
- George Edgar Foot, Superintending Clerk, Accountant General's Department, Admiralty
- Arthur Charles Forbes, Chief Forestry Inspector, Department of Agriculture and Technical Instruction for Ireland; Assistant Controller of Timber Supplies for Ireland
- Colonel Everard Allen Ford, Founder and Commandant, London Diocesan Church Lads' Brigade
- John James Forster, Carlisle Citizens' League, British Red Cross Society
- Robert John Foster, Local Director, Peterborough Flax Centre, Board of Agriculture and Fisheries
- Margaret Mary Maitland Fowler, Vice-President, Atherstone Division, Warwickshire Branch, British Red Cross Society; Commandant, Weddington Hall Auxiliary Hospital
- Florence Fraser, Commandant, Massandra Auxiliary Hospital, Weymouth
- Hamilton Fulton, Managing Director, Messrs. Martinsyde, Limited
- Henry John Edward Garcia MBE Superintending Inspector of Taxes, Inland Revenue
- William George, Town Clerk, Invergordon
- Henry Gibbs, Technical Wool Officer, War Office
- Charles Stanley Gibson, Adviser, Chemical Warfare Department, Ministry of Munitions
- Edwin Gillett, Principal Clerk, Legal Department, Board of Trade
- Thomas Richard Gleghorn, Secretary, Central Iron Ore Committee, Ministry of Munitions
- Edward Goldsmith MBE Divisional Commander, Metropolitan Special Constabulary
- Alfred Gollin MBE Divisional Commander, Metropolitan Special Constabulary
- John Good, Assistant Controller, Gun Ammunition Manufacture Department, Ministry of Munitions
- Clarence Noel Goodall, Managing Director, Messrs. Robert Stephenson & Co., Ltd.
- The Honourable Henrietta Margaret Goodenough, Soldiers' and Sailors' Families' Association, Soldiers' and Sailors' Help Society, and Royal Patriotic Fund, Portsmouth
- Robert Vaughan Gower MBE Mayor of Tunbridge Wells
- Mary Bremner Graham, Borough of Scarborough Association of Voluntary Workers
- Olivia Mary Greer, Organiser of Red Cross Work Rooms, Dublin; late Commandant of Lady Dudley's Hospital for Officers, Bournemouth
- John Temperley Grey MRCS LRCP Donor and Medical Officer, Stanmore House Auxiliary Hospital, Lenham
- Lieutenant-Colonel James Grimwood DSO Acting Principal Clerk, War Office
- Catherine Gurney, Founder of the International Christian Police Association, and of Convalescent Homes and Orphanages for Police at Brighton, Redhill, and Harrogate
- George Francis Hambly, Deputy Assistant Director of Army Contracts
- John James William Handford, Assistant Secretary and Chief Accountant, Board of Agriculture for Scotland
- John Rudge Harding, Secretary, Auxiliary Home Hospitals Department, British Red Cross Society
- Arthur Hobson Hardisty, Member of Huddeirsfield Board of Management; General Manager and Honorary Secretary of a National Shell Factory
- Henry Harrison MC Area Recruiting Organiser in Ireland
- David Allan Hay, Honorary Secretary, Glasgow Branch, Soldiers' and Sailors' Families Association
- Frederick William Hayne, Chairman of the Central Committee of the Overseas Club; Founder of the Patriotic League of Britons Overseas
- Mary Elizabeth Hedley, Vice-President, North Riding of Yorkshire Branch, British Red Cross Society; Administrator and Donor of Hospital at Middlesbrough
- Eveleen Mary Henderson, Vice-President of Leatherhead Division, Surrey Branch, British Red Cross Society; Commandant of Red House Auxiliary Hospital, Surrey
- Henry Leslie Hendriks, Chief Staff Officer, City of London Police Special Reserve
- Alice Helen Henry, Organiser and Head of Sphagnum Moss Department, Irish War Hospital Supply Depot, British Red Cross Society
- Elliot Dunville Hewan, Director, Oil Department, New York Office
- William Hibberdine, Traffic Manager, Eastern Telegraph Company
- Mary Hiley, Commandant, Sleaford Auxiliary Hospital, South Lincolnshire
- Edith Cairns Hindley, Organising Area Secretary for Y.W.C.A. in Boulogne Area
- Captain Lewis Hoad, Master of Cable Ship, Telconia
- Walter Edward Hobbs, Controller of Supplies, Ministry of National Service
- Gideon Hobden, Manager of Jack's Palace, British and Foreign Sailors' Society
- Edward Highton Hodgson, Committee Clerk, Customs and Excise
- John Ewer Jefferson Hogg DL JP Assistant Director of National Service, West London and District Area
- Robert Wolstenholme Holland Honorary Civil Liabilities Commissioner, Monmouthshire
- Frederick Holt, Chemist, The Castner-Kellner Alkali Company Limited
- Frances Jane, Lady Homer, Organiser of Y.M.C.A. Munitions Canteens in North London
- Ernest Charles Horton, President of the Home Timber Section of the Timber Federation; Member of Advisory Committee to Timber Controller
- Charles Marshall Hourston, Assistant Controller, Factory Audit and Costs Department, Ministry of Munitions
- Agnes Maud Hulme, Lady Superintendent, H.R.H. Princess Victoria's Rest Club, Calais
- John Herbert Hunt, District Secretary, Y.M.C.A., First Army Area
- Bertha Huth, for services to the Incorporated Soldiers and Sailors Help Society
- Katharine Anne Hyde, Donor and Commandant, Wharmton Towers Auxiliary Hospital, Greenfield, Yorkshire
- Mariette Isaacs, Commandant of Queen's Gate Auxiliary Hospital, London
- John Hier Jacob, Acting Principal Clerk, Public Trustee Office
- Frederick Ernest James, District Secretary, Y.M.C.A., Abbeville
- Mary Johnson, Hull and East Riding of Yorkshire Association of Voluntary Workers
- Robert William Johnstone FRCS Commissioner of Medical Services, Ministry of National Service
- Ernest Stephens Jones, Actuary to Pensions Commutation Board
- Samuel Glynne Jones, Assistant Inspector, Board of Education
- Henry Joy, Assistant Controller, Post Office Savings Bank Department
- Mary Lees Kay, Vice-President of the Middlewich Division, Cheshire Branch, British Red Cross Society; Administrator, Brunner Mond Club Hospital, Middlewich
- Reginald Heber Keatinge, Honorary Secretary, "Our Day," Ireland
- William Foord-Kelcey, Professor of Mathematics and Mechanics, Royal Military Academy
- William Thomas Kendall, Chief Engineer of the Transport Khiva
- John Macfarlane Kennedy, Superintendent, Government Rolling Mills, Ministry of Munitions
- Martha Kerr, Lady Superintendent, Y.M.C.A. Naval Institute, Rosyth
- Muriel Constance Kerr, Stores Headquarters Staff, British Red Cross Society
- Augustus Charles Edmund Kimber
- Alice Cicell King, Commandant, New Court Auxiliary Hospital, Cheltenham
- Henry Smails King MBE Assistant Army Auditor, Egyptian Expeditionary Force
- William Frederick King, Assistant Controller, Munitions Accounts, Ministry of Munitions
- Ethel Corbet Knight, Organising Secretary in France for Y.W.C.A. Recreation Huts
- Christine Knowles, British Prisoners of War Food Parcels and Clothing Fund, British Red Cross Society
- Manouk Kouyoumdjian, Late British Consular Agent, Philippopolis
- Annie Macpherson Laurie, Vice-President, Weymouth Division, Dorsetshire Branch, British Red Cross Society
- Samuel Chetwynd Leech, Civil Liabilities Commissioner for Camberwell
- Luciert Alphonse Legros, Chief Technical Assistant, Dilution Section, Ministry of National Service
- Colonel Henry Lewis JP DL
- John Lewis, Chief Engineer, Mercantile Marine
- Margaret Blanche Lewis, Senior Organising Officer, Employment Department, Ministry of Labour
- Colonel Charles Linton, County Director, Auxiliary Hospitals and Voluntary Aid Detachments, Huntingdonshire
- William Locke, Clerk in Charge of Accounts, H.M. Office of Works
- Frederick Charles Lohden, Standard Ship Branch, Ministry of Shipping
- Lieutenant Edward Ernest Long, Deputy Controller, Oriental Department, Ministry of Information
- Lieutenant-Colonel Llewellyn Wood Longstaff, Vice-President and Assistant County Director, Wimbledon Division, Surrey Branch, British Red Cross Society (to date from 1 November 1918)
- Mary Sophia Loudon, Joint Commandant, Christchurch Auxiliary Hospital, Hampshire
- John Reuben Lunn FRCS Commandant, "The Cecils" Auxiliary Hospital Chappell Croft, Sussex
- Mary Fownes Luttrell, Vice-President, Williton, District, Somersetshire Branch, British Red Cross Society; Organiser of Red Cross Hospital, Minehead, Somersetshire
- Hugh Allan Macewen Medical Inspector, Local Government Board
- James Colquhoun Macfarlane, Manager, Howitzer Shop, Messrs. Wm Beardmore & Co., Ltd.
- Lauchlan Grant McFarlane, Assistant Manager, Messrs. Cammell, Laird & Company, Birkenhead
- Malcolm Macfarlane, Assistant Director of Finance, Ministry of Food
- Margaret Annie Kay McGrigor, Vice-President, Stirlingshire Branch, Scottish Branch, British Red Cross Society
- The Honourable Robert Donald McKenzie, Wounded and Missing Enquiry Department, Havre, British Red Cross Society
- Captain John Reid McLean MBE JP Divisional Commander, Metropolitan Special Constabulary
- James Hamish MacMurray, Manager, Imperial Bank of Persia, Hamadan
- Major Wallace John McNab, Purchasing Department, British War Mission in U.S.A.
- Robert Henry Maconochie, Recruiting Department, Ministry of National Service
- Captain James Macoun, Chief Executive Officer, Irish Food Control Committee
- Captain Douglas Ross Macphail, Assistant Director of Contracts, Royal Commission on Wheat Supplies
- Thomas MacPherson, Local Purchasing Officer, Egyptian Expeditionary Force
- Frances Helen Macqueen, Honorary Secretary, Aberdeen War Dressings Depot
- Elsie Trant MacSwinney, Staff Commandant, Motor and Training Departments, Joint Women's Voluntary Aid Detachment, Department, British Red Cross and Order of St. John
- Kate Manley, Woman Inspector of Domestic Subjects under the Board of Education; Organiser of National Kitchens
- Edith Lindsay Manning, Head of Surgical Department, Queen Mary's Needlework Guild
- Edmund George Marlow, Assistant Controller, Munitions Accounts, Ministry of Munitions
- Alan Herbert Marquand, Head of the Liner Shipment Section, Commercial Branch, Ministry of Shipping
- Philip Edward Marrack, Assistant Principal, Secretary's Department, Admiralty
- Captain Arthur Timothy Marshall, Assistant Secretary, Department of Controller-General of Merchant Shipbuilding, Admiralty
- William Lee Marshall, Member of Special Grants Committee, Ministry of Pensions
- Dudley Christopher Maynard, Architect of the Queen's Auxiliary Hospital, Frognal, Foot's Cray, Kent
- Olga Mosley Mayne, Worker in the Soldiers' Club at Arquata, Italy
- Major Robert Hobart Mayo, Section Director, Aircraft Technical Department, Ministry of Munitions
- Henry Arthur Measor, Trinity House
- Benjamin Measures JP Farmer
- Frederick Alan Van der Meulen, Finance Department, War Office
- William Aberdein Middleton, Inspector of Audit, Insurance Audit Department
- William Miles, Section Director, Agricultural Machinery Department, Ministry of Munitions
- Ellen Cameron Miller, Red Cross Work, Egypt
- Irene Helen Miller, Vice-President, Rugby Division, Warwickshire Branch, British Red Cross Society
- George Torrance Milne, Trade Commissioner
- Albert Ernest Mitchell, Accounting Officer and Chief Clerk, Central Control Board (Liquor Traffic)
- William Henry Morgan, Director of Stores Department, Order of St. John of Jerusalem in England
- Captain William Roger Morison, Master of the Transport Princess Victoria
- Cynthia Gertrude Morris, The Rifle Brigade Prisoners of War Fund
- Miriam Louise Moseley, Honorary Secretary, Radnorshire Association of Voluntary Workers
- Mary Florence Edith, Baroness Mostyn, Commandant and Donor, Mostyn Convalescent Home, Holywell, Flint
- Annie Bertha Mudie, Queen Mary's Needlework Guild
- Catherine Miller-Mundy, Vice-President, Ilkeston Division, Derbyshire Branch, British Red Cross Society
- Archibald Murchie, Superintending Accountant for France, Y.M.C.A.
- Ivor Percy Nicholson, Officer in Charge of Periodicals, Ministry of Information
- Henry Kingscote Nisbet, General Inspector, Local Government Board
- Captain Lionel Edward Close Norbury FRCS Surgeon, British Red Cross Hospital, Netley
- Percy George Norman, Headquarters Accountant, Y.M.C.A.
- Walter Arthur Northam, General Manager, Cinematograph Department, Ministry of Information
- May Nuttall, Vice-President, Oldham Division, East Lancashire Branch, British Red Cross Society
- Beatrice Jane O'Brien, Head of the Sphagnum Moss Branch, Irish Women's Hospital Supply Depot
- James Rodney O'Donnell, Assistant Secretary to Irish Food Control Committee
- Arthur Maule Oliver, Town Clerk, Newcastle upon Tyne; Honorary Executive Officer, Newcastle Food Control Committee; Chief Executive Officer, Tyneside Advisory Food Committee
- Herbert Charles O'Neill, Officer-in-charge of Scandinavian Section, Ministry of Information
- Harriet Katharine Onslow, Royal Naval Division Comforts Fund
- Eugénie Josephine Oudin MBE Private Secretary to Adjutant-General
- Captain Walter Benjamin Palmer, Master of the Transport Kaiser-I-Hind
- George Pate, Managing Director, The Carron Company; Member, Edinburgh Munitions Board of Management
- Engineer Commander George Patterson RNR Chief Engineer of the Transport Aquitania
- William Francis Paul JP Donor and Organiser, Broadwater Auxiliary Hospital
- Charles Child Pearson, British Ministry of Food in U.S.A.
- Margaret Catharine Peck, Borough of Folkestone Voluntary Workers' Association
- The Reverend Howard Nasmith Perrin, Donor and Administrator, Runcorn Auxiliary Hospital
- William Littlejohn Phillip JP Joint Managing Director, Messrs. Spencer & Company Limited
- John Robert Phillips, Examiner, Accountant-General's Department, Post Office
- Major Samuel Renny Pinkney TD Assistant Director, Ship Purchase Section, Ministry of Shipping
- The Honourable Mary Olivia de la Poer, Organiser, Tipperary War Hospital Supply Depot, British Red Cross Society
- Margaret Joyce Powell, Secretary to Dentral Agricultural Advisory Council
- Lady Beatrice Adina Pretyman, Donor, Orwell Park Auxiliary Hospital
- John Quayle, Chief Engineer, Mercantile Marine
- Ernest Barkley Raikes, County Secretary, Norfolk Branch, British Red Cross Society
- John Maclean Ramsay, Superintendent of Statistics, Board of Agriculture for Scotland
- Alexander Oliver Rankine Chief Research Assistant, Admiralty Experimental Station, Harwich
- Ralph George Joynson Rawlinson MBE Divisional Commander, Metropolitan Special Constabulary
- Harry Thomas Reading, District Superintendent, Trinity House, Yarmouth
- Major David Valentine Rees TD LRCP MRCS Operating Surgeon, Brecon and Builth Auxiliary Hospitals
- Joseph Cook Rees, Commandant of Transport, Neath District, British Red Cross Society
- Charles Reid CM Deputy County Director, Staffordshire Branch, British Red Cross Society
- Katherine Alice Ricardo, Joint Commandant, Christchurch Auxiliary Hospital
- Fabian Arthur Besant Rice, Executive Officer, Brighton Food Control Committee
- Harry Richardson, Executive Officer, Birmingham Food Control Committee
- Arthur Henry Riseley MBE Secretary, Ministry of National Service, South Western Region
- Edith Mary Roads, Controller of Typists, War Office
- John McLorinan Robb, Superintending Engineer-in-Charge of South Midland District, General Post Office
- Edward Coleridge Roberts MRCS JP Senior Medical Officer, Grovelands Auxiliary Hospital, Southgate, Middlesex
- Katharine Haigh Robinson, Commandant, University Auxiliary Hospital, Oxford
- Thomas Robinson JP Bradford Dyers' Association
- John Henry Rogers, Honorary Secretary and Treasurer, Birmingham Joint Voluntary Aid Detachment, Committee, British Red Cross Society
- Ambrose Rollin, Cashier, H.M. Dockyard, Devonport
- Frederick Alexander Ross, Manager, Messrs. Morgan Grenfell and Company
- Bessie Rose Row, General Service Superintendent, Devonshire Branch, British Red Cross Society
- Clementina Elizabeth Hope Rowcliffe, Vice-President, Cranleigh Division, Surrey Branch, British Red Cross Society; Commandant of Oaklands Auxiliary Hospital
- Henry Snowden Rowell, Deputy Director, Department of Deputy Controller of Armament Production, Admiralty
- Anne Emily, Dowager Duchess of Roxburghe, President, Haddingtonshire Branch, Scottish Branch, British Red Cross Society
- The Honourable Eustace Scott Hamilton-Russell, Commandant, Brancepeth Castle Auxiliary Hospital, Durham
- Herbert Ryle, Assistant Architect, First Class, H.M. Office of Works
- Stella Fanny Safford, Lady Superintendent, H.R.H. Princess Victoria's Rest Club, Camiers
- The Honourable Lockhart Matthew St. Clair CIE MBE Divisional Commander, Metropolitan Special Constabulary
- David Alexander Stewart Sandeman, Ministry of Munitions
- Eleanor Mary Caroline, Viscountess Sandhurst
- George William Saunders MBE Commercial Assistant, Requisition Branch, Ministry of Shipping
- Joseph Sayers, Superintendent at one of H.M. Factories, Ministry of Munitions
- William Farrar Scholfield, Acting Principal Clerk, H.M. Office of Works
- Adam Scott, District Secretary, Y.M.C.A., Étaples
- John Bridson Seatie, War Office
- Prideaux George Selby MRCS LRCP Medical Officer, Auxiliary Hospital, Sittingbourne, Kent
- Julia Perronet Sells, Queen Mary's Needlework Guild
- William Fry Shannon, Second Assistant Director of Finance, Ministry of Pensions
- George Ernest Shaw, Civil Assistant, Directorate of Prisoners of War, War Office
- Gwendoline Mary Shaw, Honorary Secretary, Mayoress's War Hospital Supply Depot, Ipswich
- Walter Henry Shepperd, Acting Paymaster, Army Pay Department
- Violet Mary Siltzer, Stores Department, Headquarters Staff, British Red Cross Society
- Captain James Sim, Master of the Ambulance Transport Warilda
- Captain Stanley Hall Simmons, Master of the Transport Chagres
- Richard Arbuthnot Samson MBE Divisional Commander, Metropolitan Special Constabulary
- James Edward Singleton, Sub-Inspector, Board of Education; Honorary Secretary, Cumberland County Committee for War Savings
- Percy Henry Smart Sitters, District Secretary, Y.M.C.A., Calais-Dunkirk Area
- James Buteux Skeggs, Town Clerk, Poplar; Clerk to the Local Tribunal and Honorary Secretary to the Local Representative Committee
- James Cameron Smail MBE Organiser of Trade Schools under the Education Committee of the London County Council; District Manager, Metropolitan Munitions Committee
- Elsie Mary Small, Commandant, Southwell Auxiliary Hospital; Nottinghamshire
- Frances Mary Smith, Commandant, Billingboro Auxiliary Hospital, South Lincolnshire
- Captain Frederick Crawford Smith, Officer-in-Charge, Base Ambulance Convoys, British Red Cross Society, Boulogne
- Marshall Bang Smith, Trinity House
- Sarah Helen Smith, Commandant, Priory Auxiliary Hospital, Cheltenham
- Thomas Smith JP
- Wilfrid Guy Spear MBE Acting Superintending Clerk, Accountant General's Department, Admiralty
- William Blatspiel Stamp, Divisional Commander, City of London Police Special Reserve
- James Stark JP Cupar and District Voluntary Workers' Association
- Isabel Margaret Stedman, Assistant, French Section, Ministry of Information
- Philippa Anna Frederica Stephenson, Essex Regiment Prisoners of War Fund
- Alexandrina Ryrie Steward, Wiltshire Prisoners of War Committee
- John Stewart, Executive Officer, City of Edinburgh Food Control Committee
- John Northover Stickland, Late Superintending Inspector, Customs and Excise
- George Robert Fabris Stilwell MRCS Medical Officer, Balgowan Auxiliary Hospital, Beckenham, Kent
- Major Arthur Perry Stockings, Director, British Red Cross Stores, Genoa, Italy
- Andrew Denys Stocks, Clerk, Procurator-General's Department
- Irene Mary Stokes, Honorary Secretary, County and City of Dublin Division, Soldiers' and Sailor's Families Association
- John Edward Kynaston Studd, President, Regent Street Polytechnic
- Captain Montagu Wemyss Suart MBE Divisional Commander, Metropolitan Special Constabulary
- Albert James Sylvester MBE Private Secretary to the Secretary to the War Cabinet
- Alexander Thomson Taylor, Chairman, Renfrew Local Food Control Committee
- William Taylor, Chairman and Managing Director, Messrs. Taylor, Taylor and Hobson, Limited
- Lilian Eugenia Tench, The Sailors' and Soldiers' Club, Rome
- Thomas William Thirlwell, Personnel Secretary, Church Army Huts and Centres
- Richard Thirsk, His Britannic Majesty's Consul, Aarhus
- Ivor Craddock Thomas MVO Section Director, Priority Department, Ministry of Munitions
- Maude Tuson Thomas, Commandant, Brondesbury Park Auxiliary Hospital
- George Roger Thompson, Chief Engineer of the Transport Toronto
- Thomas Marson Till, Deputy Controller, Finance Department, Ministry of Information
- Douglas Theodore Timins, Secretary, Munitions War Savings Advisory Committee
- Robert Tinniswood, Assistant Director of Finance, Ministry of Pensions
- Cyprienne Emma Madeleine Hanbury-Tracy, Worker in Canteens and Clubs for British and Italian Troops in Italy
- Captain Alfred William Vincent Trant, Marine Superintendent, Mercantile Movements Division, Admiralty
- The Honourable Ellinor Trotter, Stores Department, Headquarters Staff, British Red Cross Society
- Lucinda Elizabeth Alexandra Tubbs, Commandant, Albion House Auxiliary Hospital, Newbury, Berkshire
- George Turner JP Chairman, Cambridge Local Tribunal
- Samuel Thomas Turner, Inspector of Munitions Areas, Sheffield
- William Ernest Stephen Turner Secretary, Society of Glass Technology; Head of Department of Glass Technology at Sheffield University
- Helena Augusta Mary Turpin, Voluntary Worker, Hospital Bag Fund
- John Urie, Section Director, Contracts Department, Ministry of Munitions
- Janet Feliza Vaughan, Vice-President, Taunton District, Somersetshire Branch, British Red Cross Society, and Organiser of Priory Schools Auxiliary Hospital, Taunton
- Caroline Emily Venables, Commandant, Highland Moors Auxiliary Hospital, Llandrindod Wells
- Constance Waggett, Honorary Head Lady, Church Army Hut Workers in France
- Richard Wake, Section Director, Small Arms and Machine Guns Department, Ministry of Munitions
- Roger Donald Waters, Assistant Director of Inland Construction, Department of the Administrator of Works and Buildings, Air Ministry
- William Edward Watkins, Secretary to the Education Committee of the Local Education Authority, County Council of East Suffolk
- Dorothy Bannerman Watson, District Secretary, British Red Cross Society, and Commandant, Clifford Street Auxiliary Hospital, York
- Major Douglas Home Watson, Regional Recorder, Ministry of National Service, London and South-Eastern Region
- Edith Deverell Watson, Lady Superintendent, H.R.H. Princess Victoria's Club for Nurses, Wirnereux
- Lieutenant-Colonel Myers Wayman, District Director, Appointments Department, Ministry of Labour
- George Webster, Late Secretary, now Member, Rochdale Munitions Board of Management
- George Coulson Welborn, Official Ore Broker, Commercial Branchy, Ministry of Shipping
- James Laurence Wells, Orgauising Secretary for War Savings, Glasgow
- Florence Ffaith Hastings-Wheler, Donor and Commandant, Ledston Hall Auxiliary Hospital, Castleford, Yorkshire
- Annie Whiller, Salvation Army
- Beatrice Whitbread, Wounded and Missing Enquiry Department, British Red Cross Society
- George Whittaker
- William de Burgh Whyte, Deputy Director of Production, British War Mission in U.S.A.
- William Edward Whyte, Clerk to the Middle Ward District Committee, Hamilton
- Captain John Wilkins, Master, Mercantile Marine
- Charles Williams, Late Honorary Secretary and Chief Executive Officer, Northumberland War Agricultural Executive Committee
- Harris Gregory Williams, Assistant to General Manager, Messrs. Armstrong and Company, Newcastle
- William Nance Williams, Technical Adviser on Wages, Labour Regulation Department, Ministry of Munitions
- Lieutenant-Colonel Michael Williamson, Area Recruiting Organiser in Ireland
- Edith Wilmot, Assistant County Director, Devonshire Branch, British Red Cross Society
- Charlotte Mary Wilson, Oxford and Bucks Prisoners of War Fund
- David Wilson, General Distribution Branch, Coal Mines Department, Board of Trade
- Helena Jane Wilson, Commandant, Chippenham Auxiliary Hospital, Wiltshire
- Captain Henry Adrian Fitzroy Wilson, Secretary and Registrar, British Red Cross- Hospital, Netley
- Richard William Wilson, Chief Secretary, Salvation Army's Work amongst the Troops in the United Kingdom
- Agnes Rankine Winram, Honorary Secretary Fund for British' Soldiers interned in Germany
- George Mitchell Winter JP MRCS LRCP Chairman, Torquay Food Control Committee
- Evelyn Emma Amelia Wren, Late Vice-President, Lexden-Winstree Division, Essex Branch, British Red Cross Society
- John Brown Wright, Deputy Director of Cheese Supplies, Ministry of Food
- The Reverend Basil Alfred Yeaxlee, Secretary, Universities Committee, Y.M.C.A.

British India

- John Harold Abbott, Jhansi, United Provinces
- H.H Dr. Rai Rajeshwar Bali Taluqdar - Rampur Dariyabad, Honorary Magistrate, Barabanki, Minister of Education & Health United Provinces
- Frederick Henry Addis VD Carriage and Wagon Superintendent, Bombay, Baroda and Central India Railway
- Captain Alfred Stevenson Balfour, Royal Indian Marine, aide-de-camp to Governor of Madras
- The Reverend Major George Dunsford Barne, Principal; Lawrence Military Asylum, Sanawar
- Arthur Morton Bell, Carriage and Wagon Superintendent, Great Indian Peninsular Railway
- James William Best, Deputy Conservator of Forests, Hoshangabad, Central Provinces
- Clement Ayerst Beyts, Indian Civil Service, Collector, Ahmednagar, Bombay
- Mabel, Lady Bingley, Member of the Council of the Simla-Delhi Red Cross Work Party
- The Reverend James Black, Chaplain, St. Andrew's Kirk, Simla, Punjab
- George Blackstock, Managing Director, Messrs. Rowe & Co, Burma
- Harold Branford, Manager, Carpet Factory, Mirzapur, United Provinces
- Major Philip William Lilian Broke-Smith DSO Royal Engineers, officiating A.C.R.E., Peshawar, North-West Frontier Province
- Arthur Cecil Brown, Agent, Bank of Bengal, Dacca
- John Arthur Evans Burrup ISO Customs Department, Calcutta
- Rao Bahadur Choudhri Lai Chand, Pleader, Rohtak, Punjab
- Rai Bahadur Lala Karam Chanel MBE Banker, Peshawar
- Alfred James Chase, Locomotive Superintendent, North-Western Railway
- Major Richard Henry Chenevix-Trench, First Assistant to Agent to the Governor-General, Baluchistan
- Marmaduke Robert Coburn, Deputy Controller, War Accounts
- Lieutenant Godfrey Ferdinando Stratford Collins, Indian Army Reserve of Officers, Recruiting Officer, Kirkee, Bombay
- Thomas Fothergill Cooke, Superintendent of Police, Hissar, Punjab
- Robert Mansneld Cowley VD Traffic Manager, East Indian Railway
- Maud Lilian Davys, Laboratory Assistant, Kasauli, Punjab
- Rani Chandelin Ju Deo, Rampura, United Provinces
- Lieutenant-Commander Henry Aloysius Bruno Digby-Beste, Royal Indian Marine
- John Collard Bernard Drake, Indian Civil Service, Magistrate and Deputy Collector, Ranchi, Bihar and Orissa
- Kate Hannah Ellis, Madras
- Aline Elwes, Honorary Work Secretary of Ladies' Depot of Madras War Fund, Madras
- Lieutenant Keith Grahame Feiling, Royal Scots Fusiliers, Secretary, Central Recruiting Board
- Second Lieutenant John Alexander Ferguson, Indian Civil Service, Registrar, Chief Court, Punjab
- Major Michael Lloyd Ferrar, Indian Army, Postal Censor, Bombay
- Robert Loraine Gamlen, Master of His Exalted Highness the Nizam's Mint, Hyderabad
- James Ainsworth Gilbert, Bank of Bengal, Calcutta
- Marie Girard, Bengal
- Engineer Lieutenant-Commander James William Mineard Godden, Royal Indian Marine, Engineer in Charge of Factory, Bombay Dockyard
- Mary Hannyngton, Indian Soldiers' Fund
- Major Thomas Guy Marriott Harris, Indian Army, Political Department, Assistant Political Agent, Kalat, Baluchistan
- Robert Hemiss Handasyd Hopkins, Shipping Master, Bombay
- William Stenning Hopkyns, Indian Civil Service, Magistrate and Collector, Mymensingh, Bengal
- Lieutenant-Colonel Francis Dillon Hunt, Army Veterinary Corps, Ahmednagar, Bombay
- Khan Bahadur Muhammad Aziz-ud-Din Husain CIE ISO Madras
- Shaikh Shahid Husain, Barrister-at-Law, Lucknow, United Provinces
- Sidney John Kendrick, Superintendent, Carriage and Wagon Department, East Indian Railway
- Khan Bahadar Nawao Muhammad Muzammilullah Khan, Bhikampur, United Provinces
- Khan Bahadur Arbab Dost Muhammad Khan MBE Takkal Bala, North-West Frontier Province
- Khan Bahadur Malik Muhammad Amin Khan, Shamshabad, Punjab
- Commander George Henry Stransham La Touche, Royal Indian Marine, Deputy Port Officer, Calcutta
- Maxwell Study Leigh, Indian Civil Service, Sub-Divisional Officer, Khushab, Punjab
- Thomas Henry LeMesurier, Secretary, South Indian Railway
- William James Litster, Alliance Bank, Simla
- Major Edward Campbell Loch, Indian Army, Remount Department, Calcutta
- Major Hugh Arthur Lomas, Indian Civil Service, Deputy Commissioner, Almora, United Provinces
- Ethel Luxmore, Secretary, Women's War Work Bureau, Delhi
- Vivian Hardy MacCaw, Kettlewell, Bullen & Co., Calcutta
- Dorothy Maffey, Secretary, Simla-Delhi Red Cross Work Party
- Abdul Majid, Deputy Superintendent of Police, Central Intelligence Department
- Khan Bahadur Ardeshir Dossabhoy Marker, Baluchistan
- Frederick Barclay Martin, Superintendent, Kalabagh-Bannu section, North-Western Railway
- Adeline Mason, Cachar, Assam
- The Reverend James Mathers, Provincial Army Secretary for South India Young Men's Christian Association, Bangalore
- John Fisher McMichael, District Traffic Superintendent, North-Western Railway
- Arthur Wyndham McNair, Indian Civil Service, Magistrate and Collector, United Provinces
- John James Meikle, Superintendent, Government Printing, Calcutta
- Lieutenant-Colonel Hugh Henry Gordon Mitchell, Madras Group, Garrison Artillery
- Captain Wigram Seymour Elliot Money, 22nd Sam Browne's Cavalry; Military Secretary to His Excellency the Governor of Madras
- Captain Claude Emanuel Montefiore, Indian Army, Assam Military Police
- Arthur Mort, Mining Manager, Khost Colliery, Baluchistan
- Horace Charles Mules CSI MVO Chairman, Port Trust, Karachi
- Charles Allan Mumford, Indian Civil Service, Magistrate and Collector, Bulandshahr, United Provinces
- Arthur Edward Nelson, Indian Civil Service, Commissioner of Excise, Central Provinces
- Ralph Oakden, Indian Civil Service, Magistrate and Collector, Aligarh, United Provinces
- Frederick James Page, Locomotive and Carriage Superintendent, Bombay, Baroda and Central India Railway
- Commander Herbert John Paterson, Royal Naval Reserve (retired)
- John Powell, Honorary Magistrate, Rawalpindi Punjab
- Campbell Ward Rhodes, Vice-Consul, Argentine Republic, Calcutta
- Horace Astell Lynn Robinson, Eastern Telegraph Company
- Alexander Rodger, Imperial Forest Service, Burma (Indian Munitions Board)
- Jotindra Nath Roy, Press Censor, Bengal
- George Drury Rudkin, Indian Civil Service, Revenue and Finance Member, Bikaner, Rajputana
- Honorary Second Lieutenant Raja Lokendra Sah, Jagamanpur, United Provinces
- Charles Edward Walker Sands, Superintendent of Police, Bareilly, United Provinces
- Ernest Alexander Scott, Signal Engineer, North-Western Railway, Lahore, Punjab
- Khan Bahadur Sayyid Mahdi Shah, Gojra, Punjab
- Robert Melvin Shelton, Chief Secretary, Young Men's Christian Association, Overseas, Bengal
- Colin Joseph Silvester, Inspector of Munitions, Calcutta
- Helen Simkins, Sibsagar, Assam
- Rai Bahadur Bhaiya Ganga Baksh Singh, Honorary Magistrate, Balrampur, United Provinces
- Sardar Bahadur Gajjan Singh, Pleader, Ludhiana, Punjab
- Raja Parbal Partab Singh, Honorary Magistrate, Eta, wah, United Provinces
- James Algernon Stevens, Chief Collector of Customs, Burma
- Helen Osmer Stewart, War Depot, Calcutta
- Alexander Montagu Stow, Indian Civil Service, Settlement Officer, Jammu and Kashmir State
- Clare Street, Bombay
- Ethel Swaine, Secretary, Ranchi Ladies' Committee of Joint Red Cross and St. John Ambulance Association, Bihar and Orissa
- Rudolph Victor Symons, District Engineer, Great Indian Peninsula Railway, Bombay
- Maung Po Tha, Head Broker, Messrs. Steel Bros., Burma
- Edgar Thompson, Indian Telegraph Department
- Lieutenant-Colonel Frank Stuart Corbitt Thompson Indian Medical Service, Superintendent, Presidency Jail, Bengal
- Reginald Todd, Agent, Madras and Southern Mahratta Railway
- Alice Todhunter, Ladies' Department, Madras War Fund, Madras
- John Walker Tomb, Chief Sanitary Officer, Asansol Mines Board of Health, Bengal
- Digby Bruce Trevor, Officiating Traffic Manager, North-Western Railway, Lahore
- Lim Chin Tsong, Merchant, Burma
- Commissary and Honorary Major James Wilson Turner, Inspector of Explosives with the Government of India
- Georgina Jean Elizabeth Ure, in charge of Rangoon Department of Comforts for Troops, Burma
- Charles Archibald Walpole, Manager, Anglo-Persian Oil Company, Mohammerah, Persian Gulf
- The Reverend Garfield Williams, Editor, War Journal, United Provinces
- Geoffrey Worsley, Indian Civil Service, Political Assistant and Commandant, B.M.P., Dera Ghazi Khan, Punjab

Egypt

- George Davis Hornblower, Chief Inspector, Public Security
- Major Chudleigh Garvice DSO Commandant of Police, Alexandria
- Frank Cole Madden FRCS Senior Surgeon, Kasr-el-Ainy Hospital
- John Archibald Scott, of Messrs. Richmond, Scott & Co., Alexandria
- Robert Rolo, Banker, Cairo

Sudan

- Major Mervyn James Wheatley, Private Secretary to the Sirdar and Governor-General
- Robert Hewison, Assistant Director of Agriculture
- Arthur James Croft Huddleston, Sudan Civil Service
- Temporary Captain Charles Armine Willis, Assistant Director, Intelligence Department

Honorary Officers

- Hassan Hassib Pasha, Governor of Gharbia Province
- Ali Gemal El Din Pasha, Governor of Menufia Province
- Ibrahim Halim Pasha, Governor of Beheira Province
