= Hefford =

Hefford is a surname. Notable people with the surname include:

- Audrey Hefford (1929–2014), Australian lawn bowler
- Brent Hefford (born 1978), New Zealand cricketer
- Edward Hefford (1871–1955), British Royal Navy officer
- Jayna Hefford (born 1977), Canadian ice hockey player
