= Geoffrey Grasett =

English cricketer

Personal information
- Full name: Geoffrey William Grasett
- Born: 28 July 1890; Hereford, Herefordshire, England
- Died: 31 October 1934 (aged 44); Cranham, Gloucestershire, England
- Batting: Unknown
- Bowling: Unknown

Domestic team information
- Years: Team
- 1912: Oxford University

Career statistics
Competition	First-class
Matches	1
Runs scored	2
Batting average	2.00
100s/50s	–/–
Top score	2*
Balls bowled	72
Wickets	2
Bowling average	17.50
5 wickets in innings	–
10 wickets in match	–
Best bowling	2/19
Catches/stumpings	–/–
- Source: Cricinfo, 9 March 2020

Geoffrey William Grasett OBE (28 July 1890 – 31 October 1934) was an English first-class cricketer and British Army officer.

Grasett was born at Hereford in July 1890. He later studied at Brasenose College, Oxford where he made a single appearance in first-class cricket for Oxford University against H. K. Foster's XI at Oxford in 1912. He took 2 wickets in the match by dismissing Christopher Collier and Cecil Ponsonby in the H. K. Foster's XI first-innings. Grasett was commissioned as a second lieutenant in the Oxford University Contingent of the Officers' Training Corps in March 1912.

He served in the First World War with the Royal Army Service Corps. He was made a temporary lieutenant in May 1915, before being made a temporary captain in November of the same year. He gained the full rank of captain in September 1917. Grasett was made an OBE in the 1919 New Year Honours for services rendered during the war in France and Flanders. By August 1920, he was a temporary major but had relinquished the rank. He was seconded for service with the Territorial Army in November 1930. His health began to deteriorate in 1933, with Grasett being placed on the half–pay list on account of ill health in February. By November of the same year, his health had deteriorated enough for him to be retired on account of his ill health. He died at Cranham, Gloucestershire in October 1934.
