= Christopher Collier =

Christopher Collier may refer to:

- Christopher Collier (cricketer) (1886–1916), English cricketer
- Christopher Collier (historian) (born 1930), American historian and author

== See also ==
- Chris Collier (born 2000), American football player
