= Richard Swann-Mason =

English cricketer and clergyman

Personal information
- Full name: Richard Swann Swann-Mason
- Born: 4 March 1871; Haslingfield, Cambridgeshire, England
- Died: 21 February 1942 (aged 70); St Pancras, London, England
- Batting: Unknown
- Bowling: Unknown

Domestic team information
- Years: Team
- 1896–1908: Cambridgeshire
- 1909–1914: Marylebone Cricket Club

Career statistics
Competition	First-class
Matches	3
Runs scored	67
Batting average	16.75
100s/50s	–/–
Top score	25
Balls bowled	18
Wickets	0
Bowling average	–
5 wickets in innings	–
10 wickets in match	–
Best bowling	–
Catches/stumpings	4/–
- Source: Cricinfo, 21 July 2019

Richard Swann Swann-Mason OBE (4 March 1871 – 21 February 1942) was an English first-class cricketer and clergyman.

Swann-Mason was born in March 1871 in Haslingfield, Cambridgeshire. He was educated at The Perse School, before graduating as a non-collegiate student from the University of Cambridge. After graduating, he became a clergyman in the Anglican Church. He played Minor Counties Cricket for Cambridgeshire from 1896–1908, making 41 appearances in the Minor Counties Championship. He also played first-class cricket for the Marylebone Cricket Club (MCC), debuting in 1909 against Leicestershire at Lord's. Swann-Mason made two further first-class appearances for the MCC, against Leicestershire in 1910, and Cambridge University in 1914. He scored 67 runs in his three first-class matches, with a high score of 25.

He served as a chaplain in the Royal Navy during the First World War, surviving the sinking of HMS Ocean in 1915. For his services during the war, he was made an OBE in the 1919 New Year Honours. Following the war, he served as the vicar of Christ Church, Albany Street until his death at St Pancras in February 1942.
