= Robert Mornement =

English cricketer and Royal Navy surgeon

Surgeon Rear-Admiral Robert Mornement OBE
- Born: Robert Harry Mornement; 5 August 1873; Roudham, Norfolk, England
- Died: 16 April 1948 (aged 74); Chatham, Kent, England
- Cricket career

Cricket information
- Batting: Right-handed
- Bowling: Right-arm medium

Domestic team information
- Years: Team
- 1895–1896: Norfolk
- 1906: Hampshire

Career statistics
Competition	First-class
Matches	5
Runs scored	121
Batting average	15.12
100s/50s	–/1
Top score	73
Balls bowled	426
Wickets	9
Bowling average	28.77
5 wickets in innings	–
10 wickets in match	–
Best bowling	3/62
Catches/stumpings	4/–
- Source: Cricinfo, 3 March 2010

Surgeon Rear-Admiral Robert Harry Mornement OBE (15 August 1873 — 16 April 1948) was a surgeon in the Royal Navy and an English first-class cricketer.

The son of Edward Mornement, he was born in August 1873 at Roudham, Norfolk. Mornement was a medical student at the Middlesex Hospital, graduating in 1896. During his studies, Mornement played minor counties cricket for Norfolk in 1895 and 1896, making two appearances against Hertfordshire at Bishop's Stortford in the Minor Counties Championship. In 1897, he was an assistant medical officer at the Cane Hill Hospital. In December 1899, he joined the Royal Navy Medical Service (RNMS) and was appointed staff surgeon aboard HMS Highflyer, before being appointed staff surgeon at Eastney Barracks in Portsmouth in June 1905. Having scored heavily for the Royal Navy Cricket Club in minor cricket matches, Mornement made his debut in first-class cricket for Hampshire against Yorkshire at Sheffield in the 1906 County Championship. He made two further first-class appearances for Hampshire in 1906, against Warwickshire and Somerset. In his three matches for Hampshire, he took six wickets with his right-arm medium pace bowling at an average of 28.50, with best figures of 3 for 62.

Mornement transferred aboard HMS Commonwealth as staff surgeon in May 1907. He later made two further appearances in first-class cricket for the combined Army and Navy cricket team against a combined Oxford and Cambridge Universities cricket team at Portsmouth in 1910 and Aldershot in 1911. He took three wickets at an average of 29.33 in his two matches, in addition to scoring his only first-class half century, with a score of 73 at Aldershot. Mornement served during the First World War, initially in the Royal Navy as a fleet surgeon, before being attached to the Medical Branch of the British Army as a temporary lieutenant colonel. Toward the end of the war, he was made a Grade A lieutenant colonel in October 1918, and following its conclusion he was made an OBE in the 1919 New Year Honours. After the war, he was attached to the Royal Air Force, where he held the rank of wing commander until October 1919, when he returned to duties with the RNMS. He was reappointed to Eastney Barracks in January 1921, and was made a surgeon captain in December 1923. He was placed on the retired list in August 1928, and was promoted to surgeon rear admiral in April 1929. Mornement died at the Royal Naval Hospital at Chatham on 16 April 1948.
