= George Ernest Shaw =

British colonial administrator (1877-1958)

George Ernest Shaw OBE CMG

British Adviser Kelantan
- In office 1926–1928
- Preceded by: Arthur Furley Worthington
- Succeeded by: Reginald John Byard Clayton

British Adviser Johore
- In office 1928–1931
- Preceded by: Charles Walter Hamilton Cochrane
- Succeeded by: Richard Olaf Winstedt

Personal details
- Born: 5 January 1877
- Died: 1958 (aged 80–81)
- Occupation: Colonial administrator

George Ernest Shaw OBE CMG (5 January 1877 – 1958) was a British colonial administrator who served as British Adviser in Kelantan and Johore.

== Early life and education ==
George Ernest Shaw was born on 5 January 1877, and was educated in Dublin where he received his BA in Law.

== Career ==
In 1900, Shaw entered the Malay Civil Service as a cadet, and was posted to Larut as acting assistant Collector of Land Revenue. From 1901 to 1911, he held various positions in Krian including Inspector of Mines, Collector of Land Revenue, assistant Immigration Agent, and acting assistant District Officer.

In 1911, he was seconded to Kedah as Adviser, Lands. In 1916, he went to the War Office in London where he was attached to the Directorate of Prisoners of War and, in recognition of his work, was awarded the OBE. He then returned to Malaya and resumed his position in Kedah.

In 1923, he was appointed Acting Commissioner, Lands and Mines in Johore before being sent on special duty to Burma. In 1926, he was appointed British Adviser, Kelantan. In 1927, he was enrolled as a member of the Johore State Council, and in 1928, was appointed General Adviser, Johore, remaining in the post until his retirement on health grounds in 1931.

== Honours ==
Shaw was appointed as an officer the Order of the British Empire (OBE) in the 1919 New Years Honours, and was appointed Companion of the Order of St Michael and St George (CMG) in the 1931 Birthday Honours.
