= Eric St John Lawson =

British colonial police officer (1869–1954)

Eric St John Lawson OBE

Commissioner of Police of Bangkok, Siam
- In office 1902–1914
- Preceded by: A. J. Jardine

Personal details
- Born: 24 June 1869
- Died: 25 April 1954 (aged 84)
- Occupation: Colonial police officer

Eric St John Lawson (24 June 1869 – 25 Apr 1954) was a British colonial police officer who served as Commissioner of Police of Bangkok, Siam from 1902 to 1914.

== Biography ==
Lawson was born on 24 June 1869. He was educated at Westminster School from 1881 to 1885.

Lawson joined the British Burma police force in April 1891, and was subsequently transferred to North West Provinces and Oudh. After promotion to assistant District Superintendent of Police in 1893, he was assigned to famine work in addition to other duties in Banda District, and his services were favourably mentioned in a Government report issued at the close of the famine.

Lawson left British India in 1898 when the Indian government placed his services at the disposal of Government of Siam to assist in the reorganisation of its police force. After appointment as district superintendent in 1899, he was promoted to Commissioner of Police, Bangkok, in 1902, serving until 1914.

Lawson, during his twelve years as commissioner of police in Bangkok, is credited with introducing many reforms which led to the improvement and modernisation of the police force. He was responsible for establishing a Criminal Investigation Department along the lines of the British Special Branch, instituting standard rules, reports, and handbooks. He introduced a system of fingerprinting, founded schools to train police officers, established a police hospital, and published the first police manual in Siamese and English.

After the outbreak of the First World War, Lawson left Siam and joined the British Army in 1915. He served with British Expeditionary Force in France in 1916 and rose to the rank of Lieutenant-Colonel in 1917. After being demobilised in 1919, he returned to Siam as adviser to the Ministry of Local Government before retiring in 1921. He died on 25 April 1954, aged 84.

== Honours ==
Lawson was appointed Officer of the Order of the British Empire (OBE) in the 1919 New Year Honours. He was awarded the First Class of the Order of the Crown of Siam in 1914.

== See also ==
- Royal Thai Police
