= Ernest Holloway =

British civil engineer

Sir Ernest Holloway KCB, OBE
- Born: 24 April 1887
- Died: 27 February 1961 (aged 73)
- Citizenship: United Kingdom
- Children: 2
- Engineering career
- Discipline: Civil Engineering
- Institutions: Air Ministry
- Awards: Knight Commander of the Order of the Bath (1944); Companion of the Order of the Bath (1941)
- Military career
- Service: Royal Flying Corps (1915-1918); Royal Air Force (1918-1919)
- Rank: Major
- Conflicts: World War I World War II
- Awards: Officer of the Order of the British Empire (1919)

Sir Ernest Holloway KCB OBE (24 April 1887 – 27 February 1961) was a British civil engineer. As Assistant Director of Works at the Air Ministry from 1934 to 1937, Deputy Director of Works from 1937 to 1939, Director of Works from 1939 until his retirement in 1947, he oversaw a massive program of construction of airbases and facilities for the Royal Air Force and the United States Air Force. He died in 1961 at the age of 73.

== Early life and war service ==
Ernest Holloway was born on 24 April 1887. He was educated at King Edward's School, Birmingham, and studied engineering at the Central Technical Institute. Between 1902 and 1906, he received technical training under T. H. Shipton, and stayed on as his assistant when he completed his training. Between 1908 and 1915, he worked for the Rural District Councils of Evesham in Worcestershire and Pebworth in Gloucestershire, where he worked on civil engineering projects, such as water supplies, sewers, bridges and roads. He oversaw five housing schemes in Gloucestershire, which involved the construction of roads and access to utilities.

During the Great War, Holloway served with the Royal Flying Corps and the Royal Air Force (RAF), rising to the rank of major. For his service, he was made an Officer of the Order of the British Empire in the 1919 New Year honours.

== Civil Service career ==
After the war, Holloway join the Civil Service as a civil engineer in the Air Ministry, with responsibility for works in the South Eastern District area, with an annual budget of £300,000 (equivalent to £15.2 million in 2025). He was promoted to Superintending Engineer, Grade 2, in 1922, and from 1925 to 1928 worked on the £5,000,000 (equivalent to £348 million in 2025) Air Ministry Home Defence Expansion programme. Between 1928 and 1930 he was the Superintending Engineer, Grade 1, Coastal Area, responsible for construction of coastal stations, seaplane bases and training establishments.

From 1930 to 1932, Holloway was the chief engineer for the Air Defence of Great Britain. He then became the chief engineer for the RAF in the Middle East, overseeing works in Egypt, the Sudan, Yemen, Palestine and Jordan. He was Assistant Director of Works at the Air Ministry from 1934 to 1937, overseeing a £33,000,000 (equivalent to £2.62 billion in 2025) programme that involved the construction of 50 new RAF bases. He became Deputy Director of Works in 1937, and Director of Works in 1939. As such he oversaw the wartime construction of bases for the RAF and the United States Air Force. He retired in 1947.

== Later life and legacy ==
For his services he was appointed a Companion of the Order of the Bath in the 1941 New Year Honours, and promoted to Knight Commander of the Order of the Bath in the 1944 Birthday Honours.

He died on 27 February 1961. He was survived by his wife and two daughters.
