= J. A. Stevens =

British colonial police officer (1873–1934)

Lieutenant-Colonel James Algernon Stevens CIE OBE VD (2 October 1873 – 11 December 1934) was a British customs officer in India.

The son of Sir John Stevens of the Indian Civil Service, Stevens was educated at Blundell's School and Corpus Christi College, Cambridge. He joined the Indian Police Service in 1898, but transferred to the Indian Customs Service in 1906. From 1913 to 1921, he served as Chief Collector of Customs in Burma and from 1921 he was Collector of Customs in Bombay. While in Rangoon, he commanded the 18th (Rangoon) Battalion of the Indian Defence Force.

He was appointed Officer of the Order of the British Empire (OBE) in 1919 and Companion of the Order of the Indian Empire (CIE) in the 1920 New Year Honours.
