= John Gilhespy =

Australia cricketer, British Army officer and educator

Personal information
- Full name: John William Edward Gilhespy
- Born: Q4 1883; Penzance, Cornwall, England
- Died: 4 July 1959; Roehampton, Surrey, England
- Batting: Unknown
- Bowling: Unknown

Domestic team information
- Years: Team
- 1921–1924: Cornwall
- 1923/24: Europeans

Career statistics
Competition	First-class
Matches	2
Runs scored	42
Batting average	10.50
100s/50s	–/–
Top score	29
Balls bowled	72
Wickets	0
Bowling average	–
5 wickets in innings	–
10 wickets in match	–
Best bowling	–
Catches/stumpings	–/–
- Source: ESPNcricinfo, 10 November 2021

John William Edward Gilhespy OBE (1883 – 4 July 1959) was an English first-class cricketer and Royal Navy officer.

The son of Thomas Gilhespy, he was born at Penzance in the final quarter of 1883. He served in the Royal Navy during the First World War, initially as an assistant paymaster, before being promoted to paymaster in September 1916. By wars end he held the rank of paymaster lieutenant commander and was appointed to the Order of the British Empire in the 1919 New Year Honours for services rendered during the war. In October 1919, he was decorated by France with the Croix de Guerre and by the Kingdom of Italy with the Order of the Crown of, both for distinguished service during the war. As a cricketer, he played minor counties cricket for his native Cornwall from 1921 to 1924, making eight appearances in the Minor Counties Championship. He played first-class cricket while stationed in British India, making two appearances for the Europeans cricket team in December 1923 against the Parsees and the Hindus in the Bombay Quadrangular. He scored 42 runs across his two matches, with a highest score of 29. Gilhespy was a paymaster-commander by 1932, with him being promoted to paymaster-captain in December 1932. He retired from active service in September 1938. Gilhespy died in July 1959 at Roehampton, Surrey.
