= George Duncan (biblical scholar) =

Scottish clergyman (1884–1965)

George Simpson Duncan OBE (1884–1965) was a 20th-century Scottish clergyman and Christian scholar.

== Early life ==
George Duncan was born on 8 March 1884, the son of Alexander Duncan, a tailor's cutter, in Forfar in Angus, Scotland. He was educated at Forfar Academy. His two parents and his elder brother died of disease as he was still a young man. As an orphan, this promising student received financial help from a scottish wealthy family.

He obtained an MA degree in Classics (1st Class) from Edinburgh University in 1906. He then undertook postgraduate studies at Trinity College, Cambridge, St. Andrews University, and at the universities of Jena, Marburg and Heidelberg. He was ordained as a minister in the Church of Scotland in 1915 at the age of 31.

== First World War ==
He served with the Royal Army Chaplains' Department in the First World War on the Western Front from late 1915 to the end of the conflict, where on arrival he was attached to the British Expeditionary Force's General Headquarters, and was the Commander-in-Chief Field Marshal Sir Douglas Haig's favoured chaplain. At the end of the war he was appointed an officer of the Order of the British Empire in the 1919 New Year Honours.

== Later life ==
He was professor of biblical criticism at the University of St Andrews from 1919, and principal of its St. Mary's College from 1940, retiring from both posts in 1954. He was Moderator of the General Assembly of the Church of Scotland in 1949, and vice-president of the British Council of Churches from 1950 to 1952.

In the late 1950s he worked as a translator of the New Testament text for the New English Bible.

In the mid-1960s he wrote an account of his war experiences in World War 1, as a part of a wider apologia for Douglas Haig that comprises its text, whose historical reputation had suffered for his conduct of military operations in the conflict. The account was published posthumously entitled: Douglas Haig As I Knew Him (1966).

== Death ==
Duncan died in April 1965 in his 82nd year.

== Family ==
In July 1923 he married Amy Hay Thomson, daughter of Rev James Thomson of Gartly and widow of J. H. Norden, but the marriage was short-lived, ending with her death in February 1924, less than a year later.

== Publications ==
- St. Paul's Ephesian Ministry (1929)
- New English Bible (translator) (1961).
- Douglas Haig As I Knew Him (1966).
