= Guy Chapman =

English historian, 1889–1972

Major Guy Patterson Chapman OBE MC (September 1889 – June 1972) was an English historian and author. He served in the British army in both world wars.

== Early life and education ==
Chapman was educated at Westminster School, Christ Church, Oxford and the London School of Economics.

== Military service ==
Chapman served in the Royal Fusiliers in 1914–20, particularly in France and Belgium in 1915–18 during the First World War. He was appointed an Officer of the Order of the British Empire (OBE) in the 1919 New Year Honours and awarded the Military Cross (MC) in December 1919:

"For conspicuous gallantry and leadership near Ghissignies, on 4th November, 1918. When the battalion was going through Gihissignies in support of the attack, information was received that the left company of the leading battalion had been held up. Under heavy shell fire he went forward to reconnoitre, and found that the supporting battalion appeared likely to become prematurely involved in the fighting. By his energy and initiative in taking command of the situation this was prevented."

From 1920 to 1940, Chapman was involved in book publishing and then served in the Second World War.

== Academic career ==
From 1945 to 1953 Chapman was professor of Modern History at the University of Leeds. In 1948–49 he was a visiting professor at the University of Pittsburgh.

== Marriage ==
Chapman married Margaret Storm Jameson in 1926.

== Works ==
- A Painted Cloth, 1930
- A Bibliography of the Works of William Beckford, 1931
- A Passionate Prodigality: Fragments of Autobiography, 1933 (2nd edition, 1965)
- Beckford: a Biography, 1938 (2nd edition, 1952)
- Culture and Survival, 1940
- The Dreyfus Case: a Reassessment, 1955
- The Third Republic of France: the First Phase, 1962
- Why France Collapsed, 1968
