= Edward Hefford =

Engineer Rear-Admiral Edward Hefford OBE

Engineer Overseer, London District, Royal Navy
- In office 1924–1925

Royal Navy Chief Engineer & President of the Allied Dockyard Commission, Constantinople
- In office 1921–1923

Personal details
- Born: Edward Owen Hefford; 1871 West Riding of Yorkshire, England
- Died: 7 August 1955 (aged 83–84) Paignton, Devon, England
- Occupation: Naval engineer officer, cyclist

Engineer Rear-Admiral Edward Owen Hefford OBE (1871 – 7 August 1955) was a Royal Navy officer.

Hefford grew up in Dewsbury and Huddersfield. He was educated at Batley Grammar School and then went to the Royal Naval Engineering College at Keyham, Plymouth, in 1886. Becoming a probationary assistant engineer after his training, he was confirmed in the rank of assistant engineer on 12 October 1892. He was promoted to engineer on 7 August 1896, later becoming an engineer lieutenant when engineering officer ranks were standardised with those of line officers. He was promoted to engineer commander on 1 June 1908, appointed Officer of the Order of the British Empire (OBE) in the 1919 New Year Honours for his service in the First World War, and promoted to engineer captain on 13 December 1919. From 1921 to 1923 he was chief engineer of the Royal Navy base and president of the Allied Dockyard Commission in Constantinople and from 1924 to 1925 he was engineer overseer for the Royal Navy's London District. He was promoted to engineer rear-admiral on 15 July 1925 and retired the following day.

Hefford was also a keen cyclist and a prominent member of the Cyclists' Touring Club. He was chairman of the council in 1947 and a vice-president in 1953. He married Mary Catherine Taylor in 1902; they had two daughters. Mary died in March 1955 and Hefford himself died in a nursing home in Paignton, Devon, on 7 August 1955.
