= Christopher Collier (cricketer) =

English cricketer (1886–1916)

Personal information
- Full name: Christopher George Arthur Collier
- Born: 23 August 1886; Banff, Scotland
- Died: 25 August 1916 (aged 30) near Mametz, France
- Batting: Right-handed
- Bowling: Right-arm slow

Domestic team information
- Years: Team
- 1910–1914: Worcestershire

Career statistics
Competition	FC
Matches	53
Runs scored	1,021
Batting average	12.92
100s/50s	0/1
Top score	72
Balls bowled	522
Wickets	10
Bowling average	36.90
5 wickets in innings	0
10 wickets in match	0
Best bowling	3/28
Catches/stumpings	13/0
- Source: CricketArchive, 1 March 2009

Christopher George Arthur Collier (23 August 1886 – 25 August 1916) was an English cricketer: a right-handed batsman and right arm slow bowler who played 53 first-class matches in the years before the First World War. 52 of these were for Worcestershire, with the one exception being the match he played for H. K. Foster's XI in 1912. In all he scored 1,021 runs at 12.92 and took ten wickets at 36.90.

Collier's first-class debut came against Warwickshire at Worcester in mid-May 1910. He did little with the bat, scoring 10 and 2, and did not bowl. Indeed, he did not send down a single ball in first-class cricket that season. His first wicket, in late May 1911, was that of Oxford University's opener Richard Twining, and he finished with five in the match.

He played fairly frequently for Worcestershire over the following three years, turning out in 45 matches between 1911 and 1914. He also played one match for H. K. Foster's XI against Oxford University in 1912, in which he claimed a career-best 3/28 in the first innings. Later that same summer, Collier also made his only half-century, hitting 72 for Worcestershire against Hampshire. He also occasionally acted as Scorer when not playing.

During World War I he served a staff sergeant in the Royal Army Ordnance Corps and was killed in action in the Battle of the Somme near Mametz, France, two days after his 30th birthday.
