= Hundreds of Cambridgeshire =

Historic division of Cambridge into 17 'hundreds' for administrative purposes

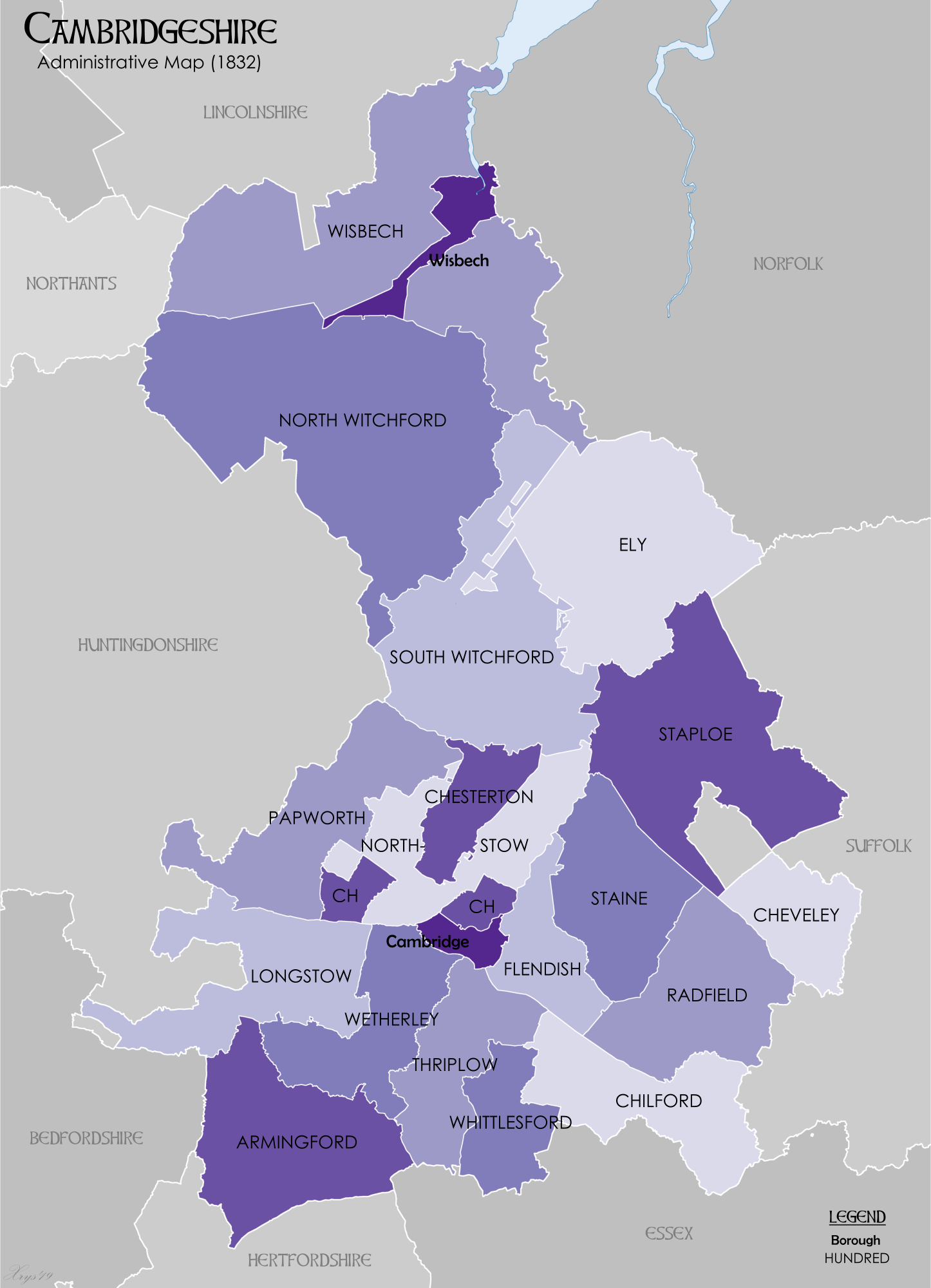
Hundreds of Cambridgeshire in 1832

Between Anglo-Saxon times and the 19th century Cambridgeshire was divided for administrative purposes into 17 hundreds, plus the borough of Cambridge. Each hundred had a separate council that met each month to rule on local judicial and taxation matters.

The shire-system of East Anglia was in all probability not definitively settled before the Norman Conquest, but during the Danish occupation of the 9th century the district possessed a certain military and political organization round Cambridge, its chief town, from where the constitution and demarcation of the later shire most likely originated.

At the time of the Domesday Survey in 1086 the county was divided into the hundreds as they are now, except that the Isle of Ely, which then formed two hundreds having their meeting-place at Witchford, were subsequently divided into the four hundreds of Wisbech, Ely, North Witchford and South Witchford, while Cambridge formed a hundred by itself. The hundred of Flendish was then known as Flamingdike.

During the 19th century the Isle of Ely was divided into the hundreds of Wisbech, North Witchford, South Witchford, and Ely, the Liberty of Whittlesey and Thorney, and the borough of Wisbech.

== Parishes ==
In 1929 the hundreds contained the following parishes.

Hundred	Area (acres)	Parishes
Armingford	29287	Abington Pigotts, Bassingbourn, Croydon, East Hatley, Guilden Morden, Litlington, Melbourn, Meldreth, Royston (part), Shingay, Steeple Morden, Tadlow, Wendy, Whaddon
Chesterton	15847	Chesterton, Childerley, Cottenham, Dry Drayton, Histon
Cheveley	12905	Ashley, Cheveley, Kirtling, Newmarket All Saints, Wood Ditton
Chilford	22364	Babraham, Bartlow, Castle Camps, Great Abington, Hildersham, Horseheath, Linton, Little Abington, Pampisford, Shudy Camps, West Wickham
Ely	42667	Downham, Littleport
Flendish	11906	Cherry Hinton, Fen Ditton, Fulbourn, Horningsea, Teversham
Longstow	25500	Bourn, Caldecote, Caxton, Croxton, Eltisley, Gamlingay, Great Eversden, Hardwick, Hatley St George, Kingston, Little Eversden, Little Gransden, Longstowe, Toft
North Witchford	86275	Chatteris, Doddington, March, Whittlesey
Northstow	19651	Girton, Impington, Landbeach, Lolworth, Longstanton, Madingley, Milton, Oakington, Rampton, Waterbeach
Papworth	26923	Boxworth, Conington, Elsworth, Fen Drayton, Graveley, Knapwell, Over, Papworth St Agnes, Papworth Everard, Swavesey, Willingham
Radfield	23869	Balsham, Brinkley, Burrough Green, Carlton-cum-Willingham, Dullingham, Stetchworth, West Wratting, Westley Waterless, Weston Colville
South Witchford	37462	Coveney, Grunty Fen, Haddenham, Manea, Mepal, Sutton, Stretham and Thetford, Welches Dam, Wentworth, Wilburton, Witcham, Witchford
Staine	18917	Bottisham, Great Wilbraham, Little Wilbraham, Swaffham Bulbeck, Swaffham Prior, Stow-cum-Quy
Staploe	40775	Burwell, Chippenham, Fordham, Isleham, Kennett, Landwade, Snailwell, Soham, Wicken
Thriplow	16160	Fowlmere, Foxton, Great Shelford, Harston, Hauxton, Little Shelford, Newton, Stapleford, Thriplow, Trumpington
Wetherley	16160	Arrington, Barrington, Barton, Comberton, Coton, Grantchester, Harlton, Haslingfield, Orwell, Shepreth, Wimpole
Whittlesford	11078	Duxford, Hinxton, Ickleton, Sawston, Whittlesford
Wisbech	61157	Elm, Leverington, Newton, Outwell, Parson Drove, Thorney, Tydd St Giles, Upwell, Wisbech, Wisbech St Mary

== See also ==
- History of Cambridgeshire
- List of hundreds of England and Wales
