= South Cambridgeshire =

Coordinates: 52.132°N 0.105°E

South Cambridgeshire District
- Non-metropolitan district
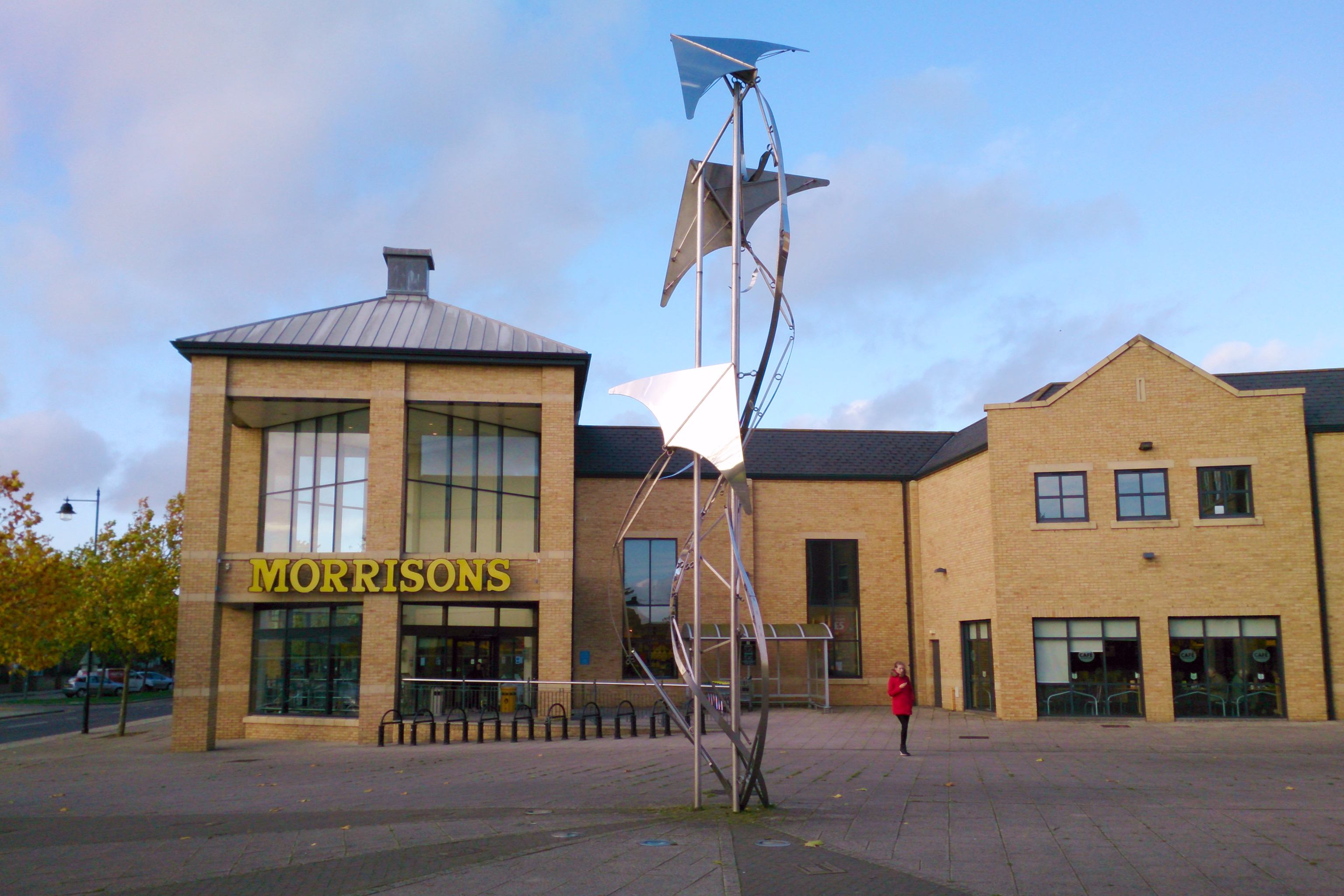
- Cambourne town centre

- South Cambridgeshire shown within Cambridgeshire
- Sovereign state: United Kingdom
- Country: England
- Region: East of England
- Non-metropolitan county: Cambridgeshire
- Status: Non-metropolitan district
- Admin HQ: Cambourne
- Incorporated: 1 April 1974

Government
  - Type: Non-metropolitan district council
  - Body: South Cambridgeshire District Council
  - Leadership: Leader & Cabinet (Liberal Democrat)
  - MPs: Pippa Heylings (LD); Ian Sollom (LD); Charlotte Cane (LD)

Area
  - Total: 348.12 sq mi (901.63 km^{2})
  - Rank: 35th (of 296)

Population (2025)
  - Total: 174,641
  - Rank: 121st (of 296)
  - Density: 501.67/sq mi (193.69/km^{2})

Ethnicity (2021)
  - Ethnic groups: List: 89% White; 5.8% Asian; 2.8% Mixed; 1.2% Black; 1.1% other

Religion (2021)
  - Religion: List: 45.3% Christianity; 43.3% no religion; 9.7% other; 1.7% Islam
- Time zone: UTC0 (GMT)
  - Summer (DST): UTC+1 (BST)
- ONS code: 12UG (ONS); E07000012 (GSS)
- OS grid reference: TL318598

South Cambridgeshire is a local government district of Cambridgeshire, England, with a population of 162,119 at the 2021 census. It was formed on 1 April 1974 by the merger of Chesterton Rural District and South Cambridgeshire Rural District. It completely surrounds the city of Cambridge, which is administered separately from the district by Cambridge City Council.

On the abolition of South Herefordshire and Hereford districts to form the unitary Herefordshire in 1998, South Cambridgeshire became the only English district to completely encircle another. South Cambridgeshire District Council and Cambridge City Council work together on some projects, such as the Greater Cambridge Local Plan. Since 2017 the district has been a constituent member of the Cambridgeshire and Peterborough Combined Authority, led by the directly-elected Mayor of Cambridgeshire and Peterborough.

South Cambridgeshire has scored highly on the best places to live, according to Channel 4, which ranked South Cambridgeshire as the fifth-best place to live in 2006. A Halifax survey rated South Cambridgeshire the best place to live in rural Britain, and sixth best overall in 2017.

In January 2023 the council started a three-month trial of a four day working week, with the intention of extending the trial until April 2024. Conservative local government minister, Lee Rowley, ordered the trial be halted, claiming it would breach the Local Government Act.

== History ==
The district was formed on 1 April 1974 under the Local Government Act 1972. The new district covered the area of two former districts, which were both abolished at the same time:

- Chesterton Rural District
- South Cambridgeshire Rural District

The new district was named South Cambridgeshire, reflecting its position within the wider county.

== Governance ==
South Cambridgeshire District Council

Type
- Type: Non-metropolitan district

Leadership
- Chair: Peter Sandford, Liberal Democrat since 22 May 2025
- Leader: Bridget Smith, Liberal Democrat since 23 May 2018
- Chief Executive: Liz Watts since 2019

Structure
- Seats: 45 councillors
- Political groups: Administration (43) Liberal Democrats (43) Other parties (2) Conservative (2)

Elections
- Voting system: Plurality-at-large
- Last election: May 2026
- Next election: May 2030

Meeting place
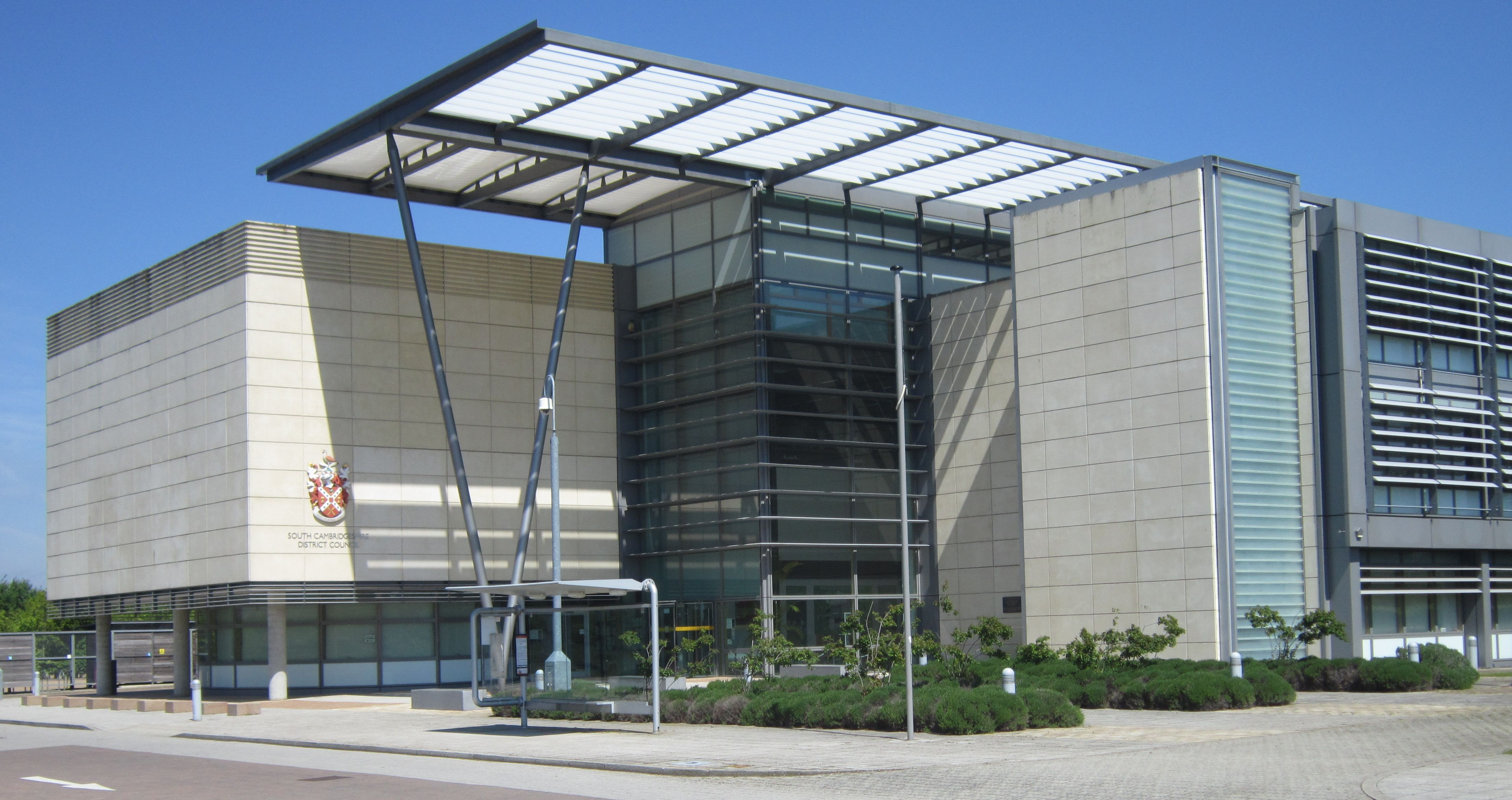
- South Cambridgeshire Hall, Cambourne Business Park, Cambourne, CB23 6EA

Website
- www.scambs.gov.uk

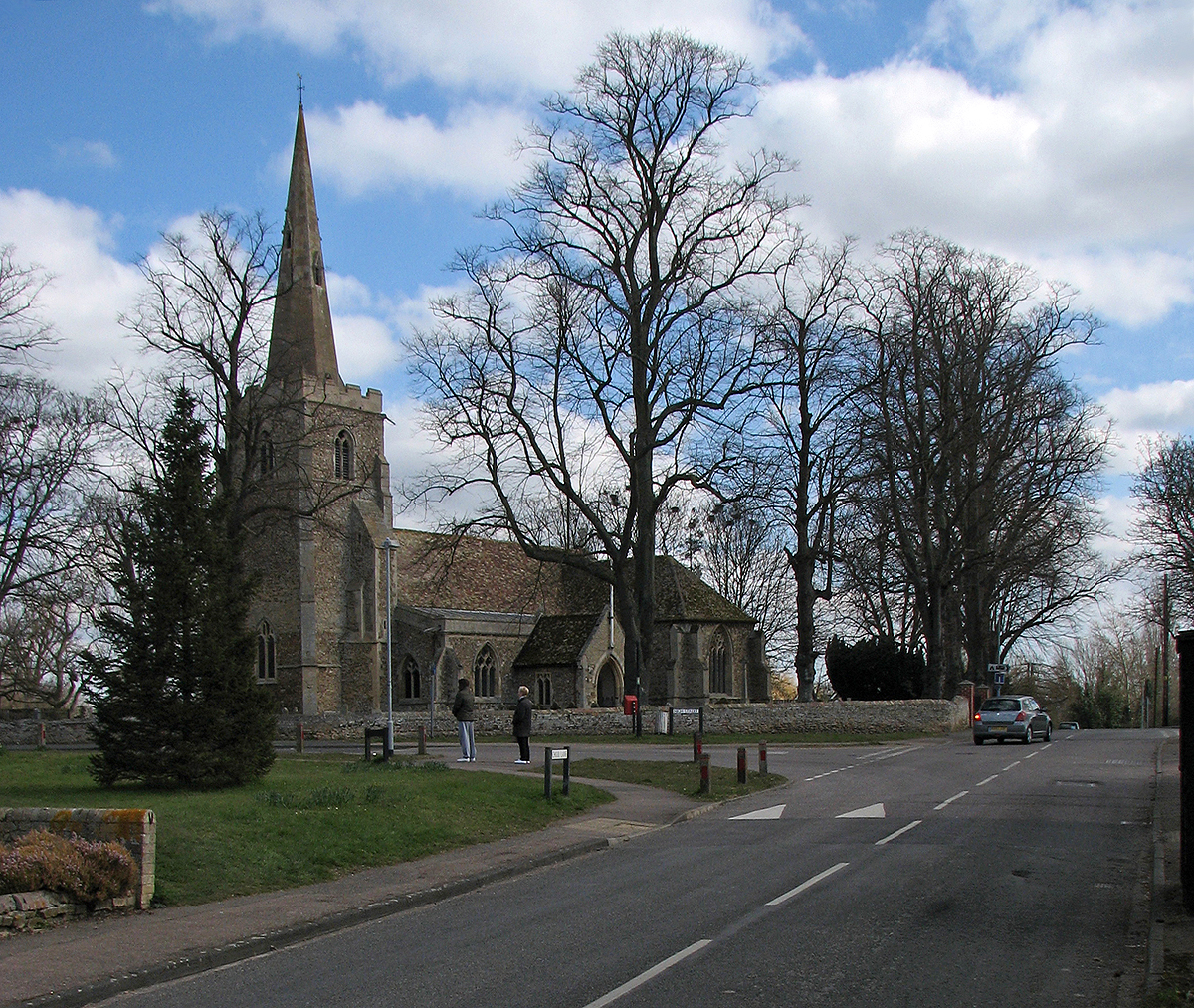
Longstanton, one of the many villages of the district

South Cambridgeshire District Council provides district-level services. County-level services are provided by Cambridgeshire County Council. The whole district is also covered by civil parishes, which form a third tier of local government.

=== Political control ===
The council has been under Liberal Democrat majority control since the 2018 election.

The first election to the council was held in 1973, initially operating as a shadow authority alongside the outgoing authorities until the new arrangements came into effect on 1 April 1974. Political control of the council since 1974 has been as follows:

Party in control	Years
Independent	1974–1992
No overall control	1992–2007
Conservative	2007–2018
Liberal Democrats	2018–present

=== Leadership ===
A leader of the council has been appointed since 2001. The leaders have been:

Councillor	Party	From	To
Daphne Spink	Conservative	2001	26 May 2005
Sebastian Kindersley	Liberal Democrats	26 May 2005	25 May 2006
David Bard	Conservative	25 May 2006	11 Jan 2007
Ray Manning	Conservative	25 Jan 2007	19 May 2016
Peter Topping	Conservative	19 May 2016	May 2018
Bridget Smith	Liberal Democrats	23 May 2018	

=== Composition ===
Following the 2026 election, the composition of the council was:

Party	Councillors
Liberal Democrats	43
Conservative	2
Total	45

The next election is due in 2030.

=== Elections ===
Since the last full review of boundaries in 2018 the council has comprised 45 councillors representing 26 wards, with each ward electing one, two or three councillors. Elections are held every four years.

== Key policies ==
=== Four day working week ===
In January 2023, the council began a controversial four day working week trial. This is not a compressed hours regime but rather staff work 80% of their hours for 100% of their pay and are expected to work more efficiently and therefore complete all their work in the reduced time.

The Conservative minister at the time, Lee Rowley wrote to the council leader "ask that you end your experiment immediately" and said he had concerns about the "value for money" for local taxpayers.

The scheme became particularly controversial when it emerged that the council's CEO was also writing a PhD thesis on flexible working, a fact that had not been earlier disclosed.

After 18 months of running the trial the council claimed reduced staff turnover, financial savings and little impact on service levels.

=== Premises ===
South Cambridgeshire District Council's headquarters are located in South Cambridgeshire Hall in the Cambourne Business Park in Cambourne. The district council's headquarters moved from Cambridge to Cambourne in 2004.

== Transportation ==
Cambridge Airport is located in South Cambridgeshire.

The Cambridgeshire Guided Busway passes through South Cambridgeshire.

== Economy ==
ScotAirways had its head office on the grounds of Cambridge Airport in South Cambridgeshire.

== Parishes ==
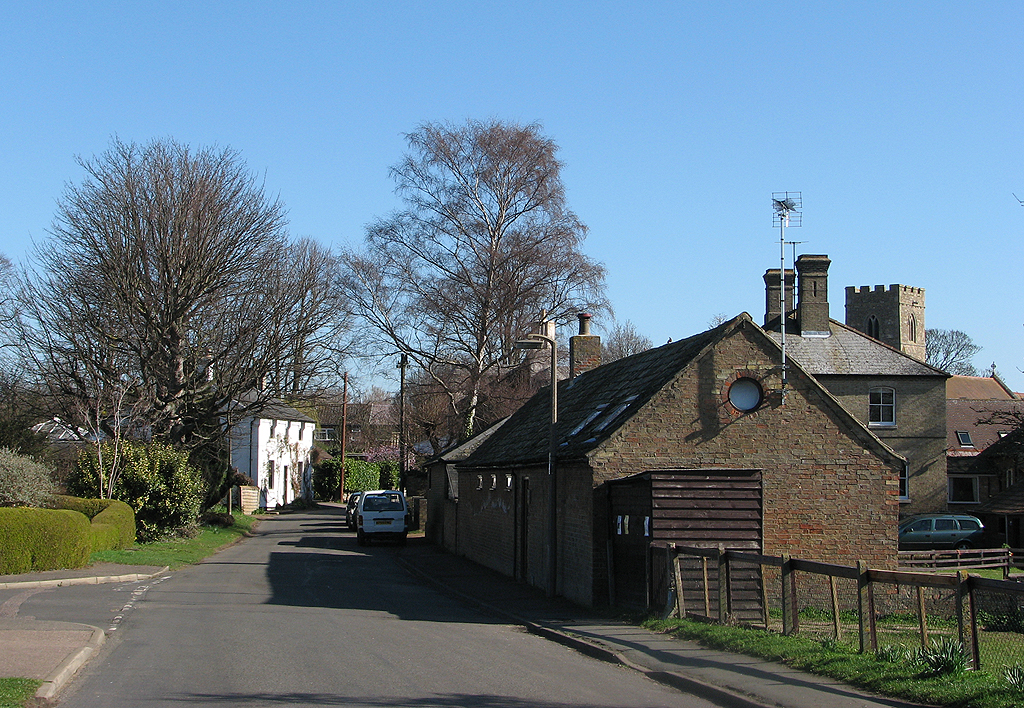
Oakington, one of the many villages in the district

The whole district is divided into civil parishes. The parish councils for Cambourne and Northstowe take the style "town council". Some of the smaller parishes have a parish meeting rather than a parish council.

== List of settlements ==
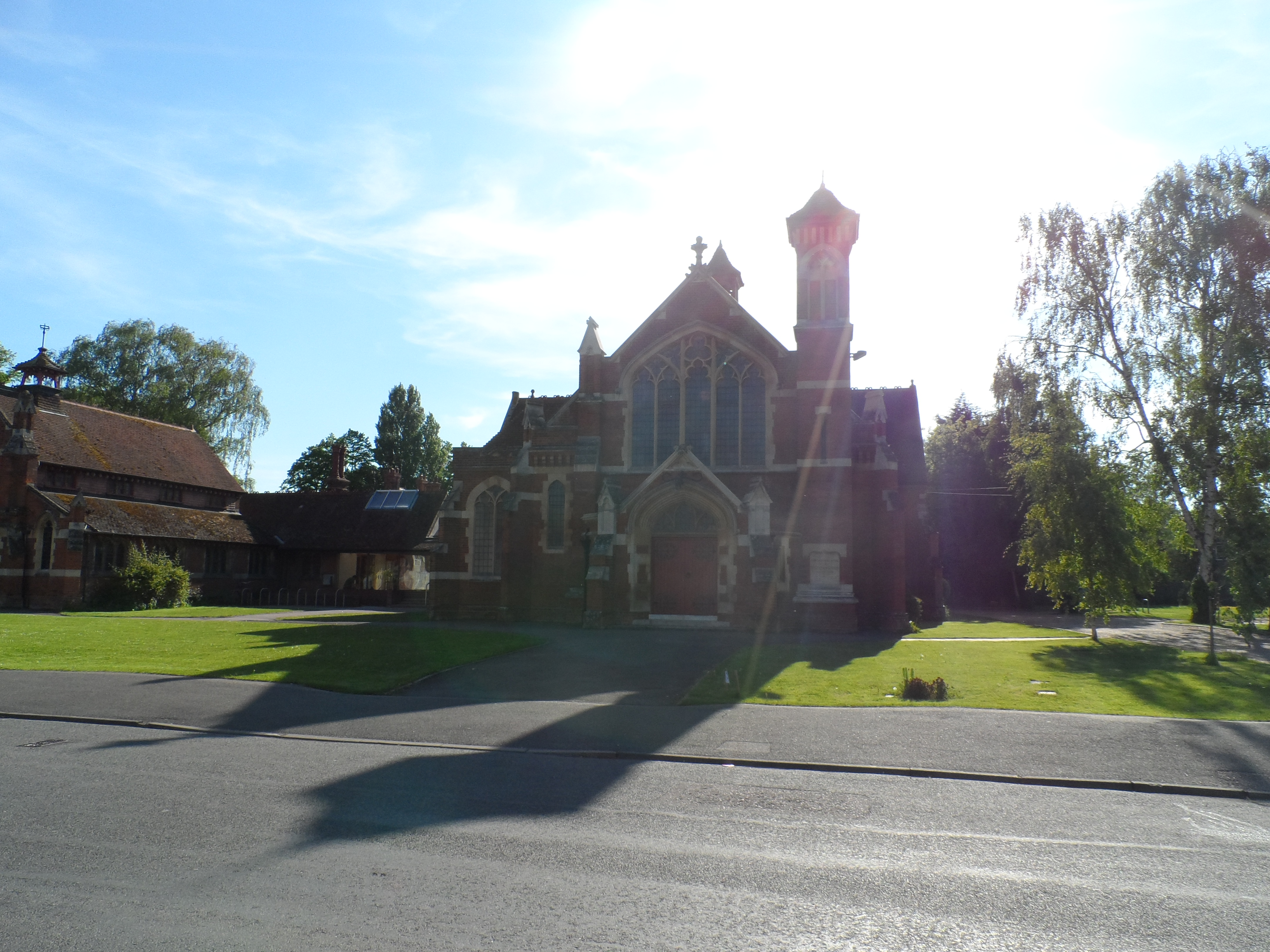
Histon, one of the largest villages in the district

Abington Piggotts – Arrington – Babraham – Balsham – Bar Hill – Barrington – Bartlow – Barton – Bassingbourn cum Kneesworth – Bourn – Boxworth – Caldecote – Cambourne – Carlton – Castle Camps – Caxton – Childerley – Chishills – Chittering – Comberton – Conington – Coton – Cottenham – Croxton – Croydon – Dry Drayton – Duxford – Elsworth – Eltisley – Fen Ditton – Fen Drayton – Fowlmere – Foxton – Fulbourn – Gamlingay – Girton – Grantchester – Graveley – Great Abington – Great Chishill – Great Eversden – Great Shelford – Great Wilbraham – Guilden Morden – Hardwick – Harlton – Harston – Haslingfield – Hatley – Hauxton – Heydon – Hildersham – Hinxton – Histon – Horseheath – Horningsea – Ickleton – Impington – Kingston – Knapwell – Landbeach – Linton – Litlington – Little Abington – Little Chishill –Little Eversden – Little Gransden – Little Shelford – Little Wilbraham – Lolworth – Longstanton – Longstowe – Madingley – Melbourn – Meldreth – Milton – Newton – Northstowe – Oakington – Orchard Park – Orwell – Over – Pampisford – Papworth Everard – Papworth St Agnes – Rampton – Sawston – Shepreth – Shingay cum Wendy – Shudy Camps – Six Mile Bottom – Stapleford – Steeple Morden – Stow-cum-Quy – Swavesey – Tadlow – Teversham – Thriplow & Heathfield – Toft – Waterbeach – West Wickham – West Wratting – Weston Colville – Westwick – Whaddon – Whittlesford – Willingham – Wimpole

== Arms ==
Coat of arms of South Cambridgeshire

Notes
Granted 13 May 1978
Crest
On a Wreath Argent and Gules upon a Mount Vert a Great Bustard close between the legs two Quill Pens in saltire points downward all proper.
Escutcheon
Gules on a Saltire Ermine between in chief a Cornucopia the horn Or replenished proper in fess two Garbs and in base the Sails of a Windmill Or a closed Book Gules clasped and garnished Or.
Motto
Niet Zonder Arbyt
(Dutch for "Nothing Without Work")

The council's coat of arms contains a tangential reference to the coat of arms of the University of Cambridge by way of the coat of arms of Cambridge suburb Chesterton. The motto, Niet Zonder Arbyt, means "Nothing Without Work" (or effort) in pre-standard Dutch; the only Dutch motto in British civic heraldry. It was originally the motto of Cornelius Vermuyden, who drained the Fens in the 17th century. The council uses a monochrome depiction of its coat of arms as its logo.
