= Bourn Brook, Cambridgeshire =

River in Cambridgeshire, England

Bourn Brook
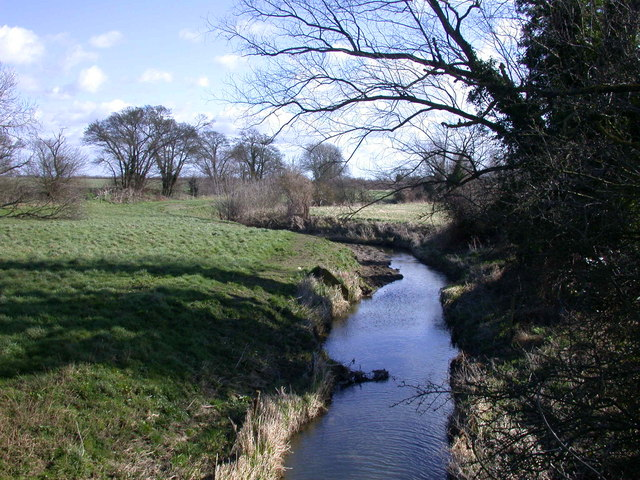
- Bourn Brook from Barton Bridge

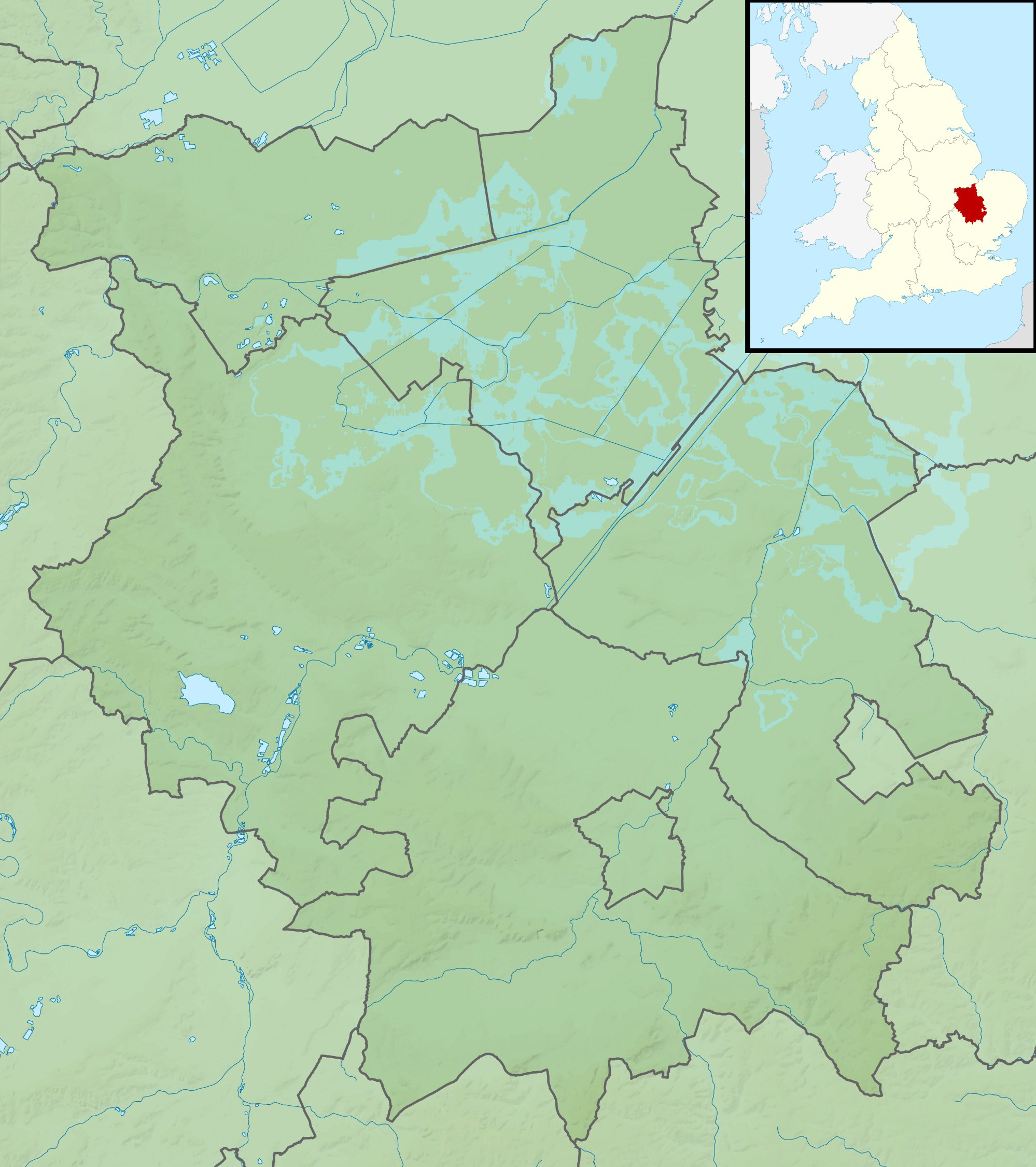
- Location of the mouth within Cambridgeshire

Location
- Country: United Kingdom
- County: Cambridgeshire

Physical characteristics
- Source
  - location: Eltisley
  - coordinates: 52.2176°N 0.1321°W
  - elevation: 62 m (203 ft)
- Mouth
  - location: River Cam at Byron's Pool
  - coordinates: 52.1714°N 0.098°E
- Length: 25.8 km (16.0 mi)
- Basin size: 85 km^{2} (33 sq mi)

Bourn Brook is a minor tributary of the River Cam in Cambridgeshire, England.

== Course ==
The Bourn Brook has its source just to the east of the village of Eltisley, 10 miles west of Cambridge, where the hills rise to around 60 metres above sea level. Minor tributaries known as the Eastern Brook, Hay Dean, Crow Dean and Gascote Dean merge just to the west of Caxton before it flows through Caxton, crossing the Roman road Ermine Street at its junction with the Bourn and Gransden roads.

A footpath then follows its course to the outskirts of Bourn, where it is forded by the Caxton End road, and then bisects the village of Bourn. The village takes its name from the brook − "bourn" being another word for a brook.

Flowing south-east from Bourn, it runs through Bourn Golf Course where it merges with the Dean Brook. Upon meeting the B1046 it turns east and runs alongside the former Varsity Line railway that closed in 1968. From this point until it reaches the River Cam it also forms the boundary between neighbouring parishes. Firstly it forms the northern parish boundary of Kingston then Great Eversden and the southern boundary of Caldecote and Toft, though at points it deviates slightly from the boundaries, indicating that its flow has altered since early medieval times.

After skirting the southern edge of Toft village, it crosses the Prime Meridian still following the former railway line that is now used as part of the Mullard Radio Astronomy Observatory. Here it forms the southern boundary of Comberton and then Barton and the northern boundary of Little Eversden, Harlton, and Haslingfield parishes, though it flows some distance away from the villages themselves.

Finally it crosses the M11 motorway and forms the boundary between Grantchester and Haslingfield before flowing into the River Cam at Byron's Pool a few hundred metres south of Grantchester village, where the poet Lord Byron is reputed to have swum.

== History ==
The stream is suggested to be the origin of the name of the Battle of Brunanburh fought in 937. A recently published article identifies the Bourn Brook Valley as the 'theatre of war', and that the battle, the location of which is unknown and has been speculated to have taken place in over 40 locations from South West England to Scotland, may have taken place on the open fields of Haslingfield, Harlton and Little Eversden.

== Usage ==
Bourn Brook is used for angling, though there are few fish in its waters. The fish most commonly seen are small roach, dace and perch.

== Flooding ==
After exceptionally heavy rainfall, Bourn Brook has occasionally flooded, most notably in 2001 when it reached an all-time high of 3.11 meters at Bourn causing significant damage to properties in Bourn and other villages. It regularly rises significantly in height making the Caxton End ford in Bourn impassable.
