= Eversden =

Eversden may refer to:

- Great Eversden, a village 6 miles south-west of Cambridge, England
- Little Eversden, a village approximately 7 miles south-west of Cambridge, England
