= Frog End =

Frog End is the name of two hamlets in South Cambridgeshire, themselves within the villages of:

- Haslingfield
- Shepreth
