= Bourn =

Village in Cambridgeshire, England

Coordinates: 52.19°N 0.061°W

- Location within Cambridgeshire
- Population: 1,015 (2011 Census)
- OS grid reference: TL327563
- District: South Cambridgeshire
- Shire county: Cambridgeshire
- Region: East
- Country: England
- Sovereign state: United Kingdom
- Post town: CAMBRIDGE
- Postcode district: CB23
- Dialling code: 01954
- Police: Cambridgeshire
- Fire: Cambridgeshire
- Ambulance: East of England

Bourn is a small village and civil parish in South Cambridgeshire, England. Surrounding villages include Caxton, Eltisley and Cambourne. It is 8 miles (12 km) from the county town of Cambridge. The population of the parish was 1,015 at the time of the 2011 census.

Bourn has a Church of England primary school, a doctors' surgery, the Church of St Mary & St Helena, a golf club, a former Royal Air Force bomber airfield (RAF Station Bourn 1940–1945), today used for light aircraft, and an old windmill. Bourn Hall Clinic, the centre for infertility treatment founded in 1980 by IVF pioneers Patrick Steptoe and Professor Robert Edwards, who were responsible for the conception in 1978 of Louise Brown, the world's first IVF or test-tube baby, is also located here. Since its foundation the clinic has assisted in the conception of more than 10,000 babies.

A small stream called Bourn Brook runs through the village, eventually joining the River Cam.

== History ==
The name Bourn is derived from the Old English burna or Old Scandinavian brunnr, meaning '(place at) the spring(s) or stream(s)'. It was spelled Brune in the 1086 Domesday Book. In a hypothesis, the phonetic inconsistencies in the early recorded names of Bourn and the Bourn Brook, Cambridgeshire are suggested to be strikingly similar to those relating to the Battle of Brunanburh fought in 937. The battle, the location of which is unknown and has been speculated to have taken place in over 40 locations from South West England to Scotland, is suggested to have taken place close to the brook, on the open fields of Haslingfield, Harlton and Little Eversden.

Bourn has existed as a settlement for over a thousand years. Roman remains have been found along the Bourn Brook and near Bourn Hall. Evidence of Romano-British activity has been found along the top of the valley on the airfield and in the direction of Caxton. Three tumuli on Alms Hill are of Roman and Danish origin and the two that were excavated in 1909 contained Roman coins and pottery, a Celtic button and evidence of Danish feasting commemorating the death of a leader or celebrating a victory around 1010.

Bourn Inclosure Act 1809
- Act of Parliament
- Parliament of the United Kingdom
- Long title: An Act for inclosing Lands in the Parish of Bourn, in the County of Cambridge.
- Citation: 49 Geo. 3. c. 38 Pr.

Dates
- Royal assent: 12 May 1809

The mediaeval village was in a wooded valley and developed along both sides of the Bourn Brook. The farming system of common grazing land and six large fields managed in a three-course rotation lasted until the Bourn Inclosure Act 1809 (49 Geo. 3. c. 38 Pr.). By 1279 there were 183 families and 900 people; the names of fields and families from this time are still known in the area. By the 14th century Bourn's population had dropped to 299 because of factors including the plague, high taxes, poor weather, the emergence of the yeoman farmer and the decrease in serfdom.

By the 19th century settlement in Bourn parish was concentrated along the High Street near the church, though there were also streets and ancient closes in the areas of the village known as Caxton End and Crow End.

The population had grown to 945 by 1851. This fell to 587 in 1931, during the Great Depression, but after World War II a large influx of squatters from London came to live on the disused airfield and the population was 1,053 in 1951. Some later occupied Bourn's first council housing estate, Hall Close.

== RAF Bourn ==
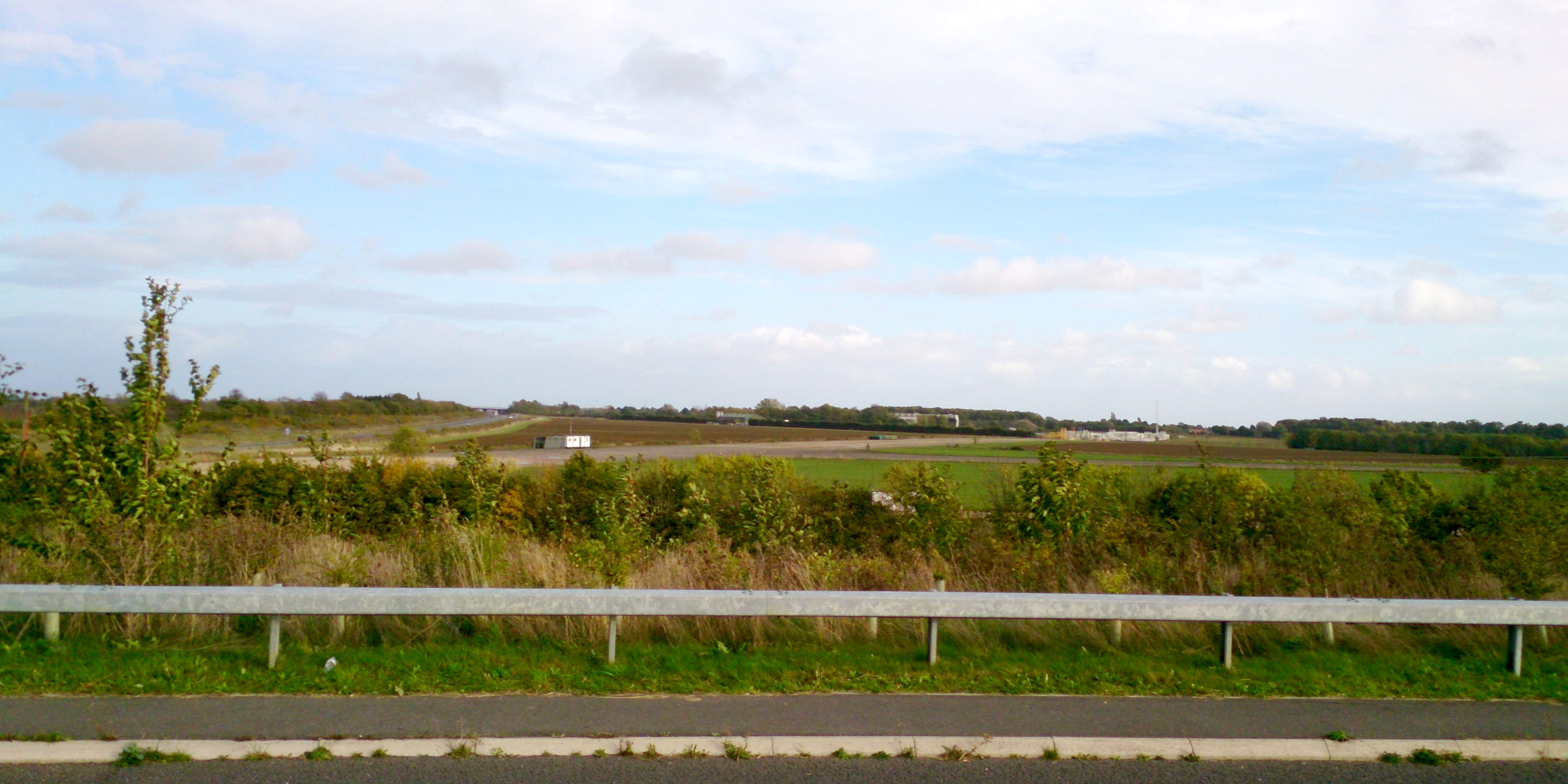
Bourn Airfield viewed from Broadway in October 2013

Bourn Airfield was constructed for RAF Bomber Command in 1940 as a satellite airfield for nearby RAF Oakington.

Now the Rural Flying Corps uses part of the runway for light aircraft; small industrial developments occupy other areas of the site. On Bank Holidays, Bourn Market uses much of the old runways for stalls.

== Governance ==
Bourn parish council has nine councillors. The parish is represented on South Cambridgeshire District Council by three councillors for the Bourn ward and on Cambridgeshire County Council by one councillor. It is represented at the House of Commons as part of the South Cambridgeshire constituency.

== Geography ==
Bourn village is north of the B1046 road, east of Caxton and south of Cambourne. It is 8 miles (12 km) west of Cambridge and 47 miles (76 km) north of London. The South Cambridgeshire (Parishes) Order 2004 created a new parish of Cambourne and changed the boundaries of Bourn parish.

Bourn parish ranges from 32 to 72 metres above sea level and the soil is clay with a gault subsoil. In 2001, the area of the parish was 1,660 hectares.

== Demography ==
At the time of the 2001 census, the population of Bourn parish was 1,764 people living in 713 households. 96.1% were White, 1.4% Asian or Asian British, 0.2% Black or Black British, and 1.2% 'other'. 68.6% described themselves as Christian and 29.9% said they had no religion or did not state one.

== Landmarks ==
A war memorial to commemorate Bourn men who died in the First and Second World Wars stands at the junction of the High Street and Short Street.

=== Mill ===
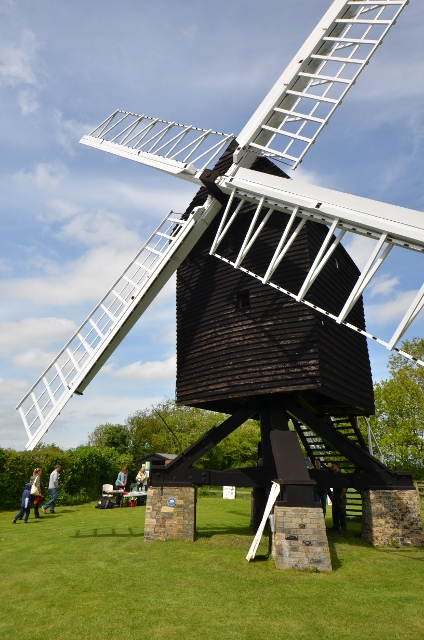
Bourn Mill

Bourn Windmill dates from at least 1636, when it was sold by John Cook. It is believed to be the second oldest surviving windmill in the UK after Pitstone Windmill in Buckinghamshire. In 1741, Richard Bishop was killed when he was trying to turn the mill in high winds and part of it blew down. The mill was sold in 1926 when it became outmoded by engines fuelled by paraffin. It has been owned by Cambridge Past, Present and Future (formerly known as the Cambridge Preservation Society) since 1932.

The body of the mill, the 'buck', contains all the machinery and is balanced on a 'post' supported by an oak trestle, which supports the entire weight of the mill, and bolted to four brick piers. Four sails and millstones in front of the post balance the double steps (which act as a thrust support when down) and the tail pole behind (which is used to turn the sails into the wind). It is called a 'Post Mill' because of its supporting post.

The sails have to face squarely into the wind so the buck, with the weight of all its machinery, has to be turned. First the talber (step lever) is pulled down and hooked into place to raise the steps, then the miller pushes the tail pole round and lastly lowers the steps again. The sails will turn without canvas in a strong wind but two 'common sails' (with close slats) can be 'clothed' by threading ringed canvasses on to central steel rods and roping them on to the sails. The other pair were fitted with 'automatic spring shutters' which opened releasing wind pressure when it blew too hard. Only two broken shutters remain of these.

The mill was repaired and restored in 2003 after a grant from Heritage Lottery Fund. The work meant that the mill's sails could turn by wind, but it was not restored to a condition where it could grind. In November 2021, the mill was placed on the Heritage at Risk Register, being said to be in danger of collapsing.

=== Bourn Hall ===
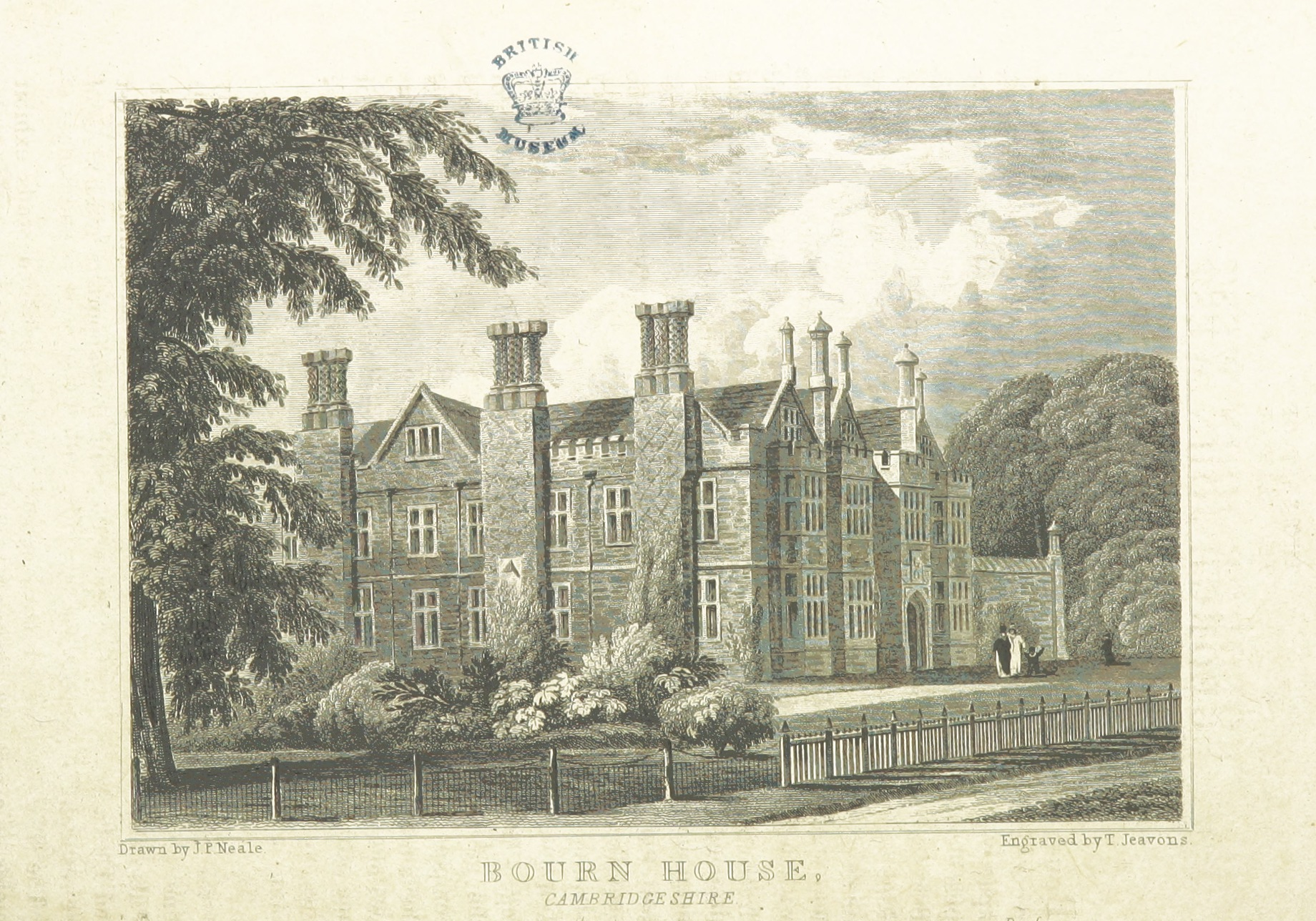
Bourn Hall, c. 1818

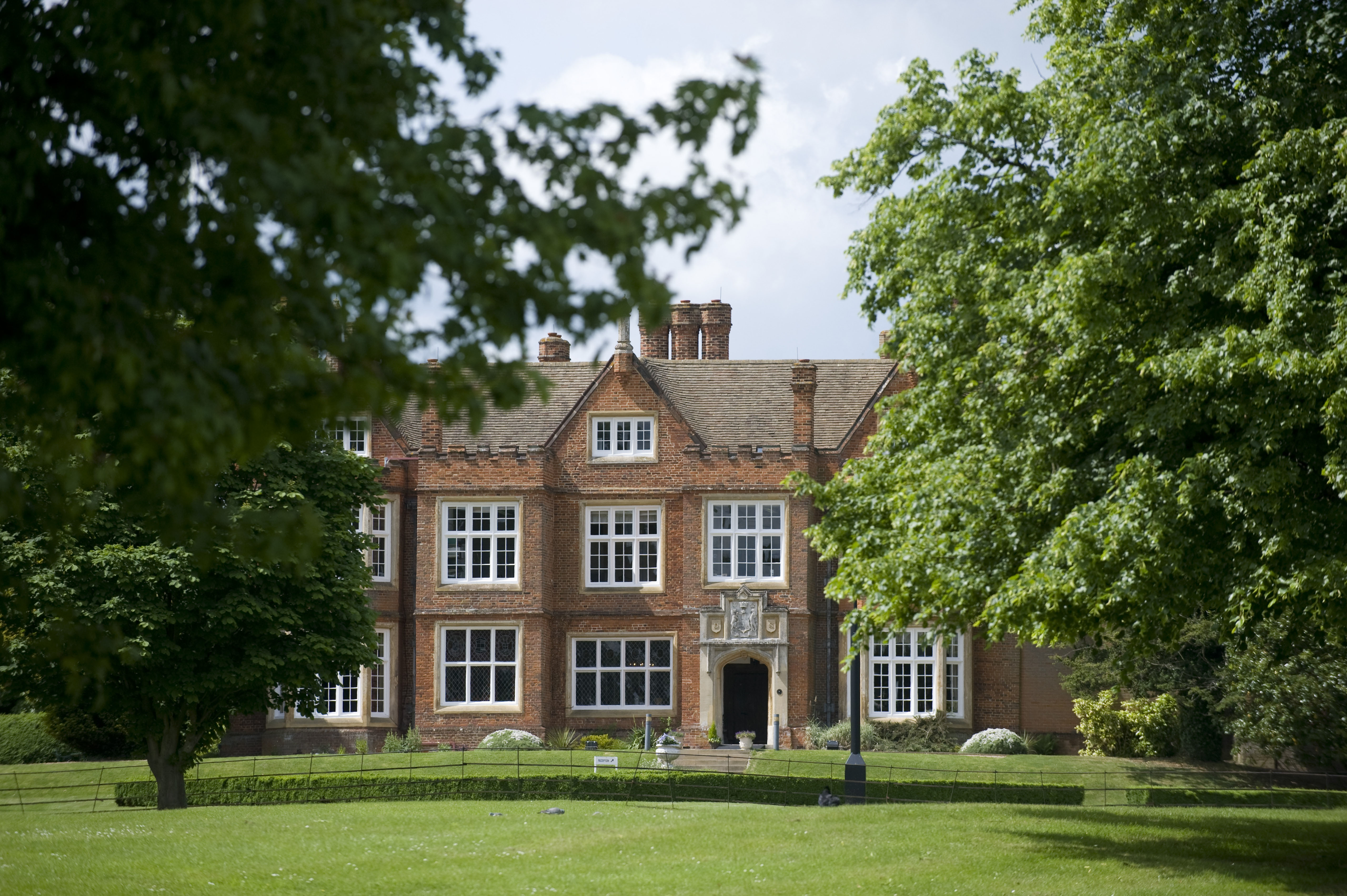
Bourn Hall in 2013

The present Bourn Hall is built on the site of a wooden castle that was burnt down during the Peasants' Revolt. A timber-framed house built early in the 16th century was added to in 1602 by the Hagar family in the form of a three-sided courtyard hall. Rainwater gutters at the front of Bourn Hall still have the initials of John and Francis Hagar.

The Hagar family left Bourn Hall in 1733, and the estate belonged to the De La Warr family until 1883. During this period, the house was visited by Queen Victoria and Prince Albert while they were staying at Wimpole Hall. The last family connection with the village was Lady Mary, daughter of the 7th Earl De La Warr and wife of Major Griffin, who bought the house in 1921 and lived there until 1957. The property was then acquired by Peter and Ann King.

Bourn Hall was bought by Patrick Steptoe and Bob Edwards in 1980. It became a world-famous clinic for the treatment of infertility and is known as the Bourn Hall Clinic.

=== Wysing Arts Centre ===
Just outside the village to the west of Bourn is Wysing Arts Centre, a research and development centre for the visual arts. Wysing Arts operates a year-round programme of public exhibitions, events, schools and family activities, alongside artistic residencies and retreats.

== Education ==
Bourn has had a history of education in the village since 1520. From 1819 boys were taught in the church tower and girls received a more limited education in a nearby cottage. The Church and the Hall combined to build a school in 1866, designed for 144 children. Within three years 81 children were attending, paying 2d, 3d or 6d for their schooling. This school was closed in 1958 and became the Village Hall, which has recently been extended and improved with grant aid and is a meeting place for village functions.

A new school was built in 1958 on the edge of the village, adjacent to open fields. It is within walking distance of most of the village. The school serves a large rural area of about 24 square miles (62 km^{2}). It is designated a Church of England controlled school. Bourn School serves the villages of Bourn, Caxton, Longstowe and Kingston and is in the catchment area of Comberton Village College, deemed in 2005 to be one of the best state secondary schools in the country.

== Religious sites ==
Following the Norman Conquest, a wooden church at Bourn was given to the monks of Barnwell Priory by Picot, the Sheriff of Cambridgeshire, who built his wooden castle next to it. The current stone church, dedicated to St Mary and St Helena, dates from the 12th century onwards and is built of field stones and ashlar, with dressings of limestone and clunch, in the Transitional, Early English and later styles. Following the Reformation, the church was given to Christ's College, Cambridge, which is patron and responsible for the chancel repairs. The tower has a twisted spire and houses a belfry with a full peal of eight bells. There are some pictures and a description of the church on the Cambridgeshire Churches website .

Memorials in the church include one to Erasmus Ferrar, brother of Nicholas Ferrar, founder of the Little Gidding community. John Collett, farmer, of Bourn Manor was the husband of Susannah, sister to Erasmus and Nicholas, who were frequent visitors to the parish, where the family took refuge from the plague. There were Protestant dissenters in Bourn from 1644 and there was a Methodist Chapel active in the village until 1982. The ecclesiastical parish is in the diocese of Ely.

== See also ==
- List of places in Cambridgeshire
