= Bourn Windmill =

Post mill in Cambridgeshire, England

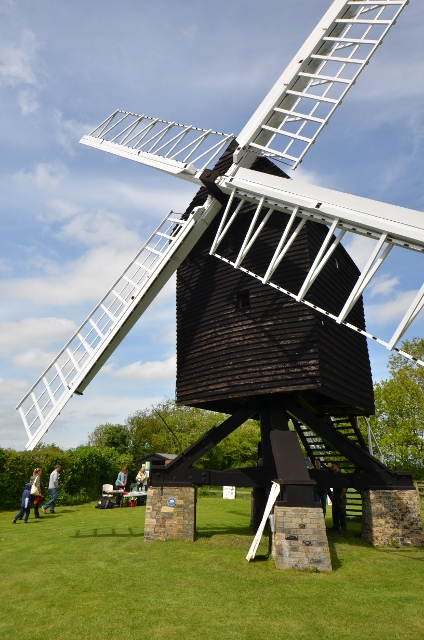
- Bourn Windmill, October 2006
- Interactive map of Bourn Windmill

Origin
- Mill name: Bourn Windmill
- Mill location: Bourn, Cambridgeshire
- Grid reference: TL 3118 5800
- Coordinates: 52°12′17″N 0°04′54″W
- Operators: Cambridge Past, Present and Future
- Year built: Early C17th.

Information
- Purpose: Corn mill
- Type: Open trestle post mill
- No. of sails: Four
- Type of sails: Two Common sails, two Patent sails
- Windshaft: Wood, cast iron poll end
- Winding: Tailpole
- Auxiliary power: Oil engine (1924–27)
- No. of pairs of millstones: Two pairs

Bourn Windmill is an open trestle post mill at Bourn in Cambridgeshire, England, which was standing in 1636. It is a Grade I Listed building and a Scheduled Monument. It is the oldest surviving windmill in the United Kingdom. The mill ceased work commercially in 1927 and was preserved in 1932. In November 2021, it was placed on the Heritage at Risk Register as being in danger of collapse.

== History ==
The mill may date to the first quarter of the 16th century. The tree that forms the main post of the mill was felled at some point after 1515. The earliest record of the windmill at Bourn is in a deed of 1653, stating that John Cook had sold the mill to Thomas Cook in 1636. The 1653 deed conveyed the mill from Thomas Cook to William Smythe, a blacksmith from Caxton. In 1779, the mill was leased by John Butler, a farmer in Bourn. He bought the mill in 1799. Smythe died in 1832, leaving the mill to his niece Mary Heywood, of Huntingdon, and her husband Elieze. They sold the mill in 1836 to Joshua Hipwell, of Toft for £550. Hipwell died in 1866 and the mill passed to his son, William. It was then sold to Mr. Papworth but had been sold to Zaccheus Papworth by 1874, later passing to William Papworth and then George Papworth. The mill worked by wind until 1924, when an oil engine was installed as auxiliary power. It ceased working commercially in 1927. The mill may be the oldest surviving windmill in the United Kingdom. However, Pitstone Windmill in Buckinghamshire may predate 1627 and be older than Bourn Windmill.

The mill was purchased from Mr Pentelow for £45 in 1931 by Alfred Bossom and Mansfield Forbes. The three funded its repair, which was undertaken by Hunt Bros., the Soham millwrights. On 3 June 1932, it was presented to the Cambridge Preservation Society. (Note: Now Cambridge Past, Present and Future) The handover ceremony was held at the mill, with musicians in Elizabethan costume. Don Quixote tilted at the windmill. The deeds were accepted by Mr. A. B. Ramsay, Master of Magdalene College, Cambridge and president of the society. Bottles of beer and cider were smashed on the mill's brick piers by Mrs. Bossom, and Miss Batten, Miss Lloyd and Miss Spring. (Note: Miss Batten was the author of a book on windmills: Batten, M. I. (1930). English Windmills, Vol. 1 - Kent, Surrey, Sussex. London: Architectural Press. She was also the secretary of the Windmill Section of the Society for the Protection of Ancient Buildings.) A model of the mill, with four Common sails, was made by Rex Wailes and placed on exhibition in the Children's Gallery of the Science Museum, London. Extensive repairs were undertaken in 1965.

The mill is a Grade I listed building and a Scheduled Monument. Between 2000 and 2004, the mill was restored at a cost of £46,000, of which the Heritage Lottery Fund donated £38,300, Waste Recycling Environmental donated £7,200 and South Cambridgeshire District Council donated £720. In October 2020, rot was discovered in the mill's crosstrees. Repairs made in the 1980s infilling rotten cavities with cement had allowed rain into the timbers. An appeal was launched by Cambridge Past, Present and Future for the cost of repairs estimated to be in excess of £50,000. Scaffolding was placed around the mill whilst repairs were carried out. In November 2021, it was reported that the mill had been added to Historic England's Heritage at Risk Register. The entry on the register states that a grant had been awarded for project development and emergency propping. In April 2022, it was reported that only £10,000 more needed to be raised to fund the restoration of the mill - The National Lottery Heritage Fund had awarded £148,456; Historic England had given a grant of £54,000 and the public had donated over £20,000. Architect Norman Foster gave his support to the scheme. He had drawn the mill as a student at Manchester University. Following restoration, the mill reopened in April 2023.

== Description ==
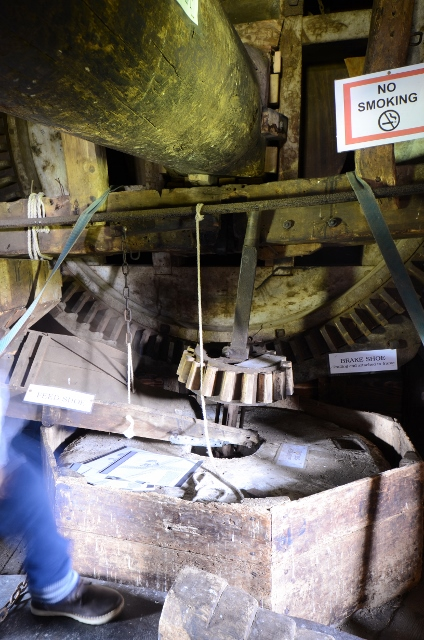
The stone floor, showing the wooden windshaft, brake wheel and headstones

Bourn Mill is an open trestle post mill. The body measures 14 feet 6 inches (4.42 m) long by 10 feet 3 inches (3.12 m) wide. It having been extended at the tail to accommodate a bolter. The mill is 31 feet 6 inches (9.60 m) high at the ridge. The mill has four sails, two Commons and two Patents. These are carried on a wooden windshaft with a cast iron poll end. (Note: Per photographs in this article) They drive two pairs of millstones, arranged head and tail.

== Notes and references ==
=== Bibliography ===
- Brown, R. J. (1976). Windmills in England. London: Robert Hale. ISBN 0 7091 5641 3.
- Coles Finch, William (1933). Watermills and Windmills. London: C. W. Daniel.
- Wailes, Rex (1954). The English Windmill. London: Routledge & Kegan Paul.
