= Wimpole Road =

Wimpole Road (not to be confused with Wimpole Street) is named after the village of Wimpole and may refer to:

- Part of the A603 in Cambridgeshire, running through Barton
- Wimpole Road in Great Eversden, Cambridgeshire
- Wimpole Road in Colchester, Essex
- Part of the Princes Freeway
