= Chittering =

Chittering may refer to:

- Chittering, Cambridgeshire, England
- Chittering, Western Australia
- Shire of Chittering, Western Australia
