= Westley Waterless =

Village in Cambridgeshire, England

Coordinates: 52.1809°N 0.3685°E

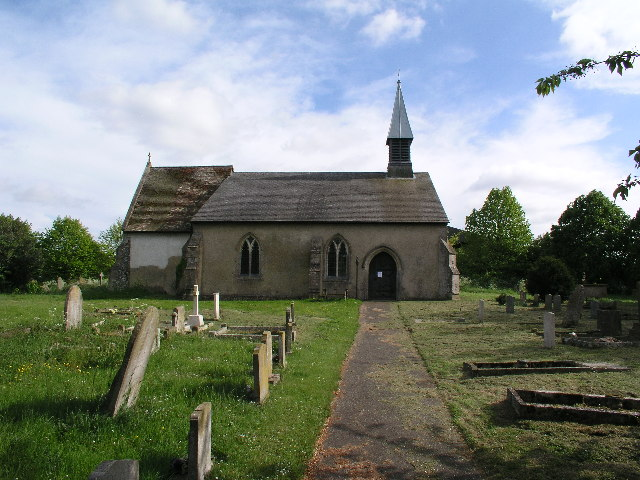

- Location within Cambridgeshire
- Population: 155 (2001); 132 (2011)
- OS grid reference: TL620562
- District: East Cambridgeshire
- Shire county: Cambridgeshire
- Region: East
- Country: England
- Sovereign state: United Kingdom
- Post town: Newmarket
- Postcode district: CB8
- Dialling code: 01638
- Police: Cambridgeshire
- Fire: Cambridgeshire
- Ambulance: East of England

Westley Waterless is a small village and civil parish in East Cambridgeshire, England, 5 miles south west of Newmarket.

== History ==
The parish of Westley Waterless is long and thin covering 1150 acres between the ancient Icknield Way at its north west end (now the A1304), to the village of Burrough Green at the south east. It is wedged between the parishes of Burrough Green to the north and east (with the border following Westley Bottom Road), from which it was apparently carved, and Brinkley to the south. It has a short border with Bottisham at its north west tip.

The site of the present village seems to have been occupied since the 10th century. A leaden vessel filled with tools dating from prior to the Norman Conquest has been found. Thirteen inhabitants were recorded at the time of the Domesday Book. The population reached its peak of 214 in 1851.

Listed as Westle in around 1045, Weslai in the Domesday Book and Westle Waterles in 1285, the name "Westley" means "westerly wood or clearing", and the "waterless" comes from the Old English "water + leas" meaning "wet clearings".

== Church ==
A church was recorded in the village in the 12th century. The oldest part of the present flint building, dedicated to St Mary, is the chancel dating from the 13th century. The chancel arch and three-bay nave date from the 14th century. The church formerly had a round west tower, the oldest part of the church until it fell in 1855.

The church contains a notable early brass dating from 1324 commemorating Sir John de Creke and his first wife Alyne Clopton.

== Village life ==
The village no longer contains a pub. The one former pub was the Trace-horse, which opened in the early 20th century, and was renamed the White Horse by 1937, but had closed by 1976.

== See also ==
- Six Mile Bottom
