= Caldecote, South Cambridgeshire =

Village and civil parish in England

Coordinates: 52.20°N 0.026°W

Caldecote
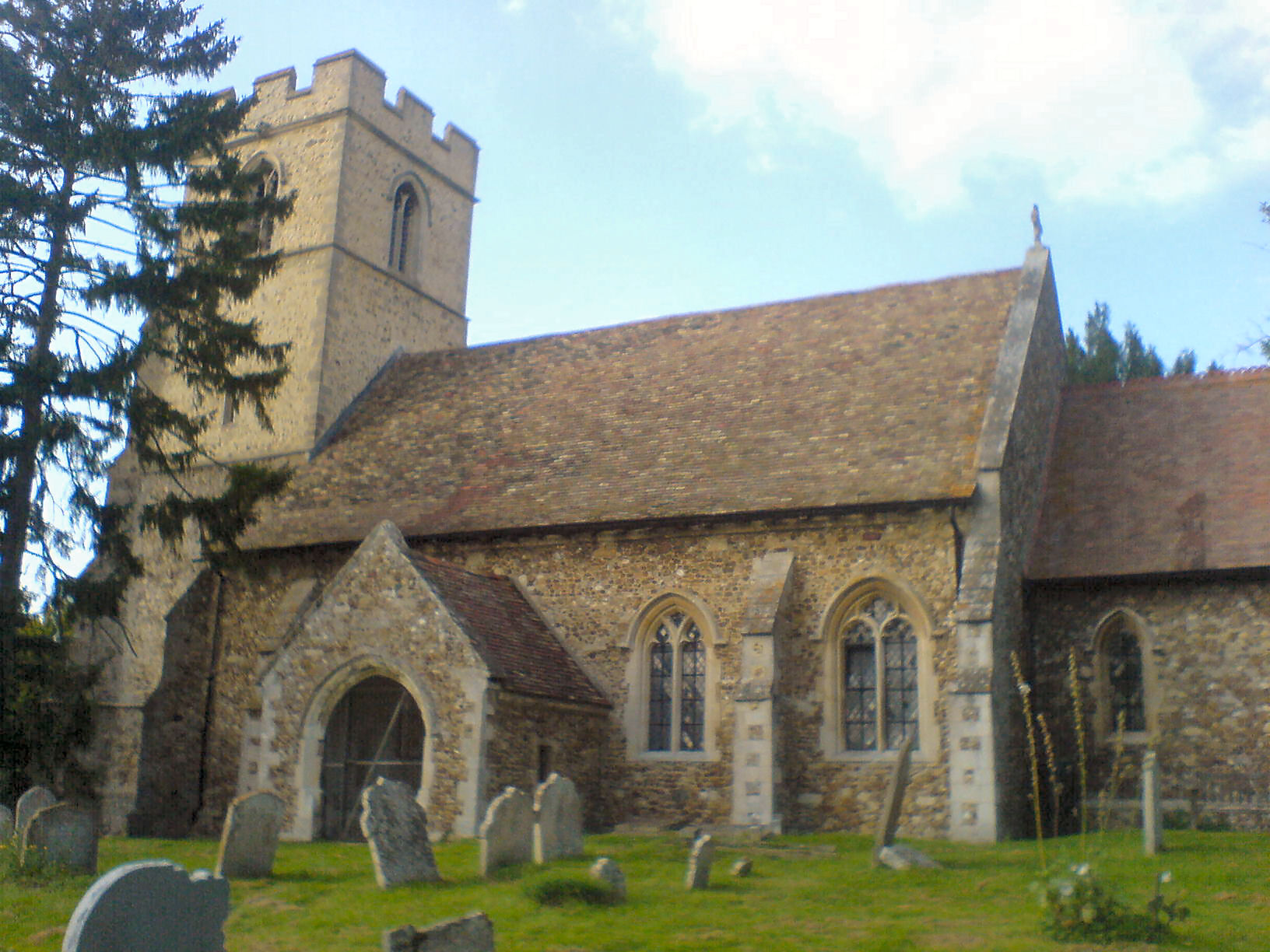
- St Michael and All Angels Church

- Location within Cambridgeshire
- Population: 1,737 (Including Childerley)(2011 Census)
- OS grid reference: TL349575
- District: South Cambridgeshire
- Shire county: Cambridgeshire
- Region: East
- Country: England
- Sovereign state: United Kingdom
- Post town: CAMBRIDGE
- Postcode district: CB23
- Dialling code: 01954 (Highfields) 01223 (Caldecote)
- Police: Cambridgeshire
- Fire: Cambridgeshire
- Ambulance: East of England
- UK Parliament: South Cambridgeshire

Caldecote is a village and civil parish in Cambridgeshire, in the district of South Cambridgeshire, England. It lies south of the A428, approximately six miles west of Cambridge and three miles east of Cambourne.

Nearby settlements are Hardwick and Toft to the east, Bourn to the west, Childerley to the north and Kingston to the south. Bourn Airfield lies on the north-west edge of the village.

== History ==
The older part of the village lies to the south, just off the B1046 road and is mentioned in the Domesday Book of 1086. Its origins have been speculated to have been as a hamlet of neighbouring Bourn, of which it was part of the same parish of in the 12th century. The parish church, St. Michael and All Angels, parts of which date to the 14th century, is in this part of the village. Bourn Brook and the route of the former Oxford and Cambridge Railway run to the south of the village.

== Highfields Caldecote ==
Highfields Caldecote is a newer development in the north of the village. The A428 was converted to a dual carriageway and was opened in 2007, allowing easier access.

The development in Highfields led to a rapid increase in the population of Caldecote from an estimated 800 in 2001 to 1,737 in 2011. As of 2021 it had a population of 2,050. The village contains amenities including a beauty salon and a social club.

== Economy ==
The village was home to the headquarters of the Raspberry Pi Foundation, a charity known worldwide for developing the Raspberry Pi computer system.

== Education ==
Caldecote Primary school was built in 1963 in the HIghfields part of the village. Prior to this, children from the village had been educated in Toft.
