= CB postcode area =

Postcode area in Cambridgeshire, England

Cambridge
- Postcode area
- Coordinates: 52.208°N 0.211°E
- Country: United Kingdom
- Postcode area: CB
- Postcode area name: Cambridge
- Post towns: 5
- Postcode districts: 16
- Postcode sectors: 83
- Postcodes (live): 10,542
- Postcodes (total): 19,101
- Statistics as at May 2020

The CB postcode area, also known as the Cambridge postcode area, is a group of sixteen postcode districts in the east of England, within five post towns. These cover much of south and east Cambridgeshire (including Cambridge and Ely), plus parts of west Suffolk (including Newmarket and Haverhill) and north-west Essex (including Saffron Walden), and a very small part of Norfolk.

Districts CB21 to CB25 were formed in September 2006 from the parts of districts CB1 to CB5 lying outside of the city of Cambridge.

== Coverage ==
The approximate coverage of the postcode districts:

Postcode district	Post town	Coverage	Local authority area(s)
CB1	CAMBRIDGE	Cambridge (Central, South), Teversham (parts of)	Cambridge; South Cambridgeshire
CB2	CAMBRIDGE	Cambridge (West)	Cambridge; South Cambridgeshire
CB3	CAMBRIDGE	Cambridge (North-West), Girton	Cambridge; South Cambridgeshire
CB4	CAMBRIDGE	Cambridge (North)	Cambridge; South Cambridgeshire
CB5	CAMBRIDGE	Cambridge (East)	Cambridge; South Cambridgeshire
CB6	ELY	Ely (west), Aldreth, Apes Hall, Black Horse Drove, Chettisham, Coveney, Haddenham, Little Downham, Little Thetford, Littleport, Mepal, Pymore, Stretham, Sutton, Wardy Hill, Wentworth, Wilburton, Witcham, Witchford	East Cambridgeshire; King's Lynn and West Norfolk
CB7	ELY	Ely (east and city centre), Barway, Brandon Bank, Brandon Creek, Broad Hill, Chippenham, Down Field, Fordham, Isleham, Prickwillow, Queen Adelaide, River Bank, Soham, Stuntney, Upware, Wicken	East Cambridgeshire
CB8	NEWMARKET	Newmarket, Ashley, Brinkley, Burrough End, Burrough Green, Carlton, Cheveley, Clopton Green, Cowlinge, Dalham, Denston, Ditton Green, Dullingham, Dunstall Green, Exning, Gazeley, Great Bradley, Kennett, Kentford, Kirtling, Kirtling Green, Lady's Green, Landwade, Lidgate, Moulton, Ousden, Saxon Street, Six Mile Bottom, Snailwell, Stetchworth, Stradishall, Thorns, Upend, Westley Waterless, Wickhambrook, Woodditton	West Suffolk; East Cambridgeshire; South Cambridgeshire
CB9	HAVERHILL	Haverhill, Barnardiston, Great Thurlow, Great Wratting, Helions Bumpstead, Kedington, Little Bradley, Little Thurlow, Little Wratting, Steeple Bumpstead, Sturmer, Withersfield	West Suffolk; Braintree
CB10	SAFFRON WALDEN	Saffron Walden (north and town centre), Ashdon, Church End, Great Chesterford, Great Sampford, Hempstead, Hinxton, Howlett End, Ickleton, Little Chesterford, Little Sampford, Little Walden, Radwinter, Red Oaks Hill, Sewards End, Wimbish, Wimbish Green	Uttlesford; South Cambridgeshire
CB11	SAFFRON WALDEN	Saffron Walden (south), Arkesden, Audley End, Clavering, Debden, Debden Green, Duddenhoe End, Elmdon, Langley, Littlebury, Littlebury Green, Newport, Pond Street, Quendon, Rickling, Rickling Green, Shortgrove, Starling's Green, Strethall, Upper Green, Wendens Ambo, Wicken Bonhunt, Widdington	Uttlesford
CB21	CAMBRIDGE	Abington, Balsham, Bartlow, Castle Camps, Fulbourn, Great Wilbraham, Hadstock, Hildersham, Horseheath, Linton, Little Abington, Little Wilbraham, Shudy Camps, Teversham (parts of), Weston Colville, West Wickham, West Wratting	South Cambridgeshire; Uttlesford
CB22	CAMBRIDGE	Babraham, Barrington, Duxford, Foxton, Great Shelford, Harston, Hauxton, Little Shelford, Newton, Pampisford, Sawston, Stapleford, Whittlesford	South Cambridgeshire
CB23	CAMBRIDGE	Bar Hill, Barton, Bourn, Boxworth, Caxton, Comberton, Conington, Coton, Dry Drayton, Elsworth, Great Cambourne, Great Eversden, Hardwick, Harlton, Haslingfield, Highfields Caldecote, Kingston, Knapwell, Little Eversden, Lolworth, Longstowe, Lower Cambourne, Madingley, Papworth Everard, Papworth St Agnes, Toft, Upper Cambourne	South Cambridgeshire; Cambridge
CB24	CAMBRIDGE	Cottenham, Fen Drayton, Histon, Impington, Longstanton, Milton, Northstowe, Oakington, Over, Rampton, Swavesey, Willingham	South Cambridgeshire
CB25	CAMBRIDGE	Bottisham, Burwell, Chittering, Cottenham (parts of), Horningsea, Landbeach, Lode, Reach, Stow cum Quy, Swaffham Bulbeck, Swaffham Prior, Waterbeach	South Cambridgeshire; East Cambridgeshire

== Map ==
Postcode districts of Cambridge superimposed on its electoral boundaries

CB postcode area map, showing postcode districts in red and post towns in grey text, with links to nearby CM, CO, IP, PE and SG postcode areas.

== See also ==
- List of postcode areas in the United Kingdom
- Postcode Address File
