= Black Horse Drove =

Hamlet in Cambridgeshire, England

Coordinates: 52.494°N 0.356°E

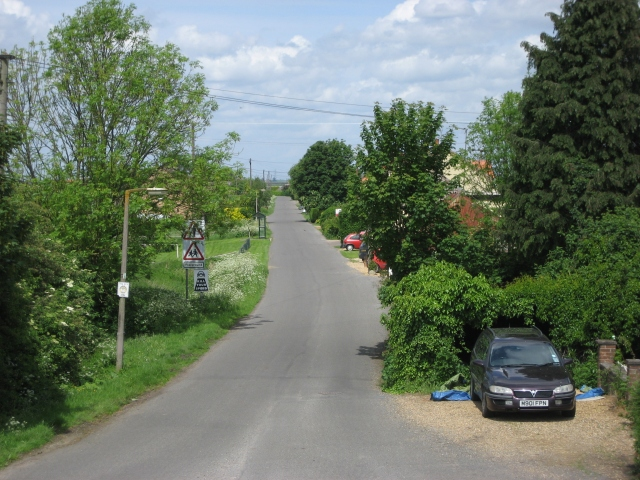
- Black Horse Drove viewed from the junction with Ten Mile Bank

- Location within Cambridgeshire
- OS grid reference: TL601911
  - London: 71 miles (114 km)
- District: East Cambridgeshire
- Shire county: Cambridgeshire
- Region: East
- Country: England
- Sovereign state: United Kingdom
- Post town: Ely
- Postcode district: CB6
- UK Parliament: North East Cambridgeshire

Black Horse Drove is a linear hamlet that lies 7 miles (11 km) north-north-east of Ely in Cambridgeshire, England, in the civil parish of Littleport. The hamlet is off the Ten Mile Bank, a long road which runs along the north-western bank of the river Great Ouse between Littleport and Southery in Norfolk. Black Horse Drove is in the Fens and much of the village is around 6 feet (1.8 m) below sea level.

The estimated population of Black Horse Drove in 2010 was 220, in 93 dwellings.

== Facilities ==
A Wesleyan chapel was built in 1843 and rebuilt in 1897 but it has now been converted to a private residence.

A school was built in Black Horse Drove c.1874 but due to overcrowding and its dangerous condition, a new school called the Coronation County Primary Junior and Infants School was built in 1937. The old school was used as a community centre until 2008 when it was acquired by Littleport Parish Council and then refurbished. The community centre re-opened on 15 October 2011.

The Black Horse public house was built c.1912 but has closed and is now a private residence.

In Black Horse Drove there is also a children's play area and a playing field.

== Transport ==
There is a weekly bus service on Thursday mornings which leaves at 09:30 to Littleport, Prickwillow and Ely and returns at around 13:30.

The nearest railway station is 5 miles (8 km) away at Littleport.
