= Little Walden =

Village in Essex, England

Coordinates: 52.050900°N 0.252650°E

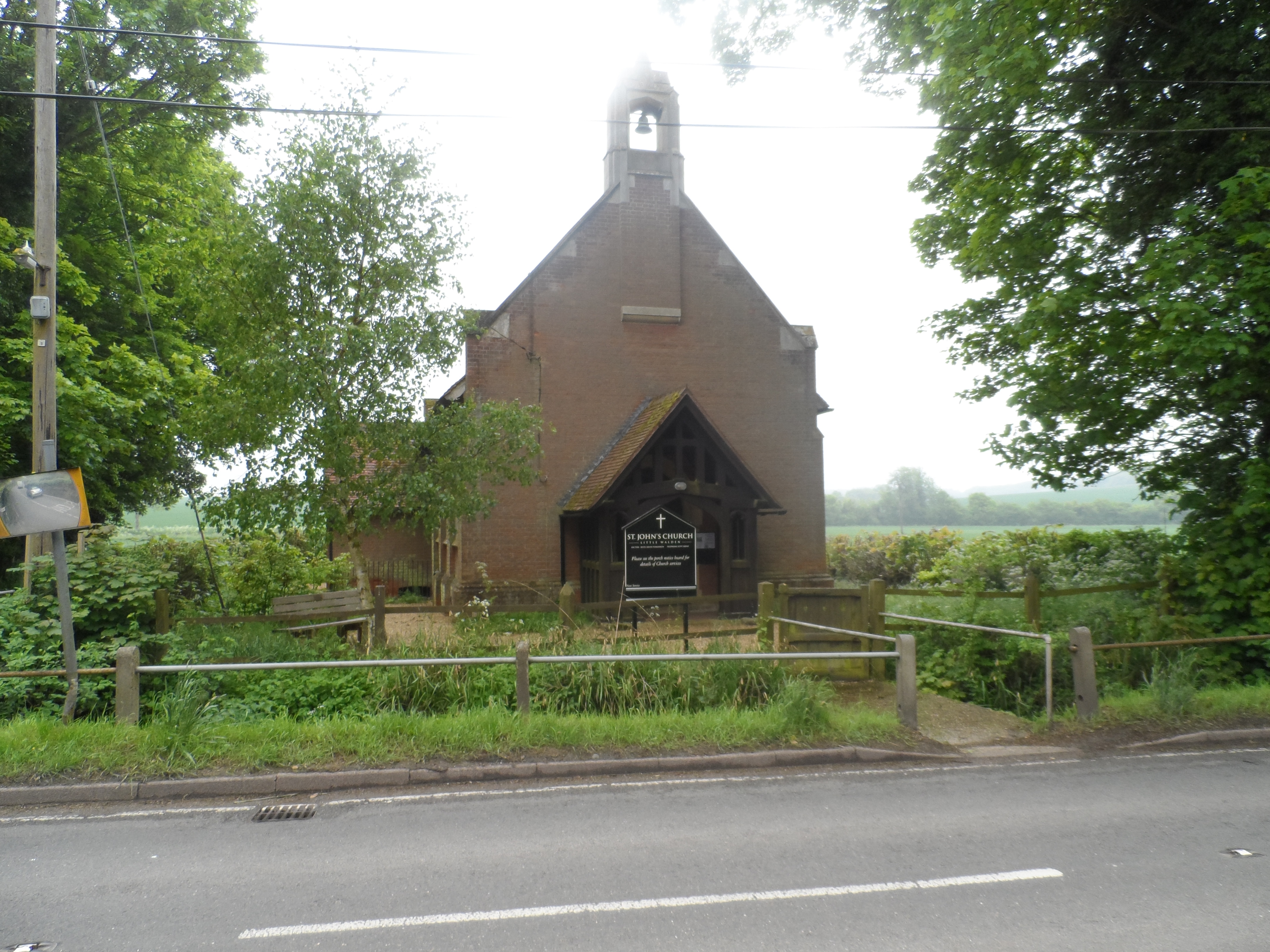
- St John's Church

- Location within Essex
- Civil parish: Saffron Walden
- District: Uttlesford
- Shire county: Essex
- Region: East
- Country: England
- Sovereign state: United Kingdom
- Post town: Saffron Walden
- Postcode district: CB10
- Dialling code: 01799
- Police: Essex
- Fire: Essex
- Ambulance: East of England
- UK Parliament: North West Essex

Little Walden is a village in the civil parish of Saffron Walden, in the Uttlesford district, in the county of Essex, England. It lies about 3 miles (5 km) north of the market town of Saffron Walden and is 12 miles (19 km) from Cambridge.

The church, St.John's is a "remnant of Victorian concern for the spiritual welfare of the very poor labourers who lived here then". The Crown Inn public house is situated on a bend in the B1052 road which runs through the village. Chesterford Research Park is 0.84 miles (1.35 km) to the north west.

== History ==
In Little Walden parish are the remains of a banked enclosure which may date from the Iron Age.

A World War II airfield to the north, RAF Little Walden, closed in 1958.

== Transport ==
A bus service between Linton and Saffron Walden calls at Little Walden (Tuesdays only).

The nearest railway station is Great Chesterford.
