= Chittering, Cambridgeshire =

Hamlet in Cambridgeshire, England

Coordinates: 52.30759°N 0.19519°E

Chittering
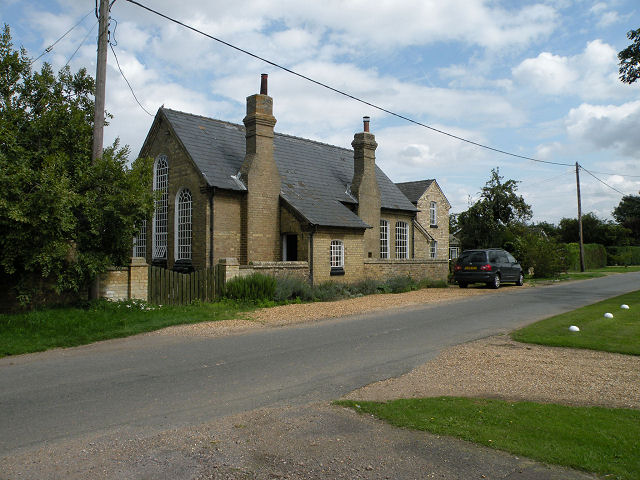
- The Old Schoolhouse, Chittering

- Location within Cambridgeshire
- OS grid reference: TL496700
- District: South Cambridgeshire
- Shire county: Cambridgeshire
- Region: East
- Country: England
- Sovereign state: United Kingdom
- Post town: CAMBRIDGE
- Postcode district: CB25
- Dialling code: 01223
- Police: Cambridgeshire
- Fire: Cambridgeshire
- Ambulance: East of England
- UK Parliament: South East Cambridgeshire

Chittering is a hamlet about 8 miles (13 km) north of Cambridge in Cambridgeshire, England. For administrative purposes it is part of the parish of Waterbeach. The population of the hamlet was included in the civil parish of Bottisham at the 2011 Census.

The village lies on the Ely Road (A10) between Waterbeach and Stretham. It has one pub, Paraiso Restaurant (formerly The Traveller's Rest). Another small settlement, Elford Closes, lies to the north of Chittering.

== History ==
Situated towards the southern end of The Fens, the marshes in the Chittering area were first settled in Roman times. Investigations around Causeway End Farm in Chittering Fen show evidence of dwellings and inclosed fields that were occupied from the early 2nd to the early 4th century. Denny Abbey, just to the south of the hamlet, was built in around 1150; it is now a museum open to the public.

The fenland around Chittering has been known as North Fen since at least the 14th century. Over the following centuries it was gradually divided into smaller areas, and Chittering Fen – so named by the early 15th century – covered an area of around 700 acres (280 ha) by the 19th century and was principally used for growing hay.

A school was built in the village to accommodate 54 children in 1877, but numbers had declined to only 19 by the start of the Second World War. The school closed in 1969.

The former micro-brewery, the City of Cambridge Brewery (originally located in Cheddars Lane, Cambridge), used a reedbed system to deal with its waste water, but brewing ceased on the site in 2007 and the remaining assets were sold off in 2011. There was a second pub in the area, the Plough and Horses, which was open from the 19th century until around 1900.

== See also ==
- List of places in Cambridgeshire
