= Carlton, Cambridgeshire =

Village and civil parish in England

Coordinates: 52.15°N 0.40°E

Carlton
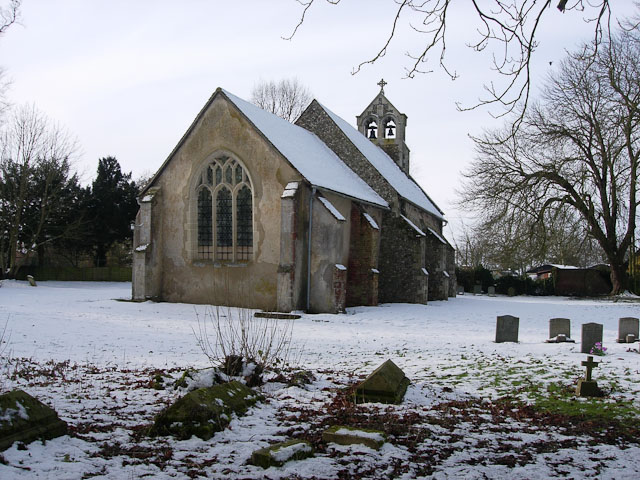
- Church of St Peter

- Location within Cambridgeshire
- Population: 166 (2001)
- OS grid reference: TL641531
- District: South Cambridgeshire
- Shire county: Cambridgeshire
- Region: East
- Country: England
- Sovereign state: United Kingdom
- Post town: NEWMARKET
- Postcode district: CB8
- Dialling code: 01223
- Police: Cambridgeshire
- Fire: Cambridgeshire
- Ambulance: East of England
- UK Parliament: Cambridgeshire South East
- Website: http://www.carlton-cambridgeshire.org.uk/

Carlton is a village and civil parish near the eastern boundary of the county of Cambridgeshire in the east of England. It is in the district of South Cambridgeshire. In 2001 the parish had a population of 166.

There are some pictures and a description of the church at the Cambridgeshire Churches website.

== History ==
On 1 April 1974 the parish was renamed from "Carlton cum Willingham" to "Carlton".

== Notable residents ==
The most famous historical resident of Carlton was the scholar, diplomat, and author Sir Thomas Elyot. He died and was buried in Carlton in 1546.
