= Conington, South Cambridgeshire =

Village in England

Coordinates: 52.277522°N 0.065704°W

Conington
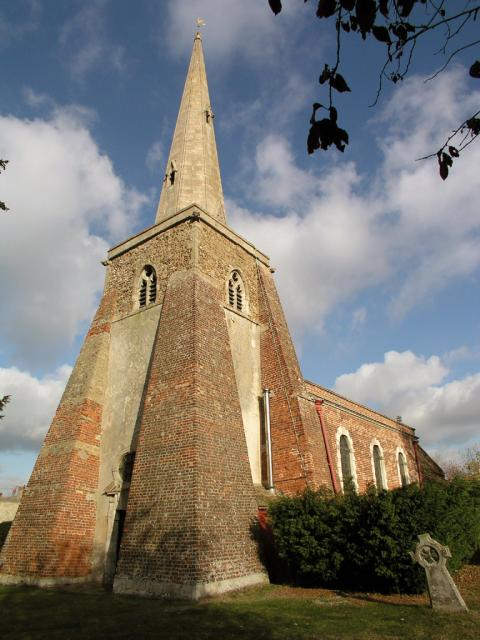
- Conington Church, showing its remarkable buttresses

- Location within Cambridgeshire
- OS grid reference: TL323663
- District: South Cambridgeshire
- Shire county: Cambridgeshire
- Region: East
- Country: England
- Sovereign state: United Kingdom
- Post town: Cambridge
- Postcode district: CB23

Conington (Conington St Mary, or Coningtom-juxta-Cantab) is a small village in the South Cambridgeshire district of Cambridgeshire with about 50 houses and 150 residents. The population of the village is included in the civil parish of Elsworth. It lies about five miles (8km) south-east of Huntingdon and one mile south of the A14 road. The church is dedicated to the Assumption of Mary. It has an oddly-buttressed steeple and houses one of the oldest bells in Britain, dated to around 1376. There are some pictures and a description of the church at the Cambridgeshire Churches website.

External videos
- Talk given by Richard Mortimer
- The Excavation of a Middle Anglo-Saxon 'King's Enclosure' at Conington

The village has two ponds, one next to the church and the other near the Manor House. The pond near the church used to be used as a splash pond for washing cart wheels. The pond near the Manor House used to supply water for Conington Hall. The pond is notoriously deep, and claimed the lives of two young boys in the Victorian era, when they attempted to learn to swim across it using a rope. The rope snapped, and the boys drowned. Today the pond is known locally as Big Tree Corner.

The village has a pub called The White Swan.
