= Weston Colville =

Village in Cambridgeshire, England

Coordinates: 52.153°N 0.362°E

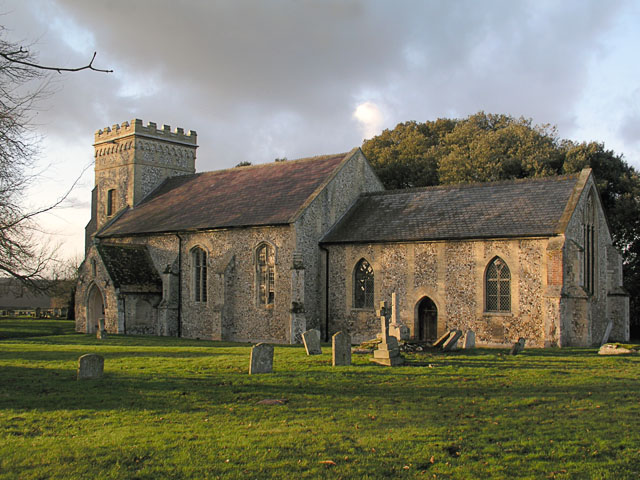
- Church of St Mary at Weston Colville

- Location within Cambridgeshire
- Population: 424 (2001); 451 (2011)
- Shire county: Cambridgeshire
- Region: East
- Country: England
- Sovereign state: United Kingdom
- Post town: CAMBRIDGE
- Postcode district: CB21
- Dialling code: 01223

Weston Colville is a village in South Cambridgeshire, England. The village is close to the border with Suffolk, 10 miles southeast of Cambridge and 6 miles south of Newmarket.

== History ==
The parish of Weston Colville forms a long thin area of 3235 acres stretching from just south of the A11 to the Suffolk border. It is wedged between the parishes of Carlton-cum-Willingham to the north and West Wratting to the south, and has a short border with both Great Wilbraham and Little Wilbraham to the northwest.

The site has been occupied since at least the 10th century, and there were 40 residents registered at the time of the Domesday Book. By 1150 the manor was owned by the Stutville family. After the death of Anselm de Stutville in around 1198, the land passed to his sister Beatrice, who married William de Colville, lord of Castle Bytham in around 1200. From then until 1708 the manor remained in the hands of the Colville family, who added their name to the village which was hitherto known only as Weston (meaning "west town").

Between 1943 and 1947 the flat area south-east of the village was used as a bomber airfield during the Second World War known as Wratting Common. The buildings there also housed 2000 foreign refugees at one time. The area returned to agricultural use after 1952.

J. R. Withers (1812–92), "the Cambridgeshire poet", was born at Weston Colville, son of the village shoemaker, though he lived at Fordham as an adult. A collection of James Withers' work is held at Cambridge University. A book of his poems is available online (https://www.ebooksread.com/authors-eng/j-r-james-reynolds-withers/poems-upon-various-subjects-ala/1-poems-upon-various-subjects-ala.shtml)

== Church ==
The parish church of St Mary consists of a chancel with north vestry, nave with south porch, and west tower. The nave dates from the 14th century, with the tower added in the 15th century. The external stone dressings were mainly replaced by grey brick in the 1820s.

== Village life ==
The population of the village is around 500. The village post office closed in December 2017 leaving few local services. There are no pubs remaining in the village. Former pubs include The Coopers Arms which opened in the late 18th century, The Three Horseshoes, north of Weston Green, which ran from 1800 until closing in 1957, and The Fox and Hounds south of the green, open in the mid-19th century, rebuilt in around 1940, but closed in the late 20th century. The Reading Room hosts local events, classes and a nursery and the village has a cricket club where Essex and England cricketer Tom Westley began his career.
