= Shudy Camps =

Village in Cambridgeshire, England

Coordinates: 52.075°N 0.362°E

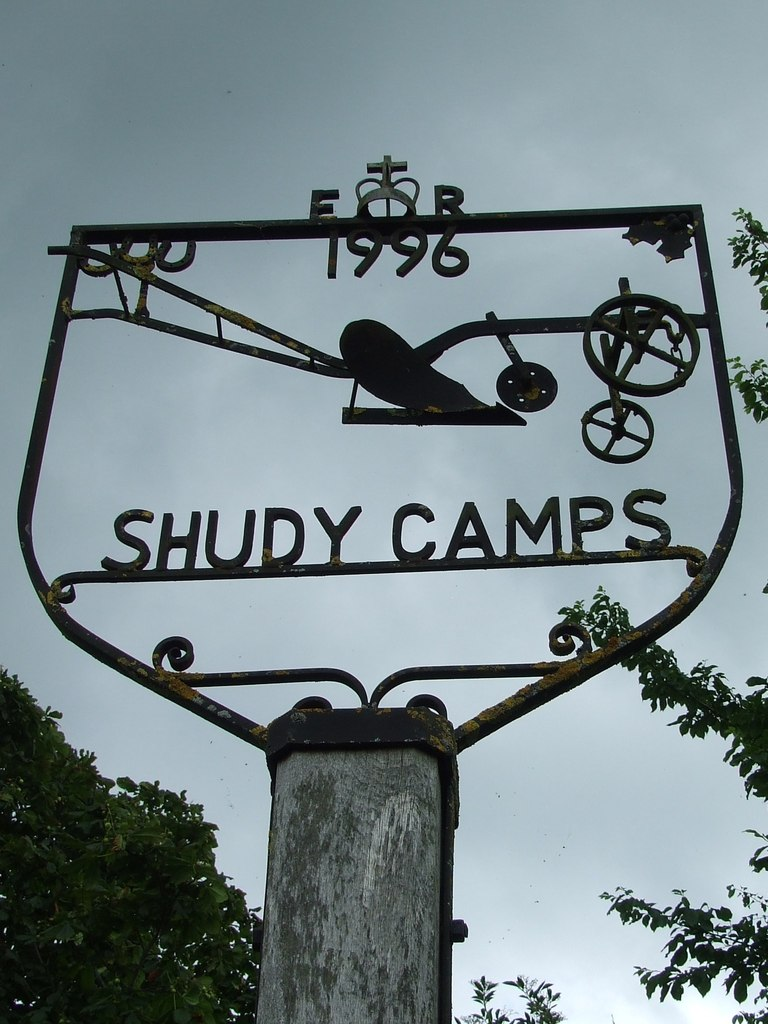
- Village sign

- Location within Cambridgeshire
- Population: 299 (2021 Census)
- OS grid reference: TL622417
- Shire county: Cambridgeshire
- Region: East
- Country: England
- Sovereign state: United Kingdom
- Post town: Cambridge
- Postcode district: CB21

Shudy Camps is a village in the south-east corner of Cambridgeshire, England, near the border of Essex and Suffolk, and is part of the Chilford Hundred. As of 2021, the population was 299. The area of the village is 951 hectares (2,350 acres). It includes the nearby hamlet of Mill Green, a main street, Blacksmith's Lane and Parkway.

The highest point in the parish is 383' ASL at Mill Green.

== History ==
The parish of Shudy Camps lies 12 miles south-east of Cambridge and was, until about the 14th century, known as Little Camps. It is probable that settlement in the area began in small clearings in the woodland. The chance discovery of ancient grave sites on the south west slope of White Hills Field (part of Carters Farm) was reported by the Essex Archaeological Society. In 1933 it was decided to try and find these burial sites again, in order to date them and subsequently a further 148 burials were found and dated as the earliest form of Christian Saxon culture in the area.

== Toponymy ==
The name Shudy Camps is made up of two parts. Camp derives from Latin campus ('field') and is typically used to denote an enclosed piece of land. Shudy may derive from Middle English schudde ('shed').

== St Mary's Church ==
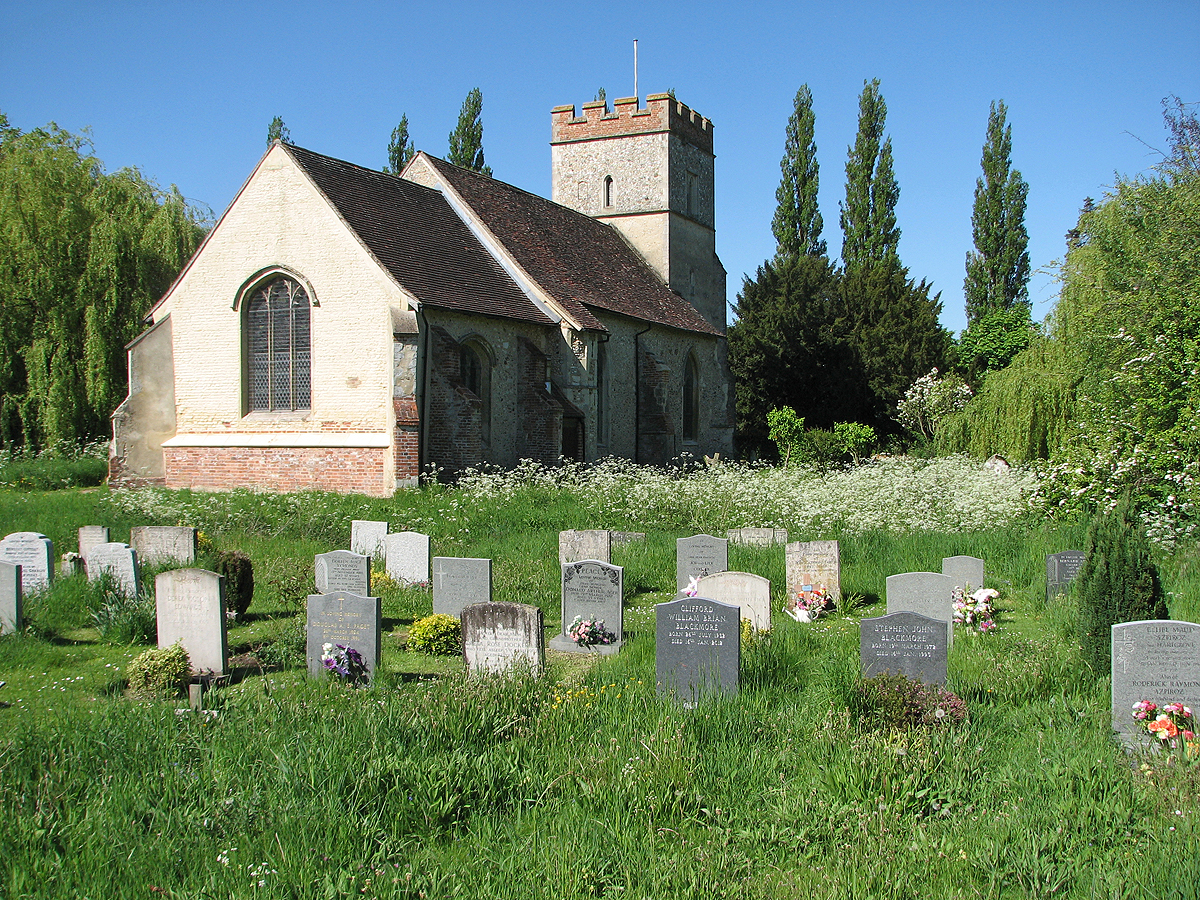
St Mary's Church

St Mary’s Church (CoE) is one of five parishes in the Linton Team Ministry (Linton, Bartlow, Castle Camps, Horseheath and Shudy Camps). The church of St Mary, so called from c. 1200, consists of a chancel, nave with south porch, and west tower, and is built of field stones with ashlar dressings. Fragments of 12th-century carvings have been re-used in the walls, and the south doorway of the chancel is probably 13th-century. That of the nave, perhaps 14th-century, retains the original door under modern boarding, and the porch has medieval roof-beams. The three-storey tower, its upper portion mostly rebuilt in brick though including the earlier belfry windows, has a 14th-century west window, in whose spandrels are carved much-worn figures of the Virgin and Child and of a knight. The nave was apparently widened to the south in the 15th century, leaving the chancel off-centre. Its three-light windows, the western pair renewed, have complicated tracery. The chancel and chancel arch date from later in that century, as do the three-light windows under depressed arches. The plain nave roof is thought to date from c. 1500.
