= Brinkley, Cambridgeshire =

Village in Cambridgeshire, England

Coordinates: 52.165°N 0.381°E

Brinkley
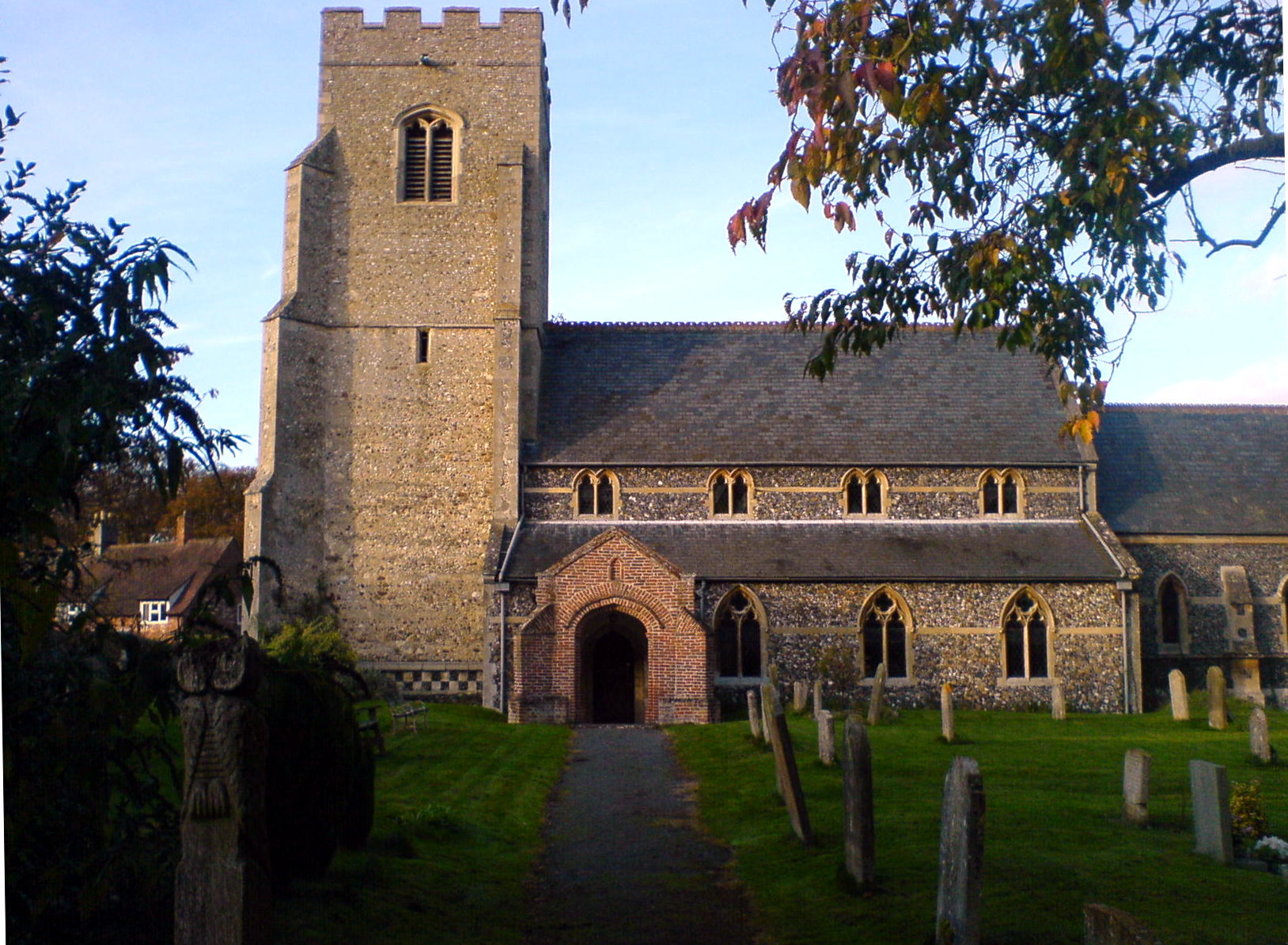
- St Mary's Church, south side

- Location within Cambridgeshire
- Population: 391 (2011)
- OS grid reference: TL630546
- District: East Cambridgeshire
- Shire county: Cambridgeshire
- Region: East
- Country: England
- Sovereign state: United Kingdom
- Post town: NEWMARKET
- Postcode district: CB8
- Dialling code: 01638
- Police: Cambridgeshire
- Fire: Cambridgeshire
- Ambulance: East of England
- UK Parliament: Cambridgeshire South East

Brinkley is a small village in Cambridgeshire, England. It is situated about 15 miles east of Cambridge and 5 miles south of Newmarket, the horse racing centre. It features a pub, The Brinkley Lion, but its post office closed down in the 1990s. Children go to school in the neighbouring village, Burrough Green.

The local church is St Mary's Church. Most of it dates from around 1600 but some parts of it are older. It has a beautiful east window (the tower is at the west end) which is thought to date from around 1300 so it is likely there was probably a building here much earlier. The rectors of Brinkley are recorded back to 1260. There have been around 50 since then.

From time to time the residents invite everyone with the surname Brinkley to come to the village fete, which is held in July each year in the grounds of Brinkley Hall, next to the church. The last time this happened was in July 2000 when 250 Brinkleys from all over the world turned out.
