= Childerley =

Former villages in Cambridgeshire, England

Coordinates: 52.2367°N 0.0175°W

- Site of two depopulated villages
- Location within Cambridgeshire
- OS grid reference: TL3536061730
- Shire county: Cambridgeshire
- Region: East
- Country: England
- Sovereign state: United Kingdom
- Post town: Cambridge
- Postcode district: CB23
- Police: Cambridgeshire
- Fire: Cambridgeshire
- Ambulance: East of England

Great Childerley and Little Childerly, were small rural villages in the county of Cambridgeshire in the East of England. The population is included in the civil parish of Caldecote.

== Village history ==
Childerley is mentioned in the Domesday Book of 1086. Childerley Hall was built by Sir John Cutts after clearing and depopulating the two existing villages of Great Childerley and Little Childerley. There were originally two churches in Childerley, one of which was dedicated to St Mary. Both were demolished by Sir John Cutts. Queen Elizabeth I is recorded as having sent the Spanish Ambassador to stay with Sir John Cutts at the Hall.
