= Harlton =

Village in Cambridgeshire, England

Coordinates: 52.151°N 0.028°E

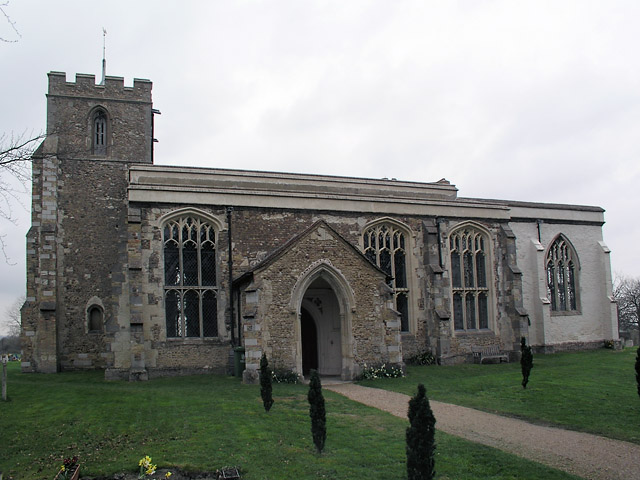
- Harlton, Assumption of the Blessed Virgin Mary

- Location within Cambridgeshire
- Population: 303; 308 (2011 Census)
- OS grid reference: TL387523
- District: South Cambridgeshire
- Shire county: Cambridgeshire
- Region: East
- Country: England
- Sovereign state: United Kingdom
- Post town: CAMBRIDGE
- Postcode district: CB23
- Dialling code: 01223

Harlton is a village and civil parish in Cambridgeshire, England. The village is 5 miles (8.0 km) south-west of Cambridge and neighbours Haslingfield.

== History ==
The parish of Harlton covers an area of 1,261 acres (510 ha). Its southern border is marked by the ancient track Mare Way, which runs along a raised ridge dividing it from Barrington (plus a short border with Orwell). The Bourn Brook forms its northern boundary with Comberton, and its western border with Little Eversden mostly follows the Roman Road (now the A603). Field boundaries and old water channels divide it from Haslingfield to the east. There is a very short border with Barton at its north-eastern tip.

In a hypothesis, the valley of the Bourn Brook, Cambridgeshire is put forward as the location of the Battle of Brunanburh fought in 937. The battle, the location of which is unknown and has been speculated to have taken place in over 40 locations from South West England to Scotland, is suggested to have taken place close to the brook, on the open fields of Haslingfield, Harlton and Little Eversden.

The village was an important source of mining for many centuries. The pits to the south east of the village were used to mine the clunch that was used to build Cambridge Castle in 1295. The quarry was last used for building material in 1906 and it is now a heavily wooded recreation area. The clay quarry to the south-west of the village was known as the Lady Quarry from the 15th century but is now filled in. Gravel was mined alongside the Bourn Brook from at least the 15th century, and coprolite digging provided employment for the second half of the 19th century.

The village had one of the smallest populations in the Wetherley hundred in medieval times, with 20 residents listed in 1086, and 74 in 1676. The census of 1801 listed 156 residents and the coprolite employment caused an increase to a peak of 335 in 1871. It fell to 201 by 1931 and has risen slowly since.

The Cambridge to Bedford railway line reached the parish in the 1860s with Lord's Bridge railway station opening in 1862, closing in 1968 as part of the Beeching Axe. In 1938 the Air Ministry took land south-east of the Roman Road for an ammunition dump with new sidings added to the railway line. It closed in 1955 and in 1957 the Cavendish Laboratory of Cambridge University built the Mullard Radio Astronomy Observatory there. The land was bought from the Ministry of Defence in 1971 and the section of the railway line there was used to carry a number of mobile radio telescope dishes.

Listed as Herletone in the Domesday Book of 1086 the village's name means "farmstead of a man called Herela".

The Manor House was listed as 'Huntingfield Manor' in the 1300s on the British History Online website.

== Church ==
The parish church of the Assumption of the Blessed Virgin Mary was built to replace an earlier building in the late 14th century. It comprises a chancel with north vestry, aisled and clerestoried nave with north and south porches, and west tower. Some 14th and 15th-century glass remains and there are 16th-century stalls. The tower contains three bells.

The wood-engraver Gwen Raverat has a memorial at the church as family and friends donated to its restoration in her memory. It is believed the wood block print by Raverat, 'Harvest Feast' was based on The Manor Barn in Harlton.

== Village life ==
The village retains a public house, the Hare and Hounds, which has been open since at least 1879. The Wheatsheaf pub which was open where the Eversden road crosses the Roman Road from at least 1833 is now La Pergola Italian restaurant and pub. Former pubs include The Red Lion on High Street, open from the early 19th century to 1960, and The Railway Inn, near Lord's Bridge station, open by 1886 and closed by 1966.

The village had a school from at least 1601, and a dedicated schoolroom was built in 1816, with a larger one replacing it in 1853. The school moved to accepting primary children only in 1920 with the older children attending Haslingfield, and by the Second World War the attendance was only 16. The school closed in 1959. Primary children now attend Haslingfield Primary School, and secondary children go to Comberton Village College.

Harlton has a cricket team who play during the summer months. Harlton CC compete in the CCA Junior League 3 West and play their home games at the Harlton Oval (known as the Angry Wasp Oval for sponsorship reasons).
