= Burrough Green =

Village in Cambridgeshire, England

Coordinates: 52.17°N 0.4°E

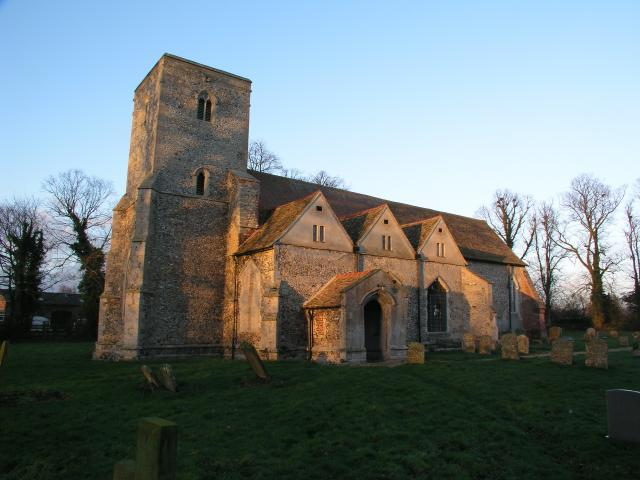
- Burrough Green church

- Location within Cambridgeshire
- Population: 378 (2011)
- OS grid reference: TL641548
- Shire county: Cambridgeshire
- Region: East
- Country: England
- Sovereign state: United Kingdom
- Post town: Newmarket
- Postcode district: CB8
- Website: http://www.burroughgreenparishcouncil.org.uk

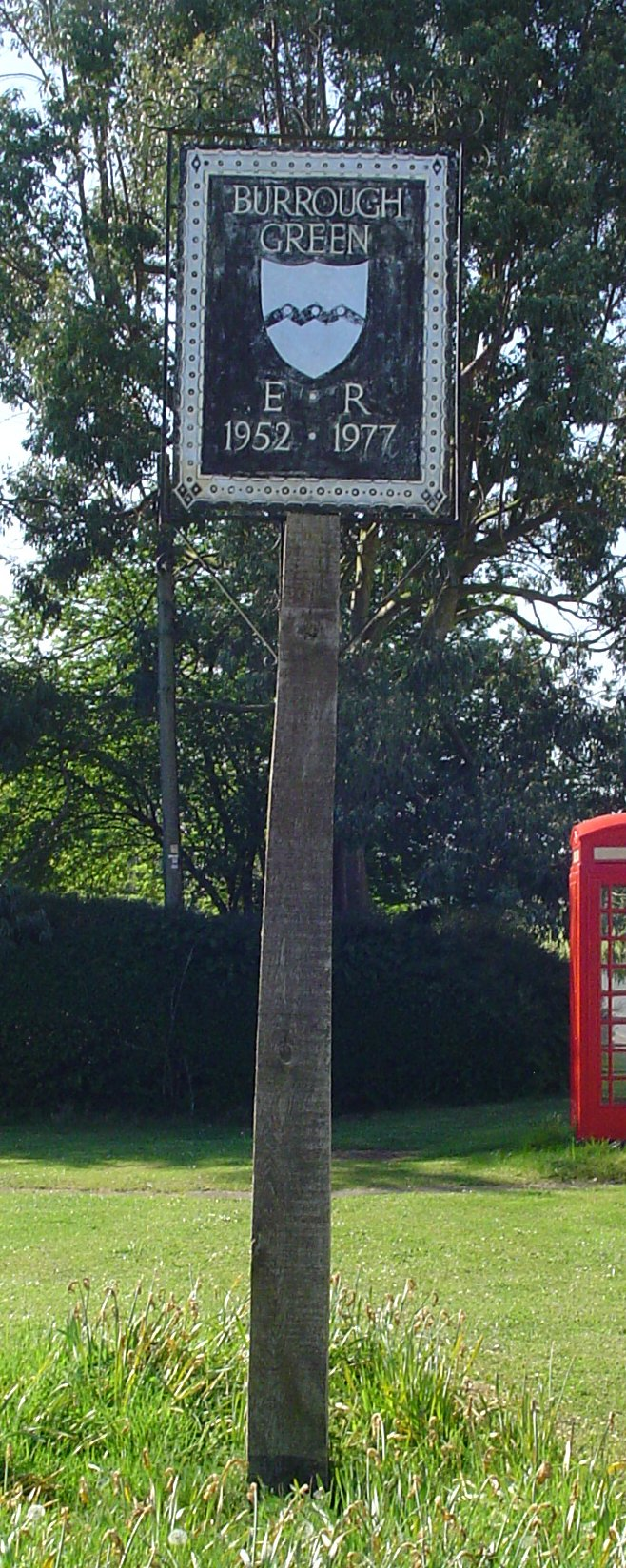
Signpost in Burrough Green

Burrough Green is a village and parish in Cambridgeshire, England. The population of the village at the 2011 census was 378. The soil is various; subsoil, clay and chalk. The chief crops are wheat, barley and roots. The area of the parish is 2,272 acres (919 ha); the population in 1921 was 334."

It is described in Kelly's Directory (1929) as a "village and parish 2½ miles south-east from Dullingham station on the Cambridge and Bury branch of the London and North Eastern Railway and 6 south from Newmarket, in the hundred of Radfield, Newmarket union, petty sessional division and county court district, rural deanery of Cheveley, archdeaconry and diocese of Ely."

== Church ==
The parish church of Church of St Augustine is a Grade II* Listed Building which dates from the 13th century.

== Manor ==
Sir Thomas de Burgh (d.1199) was Lord of the Manor in the 12th century and the family were still in possession in the 14th century. Sir John de Burgh of Borrough Green in Cambridgeshire is a legatee in the Will of William de Ufford, Earl of Suffolk, proved at Lambeth on 24 February 1381/2. De Burgh's own Will was made in 1384 and he is said to be buried in a fine tomb in the church at Burrough Green. Upon the death of Sir John's son Sir Thomas, without issue, the manor passed via Sir John's eldest daughter Elizabeth to her husband Sir John Inglethorpe, Knt., in whose family it remained until about 1500. Burrough Green was sold to Sir Anthony Cage in 1574, whose descendants became greatly indebted during the Civil War. The manor and its lands passed by marriage to the Slingsby family and in 1670 Burrough Green was their seat. Thereafter numerous owners possessed the manor and village and over time the lands and houses were sold.

The Manor House (or Old Hall), built c. 1575 replacing one which existed as early as 1086, stands near the church and is now a farmhouse, being remodelled as such in the nineteenth century.

== Other ==
Burrough Green Primary School has been in existence for over 400 years. It provides an education for around 100 children. There is also an after school club and a nursery on site. The school uses the reading room mentioned above for lunch times and also has a small swimming pool.

The Reading Room at Burrough Green was built in 1887 by Mrs Porcher, as a memorial to her husband, Charles Porcher esq.; it is in general use during the winter months and will hold about 130 persons.

The Icknield Way Path passes through the village on its 110-mile journey from Ivinghoe Beacon in Buckinghamshire to Knettishall Heath in Suffolk. The Icknield Way Trail, a multi-user route for walkers, horse riders and off-road cyclists also passes through the village.

There is also a cricket club in the village which plays on the village green and competes with other local villages.
