= Great Eversden =

Village in Cambridgeshire, England

Coordinates: 52.1632°N 0.0078°W

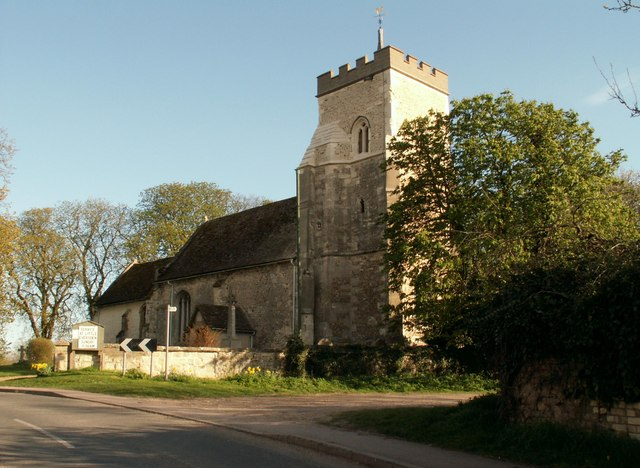
- Parish church St. Mary

- Location within Cambridgeshire
- Population: 227; 241 (2011 Census)
- OS grid reference: TL356539
- Shire county: Cambridgeshire
- Region: East
- Country: England
- Sovereign state: United Kingdom
- Post town: CAMBRIDGE
- Postcode district: CB23
- Dialling code: 01223

Great Eversden is a village 6 miles south-west of Cambridge, England. The population of the civil parish at the 2011 Census was 241. The Prime Meridian runs through the parish just to the east of the village, separating it from Little Eversden.

Great Eversden is a small village of about 85 houses. It broadly takes the shape of a cross, with the Harlton to Kingston road forming the East and West arms (called Church Street and the High Street), and the no-through-roads of Chapel Road and Wimpole Road forming the North and South arms.

== History ==
The history of Great Eversden is closely related to that of its neighbour Little Eversden, though the two have formed distinct parishes since at least the 13th century. The parish of Great Eversden, covering 1400 acres, lies between the Bourn Brook to the north and Mare Way, the ancient ridgeway, to the south. Little Eversden lies to the east of the village.

Prehistoric activity has recently been recorded in the parish in the form of a number of flint tools and waste flakes dating from the Neolithic. One Iron Age Trinovantian coin has been recovered and a hitherto unknown Roman Farmstead is being recorded. Great Eversden was settled before Little Eversden and is the larger of the two.

The name "Eversden" means "vale of a man named Eofory". The village is the birthplace of John Tiptoft, 1st Earl of Worcester, sometimes known as 'The Butcher of England'.

== St Mary's Church ==
There has been a church at Great Eversden since at least 1092, and dedicated to St Mary since at least the 13th century, but the original church was replaced in the 13th century. The 13th century church was razed to the ground in the mid 15th century when it was struck by lightning.

The current church was completed in 1470, consisting of a chancel, nave with north porch, and west tower, and includes two misericords built at this time. One of the misericords shows the family crest of the Beauchamp family (a fess between six cross crosslets) which may indicate that the family paid for much of the church, or that the misericords were installed for canons to pray for the dead of that family.

== Village life ==
The village contains a Village Hall, allotments, an open space known as the Fossey Field, an Indian restaurant, Cam Spice (which replaced The Hoops in February 2016), which for a short while was a Chinese restaurant. Prior to this the Hoops was the local pub which was open by 1851. The other former public house, The Fox, opened at the start of the 19th century at the north end of the village.

The Post Office closed in 2005 and the nearest shops are now in Orwell, Comberton, Toft and Haslingfield. The churches in Great and Little Eversden hold services on alternate Sundays.
