= Haslingfield =

Village in Cambridgeshire, England

Coordinates: 52.15°N 0.0533°E

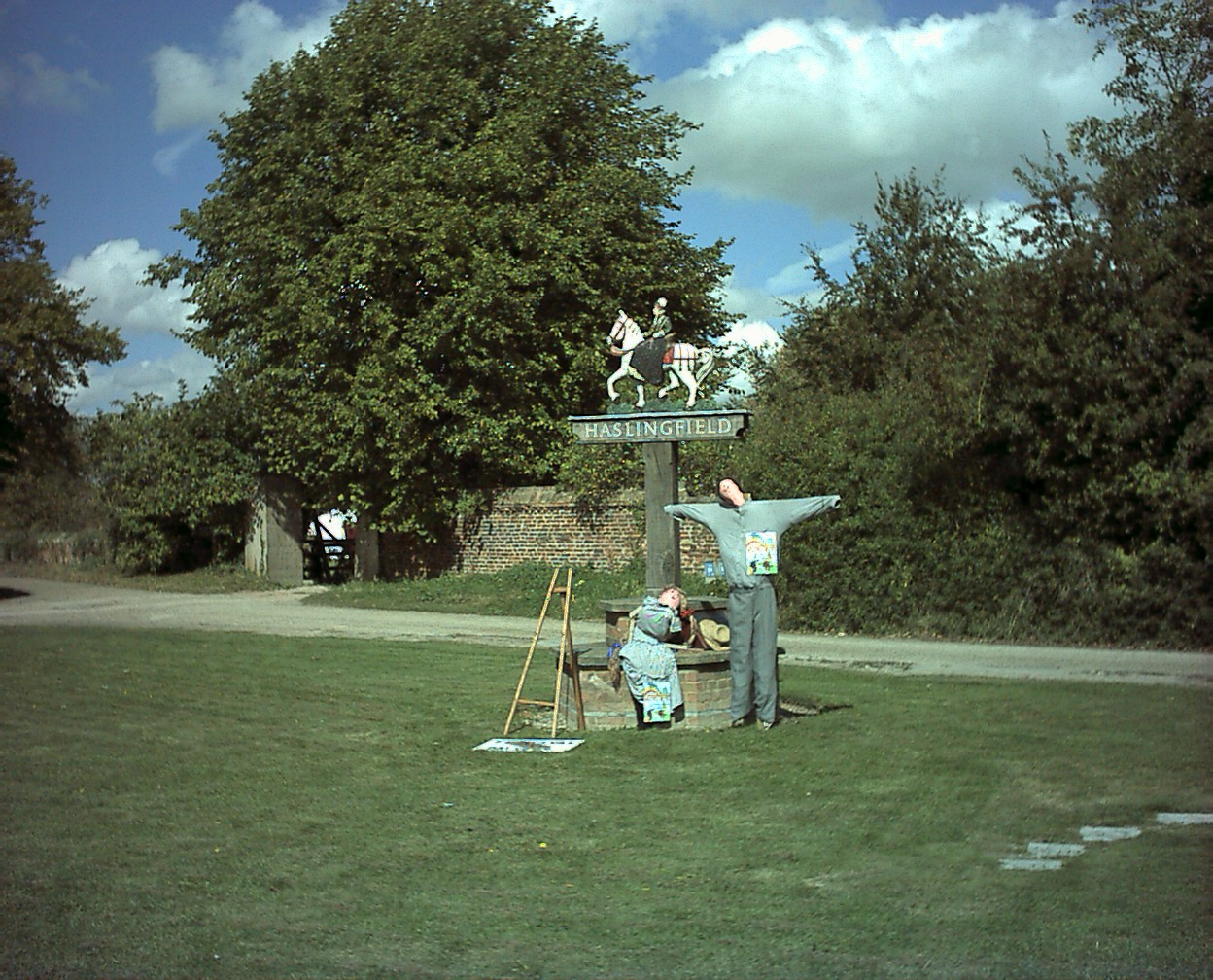
- Scarecrows from the festival

- Location within Cambridgeshire
- Population: 1,507 (2011)
- OS grid reference: TL4052
- Shire county: Cambridgeshire
- Region: East
- Country: England
- Sovereign state: United Kingdom
- Post town: Cambridge
- Postcode district: CB23
- Dialling code: 01223
- Police: Cambridgeshire
- Fire: Cambridgeshire
- Ambulance: East of England
- Website: HaslingfieldVillage.co.uk

Haslingfield (haiz-ling-field) is a village and civil parish in South Cambridgeshire, England. The village is about six miles south-west of Cambridge, between Harston, Barton and Barrington. The population in the 2001 census was 1,550 people living in 621 households, reducing at the 2011 Census to a population of 1,507 living in 626 households. The main streets in the village are called High Street and New Road and together they form an approximate circle around the Manor House. The village contains Haslingfield Primary School and All Saints Church.

== History ==
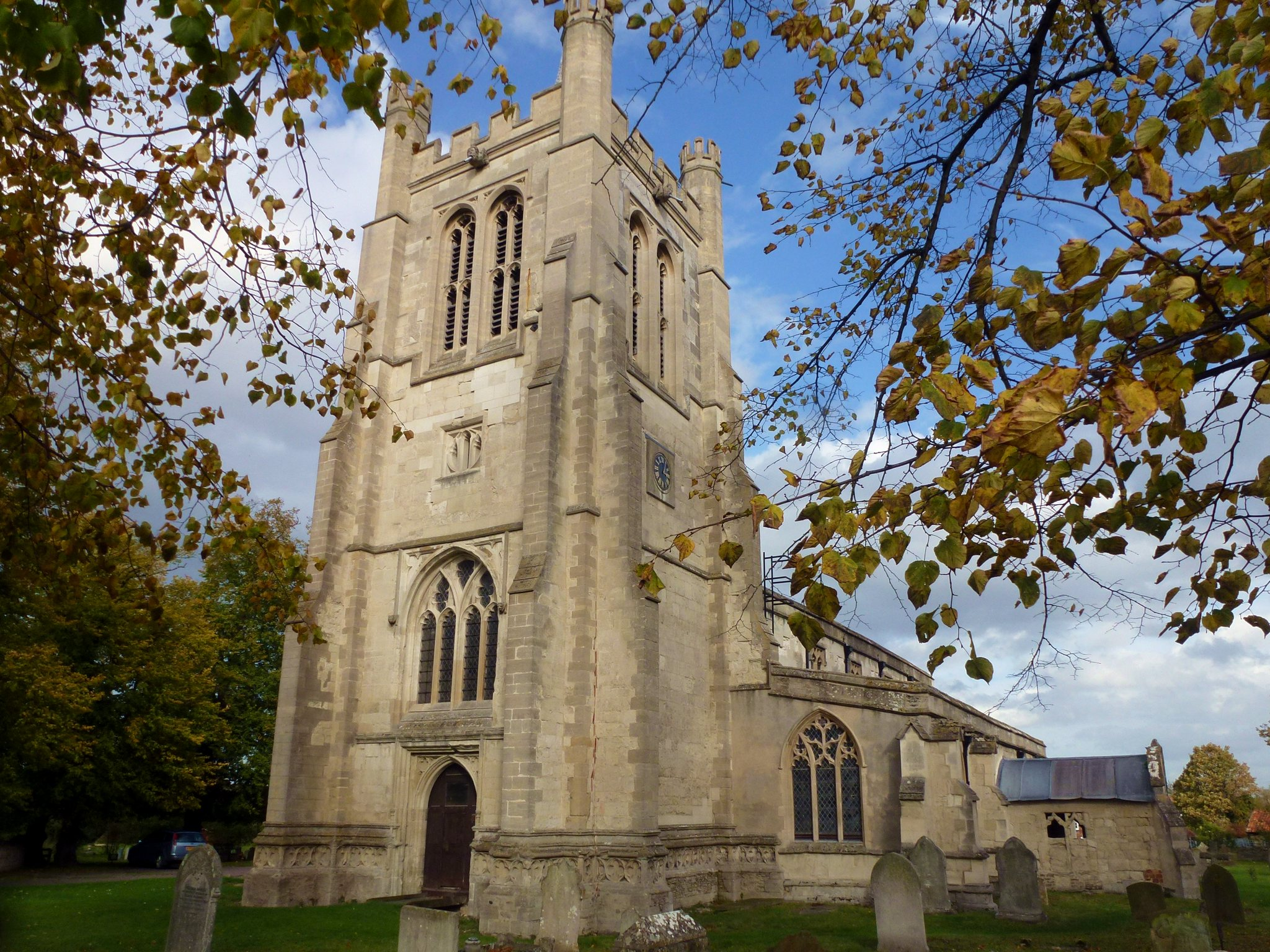
All Saints' Church

Haslingefeld appears in the Domesday Book with a population of 400, but there is archaeological evidence of people living in the vicinity 3,000 years ago. An Anglo-Saxon cemetery was discovered in the 1870s on Cantelupe Road, but unfortunately not carefully excavated.

The name Haslingfield is thought to be derived as follows: -field is an Anglo-Saxon suffix meaning cleared land in site of woods, while Hasling probably derives from the Haeslingas, a local band of people that lived here.

In a hypothesis, the valley of the Bourn Brook, Cambridgeshire is put forward as the location of the Battle of Brunanburh fought in 937. The battle, the location of which is unknown and has been speculated to have taken place in over 40 locations from South West England to Scotland, is suggested to have taken place close to the brook, on the open fields of Haslingfield, Harlton and Little Eversden.

The Church of All Saints was consecrated in 1352, and while much of the building dates from the 14th Century, the chancel walls date from the 12th century. On White Hill behind the village there used to be a small chapel but all trace has since disappeared. The Tudor manor house was built by Sir Thomas Wendy, lord of the manor at the time, and used to be Haslingfield Hall, a large mansion. Only one wing of the house remains, as the Manor, renovated and extended.

The village sign shows Queen Elizabeth I who stayed one night at the Manor in the year 1564. During her stay she is supposed to have lost a ring and a number of ring hunts have been held in recent times.

The economy of the community has been based on farming for most of its existence. There was a short period of mining for coprolite, used to make fertilizer in the late 19th century. The Earl De La Warr sold his estates in Haslingfield to John Chivers who planted fruit for his jam-making factory in Histon.

== Notable people ==
- Richard Swann-Mason (1871–1942), cricketer and Anglican clergyman
