= Kingston, Cambridgeshire =

Village in Cambridgeshire, England

Coordinates: 52.18°N 0.03°W

Kingston
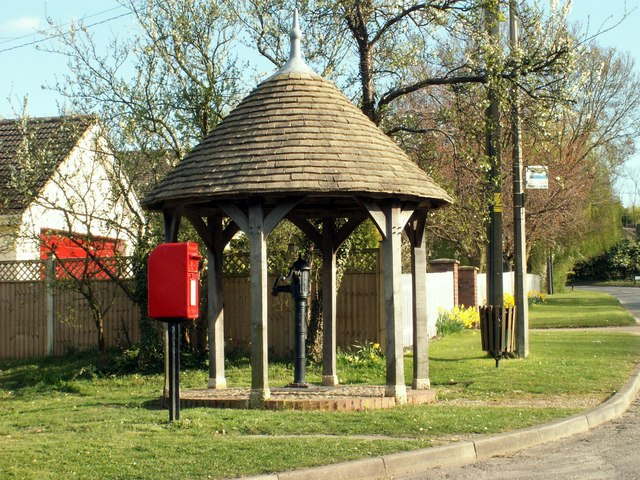

- Location within Cambridgeshire
- Population: 214; 238 (2011 Census)
- OS grid reference: TL344557
- Shire county: Cambridgeshire
- Region: East
- Country: England
- Sovereign state: United Kingdom
- Post town: Cambridge
- Postcode district: CB23
- Dialling code: 01223

Kingston is a small village and parish in the East of England region and the county Cambridgeshire, England. Situated 7 miles to the west of Cambridge, the population at the time of the 2001 census was 214, increasing to 238 at the 2011 Census.

The ancient parish is 1,907 acres (772 ha) in size, at an altitude of between 80 and 250 feet. The land is largely agricultural, with Kingston Wood covering around 100 acres.

== History ==
The discovery of Bronze Age and Iron Age flint tools and pottery in the parish indicate that Kingston's location on a gravel spur above two streams has been occupied for millennia. Additional finds in the Old Rectory garden suggest there may also have been a Roman villa site here.

The name Kingston, meaning "the king's manor", implies that the village was, prior to the Norman Conquest, a royal vill. It remained in the possession of the crown at the time of the Domesday Book in 1086.

The village thrived in medieval times, and was the third most-populous parish in Longstow hundred in 1327. In 1306 the lord of the manor, Constantine Mortimer, was granted the right to hold a weekly market on Tuesdays, as well as two annual fairs around the festivals of St Margaret and St Luke (19–21 July and 17–19 October). The market and fairs lapsed at some point over the next few centuries and the population fell sharply to leave Kingston as one of the smallest parishes by population. There are a number of late medieval houses remaining, and many others date from the 17th and 18th centuries. There are 21 listed buildings and structures in the village.

Electricity and mains water did not arrive in Kingston until after the Second World War, with water previously obtained from the village well or farm pumps.

== Church ==
There was probably a church in the village in the 11th century, but the present building dates from the 13th century. Dedicated to All Saints and Saint Andrew the building has a clerestoried nave with a low west tower containing three bells. The church has been in the patronage of King's College, Cambridge since 1457.

In the late 13th century Kingston Wood had its own chapel and chaplain.

A Congregational chapel was built in around 1839, now a United Reformed church.

== Village life ==
An inn is listed in Kingston in 1593. The Chequers and the Rose and Crown public houses opened towards the end of the 19th century, but the final pub in the village closed in 1960.

Though an earlier school held in Crossways house began in 1702, Kingston had a small school from 1876 until its closure in 1960. It is now the Village Hall. Children now attend primary school in the neighbouring village of Bourn.
