= Little Eversden =

Village in Cambridgeshire, England

Coordinates: 52.167°N 0.0°E

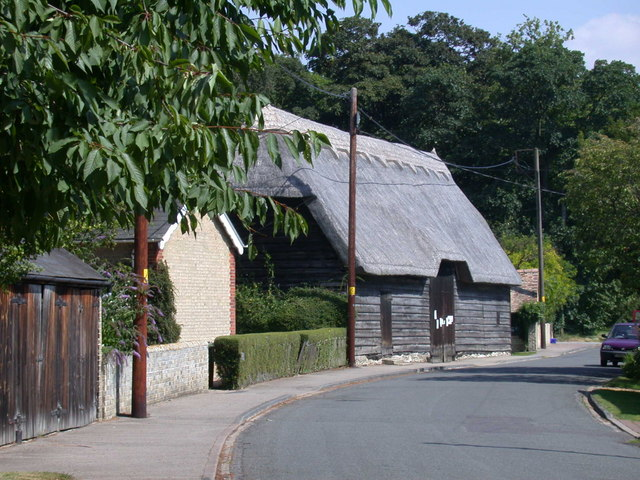
- Thatched barn in High Street

- Location within Cambridgeshire
- Population: 559; 600 (2011)
- OS grid reference: TL368540
- Shire county: Cambridgeshire
- Region: East
- Country: England
- Sovereign state: United Kingdom
- Post town: CAMBRIDGE
- Postcode district: CB23
- Dialling code: 01223

Little Eversden is a village approximately 7 miles (11 km) south-west of Cambridge, England. It has two main roads: Harlton Road which goes through Little Eversden and joins the A603, and High Street.

The Prime Meridian runs through the parish just to the west of the village, separating it from Great Eversden.

== History ==
The history of Little Eversden is closely related to that of its neighbour Great Eversden, though the two have formed distinct ecclesiastical parishes since at least the 13th century but one unified administrative parish from 1249 for 700 years. The parish of Little Eversden, covering 790 acres, lies between the Bourn Brook to the north and Mare Way, the ancient ridgeway, to the south. The south-east border is largely formed by the Roman road from Cambridge to Arrington Bridge.

In a hypothesis, the valley of the Bourn Brook, Cambridgeshire is put forward as the location of the Battle of Brunanburh fought in 937. The battle, the location of which is unknown and has been speculated to have taken place in over 40 locations from South West England to Scotland, is suggested to have taken place close to the brook, on the open fields of Haslingfield, Harlton and Little Eversden.

Little Eversden had its own small village school until July 1968 when it was closed and the building is now the office of a company.

== Church ==
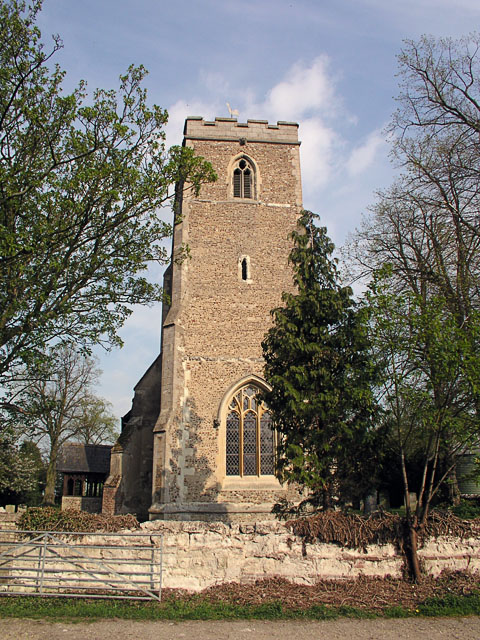
St Helen's Church

Little Eversden obtained a church at a later date than Great Eversden and the two presumably shared a church for a period until the first church was built in the 13th century. No part of the original church survives.

Little Eversden's present parish church has been dedicated to St Helen since at least the 14th century. The present building consists of a chancel, nave with north porch, and west tower, with the earliest parts dating from the 14th century when the nave and chancel were rebuilt. The restored font dates from the 13th century. The bells were restored in 2007 and two added making a ring of six.

== Village life ==
The village has a GP Surgery, a sports field and a pavilion.

Little Eversden had a public house, The Plough, from the start of the 19th century though it closed in the middle 20th century.

== Notable residents ==
- Enid Barraud (1904–1972), author and poet, lived in Little Eversden after arriving as a land girl in WWII. Her first two books recount her experiences there.
