= List of places in Cambridgeshire =

This is a list of cities, towns and villages in the county of Cambridgeshire, England. It includes places in the former county of Huntingdonshire, now a district of Cambridgeshire.

== A ==
Abbotsley, Abbots Ripton, Abington Pigotts, Alconbury, Alconbury Weston, Aldreth, Alwalton, America, Arrington, Ashley

== B ==
Babraham, Balsham, Barham, Bar Hill, Barnwell, Barrington, Bartlow, Barton, Barway, Bassingbourn, Benwick, Blackhorse Drove, Bluntisham, Bottisham, Bourn, Boxworth, Brampton, Brington, Broughton, Brinkley, Buckden, Buckworth, Burrough Green, Burwell, Bury, Bythorn

== C ==
Caldecote (Huntingdonshire), Caldecote (South Cambridgeshire), Cambourne, Cambridge, Camps End, Cardinal's Green, Carlton, Castle Camps, Catworth, Caxton, Chatteris, Cherry Hinton, Chesterton, Cambridge, Chesterton, Huntingdonshire, Chettisham, Cheveley, Childerley, Chippenham, Chittering, Christchurch, Coates, Coldham, Collett's Bridge, Colne, Comberton, Commercial End, Conington, Coppingford, Coton, Cottenham, Coveney, Covington, Croxton, Croydon

== D ==
Denton, Deeping Gate, Diddington, Ditton Green, Doddington, Dogsthorpe, Downham, Dry Drayton, Dullingham, Duxford

== E ==
Earith, East Hatley, Easton, Eastrea, Eaton Ford, Eaton Socon, Ellington, Elm, Elsworth, Eltisley, Elton, Ely, Euximoor, Eye, Eye Green, Eynesbury, Eynesbury Hardwicke

== F ==
Folksworth, Fowlmere, Foxton

== G ==
Gamlingay, Girton, Glatton, Godmanchester, Gorefield, Grafham, Grantchester, Graveley, Great Abington, Great Chishill, Great Eversden, Great Gransden, Great Gidding, Great Paxton, Great Shelford, Great Staughton, Great Wilbraham, Guilden Morden, Guyhirn

== H ==
Haddenham, Haddon, Hail Weston, Hamerton, Hardwick, Harlton, Harston, Haslingfield, Hatley, Hatley St George, Hauxton, Hemingford Abbots, Hemingford Grey, Heydon, Highfields, Hildersham, Hilton, Hinxton, Histon, Holme, Holywell, Horningsea, Horseheath, Houghton, Huntingdon

== I ==
Ickleton, Impington, Isleham

== J ==
Jesus Lane

== K ==
Kennett, Keyston, Kimbolton, Kings Ripton, Kingston, Kirtling, Knapwell, Kneesworth

== L ==
Landbeach, Leighton Bromswold, Leverington, Linton, Litlington, Little Abington, Little Chishill, Little Ditton, Little Downham, Little Eversden, Little Gidding, Little Gransden, Little Ouse, Little Paxton, Littleport, Little Shelford, Little Thetford, Little Wilbraham, Lode, Lolworth, Long Meadow, Longstanton, Longstowe

== M ==
Madingley, Manea, March, Melbourn, Meldreth, Mepal, Midloe, Milton, Molesworth, Morborne, Murrow

== N ==
Needingworth, Newton-in-the-Isle, Newton, South Cambridgeshire, Northstowe

== O ==
Oakington, Offord Cluny, Offord D'Arcy, Oldhurst, Old Weston, Orwell, Over

== P ==
Pampisford, Papworth Everard, Papworth St Agnes, Parson Drove, Perry, Peterborough, Pidley, Pondersbridge, Prickwillow, Pymoor

== Q ==
Queen Adelaide

== R ==
Rampton, Ramsey, Ramsey Forty Foot, Ramsey Heights, Ramsey Mereside, Ramsey St Mary's, Reach, Ring's End

== S ==
Sawston, Sawtry, Saxon Street, Shepreth, Shingay, Shudy Camps, Sibson, Snailwell, Soham, Somersham, Southoe, Spaldwick, Stapleford, Steeple Gidding, Steeple Morden, Stetchworth, Stibbington, Stilton, St Ives, St Neots, Stonea, Stonely, Stow-cum-Quy, Stow Longa, Streetley End, Stretham, Stuntney, Sutton, Sutton Gault, Sutton-in-the-Isle, Swaffham Bulbeck, Swaffham Prior, Swavesey, Swingbrow

== T ==
Tadlow, Tetworth, Teversham, The Raveleys, The Stukeleys, Tholomas Drove, Thorney, Thorney Toll, Thriplow, Tilbrook, Tips End, Toft, Toseland, Trumpington, Turves, Tydd St Giles

== U ==
Upend, Upton (Huntingdonshire), Upton (Peterborough), Upware, Upwood

== W ==
Warboys, Wardy Hill, Waresley, Washingley, Waterbeach, Water Newton, Welches Dam, Wendy, Wentworth, Westley Waterless, Weston Colville, Weston Green, Westry, Westwick, West Wickham, West Wratting, Whaddon, Whittlesey, Whittlesford, Whittlesford Bridge, Wicken, Wilburton, Willingham, Wimblington, Wimpole, Winwick, Wintringham, Wisbech, Wisbech St Mary, Wistow, Witcham, Witchford, Wood Ditton, Woodditton, Woodhurst, Woodwalton, Woolley, Wothorpe, Wyton

== Y ==
Yaxley, Yelling

== See also ==
- List of Cambridgeshire settlements by population
- List of civil parishes in Cambridgeshire
- List of places in England
