= List of churches in Huntingdonshire =

The following is a list of churches in the district of Huntingdonshire.

== Active churches ==
The district has an estimated 131 churches for 175,700 inhabitants, a ratio of one church to every 1,341 people.

There are no churches in the civil parishes of Alconbury Weston, Conington, Denton and Caldecote, Earith, Wood Walton and Wyton on the Hill.

Name	Civil parish	Dedication	Web	Founded	Denomination	Benefice	Notes
Every Nation Church Huntingdon	Huntingdon		www.everynationhuntingdon.co.uk	2020	Every Nation		Meets at St Benedict's House, St Benedict's Court, PE29 3PN (at the fountains on Huntingdon High Street)
St Bartholomew, Great Gransden	Great Gransden	Bartholomew		Medieval	Church of England	Gransdens, Abbotsley & Waresley	Benefice also includes Little Gransden church in S Cambs
St James, Waresley	Waresley-cum-Tetworth	James		Medieval	Church of England	Gransdens, Abbotsley & Waresley	
St Margaret, Abbotsley	Abbotsley	Margaret the Virgin		Medieval	Church of England	Gransdens, Abbotsley & Waresley	Churches Conservation Trust but chancel still used as church
St Mary, St Neots	St Neots	Mary		Medieval	Church of England		
St Joseph, St Neots	St Neots	Joseph			Roman Catholic	St Neots & Buckden Parish	
New Street Baptist Church, St Neots	St Neots			1800	Independent		
St Neots United Reformed Church	St Neots			1718	URC		Current building 1888
St Neots Evangelical Church	St Neots				FIEC		
Open Door Church	St Neots				Newfrontiers		Meets in the Priory Centre
St Mary, Eynesbury	St Neots (Eynesbury)	Mary		Medieval	Church of England	Eynesbury	
Berkley Street Methodist Church	St Neots (Eynesbury)			1794	Methodist	St Neots & Huntingdon Circuit	
Eaton Ford Methodist Church	St Neots (Eaton Ford)				Methodist	St Neots & Huntingdon Circuit	
River Church	St Neots (Eaton Ford)				Harvest Network		Meets in The Eatons Centre
St Mary, Eaton Socon	St Neots (Eaton Socon)	Mary		Medieval	Church of England	Eaton Socon	
Holy Cross, Yelling	Yelling	Cross		Medieval	Church of England	Papworth Team	
St Michael, Toseland	Toseland	Michael		Medieval	Church of England	Papworth Team	Papworth Team also includes 12 churches in S Cambs
St James, Little Paxton	Little Paxton	James		Medieval	Church of England	Paxtons Benefice	Chapel of Great Paxton until 1978
Kingfisher Church	Little Paxton			2013	FIEC		Plant from St Neots Evangelical Church. Meets in primary school
Holy Trinity, Great Paxton	Great Paxton	Trinity		Medieval	Church of England	Paxtons Benefice	Minster
St Leonard, Southoe	Southoe & Midloe	Leonard of Noblac		Medieval	Church of England	Paxtons Benefice	
St Laurence, Diddington	Diddington	Laurence of Rome		Medieval	Church of England	Paxtons Benefice	
St Nicholas, Hail Weston	Hail Weston	Nicholas		Medieval	Church of England	Staughtons & Hail Weston	Benefice also includes one church in Bedford
St Andrew, Great Staughton	Great Staughton	Andrew		Medieval	Church of England	Staughtons & Hail Weston	
Perry Baptist Church	Perry			1841	Baptist Union		Old church demolished 1984, new building 1990
St Andrew, Kimbolton	Kimbolton	Andrew		Medieval	Church of England	South Leightonstone Group	
All Saints, Tilbrook	Tilbrook	All Saints		Medieval	Church of England	South Leightonstone Group	
All Saints, Covington	Covington	All Saints		Medieval	Church of England	South Leightonstone Group	
St Botolph, Stow Longa	Stow Longa	Botwulf of Thorney		Medieval	Church of England	South Leightonstone Group	
St James, Spaldwick	Spaldwick	James		Medieval	Church of England	South Leightonstone Group	
St Peter, Easton	Easton	Peter		Medieval	Church of England	South Leightonstone Group	
St Giles, Barham	Barham & Woolley	Giles		Medieval	Church of England	South Leightonstone Group	
St Mary, Buckden	Buckden	Mary		Medieval	Church of England	Buckden & Offord Cluny	
St Hugh of Lincoln, Buckden	Buckden	Hugh of Lincoln			Roman Catholic	St Neots & Buckden Parish	
Buckden Methodist Church	Buckden				Methodist	St Neots & Huntingdon Circuit	
All Saints, Offord Cluny	Offords Cluny & D'Arcy	All Saints		Medieval	Church of England	Buckden & Offord Cluny	
All Saints, Grafham	Grafham	All Saints		Medieval	Church of England	East Leightonstone	
All Saints, Ellington	Ellington	All Saints		Medieval	Church of England	East Leightonstone	
St Mary Magdalene, Brampton	Brampton	Mary Magdalene		Medieval	Church of England	East Leightonstone	
Brampton Methodist Church	Brampton				Methodist	St Neots & Huntingdon Circuit	
All Saints, Huntingdon	Huntingdon	All Saints		Medieval	Church of England	Huntingdon Benefice	
St Mary, Huntingdon	Huntingdon	Mary		Medieval	Church of England	Huntingdon Benefice	
St Barnabas, Huntingdon	Huntingdon	Barnabas			Church of England	St Barnabas & the Riptons	
St Michael the Archangel, Huntingdon	Huntingdon	Michael			Roman Catholic		
Trinity Free Church Huntingdon	Huntingdon	Trinity			Baptist Union		
Huntingdon Methodist Church	Huntingdon				Methodist	St Neots & Huntingdon Circuit	
Huntingdon Church of Christ	Huntingdon				Churches of Christ		
Huntingdonshire Community Church	Huntingdon				Plumbline		
Daybreak Community Church	Huntingdon				?		
Medway Christian Fellowship	Huntingdon				?		
International Prayer Palace Church	Huntingdon			2000	?		
All Saints, Hartford	Huntingdon (Hartford)	All Saints		Medieval	Church of England	Hartford & Houghton	
St Bartholomew, Great Stukeley	The Stukeleys	Bartholomew		Medieval	Church of England	Huntingdon Benefice	
St Martin, Little Stukeley	The Stukeleys	Martin of Tours		Medieval	Church of England	Huntingdon Benefice	
Grace Fellowship Baptist Church, Little Stukeley	The Stukeleys				Baptist Union		
Alconbury Independent Baptist Church	The Stukeleys			1979-1980	Independent		Current building 1988-1989
RAF Alconbury Chapel	The Stukeleys				Interdenominational		
St Andrew, Abbots Ripton	Abbots Ripton	Andrew		Medieval	Church of England	St Barnabas & the Riptons	
St Peter, Kings Ripton	Kings Ripton	Peter		Medieval	Church of England	St Barnabas & the Riptons	
St Mary the Virgin, Godmanchester	Godmanchester	Mary		Medieval	Church of England	Godmanchester & Hilton	
Godmanchester Baptist Church	Godmanchester				Baptist Union		
Huntingdon Quaker Meeting	Godmanchester				Quakers		
St Mary Magdalene, Hilton	Hilton	Mary Magdalene		Medieval	Church of England	Godmanchester & Hilton	
Hilton Methodist Church	Hilton				Methodist	St Neots & Huntingdon Circuit	
St Mary the Virgin, Houghton	Houghton & Wyton	Mary		Medieval	Church of England	Hartford & Houghton	
St Margaret of Antioch, Hemingford Abbots	Hemingford Abbots	Margaret the Virgin		Medieval	Church of England		
St James, Hemingford Grey	Hemingford Grey	James		Medieval	Church of England		
All Saints, St Ives	St Ives	All Saints		Medieval	Church of England		
Sacred Heart, St Ives	St Ives	Sacred Heart		1899	Roman Catholic		Current building transplanted from Cambridge, 1902
St Ives Methodist Church	St Ives			1784	Methodist	St Neots & Huntingdon Circuit	First chapel 1815, rebuilt 1905
St Ives Free Church (United Reformed)	St Ives			C17th	URC	St Ives URC Group	Current building 1864
St Ives Evangelical Christian Church	St Ives				FIEC		
Crossways Christian Centre	St Ives				Assemblies of God		
St Ives Christian Fellowship	St Ives				?		
The Bridge Church	St Ives			2001	?		
SS Peter & Paul, Fenstanton	Fenstanton	Peter & Paul		Medieval	Church of England		
Fenstanton United Reformed Church	Fenstanton			pre-1874	URC	St Ives URC Group	Current building 1874
St John the Baptist, Holywell	Holywell-cum-Needingworth	John the Baptist		Medieval	Church of England	Meridian Benefice	
Needingworth Baptist Church	Holywell-cum-Needingworth			1767	Independent		
St Mary, Bluntisham cum Earith	Bluntisham	Mary		Medieval	Church of England	Meridian Benefice	
Bluntisham Baptist Church	Bluntisham			1784	Baptist Union		
St Helen, Colne	Colne	Helena (empress)		Medieval	Church of England	Meridian Benefice	Rebuilt 1900
St Leonard, Catworth	Catworth	Leonard of Noblac		Medieval	Church of England	West Leightonstone	
St John the Baptist, Keyston	Bythorn & Keyston	John the Baptist		Medieval	Church of England	West Leightonstone	
St Lawrence, Bythorn	Bythorn & Keyston	Laurence of Rome		Medieval	Church of England	West Leightonstone	
St Peter, Molesworth	Brington & Molesworth	Peter		Medieval	Church of England	West Leightonstone	
All Saints, Brington	Brington & Molesworth	All Saints		Medieval	Church of England	West Leightonstone	
St Swithin, Old Weston	Old Weston	Swithun		Medieval	Church of England	West Leightonstone	
St Mary, Leighton Bromswold	Leighton	Mary		Medieval	Church of England	West Leightonstone	
All Saints, Buckworth	Buckworth	All Saints		Medieval	Church of England	North Leightonstone	
SS Peter & Paul, Alconbury	Alconbury	Peter & Paul		Medieval	CoE / Methodist	North L'stone / St Neots & Hunt Circuit	
St Margaret, Upton	Upton & Coppingford	Margaret the Virgin		Medieval	Church of England	North Leightonstone	
All Saints, Hamerton	Hamerton & Steeple Gidding	All Saints		Medieval	Church of England	North Leightonstone	
St John, Little Gidding	Little Gidding	John the Evangelist		Medieval	Church of England	North Leightonstone	Rebuilt 1714
All Saints, Winwick	Winwick	All Saints		Medieval	Church of England	North Leightonstone	
St Michael, Great Gidding	Great Gidding	Michael		Medieval	Church of England	North Leightonstone	
St John the Baptist, Somersham	Somersham	John the Baptist		Medieval	Church of England	Somersham Parishes	
Somersham Baptist Church	Somersham			1786	Baptist Union		Building 1812
All Saints, Pidley-cum-Fenton	Pidley-cum-Fenton	All Saints		Medieval	Church of England	Somersham Parishes	Building 1864-1865
St John the Baptist, Woodhurst	Woodhurst	John the Baptist		Medieval	Church of England	Somersham Parishes	
St Peter, Oldhurst	Old Hurst	Peter		Medieval	Church of England	Somersham Parishes	
All Saints, Broughton	Broughton	All Saints		Medieval	Church of England	Warboys, Broughton, Bury, Wistow	
St Mary Magdalene, Warboys	Warboys	Mary Magdalene		Medieval	CoE / Methodist	Warboys, Broughton, Bury, Wistow	
Warboys Grace Baptist Church	Warboys			C17th	Grace Baptist		Building 1829-1831
St John the Baptist, Wistow	Wistow	John the Baptist		Medieval	Church of England	Warboys, Broughton, Bury, Wistow	
Holy Cross, Bury	Bury	Cross		Medieval	Church of England	Warboys, Broughton, Bury, Wistow	
St Peter, Upwood	Upwood & The Raveleys	Peter		Medieval	Church of England	Ramseys and Upwood	
St Thomas a Becket, Ramsey	Ramsey	Thomas Becket		Medieval	Church of England	Ramseys and Upwood	
Sacred Heart of Jesus, Ramsey	Ramsey	Sacred Heart			Roman Catholic	Whittlesey & Ramsey Parish	
Great Whyte Baptist Church	Ramsey				?		
Salem Baptist Church	Ramsey			1857	?		
Ramsey Methodist Church	Ramsey				Methodist	St Neots & Huntingdon Circuit	
St Mary, Ramsey St Mary's	Ramsey (Ramsey St Mary's)	Mary		1858-1859	Church of England	Ramseys and Upwood	
St Thomas, Pondersbridge	Ramsey (Pondersbridge)	Thomas		???	Church of England	Whittlesey, Pondersbridge, Coates	Benefice also includes 3 churches in Fenland. Building 1869
All Saints, Sawtry	Sawtry	All Saints		Medieval	Church of England	Sawtry & Glatton	Rebuilt 1880
St Benedict's Community, Sawtry	Sawtry	Benedict of Nursia		1947	Roman Catholic	Orton & Sawtry Parish of St Luke	
Sawtry Methodist Church	Sawtry				Methodist	St Neots & Huntingdon Circuit	
St Nicholas, Glatton	Glatton	Nicholas		Medieval	Church of England	Sawtry & Glatton	
St Giles, Holme	Holme	Giles		Medieval	Church of England	Yaxley & Holme	Rebuilt 1862
St Peter, Yaxley	Yaxley	Peter		Medieval	Church of England	Yaxley & Holme	
Yaxley Methodist Church	Yaxley				Methodist	Peterborough Circuit	
Grace Communion Church Cambridgeshire	Farcet				Grace Communion International		Meets in Village Hall
St Mary, Farcet	Farcet	Mary		Medieval	Church of England	Stanground & Farcet	Benefice also includes 2 churches in Peterborough
St Mary Magdalene, Stilton	Stilton	Mary Magdalene		Medieval	Church of England	Stilton Group	
St Helen, Folksworth	Folksworth & Washingley	Helena (empress)		Medieval	Church of England	Stilton Group	
All Saints, Morborne	Morborne	All Saints		Medieval	Church of England	Stilton Group	
St Mary, Haddon	Haddon	Mary		Medieval	Church of England	Stilton Group	
All Saints, Elton	Elton	All Saints		Medieval	Church of England	Stilton Group	
Elton Methodist Church	Elton				Methodist	Peterborough Circuit	
St Michael, Chesterton	Chesterton	Michael		Medieval	Church of England	Chesterton & Alwalton	
St Andrew, Alwalton	Alwalton	Andrew		Medieval	Church of England	Chesterton & Alwalton	
St Remigius, Water Newton	Water Newton	Remigius		Medieval	Church of England	Castor Benefice	Benefice also includes 4 churches in Peterborough
St John the Baptist, Stibbington	Sibson-cum-Stibbington	John the Baptist		Medieval	Church of England	Castor Benefice	

== Defunct churches ==
Name	Civil parish	Dedication	Founded	Redundant	Denomination	Notes
St Andrew, Woodwalton	Wood Walton	Andrew	Medieval	pre-1979	Church of England	Friends of Friendless Churches 1979
All Saints, Conington	Conington	All Saints	Medieval		Church of England	Churches Conservation Trust
St Peter, Offord D'Arcy	Offords Cluny & D'Arcy	Peter	Medieval	1978	Church of England	Churches Conservation Trust
St Andrew, Steeple Gidding	Hamerton & Steeple Gidding	Andrew	Medieval		Church of England	Churches Conservation Trust
St Mary, Woolley	Barham & Woolley	Mary	Medieval	1960	Church of England	Ruinous
All Saints, Wyton	Houghton & Wyton	All Saints	Medieval	1980s	Church of England	
St James, Little Raveley	Upwood & The Raveleys	James	Medieval		Church of England	Chapel of ease to Wistow and then Bury
Washingley Parish Church	Folksworth & Washingley	???	Medieval	C15th	Church of England	Vanished
All Saints, Denton	Denton & Caldecote	All Saints	Medieval	1960s	Church of England	Ruinous
St Mary Magdalene, Caldecote	Denton & Caldecote	Mary Magdalene	Medieval	1970s	Church of England	Rebuilt 1874
Sibson Parish Church	Sibson-cum-Stibbington		Medieval	C13th	Church of England	One mention in Domesday Book only
All Saints, Coppingford	Upton & Coppingford	All Saints	Medieval	C17th	Church of England	
St Andrew, Sawtry	Sawtry	Andrew	Medieval	1879	Church of England	
Holy Trinity, Huntingdon	Huntingdon	Trinity	Medieval	C14th	Church of England	
St Andrew, Huntingdon	Huntingdon	Andrew	Medieval	C16th	Church of England	
St Benedict, Huntingdon	Huntingdon	Benedict of Nursia	Medieval	1668	Church of England	
St Botolph, Huntingdon	Huntingdon	Botwulf of Thorney	Medieval	?	Church of England	
St Clement, Huntingdon	Huntingdon	Pope Clement I	Medieval	C14th	Church of England	
St Edmund, Huntingdon	Huntingdon	Edmund the Martyr	Medieval	1312	Church of England	
St John, Huntingdon	Huntingdon	John the Baptist	Medieval	1667	Church of England	
St Lawrence, Huntingdon	Huntingdon	Lawrence	Medieval	C13th	Church of England	
St Martin, Huntingdon	Huntingdon	Martin of Tours	Medieval	1343	Church of England	
St Michael, Huntingdon	Huntingdon	Michael	Medieval	C16th	Church of England	
St Nicholas, Huntingdon	Huntingdon	Nicholas	Medieval	?	Church of England	
St Peter, Huntingdon	Huntingdon	Peter	Medieval	C16th	Church of England	
St George, Huntingdon	Huntingdon	George	?	C17th	Church of England	
St Germain, Huntingdon	Huntingdon	Germanus of Auxerre	?	C17th	Church of England	

== Map of medieval parish churches ==
=== Cambridgeshire ===
Medieval parish churches in Cambridgeshire

=== Central Cambridge ===
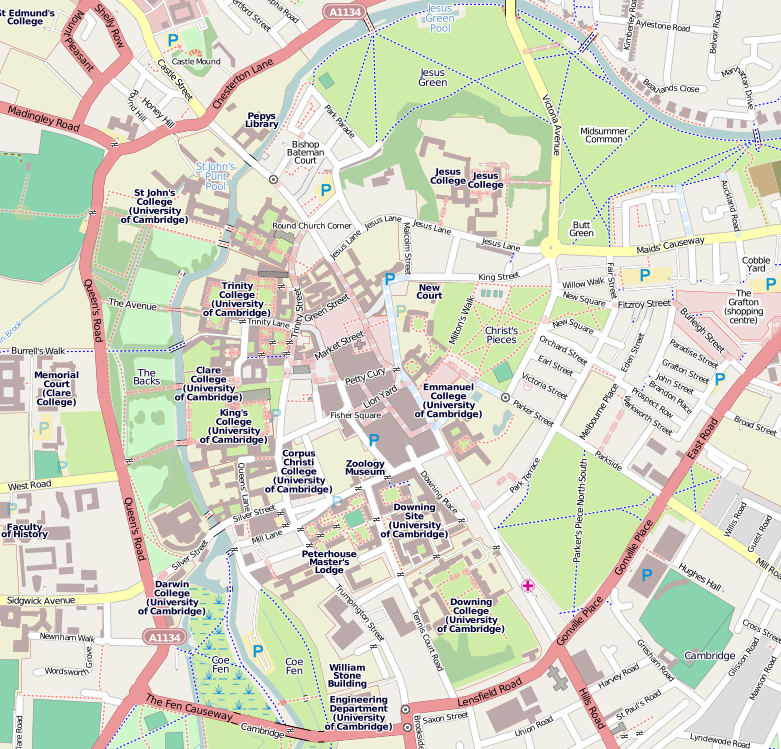
Medieval parish churches in Cambridge Central
