= Hurstingstone (hundred) =

Hundred of Huntingdonshire, England

Coordinates: 52.371°N 0.095°W

Hurstingstone was a hundred of Huntingdonshire, England that was mentioned in the Domesday Book of 1086.

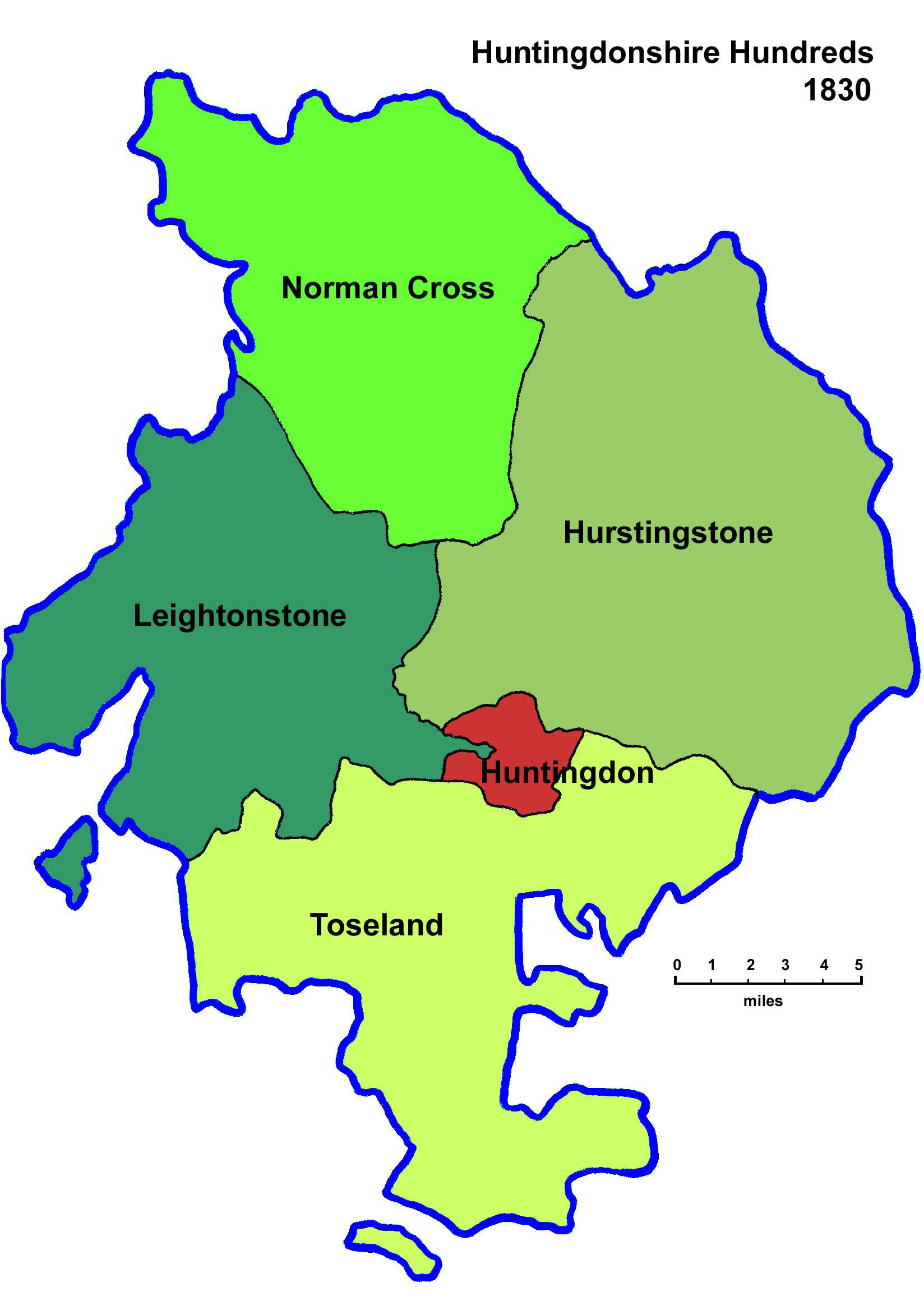
Hundreds of Huntingdonshire in 1830

According to Victoria County History, the derivation of the name of Hurstingstone is not clear; one possibility is that Hurstingstone comes from the name of the tribe of Hirstina (or Hyrstingas) who had settled in the area. There was a stone called the Hursting Stone on Hustingstone Hill which is the highest point on the road between St Ives and Old Hurst; it was here that the area's moot was held until it was moved to Broughton in the 14th century. There was a gallows on Hurstingstone Hill. The Hundred was given by Henry I to the abbot and convent of Ramsey c. 1155 in whose possession it remained until the dissolution of the monastery in 1539. By 1654 the hundred was sold to Edward Montagu and has been in the family of the Earls of Sandwich ever since.

The Hursting Stone resembles the shape of a chair and it is also known as the Abbot's Chair. It is possible that the Hursting Stone was used as a plinth for a stone cross around the 12th century when such crosses were commonly erected at boundaries. The stone has been moved and is now at the Norris Museum in St Ives.

In 1870–72, Hurstingstone was described like this:

HURSTINGSTONE, a hundred in Huntingdon; named from an ancient stone near Old Hurst; and containing Old Hurst parish, twenty-two other parishes, and part of another. Acres, 72, 670. Pop. in 1851, 20, 946; in 1861, 19, 961. Houses, 4, 323.

— John Marius Wilson, Imperial Gazetteer of England and Wales

Hurstingstone was one of four Hundreds of Huntingdonshire and covered the eastern region of the county. The other Hundreds were Norman Cross, Leightonstone and Toseland.

In the Domesday Book of 1086 there were eighteen places listed in the Hundred of Hurstingstone. They were: Abbotts Ripton, Bluntisham, Botuluesbrige, Broughton, Colne, Great Stukeley, Hartford, Holywell, Houghton, Huntingdon, Little Stukeley, Ramsey, St Ives, Somersham, Upwood, Warboys, Wistow and Wyton.

The area covered by the hundred of Hurstingstone was little changed through to 1932 although a number of new parishes had been formed and Huntingdon was by then a separate administrative area. The parishes in Hurstingstone in 1932 were: Abbotts Ripton, Bluntisham, Broughton, Bury, Colne, Earith, Great Raveley, Great Stukeley, Hartford, Holywell with Needingworth, Houghton, Kings Ripton, Little Raveley, Little Stukeley, Old Hurst, Pidley, Ramsey, St Ives, Sapley, Somersham, Upwood, Warboys, Wistow, Woodhurst and Wyton.
