= PE postcode area =

Postcode area within the United Kingdom

Peterborough
- Postcode area
- Location within the United Kingdom
- Coordinates: 52.670°N 0.012°W
- Sovereign state: United Kingdom
- Postcode area: PE
- Postcode area name: Peterborough
- Post towns: 18
- Postcode districts: 39
- Postcode sectors: 162
- Postcodes (live): 26,561
- Postcodes (total): 38,938
- Statistics as at May 2020

The PE postcode area, also known as the Peterborough postcode area, is a group of 36 postcode districts in eastern England, within 18 post towns. These cover north and west Cambridgeshire (including Peterborough, Huntingdon, Chatteris, St. Neots, St. Ives, March and Wisbech), much of south and east Lincolnshire (including Bourne, Stamford, Spalding, Boston, Skegness and Spilsby), and west Norfolk (including King's Lynn, Hunstanton, Sandringham, Swaffham and Downham Market), plus the north-easternmost part of Northamptonshire, the easternmost part of Rutland and very small parts of Bedfordshire.

== Coverage ==
The approximate coverage of the postcode districts:

Postcode district	Post town	Coverage	Local authority area(s)
PE1	PETERBOROUGH	Peterborough, Dogsthorpe, Eastfield, Eastgate, Fengate, Newark, Parnwell	Peterborough
PE2	PETERBOROUGH	Alwalton, Fletton, The Ortons, Stanground, Woodston	Peterborough
PE3	PETERBOROUGH	Peterborough, Bretton, Longthorpe, Netherton, Ravensthorpe, Westwood	Peterborough
PE4	PETERBOROUGH	Gunthorpe, Paston, Walton, Werrington	Peterborough
PE5	PETERBOROUGH	Ailsworth, Castor, Sutton	Peterborough
PE6	PETERBOROUGH	Baston, Crowland, The Deepings, Eye, Glinton, Langtoft, Northborough, Upton	Peterborough, South Kesteven, South Holland
PE7	PETERBOROUGH	Alwalton, Chesterton, Coates, Farcet, Folksworth, Hampton, Holme, Stilton, Whittlesey, Yaxley	Huntingdonshire, Fenland, Peterborough
PE8	PETERBOROUGH	Achurch, Apethorpe, Armston, Ashton, Barnwell, Blatherwycke, Cotterstock, Elton, Fotheringhay, Hemington, Kings Cliffe, Lower Benefield, Luddington, Nassington, Oundle, Polebrook, Sibson, Southwick, Stibbington, Tansor, Thornhaugh, Thurning, Upper Benefield, Wadenhoe, Wansford, Warmington, Water Newton, Wigsthorpe, Wittering, Woodnewton, Yarwell	North Northamptonshire, Huntingdonshire, Peterborough
PE9	STAMFORD	Stamford, Ashton, Aunby, Bainton, Barholm, Barnack, Braceborough, Careby, Carlby, Collyweston, Duddington, Essendine, Easton on the Hill, Great Casterton, Greatford, Ketton, Little Casterton, Newstead, Pickworth, Pilsgate, Ryhall, Southorpe, Tallington, Tickencote, Tinwell, Tixover, Uffington, Ufford, Wilsthorpe, Wothorpe	South Kesteven, Rutland, North Northamptonshire, Peterborough
PE10	BOURNE	Bourne, Bulby, Cawthorpe, Dowsby, Dunsby, Dyke, Edenham, Grimsthorpe, Haconby, Hanthorpe, Keisby, Kirkby Underwood, Lound, Manthorpe, Morton, Rippingale, Scottlethorpe, Stainfield, Thurlby, Toft, Twenty, Witham on the Hill	South Kesteven
PE11	SPALDING	Spalding (most of), Deeping St. Nicholas, Donington, Gosberton, Hop Pole, Pinchbeck, Pode Hole, Quadring, Quadring Fen, Surfleet, Tongue End	South Holland, South Kesteven
PE12	SPALDING	Spalding (eastern outskirts), Cowbit, Gedney, Fleet, Holbeach, Holbeach Drove, Little Sutton, Long Sutton, Moulton, Sutton Bridge, Weston, Weston Hills, Whaplode	South Holland, Fenland
PE13	WISBECH	Wisbech (most of), Guyhirn, Murrow, Parson Drove, Tydd St Giles, Tydd St Mary, Wisbech St Mary	Fenland, King's Lynn and West Norfolk, South Holland
PE14	WISBECH	Wisbech (outskirts), Elm, Emneth, Emneth Hungate, Marshland St. James, Outwell, Terrington St. John, Tipps End, Upwell, Walpole Highway, Walpole St Peter, Walpole St Andrew, Walsoken, Welney, West Walton	Fenland, King's Lynn and West Norfolk, East Cambridgeshire
PE15	MARCH	March, Benwick, Doddington, Manea, Wimblington	Fenland, Huntingdonshire
PE16	CHATTERIS	Chatteris, Swingbrow	Fenland, Huntingdonshire
PE19	ST. NEOTS	St Neots, Abbotsley, Buckden, Croxton, Diddington, Duloe, Eaton Ford, Eaton Socon, Eltisley, Eynesbury, Graveley, Great Paxton, Great Staughton, Hail Weston, Honeydon, Little Barford, Little Paxton, Offord Cluny, Southoe, Staploe, Toseland, Yelling	Huntingdonshire, South Cambridgeshire, Bedford, Central Bedfordshire
PE20	BOSTON	Algarkirk, Amber Hill, Bicker, Brothertoft, East Heckington, Fosdyke, Frampton, Kirton, Sutterton, Swineshead, Wigtoft	Boston, North Kesteven
PE21	BOSTON	Boston, Fishtoft, Wyberton	Boston
PE22	BOSTON	Benington, Butterwick, Carrington, Eastville, Freiston, Friskney, Frithville, Langrick, Leverton, Mareham-le-Fen, Moorby, New Bolingbroke, Old Leake, Revesby, Stickney, Wrangle	Boston, East Lindsey
PE23	SPILSBY	Spilsby, Asgarby, Aswardby, Bag Enderby, Dalby, East Kirkby, Firsby, Halton Holegate, Harrington, Keal Cotes, Langton, Mavis Enderby, Monksthorpe, Partney, Sausthorpe, Somersby	East Lindsey
PE24	SKEGNESS	Addlethorpe, Anderby, Anderby Creek, Ashington End, Bratoft, Burgh Le Marsh, Chapel St Leonards, Croft, Hogsthorpe, Orby, Wainfleet	East Lindsey
PE25	SKEGNESS	Skegness, Croft, Ingoldmells, Roman Bank	East Lindsey
PE26	HUNTINGDON	Ramsey, Bury, Ramsey Mereside, Upwood, Pondersbridge	Huntingdonshire, Fenland
PE27	ST. IVES	St Ives, Holywell, Needingworth	Huntingdonshire
PE28	HUNTINGDON	Huntingdon (outskirts), Abbots Ripton, Alconbury, Alconbury Weston, Barham, Bluntisham, Brampton, Broughton, Buckworth, Bythorn, Catworth, Colne, Coppingford, Covington, Earith, Easton, Ellington, Fenstanton, Glatton, Grafham, Great Gidding, Great Stukeley, Hamerton, Hartford, Hemingford Abbots, Hemingford Grey, Hilton, Houghton, Keyston, Kimbolton, Kings Ripton, Leighton Bromswold, Little Gidding, Little Stukeley, Lower Dean, Molesworth, Old Hurst, Old Weston, Perry, Pidley, Sawtry, Somersham, Spaldwick, Stow Longa, Tilbrook, Upper Dean, Warboys, Wennington, Winwick, Wistow, Woodhurst, Woodwalton, Woolley, Wyton	Huntingdonshire, Fenland, East Cambridgeshire, South Cambridgeshire, Bedford
PE29	HUNTINGDON	Huntingdon (most of), Godmanchester, Hartford, Hinchingbrooke	Huntingdonshire
PE30	KING'S LYNN	King's Lynn, North Wootton, South Wootton	King's Lynn and West Norfolk
PE31	KING'S LYNN	Brancaster, Burnham Thorpe, Heacham, Snettisham, Wolferton, Burnham Market	King's Lynn and West Norfolk
PE32	KING'S LYNN	East Lexham, East Winch, Leziate, Middleton, Mileham, Narborough	King's Lynn and West Norfolk, Breckland
PE33	KING'S LYNN	Barton Bendish, Fincham, Gooderstone, Oxborough	King's Lynn and West Norfolk, Breckland
PE34	KING'S LYNN	Clenchwarton, Islington, Stow Bardolph, Terrington St Clement, Tilney All Saints, Tilney St. Lawrence, Walpole Cross Keys, West Lynn, Wimbotsham	King's Lynn and West Norfolk
PE35	SANDRINGHAM	Sandringham	King's Lynn and West Norfolk
PE36	HUNSTANTON	Hunstanton, Holme, Ringstead, Sedgeford, Thornham	King's Lynn and West Norfolk
PE37	SWAFFHAM	Swaffham, Beachamwell, Cockley Cley, Necton, North Pickenham, South Pickenham	Breckland
PE38	DOWNHAM MARKET	Downham Market, Salters Lode	King's Lynn and West Norfolk, East Cambridgeshire
PE99	PETERBOROUGH		non-geographic

The original PE17 and PE18 districts for Huntingdon were recoded to PE26, PE27, PE28 and PE29 in late 1999. The St. Neots and St. Ives post towns were created at the same time, the PE19 district having formerly been part of the Huntingdon post town.

== Map ==
PE postcode area map, showing postcode districts in red and post towns in grey text, with links to nearby CB, IP, LE, LN, MK, NG, NN, NR and SG postcode areas.

== See also ==
- Postcode Address File
- List of postcode areas in the United Kingdom
