= Ramsey Mereside =

Village in Cambridgeshire, England

Coordinates: 52.489°N 0.106°W

- Location within Cambridgeshire
- OS grid reference: TL285896
- District: Huntingdonshire; Fenland
- Shire county: Cambridgeshire
- Region: East
- Country: England
- Sovereign state: United Kingdom
- Post town: HUNTINGDON
- Postcode district: PE26
- Police: Cambridgeshire
- Fire: Cambridgeshire
- Ambulance: East of England
- UK Parliament: North West Cambridgeshire; North East Cambridgeshire

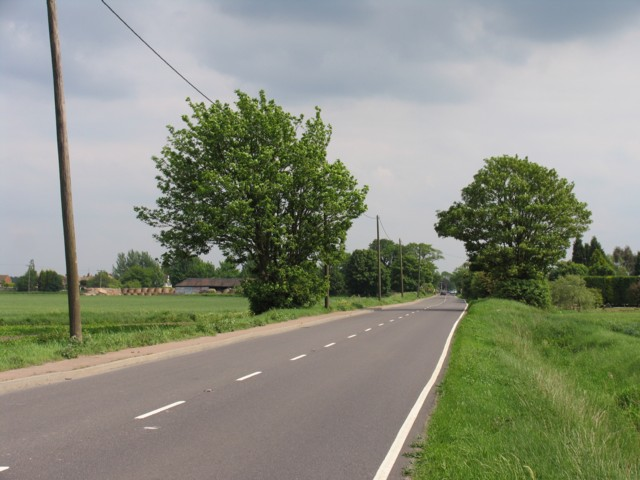

Ramsey Mereside, known colloquially as "The Village", is a small village approximately 3.5 miles (5.6 km) north of the town of Ramsey, Cambridgeshire . The Fenland Light Railway, a 7¼" gauge miniature railway is located in the village. The popular village hall holds many regular entertainment events.
