= Hartford, Cambridgeshire =

Suburb of Huntingdon, England

Coordinates: 52.341°N 0.158°W

Hartford
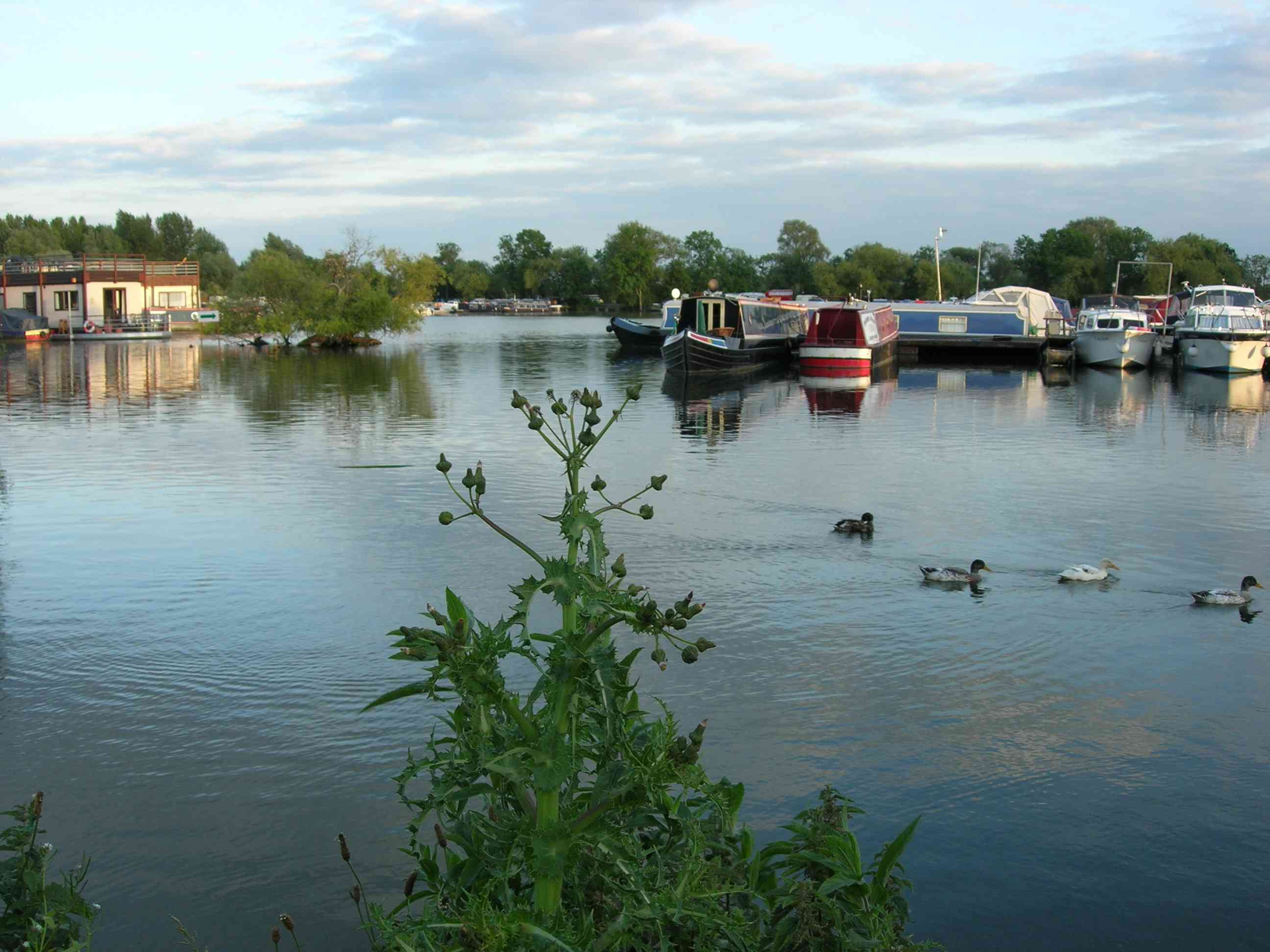
- Hartford Marina on the Great Ouse

- Location within Cambridgeshire
- OS grid reference: TL256730
- Civil parish: Huntingdon
- District: Huntingdonshire
- Shire county: Cambridgeshire
- Region: East
- Country: England
- Sovereign state: United Kingdom
- Post town: Huntingdon
- Postcode district: PE29
- Dialling code: 01480
- Police: Cambridgeshire
- Fire: Cambridgeshire
- Ambulance: East of England
- UK Parliament: Huntingdon

Hartford is a village on the eastern periphery of Huntingdon in Cambridgeshire, England. It lies on the A141 road and on the north bank of the River Great Ouse, upon which it has a significant marina, not far west of Wyton.

It is sometimes known as Hartford-cum-Sapley, and in the past has been known as Hereford by Huntingdon, Herford, Hertford and Harford. Formerly a separate civil parish in the county of Huntingdonshire, on 1 April 1935 the parish was abolished and merged with Huntingdon, part also went to Houghton and Wyton and Kings Ripton. Following suburban growth in 1970s, it is part of the town's contiguous built-up area. In 1931 the parish had a population of 464.

All Saints' Church in Hartford is a Church of England parish church, built in 1180 on the north riverbank. It is a grade II* listed building. The church has six bells.

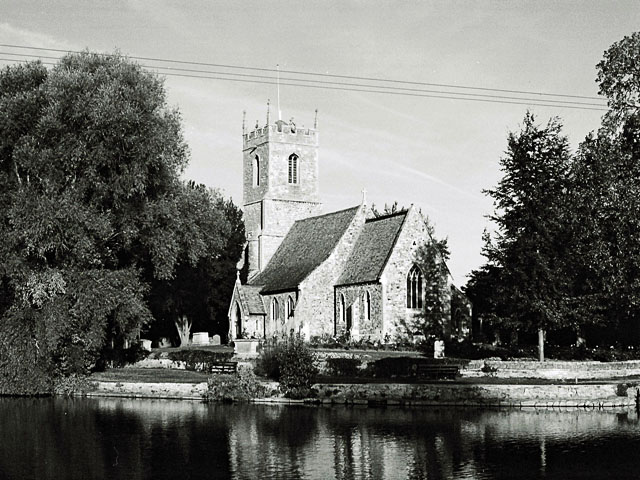
All Saints' Church

== History ==
=== Medieval Hartford ===
Despite the rival claim of Hertford, there is a case for identifying Hartford as the venue of the 672 Council of Hertford, the first general council of the Anglo-Saxon Church.

In 1085 William the Conqueror ordered that a survey should be carried out across England to discover who owned which parts and what it was worth. The survey took place in 1086 and the results were recorded in what, since the 12th century, has become known as Domesday Book. Starting with the king himself, for each landholder within a county there is a list of their estates or manors; and for each manor there is a summary of the resources of the manor, the amount of annual rent that was collected by the lord of the manor both in 1066 and in 1086, together with the taxable value.

Hartford was listed in Domesday Book in the Hundred of Hurstingstone in Huntingdonshire; the name of the settlement was written as Hereforde in Domesday Book. In 1086 there was just one manor at Hartford; the annual rent paid to the lord of the manor in 1066 had been £24 but had fallen to £15 in 1086.

Domesday Book records that there were 34 households at Hartford. There is no consensus about the average size of a household at that time; estimates range from 3.5 to 5.0 people. Using these figures then an estimate of the population of Hartford in 1086 is within the range of 119 and 170. Domesday Book uses a number of units of measure for areas of land that are now unfamiliar terms, such as hides and ploughlands. In different parts of the country these were terms for the area of land that a team of eight oxen could plough in a single season and are equivalent to 120 acres (49 hectares); this was the amount of land that was considered to be sufficient to support a single family. By 1086 the hide had become a unit of tax assessment rather than an actual land area; a hide was the amount of land that could be assessed at £1 for tax purposes. The survey records that there were twelve ploughlands at Hartford in 1086 and the capacity for a further five ploughlands. In addition to the arable land, there was 40 acres (16 hectares) of meadows, 1,892 acres (766 hectares) of woodland and two water mills.

The tax assessment in Domesday Book was known as geld or danegeld and was a type of land tax based on the hide or ploughland. It was originally a way of collecting a tribute to pay off the Danes when they attacked England and was levied only when necessary. Following the Norman Conquest, the geld was used to raise money for the King and to pay for continental wars; by 1130 the geld was being collected annually. The value of a manor's land and other assets having been determined, a tax of so many shillings and pence per pound of value would be levied on the landholder. While it was typically two shillings in the pound the amount did vary; for example in 1084 it was as high as six shillings in the pound. For the manor at Hartford the total tax assessed was 15 geld.

By 1086 there were two churches and a priest at Hartford.

The manor of Hartford remained in the possession of Huntingdon Priory until the dissolution of the monasteries in 1536.

== Demography ==
=== Population ===
In the period 1801 to 1901 the population of Hartford was recorded every ten years by the UK census. During this time the population was in the range of 283 (the lowest was in 1811) and 452 (the highest was in 1831).

From 1901, a census was taken every ten years with the exception of 1941 (due to the Second World War).

Parish	1911	1921	1931
Hartford	461	460	464

All population census figures from report Historic Census figures Cambridgeshire to 2011 by Cambridgeshire Insight.
