= Richard Astry =

English antiquary

Richard Astry (c. 1632 – 1714) was an English antiquary.

== Life ==
Astry was born in Huntingdonshire in or about 1632. He was admitted to Queens' College, Cambridge on 14 March 1647–48, proceeded B.A. in 1651 and in 1654 obtained from his college a grace for M.A., though that degree is not recorded in the university registers. After leaving the university he was elected an alderman of Huntingdon, and he was buried at St. Mary's in that town on 11 August 1714, aged 83.

== Works ==
He was, according to Thompson Cooper in the Dictionary of National Biography, the author of a quarto volume of collections, heraldic and topographical, relating Huntingdonshire, preserved in the Lansdowne MS. 921. The authorship of this manuscript, is also ascribed to Sir Robert Bruce Cotton. Thomas Baker made copious extracts from this work in the thirty-sixth volume of his manuscripts, which were later deposited in the University Library, Cambridge.

Astry also drew up Alphabetical Catalogues of English Surnames, with the arms belonging to them, and the particular times that the persons recorded lived; forming three volumes, formerly in the possession of the Rev. Henry Freeman, of Norman Cross.
