= Secret Garden Party =

Arts and music festival in England

Coordinates: 52.3793°N 0.1687°W

- Genre: Rock, World, Electronic, Reggae, Folk, Dance, House, Alternative
- Dates: July (4 days)
- Locations: Abbots Ripton, England
- Years active: 2002–2017, 2022–present
- Website: secretgardenparty.com

The Secret Garden Party (or SGP) is an independent arts and music festival held in Abbots Ripton, England. The location is on part of the grounds of a Georgian farmhouse and has its own lakes, river and landscaped gardens. The festival was launched by Fred Fellowes and James Whewell in 2004 as an alternative to the established mainstream music festivals. The first series ended in 2017.

During its initial 15-year run, The Secret Garden Party won the UK Festival Award for Best Small-Sized Festival in 2005 and 2008, and then the Award for Best Medium-Sized Festival in 2011. It also won the Act of Independence award from the Association of Independent Festivals (AIF) for its work with The Loop, a harm reduction charity that tested drugs on site during the event. This practice has now been adopted by some other UK festivals.

The festival returned in summer 2022, from 21 to 24 July 2022 in Cambridgeshire.

== Related events ==
The 2009 Secret Garden Party Valentines Bacchanalia Ball, named after annual parties held in honour of the Greek god Dionysus, took place on 28 February at the Dex Club in Brixton, London.

Secret Garden Party's co-organizers, Secret Productions, teamed up with Thai production company Scratch First to produce the inaugural Wonderfruit - a sustainable lifestyle festival in Thailand.
