= Wistow, Cambridgeshire =

Village in Cambridgeshire, England

Coordinates: 52.42°N 0.12°W

Wistow
- Location within Cambridgeshire
- Population: 522 (2011)
- OS grid reference: TL280815
- District: Huntingdonshire
- Shire county: Cambridgeshire
- Region: East
- Country: England
- Sovereign state: United Kingdom
- Post town: Huntingdon
- Postcode district: PE28
- Police: Cambridgeshire
- Fire: Cambridgeshire
- Ambulance: East of England
- UK Parliament: North West Cambridgeshire

Wistow is a village and civil parish in Cambridgeshire, England. Wistow lies approximately 6 miles (10 km) north-east of Huntingdon, near Warboys. Wistow is situated within Huntingdonshire which is a non-metropolitan district of Cambridgeshire as well as being a historic county of England.

Wistow has also been known as:

- Wystowe (10th century, 12th century),
- Kingestune (id est Wistow 10th century),
- Kingestune (11th century).

Wistow is a small, rural village located in a small secluded valley off the Ramsey to St. Ives road, through which runs Bury Brook. Wistow is a farming community that has grown up around the central features of its church and manor house.

== History ==
In 1085 William the Conqueror ordered that a survey should be carried out across his kingdom to discover who owned which parts and what it was worth. The survey took place in 1086 and the results were recorded in what, since the 12th century, has become known as the Domesday Book. Starting with the king himself, for each landholder within a county there is a list of their estates or manors; and, for each manor, there is a summary of the resources of the manor, the amount of annual rent that was collected by the lord of the manor both in 1066 and in 1086, together with the taxable value.

Wistow was listed in the Domesday Book in the Hundred of Hurstingstone in Huntingdonshire; the name of the settlement was written as Wistou in the Domesday Book. In 1086 there was just one manor at Wistow; the annual rent paid to the lord of the manor in 1066 had been £9 and the rent had fallen to £8 in 1086.

The Domesday Book does not explicitly detail the population of a place but it records that there were 33 households at Wistow. There is no consensus about the average size of a household at that time; estimates range from 3.5 to 5.0 people per household. Using these figures then an estimate of the population of Wistow in 1086 is that it was within the range of 115 and 165 people.

The Domesday Book uses a number of units of measure for areas of land that are now unfamiliar terms, such as hides and ploughlands. In different parts of the country, these were terms for the area of land that a team of eight oxen could plough in a single season and are equivalent to 120 acres (49 hectares); this was the amount of land that was considered to be sufficient to support a single family. By 1086, the hide had become a unit of tax assessment rather than an actual land area; a hide was the amount of land that could be assessed as £1 for tax purposes. The survey records that there were thirteen ploughlands at Wistow in 1086 and that there was the capacity for a further three ploughlands. In addition to the arable land, there was 24 acres (10 hectares) of meadows, 1,892 acres (766 hectares) of woodland and a water mill at Wistow.

The tax assessment in the Domesday Book was known as geld or danegeld and was a type of land-tax based on the hide or ploughland. It was originally a way of collecting a tribute to pay off the Danes when they attacked England, and was only levied when necessary. Following the Norman Conquest, the geld was used to raise money for the King and to pay for continental wars; by 1130, the geld was being collected annually. Having determined the value of a manor's land and other assets, a tax of so many shillings and pence per pound of value would be levied on the land holder. While this was typically two shillings in the pound the amount did vary; for example, in 1084 it was as high as six shillings in the pound. For the manor at Wistow the total tax assessed was nine geld.

By 1086 there was already a church and a priest at Wistow.

== Government ==
As a civil parish, Wistow has a parish council. The parish council is elected by the residents of the parish who have registered on the electoral roll; the parish council is the lowest tier of government in England. A parish council is responsible for providing and maintaining a variety of local services including allotments and a cemetery; grass cutting and tree planting within public open spaces such as a village green or playing fields. The parish council reviews all planning applications that might affect the parish and makes recommendations to Huntingdonshire District Council, which is the local planning authority for the parish. The parish council also represents the views of the parish on issues such as local transport, policing and the environment. The parish council raises its own tax to pay for these services, known as the parish precept, which is collected as part of the Council Tax. The parish council consists of five elected parish councillors and has a parish clerk; the parish council normally meets on the last Tuesday of the month in the village hall. The parish precept for the financial year ending 31 March 2015 was £10, 500.

Wistow was in the historic and administrative county of Huntingdonshire until 1965. From 1965, the village was part of the new administrative county of Huntingdon and Peterborough. Then in 1974, following the Local Government Act 1972, Wistow became a part of the county of Cambridgeshire.

The second tier of local government is Huntingdonshire District Council which is a non-metropolitan district of Cambridgeshire and has its headquarters in Huntingdon. Huntingdonshire District Council has 52 councillors representing 29 district wards. Huntingdonshire District Council collects the council tax, and provides services such as building regulations, local planning, environmental health, leisure and tourism. Wistow is a part of the district ward of Warboys and Bury and is represented on the district council by two councillors. District councillors serve for four-year terms following elections to Huntingdonshire District Council.

For Wistow the highest tier of local government is Cambridgeshire County Council which has administration buildings in Cambridge. The county council provides county-wide services such as major road infrastructure, fire and rescue, education, social services, libraries and heritage services. Cambridgeshire County Council consists of 69 councillors representing 60 electoral divisions. Wistow is part of the electoral division of Warboys and Upwood and is represented on the county council by one councillor.

At Westminster Wistow is in the parliamentary constituency of North West Cambridgeshire, and elects one Member of Parliament (MP) by the first past the post system of election. Wistow is represented in the House of Commons by Shailesh Vara (Conservative). Shailesh Vara has represented the constituency since 2005. The previous member of parliament was Brian Mawhinney (Conservative) who represented the constituency between 1997 and 2005.

== Geography ==
The parish of Wistow consists of a strip of land running north-east and south-west (some 4 miles long) and of varying breadth. It is crossed by the high road from Ramsey to St. Ives at a distance of 2 1/2 miles from Ramsey. Rather more than half the parish is on the west side of this road. In early days the possession of a portion of the fen for the supply of reeds for thatching, fuel, and summer grazing for stock, was very important, and to obtain these advantages Wistow was connected with the fen by a narrow strip of land about 300 yards wide. The parish contains 2,408 acres, of which 1,853 acres are arable, including fen, 405 acres pasture, 80 acres and 3 roods wood.

The village is rather more than half a mile west of the road from Ramsey to St. Ives, and on the west side of a brook that rises in Abbots Ripton and crosses Kings Ripton; it then partly bounds and partly passes through Wistow, emptying itself at Ramsey into the Fen drainage system. The compact little village is on a slight slope facing east, all but thirteen houses being within a quarter of a mile of the church. It is principally ranged round roads forming an irregular four-sided figure with the church at the south-west corner.

== Demography ==
=== Population ===
In the period 1801 to 1901 the population of Wistow was recorded every ten years by the UK census. During this time the population was in the range of 315 (the lowest was in 1801) and 553 (the highest was in 1851).

From 1901, a census was taken every ten years with the exception of 1941 (due to the Second World War).

Parish	1911	1921	1931	1951	1961	1971	1981	1991	2001	2011
Wistow	370	294	345	353	348	483	568	474	527	522

All population census figures from report Historic Census figures Cambridgeshire to 2011 by Cambridgeshire Insight.

In 2011, the parish covered an area of 2,036 acres (824 hectares) and the population density of Wistow in 2011 was 164.1 persons per square mile (63.3 per square kilometre).

== Culture and community ==
The church is partly Norman, with some 15th-century painted glass. The manor house dates in part from the early 17th century, whilst timber-framed houses include the 16th- and 17th-century Rooks Grove Farm, Lodes Cottage, Porch House, Thatch Cottage and Lavender Cottage.

After the closure of the thatched pub, the Three Horseshoes, a group of residents established a community pop-up pub in the village hall called Keep Wistow Flowing.
