= Tipps End =

Hamlet in Cambridgeshire, England

Coordinates: 52.531011°N 0.217653°E

- Tipps End

- Location within Norfolk
- OS grid reference: TL505948
- Civil parish: Welney
- District: King's Lynn and West Norfolk
- Shire county: Norfolk
- Region: East
- Country: England
- Sovereign state: United Kingdom
- Post town: Wisbech
- Postcode district: PE14
- Dialling code: 01354
- UK Parliament: South West Norfolk

Tipps End is an English hamlet on the B1100 road between Welney and Christchurch, Cambridgeshire. It is also sometimes referred to as "Tips End". It is on the border of the Isle of Ely, Cambridgeshire and Norfolk, 8 kilometres (5.0 mi) to the east of March, Cambridgeshire.

== Notable residents ==
- Captain Tom Moore, fundraiser
