= Broughton, Cambridgeshire =

Village in Cambridgeshire, England

Coordinates: 52.38°N 0.12°W

Broughton
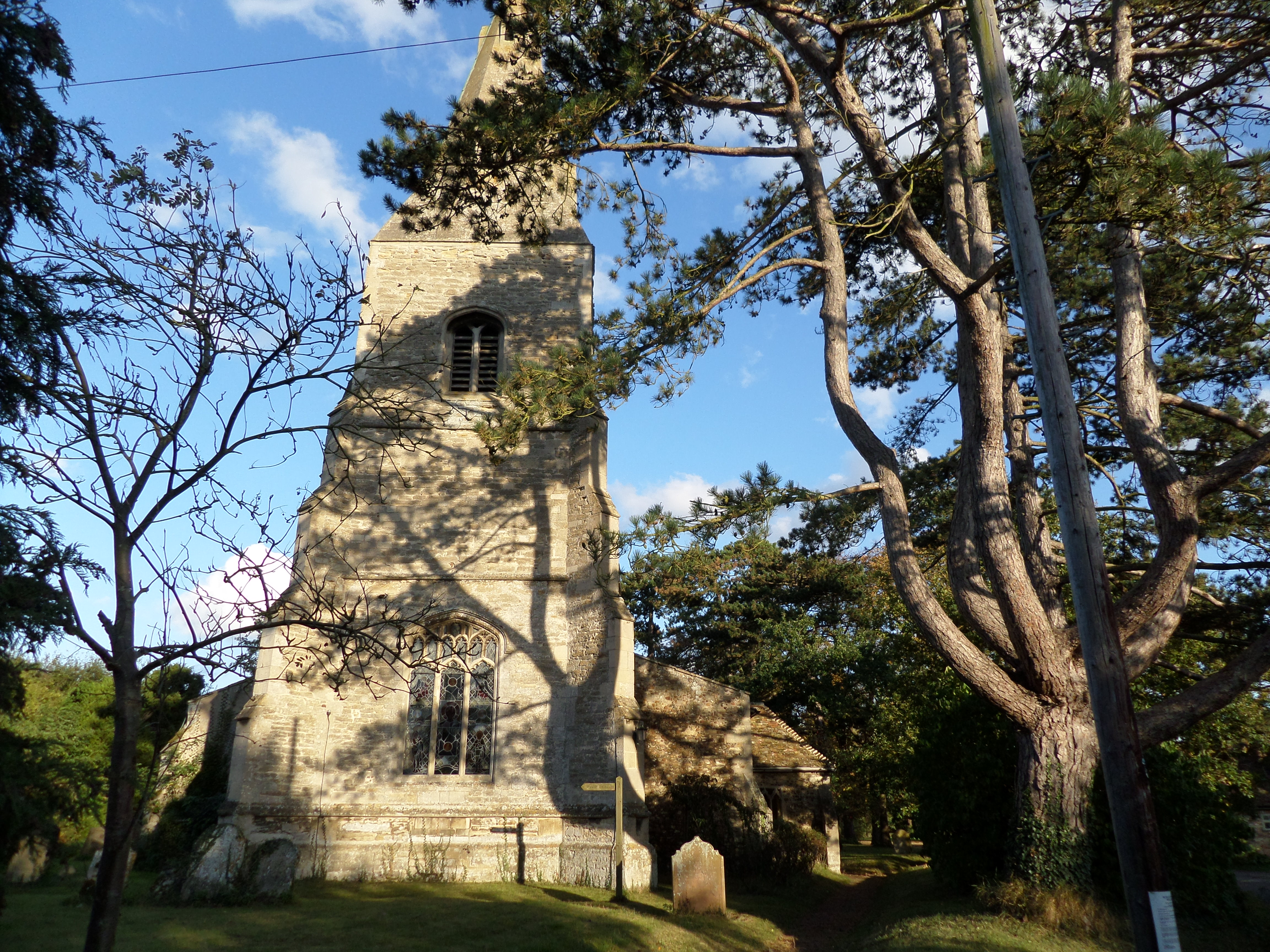
- Church of All Saints, Broughton

- Location within Cambridgeshire
- Population: 237 (2011 Census)
- OS grid reference: TL279774
- District: Huntingdonshire
- Shire county: Cambridgeshire
- Region: East
- Country: England
- Sovereign state: United Kingdom
- Post town: Huntingdon
- Postcode district: PE28
- Police: Cambridgeshire
- Fire: Cambridgeshire
- Ambulance: East of England
- UK Parliament: North West Cambridgeshire

Broughton is a village and civil parish in the Huntingdonshire district of Cambridgeshire, England, around six miles north of Huntingdon. Broughton is situated within Huntingdonshire which is a non-metropolitan district of Cambridgeshire as well as being a historic county of England. According to the UK census of 2001 it had a population of 241, reducing to 237 at the 2011 census.

== History ==
In 1085 William the Conqueror ordered that a survey should be carried out across his kingdom to discover who owned which parts and what it was worth. The survey took place in 1086 and the results were recorded in what, since the 12th century, has become known as the Domesday Book. Starting with the king himself, for each landholder within a county there is a list of their estates or manors; and, for each manor, there is a summary of the resources of the manor, the amount of annual rent that was collected by the lord of the manor both in 1066 and in 1086, together with the taxable value.

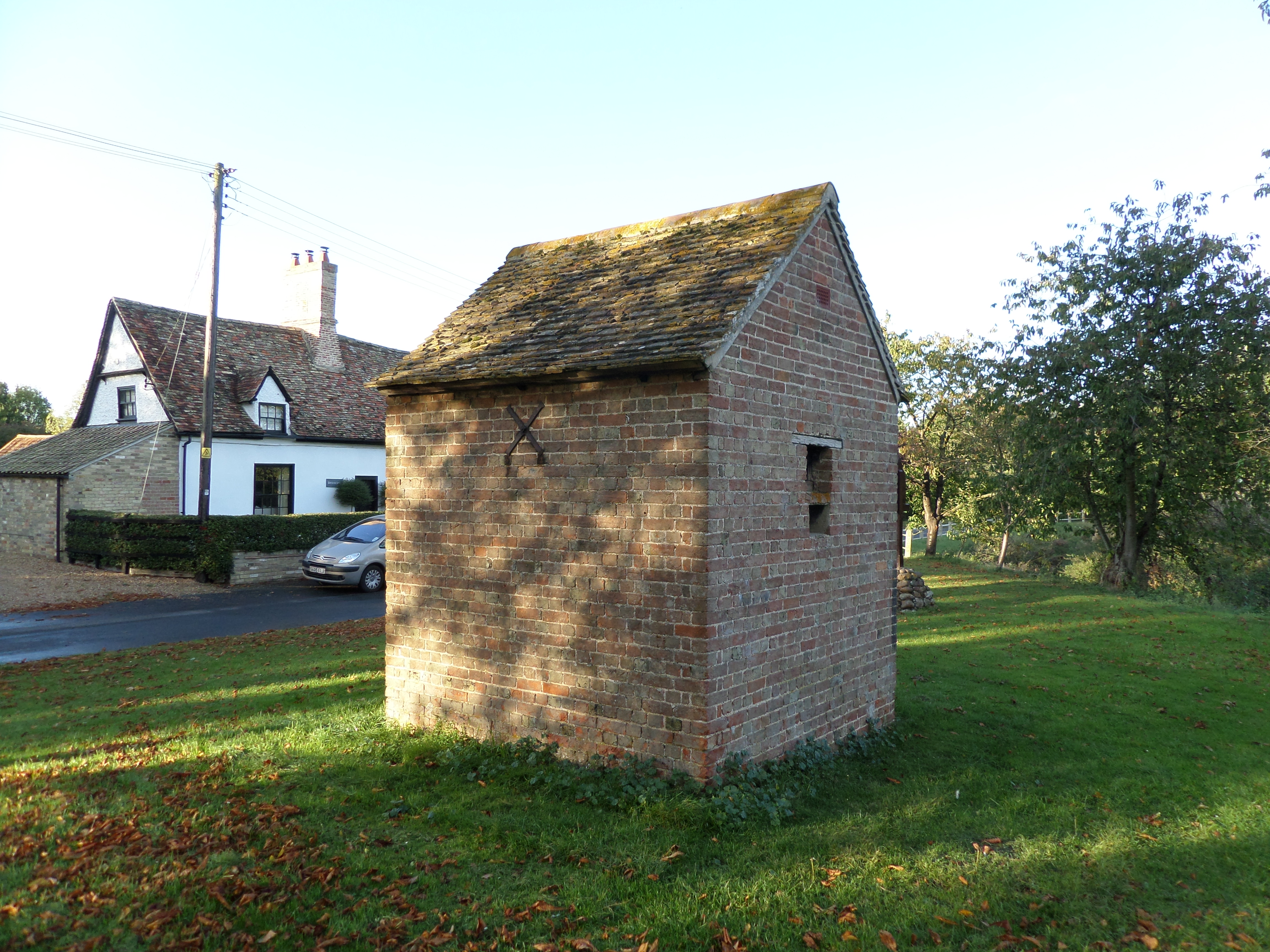
The old jail at Broughton

Broughton was listed in the Domesday Book in the Hundred of Hurstingstone in Huntingdonshire; the name of the settlement was written as Broctone and Broctune in the Domesday Book. In 1086 there was just one manor at Broughton; the annual rent paid to the lord of the manor in 1066 had been £9 and the rent had increased to £10 in 1086.

The Domesday Book does not explicitly detail the population of a place but it records that there were 31 households at Broughton. There is no consensus about the average size of a household at that time; estimates range from 3.5 to 5.0 people per household. Using these figures then an estimate of the population of Broughton in 1086 is that it was within the range of 108 and 155 people.

The Domesday Book uses a number of units of measure for areas of land that are now unfamiliar terms, such as hides and ploughlands. In different parts of the country, these were terms for the area of land that a team of eight oxen could plough in a single season and are equivalent to 120 acres (49 hectares); this was the amount of land that was considered to be sufficient to support a single family. By 1086, the hide had become a unit of tax assessment rather than an actual land area; a hide was the amount of land that could be assessed as £1 for tax purposes. The survey records that there was 14 ploughlands at Broughton in 1086 and that there was the capacity for a further 2 ploughlands. In addition to the arable land, there was 10 acres (4 hectares) of meadows and 60 acres (24 hectares) of woodland and a water mill at Broughton.

The tax assessment in the Domesday Book was known as geld or danegeld and was a type of land-tax based on the hide or ploughland. It was originally a way of collecting a tribute to pay off the Danes when they attacked England, and was only levied when necessary. Following the Norman Conquest, the geld was used to raise money for the King and to pay for continental wars; by 1130, the geld was being collected annually. Having determined the value of a manor's land and other assets, a tax of so many shillings and pence per pound of value would be levied on the land holder. While this was typically two shillings in the pound the amount did vary; for example, in 1084 it was as high as six shillings in the pound. For the manor at Broughton the total tax assessed was 9 geld.

By 1086 there was already a church and a priest at Broughton.

== Government ==
As a civil parish, Broughton has a parish council. The parish council is elected by the residents of the parish who have registered on the electoral roll; the parish council is the lowest tier of government in England. A parish council is responsible for providing and maintaining a variety of local services including allotments and a cemetery; grass cutting and tree planting within public open spaces such as a village green or playing fields. The parish council reviews all planning applications that might affect the parish and makes recommendations to Huntingdonshire District Council, which is the local planning authority for the parish. The parish council also represents the views of the parish on issues such as local transport, policing and the environment. The parish council raises its own tax to pay for these services, known as the parish precept, which is collected as part of the Council Tax.

Broughton was in the historic and administrative county of Huntingdonshire until 1965. From 1965, the village was part of the new administrative county of Huntingdon and Peterborough. Then in 1974, following the Local Government Act 1972, Broughton became a part of the county of Cambridgeshire.

The second tier of local government is Huntingdonshire District Council which is a non-metropolitan district of Cambridgeshire and has its headquarters in Huntingdon. Huntingdonshire District Council has 52 councillors representing 29 district wards. Huntingdonshire District Council collects the council tax, and provides services such as building regulations, local planning, environmental health, leisure and tourism. Broughton is a part of the district ward of Somersham and is represented on the district council by two councillors. District councillors serve for four-year terms following elections to Huntingdonshire District Council.

For Broughton the highest tier of local government is Cambridgeshire County Council which has administration buildings in Cambridge. The county council provides county-wide services such as major road infrastructure, fire and rescue, education, social services, libraries and heritage services. Cambridgeshire County Council consists of 69 councillors representing 60 electoral divisions. Broughton is a part of the electoral division of Somersham and Earith and is represented on the county council by one councillor. County councillors serve for four-year terms following elections to Cambridgeshire County Council.

At Westminster, Broughton is in the parliamentary constituency of Huntingdon, and elects one Member of Parliament (MP) by the first past the post system of election. Broughton is represented in the House of Commons by Ben Obese-Jecty (Conservative). Prior to the 2023 boundary review, Broughton was part of North West Cambridgeshire and represented in parliament by Shailesh Vara.

== Demography ==
=== Population ===
In the period 1801 to 1901 the population of Broughton was recorded every ten years by the UK census. During this time the population was in the range of 264 (the lowest in 1901) and 416 (the highest in 1851).

From 1901, a census was taken every ten years with the exception of 1941 (due to the Second World War).

Parish	1911	1921	1931	1951	1961	1971	1981	1991	2001	2011
Broughton	260	226	261	266	227	212	188	210	241	237

All population census figures from report Historic Census figures Cambridgeshire to 2011 by Cambridgeshire Insight.

In 2011, the parish covered an area of 2,372 acres (960 hectares) and so the population density for Broughton in 2011 was 63.9 persons per square mile (24.7 per square kilometre).

== Notable people ==
Eric Broadley founder of Lola Cars previously resided in Broughton.
