= Wyton, Cambridgeshire =

Village in Cambridgeshire, England

Coordinates: 52.33°N 0.13°W

Wyton
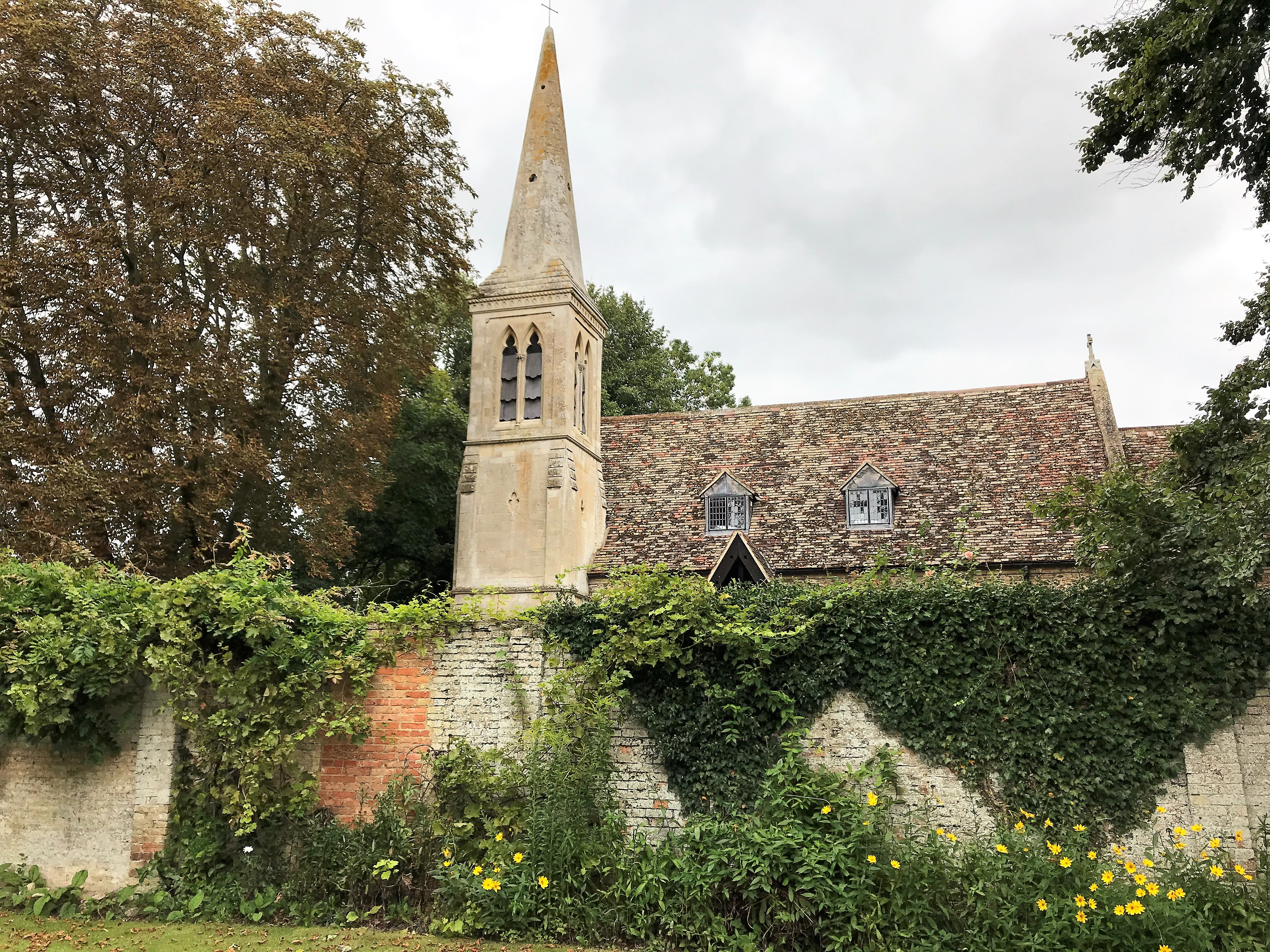

- Location within Cambridgeshire
- OS grid reference: TL271722
- Civil parish: Houghton and Wyton
- District: Huntingdonshire
- Shire county: Cambridgeshire
- Region: East
- Country: England
- Sovereign state: United Kingdom
- Post town: Huntingdon
- Postcode district: PE28
- Police: Cambridgeshire
- Fire: Cambridgeshire
- Ambulance: East of England
- UK Parliament: Huntingdon

Wyton is a village and former civil parish, now in the parish of Houghton and Wyton, in Cambridgeshire, England. It lies approximately 2 miles (3 km) east of Huntingdon. Wyton is connected to the village of Houghton, so much so that the two settlements are rarely regarded as separate. Wyton is situated within Huntingdonshire, a non-metropolitan district of Cambridgeshire as well as being a historic county of England. In 1931 the parish had a population of 445.

Wyton lies about a mile south of RAF Wyton.

== History ==
In 1085 William the Conqueror ordered that a survey should be carried out across his kingdom to discover who owned which parts and what it was worth. The survey took place in 1086 and the results were recorded in what, since the 12th century, has become known as the Domesday Book. Starting with the king himself, for each landholder within a county there is a list of their estates or manors; and, for each manor, there is a summary of the resources of the manor, the amount of annual rent that was collected by the lord of the manor both in 1066 and in 1086, together with the taxable value.

Wyton was listed in the Domesday Book in the Hundred of Hurstingstone in Huntingdonshire; the name of the settlement was written as Witune in the Domesday Book. In 1086 there was just one manor at Wyton; the annual rent paid to the lord of the manor in 1066 had been £7 and the rent was the same in 1086.

The Domesday Book does not explicitly detail the population of a place but it records that there was 30 households at Wyton. There is no consensus about the average size of a household at that time; estimates range from 3.5 to 5.0 people per household. Using these figures then an estimate of the population of Wyton in 1086 is that it was within the range of 105 and 150 people.

The Domesday Book uses a number of units of measure for areas of land that are now unfamiliar terms, such as hides and ploughlands. In different parts of the country, these were terms for the area of land that a team of eight oxen could plough in a single season and are equivalent to 120 acres (49 hectares); this was the amount of land that was considered to be sufficient to support a single family. By 1086, the hide had become a unit of tax assessment rather than an actual land area; a hide was the amount of land that could be assessed as £1 for tax purposes. The survey records that there were ten ploughlands at Wyton in 1086. In addition to the arable land, there was 40 acres (16 hectares) of meadows and a water mill at Wyton.

The tax assessment in the Domesday Book was known as geld or danegeld and was a type of land-tax based on the hide or ploughland. It was originally a way of collecting a tribute to pay off the Danes when they attacked England, and was only levied when necessary. Following the Norman Conquest, the geld was used to raise money for the King and to pay for continental wars; by 1130, the geld was being collected annually. Having determined the value of a manor's land and other assets, a tax of so many shillings and pence per pound of value would be levied on the land holder. While this was typically two shillings in the pound the amount did vary; for example, in 1084 it was as high as six shillings in the pound. For the manor at Wyton the total tax assessed was seven geld.

By 1086 there was already a church and a priest at Wyton.

== Government ==
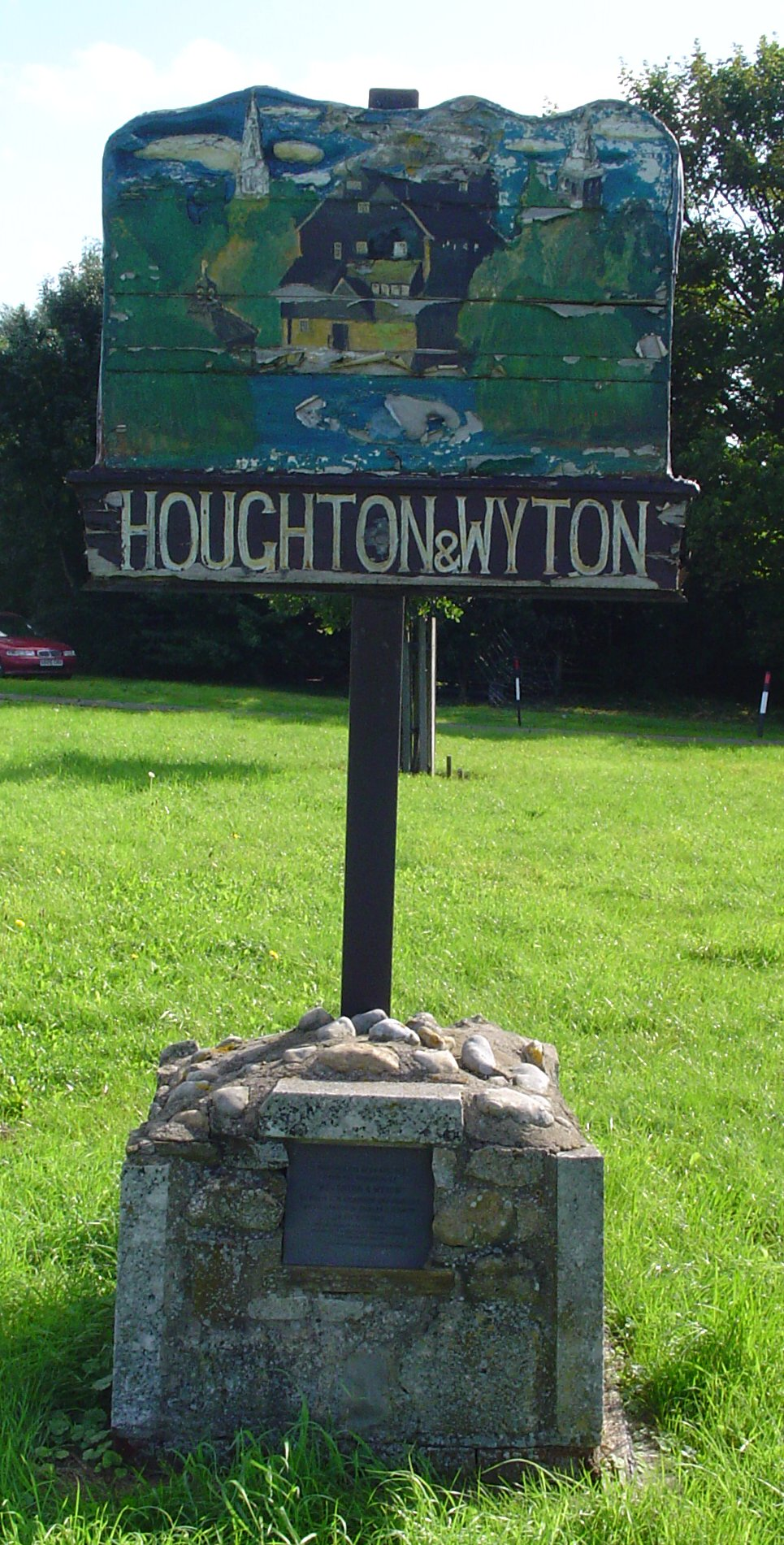
Signpost in Houghton & Wyton

Wyton is part of the civil parish of Houghton and Wyton, which has a parish council. The parish council is elected by the residents of the parish who have registered on the electoral roll; the parish council is the lowest tier of government in England. A parish council is responsible for providing and maintaining a variety of local services including allotments and a cemetery; grass cutting and tree planting within public open spaces such as a village green or playing fields. The parish council reviews all planning applications that might affect the parish and makes recommendations to Huntingdonshire District Council, which is the local planning authority for the parish. The parish council also represents the views of the parish on issues such as local transport, policing and the environment. The parish council raises its own tax to pay for these services, known as the parish precept, which is collected as part of the Council Tax. The parish council has nine councillors and meets approximately every two weeks through the year. On 1 April 1935 the parish of Wyton was abolished to form "Houghton and Wyton".

Wyton was in the historic and administrative county of Huntingdonshire until 1965. From 1965, the village was part of the new administrative county of Huntingdon and Peterborough. Then in 1974, following the Local Government Act 1972, Wyton became a part of the county of Cambridgeshire.

The second tier of local government is Huntingdonshire District Council which is a non-metropolitan district of Cambridgeshire and has its headquarters in Huntingdon. Huntingdonshire District Council has 52 councillors representing 29 district wards. Huntingdonshire District Council collects the council tax, and provides services such as building regulations, local planning, environmental health, leisure and tourism. Wyton is a part of the district ward of The Hemingfords and is represented on the district council by two councillors. District councillors serve for four-year terms following elections to Huntingdonshire District Council.

For Wyton the highest tier of local government is Cambridgeshire County Council which has administration buildings in Cambridge. The county council provides county-wide services such as major road infrastructure, fire and rescue, education, social services, libraries and heritage services. Cambridgeshire County Council consists of 69 councillors representing 60 electoral divisions. Wyton is part of the electoral division of The Hemingfords and Fen Stanton and is represented on the county council by one councillor.

At Westminster Wyton is in the parliamentary constituency of Huntingdon, and elects one Member of Parliament (MP) by the first past the post system of election. Wyton is represented in the House of Commons by Jonathan Djanogly (Conservative). Jonathan Djanogly has represented the constituency since 2001. The previous member of parliament was John Major (Conservative) who represented the constituency between 1983 and 2001.

== Demography ==
=== Population ===
In the period 1801 to 1901 the population of the separate parishes of Houghton and Wyton was recorded every ten years by the UK census. During this time the population was in the range of 467 (the lowest was in 1901) and 818 (the highest was in 1871).

From 1901, a census was taken every ten years with the exception of 1941 (due to the Second World War).

Parish	1911	1921	1931	1951	1961	1971	1981	1991	2001	2011
Houghton	350	315	321							
Wyton	169	323	445							
Houghton and Wyton	519	638	766	2437	2908	4114	3699	3363	2559	1817

All population census figures from report Historic Census figures Cambridgeshire to 2011 by Cambridgeshire Insight. The separate parishes of Houghton and Wyton were combined into a single parish in 1935. Part of this parish's area was separated as a new parish of Wyton on the Hill in 2010.

In 2011, the parish covered an area of 1,623 acres (657 hectares) and so the population density of Houghton and Wyton in 2011 was 716.5 persons per square mile (276.6 per square kilometre).
