= Old Hurst =

Village in Cambridgeshire, England

Coordinates: 52°22′36″N 0°05′30″W

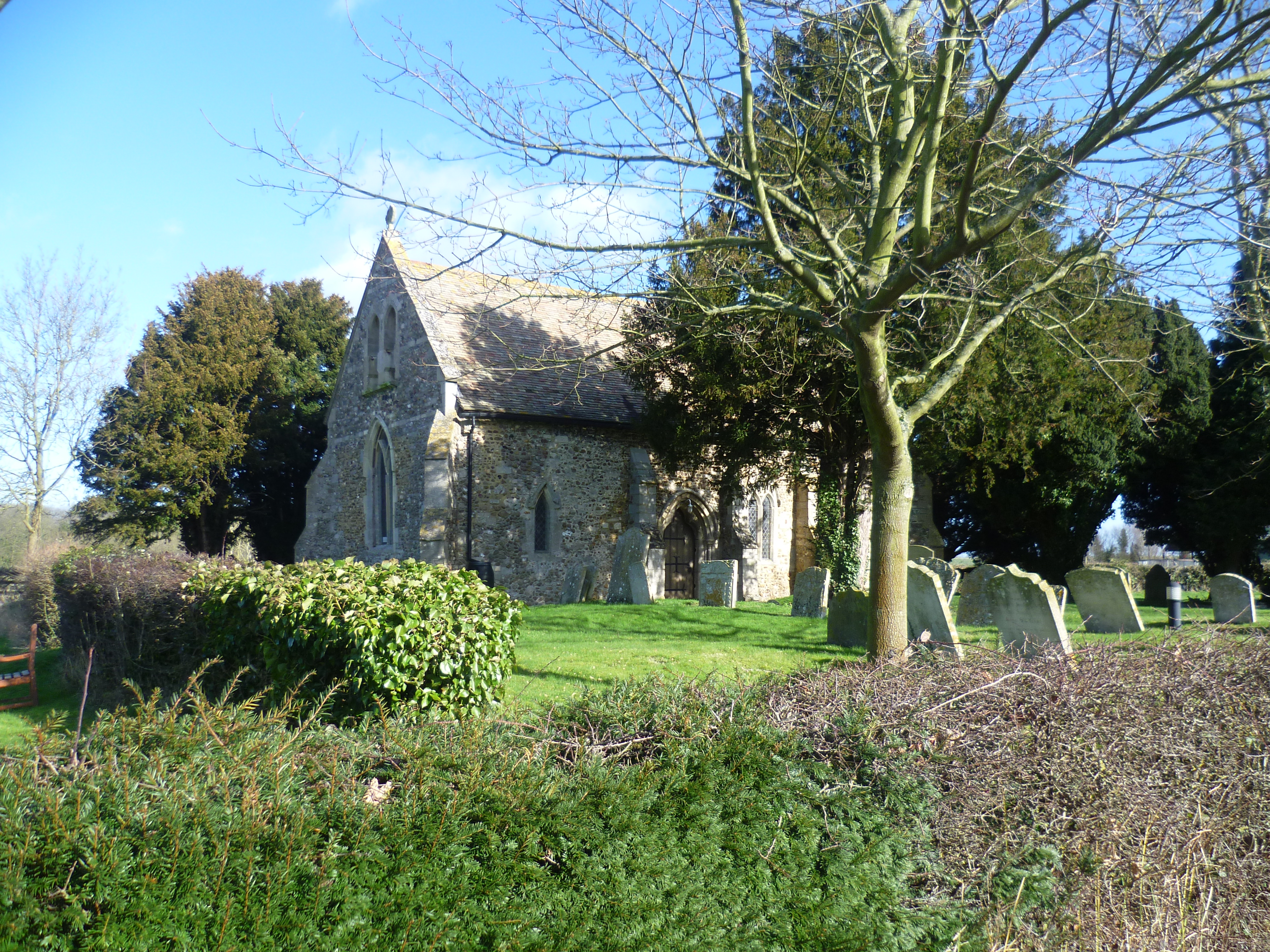
- St Peter's Parish Church

- Location within Cambridgeshire
- Population: 256 (2011)
- OS grid reference: TL3077
- Shire county: Cambridgeshire
- Region: East
- Country: England
- Sovereign state: United Kingdom
- Post town: Huntingdon
- Postcode district: PE28
- Police: Cambridgeshire
- Fire: Cambridgeshire
- Ambulance: East of England
- UK Parliament: North West Cambridgeshire

Old Hurst is a village and civil parish in Cambridgeshire, England, approximately 5 miles (8 km) north-east of Huntingdon. It is situated within Huntingdonshire which is a non-metropolitan district of Cambridgeshire as well as being a historic county of England. The small Parish Church of St Peter's dates from the 13th century and is a Grade II* listed building.

At one time, at the most prominent point along the road between Old Hurst and St Ives, there could be found a low chair-shaped hunk of stone called the Hursting Stone, or the Abbot's Chair. This glacial relic served many functions throughout the centuries, having been sculpted into a curious chair-shaped mass: folklore has it that it in the Middle Ages it formed the base of a plinth that held an almighty stone cross upright. Here, sentences were passed in open-air trials. Later it earned the name 'Abbot's Chair' from the belief that monks would sit in it and rest while travelling. This antiquity now rests against a wall just outside the Norris Museum in St Ives and, according to the writer Daniel Codd, there is a belief that it is haunted. There is also a belief that if the stone should ever sink beneath the earth then the streets of Bluntisham would run red with blood. Hurstingstone was a hundred of Huntingdonshire.

== Government ==
As a civil parish, Old Hurst has a parish council. The parish council is elected by the residents of the parish who have registered on the electoral roll; the parish council is the lowest tier of government in England. A parish council is responsible for providing and maintaining a variety of local services including allotments and a cemetery; grass cutting and tree planting within public open spaces such as a village green or playing fields. The parish council reviews all planning applications that might affect the parish and makes recommendations to Huntingdonshire District Council, which is the local planning authority for the parish. The parish council also represents the views of the parish on issues such as local transport, policing and the environment. The parish council raises its own tax to pay for these services, known as the parish precept, which is collected as part of the Council Tax. The parish council comprises seven councillors and there is a parish clerk.

Old Hurst was in the historic and administrative county of Huntingdonshire until 1965. From 1965, the village was part of the new administrative county of Huntingdon and Peterborough. In 1974, following the Local Government Act 1972, Old Hurst became a part of the county of Cambridgeshire.

The second tier of local government is Huntingdonshire District Council which is a non-metropolitan district of Cambridgeshire and has its headquarters in Huntingdon. Huntingdonshire District Council has 52 councillors representing 29 district wards. Huntingdonshire District Council collects the council tax, and provides services such as building regulations, local planning, environmental health, leisure and tourism. Old Hurst is a part of the district ward of Somersham and is represented on the district council by two councillors. District councillors serve for four-year terms following elections to Huntingdonshire District Council.

For Old Hurst the highest tier of local government is Cambridgeshire County Council which has administration buildings in Cambridge. The county council provides county-wide services such as major road infrastructure, fire and rescue, education, social services, libraries and heritage services. Cambridgeshire County Council consists of 69 councillors representing 60 electoral divisions. Old Hurst is part of the electoral division of Somersham and Earith and is represented on the county council by one councillor.

Old Hurst is in the parliamentary constituency of North West Cambridgeshire, and elects one Member of Parliament (MP) by the first past the post system of election. Old Hurst has been represented in the House of Commons since 2005 by Shailesh Vara (Conservative). The previous MP was Brian Mawhinney (Conservative) who represented the constituency between 1997 and 2005.

== Demography ==
=== Population ===
In the period 1801 to 1901 the population of Old Hurst was recorded every ten years by the UK census. During this time, the population was in the range of 103 (in 1901) and 182 (in 1841).

From 1901, a census was taken every ten years with the exception of 1941 (due to the Second World War).

Parish	1911	1921	1931	1951	1961	1971	1981	1991	2001	2011
Old Hurst	98	94	89	267	269	263	236	228	249	256

All population census figures from report Historic Census figures Cambridgeshire to 2011 by Cambridgeshire Insight.

In 2011, the parish covered an area of 1,043 acres (422 hectares) and the population density of Old Hurst in 2011 was 157.1 persons per square mile (60.7 per square kilometre).
