= Bury, Cambridgeshire =

Village in Cambridgeshire, England

Coordinates: 52.44°N 0.11°W

Bury
- Location within Cambridgeshire
- Population: 1,838 (2011)
- OS grid reference: TL284841
- District: Huntingdonshire
- Shire county: Cambridgeshire
- Region: East
- Country: England
- Sovereign state: United Kingdom
- Post town: Huntingdon
- Postcode district: PE26
- Police: Cambridgeshire
- Fire: Cambridgeshire
- Ambulance: East of England
- UK Parliament: North West Cambridgeshire

Bury is a village and civil parish in Cambridgeshire, England. Bury lies approximately 7 miles (11 km) north/north east of Huntingdon and is near to Ramsey and St Ives. Bury is situated within Huntingdonshire which is a non-metropolitan district of Cambridgeshire as well as being a historic county of England.

== History ==
Bury and Hepmangrove, under the name of Bury-cum-Hepmangrove, appear to have originally been separate manors but were united for certain purposes before the Dissolution of the Monasteries in 1538.

Known as:

- Biri, Byrig (10th century),
- Byri (12th century),
- Byry (13th century).
- Hegmangrave (11th century),
- Hecmundegrave (12th century),
- Heitmundgrave,
- Hetumgrove, Heytmongrave (14th century).

The parish lies to the South of Ramsey and is of a very irregular shape, projecting a considerable distance into the fen on the east side of the road from Ramsey to St Ives. The land rises on both sides of the Brook which runs through the parish from north-east to south-west from 16 feet above ordnance datum at the Brook to 66 ft. on the north-east side, and 50 ft. on the south-west. All of the fenland and much of the highland is ploughed. The soil is a strong black loam and the sub-soil is clay. The main crops are wheat, oats, beans and peas on the highland, and potatoes, celery, sugar-beet and ordinary cereals on the fenland.

Originally, Bury was a chapelry of Wistow but by 1178 it became the parish with the village of "Wistow" as its chapelry. (However, Wistow regained its separate identity by 1351). Bury also gained Upwood, and Little Raveley until a separate ecclesiastical parish was formed in 1746. Bury also gained part of Ramsey parish in the 16th century at the Dissolution.

Hepmangrove seems originally to have been connected with the Ramsey parish, and the brook running through the village of Bury formed the boundary between it and Bury. From the deeds relating to the tenements and lands situated within its boundaries, before the Dissolution, it appears to have been a populous suburb of Ramsey. Both Bury and Hepmangrove lay within the banlieu.?

Bury and Hepmangrove now forms one village. They still retain several 17th-century half-timbered thatched or tiled cottages, some of which have been refaced with brick, but most of the houses are of brick with slate or tile roofs. The former ancient stone bridge of one arch which crossed the Brook was replaced in 1925 by a wider bridge. The north-west side of the bridge is in Hepmangrove, in which the greater part of the village lies. The former railway station of Ramsey was originally in Bury parish, but current boundaries have shrunk back.

== Government ==
The lowest tier of government is Bury parish council, currently consisting of nine councillors. The second tier of local government is Huntingdonshire District Council, a non-metropolitan district of Cambridgeshire. Bury is a part of the district ward of 'Warboys and Bury' and is represented on the district council by two councillors. For Bury the highest tier of local government is Cambridgeshire County Council. Bury is a part of the electoral division of 'Ramsey and Bury' and is represented on the county council by one councillor.

Bury was in the historic and administrative county of Huntingdonshire until 1965. From 1965, the village was part of the new administrative county of Huntingdon and Peterborough. Then in 1974, following the Local Government Act 1972, Bury became a part of the county of Cambridgeshire.

At Westminster, Bury is in the parliamentary constituency of North West Cambridgeshire.

== Demography ==
=== Population ===
In the period 1801 to 1901 the population of Bury was recorded every ten years by the UK census. During this time the population was in the range of 224 (the lowest was in 1801) and 414 (the highest was in 1851).

From 1901, a census was taken every ten years with the exception of 1941 (due to the Second World War).

Parish	1911	1921	1931	1951	1961	1971	1981	1991	2001	2011
Bury	379	300	303	2064	1165	1069	975	1710	1713	1838

All population census figures from report Historic Census figures Cambridgeshire to 2011 by Cambridgeshire Insight.

In 2011, the parish covered an area of 1,468 acres (594 hectares) and so the population density for Bury in 2011 was 801.3 persons per square mile (309.4 per square kilometre).

== Education ==
Bury School was founded in about 1845 on land in Bury High Street and built by the generosity of Lady Olivia Bernard Sparrow. An entry in the Hunts. Gazetteer (dated 1854) states: "Small mixed school in parish, supported by Lady O. B. Sparrow at whose expense the pretty little school house was built. Catherine McCrobie is the mistress".

In 1970 it was rebuilt with two classrooms, a hall, offices and a kitchen facilities on its present site in Owls End, following a successful lobby against its proposed closure in 1966 due to low pupil numbers.

The school opened its new doors on 5 January 1971 and had 69 pupils on roll. Almost immediately a third classroom was needed as pupil numbers rose in line with a general local trend and in the following years two further mobile classrooms were added.

During the early 1990s it again outgrew its accommodation and an extensive building program commenced in September 1992. This was completed during the following Summer and the new extension, providing a second larger hall, two further classrooms, office and an updated kitchen, was dedicated by The Bishop of Huntingdon on the 18 October 1993.

During the academic year 2003–2004 a further extension took place, with a two classroom extension, new office and extensive work outside completed.

The school now has a roll of around 210 pupils, and is a Church of England Voluntary Assisted school. In 2013 it converted at an Academy as the inaugural member of the Diocese of Ely Multi Academy Trust (DEMAT).

== Religious sites ==
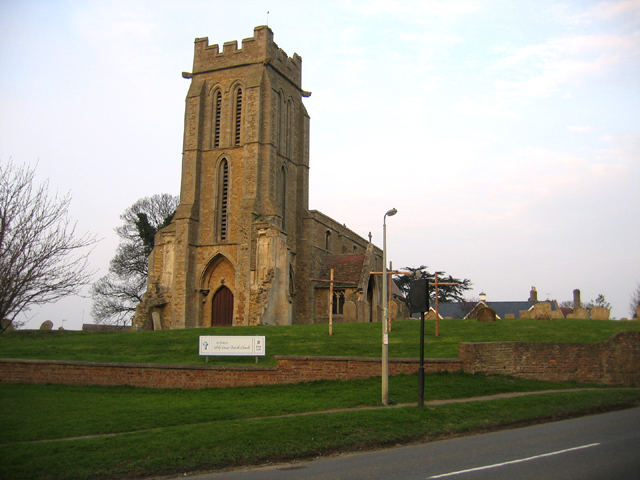
Holy Cross parish church

The church of Holy Cross is built of rubble with Barnack stone dressings and the roofs are covered with slates and tiles. It consists of a chancel (27 ft. by 14½ ft.), nave (48 ft. by 19½ ft.), a north aisle (7½ ft. wide), west tower (11 ft. by 10 ft.), and formerly a western chapel (about 35 ft. by 21½ ft.)

An early 12th-century church which stood here probably consisted only of a chancel and nave; the east and west walls of the nave of this church survive. Early in the 13th century the north aisle with its nave arcade was added and in the middle of the same century the western tower was built. Possibly owing to defects in the foundations, the north wall of the north aisle was rebuilt in the 14th century. About 1400, considerable alterations were again made, the chancel and south wall of the nave were rebuilt and new windows inserted in the north aisle. Towards the end of the 15th century, the large chapel west of the tower was built, possibly as a Lady Chapel. The chancel was shortened by about 13 ft., probably in the 16th century, as may be seen by the remains of two windows at the eastern angles of the church. The porch was built and the church restored in 1889.

The chancel has a modern east window of three lights. There is a re-set piscina on the south side of the window and in the north wall are two lockers, one over the other. The eastern window on the south side is of the 15th century, of two cinquefoiled lights under a quatrefoiled spandrel in a four-centred head. The western window on this side and that opposite to it are of the date of the rebuilding of about 1400. They are each of one cinquefoiled light which has been carried down below a transom to form a low-side window. In both cases the low-side window retains its shutter, but on the north side this has been plastered internally. The window on the north side has some glass contemporary with the rebuilding of about 1400 which consists of quarries and a border of crowns. Between the windows on the south side is a 15th-century doorway with a four-centred head. The chancel arch belongs to the early 12th-century church. It is semi-circular, of two bold moulded orders springing from half-round shafts with richly carved capitals and moulded bases. The 15th-century rood screen is of five bays. The open panels above have trefoiled ogee heads and the close panels below have cinquefoiled heads with carved foliated spandrels. The screen was formerly in a dilapidated condition and was repaired by the Rev. A. R. Pain with his own hands, after he was appointed to the living in 1845.

The north arcade of three bays is a good specimen of early 13th-century work. It has two-centred arches springing from octagonal piers with stiff-leaved capitals and moulded bases. The present windows were inserted in the south wall in the 15th century. The mid-13th-century arch of the south doorway was reset from the old wall. Beside it is a stoup which was found in rebuilding the bridge over the brook in the village in 1925. The clearstory, with its three windows on each side, was apparently added about 1400 when the south wall was built. The west doorway with the walls on either side also formed a part of the early 12th-century church. The arch is of three orders, the two outer of which have roll mouldings resting on jamb shafts with moulded bases and carved capitals. The doorway has a tympanum formed of square stones set diamondwise. The early 14th-century lectern at the east end of the nave is a rare example of its kind. It is of oak, carved in the front with five trefoiled arches, at one side with a trefoiled ogee-headed opening and on the other with oak leaves. The desk has a design of foliage. The pulpit is modern. There is a considerable number of plain oak seats of early 16th-century date. There is an early 17th-century oak chest in the church.

The windows in the north aisle are all a part of the rebuilding of about 1400. Each has two cinquefoiled lights in a square head and each contains some original glass. The north doorway is of a little earlier date and belongs to the rebuilding of the north wall in the 14th century. Remains of the old roof appear below the plaster. At the west end of the aisle is the font dating from about 1200. The bowl was originally square, but the angles have been cut off to form an octagon. It stands on a drum pedestal resting on a square base.

The west tower is of curious construction. It is of three stages with an embattled parapet with large gargoyles at three of the angles. On the north, south and west sides of the ground stage are two-centred arches, springing from corbels, which were originally open. On the east side is the west doorway of the nave. The western arch became the entrance to the west chapel, but it and the openings on the north and south have been blocked in modern times. The second stage has on each face except the east a long lancet window, and the bell chamber, which has a stone roof, has two lancet windows on each face.

All that now remains of the late 15th-century west chapel is its east end, which is built of ashlar faced stone. On each side of the archway into the tower is a 15th-century niche with a mutilated tabernacle over it. The remains of a window may be seen at the eastern end of both the north and south walls.

There are monuments in nave to Elizabeth West (died 1842), Thomas Whiston M.A. who succeeded his father in the curacy of this parish in 1793 (died 1803); Isaac Slack who served in the 2nd Batt. Royal Rifles and was killed in the Boer War 1899–1902; and on the east wall a marble slab with the names of thirteen parishioners who were killed in the Great War. There are three bells. The first bears the inscription 'C and G. Mears founders London 1853.' The second is a 14th-century bell with inscription 'Ave Maria,' probably by John and William Rofford, and the third bears the inscription 'Charles Newman made mee 1700. W. Baker T. Robinson.'

The churchyard, formerly used as the burial place for the parishes of Wistow, Upwood and Little Raveley, has been lately enlarged. As late as 1877 the portion at the south-east corner, in which the bodies from Little Raveley were buried, was still fenced off from the rest of the churchyard by a hedge.

In 1086 there was a church at Wistow which probably served its berewicks of Bury and Little Raveley. As, however, the town of Ramsey grew in the 12th century, the inconvenience of a parish altar in the monastic church led, we may suppose, to the building of a chapel subordinate to Wistow at Bury and near to the town of Ramsey. This chapel, which is described as "situated next the monastery where your (the abbot's) servants hear divine service", was confirmed to the abbot of Ramsey by papal bull dated 26 April 1139. From architectural evidence this confirmation was made probably very shortly after the church was built. Before 1178 Bury had become the parish church with Wistow and Little Raveley as its chapelries. By 1199 the chapel of Upwood had been attached to Bury. All parishioners of Bury and its chapelries were buried in Bury churchyard and the church of Bury took the great tithes. Wistow, however, was granted rights of burial in 1351 when it became a rectory.

Bury being within the banlieu of Ramsey, where the abbots had episcopal rights, the abbots, as patrons, collated to the church without presentation to the bishop. After the Dissolution, the advowson followed the descent of the manor; the lords of the manor claimed the church as a donative and the incumbents were described as curates. In 1868 the lord of the manor relinquished the right to a donative but retained the patronage, thus making the living a rectory. The Duke of Manchester is the present patron. In Bacon's Liber Regis (1534–5) there is reference to the church of St Mary of Hepmangrove, and a tradition exists that there was formerly a church there. In the Valor Ecclesiasticus (1535) the chapel of the Blessed Mary of Redybone is mentioned (iv, 272), and in 1538 we have references to the churchyard of Our Lady of Bury and Our Lady's Gild at Redebourn, and also the churchyard of St Mary of Bury . The church of Bury being dedicated to the Holy Cross, it may, perhaps, be suggested that the churchyard, chapel and gild of Our Lady relate to the chapel at the west end of Bury church, built possibly to serve the inhabitants of Hepmangrove, and that Redebourn may be an alternative name for Hepmangrove.

== Manor ==
At the time of our earliest evidence relating to Bury, it was a berewick or out-lying district probably with a separate organisation, attached to Wistow or Kingston and formed part of the grant by Oswald, Archbishop of York to Ramsey Abbey, about 974.

Some time before 1178, when Pope Alexander granted a confirmation to Ramsey Abbey, Bury had become the head of this holding, and Wistow and Raveley were berewicks to it. Shortly after this date, at all events before 1252, Bury, Wistow and Raveley had become separate manors. Bury and Hepmangrove, under the name of Bury cum Hepmangrove, appear to have been united for certain purposes before the dissolution of Ramsey.

After the Dissolution, however, they were granted on 4 March 1539–40, as separate manors, to Richard Williams (alias Cromwell) and followed the descent of Ramsey until 1662, when Henry Williams and Anne his wife granted the manor of Bury cum Hepmangrove to John Bambridge. In 1675 the manor was apparently settled by William Maynard and Mary his wife, Nicholas Buckeridge and Sarah his wife and Simon Dyott and Jane his wife, and in the following year the same parties conveyed it to Sir John Bernard, bart., of Brampton. In the latter conveyance there is a warranty by the three ladies and their heirs who may have been the coheirs of Bambridge. From the date of the sale to Sir John Bernard the manor has passed with that of the Bernards' seat at Brampton Park. The Duke of Manchester is the present owner.

The earliest reference to Hepmangrove is in the statutes of Abbot Aldwin (1091–1102) under which the profits from the manor were assigned to the cellarer of Ramsey Abbey for finding and mending the utensils of the refectory, bakehouse and brewhouse. From a survey of the time of Henry I, three tenants each rendered one or two bolls of honey. During the 13th and 14th centuries, much of the land in Hepmangrove was granted for religious purposes. In 1352 Philip de Clarvaux gave lands, the profits of which were to be expended in prayers for his own soul, and those of Emma his wife and his ancestors. In 1307 John de Lincoln, parson of the church of Cranfield, and others, granted lands there and in Ramsey and Bury for finding tapers to burn before the tomb of St Ivo of Ramsey in the Abbey church. Other lands were given by Henry Malpas in 1396 for the maintenance of the Lady Chapel in the Abbey church, then newly built. We have an instance here of a family arrangement, not perhaps infrequent in the 14th century. In 1362 William de Morton conveyed lands in Hepmangrove formerly belonging to Richard de Morton, possibly his father, to Thomas de Caunville and Fina his wife. Thomas dealt with the property in 1372–5, and in 1389 conveyed his lands to John his son and Alice his wife, and their children. By this deed provision was made that Thomas should have the best chamber in their house at Hepmangrove, and should board and have an allowance of 20s. a year, which allowance was to be increased to 40s. should he not approve of the board provided for him.

The manor remained with Ramsey Abbey till the Dissolution, when it was granted with Ramsey and Bury on 4 March 1539–40 to Richard Williams (alias Cromwell) and then has followed the descent of the manor of Bury.

== Sports and Bury Fen ==
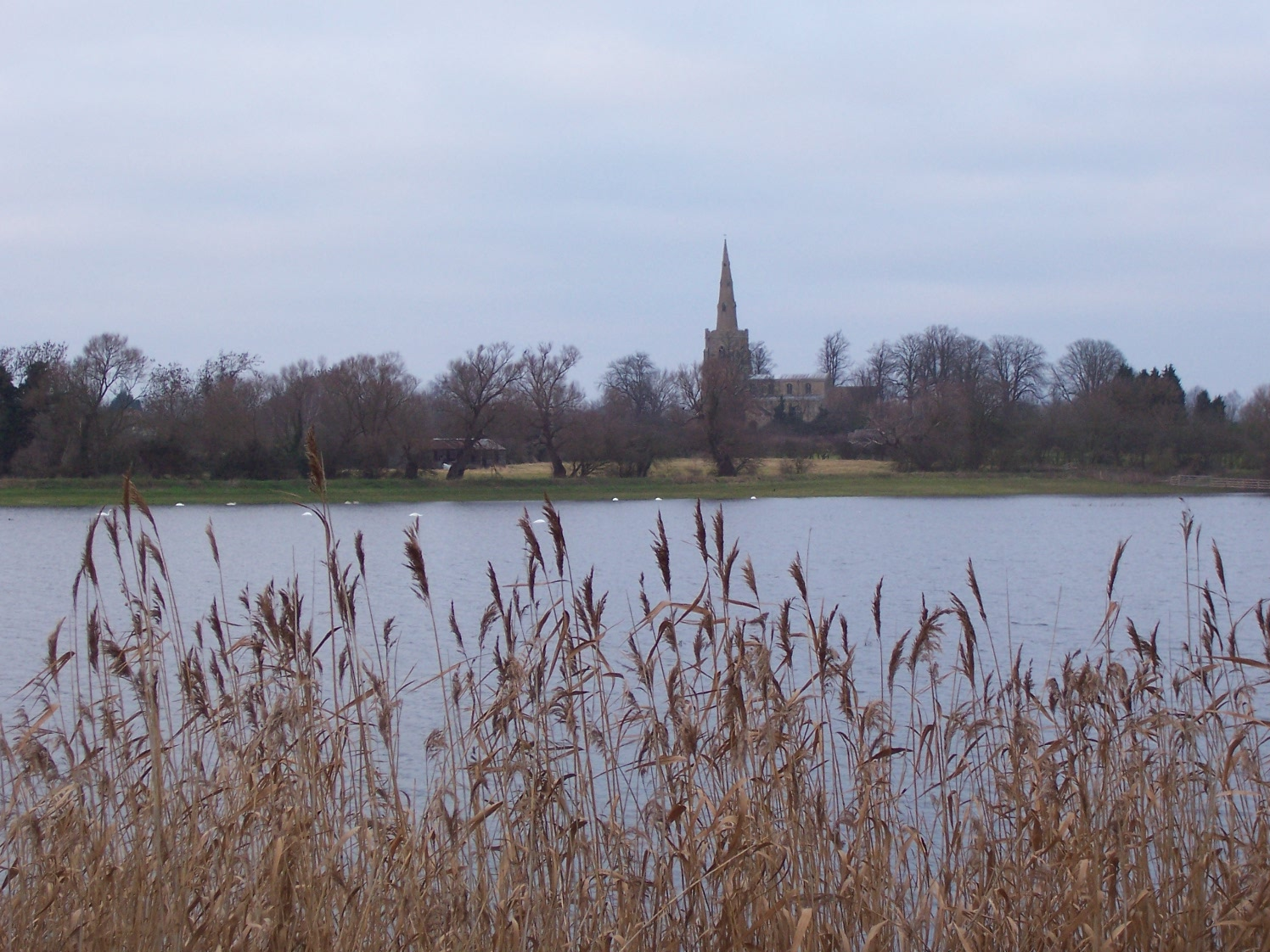
Bury Fen

Bury Fen is located just a few miles outside of St Ives, between Bluntisham and Earith, and is the birthplace of bandy, now an IOC accepted sport. According to documents from 1813 Bury Fen Bandy Club was undefeated for 100 years. A member of the club, Charles Goodman Tebbutt, wrote down the first official rules in 1882 (the modern rules are mostly English, with Russian elements) . He was also contributing a lot to spreading the sport to many countries.

Great Britain Bandy Association is based in Bury and there are now plans for activity on the ice in England again, to begin with in the form of rink bandy.
