= Abbots Ripton =

Village in Cambridgeshire, England

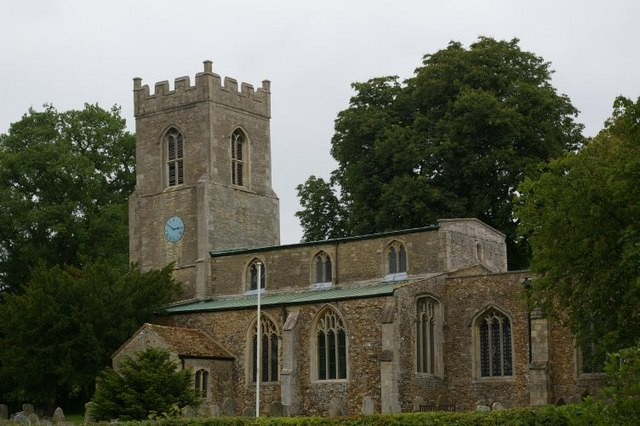
- St Andrew's church

- Location within Cambridgeshire
- Population: 305 (2011 Census)
- OS grid reference: TL231780
- Civil parish: Abbots Ripton
- District: Huntingdonshire
- Shire county: Cambridgeshire
- Region: East
- Country: England
- Sovereign state: United Kingdom
- Post town: HUNTINGDON
- Postcode district: PE28
- Dialling code: 01487
- Police: Cambridgeshire
- Fire: Cambridgeshire
- Ambulance: East of England
- UK Parliament: North West Cambridgeshire

Abbots Ripton is a village and civil parish in Cambridgeshire, England. Abbots Ripton is situated within Huntingdonshire which is a non-metropolitan district of Cambridgeshire as well as being an historic county of England. Abbots Ripton lies approximately 4 miles (6 km) north of Huntingdon on the B1090.

The parish occupied some 4,191 acres (1,696 ha) of land in 1801, which had reduced to 4,080 acres (1,651 ha) by 2011. The parish of Abbots Ripton is home to 305 residents (2011 census). The village is also notable as the location of the Abbots Ripton railway disaster in 1876 in which a Flying Scotsman train was wrecked during a blizzard. The disaster led to important safety improvements in railway signalling.

The civil parish includes the nearby hamlet of Wennington, which lies one mile north of Abbots Ripton. Wennington has a population of about 60 people.

== History ==
Abbots Ripton was listed in the Domesday Book of 1086 in the Hundred of Hurstingstone in Huntingdonshire; the name of the settlement was written as Riptune. In 1086 there was just one manor at Abbots Ripton; the annual rent paid to the lord of the manor in 1066 had been £8 and the rent was the same in 1086. The survey records that there were 14 ploughlands at Abbots Ripton in 1086 and that there was the capacity for a further two. In addition to the arable land, there was 16 acres (6 hectares) of meadows and 3,784 acres (1,531 hectares) of woodland at Abbots Ripton. By 1086 there was already a church and a priest at Abbots Ripton.

In 1870–72, John Marius Wilson described Abbots Ripton as follows:

RIPTON-ABBOTS, a parish, with a village, and with Wennington hamlet, in the district and county of Huntingdon; near the Great Northern railway, 4 miles N of Huntingdon. Post-town, Huntingdon. Acres, 3,956. Real property, £4,680. Pop., 381. Houses, 73. The property is divided among a few. The manor belonged to Ramsey abbey, passed to the St. Johns, and belongs now to E. Fellows and B. Rooper, Esqs. R. Hall is the seat of Mr. Rooper. The living is a rectory in the diocese of Ely. Value, £630.* Patron, the Rev. P. P. Rooper. The church is ancient, and was restored in 1858. There is a national school.

— Imperial Gazetteer of England and Wales

Abbots Ripton was the location for a small Royal Observer Corps Bunker, it was located near to RAF Alconbury. It closed in 1968 and was demolished.

== The origins and history of the name ==
Abbots Ripton ends in ton which usually indicates a Saxon origin. The origin of the place-name is from the Old English words rip (a strip of land) and tun (homestead or farm). Its name has appeared in various guises throughout its history; it was recorded as Riptone in the 10th century and Riptune in 1086. It was during the 12th and 13th century that the Abbot part came into the name; it was then owned by the Abbot of Ramsey, and it was most probably just to distinguish it from Kings Ripton which was under royal ownership. During this period it was also known by the names of Magna Riptona, Ryptone and finally Riptone Abbatis. After the Reformation the crown sold it to the St John family and for a time it was called St John's Ripton before it became known by the name we know it today.

== Government ==
For Abbots Ripton the highest tier of local government is Cambridgeshire County Council. Abbots Ripton is a part of the electoral division of Upwood and The Raveleys and is represented on the county council by one councillor. The second tier of local government is Huntingdonshire District Council, a non-metropolitan district of Cambridgeshire. Abbots Ripton is a part of the district ward of Upwood and The Raveleys and is represented on the district council by one councillor. As a civil parish, Abbots Ripton has a parish council. which consists of six members.

Abbots Ripton was in the historic and administrative county of Huntingdonshire until 1965. From 1965, the village was part of the new administrative county of Huntingdon and Peterborough. Then in 1974, following the Local Government Act 1972, Abbots Ripton became a part of the county of Cambridgeshire.

At Westminster, Abbots Ripton is in the parliamentary constituency of North West Cambridgeshire, and has been represented in the House of Commons since 2005 by Shailesh Vara (Conservative).

== Geography ==
The village of Abbots Ripton lies on the B1090, a minor road that runs from St Ives to the south-east to a junction with the B1043, north-west of the parish, close to the A1(M) motorway and just south of Sawtry.

Abbots Ripton is situated 4 miles (6 km) north of Huntingdon, 17 miles (27 km) north-west of Cambridge and 60 miles (97 km) north of London. In 1801 the parish covered an area of 4,191 acres (1,696 ha), but by 2011 this had been reduced to 4,080 acres (1,651 ha).

The village lies at around 29 metres (95 ft) above sea level; the parish as a whole is almost flat, lying between 25 metres (82 ft) and 45 metres (148 ft) above sea level, with the lowest area in the south-east of the parish. Around 2 miles (3 km) north of the parish the land slopes down close to sea-level and The Fens start.

The northern half of the parish contains a number of wooded areas, including Wennington Wood, Holland Wood, and Hill Wood. The land in the rest of the parish is used for arable farming, mainly wheat, barley and beans.

The East Coast Main Line that runs from London to Edinburgh forms part of the western boundary of the parish and then crosses the parish to the north. The village of Abbots Ripton lies 0.5 miles (0.8 km) to the east of the railway.

=== Geology ===
In common with much of south-east England, the parish lies on a bedrock of Oxford Clay Formation mudstone which is a blue-grey or olive coloured clay that was formed between 156 and 165 million years ago in the Jurassic Period.

Above this bedrock are superficial deposits characterised as Oadby Member Diamicton, that has formed within the last two million years during Ice Age conditions by glaciers scouring the land. Close to the streams the superficial deposits are of loose soil or sediments called alluvium that have formed during the last 12,000 years. To the north-east of Wennington, there are sand and gravel deposits formed by glacio-fluvial processes in the mid-Pleistocene period.

The soil is classified as lime-rich loamy and clayey, which has impeded drainage and is high in natural fertility; it is suitable primarily for arable farming with some grassland. In 1891 a bore hole was made at Abbots Ripton Hall (52.384°N 0.180°W) and drilled to a depth of 209 feet (64 m) showing that there was 7 feet (2.1 m) of clay, loam and gravel on top of 153 feet (47 m) of Oxford Clay.

== Demography ==
=== Population ===
In the period 1801 to 1901 the population of Abbots Ripton was recorded every ten years by the UK census. During this time the population was in the range of 326 (the lowest in 1811) and 408 (the highest in 1871).

From 1901, a census was taken every ten years with the exception of 1941 (due to the Second World War).

| Parish | 1911 | 1921 | 1931 | 1951 | 1961 | 1971 | 1981 | 1991 | 2001 | 2011 |
|---|---|---|---|---|---|---|---|---|---|---|
| Abbots Ripton | 379 | 354 | 343 | 357 | 370 | 283 | 246 | 251 | 309 | 305 |

All population census figures from report Historic Census figures Cambridgeshire to 2011 by Cambridgeshire Insight.

In 2011, the parish covered an area of 4,080 acres (1,651 hectares) and so the population density for Abbots Ripton in 2011 was 47. 9 persons per square mile (18. 5 per square kilometre).

== Education ==
There is a Church of England primary school in Abbots Ripton for children between the ages of four and eleven years old. The school building was designed by Peter Foster who was the Surveyor of Westminster Abbey. The Ofsted report from June 2015 gave the school an overall effectiveness rating of Good. The school has places for 120 pupils but in 2015 there were only 91 pupils on the school roll.

== Religious sites ==
The village's parish church is dedicated to St Andrew and is a Grade I listed building. The church consists of a chancel, north chapel, nave, north aisle, south aisle, west tower and south porch. There was a church here in 1086, but there is no evidence of it in the present building which was built in the early part of the 13th century. It was dedicated by the Bishop of Lincoln in 1242.

The chancel was rebuilt at the start of the 16th century, a north chapel was added and the present tower was constructed. The tower houses three bells, the oldest dating from around 1400 and there is a clock on the south face of the second stage of the tower; the clock was given in remembrance of Rev Plumer Pott Rooper by his brothers and sisters. Restoration of the church took place in the second half of the 19th century.

== Landmarks ==
=== Abbots Ripton Hall ===
The village is home to the 18th century Abbots Ripton Hall which now has an estate totalling 5,700 acres (2,307 ha), larger than Abbots Ripton itself. Abbots Ripton Hall is a Grade II listed building that was built on the site of the old manor house. During World War II, Abbots Ripton Hall was used as a hospital.

The gardens and parkland cover 8 acres (3 hectares) and there is an ornamental lake of 10 acres (4 hectares). The grounds are home to some tree species and populations that are considered relatively uncommon in England. This includes a good collection of elm trees, which are injected every year to prevent the Dutch elm disease.

Abbots Ripton Hall belonged in the 1800s to the Rooper family. John Bonfoy Rooper was MP for Huntingdonshire from 1831 to 1837 and High Sheriff of Cambridgeshire and Huntingdonshire. It is now the seat of John Fellowes, 4th Lord De Ramsey.

=== Scheduled Monuments ===
There is a bowl barrow about 1 mile (2 km) south-east of the village which is a scheduled ancient monument. The one at Abbots Ripton is 19 metres (21 yd) in diameter, 1–1.5 m high with signs of a ditch 4 m wide to the north and west. According to the English Heritage Listing, it is exceptionally well preserved and it has not been excavated.

There is a moated site in a small wood at Bellamy's Grove, 1 mile (2 km) south of Abbot's Ripton. The moat island is between 90 metres (98 yd) and 100 metres (109 yd) east to west, and between 70 metres (77 yd) and 90 metres (98 yd) north to south. Some signs still remain of the inner and outer banks of the moat. Within the island itself are two small rectangular fishponds. The date when the moated island was constructed is not known, but it may well have been around the 12th century, when the inclusion of fishponds within a moated island was at its most popular. According to the English Heritage Listing, the moated site at Bellamy's Grove is one of the best preserved of its kind in the region.

== Transport ==
Station Road marks the location of the former railway station on the East Coast Main Line. It operated from 1885-1958 when it was closed as part of the 'Beeching' cuts.

== Culture and community ==
The village hall was also designed by Peter Foster, Surveyor of Westminster Abbey; it was built in 1988 and opened by John Major. Abbots Ripton has a shop, garage, and a post office.

In 2010 the only Public House in the village, The Three Horseshoes, was severely damaged by a fire. The Grade II Listed 17th century building was re-built and re-opened as the Abbot's Elm in 2012.

Since its inception in 2004, the Secret Garden Party summer music festival has been held annually at a rural location near the village.
