= Huntingdonshire =

Historic county and district of Cambridgeshire, England

Coordinates: 52°25′N 0°15′W

- Non-metropolitan district
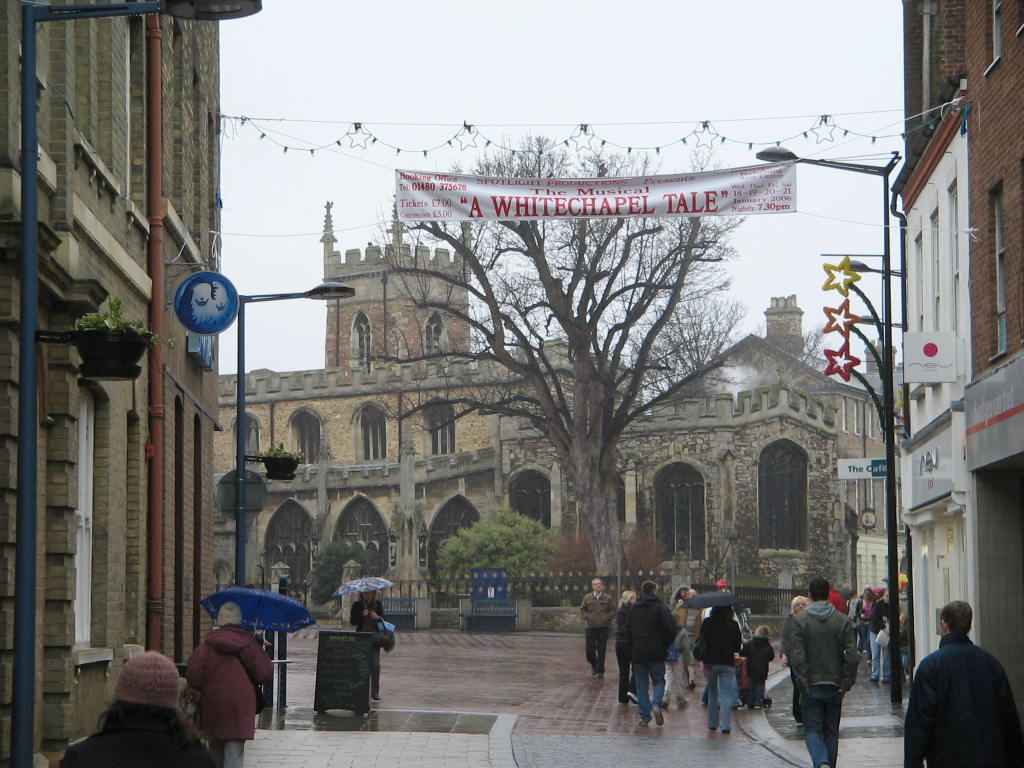
- Huntingdon, the historic county town of Huntingdonshire

- Huntingdonshire shown within Cambridgeshire
- Sovereign state: United Kingdom
- Country: England
- Region: East of England
- Non-metropolitan county: Cambridgeshire
- Status: Non-metropolitan district
- Admin HQ: Huntingdon
- Incorporated: 1 April 1974

Government
  - Type: Non-metropolitan district council
  - Body: Huntingdonshire District Council
  - Leadership: Leader & Cabinet
  - MPs: Ben Obese-Jecty; Sam Carling

Area
  - Total: 352.3 sq mi (912.5 km^{2})
  - Rank: 34th (of 296)

Population (2025)
  - Total: 191,941
  - Rank: 109th (of 296)
  - Density: 544.8/sq mi (210.3/km^{2})

Ethnicity (2021)
  - Ethnic groups: List: 92.4% White; 3.2% Asian; 2.2% Mixed; 1.5% Black; 0.7% other

Religion (2021)
  - Religion: List: 47.3% Christianity; 43.8% no religion; 7.5% other; 1.4% Islam
- Time zone: UTC0 (GMT)
  - Summer (DST): UTC+1 (BST)
- ONS code: 12UE (ONS); E07000011 (GSS)
- OS grid reference: TL1900381334
- Website: huntingdonshire.gov.uk

Huntingdonshire (/ˈhʌntɪŋdənʃər, -ʃɪər/; abbreviated Hunts) is a local government district in Cambridgeshire, England. The district had a population of 180,800 at the 2021 census, and has an area of 354.3 square miles (918 km^{2}). The largest towns are St Neots (33,410), Huntingdon (25,428), and St Ives (16,815). The district council is based in Huntingdon.

Historically a county in its own right, Huntingdonshire's boundaries were established in the Anglo-Saxon era. Huntingdonshire became an administrative county in 1889. In 1965, it was merged with the Soke of Peterborough to form Huntingdon and Peterborough, which was in turn merged with Cambridgeshire and Isle of Ely in 1974 to form Cambridgeshire, of which Huntingdonshire is now a district.

== History ==
The area corresponding to modern Huntingdonshire was first delimited in Anglo-Saxon times. Its boundaries have remained largely unchanged since the 10th century, although it lost its administrative function in 1965. On his accession in 1154 Henry II declared all Huntingdonshire a forest.

=== Status ===
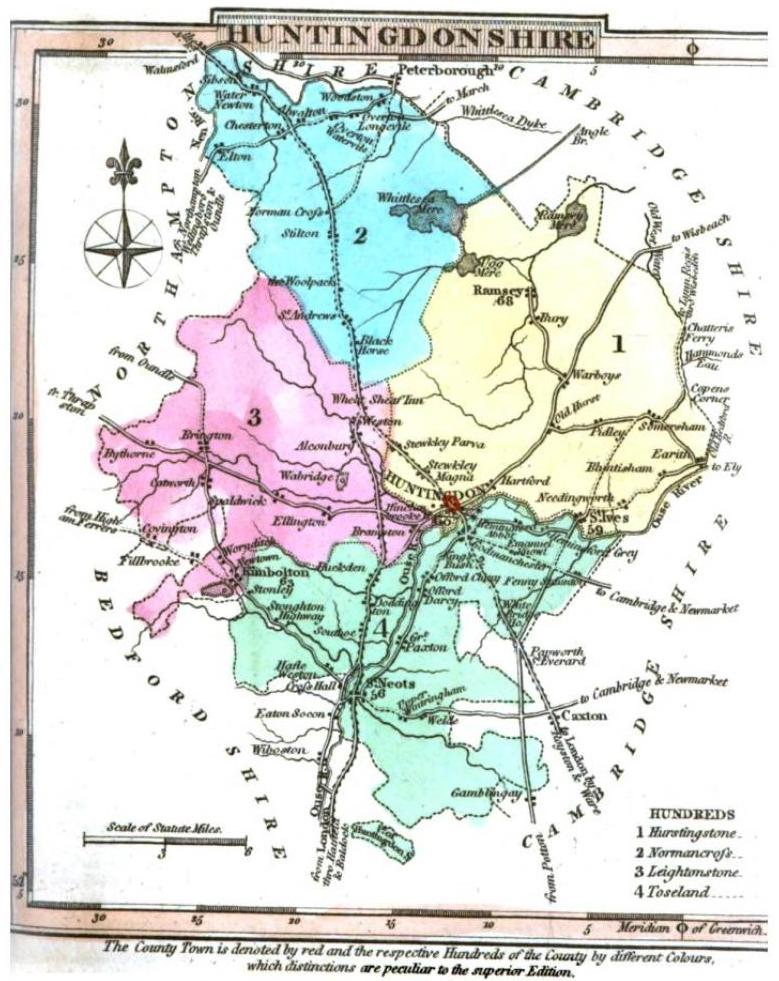
Map of Huntingdonshire, 1824

In 1889, under the Local Government Act 1888 Huntingdonshire became an administrative county, with the newly-formed Huntingdonshire County Council taking over administrative functions from the Quarter Sessions. The area in the north of the county forming part of the municipal borough of Peterborough became instead part of the Soke of Peterborough, an administrative county in Northamptonshire. In 1965, under a recommendation of the Local Government Commission for England, Huntingdonshire was merged with the Soke of Peterborough to form Huntingdon and Peterborough. The Lieutenancy county was also merged. At the same time, St Neots was expanded westwards over the river into Eaton Ford and Eaton Socon in Bedfordshire.

In 1974, under the Local Government Act 1972, Huntingdon and Peterborough merged with Cambridgeshire and Isle of Ely to form the new non-metropolitan county of Cambridgeshire. A Huntingdon district was created based closely on the former administrative county borders, with the exclusion of the Old Fletton Urban District, which became part of the Peterborough district, as did the part of Norman Cross Rural District in Peterborough New Town. The district was renamed Huntingdonshire on 1 October 1984 by a resolution of the district council.

Original historical documents relating to Huntingdonshire are held by Cambridgeshire Archives and Local Studies at the County Record Office in Huntingdon.

=== Proposed revival of administrative county ===
The Local Government Boundary Commission for England (1992) considered in the 1990s the case for making a Huntingdonshire unitary authority as part of a general structural review of English local government that led to unitary authorities in two other English counties that had been abolished: Rutland and Herefordshire.

The draft recommendations envisaged three possible scenarios for structural change in Cambridgeshire: the preferred option and the third option had a unitary Huntingdonshire, whilst the second option would have seen Huntingdonshire combine with Peterborough and Fenland to form a "Peterborough and Huntingdonshire" unitary authority. The Final recommendations of the commission for Cambridgeshire recommended no change in the status quo in Cambridgeshire. The districts of Peterborough and Huntingdonshire were referred back to the commission for reconsideration in 1995. The commission recommended the creation of a Peterborough unitary authority, but proposed that Huntingdonshire remain part of the shire county of Cambridgeshire, noting that "there was no exceptional county allegiance to Huntingdonshire, as had been perceived in Rutland and Herefordshire."

David McKie writing in The Guardian in October 1994 noted that "Writers-in demanded an independent Huntingdon; but MORI's more broadly based poll showed that most Huntingdonians – that is, most of [Prime Minister] John Major's electors – were content to stay part of Cambridgeshire."

Ahead of the government's simplification of local government to only unitary authorities, Huntingdonshire District Council has been developing a business case for reviving Huntingdonshire as a standalone unitary authority.

=== Awareness promotion ===
The flag designed to represent Huntingdonshire, registered with the Flag Institute in 2009

After the failure to revive the unitary authority, a Huntingdonshire Society was set up to promote awareness of Huntingdonshire as a historic county and campaign for its reinstatement as an administrative and ceremonial entity. In 2002 it established an annual "Huntingdonshire Day" on 25 April, the birthday of Oliver Cromwell. After a campaign by the Huntingdonshire Society, the county flag of Huntingdonshire, a gold and beribboned hunting horn on a green field, was registered by the Flag Institute in June 2009.

== Governance ==
Huntingdonshire District Council's headquarters are located in Pathfinder House in Huntingdon. The council consists of 52 councillors. Until 2018, district council elections were held in three out of every four years, with a third of the 52 council seats coming up each time. Elections since have been held for all seats every four years. The Conservative party had a majority on the council from 1976 until 2022, after which a joint administration took control of the council.

== Sports ==
Huntingdonshire is the birthplace of bandy, now an IOC accepted sport. According to documents from 1813, Bury Fen Bandy Club was undefeated for 100 years. A club member, Charles Tebbutt, wrote the first official rules in 1882 and helped to spread the sport to other countries.

Huntingdonshire County Cricket Club is taken to be one of the 20 minor counties of English and Welsh cricket, but it has never played in the Minor Counties Championship. It has its own Cricket Board and played in the English domestic one-day competition from 1999 to 2003.The county played seven List A matches during this period, with the final List A match it played coming against Cheshire.

== Media ==
In terms of television, Huntingdonshire is served by BBC East and ITV Anglia broadcasting from Sandy Heath transmitting station.

Radio stations for the area are BBC Radio Cambridgeshire, Heart East, Greatest Hits Radio East, Star Radio and HCR FM, a community based station that broadcast from its studios in Huntingdon.

The Hunts Post is the local weekly newspaper.

== Towns and villages ==
Huntingdonshire population pyramid

=== Towns ===
- Godmanchester
- Huntingdon
- Kimbolton
- Ramsey
- St Ives
- St Neots

=== Hamlets and villages ===
- Abbots Ripton, Abbotsley, Alconbury, Alconbury Weston, Alwalton
- Barham, Bury, Bluntisham, Brampton, Brington, Broughton, Buckden, Buckworth, Bythorn
- Catworth, Chesterton, Colne, Connington, Coppingford, Covington
- Denton and Caldecote, Diddington
- Earith, Easton, Eaton Ford, Eaton Socon, Ellington, Elton, Eynesbury
- Farcet, Fenstanton, Folksworth and Washingley
- Glatton, Grafham, Great Gransden, Great, Little and Steeple Gidding, Great Paxton, Great Staughton
- Haddon, Hail Weston, Hamerton, Hartford, Hemingford Abbots, Hemingford Grey, Hilton, Holme, Holywell, Houghton
- Keyston, Kings Ripton
- Leighton Bromswold, Little Paxton
- Molesworth, Morborne
- Needingworth
- Oldhurst, Old Weston, Orton Longueville, Orton Waterville
- Perry, Pidley
- Ramsey St Mary's, Ramsey Forty Foot, Ramsey Mereside, Ramsey Heights
- Sawtry, Spaldwick, Somersham, Southhoe and Midloe, Stibbington, Stilton, Stow Longa
- Tetworth, Tilbrook, Toseland, The Offords, The Raveleys, The Stukeleys
- Upton, Upwood
- Wansford, Warboys, Waresley, Water Newton, Winwick, Wistow, Woodhurst, Woodwalton, Woolley, Wyton
- Yaxley, Yelling

== Parishes ==
The whole district is divided into civil parishes. The parish councils for Godmanchester, Huntingdon, Ramsey, St Ives and St Neots take the style "town council". Some of the smaller parishes have a parish meeting rather than a parish council.

=== Medieval parishes ===
Chapelries are listed in italics. Parishes are listed by the four Hundreds of Huntingdonshire.

| Hundred | Parishes |
|---|---|
| Hurstingstone | Abbots Ripton • Bluntisham (Earith • Earith Bridge) • Broughton • Bury • Great Raveley^{1} • Great Stukeley • Hartford • Holywell cum Needingworth • Houghton • Kings Ripton • Little Stukeley • Ramsey • Somersham (Colne • Pidley cum Fenton) • St Ives (Old Hurst • Woodhurst) • Warboys • Wistow (Little Raveley • Upwood) • Wyton |
| Leightonstone | Alconbury • Alconbury Weston^{1} • Brampton • Brington • Buckworth • Bythorn^{4} • Coppingford • Covington • Easton • Ellington • Grafham • Great Catworth • Great Gidding • Hamerton • Keyston • Kimbolton • Leighton Bromswold • Little Gidding • Molesworth • Old Weston • Spaldwick • Steeple Gidding • Stow Longa (Barham) • Swineshead^{2} • Thurning^{3} • Upton • Woolley |
| Norman Cross | Alwalton • Botolph Bridge • Caldecote • Chesterton • Conington • Denton • Elton • Fletton • Folksworth • Glatton (Holme) • Haddon • Morborne • Orton Longueville • Orton Waterville • Sawtry All Saints • Sawtry Judith • Sawtry St Andrew • Sibson-cum-Stibbington • Stanground (Farcet) • Stilton • Washingley • Water Newton • Woodston • Woodwalton • Yaxley |
| Toseland | Abbotsley • Buckden • Diddington • Eynesbury • Fenstanton (Hilton) • Godmanchester • Great Gransden • Great Paxton (Little Paxton • Toseland) • Great Staughton • Hemingford Abbots • Hemingford Grey • Offord Cluny • Offord D'Arcy • Southoe (Hail Weston) • St Neots • Waresley • Yelling |
| not in a hundred | Huntingdon All Saints • Huntingdon Holy Trinity • Huntingdon St Andrew • Huntingdon St Benedict • Huntingdon St Botolph • Huntingdon St Clement • Huntingdon St Edmund • Huntingdon St George • Huntingdon St Germain • Huntingdon St John the Baptist • Huntingdon St Lawrence • Huntingdon St Martin • Huntingdon St Mary • Huntingdon St Michael • Huntingdon St Nicholas • Huntingdon St Peter |

^{1}no record of a church having ever existed; ^{2}now in Bedfordshire; ^{3}now in Northamptonshire; ^{4}a chapelry to Broughton in Hurstingstone hundred

== Notable people ==
In order of birth:

- Henry of Saltrey, a Huntingdonshire Cistercian monk, wrote Tractatus de Purgatorio Sancti Patricii (Treatise on the Purgatory of St Patrick) in about 1180–1184.
- Sir William Papworth (1331–1414) of Grafham and Papworth St. Agnes was a member of five 14th-century parliaments.
- Catherine of Aragon (1485–1536), previously Queen of England, died in confinement at Kimbolton Castle.
- Henry Brandon, 2nd Duke of Suffolk and his brother Charles Brandon, 3rd Duke of Suffolk, nephews of Henry VIII, died of sweating sickness at Buckden Towers within an hour of each other on 14 July 1551.
- Nicholas Ferrar (1592–1637), scholar, courtier and cleric, spent the last eleven years of his life at the Little Gidding community, inspiration of the fourth poem in T. S. Eliot's Four Quartets.
- Philip Nye (1595–1672), Independent theologian, became the incumbent of Kimbolton and an adviser to Cromwell.
- Oliver Cromwell (1599–1658), Lord Protector of England, Scotland and Ireland 1653–1658, was educated at Huntingdon Grammar School.
- Richard Astry (c. 1632–1714) was an English antiquary.
- Samuel Pepys (1633–1703), Member of Parliament (MP) and diarist, attended Huntingdon Grammar School.
- William Sparrow (1641–1729), cut the famous turf maze at Hilton in 1660.
- Alice and Thomas Curwen were active in the county as Quaker preachers in 1677–1678.
- Ann Jebb (1735–1812), political reformer and radical writer, was born at Kings Ripton.
- William Henry Fellowes (1769–1837) of Ramsey Abbey, was a longstanding MP for Huntingdon and then Huntingdonshire.
- Olinthus Gregory (1774–1841), mathematician and editor, was born at Yaxley.
- Robert Fox (1798–1843), antiquary and local historian, was born and died at Godmanchester.
- Charles Bowen Cooke (1859–1920), locomotive engineer, was born at Orton Longueville.
- Henry Royce (1863–1933), pioneering car manufacturer and founder of Rolls-Royce Limited, was born in Alwalton.
- Lucy M. Boston (1892–1990), children's writer, lived in Huntingdonshire from 1937 until her death, and set the Green Knowe series there.
- Josef Jakobs (1898–1941), German spy captured in Ramsey Hollow, Huntingdonshire in 1941
- Michael Lawrence (born 1943), children's writer, is best known for the Jiggy McCue series.
- John Major (born 1943), politician and Prime Minister (1990–1997), was MP for Huntingdonshire from 1979 to 2001, and still resides in the county at Great Stukeley.
- John Butcher (1946–2006), Conservative MP and junior minister, was raised in Huntingdonshire and attended Huntingdon Grammar School.
- Terry Reid (born 1949), rock musician, grew up in Holywell.
- Chris Morris (born 1962), satirist known for the television series Brass Eye and The Day Today
- Jason Ablewhite (born 1972) former leader of Huntingdonshire District Council, former Cambridgeshire Police and Crime Commissioner

== Arms ==
Coat of arms of Huntingdonshire
| Notes Originally granted to Huntingdonshire County Council on 9 April 1937. Crest On a wreath of the Argent and Azure a lion rampant Gules gorged with a collar flory counter-flory Or and supporting a staff proper flying therefrom a banner Vert charged with a hunting horn stringed Or. Escutcheon Barry wavy Argent and Azure on a lozenge throughout Vert between in chief three garbs one and two and in base a cornucopia a fess embattled all Or. Motto Labore Omnia Florent (By Labour Everything Prospers) |

== See also ==
- Flag of Huntingdonshire
- List of English and Welsh endowed schools (19th century)#Huntingdonshire
- List of Lord Lieutenants of Huntingdonshire
- List of High Sheriffs of Huntingdonshire
- Custos Rotulorum of Huntingdonshire – Keepers of the Rolls
- Huntingdonshire (UK Parliament constituency) -Historical list of MPs for Huntingdonshire constituency
