= Kings Ripton =

Village in Cambridgeshire, England

Coordinates: 52.37°N 0.15°W

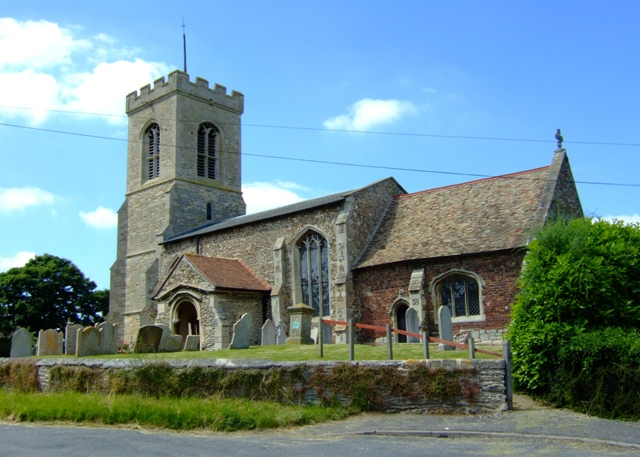
- St Peter's, Kings Ripton

- Location within Cambridgeshire
- Population: 222 (2011)
- OS grid reference: TL260765
- Civil parish: Kings Ripton
- District: Huntingdonshire
- Shire county: Cambridgeshire
- Region: East
- Country: England
- Sovereign state: United Kingdom
- Post town: HUNTINGDON
- Postcode district: PE28
- Dialling code: 01487
- Police: Cambridgeshire
- Fire: Cambridgeshire
- Ambulance: East of England
- UK Parliament: North West Cambridgeshire

Kings Ripton (traditionally King's Ripton) is a village and civil parish in Cambridgeshire, England. Kings Ripton lies approximately 3 miles (5 km) north-east of Huntingdon. Kings Ripton is situated within Huntingdonshire which is a non-metropolitan district of Cambridgeshire as well as being a historic county of England.

== History ==
Forming part of the parish of neighbouring Hartford at the time of the Domesday Book, in a suit of 1276 the king claimed the area as the demesne of the Crown and was known for a while as Ripton Regis, a hamlet of Hartford. The prefix "King's" is used to distinguish it from neighbouring Abbots Ripton, which was at one time owned by Ramsey Abbey. The manor is currently owned by Magdalene College, Cambridge.

The early Quaker leader James Nayler was buried on 21 October 1660 "in Thomas Parnell's burying-ground at King's Ripton." According to the village's website "There is also a Quakers Burial ground to the rear of 'Quakers Rest' on Ramsey Road."

== Government ==
As a civil parish, Kings Ripton has a parish council, composed of five councillors and has a parish clerk. The second tier of local government is Huntingdonshire District Council, a non-metropolitan district of Cambridgeshire. Kings Ripton is a part of the district ward of Upwood and The Raveleys and is represented on the district council by one councillor. For Kings Ripton the highest tier of local government is Cambridgeshire County Council. Kings Ripton is part of the electoral division of Warboys and Upwood and is represented on the county council by one councillor.

At Westminster Kings Ripton is in the parliamentary constituency of North West Cambridgeshire, where it is represented by Sam Carling (Labour).

== Demography ==
=== Population ===
In the period 1801 to 1901 the population of Kings Ripton was recorded every ten years by the UK census. During this time the population was in the range of 111 (the lowest was in 1901) and 284 (the highest was in 1861).

From 1901, a census was taken every ten years with the exception of 1941 (due to the Second World War).

Parish	1911	1921	1931	1951	1961	1971	1981	1991	2001	2011
Kings Ripton	112	122	117	127	129	127	139	148	168	222

All population census figures from report Historic Census figures Cambridgeshire to 2011 by Cambridgeshire Insight.

In 2011, the parish covered an area of 1,359 acres (550 hectares) and the population density of Kings Ripton in 2011 was 104.5 persons per square mile (40.4 per square kilometre).

== Church ==
The parish church of St Peter dates from the 13th century, with extensions over the following 300 years. There was a church on the site at the time of the Norman Conquest though no trace remains of the original building.

The ornamented square font dates from the 12th century.

== See also ==
- Abbots Ripton
