= A14 road (England) =

Major road in England

A14

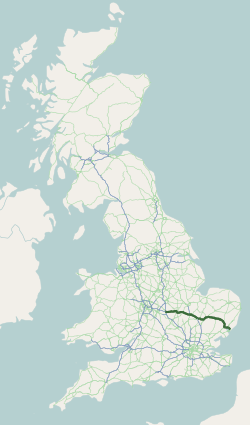

Route information
- Part of E24 and E30
- Maintained by National Highways
- Length: 127 mi (204 km)
- Existed: 1992–present

Major junctions
- Northwest end: Catthorpe
- / M1 motorway/M6 motorway / J13 → A45 road/A605 road J21 → A141 road J22 → A1 road / J31 → M11 motorway/A428 road J36 → A11 road J38 → A11 road J55 → A12 road
- Southeast end: Felixstowe

Location
- Country: United Kingdom
- Constituent country: England
- Counties: Leicestershire, Northamptonshire, Cambridgeshire, Suffolk
- Primary destinations: Coventry; Birmingham; Rugby; Kettering; Huntingdon; Cambridge; Newmarket; Bury St Edmunds; Stowmarket; Ipswich; Felixstowe

Road network
- Roads in the United Kingdom; Motorways; A and B road zones

The A14 is a major trunk road in England, running 127 miles (204 km) from the Catthorpe Interchange, a major intersection at the southern end of the M6 and junction 19 of the M1 in Leicestershire, to the port of Felixstowe, Suffolk. The road forms part of the unsigned Euroroutes E24 and E30. It is the busiest shipping lane in East Anglia carrying large amounts of cargo between the UK and mainland Europe.

== Route ==
Beginning at the Catthorpe Interchange, the A14 runs through Kettering, Northamptonshire, towards Huntingdon where it now runs parallel to the A1 past Brampton, Cambridgeshire and now bypasses Huntingdon completely due to the A14 Cambridge to Huntingdon Scheme from 2017 until 2022. It continues past Bar Hill towards Cambridge to meet the end of the M11 and the A428 at the Girton Interchange. The A14 continues easterly over northern Cambridge towards Newmarket where it briefly joins with the A11 to form the Newmarket Bypass between J36 and J38. The A11 splits off again towards the North and the A14 continues through Bury St Edmunds, past Stowmarket then on to bypass Ipswich via the Orwell Bridge and finally comes to an end at the Port of Felixstowe fully connecting the Midlands to East Anglia.

The road is a dual carriageway, mostly with two lanes each way, but there are some dual three-lane sections: on the Newmarket bypass (between Junctions 36 and 38) where it runs concurrent with the A11, at Kettering (between Junctions 7 and 9) and as of December 2019, with the opening of the Cambridge to Huntington improvement scheme, dual three-lanes between Milton and the A1 Junction at Brampton (Junctions 22 to 33). There is also a short dual four-lane section of the A14 that runs between Bar Hill and the Girton Interchange. There are three at-grade junctions: with the B663 at Bythorn in Cambridgeshire (junction 15); at the Leighton Bromswold turn a few miles to the east (junction 17); and at the Dockspur Roundabout at the edge of Felixstowe (junction 60).

There were two additional at-grade roundabouts along the former A14 main route, these being Brampton Hut Interchange (Junction 21) and Spittals Interchange (former Junction 23). However, these junctions are no longer part of the A14 since the opening of the new alignment south of Huntingdon in December 2019.

The old A14 from Huntingdon Spittals interchange to Godmanchester was closed both ways for a 2-year period, and has now reopened in 2022 as part of the A1307, after the Huntingdon railway viaduct has been dismantled. Link roads at Hinchingbrooke and Mill Common will connect the former A14 dual carriageway to the road network in Huntingdon.

== History ==
The current A14 includes parts of the former A45 between Felixstowe and Cambridge, the A604 between Cambridge and Kettering, a short stretch of the former A6 west of Kettering, plus a new link road which was constructed in the early 1990s between there and the M1/M6 interchange at Catthorpe, Leicestershire. The original A14 was known as the Royston - Alconbury Trunk Road, the original A604 was known as the Barton Seagrave - Harwich Trunk Road, and the original A45 was known as the Ipswich - Weedon Trunk Road.

Prior to the current A14, the main route from Birmingham to the Haven ports followed the M6, M1, A428 and A45 via Coventry, Rugby, Northampton, Bedford, St Neots and Cambridge, and then went through all the towns on the A14 to Felixstowe. Prior to its use for the current route, the A14 designation had been used for a section of road between the A10 at Royston and the A1 at Alconbury, following part of the route of Ermine Street which is now designated the A1198 to Godmanchester and the A1307 to Alconbury. The section through Huntingdon is now part of the A1307 following the opening of the Huntingdon by-pass; Highways England demolished a viaduct carrying the road over the River Great Ouse and the Great Northern railway and built new junctions with local roads.

The M45 motorway was constructed in 1959 parallel to part of the old A45 in the Midlands. It opened on the same day as the M1 motorway and was soon one of the busiest sections of the motorway. The M6 opened in the late 1960s and early 1970s, after which more traffic to the ports used the route from junction 1 of the M6 via the A427 to Market Harborough, followed by a short section of the A6 to Kettering and then the A604 to Cambridge, before joining the old A45 to the ports as above. The M45 now carries little traffic.

The sections from Huntingdon east to the ports were upgraded first, starting with the Huntingdon bypass in 1973, followed by the Girton to Bar Hill section in 1975/76 and the Cambridge northern bypass and Cambridge/Newmarket section in 1976/77. The Bar Hill-to-Huntingdon section opened in 1979, prior to the M11 which was fully opened in 1980. The Ipswich southern bypass, including the Orwell Bridge, opened between 1982 and 1985.

The A604 between Kettering and Huntingdon was upgraded and the section from Catthorpe to Kettering was constructed between 1989 and 1991 (commonly referred to at the time as the "M1-A1 link road") following a lengthy period of consultation. The first inquiry was in 1974 and then a series of inquiries for sections of the preferred route from September 1984 until June 1985, during which objections came from some 1,130 sources. Subsequent public inquiries were held regarding Supplementary Orders. The route close to the site of the Battle of Naseby was particularly difficult, and was taken to the High Court. The link was opened by Transport Secretary John MacGregor on 15 July 1994.

Work to create a compact grade-separated junction (Junction 45/Rougham) and to re-align a 2-mile (3.2 km) stretch of carriageway was completed in 2006.

Vehicles over 7.5 tonnes travelling east were banned from using the outside lane on a dual two-lane section on a 2-mile (3.2 km) steep climb to Welford summit close to Junction 1 (A5199) from spring 2007; a similar scheme covered 2 miles (3.2 km) of the westbound carriageway from Junction 2, including a particularly steep climb to Naseby summit. The bans are active between 6am and 8pm, and are intended to reduce delays to other traffic from lorries attempting to pass on these climbs.

Between 2007 and 2008 a new section of a two-lane dual carriageway was constructed at the Haughley Bends, one of Suffolk's most notorious accident blackspots, to rationalise access using a new grade-separated junction. The road opened in the summer of 2008 with some associated local works being completed early in 2009.

Variable Message Signs (VMS), traffic queue detection loops and closed circuit TV (CCTV) were installed at a cost of £50 million during 2009 to 2010 Both carriageways between Junction 52 (Claydon) and Junction 55 (Copdock) were refurbished during 2010 at a cost of £9 million. Work was being carried out a year earlier than scheduled as part of a UK government's fiscal stimulus package.

The Cambridgeshire Guided Busway connecting Cambridge, Huntingdon and St Ives, which opened in 2011, was intended to remove 5.6% of traffic using that section of the A14 (rising to 11.1% with the new Park & Ride sites), although as other traffic re-routes to the freed-up road space from other parts of the local road network, the net reduction is predicted to be 2.3%.

The Felixstowe and Nuneaton freight capacity scheme, designed to take more lorry traffic off the A14 between the Port and the Midlands by increasing rail capacity and allowing the carriage of larger 'Hi-cube' shipping containers by widening to the W10 loading gauge, opened in 2011.

Junction 55 (Copdock interchange) to the south of Ipswich was equipped with signalisation in 2011, along with lengthening the off-slip from the A1214. The section around Kettering between Junctions 7 and 9 was widened to three lanes between November 2013 and April 2015 at a cost of £42 million.

After initially being shelved in 2010, the Catthorpe Interchange at the road's Western terminus underwent a massive restructuring in 2014. The redesigned junction was intended to allow free-flowing traffic movement between the A14, the southern terminus of the M6 motorway and Junction 19 of the M1 motorway. The first part opened in September 2016, and the upgrade was completed three months later.

=== Construction ===
The contract for the 6.5 miles Huntingdon - Godmanchester bypass, from the A1 to Godmanchester, contract was given to A. Monk Ltd, of Padgate, on Tuesday 22 May 1973, for £6m. Construction began on Monday 4 June 1973, to finish in the summer of 1975. It was controversial. The local Conservative MP David Renton had played a large part in choosing the route, which not everyone had liked. The dual-carriageway bypass, from The Stukeleys to Godmanchester, opened as the A604 on Tuesday 30 September 1975. For many years this was the A14.

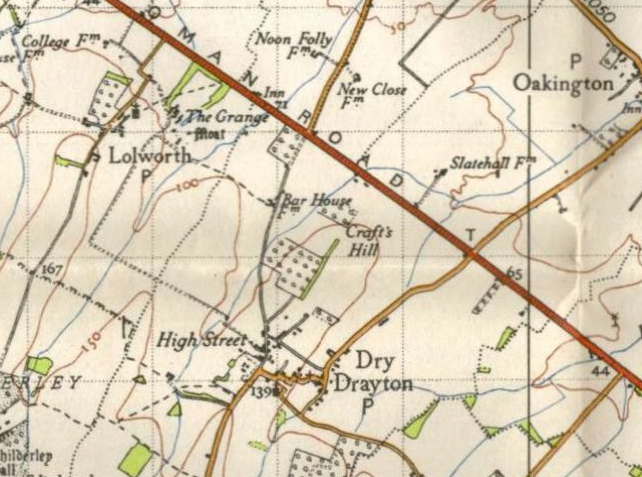
Former Bar Hill section in 1948

The Godmanchester to Bar Hill section was built by Sir Alfred McAlpine (Southern), opening in April 1981 as the A604. The Bar Hill to Swavesey section had opened first, in early December 1980. This section had originally been a three-lane single-carriageway road.

The original Fenstanton bypass had opened in early February 1965, as a single carriageway, built by Cementation Company.

The contract for the £350,000 intersection at Bar Hill, was awarded in February 1975 to Roadworks (1952) Ltd, of Ipswich.

The contract for the Girton to Bar Hill section was awarded on Monday 16 February 1976 to Roadworks (1952) Ltd, of Ipswich. Construction started in March 1976. The section opened in December 1977.

The 9.6-mile A45 Cambridge Northern bypass was accepted by the city council on Thursday 24 June 1971. The inquiry took place on Tuesday 15 February 1972 at the Guildhall, at the same time as the M11 bypass inquiry. The inquiry was proceeding in July, and was to take six weeks, but it took six months. The bypass was to be built by late 1975. By May 1974, the bypass was to start in late 1975, and to finish by mid 1977; it would cost £10m in December 1974. By September 1975, it was to cost £22m, and to start by January 1976. The A604 Girton to Bar Hill section was to start at the same time. In January 1976, the bypass was to start in April 1976. In March 1976, the bypass was to start in June 1976, with a tender accepted by May 1976, to take 18 months. In May 1976, the bypass would now open at the end of 1978. At the end of June 1976 a £16m contract was given to Bovis Civil Engineering, for the Madingley to Stow cum Quy section. The start of construction ceremony was held at Madingley on Friday 23 July 1976. The M11 bypass was to start in mid 1977, to be opened by February 1980. At 12pm on Thursday 21 December 1978 the Cambridge northern bypass was opened at Madingley by John Horam; it had taken took 28 months, but the Girton and Madingley interchanges were unfinished, and traffic was allowed late in the evening. The police were not happy with traffic on such an unfinished road.

For the 3.75-mile A45 Stow-cum-Quy to Nine Mile Hill section, a one-day inquiry was held in April 1975 in Bottisham. It was constructed by Monk from September 1976 to be finished by mid-1978, when the northern bypass should be approaching completion. The section opened in early April 1978.

The 14-mile A45 Newmarket bypass in 1971, was to start in late 1973. Wimpey started construction on 6 June 1973, costing £9,047,925. Two previous Labour transport secretaries had said that Newmarket did not need a bypass. The Conservatives disagreed. The Newmarket bypass opened on Friday 11 July 1975.

The 5.5-mile A45 Seven Mile Bridge to Westley Roundabout section, known as the Kentford bypass, was to start by mid 1975. It started in July 1975, and was to finish by July 1977, constructed by Higgs and Hill, costing £3,516,180.

The 3.75-mile A45 Bury bypass in 1971, was to start in early 1972, to be the first section of the new A45 to start. It was to start in May 1972, to take 24 months. It cost £2,696,230 late April, with the contract given to Monk, to take 18 months. The Bury bypass was opened at 11.30am on Friday 7 December 1973 by the town MP.

The 9.5-mile A45 Stowmarket-Claydon bypass in 1971, was to start in early 1973, the second section of the new A45 to start. Construction started on 29 May 1973 by W. & C. French, costing £8,972,857. It was built in two stages with 7 miles to the A140 at Beacon Hill to open in November 1974, then 3 miles to the A45 at Claydon in November 1975. But a lack of steel meant that the first section was eight months late and opened on Thursday 7 August 1975. The second section opened on Thursday 27 November 1975. One of the W. & C. French civil engineers working on the project, Richard Coult of Rushbrooke, West Suffolk, originally from Felixstowe, died on Turkish Airlines Flight 981 on 3 March 1974; he was one of the 17 players of Bury St Edmunds RUFC on the doomed flight.

The 5-mile (8 km) A45 Rougham to Woolpit Bypass section started in early 1977, costing £4.6 million. It was planned to open in January 1979, but opened four months late, due to bad weather. It was built by Amey Roadstone Construction (ARC). The section opened on Thursday 17 May 1979, which now gave dual carriageway to Ipswich.

The 2.2-mile (3.5 km) A45 Woolpit to Haughley New Street section started in October 1975, built by Monk, costing £1.6 million. It would take 21 months to be ready by August 1977. The section opened on 11 April 1977.

=== A14 Cambridge to Huntingdon Improvement Scheme ===
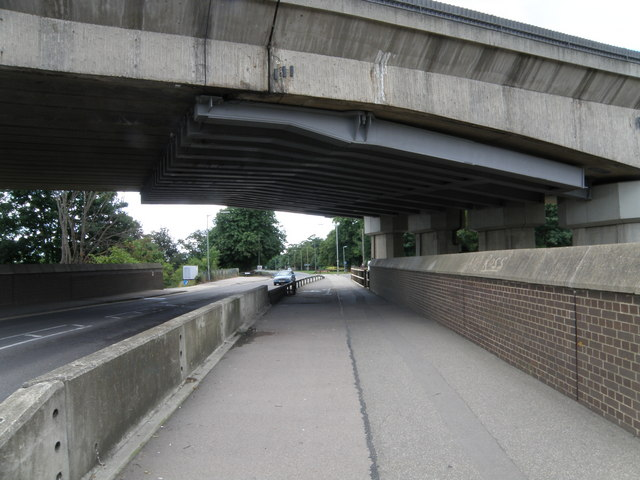
The former viaduct carrying the A14 over the ECML in Huntingdon. This shows the strengthening added to the structure due to the volume of traffic shortening its lifespan. The new bypass to the south has allowed this bridge to be removed.

The plan, originally called the 'A14 Ellington to Fen Ditton', was to include widening from Fen Ditton to Fen Drayton broadly on the existing alignment, and then a new route to be constructed from Fen Drayton to Ellington, the route following a widened A1 for a short distance south of Brampton Interchange. One of the main reasons for the widening and the new road was the volume of traffic using the existing road. This section was heavily used by local traffic, long-distance traffic to/from the M11 to A1(M), and freight traffic to/from Felixstowe and the Midlands. Another reason was the deteriorating condition of the Huntingdon viaduct over the East Coast Main Line. The viaduct was reaching the end of its life and needed replacing, a task that would require closing the road for a long period of time and not improve congestion.

The Highways Agency unveiled its plans in March 2005. Details of the preferred route for the Fen Drayton-to-Fen Ditton section were published in March 2007. The contract was awarded to Costain Skanska Joint Venture on 28 January 2008, which worked on detailed plans for the Highways Agency before publishing a draft order. The scheme was expected to open in stages between 2015 and 2016. The Highways Agency estimated that the widening and the new road would cost in total between £690 million and £1.2 billion, making this the most expensive scheme in its roads programme.

In October 2009 the cost estimate had risen to £1.3 billion with work due to start in 2012 and being completed in winter 2015/2016. The Campaign for Better Transport was opposed to the plans, listing their reasons for objection as the carbon emissions the road would induce, the cost, and its negative impact on non-car travel. The coalition government suspended the scheme when it came into power, with Philip Hammond, the Secretary of State for Transport, suggesting that the scheme would be 'axed', and that the only way it would get built was as a toll road. It was confirmed at the end of October that government money would not pay for the scheme, when Roads Minister Mike Penning said that the scheme was not affordable and no longer offered acceptable value for money. The scheme was officially cancelled in 2010.

In 2011, the government announced an 'A14 Challenge' inviting people to present proposals for the route. The revised scheme was similar to its predecessor and was now known as the 'A14 Cambridge to Huntingdon Improvement Scheme'. It involved widening of the A1 between Brampton and Alconbury, a new Huntingdon southern bypass, widening of the existing A14 from Swavesey to Milton, and a new local access road between Swavesey and Girton. The A14 through Huntingdon around the Huntingdon viaduct would be redundant and the viaduct demolished. In November 2012, it was reported that the scheme might be back on a fast track to implementation and it was mentioned in the June 2013 spending review. The project was approved by the Secretary of State for Transport in May 2016. Work was due to be completed by March 2021 at a cost of £1.2–1.8 billion. The works gave rise to one of the largest commercial archaeological projects ever undertaken in the UK.

In September 2018, Highways England said it was to ask the Planning Inspectorate to consider giving the upgraded section of A14 motorway status, to be known as the A14(M). However, shortly after the amendment of the Development Consent Order, the announcement came that the new Huntingdon southern bypass, between Brampton and the A1 to Swavesey, was ready a year ahead of schedule. Instead of waiting for the road to be reclassified, Highways England made the decision to withdraw the application so the road could be opened to traffic as soon as possible.

The 12 miles (19 km) of new bypass opened a year ahead of schedule from the A14 at Swavesey to the A1 at Brampton on 9 December 2019, and the remainder of the route opened on 5 May 2020. A smart motorway in all but name, the new road has variable message signs and gantries, emergency SOS lay-bys and virtually all non-motorway traffic is prohibited from using the new road (this includes pedestrians, cyclists, horse riders, horses & carriages, motorcycles under 50cc and agricultural vehicles). The new route is also to be supplied with variable speed limits to reduce congestion when legislation is passed to allow this technology to be used on primary roads.

At the same time as the southern section opening, junctions on the A14 between Ellington and Bar Hill were renumbered. This upgraded section of the A14 has fewer junctions than previously; junctions 26 to 30 no longer exist. The section of the old A14 from Godmanchester to the Spittals interchange in Huntingdon was permanently closed after the Huntington bypass opened, in order to remove the Huntingdon viaduct over the East Coast Main Line. The project to build new links to the town centre is to be completed by 2022.

The construction works of the section between Huntingdon and Godmanchester, specifically where the River Great Ouse is crossed, was painted by Michael Murfin, a local artist. The artist's work records various stages of the build, depicting workers on the site and the heavy machinery used in the construction of the viaduct.

== Junction list ==
County	Location	mi	km	Jct	Destinations	Notes
Leicestershire	Catthorpe Interchange	0.0	0.0		M1 north / M6 north – The North, The North West, Coventry	Western terminus; no access from A14 to M1 south or from M1 north to A14; southern terminus of M6
Northamptonshire	Cold Ashby	6.2– 6.5	10.0– 10.5	1	A5199 – Welford	
Northamptonshire	Kelmarsh	11.1– 11.7	17.9– 18.8	2	A508 – Market Harborough, Northampton, Kelmarsh, Maidwell, Brixworth	
Northamptonshire	Rothwell	15.7– 16.1	25.3– 25.9	3	A6 north – Market Harborough, Desborough, Rothwell, Loddington, Leicester	Rothwell and Loddington signed eastbound only, Leicester westbound only; western terminus of A6 concurrency
Northamptonshire	Rothwell	16.7	26.9	4	B669 – Rothwell, Loddington	Westbound exit and eastbound entrance
Northamptonshire	Rothwell	17.0	27.4	5	Rothwell Lodge service area	
Northamptonshire	Rothwell	18.1	29.1	6	Rothwell Grange and Farm	
Northamptonshire	Thorpe Malsor— Kettering boundary	18.5– 19.0	29.8– 30.6	7	A43 north-east – Stamford, Corby, Kettering	Western terminus of A43 concurrency
Northamptonshire	Cransley—Kettering— Broughton boundary	19.6– 20.3	31.5– 32.7	8	A43 south-west / A6013 north-east – Northampton, Kettering (west), Broughton	Eastern terminus of A43 concurrency; south-western terminus of A6013
Northamptonshire	Kettering— Pytchley boundary	21.6– 22.2	34.8– 35.7	9	A509 – Wellingborough, Kettering (south), Great Harrowden, Isham, Pytchley	Pytchley signed westbound only
Northamptonshire	Burton Latimer— Kettering boundary	23.0– 23.4	37.0– 37.7	10	A6 south – Kettering, Bedford, Barton Seagrave, Burton Latimer, Finedon, Higham Ferrers, Rushden	Eastern terminus of A6 concurrency
Northamptonshire	Twywell	25.8– 26.0	41.5– 41.8	11	A510 south-west – Wellingborough, Cranford, Woodford, The Addingtons, Finedon	Only Wellingborough signed eastbound; north-eastern terminus of A510
Northamptonshire	Islip	28.7– 29.1	46.2– 46.8	12	A6116 north-west – Corby, Islip, Twywell, Woodford	Only Corby signed eastbound; south-eastern terminus of A6116
Northamptonshire	Thrapston	30.1– 30.6	48.4– 49.2	13	A45 west / A605 east – Wellingborough, Northampton, Peterborough, Oundle, Raunds, Rushden	Rushden signed westbound only; eastern terminus of A45; western terminus of A605
Northamptonshire	Thrapston	31.5	50.7	14	Titchmarsh	At-grade intersection
Cambridgeshire	Bythorn and Keyston	33.4	53.8	15	B663 – Keyston, Bythorn, Molesworth	At-grade intersection
Cambridgeshire	Catworth	36.0	57.9	16	B660 – Old Weston, Kimbolton, Catworth, Molesworth, Brington	
Cambridgeshire	Leighton—Catworth boundary	37.3	60.0	17	Leighton Bromswold	At-grade intersection
Cambridgeshire	Spaldwick	38.4– 38.7	61.8– 62.3	18	Spaldwick, Stow Longa, Barham	No westbound exit
Cambridgeshire	Spaldwick	39.1– 39.2	62.9– 63.1	18	Spaldwick, Stow Longa, Barham	Westbound exit and entrance
Cambridgeshire	Easton	39.7	63.9	19	Easton	At-grade intersection
Cambridgeshire	Easton	39.9	64.2	19A	Woolley	At-grade intersection
Cambridgeshire	Ellington	40.5– 41.4	65.2– 66.6		Ellington	
Cambridgeshire	Brampton	42.3	68.1	21	A141 north-east to A1 – The North, Peterborough, London (central & west), Huntingdon	Eastbound exit and westbound entrance
Cambridgeshire	Brampton	44.7	71.9	22	A1 north – The North, Peterborough	Westbound exit and eastbound entrance
Cambridgeshire	Godmanchester	48.4	77.9	23	A1198 – St Ives, Royston, Godmanchester	Eastbound exit and westbound entrance
Cambridgeshire	Swavesey—Boxworth boundary	54.0– 54.8	86.9– 88.2	24	A1307 – Swavesey, Fenstanton, Lolworth, Huntingdon, St Ives	Fenstanton and Lolworth signed eastbound only; Huntingdon, Godmanchester, and St Ives westbound only
Cambridgeshire	Boxworth	55.2	88.8	24A	Boxworth	Westbound exit only
Cambridgeshire	Longstanton— Bar Hill boundary	56.2– 56.8	90.4– 91.4	25	B1050 – Longstanton, Northstowe, Bar Hill	
Cambridgeshire	Madingley— Girton boundary	58.2– 59.7	93.7– 96.1	31	M11 south – London, Stansted Airport, Cambridge (south)	Only London signed westbound; northern terminus of M11
Cambridgeshire	Madingley— Girton boundary	58.2– 59.7	93.7– 96.1	31	A1307 – Cambridge (central)	Eastbound exit and westbound entrance
Cambridgeshire	Madingley— Girton boundary	58.2– 59.7	93.7– 96.1	31	A428 west – Bedford	Westbound exit and eastbound entrance
Cambridgeshire	Impington	60.7– 61.2	97.7– 98.5	32	B1049 – Cambridge, Histon	
Cambridgeshire	Milton	62.3– 62.8	100.3– 101.1	33	A10 north / A1309 south-west – Ely, Cambridge, Milton	Southern terminus of A10; north-eastern terminus of A1309
Cambridgeshire	Horningsea	63.7	102.5	34	B1047 – Horningsea, Fen Ditton	Eastbound exit and westbound entrance
Cambridgeshire	Stow cum Quy	65.7– 66.2	105.7– 106.5	35	A1303 to B1102 – Cambridge, Burwell, Newmarket, Swaffham Prior, Swaffham Bulbeck, Bottisham, Lode, Quy	Only Cambridge and Burwell signed westbound
Cambridgeshire	Swaffham Bulbeck	70.5	113.5	36	A11 west to M11 – London, Harlow	Westbound exit and eastbound entrance; western terminus of A11 concurrency
Suffolk	Newmarket— Exning boundary	74.9– 75.4	120.5– 121.3	37	A142 – Ely, Newmarket, Soham, Fordham, Exning	
Cambridgeshire	Chippenham	77.5	124.7	38	A11 east – Thetford, Norwich	Eastbound exit and westbound entrance; eastern terminus of A11 concurrency
Suffolk	Gazeley	88.1	141.8	39	B1506 – Newmarket, Kentford, Chippenham	Westbound exit and eastbound entrance
Suffolk	Higham	82.1– 83.0	132.1– 133.6	40	Tuddenham, Cavenham, Barrow, West Higham	
Suffolk	The Saxhams— Risby boundary	84.4– 86.2	135.8– 138.7	41	Little Saxham, Risby	
Suffolk	Fornham All Saints— Westley boundary	87.1– 87.6	140.2– 141.0	42	A1302 south-east / B1106 – Bury St Edmunds (west), Brandon, Fornham	Fornham signed eastbound only; north-western terminus of A1302
Suffolk	Bury St Edmunds	89.1– 89.5	143.4– 144.0	43	A134 north / A143 – Bury St Edmunds (central), Diss, Thetford	Thetford signed westbound only; western terminus of A134 concurrency
Suffolk	Bury St Edmunds	90.4– 90.9	145.5– 146.3	44	A134 south to A143 – Bury St Edmunds (east), Sudbury, Haverhill	To A143 and Haverhill signed westbound only; eastern terminus of A134 concurrency
Suffolk	Rushbrooke with Rougham	92.6– 92.8	149.0– 149.3	45	Great Barton, Rougham	
Suffolk	Thurston— Beyton boundary	94.6– 95.6	152.2– 153.9	46	Thurston, Beyton	No eastbound entrance
Suffolk	Elmswell— Woolpit boundary	97.7	157.2	47	A1088 north – Ixworth	
Suffolk	Elmswell— Woolpit boundary	98.3	158.2	47A	Wetherden, Haughley Park, Haughley New Street	Eastbound exit only
Suffolk	Haughley	101.8– 102.2	163.8– 164.5	49	A1308 south-east – Stowmarket, Haughley, Bacton	North-western terminus of A1308
Suffolk	Creeting St Peter— Stowupland boundary	104.2– 104.8	167.7– 168.7	50	A1120 / B1113 – Stowmarket, Needham Market, Stowupland, Bacton	To B1113 and Bacton signed eastbound only
Suffolk	Creeting St Mary— Coddenham boundary	107.7– 108.6	173.3– 174.8	51	A140 north to B1078 – Diss, Norwich, Needham Market	Southern terminus of A140
Suffolk	Claydon	111.2– 111.9	179.0– 180.1	52	B1113 – Great Blakenham, Bramford, Claydon	
Suffolk	Ipswich	112.5– 113.1	181.1– 182.0	53	A1156 south-east – Ipswich	North-western terminus of A1156
Suffolk	Sproughton	114.4	184.1	54	Sproughton	
Suffolk		116.3– 116.9	187.2– 188.1	55	A12 south-west / A1214 east – Harwich, Colchester, Ipswich	Western terminus of A12 concurrency; western terminus of A1214
Suffolk	Wherstead	118.3– 118.7	190.4– 191.0	56	A137 – Ipswich, Manningtree, Brantham	
Suffolk	Wherstead— Ipswich boundary	119.1– 120.0	191.7– 193.1	Orwell Bridge over River Orwell		
Suffolk	Ipswich	121.3– 121.8	195.2– 196.0	57	A1189 – Ipswich, Nacton	
Suffolk		123.3– 123.9	198.4– 199.4	57	A12 north / A1156 north-west – Lowestoft, Woodbridge, Ipswich, Levington, Bucklesham	Only Lowestoft and Ipswich signed westbound; eastern terminus of A12 concurrency; south-eastern terminus of A1156
Suffolk	Stratton Hall	125.4	201.8		Levington	Westbound exit and entrance
Suffolk	Trimley St Martin— Stratton Hall boundary	125.7	202.3		Bucklesham, Brightwell	Eastbound exit and entrance
Suffolk	Trimley St Martin	127.1– 127.7	204.5– 205.5	59	Trimley	
Suffolk	Trimley St Mary— Felixstowe boundary	128.4	206.6	60	A154 – Felixstowe town centre	Roundabout
Suffolk	Trimley St Mary— Felixstowe boundary	129.3	208.1	61	A154 – Dock Gate No. 2	Eastbound exit and westbound entrance
Suffolk	Felixstowe	130.1	209.4	62	Dock Gate No. 1, Sea front (A154)	Eastern terminus; roundabout
1.000 mi = 1.609 km; 1.000 km = 0.621 mi: Incomplete access

== Road number signage and history ==
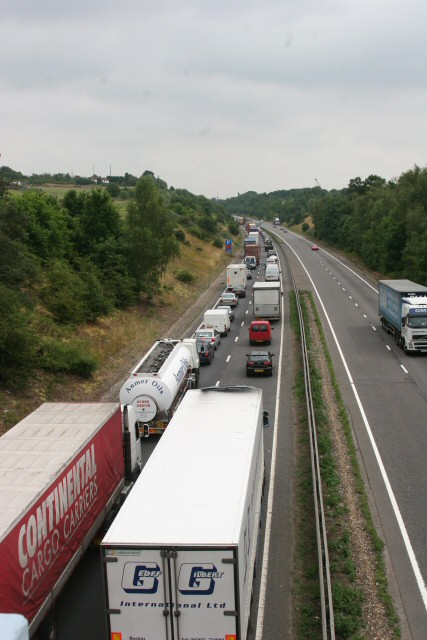
A14 congestion near Needham Market (6 July 2006)

The numbering of the A14 is inconsistent with the national road numbering scheme, as it begins in zone 5 and crosses through zone 6 on the way to zone 1 east of Huntingdon to Felixstowe. The road is concurrent with the A12 road from the Seven Hills Interchange to the Copdock Interchange which forms the Ipswich Southern bypass and with the A11 road between junctions 36 and 38.

From the A12 west of Ipswich to the M1/M6 junction, the A14 is part of (but not signed as) the E-road E 24, and from Ipswich to Felixstowe it is part of E 30.

East of the Girton Interchange with the M11 at Cambridge, the A14 used to be the A45, and much of the long-distance traffic further west had previously used the A45 route. The section between Cambridge and Kettering used to be the A604, apart from a short section near Kettering that used to be part of the A6. The road which was the A14 until the late 1980s is now the A1198 between Royston, Hertfordshire and Godmanchester.

=== Identity of the A14 spur north of Huntingdon ===
Until the opening in 2019 of the Huntingdon bypass, there was some confusion as to the identity of the section of road between the A141 junction at Stukeley (Spittals Interchange) and the A1(M). The Ordnance Survey 1:25000 map showed the A-road section as part of the A14 and the motorway section (between the B1043 junction and the A1(M)) as the A14(M). However, some official documents, including the 1993 statutory instrument which authorised the motorway upgrade, referred to it as the A604(M). The same confusion appeared on the former Highways Agency page about the 1996-8 upgrade to the A1(M) between Alconbury and Peterborough. The signs on entering the motorway section, unusually, show a large "start of motorway" symbol with no number, and there are no driver location signs confirming the route number.

Following the opening of the Huntingdon bypass, the former A14 between the A1(M) and the Cambridge Services at Swavesey has been renumbered A1307, with the section through Huntingdon itself closed for the time being. Therefore, the "Alconbury spur" of the former A14 trunk route finally carries a unique road number again, in the form of the A1307. The official number of the former A14(M) stub is not known: some claim it is still A14(M), as the new road did not become a motorway in the end; others claim A604(M), although the lack of an A604 makes this hard to believe; and others still claim it is just a spur of the A1(M), carrying the same number.

== Longer term plans ==
The Highways Agency has plans to increase capacity from junction 3 to junction 10 near Kettering 'in the longer term' and also to widen the road throughout Northamptonshire to "help cut the number of accidents and cope with the likely growth in traffic".

== Notable incidents ==
- 17 November 1998. A lorry collided with the petrol station between Bar Hill and Lolworth. The incident happened shortly before 11 am and one person was killed and many others injured. The road was closed and there were huge tailbacks.
- 26 July 2006. The A14 was closed for 24 hours near Newmarket when a van carrying acetylene gas canisters caught fire and the rescue services were advised by BOC that they could remain unstable and would need 24 hours to cool. Bomb disposal officers were called in and the Red Cross set up a centre in Newmarket for those who were stranded.
