= Stow Longa =

Village in Cambridgeshire, England

Coordinates: 52.33°N 0.37°W

- Location within Cambridgeshire
- Population: 144 (2011)
- OS grid reference: TL110715
- District: Huntingdonshire
- Shire county: Cambridgeshire
- Region: East
- Country: England
- Sovereign state: United Kingdom
- Post town: Huntingdon
- Postcode district: PE28
- Police: Cambridgeshire
- Fire: Cambridgeshire
- Ambulance: East of England
- UK Parliament: North West Cambridgeshire
- Website: http://www.stowlonga.org.uk

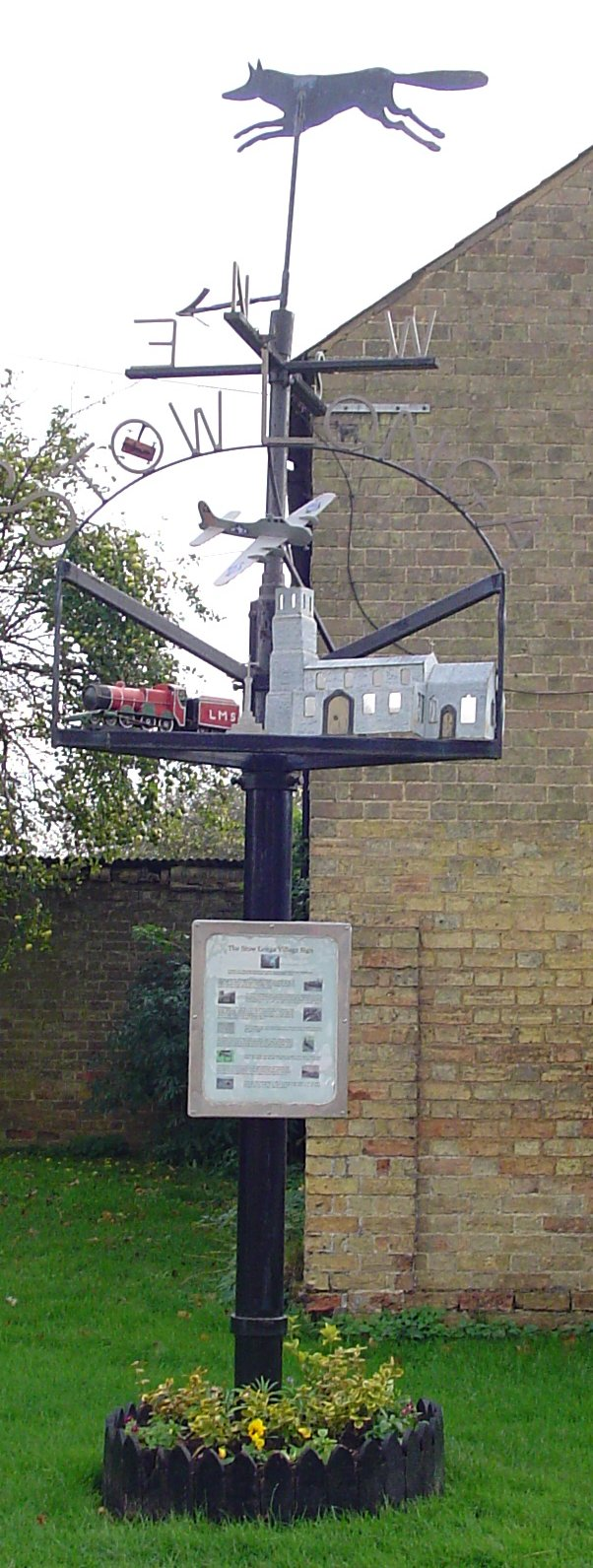
Village sign in Stow Longa

Stow Longa is a village and civil parish in Cambridgeshire, England. Stow Longa lies approximately 8 miles (13 km) west of Huntingdon and two miles north of Kimbolton. Stow Longa is situated within Huntingdonshire which is a non-metropolitan district of Cambridgeshire as well as being a historic county of England.

Stow Longa's original name was Stow or Long Stow, which comes from the Old English word stōw (meaning 'holy place') and the Latin word longa or Old English lang (meaning 'long'). Altogether, Stow Longa's name may mean 'the long holy place' or 'an extended settlement which is a holy place', though this is only a rough guess.

Stow was also thought to have been the name of the pre-Conquest estate, which, in the medieval period, was split between two parishes: one, Over Stow or Upper Stow, the western part, which belonged to the Kimbolton parish, and the other, Estou (also Nether Stow or Long Stow), the eastern part, which was part of the soke of Spaldwick.

Mistakenly described as a hamlet, it has the suitable number of houses and businesses to make it a village. Stow Longa is a village that is still void of any street lamps, village shops, a school or a public house. Sewer drainage came to the village in 2009. However, Stow Longa does possess several thatched cottages, a village room, a blocked-up well (on the village green), a stone cross (discussed below) and mature elm trees that survived the Dutch elm disease crisis.

RAF Kimbolton was opened as a bomber airfield on the southern edge of the village in 1941, and was operated by the USAAF from 1942 to 1945.

According to a locally published collection of short stories, 'Ploughing Songs' by Damian Croft, the reason why the public houses that were in Stow Longa were closed down in the 1950s was because, "returning drovers used it to give a bad name to a few otherwise nameless women."

== Early history ==
Before it was transferred to the Spaldwick parish in AD 991, the Stow estate had belonged to Brithnoth, Ealdorman of Essex, who died at the Battle of Maldon in AD 991. Brithnoth left his two estates, Spaldwick and Somersham, to the Abbot of Ely.

== Government ==
For Stow Longa the highest tier of local government is Cambridgeshire County Council. Stow Longa is part of the electoral division of Sawtry and Ellington, and is represented on the county council by one councillor. The second tier of local government is Huntingdonshire District Council, a non-metropolitan district of Cambridgeshire. Stow Longa is a part of the district ward of Ellington and is represented on the district council by one councillor. As a civil parish, Stow Longa has a parish council.

On 1 April 1955 the parish was renamed from "Stow" to "Stow Longa". Stow Longa was in the historic and administrative county of Huntingdonshire until 1965. From 1965, the village was part of the new administrative county of Huntingdon and Peterborough. Then in 1974, following the Local Government Act 1972, Stow Longa became a part of the county of Cambridgeshire.

At Westminster Stow Longa is in the parliamentary constituency of North West Cambridgeshire, and has been represented since 2005 in the House of Commons by Shailesh Vara (Conservative).

== Demography ==
=== Population ===
In the period 1801 to 1901 the population of Stow Longa was recorded every ten years by the UK census. During this time the population was in the range of 96 (the lowest was in 1901) and 263 (the highest was in 1841).

From 1901, a census was taken every ten years with the exception of 1941 (due to the Second World War).

Parish	1911	1921	1931	1951	1961	1971	1981	1991	2001	2011
Stow Longa	102	90	90	84	89	118	112	106	135	144

All population census figures from report Historic Census figures Cambridgeshire to 2011 by Cambridgeshire Insight.

In 2011, the parish covered an area of 1,021 acres (413 hectares) and the population density of Stow Longa in 2011 was 90.3 persons per square mile (34.9 per square kilometre).

== Stow Longa's church ==
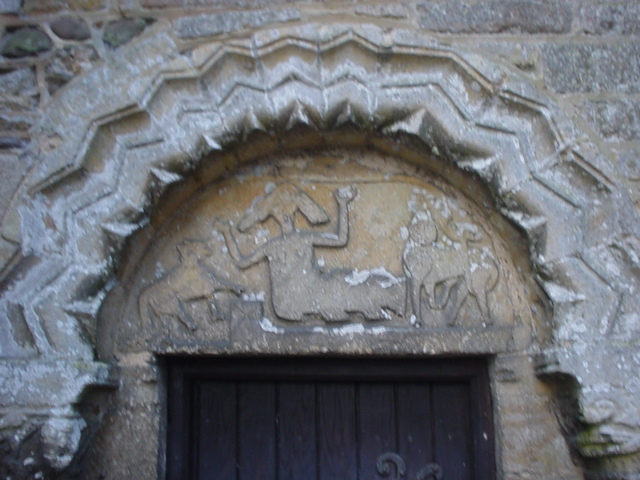
The Mermaid Stone tympanum above the door to St Botolph's Church

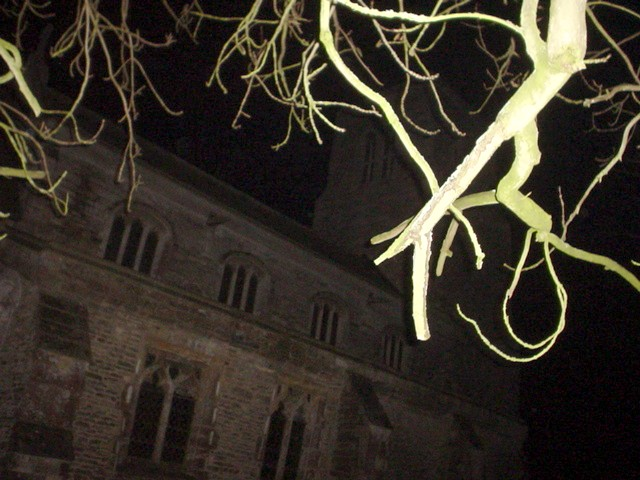
St Botolph's at night

The Anglican church of Stow Longa is known as St Botolph's, since it is dedicated to St Botolph, which dates to the 13th century, though a stone slab with inter-laced works (probably pre-Conquest) on the south-side indicates an earlier date.

Though peaceful and fairly hidden today, the church in Stow Longa has had a remarkable history. Stow Longa was confirmed a prebend by Pope Eugene III on 6 February 1146, and again by Pope Alexander III on 5 January 1163. A minster or mother-church of the local estate (which included Stow Longa, Spaldwick, Easton, Little Catworth, Barham and Upthorpe) before its importance was subsumed by Spaldwick and Kimbolton, St Botolph's wealth and importance attracted noted figures to the prebendary, such as Thomas Wolsey, who was Stow Longa's prebend from 1509 to 1514.

Above the priest door, outside the east side of the church, is the nationally important stone carving known as the Mermaid Stone (or the Beckoning Mermaid Stone), since the engraving displays a mermaid between two creatures. According to one source, the creature on the right of the mermaid represents the crocodile (a creature of damnation) and the creature on the left of the mermaid, though on our right, represents the lamb, i.e. the Lamb of God (Jesus Christ). An alternative interpretation of the Mermaid Stone could be:

- Sins – the mermaid represents the sin of lust, whilst going in the direction of the beast on her right (representing hell) and turning her back against the beast on her left (representing the Kingdom of God).
- Anti-Paganism – even though this interpretation has no real backup, the Mermaid Stone may represent (based on the fact that a stream passes by the church) the struggle between Goddess worship (who may be either a river deity or whose attributes are scorned as lustful) – going towards Hell and leaving Christ – and the emerging Christian religion.

== The village green cross ==
The common misinterpretation of the cross is that it was a marker point of where the coffin of Catherine of Aragon rested, after she died at nearby Kimbolton Castle: actually, the cross is Medieval and pre-dates its supposed use.

== See also ==
- Maples Baronets
