= Little Catworth Meadow =

Protected area in Cambridgeshire, England

Coordinates: 52.341°N 0.382°W

- Site of Special Scientific Interest
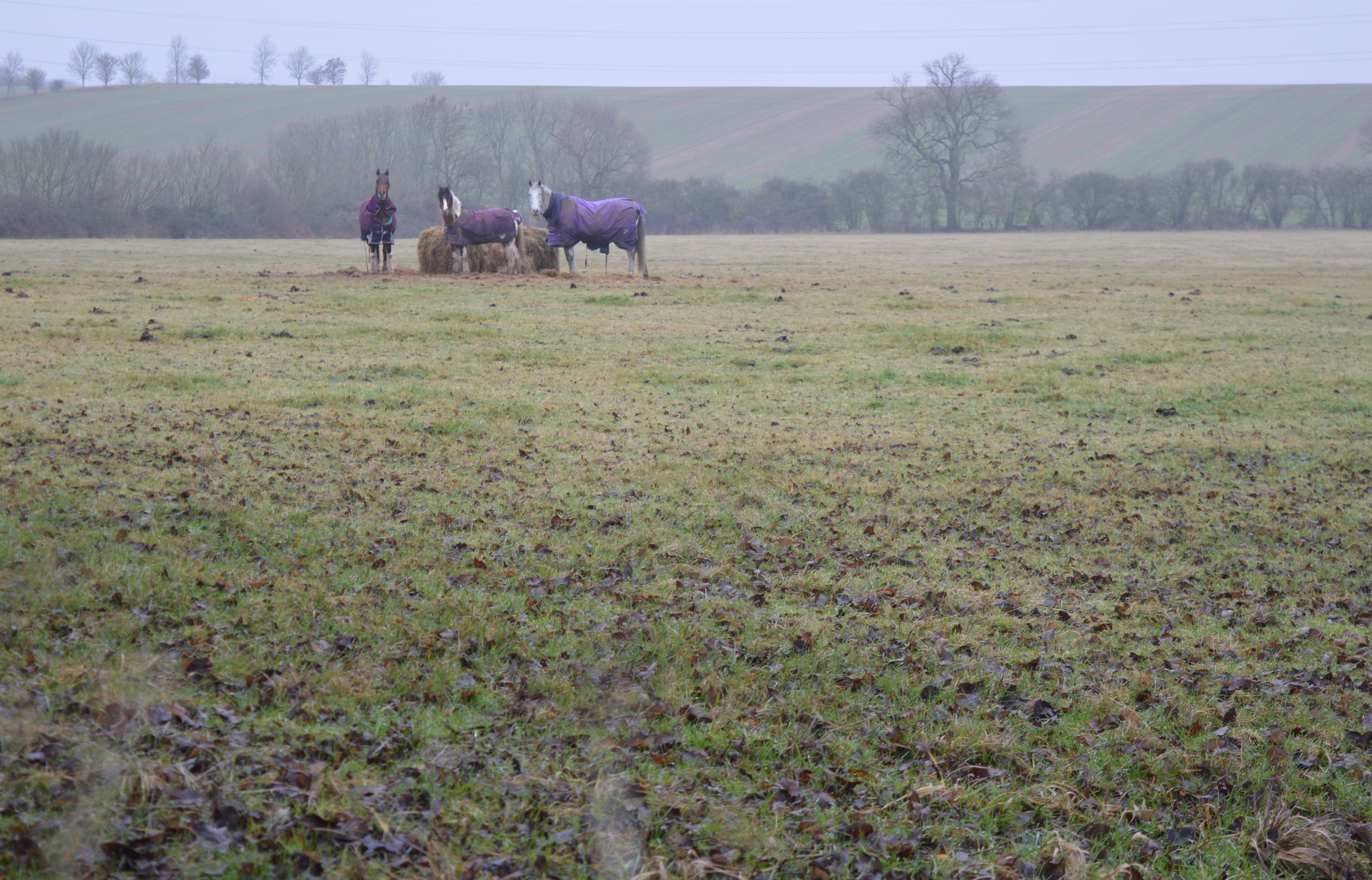
- Location of Little Catworth Meadow.
- Area of search: Cambridgeshire
- Grid reference: TL 103 727
- Interest: Biological
- Area: 5.2 hectares
- Notification date: 1984
- Location map: Magic Map

Little Catworth Meadow is a 5.2-hectare (13-acre) biological Site of Special Scientific Interest between Catworth and Spaldwick in Cambridgeshire.

The meadow is traditionally managed grassland on calcareous loam, which is rare in Britain. It has mature hedgerows and it has a rich variety of plants such as salad burnet, dropwort, great burnet, green-winged orchid and adder's-tongue fern.

The site is private land with no public access.
