= Pennyhole Bay =

Bay in Essex, England

Coordinates: 51.8829°N 1.3024°E

Pennyhole Bay is a stretch of water situated to the south of the port of Harwich in Essex, England where the rivers Stour and Orwell flow into the sea, and north of Walton-on-the-Naze in Essex. Much of the bay is clogged up with Shoals. The Pennyhole Bay Race is an annual gaff rig sailing race which traditionally starts from either Suffolk Yacht Harbour in Levington or from Stone Point.
