= Ellington, Cambridgeshire =

Village in Cambridgeshire, England

Coordinates: 52.33°N 0.30°W

Ellington
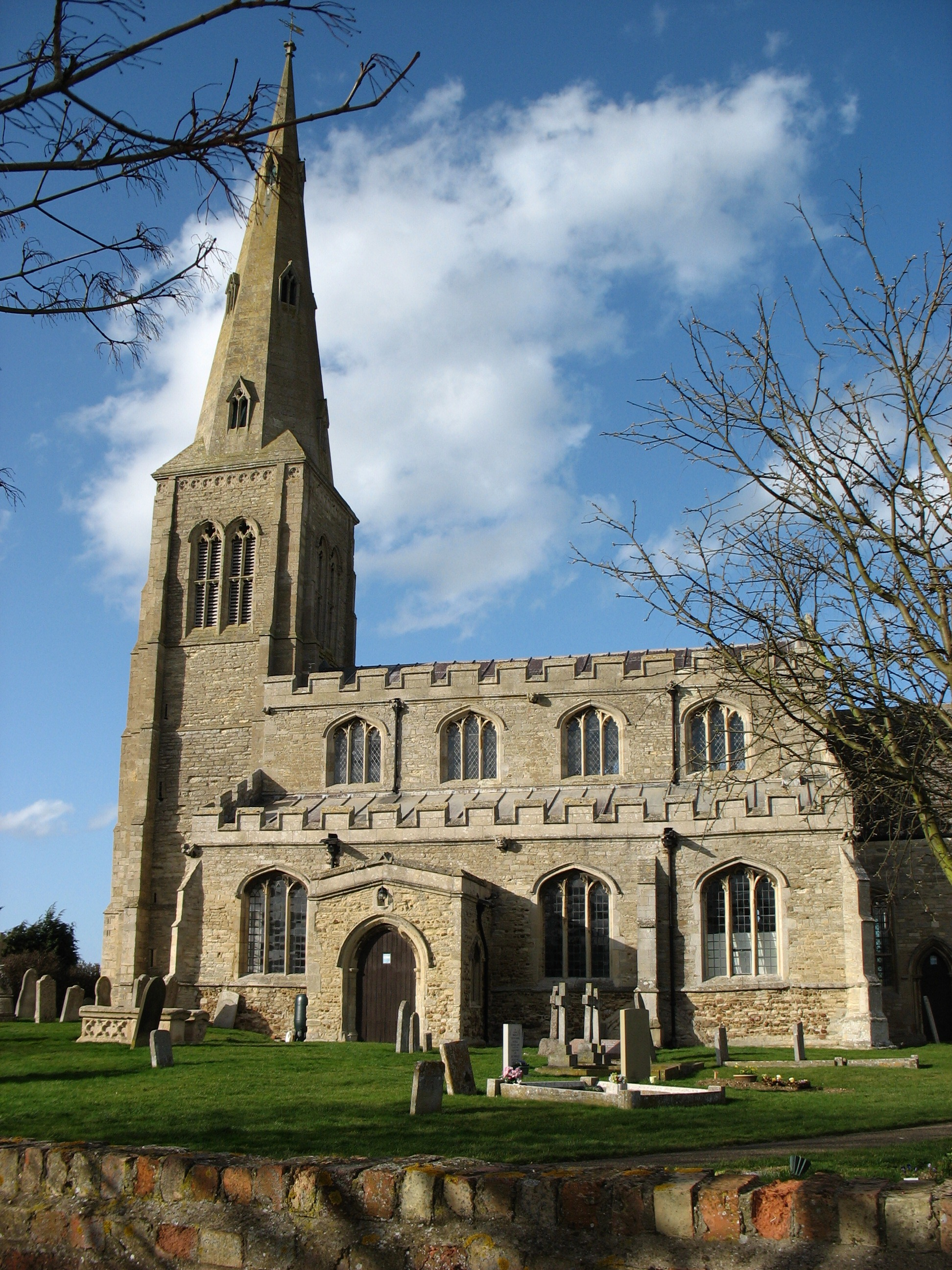
- All Saints Church, Ellington

- Location within Cambridgeshire
- Population: 585 (2011)
- OS grid reference: TL160718
  - London: 57 miles (92 km)
- District: Huntingdonshire
- Shire county: Cambridgeshire
- Region: East
- Country: England
- Sovereign state: United Kingdom
- Post town: Huntingdon
- Postcode district: PE28
- Dialling code: 01480
- Police: Cambridgeshire
- Fire: Cambridgeshire
- Ambulance: East of England
- UK Parliament: North West Cambridgeshire

Ellington is a village and civil parish in Cambridgeshire, England, 4 miles (6 km) west of Huntingdon in Huntingdonshire, a non-metropolitan district of Cambridgeshire and historic county of England. The civil parish covers an area of 2,700 acres (1,100 hectares); much of it is grassland with some small woods in the south of the parish.

The village had 235 households and a population of 585 at the 2011 census. The civil parish also includes Ellington Thorpe, a smaller settlement 1 mile (1.6 km) south of Ellington with a few 17th-century cottages, previously known as Sibthorpe.

== History ==
In 1085, William the Conqueror ordered that a survey should be carried out across his kingdom to discover who owned which parts and what it was worth. The survey took place in 1086 and the results were recorded in what, since the 12th century, has become known as the Domesday Book. Starting with the king himself, for each landholder within a county there is a list of their estates or manors; and, for each manor, there is a summary of the resources of the manor, the amount of annual rent that was collected by the lord of the manor both in 1066 and in 1086, together with the taxable value.

Ellington was listed in the Domesday Book in the Hundred of Leightonstone in Huntingdonshire; the name of the settlement was written as Elintune in the Domesday Book. In 1086 there was just one manor at Ellington; the annual rent paid to the lord of the manor in 1066 had been £10 and the rent was the same in 1086. The lands belonged to the Benedictine abbey at Ramsey.

The Domesday Book does not explicitly detail the population of a place but it records that there was 31 households at Ellington. There is no consensus about the average size of a household at that time; estimates range from 3.5 to 5.0 people per household. Using these figures then an estimate of the population of Ellington in 1086 is that it was within the range of 108 and 155 people.

The Domesday Book uses a number of units of measure for areas of land that are now unfamiliar terms, such as hides and ploughlands. In different parts of the country, these were terms for the area of land that a team of eight oxen could plough in a single season and are equivalent to 120 acres (49 hectares); this was the amount of land that was considered to be sufficient to support a single family. By 1086, the hide had become a unit of tax assessment rather than an actual land area; a hide was the amount of land that could be assessed as £1 for tax purposes. The survey records that there were 16 ploughlands at Ellington in 1086. In addition to the arable land, there was 60 acres (24 hectares) of meadows at Ellington.

The tax assessment in the Domesday Book was known as geld or danegeld and was a type of land-tax based on the hide or ploughland. It was originally a way of collecting a tribute to pay off the Danes when they attacked England, and was only levied when necessary. Following the Norman Conquest, the geld was used to raise money for the King and to pay for continental wars; by 1130, the geld was being collected annually. Having determined the value of a manor's land and other assets, a tax of so many shillings and pence per pound of value would be levied on the land holder. While this was typically two shillings in the pound the amount did vary; for example, in 1084 it was as high as six shillings in the pound. For the manor at Ellington the total tax assessed was 10 geld.

By 1086 there was already a church and a priest at Ellington.

Much of the land in the parish was enclosed in 1774.

In 1870, Ellington was described as,

"A parish in the district and county of Huntingdon; on an affluent of the river Ouse, 5 miles W of Huntingdon r. station. Post town, Brampton, under Huntingdon. Acres, 2, 910. Real property, £3, 956. Pop., 413. Houses, 95. The property is much sub-divided. The living is a vicarage in the diocese of Ely. Value, £168.* Patron, St. Peter's College, Cambridge. The church is good; and there are a Baptist chapel, and charities £56."

For civil registration Ellington was a district of Huntingdonshire from 1 July 1837. Following this it became a sub-district of Spaldwick, but has now returned to being a district of Huntingdonshire.

The first recorded manor house located in Ellington no longer exists. The manor house itself was owned by the tenants of Ramsey Abbey.

== Governance ==
As a civil parish, Ellington has a parish council. The parish council is elected by the residents of the parish who have registered on the electoral roll; the parish council is the lowest tier of government in England. A parish council is responsible for providing and maintaining a variety of local services including allotments and a cemetery; grass cutting and tree planting within public open spaces such as a village green or playing fields. The parish council reviews all planning applications that might affect the parish and makes recommendations to Huntingdonshire District Council, which is the local planning authority for the parish. The parish council also represents the views of the parish on issues such as local transport, policing and the environment. The parish council raises its own tax to pay for these services, known as the parish precept, which is collected as part of the Council Tax. The parish council consists of seven members and a parish clerk.

Ellington was in the historic and administrative county of Huntingdonshire until 1965. From 1965, the village was part of the new administrative county of Huntingdon and Peterborough. Then in 1974, following the Local Government Act 1972, Ellington became a part of the county of Cambridgeshire.

The second tier of local government is Huntingdonshire District Council which is a non-metropolitan district of Cambridgeshire and has its headquarters in Huntingdon. Huntingdonshire District Council has 52 councillors representing 29 district wards. Huntingdonshire District Council collects the council tax, and provides services such as building regulations, local planning, environmental health, leisure and tourism. Ellington is a district ward and is represented on the district council by one councillor. District councillors serve for four-year terms following elections to Huntingdonshire District Council.

For Ellington the highest tier of local government is Cambridgeshire County Council which has administration buildings in Cambridge. The county council provides county-wide services such as major road infrastructure, fire and rescue, education, social services, libraries and heritage services. Cambridgeshire County Council consists of 69 councillors representing 60 electoral divisions. Ellington is part of the electoral division of Sawtry and Ellington and is represented on the county council by one councillor.

At Westminster Ellington is in the parliamentary constituency of North West Cambridgeshire, and elects one Member of Parliament (MP) by the first past the post system of election. Ellington is represented in the House of Commons by Shailesh Vara (Conservative). Shailesh Vara has represented the constituency since 2005. The previous member of parliament was Brian Mawhinney (Conservative) who represented the constituency between 1997 and 2005.

== Geography ==
The village and parish lies on a bedrock of Oxford clay from the Jurassic period. The land in the north of the parish is characterised as Oadby Member Diamicton, from the Quaternary period, with rocks formed during Ice Age conditions by glaciers scouring the land. The village lies between 55 feet (17 m) and 172 feet (52 m) above sea level.

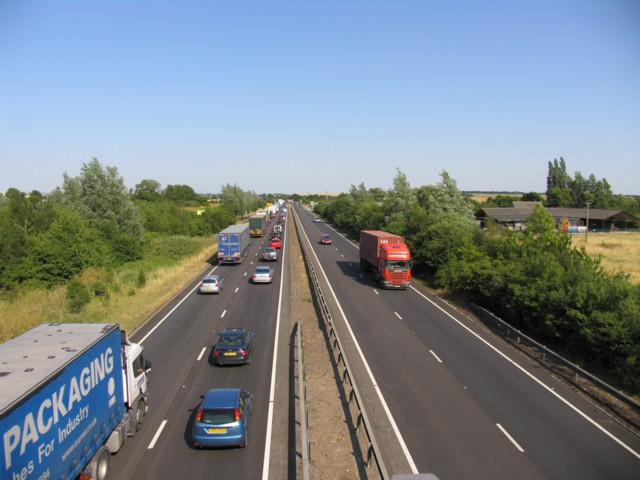
A14 north of Ellington - geograph.org.uk - 201293

The A14 road that runs from the Port of Felixstowe to the Catthorpe Interchange, Leicestershire passes through the north of the parish. Ellington village itself lies immediately to the south of Junction 20 of the A14 road. About 2 miles (3.2 km) south of the village is Grafham Water, which is a large reservoir with a circumference of approximately 10 miles (16 km). It is the eighth largest reservoir in England by volume and the third largest by area. Today the reservoir is mainly used by Grafham Water Sailing club and Grafham Water Activities Centre.

In 1932, Ellington was described as being a "curiously shaped parish" from information in the Victoria County History series. The article talks about the general shape of the village and how the shape of Ellington consists of the main village as well as a stretch of land to both the west and the south. It also describes a stream, The Ellington Brook, "That flows from east to west" defining Ellington's boundary on the west stretch of land. The stream also joins up to the Alconbury Brook East of the village which flows from the village of Spaldwick.

== Demographics ==
In the census of 2011, 96.1% of the people living in Ellington described themselves as white, 2.6% as having mixed or multiple ethnic groups, and 1.2% as being Asian or British Asian. In that same census, 65.3% described themselves as Christian, 24.1% described themselves as having no religion, 10.2% did not specify a religion, and 0.2% described themselves as having another religion. In 2011, of the 419 residents who were between the ages of 16 and 74, 67.1% were economically active (i.e. self-employed, in part–time or full–time employment), 28.9% were economically inactive (i.e. retired, a carer, a full–time student or long-term sick) and 2.9% were unemployed.

=== Historical Population ===
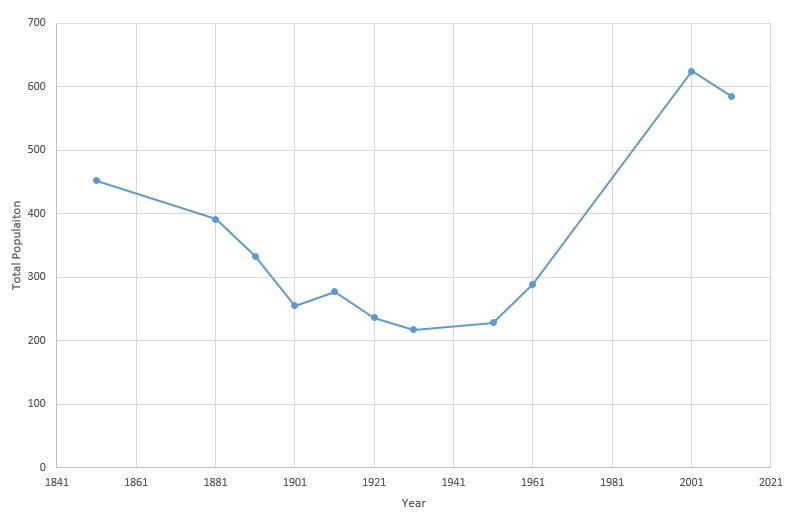
This graph displays the population of Ellington, Cambridgeshire from 1851 until 2011.

The graph (as pictured) from the census returns show that the population of Ellington, as reported in 1851 was around 450. It reached its lowest point in 1931 when the population of the parish dropped to just above 217 and since then the population of Ellington rose to 624 in 2001. The most recent census data from 2011 shows that there has been the first drop in the population figures in 100 years, since 1911.

=== Occupation and Employment ===
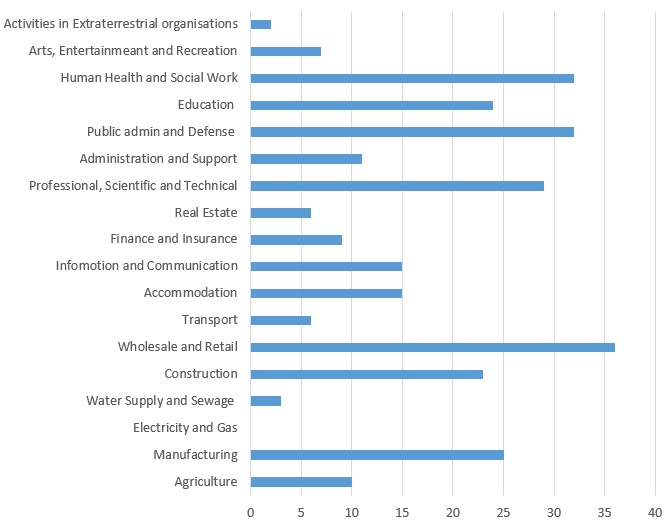
This chart shows the various disciplines of occupation for the population of Ellington in 2011, Cambridgeshire.

The chart showing occupational statistics reveals that "Wholesale and Retail" was the most dominant form of employment for the residents of Ellington in 2011. Other areas of employment that also had high rates are "Human Health and Social Work", "Public Administration and Defence", and "Professional, Scientific and Technically Skilled" employment.

The earliest occupational statistics of Ellington back in 1831 show the employment fields of the residents were quite different. The main area of employment for residents at that time was Agricultural Laboring which provided more than half of the employment. Retail and Handicrafts was also another popular area of employment in 1831.

== Culture and Community ==
Local amenities in Ellington include the village hall and the All Saints Church (pictured); furthermore there are playing fields including a football pitch, tennis courts and more recently updated playground.

The Mermaid Inn is a 17th-century public house that gets its name from the particular type of timber used for the skeleton of the building during construction; today the ancient beams are visible from the bar area and the dining room.

== Transport ==
Ellington lies just south of the A14 and 2 miles (3.2 km) from the junction with the A1 road, which southbound, leads directly to the M25 and London. The nearest railway station is 4 miles (6.4 km) away at Huntingdon which lies on the East Coast Main Line.

Major changes to the A14 nearby have been proposed in different schemes in recent years including one known as A14 Ellington Fen Ditton. In 2016 work began on the A14 Cambridge to Huntingdon improvement scheme, with completion expected 2021.

== Religious Sites ==
A church at Ellington is mentioned in the 1086 Domesday survey, although nothing earlier than the 13th Century remains. The Anglican church is dedicated to All Saints and is a Grade I listed building. Over the years the church has been changed and updated, such as the south aisle which was either altered or added around the 14th century period. Towards the end of the 14th century, it is believed that the tower was either added or rebuilt. The 16th century saw the construction of the south porch. The chancel was rebuilt in 1863, the spire restored in 1899 and the nave roof in 1907. Even though the church has been partly rebuilt, the church today is in good condition. The 15th-century roofs are still present and the carved timberwork supported by the figures of angels. There are four bells inside the tower which have been ringing for well over 300 years and continue to do so. All Saints, Ellington is in the deanery of Huntingdon in the diocese of Ely.

== Education ==
Ellington itself does not contain any schools within the parish. However, there are a number of schools within 5 miles of the parish. These include Spaldwick Primary (4–11 years) and Hinchingbrooke School in Huntingdon (11–18 years).
