= Shepherd's Close =

Nature reserve in Cambridgeshire, England

Coordinates: 52.323°N 0.339°W

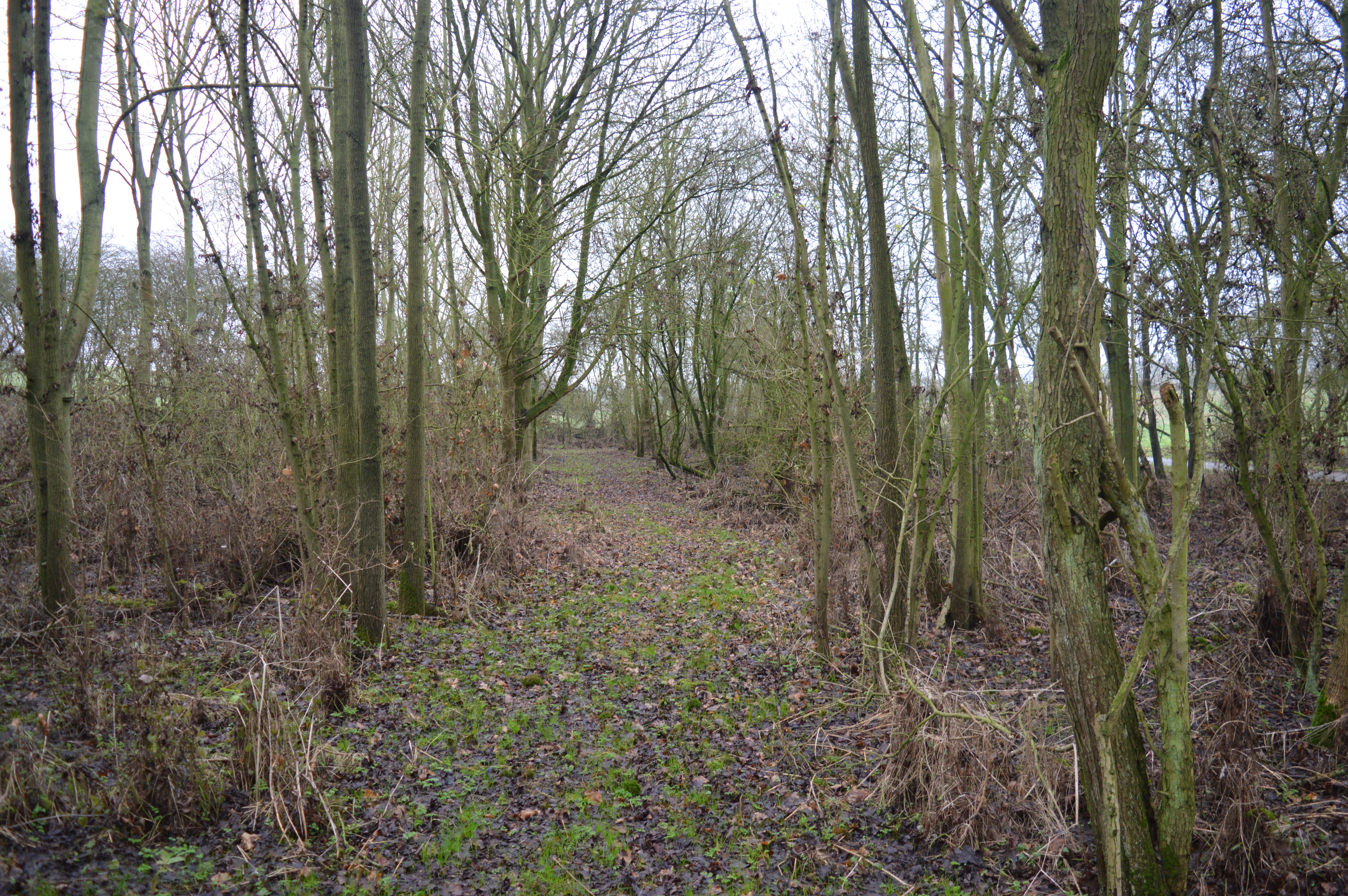
- Interactive map of Shepherd's Close
- Type: Nature reserve
- Location: Spaldwick, Cambridgeshire
- OS grid: TL 134 707
- Area: 1.2 hectares (3.0 acres)
- Manager: Wildlife Trust for Bedfordshire, Cambridgeshire and Northamptonshire

Shepherd's Close is a 1.2-hectare (3.0-acre) nature reserve south of Spaldwick in Cambridgeshire. It is managed by the Wildlife Trust for Bedfordshire, Cambridgeshire and Northamptonshire.

This small wood was planted in 1984 with ash, field maple and oak. Birds include blackcaps and chiffchaffs, and there are peacock, orange-tip and speckled wood butterflies.

There is access from Stonely Road.
