= Catthorpe =

Village and civil parish in England

Coordinates: 52.398°N 1.189°W

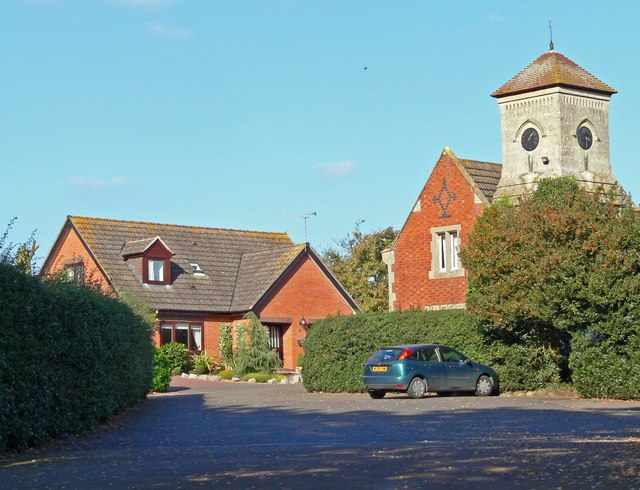
- Catthorpe Manor Clock Tower in October 2007

- Location within Leicestershire
- Population: 156 (2021)
- OS grid reference: SP552780
- Civil parish: Catthorpe
- District: Harborough
- Shire county: Leicestershire
- Region: East Midlands
- Country: England
- Sovereign state: United Kingdom
- Post town: LUTTERWORTH
- Postcode district: LE17
- Dialling code: 01788
- Police: Leicestershire
- Fire: Leicestershire
- Ambulance: East Midlands
- UK Parliament: South Leicestershire

Catthorpe is a village and civil parish in the Harborough district of Leicestershire, England. It is located beside the River Avon and close to the A5 road, and hence close to the tripoint at Dow Bridge formed by Leicestershire, Northamptonshire and Warwickshire; the nearest towns are Rugby, in Warwickshire, around 4 miles (6.4 km) to the southwest, and Lutterworth around 4 miles (6.4 km) to the north. At the 2001 Census, the parish had a population of 179, falling slightly to 173 at the 2011 census, further decreasing to 156 at the 2021 census.

The name 'Catthorpe' is made up of 'thorpe' meaning 'outlying farm/settlement' and 'Cat'. 'Cat' was probably added after Isabel le Cat and Simon Mallore donated the land to Leicester Abbey.

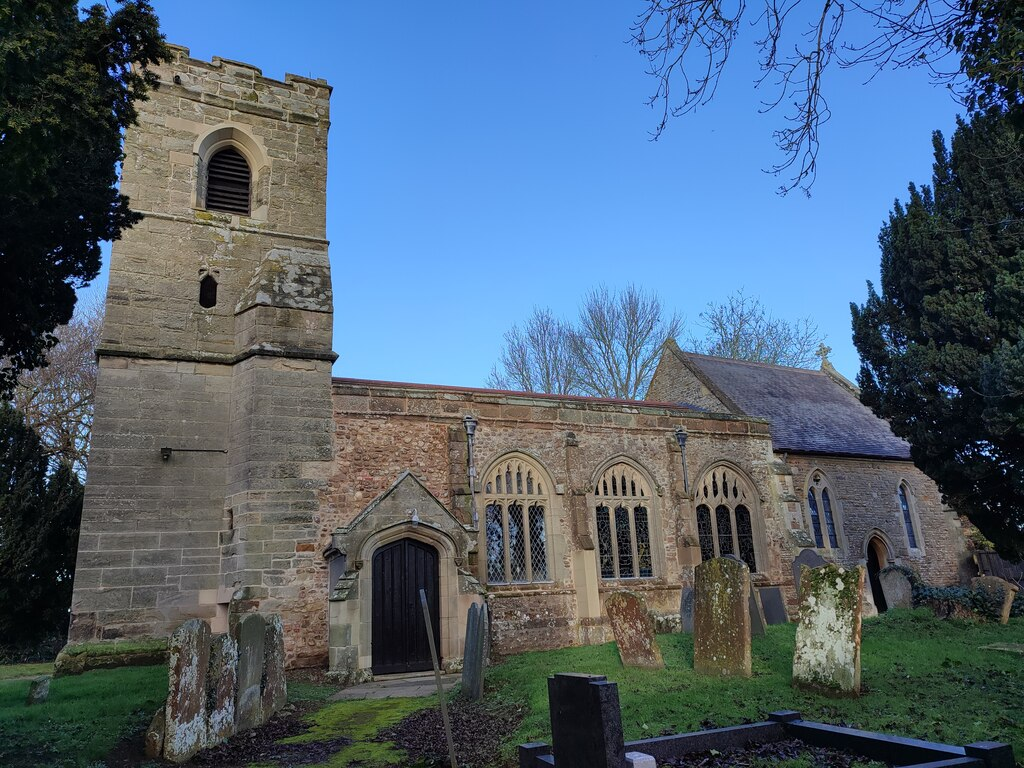
St Thomas' Church, Catthorpe

The parish church, dedicated to St Thomas, dates from the early 14th century and is Grade II* listed. It was restored in 1886, and underwent repairs in 2022 with help from the Heritage Stimulus Fund, as a result of which it has been removed from the Heritage at Risk Register.

There is a village pub called the Cherry Tree and a farm shop and restaurant, both located on Main Street.

Catthorpe gives its name to the nearby Catthorpe Interchange road junction formed by the M1 and M6 motorways and the A14 road, which was known to be regularly congested owing to its non-standard design. The A14 passed under both motorways; these underpasses were built in the 1960s for the former A427, which passed through Catthorpe. Between 2014 and 2016 the interchange was the subject of a major redesign to reduce the congestion and improve safety by providing free-flowing links and removing direct access from the local road network.

Between 1850 and 1966 Catthorpe was served by the nearby Lilbourne railway station on the now dismantled Rugby to Peterborough Line

Catthorpe came to national attention in 1999 when alleged war criminal Konrāds Kalējs was revealed to be living at Catthorpe Manor, a nursing home near the village run by the Latvian Welfare Trust. After the Home Secretary, Jack Straw, announced that moves would be made to deport Kalējs, he returned to Australia.
