= Maples baronets =

Extinct baronetcy in the Baronetage of England

The Maples Baronetcy, of Stow in the County of Huntingdon, was a title in the Baronetage of England. It was created on 30 May 1627 for Thomas Maples. The title became extinct on the death of the second Baronet some time before 1655.

== Maples baronets, of Stow (1627) ==
- Sir Thomas Maples, 1st Baronet (died 1635)
- Sir Thomas Maples, 2nd Baronet (died before 1655)
