= Easton, Cambridgeshire =

Village in Cambridgeshire, England

Coordinates: 52.3299°N 0.3358°W

Easton
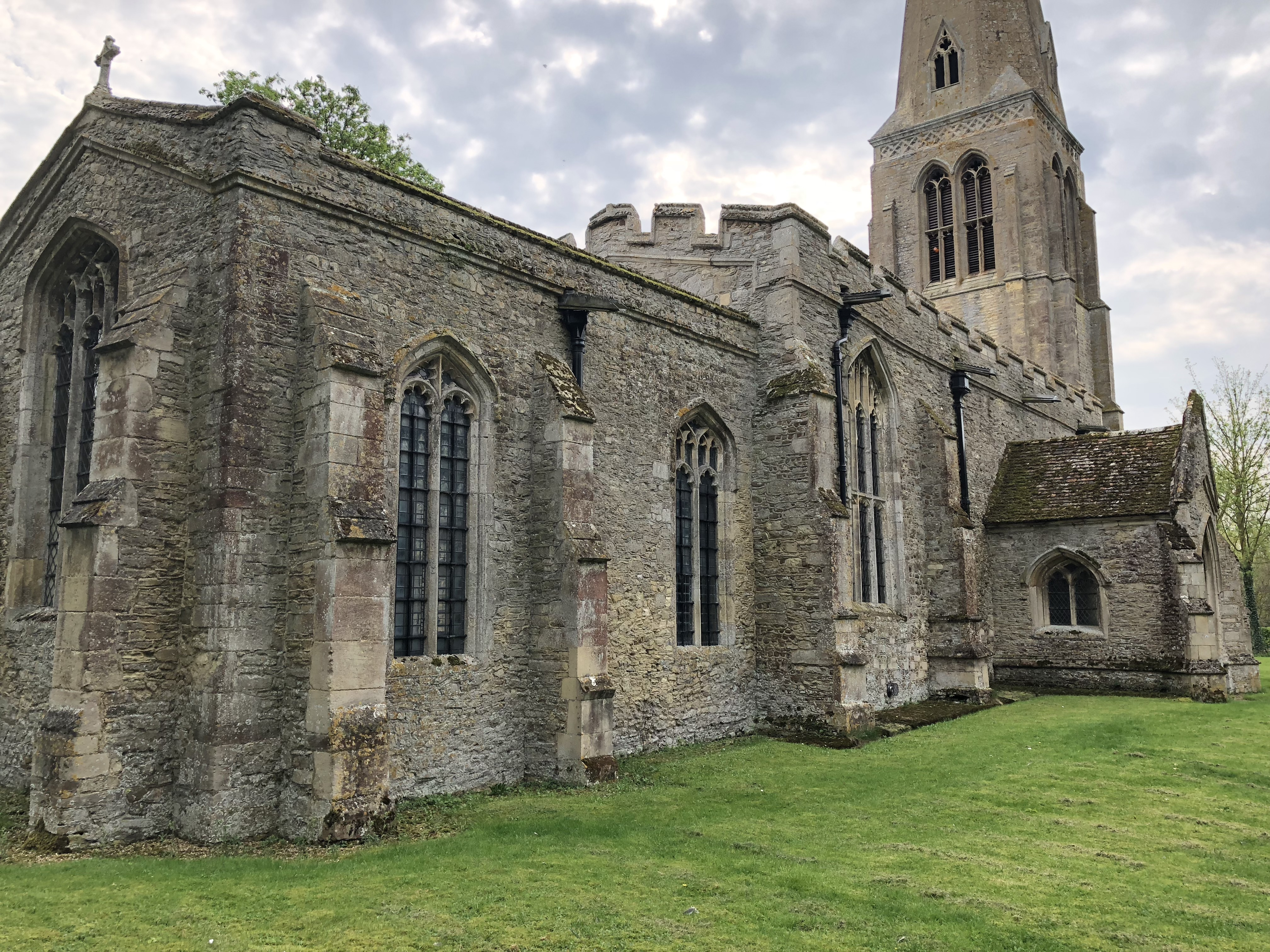
- St Peter's Church, Easton

- Location within Cambridgeshire
- Population: 169 (2011)
- OS grid reference: TL1371
- District: Huntingdonshire
- Shire county: Cambridgeshire
- Region: East
- Country: England
- Sovereign state: United Kingdom
- Post town: Huntingdon
- Postcode district: PE28
- Dialling code: 01480
- Police: Cambridgeshire
- Fire: Cambridgeshire
- Ambulance: East of England
- UK Parliament: North West Cambridgeshire
- Website: http://www.eastonpc.co.uk/

Easton is a village and civil parish in Cambridgeshire, England. Easton lies approximately 6 miles (10 km) west of Huntingdon, between the villages of Ellington and Spaldwick. Easton is situated within Huntingdonshire which is a non-metropolitan district of Cambridgeshire as well as being a historic county of England. Easton is a hamlet which the Anglo Saxons settled in.

== History ==
Easton is recorded in the Domesday Book of 1086 as a settlement consisting of ten manors, with 19.5 ploughlands (approximately 2,340 acres (950 hectares)) of arable land and 840 acres (340 hectares) of meadows. The village was a berewick of Spaldwick at the time, and was passed in 1109 to the Bishop of Lincoln as part of the appurtenances of Spaldwick. It later descended as part of the soke of Spaldwick and into the ownership of the Duke of Manchester.

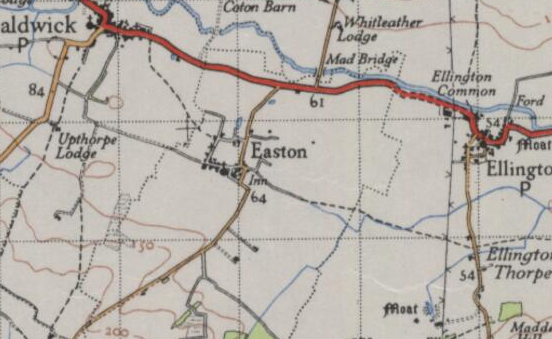
Map of Easton from the 20th Century from Ordnance Survey

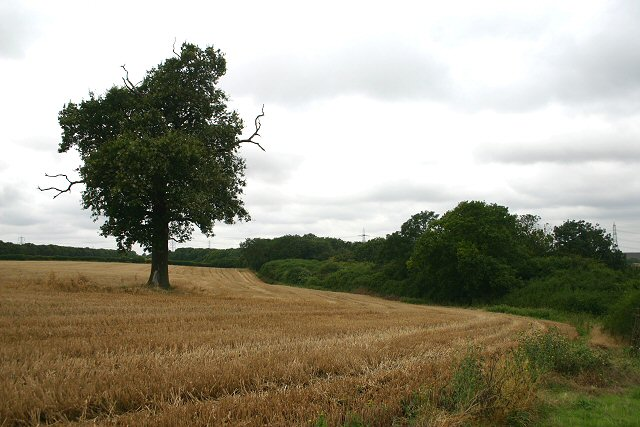
Calpher Wood, located west of the village Grafham and close to the reservoir.

The village's church, St Peter's, was built in the 11th Century, partially reconstructed in the 13th and 14th century and majorly rebuilt in 1781. A 14th century bell pit in the floor of the church's tower was uncovered in the 21st century. The church became a Grade I listed building in 1958.

== Socio-economic statistics ==
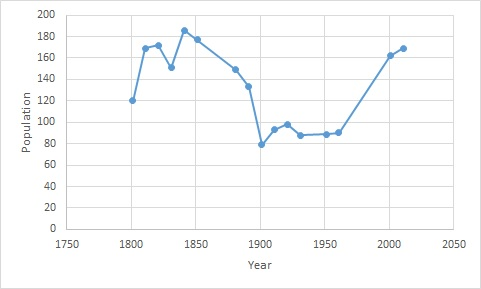
Population time series 1801–2011

=== Population ===
In 1801, the population of Easton was 120 people: 57 males and 63 females, drastically increasing to 172 people: 82 males and 90 females by 1821. The population then fluctuated for the next fifty years, peaking at 186 people: 95 males and 91 females in 1841 and lulling at 133 people: 70 males and 63 females in 1891. Only ten years later, by 1901, the population had dropped to only 79 people: 42 males and 37 females before increasing again to 93 people: 45 males and 48 females in 1911 and remaining between a population of 93 to 98 people until 1961. At the time of the 2001 census, the parish's population had greatly increased to 162: 80 males and 82 females across 60 households. However, by 2011, the population had increased only slightly to 169 people: 83 males and 86 females across 65 households.

==== Population Density ====
In 1880, the population density of Easton was 0.125 people per hectare, dropping to 0.0625 people per hectare in 1900 where it remained fairly constant until 1960. However, by 2001, the population density had increased to 0.3 people per hectare and remained the same until 2011.

==== Age structure ====
In 2001, almost half, 49%, of Easton's residents were in the 30–59 years age bracket, with 39 people aged 30–44 and 39 people aged 45–59. Additionally, there were 7 people aged 55, 7 people aged 51 and 7 people aged 53, making these individual ages dominant within the Parish. However, by 2011, residents ages became more diverse as the majority were aged 45–59, 25.4% of the total population. Furthermore, Easton had a mean age of 44.2 years, above both Huntingdonshire's average age of 39.9 years and the national average age of 39.3 years showing Easton as having a slightly older population in comparison.

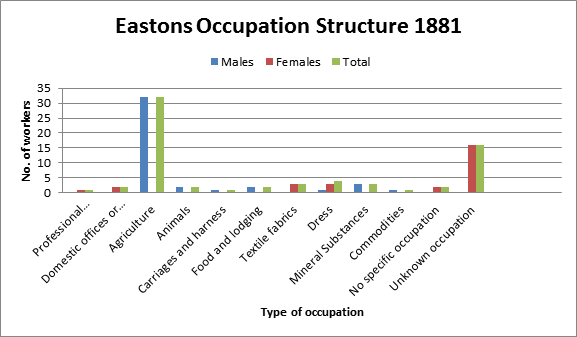
Easton Occupation Structure 1881

=== Occupation ===
In 1881, male and female occupations drastically differentiated as 16 males worked in Agriculture and 16 females worked in Unknown Occupations. Therefore, Agriculture was the most popular occupation for males and Textile Fabrics / Dress was the most popular known occupation for females as it provided them with 6 jobs.

This contrasts to leading occupations in 2001 as 23 males were Managers and Senior Officials, and 13 females worked in Administrative and Secretarial occupations making them the most popular sectors. By 2011, the number of male Managers and senior officials had dropped to 16, but it remained their most popular occupation. Similarly, the number of females occupied by Administrative and Secretarial jobs had also decreased, to 6, but it was no longer the most popular occupation as the number of female Professionals increased to 9, making being a Professional the most popular occupation in 2011.

=== Housing ===
In 1831, 36 houses in Easton were occupied with no vacant houses in the area. However, by 1851, 36 houses remained occupied, with 7 vacant and 2 under construction. This reflects the population increase of 35 people between 1831 and 1841, and so the data indicates the Parish may have been constructing new homes to cater for the influx of people. By 1901, the figures had dropped to the lowest point with only 21 occupied houses and 5 vacant which once again reflects the decrease in population as it drops from 133 residents to just 79. However, twenty years later in 1921, the number of occupied houses had increase again reaching 25 households. This figure fluctuated between 25 and 32 houses occupied up until 1961.

By 2001, the number of households in Easton had almost doubled with 60 occupied houses. There were 3 additional unoccupied houses which were only unoccupied as they were holiday homes or second residency homes.

== Government ==
Easton was in the historic and administrative county of Huntingdonshire until 1965. From 1965, the village was part of the new administrative county of Huntingdon and Peterborough. Then in 1974, following the Local Government Act 1972, Easton became a part of the county of Cambridgeshire.

For Easton the highest tier of local government is Cambridgeshire County Council. Easton is part of the electoral division of Sawtry and Ellington and is represented on the county council by one councillor. The second tier of local government is Huntingdonshire District Council, a non-metropolitan district of Cambridgeshire. Easton is a part of the district ward of Ellington and is represented on the district council by one councillor. At Westminster Easton is in the parliamentary constituency of North West Cambridgeshire, and has been represented in the House of Commons by Shailesh Vara (Conservative) since 2005.
