= Bythorn and Keyston =

Civil parish in Cambridgeshire, England

Coordinates: 52.37°N 0.43°W

- Location within Cambridgeshire
- Population: 316 (2011 Census)
- OS grid reference: TL066754
- District: Huntingdonshire
- Shire county: Cambridgeshire
- Region: East
- Country: England
- Sovereign state: United Kingdom
- Post town: Huntingdon
- Postcode district: PE28

Bythorn and Keyston is a civil parish in the Huntingdonshire district of Cambridgeshire, England. According to the 2001 census the parish had a population of 271, increasing to 316 at the 2011 Census.

The parish was formed in 1935 by the merger of the parishes of Bythorn and Keyston. Now the A14 runs through the parish separating them as two different villages.

== Demography ==
=== Population ===
In the period 1801 to 1901 the populations of the two separate parishes of Bythorn and of Keyston were recorded every ten years by the UK census. During this time the population was in the range of 283 (the lowest was in 1901) and 515 (the highest was in 1861).

From 1901, a census was taken every ten years with the exception of 1941 (due to the Second World War).

Parish	1911	1921	1931	1951	1961	1971	1981	1991	2001	2011
Bythorn	148	144	129							
Keyston	181	182	151							
Bythorn and Keyston	329	326	280	268	244	259	252	250	271	316

All population census figures from report Historic Census figures Cambridgeshire to 2011 by Cambridgeshire Insight.

In 2011, the parish covered an area of 4,250 acres (1,720 hectares) and so the population density for Bythorn and Keyston in 2011 was 47.6 persons per square mile (18.4 per square kilometre).
