= Stratton Hall =

Civil parish in Suffolk, England

Coordinates: 52.003°N 1.268°E

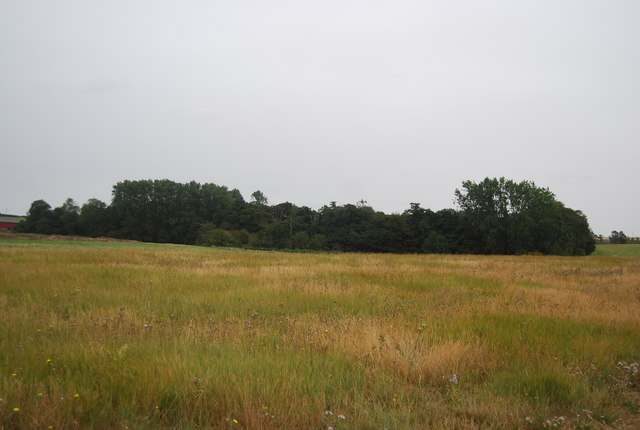
- Stratton Hall Wood

- Location within Suffolk
- Population: 30 (2005)
- Civil parish: Stratton Hall
- District: East Suffolk
- Shire county: Suffolk
- Region: East
- Country: England
- Sovereign state: United Kingdom
- Post town: Ipswich
- Postcode district: IP10
- Police: Suffolk
- Fire: Suffolk
- Ambulance: East of England
- UK Parliament: Suffolk Coastal

Stratton Hall is a civil parish in the East Suffolk district of Suffolk in eastern England. In 2005 its population was 30. It shares a parish council with nearby Levington. Stratton once had a church. From 1974 to 2019 it was in Suffolk Coastal district.
