= Keyston =

Village in Cambridgeshire, England

Coordinates: 52.35°N 0.47°W

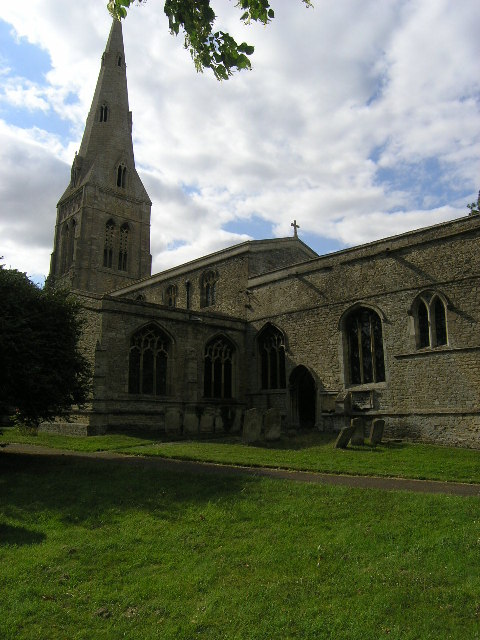
- St John the Baptist's Church

- Location within Cambridgeshire
- OS grid reference: TL044735
- Civil parish: Bythorn and Keyston
- District: Huntingdonshire
- Shire county: Cambridgeshire
- Region: East
- Country: England
- Sovereign state: United Kingdom
- Post town: HUNTINGDON
- Postcode district: PE28
- Dialling code: 01832
- Police: Cambridgeshire
- Fire: Cambridgeshire
- Ambulance: East of England
- UK Parliament: North West Cambridgeshire

Keyston is a village and former civil parish, now in the parish of Bythorn and Keyston, in Cambridgeshire, England. Keyston lies approximately 12 miles (19 km) west of Huntingdon, near Molesworth. Keyston is situated within Huntingdonshire which is a non-metropolitan district of Cambridgeshire as well as being a historic county of England. In 1931 the parish had a population of 151.

The village lies at the western end of Huntingdonshire and the parish's western border coincides with the Cambridgeshire county boundary with Northamptonshire. The village is built around the brook that runs through its centre with the brook at about 148 feet (45 m) above sea-level.

Known as Chetelestan in the Domesday Book, the name Keyston means "Boundary stone of a man called Ketil". By the 13th century it was known as Keston, and Keyston from the 16th century.

== History ==
In 1085 William the Conqueror ordered that a survey should be carried out across his kingdom to discover who owned which parts and what it was worth. The survey took place in 1086 and the results were recorded in what, since the 12th century, has become known as the Domesday Book. Starting with the king himself, for each landholder within a county there is a list of their estates or manors; and, for each manor, there is a summary of the resources of the manor, the amount of annual rent that was collected by the lord of the manor both in 1066 and in 1086, together with the taxable value.

Keyston was listed in the Domesday Book in the Hundred of Leightonstone in Huntingdonshire; the name of the settlement was written as Chetelestan and Ketelestan in the Domesday Book. In 1086 there was just one manor at Keyston; the annual rent paid to the lord of the manor in 1066 had been £10 and the rent was the same in 1086.

The Domesday Book does not explicitly detail the population of a place but it records that there were 32 households at Keyston. There is no consensus about the average size of a household at that time; estimates range from 3.5 to 5.0 people per household. Using these figures then an estimate of the population of Keyston in 1086 is that it was within the range of 112 and 160 people.

The Domesday Book uses a number of units of measure for areas of land that are now unfamiliar terms, such as hides and ploughlands. In different parts of the country, these were terms for the area of land that a team of eight oxen could plough in a single season and are equivalent to 120 acres (49 hectares); this was the amount of land that was considered to be sufficient to support a single family. By 1086, the hide had become a unit of tax assessment rather than an actual land area; a hide was the amount of land that could be assessed as £1 for tax purposes. The survey records that there were twelve ploughlands at Keyston in 1086. In addition to the arable land, there was 86 acres (35 hectares) of meadows and 75 acres (30 hectares) of woodland at Keyston.

The tax assessment in the Domesday Book was known as geld or danegeld and was a type of land-tax based on the hide or ploughland. It was originally a way of collecting a tribute to pay off the Danes when they attacked England, and was only levied when necessary. Following the Norman conquest, the geld was used to raise money for the king and to pay for continental wars; by 1130, the geld was being collected annually. Having determined the value of a manor's land and other assets, a tax of so many shillings and pence per pound of value would be levied on the land holder. While this was typically two shillings in the pound the amount did vary; for example, in 1084 it was as high as six shillings in the pound. For the manor at Keyston the total tax assessed was 4 geld.

In 1086 there was no church at Keyston.

The poet John Donne was granted the living to the Rectory in 1616.

== Government ==
The civil parish of Keyston was abolished on 1 April 1935 in creating the larger parish of "Bythorn and Keyston", and the ecclesiastical parish followed a year later. Bythorn and Keyston has a parish council which is elected by the residents of the parish who have registered on the electoral roll; the parish council is the lowest tier of government in England. A parish council is responsible for providing and maintaining a variety of local services including allotments and a cemetery; grass cutting and tree planting within public open spaces such as a village green or playing fields. The parish council reviews all planning applications that might affect the parish and makes recommendations to Huntingdonshire District Council, which is the local planning authority for the parish. The parish council also represents the views of the parish on issues such as local transport, policing and the environment. The parish council raises its own tax to pay for these services, known as the parish precept, which is collected as part of the Council Tax. The parish council has three councillors.

Keyston was in the historic and administrative county of Huntingdonshire until 1965. From 1965, the village was part of the new administrative county of Huntingdon and Peterborough. Then in 1974, following the Local Government Act 1972, Keyston became a part of the county of Cambridgeshire.

The second tier of local government is Huntingdonshire District Council which is a non-metropolitan district of Cambridgeshire and has its headquarters in Huntingdon. Huntingdonshire District Council has 52 councillors representing 29 district wards. Huntingdonshire District Council collects the council tax, and provides services such as building regulations, local planning, environmental health, leisure and tourism. Keyston is a part of the district ward of Ellington and is represented on the district council by one councillor. District councillors serve for four-year terms following elections to Huntingdonshire District Council.

For Keyston the highest tier of local government is Cambridgeshire County Council which has administration buildings in Cambridge. The county council provides county-wide services such as major road infrastructure, fire and rescue, education, social services, libraries and heritage services. Cambridgeshire County Council consists of 69 councillors representing 60 electoral divisions. Keyston is part of the electoral division of Sawtry and Ellington and is represented on the county council by one councillor.

At Westminster Keyston is in the parliamentary constituency of North West Cambridgeshire, and elects one Member of Parliament (MP) by the first past the post system of election. Keyston is represented in the House of Commons by Shailesh Vara (Conservative). Shailesh Vara has represented the constituency since 2005. The previous member of parliament was Brian Mawhinney (Conservative) who represented the constituency between 1997 and 2005.

== Demography ==
=== Population ===
In the period 1801 to 1901 the population of Keyston was recorded every ten years by the UK census. During this time the population was in the range of 175 (the lowest was in 1901) and 237 (the highest was in 1881).

From 1901, a census was taken every ten years with the exception of 1941 (due to the Second World War).

Parish	1911	1921	1931	1951	1961	1971	1981	1991	2001	2011
Bythorn	148	144	129							
Keyston	181	182	151							
Bythorn and Keyston	329	326	280	268	244	259	252	250	271	316

All population census figures from report Historic Census figures Cambridgeshire to 2011 by Cambridgeshire Insight.

== Church ==
The village church of St John the Baptist dates from the 13th century, with the present nave and aisles having been built in around 1250. The chancel followed in around 1280 and the tower in around 1300. It is a Grade I listed building. Church records, dating from 1637 to 1994, are held by Huntingdonshire Archives.

The church is known for its oak cadaver, a memorial consisting of a wooden skeleton taken from a 15th-century tomb, and one of only two such carvings in the country. The baptismal font has a modern bowl on a 13th-century base and plinth. The original bowl was found in the rectory garden in the 1890s, and now stands separately in the south aisle. The first pew on the right, on entering the church, is carved with the date 1608.

The church is part of the West Leightonstone benefice, in the deanery of Huntingdon, the archdeaconry of Huntingdon & Wisbech and the Diocese of Ely. Since 2008 the site has become a roosting site for Natterer's bats, a species protected under the Wildlife and Countryside Act 1981. Their presence highlights the church's commitment to ecological concerns, but also necessitates thorough cleaning before services and ceremonies, to ensure a suitable environment for worship.

=== Bells ===
The Victoria County History records details of the bells' inscriptions and history as follows: "Feare the Lorde 1592; William Marks churchwarden I, Eayre fecit. 1743 gloria Deo soli Francis [?] Clitherow Esquire; Remember the ende 1592; Give God the praise 1592. Thomas Rvssell of Wootton near X Bedford made me in 1733 Thomas Simonts churchwarden; The first, third and fourth are by Watts of Leicester. In 1552 there were four bells and a sanctus bell. By about 1709 there were five bells but whether this includes the sanctus bell is not clear".

== Culture and community ==
The village has a public house, the Pheasant. Keyston also has a small airfield.
