= Catworth =

Village and civil parish in England

Coordinates: 52.348°N 0.407°W

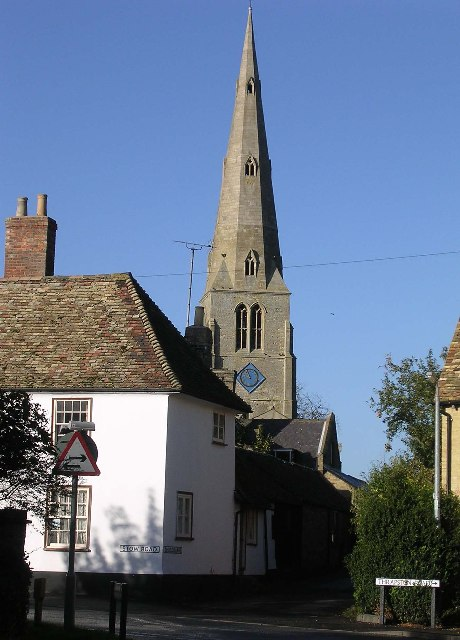
- Spaldwick and its church

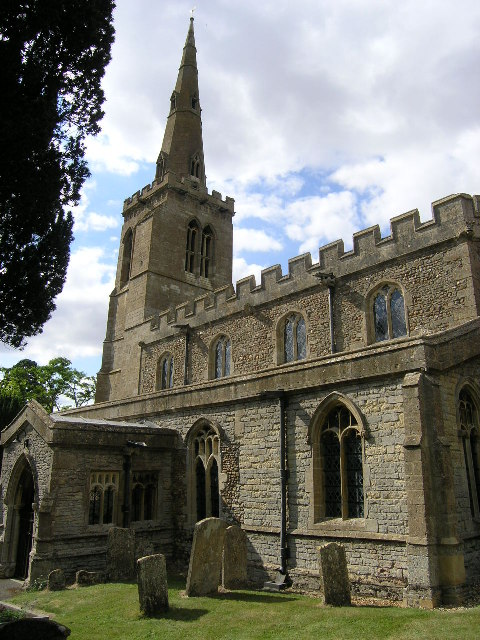
- St Leonard's Church

- Location within Cambridgeshire
- Population: 347 (2011)
- OS grid reference: TL090718
  - London: 58 miles (93 km)
- District: Huntingdonshire
- Shire county: Cambridgeshire
- Region: East
- Country: England
- Sovereign state: United Kingdom
- Post town: Huntingdon
- Postcode district: PE28
- Dialling code: 01480
- Police: Cambridgeshire
- Fire: Cambridgeshire
- Ambulance: East of England
- UK Parliament: North West Cambridgeshire

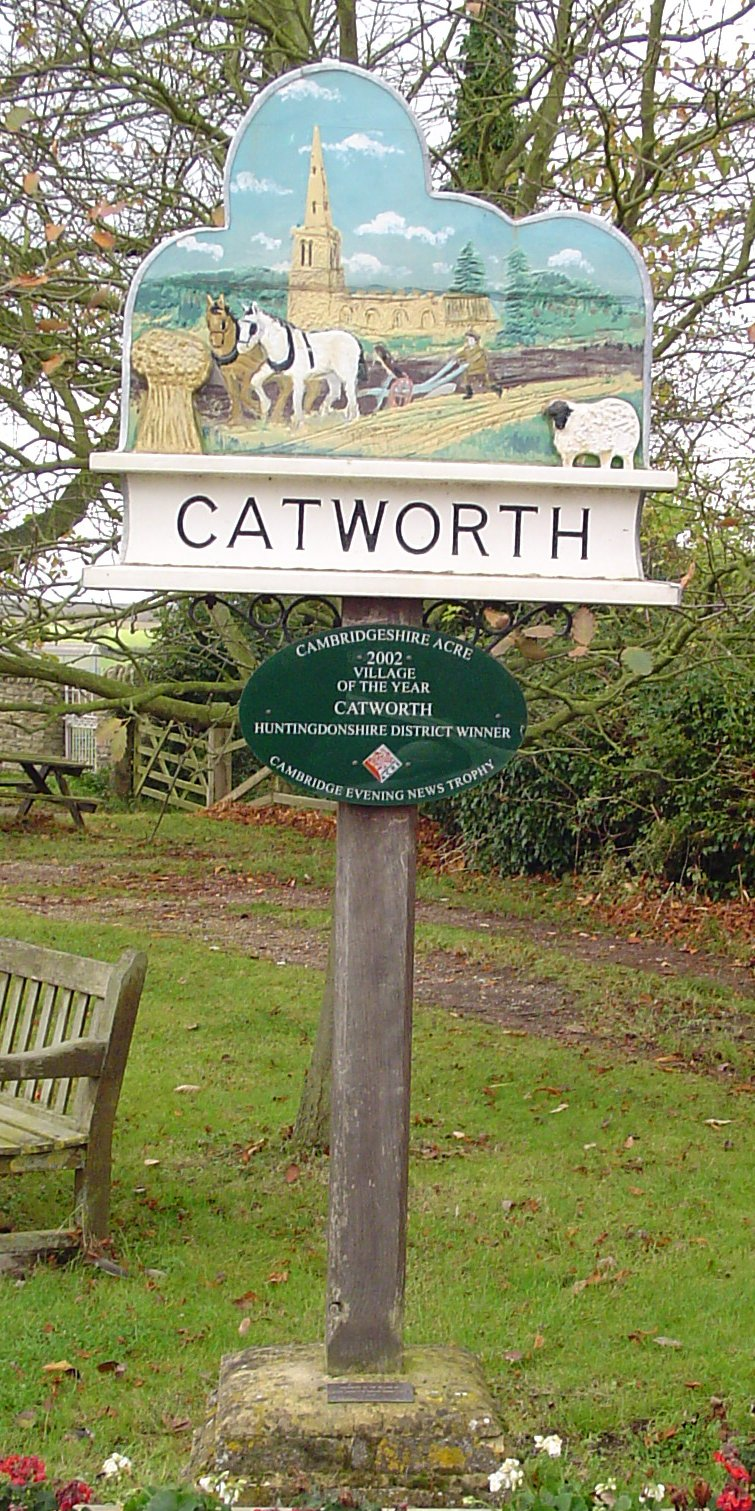
Village sign in Catworth

Catworth is a village and civil parish in Cambridgeshire, England. Catworth lies approximately 9 miles (14 km) west of Huntingdon. The civil parish covers an area of 3,094 acres (1,252 hectares). Catworth village has two parts, Catworth, at the top of the hill, and Little Catworth, at the bottom. Catworth is situated within Huntingdonshire which is a non-metropolitan district of Cambridgeshire as well as being a historic county of England.

== History ==
In 1085, William the Conqueror ordered that a survey should be carried out across his kingdom to discover who owned which parts and what it was worth. The survey took place in 1086 and the results were recorded in what, since the 12th century, has become known as the Domesday Book. Starting with the king himself, for each landholder within a county there is a list of their estates or manors; and, for each manor, there is a summary of the resources of the manor, the amount of annual rent that was collected by the lord of the manor both in 1066 and in 1086, together with the taxable value.

Catworth was listed in the Domesday Book in the Hundred of Navisford in Northamptonshire; the name of the settlement was written as Cateworde in the Domesday Book. In 1086, there were five manors at Catworth; the annual rent paid to the lords of the manors in 1066 had been £7.5 and the rent had fallen to £6.75 in 1086.

The Domesday Book does not explicitly detail the population of a place but it records that there were 34 households at Catworth. There is no consensus about the average size of a household at that time; estimates range from 3.5 to 5.0 people per household. Using these figures then an estimate of the population of Catworth in 1086 is that it was within the range of 119 and 170 people.

The Domesday Book uses a number of units of measure for areas of land that are now unfamiliar terms, such as hides and ploughlands. In different parts of the country, these were terms for the area of land that a team of eight oxen could plough in a single season and are equivalent to 120 acres (49 hectares); this was the amount of land that was considered to be sufficient to support a single family. By 1086, the hide had become a unit of tax assessment rather than an actual land area; a hide was the amount of land that could be assessed as £1 for tax purposes. The survey records that there were 10.62 ploughlands at Catworth in 1086 and that there was the capacity for a further 5.38 ploughlands. In addition to the arable land, there were 10 acres (4 hectares) of meadows, 6 acres (2 hectares) of woodland and a water mill at Catworth.

The tax assessment in the Domesday Book was known as geld or danegeld and was a type of land-tax based on the hide or ploughland. It was originally a way of collecting a tribute to pay off the Danes when they attacked England, and was only levied when necessary. Following the Norman Conquest, the geld was used to raise money for the King and to pay for continental wars; by 1130, the geld was being collected annually. Having determined the value of a manor's land and other assets, a tax of so many shillings and pence per pound of value would be levied on the land holder. While this was typically two shillings in the pound (10%) the amount did vary; for example, in 1084 it was as high as six shillings in the pound (30%). For the manors at Catworth the total tax assessed was 11.5 geld.

Little Catworth was also listed in the Domesday Book in the Hundred of Leightonstone in Huntingdonshire; the name of the settlement was written as alia Cateworde and parva Cateworde in the Domesday Book. There were two manors at Little Catworth and the annual rent paid to the lords of the manors was £1.5 in 1086. There were eight households at Little Catworth. The estimate of the population of Little Catworth in 1086 is that it was within the range of 28 and 40 people. The survey records that there were three ploughlands at Little Catworth in 1086 and that there was the capacity for a further two ploughlands. In addition to the arable land, there were 12 acres (5 hectares) of meadows at Little Catworth. For the manors at Little Catworth the total tax assessed was 5 geld.

In 1086, there was no church recorded at Catworth or Little Catworth.

Between 1645 and 1646, a number of women in Catworth were accused of being witches in a witch-hunt conducted by the so-called Witchfinder General, Matthew Hopkins.

Little Catworth Inclosure Act 1780
- Act of Parliament
- Parliament of Great Britain
- Long title: An Act for dividing and enclosing the Common and Open Fields, Meadows, Commonable Lands and Waste Grounds in Little Catworth, in the County of Huntingdon.
- Citation: 20 Geo. 3. c. 62 Pr.
- Territorial extent: Great Britain

Dates
- Royal assent: 3 July 1780
- Commencement: 25 November 1779 (Note: Start of session.)

Status: Current legislation

Great Catworth Inclosure Act 1795
- Act of Parliament
- Parliament of Great Britain
- Long title: An act for dividing and inclosing the open and common fields, meadows, lands, commons, and commonable places, within the parish of Great Catworth, in the counties of Huntingdon and Northampton.
- Citation: 35 Geo. 3. c. 24 Pr.
- Territorial extent: Great Britain

Dates
- Royal assent: 27 March 1795
- Commencement: 27 March 1795 (Note: The Acts of Parliament (Commencement) Act 1793.)

Status: Current legislation

The enclosure of open fields took place in 1801. In 1885, the village of Great Catworth and the hamlet of Little Catworth were merged into a single civil parish called Catworth.

== Governance ==
As a civil parish, Catworth has a parish council. The parish council is elected by the residents of the parish who have registered on the electoral roll; the parish council is the lowest tier of government in England. A parish council is responsible for providing and maintaining a variety of local services including allotments and a cemetery; grass cutting and tree planting within public open spaces such as a village green or playing fields. The parish council reviews all planning applications that might affect the parish and makes recommendations to Huntingdonshire District Council, which is the local planning authority for the parish. The parish council also represents the views of the parish on issues such as local transport, policing and the environment. The parish council raises its own tax to pay for these services, known as the parish precept, which is collected as part of the Council Tax. The parish council at Catworth has seven members.

Catworth was in the historic and administrative county of Huntingdonshire until 1965. From 1965, the village was part of the new administrative county of Huntingdon and Peterborough. Then in 1974, following the Local Government Act 1972, Catworth became a part of the county of Cambridgeshire.

The second tier of local government is Huntingdonshire District Council which is a non-metropolitan district of Cambridgeshire and has its headquarters in Huntingdon. Huntingdonshire District Council has 52 councillors representing 29 district wards. Huntingdonshire District Council collects the council tax, and provides services such as building regulations, local planning, environmental health, leisure and tourism. Catworth is a part of the district ward of Ellington and is represented on the district council by one councillor. District councillors serve for four-year terms following elections to Huntingdonshire District Council.

For Catworth the highest tier of local government is Cambridgeshire County Council which has administration buildings in Cambridge. The county council provides county-wide services such as major road infrastructure, fire and rescue, education, social services, libraries and heritage services. Cambridgeshire County Council consists of 69 councillors representing 60 electoral divisions. Catworth is part of the electoral division of Sawtry and Ellington and is represented on the county council by one councillor.

At Westminster Catworth is in the parliamentary constituency of North West Cambridgeshire, and elects one Member of Parliament (MP) by the first past the post system of election. Catworth is represented in the House of Commons by Shailesh Vara (Conservative). Shailesh Vara has represented the constituency since 2005. The previous member of parliament was Brian Mawhinney (Conservative) who represented the constituency between 1997 and 2005.

== Geography ==
The village and parish lie on a bedrock of Oxford clay from the Jurassic period. The land in the north of the parish is characterised as Oadby Member Diamicton, from the Quaternary period, with rocks formed during Ice Age conditions by glaciers scouring the land.

Catworth is situated on the B660 between Kimbolton and Thrapston. The village lies between 100 feet (30 m) and 250 feet (76 m) above sea level. Catworth is surrounded by farms.

== Demography ==
The population of the village was recorded at 366 living in 137 households in the 2001 census. The population had decreased slightly to 347 in 146 households in the 2011 census. In the census of 2011, 98.2% of people described themselves as white, 1.2% as having mixed or multiple ethnic groups, and 0.6% as being Asian or British Asian In that same census, 66.9% described themselves as Christian, 23.3% described themselves as having no religion, 9.2% did not specify a religion, and 0.6% described themselves as having another religion.

=== Historical population ===
The population of Catworth between 1801 and 1901 ranged from 386 to 637.

Village	1911	1921	1931	1951	1961	1971	1991	2001	2011
Catworth	420	384	318	273	262	221	298	366	347

Census: Catworth 1801–1931, 1961 Census: Catworth 1951, 1971, 1991 Census: Catworth 2001, 2011

== Culture and community ==
There was public house with B&B in Catworth called The Racehorse which closed in 2017. The Wagon and Horses public house was open by the mid 19th century and closed in the 20th century. The Catworth Post Office closed in 2008, but a mobile Post Office van visits Catworth on three days a week. There are a number of businesses in the village including a service station.

The Catworth Football Club, which was founded in 1937, play on the village playing field where there is also a tennis court. The Catworth Bowls Club plays at the Village Hall. There are a number of other active community groups including Art, Amateur Dramatics, Cinema and Family History societies in Catworth.

== Transport ==
Catworth is about 0.5 miles (0.80 km) to the south of Junction 16 of the A14 road that runs from the Port of Felixstowe to the M1 and M6 motorways at Catthorpe Interchange, Leicestershire.

== Religious sites ==
The Anglican church at Catworth is dedicated to St Leonard and is a Grade I listed building. The church is in the deanery of Huntingdon in the diocese of Ely. There was no mention of a church in Catworth in the Domesday Book, but by the middle of the 13th Century a stone church had been built on the present site. The church was extended in the 14th century and in the 15th century. The church was restored in 1876. On 1 July 1914 the spire was struck by lightning, and the roof was restored in 1925. The church tower has four bells and has had a clock since 1709. In the 19th Century, there was a Methodist Chapel and a Baptist Chapel in Catworth.

== Notable people ==
Wolstan Dixie, Lord Mayor of London in 1585, was born to Thomas Dixie and Anne Jepson who lived in Catworth. Sir Felix Booth, distiller of gin and promoter of arctic exploration, had a house at Brook End, about a quarter of a mile from Catworth.
