= Catthorpe Interchange =

Major road junction in central England

Location
- Catthorpe, Leicestershire
- Coordinates: 52°24′03″N 01°10′32″W
- Roads at junction: M1; M6; A14

Construction
- Type: Three-level stack interchange
- Constructed: 2014-2016 (reconstruction) by Skanska/Jacobs
- Opened: 1994
- Maintained by: National Highways

Location in Leicestershire
Location in UK motorway network

The Catthorpe Interchange is a major intersection at the southern end of the M6, the western end of the A14 and junction 19 of the M1 near the village of Catthorpe in Leicestershire, England. It was developed in 1994 when the link to the A14 was added to the pre-existing M1/M6 junction by joining the M1, M6 and A14 to the country lane between Catthorpe and Swinford as part of the Trans European Road Network,.

As of December 2019, the interchange handled over 157,000 vehicles per day. Prior to reconfiguration in 2014, the previous layout was overloaded and had a poor safety record, meaning improvements were required. Traffic attempting to avoid the interchange caused congestion and nuisance in nearby towns and villages. The Highways Agency acknowledged that the layout of the interchange resulted in a serious accident problem, inconvenience for those wishing to travel between villages in the area, and delays and congestion for both motorway and non-motorway traffic. In January 2014, the work on upgrading the junction to a new free-flowing layout began. The final phase, the local link road, was opened to traffic on 22 December 2016.

== History ==
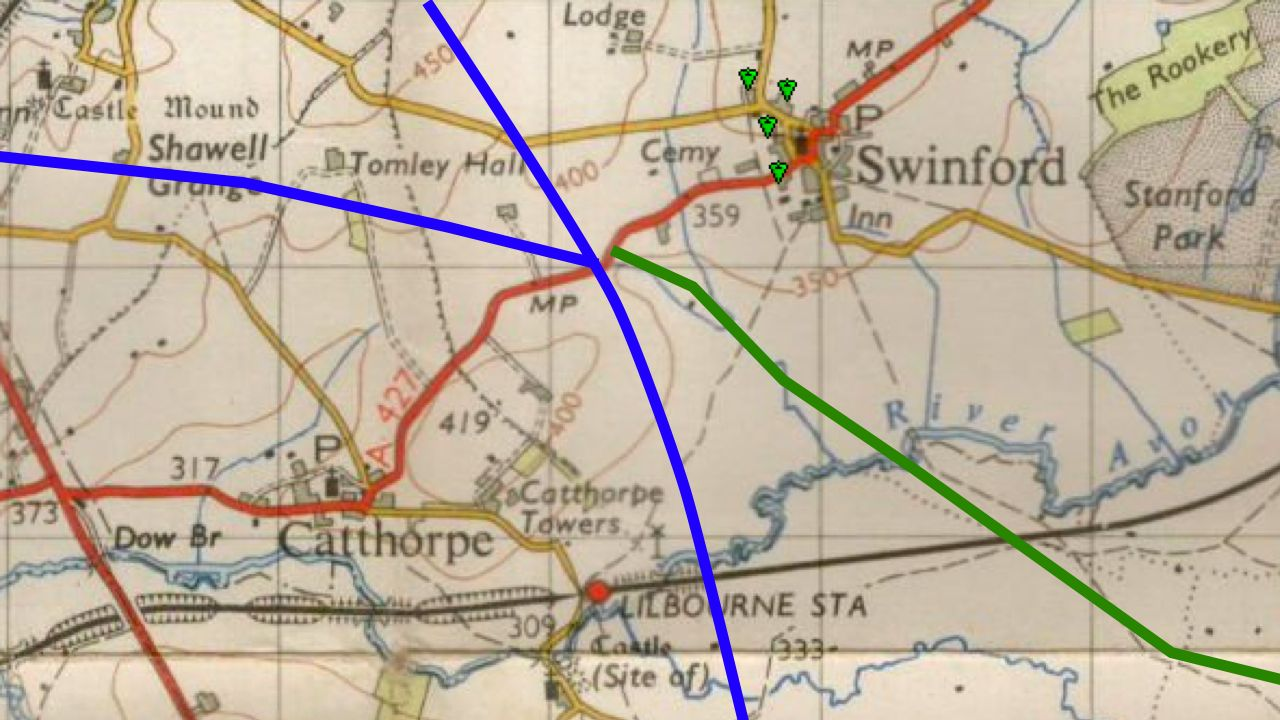
1940s map showing alignment of A427 overlaid with current roads

Although references to the Catthorpe Interchange started to appear from the mid-1970s, the interchange was only formally created in 1994 to join the newly established A14 trunk road with the existing M1 and M6 motorways. A non-standard layout was adopted and a sub-standard dumb-bell roundabout was created to handle the A14 traffic, and which became grossly inadequate before 2010. Prior to the junction with the A14 being created, there was a simple fork junction, opened in 1971, joining the M6 to the M1. At that stage traffic from Birmingham on the M6 wishing to travel north and east left the M6 at junction 1 to join the A426 road.

The interchange had been grossly overloaded. In the five years prior to March 2010, more than twelve people were killed and many more seriously injured in crashes at the interchange.

== M1 Jct 19 Improvement Scheme ==
By 1998 the government recognised that the intersection was a bottleneck in the strategic highway network and suffering serious safety and congestion problems. In March 2005 the contract for the planning, design, management and construction of the scheme through the Statutory Procedures from preparation of draft Orders to completion of construction was awarded to Skanska/Jacobs Babtie and the Highways Agency started working with Skanska to prepare the plans for a Public Inquiry. Public consultations were held in July 2008 and a preferred route was selected in 2009. In June 2010, as part of the government's budget cuts, the project was delayed until after 2015. This resulted in the planned public inquiry being postponed until closer to the construction date. On 13 December 2011 roads minister Mike Penning announced that £150 million had been made available for junction improvements. Highways England states that the cost is £191m. The inspectors report gives the cost as between £217m and £280m with a 'most likely cost' of £251m.

The preferred option was for a three level junction that would separate motorway/trunk road traffic from local traffic completely and provided limited interchange opportunities for through traffic:

- M1 southbound to A14 eastbound - but not to M6 northbound
- M1 northbound to M6 westbound - but not to A14
- M6 southbound to M1 southbound and A14 eastbound - but not to M1 northbound
- A14 westbound to M1 northbound and M6 northbound - but not to M1 southbound

Full construction began on 6 January 2014 and the scheme was fully opened to traffic in December 2016.
