= Levington =

Village in Suffolk, England

Coordinates: 52°00′22″N 1°15′09″E

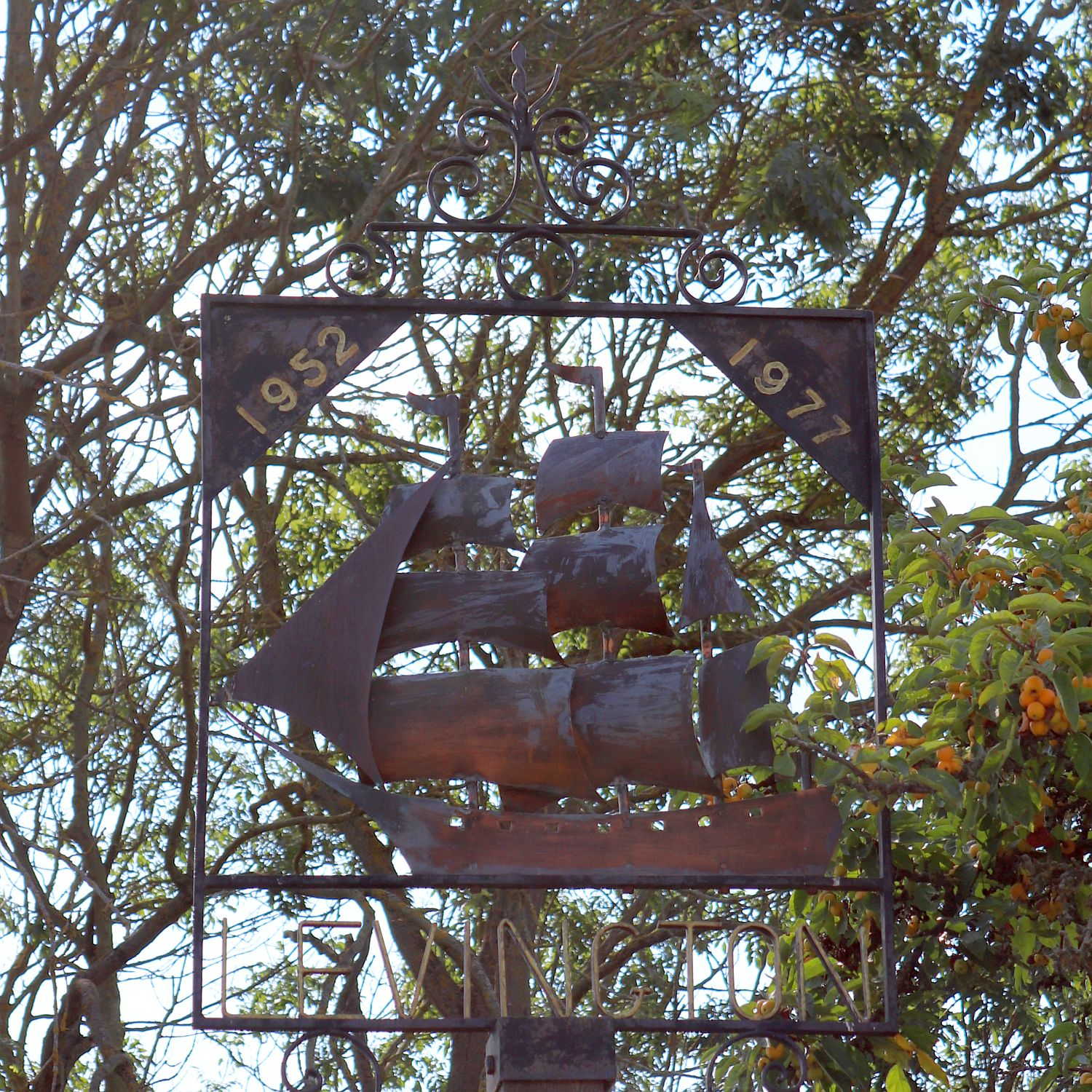
- Levington Village Sign, Suffolk

- Location within Suffolk
- Population: 259 (2011)
- OS grid reference: TM220403
- District: East Suffolk
- Shire county: Suffolk
- Region: East
- Country: England
- Sovereign state: United Kingdom
- Post town: IPSWICH
- Postcode district: IP10
- Dialling code: 01473

Levington is a small village in the East Suffolk district of Suffolk, England. The population of the parish including Stratton Hall at the 2011 Census was 259. It was located in Colneis Hundred.

== History ==
Levington has a church called St Peter's Church and a pub. It is near the large town of Ipswich and the village of Nacton. A Viking ship was once found in Levington. Roger Bigod of Norfolk was the main tenant in chief of the manor in 1086 and it is likely that his descendants the Earls of Norfolk held the manor. The manor had 14 households in 1086 which would amount to between 56 and 70 people living there. Sir Robert Hitcham (1572? – 1636), Member of Parliament, Attorney-General to Anne of Denmark Queen Consort to James I, and one-time owner of Framlingham Castle was born in the village. He bequeathed the castle to Pembroke College, Cambridge, where he had been educated, on his death.

== Geography ==
The village is widely known for the Levington Research Station, built by Fisons in 1957. The fertiliser factory of Fisons was at Bramford, west of Ipswich. The site was well known for developing Levington Compost in the 1960s.

Climate data for Levington (1991-2020 normals)
Month	Jan	Feb	Mar	Apr	May	Jun	Jul	Aug	Sep	Oct	Nov	Dec	Year
Record high °C (°F)	13.5 (56.3)	15.5 (59.9)	18.6 (65.5)	23.5 (74.3)	26.5 (79.7)	29.3 (84.7)	32.4 (90.3)	33.3 (91.9)	27.1 (80.8)	23.0 (73.4)	16.7 (62.1)	15.3 (59.5)	33.3 (91.9)
Mean daily maximum °C (°F)	7.6 (45.7)	8.0 (46.4)	10.5 (50.9)	13.8 (56.8)	17.0 (62.6)	19.9 (67.8)	22.7 (72.9)	22.5 (72.5)	19.4 (66.9)	15.2 (59.4)	10.8 (51.4)	8.1 (46.6)	14.7 (58.5)
Daily mean °C (°F)	5.0 (41.0)	5.1 (41.2)	7.0 (44.6)	9.3 (48.7)	12.5 (54.5)	15.4 (59.7)	18.0 (64.4)	17.9 (64.2)	15.3 (59.5)	11.9 (53.4)	8.0 (46.4)	5.4 (41.7)	10.9 (51.6)
Mean daily minimum °C (°F)	2.5 (36.5)	2.2 (36.0)	3.5 (38.3)	4.9 (40.8)	8.1 (46.6)	10.9 (51.6)	13.3 (55.9)	13.2 (55.8)	11.2 (52.2)	8.6 (47.5)	5.1 (41.2)	2.8 (37.0)	7.2 (45.0)
Record low °C (°F)	−13.2 (8.2)	−8.6 (16.5)	−5.9 (21.4)	−3.5 (25.7)	−1.0 (30.2)	2.7 (36.9)	5.5 (41.9)	4.3 (39.7)	3.0 (37.4)	−1.5 (29.3)	−5.2 (22.6)	−9.5 (14.9)	−13.2 (8.2)
Average precipitation mm (inches)	47.1 (1.85)	42.1 (1.66)	37.3 (1.47)	34.8 (1.37)	39.2 (1.54)	50.5 (1.99)	49.3 (1.94)	47.9 (1.89)	48.7 (1.92)	59.9 (2.36)	55.5 (2.19)	56.8 (2.24)	568.9 (22.40)
Average precipitation days (≥ 1.0 mm)	11.1	9.6	8.4	8.0	7.2	7.9	8.9	8.0	8.3	10.2	11.0	11.2	109.9
Mean monthly sunshine hours	68.2	85.3	126.6	184.6	221.4	214.5	227.4	202.3	158.4	119.0	73.4	60.4	1,741.6
Source 1: Met Office
Source 2: Starlings Roost Weather
