= Spaldwick =

Rural village in Cambridgeshire, England

Coordinates: 52.3415°N 0.3446°W

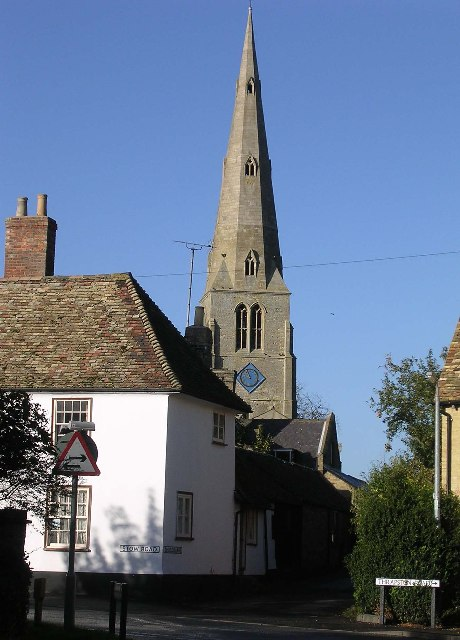
- Spaldwick and its church

- Location within Cambridgeshire
- Population: 631 (2011)
- District: Huntingdonshire
- Shire county: Cambridgeshire
- Region: East
- Country: England
- Sovereign state: United Kingdom
- Post town: Huntingdon
- Postcode district: PE28
- Police: Cambridgeshire
- Fire: Cambridgeshire
- Ambulance: East of England
- UK Parliament: North West Cambridgeshire

Spaldwick is a village and civil parish in Cambridgeshire, England. Spaldwick lies approximately 6 miles (10 km) west of Huntingdon, near Catworth. Spaldwick is situated within Huntingdonshire which is a non-metropolitan district of Cambridgeshire as well as being a historic county of England.

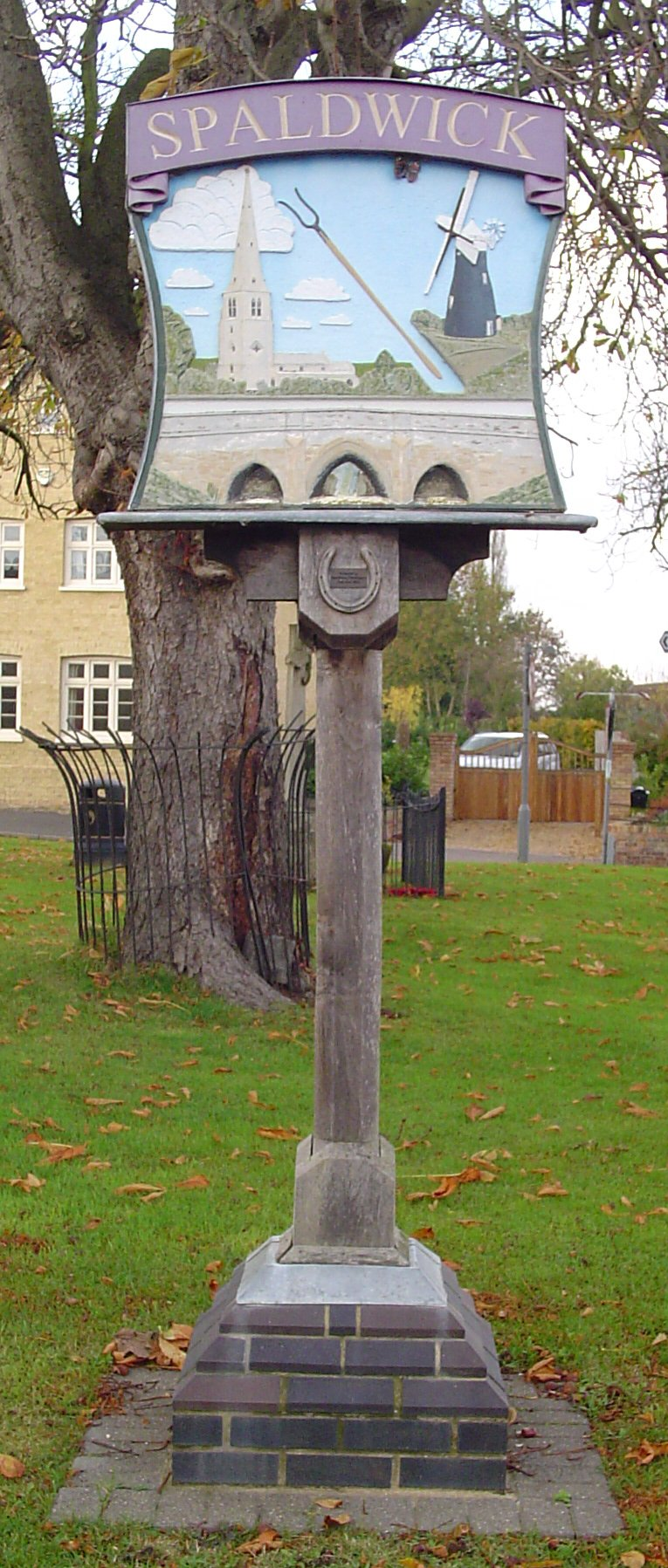
Village sign in Spaldwick

In the village there is a school, preschool, service area (including shop and several food outlets), a church and a public house called The George. The former BT phone box on Royston Avenue has been converted into a Book Exchange.

== History ==
In 1085 William the Conqueror ordered that a survey should be carried out across his kingdom to discover who owned which parts and what it was worth. The survey took place in 1086 and the results were recorded in what, since the 12th century, has become known as the Domesday Book. Starting with the king himself, for each landholder within a county there is a list of their estates or manors; and, for each manor, there is a summary of the resources of the manor, the amount of annual rent that was collected by the lord of the manor both in 1066 and in 1086, together with the taxable value.

Spaldwick was listed in the Domesday Book in the Hundred of Leightonstone in Huntingdonshire; the name of the settlement was written as Spalduic and Spalduice in the Domesday Book. In 1086 there was just one manor at Spaldwick; the annual rent paid to the lord of the manor in 1066 had been £16 and the rent had increased to £22 in 1086.

The Domesday Book does not explicitly detail the population of a place but it records that there were 60 households at Spaldwick. There is no consensus about the average size of a household at that time; estimates range from 3. 5 to 5. 0 people per household. Using these figures then an estimate of the population of Spaldwick in 1086 is that it was within the range of 210 and 300 people.

The Domesday Book uses a number of units of measure for areas of land that are now unfamiliar terms, such as hides and ploughlands. In different parts of the country, these were terms for the area of land that a team of eight oxen could plough in a single season and are equivalent to 120 acres (49 hectares); this was the amount of land that was considered to be sufficient to support a single family. By 1086, the hide had become a unit of tax assessment rather than an actual land area; a hide was the amount of land that could be assessed as £1 for tax purposes. The survey records that there were 29 ploughlands at Spaldwick in 1086. In addition to the arable land, there was 160 acres (65 hectares) of meadows, 60 acres (24 hectares) of woodland and a water mill at Spaldwick.

The tax assessment in the Domesday Book was known as geld or danegeld and was a type of land-tax based on the hide or ploughland. It was originally a way of collecting a tribute to pay off the Danes when they attacked England, and was only levied when necessary. Following the Norman Conquest, the geld was used to raise money for the King and to pay for continental wars; by 1130, the geld was being collected annually. Having determined the value of a manor's land and other assets, a tax of so many shillings and pence per pound of value would be levied on the land holder. While this was typically two shillings in the pound the amount did vary; for example, in 1084 it was as high as six shillings in the pound. For the manor at Spaldwick the total tax assessed was 15 geld.

A church was not recorded at Spaldwick in the Domesday Book. The later medieval parish church is dedicated to St James. The church is a Grade I listed building. Its octagonal broach spire has three tiers of lucarne window openings.

== Government ==
As a civil parish, Spaldwick has a parish council. The parish council is elected by the residents of the parish who have registered on the electoral roll; the parish council is the lowest tier of government in England. A parish council is responsible for providing and maintaining a variety of local services including allotments and a cemetery; grass cutting and tree planting within public open spaces such as a village green or playing fields. The parish council reviews all planning applications that might affect the parish and makes recommendations to Huntingdonshire District Council, which is the local planning authority for the parish. The parish council also represents the views of the parish on issues such as local transport, policing and the environment. The parish council raises its own tax to pay for these services, known as the parish precept, which is collected as part of the Council Tax. For the financial year ending 31 March 2015, the annual precept for Spaldwick was £10, 000. The parish council comprises seven parish councillors and a parish clerk.

Spaldwick was in the historic and administrative county of Huntingdonshire until 1965. From 1965, the village was part of the new administrative county of Huntingdon and Peterborough. Then in 1974, following the Local Government Act 1972, Spaldwick became a part of the county of Cambridgeshire.

The second tier of local government is Huntingdonshire District Council which is a non-metropolitan district of Cambridgeshire and has its headquarters in Huntingdon. Huntingdonshire District Council has 52 councillors representing 29 district wards. Huntingdonshire District Council collects the council tax, and provides services such as building regulations, local planning, environmental health, leisure and tourism. Spaldwick is a part of the district ward of Ellington and is represented on the district council by one councillor. District councillors serve for four-year terms following elections to Huntingdonshire District Council.

For Spaldwick the highest tier of local government is Cambridgeshire County Council which has administration buildings in Cambridge. The county council provides county-wide services such as major road infrastructure, fire and rescue, education, social services, libraries and heritage services. Cambridgeshire County Council consists of 69 councillors representing 60 electoral divisions. Spaldwick is part of the electoral division of Sawtry and Ellington and is represented on the county council by one councillor.

At Westminster Spaldwick is in the parliamentary constituency of North West Cambridgeshire, and elects one Member of Parliament (MP) by the first past the post system of election. Spaldwick is represented in the House of Commons by Shailesh Vara (Conservative). Shailesh Vara has represented the constituency since 2005. The previous member of parliament was Brian Mawhinney (Conservative) who represented the constituency between 1997 and 2005.

== Demography ==
=== Population ===
In the period 1801 to 1901 the population of Spaldwick was recorded every ten years by the UK census. During this time the population was in the range of 249 (the lowest was in 1901) and 470 (the highest was in 1861).

From 1901, a census was taken every ten years with the exception of 1941 (due to the Second World War).

Parish	1911	1921	1931	1951	1961	1971	1981	1991	2001	2011
Spaldwick	258	262	242	284	275	271	309	288	613	631

All population census figures from report Historic Census figures Cambridgeshire to 2011 by Cambridgeshire Insight.

In 2011, the parish covered an area of 1,829 acres (740 hectares) and the population density of Spaldwick in 2011 was 220. 8 persons per square mile (85. 3 per square kilometre).

== Culture and community ==
Across from the school is a children's playground, and behind the houses are trees and walking paths. It is home to a number of active clubs and groups. These include the Escape Group (a youth group focused on securing better facilities for young people in the village), Spaldwick Social Group (which organises various social events), Spaldwick Welcome Club (for the over-55s), Spaldwick Carpet Bowls Club, Spaldwick Community Room Users Association and Spaldwick Bell Ringers. The village also has its own monthly newsletter, Spaldwick News, which is delivered to nearly 260 homes by a team of volunteers. More information on these can be found on the Spaldwick website.

Spaldwick also has one of the largest service area forecourt sites in the UK, which re-opened following a rebuild in 2017, after a fire occurred following an armed robbery in 2015. It is operated by Applegreen which has a shop, Greggs, Costa and Subway.

== Education ==
Spaldwick School is a small primary school for children aged 4 to 11, with about 168 pupils. It is located in Royston Avenue, Spaldwick.
