= Norman Cross Rural District =

Former local government area in the UK

Coordinates: 52.504°N 0.291°W

- Rural district
- Interactive map of Norman Cross Rural District
- Country: England
- Administrative County: Huntingdonshire (1894–1965); Huntingdon and Peterborough (1965–1974)
- Seat: Peterborough

Area
  - Total: 114 km^{2} (44 sq mi)

Population (1961)
  - Total: 10,131

Norman Cross was a rural district in Huntingdonshire from 1894 to 1974.

It was formed in 1894 under the Local Government Act 1894 from the part of the Peterborough rural sanitary district which was in Huntingdonshire (the rest forming part of Peterborough Rural District). It was named for the historic Norman Cross hundred.

It was expanded in 1935 by taking in Elton from the disbanded Oundle Rural District, and Sibson cum Stibbington, which had previously been administered in Barnack Rural District based over the border in the Soke of Peterborough.

In 1965 the Soke and Huntingdonshire merged to form Huntingdon and Peterborough.

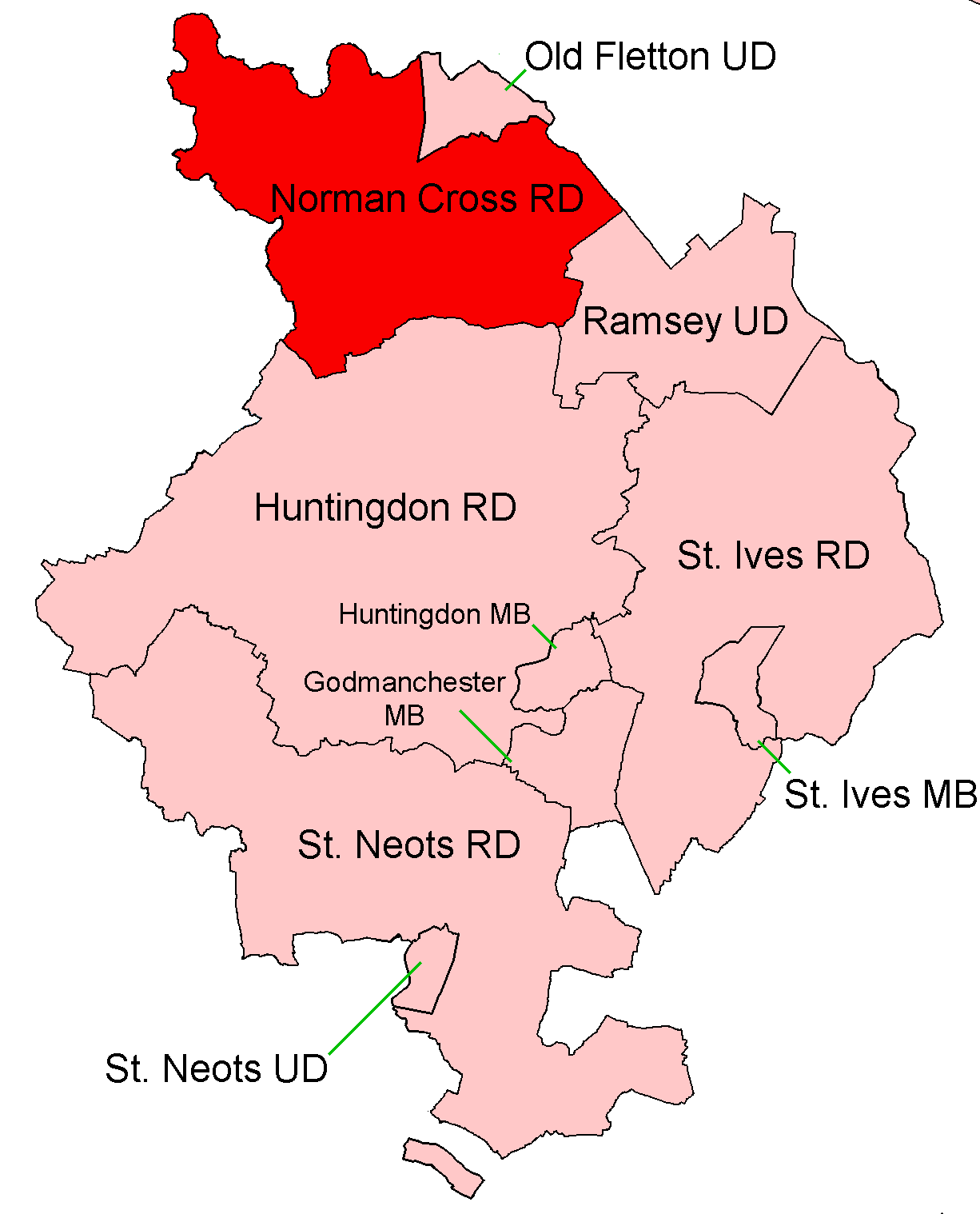
Position within Huntingdonshire

In 1974 the district was abolished under the Local Government Act 1972. Most of the district went on to form part of the Huntingdonshire district in the non-metropolitan county of Cambridgeshire, except that some areas in the north, which were part of Peterborough New Town became part of Peterborough.

== Parishes ==
Parish	From	To	Notes
Alwalton			
Caldecote		1935	See Denton and Caldecote
Chesterton			
Denton and Caldecote	1935		Merger of Denton & Caldecote
Denton		1935	
Elton			
Farcet			
Fletton		1905	To Old Fletton UD
Folksworth and Washingley	1935		Merger of Folksworth & Washingley
Folksworth		1935	
Glatton			
Haddon			
Holme			
Morborne			
Orton Longueville			
Orton Waterville			
Sibson cum Stibbington	1935		Previously administered by Barnack RDC
Stanground		1905	To Old Fletton UD/Thorney RD
Stilton			
Washingley		1935	See Folksworth and Washingley
Water Newton			
Woodston		1905	To Old Fletton UD
Yaxley			
