= Norman Cross =

Norman Cross may refer to:

- Norman Cross Prison, prisoner-of-war camp constructed in 1790s in Huntingdonshire, England
- Norman Cross, Cambridgeshire, hamlet near Peterborough
- Norman Cross Hundred, a subdivision of Huntingdonshire first mentioned in 963 AD
- Norman Cross Rural District, area of Huntingdonshire, England from 1894 to 1974

== People ==
- Norman Cross (baseball) (1910–1982), American baseball player
- Norman Cross (multihull designer) (1915–1990), Canadian multihull sailboat designer
