= History of Huntingdonshire =

This article concerns the History of Huntingdonshire. For other information on the region, see Huntingdonshire.

The English county of Huntingdonshire has existed since Anglo-Saxon times.

== Anglo-Saxon times ==
The earliest English settlers in the district were the Gyrwas, an East Anglian tribe, who early in the 6th century worked their way up the Great Ouse and the Cam as far as Huntingdon. After their conquest of East Anglia in the latter half of the 9th century, Huntingdon became an important seat of the Danes, and the Danish origin of the shire is borne out by an entry in the Anglo-Saxon Chronicle referring to Huntingdon as a military centre to which the surrounding district owed allegiance, while the shire itself is mentioned in the Historia Eliensis in connection with events which took place before or shortly after the death of Edgar.

About 915 Edward the Elder wrested the fen-country from the Danes, repairing and fortifying Huntingdon, and a few years later the district was included in the earldom of East Anglia. Religious foundations were established at Ramsey, Huntingdon and St Neots in the 10th century, and that of Ramsey accumulated vast wealth and influence, owning twenty-six manors in this county alone at the time of the Domesday Survey. In 1011 Huntingdonshire was again overrun by the Danes and in 1016 was attacked by Canute. A few years later the shire was included in the earldom of Thored (of the Middle Angles), but in 1051 it was detached from Mercia and formed part of the East Anglian earldom of Harold. Shortly before the conquest, however, it was bestowed on Siward, as a reward for his part in Godwin's overthrow, and became an outlying portion of the earldom of Northumberland, passing through Waltheof, Earl of Northumbria and Simon de St Liz, Earl of Northampton to David I of Scotland. After the separation of the earldom from the crown of Scotland during the Bruce and Balliol disputes, it was conferred in 1336 on William Clinton; in 1377 on Guichard d'Angle; in 1387 on John Holland; in 1471 on Thomas Grey, afterwards marquess of Dorset; and in 1529 on George, Baron Hastings, whose descendants hold it at the present day.

== Norman conquest ==
The Norman conquest was followed by a general confiscation of estates, and only four or five thanes retained lands that they or their fathers had held in the time of Edward the Confessor. Large estates were held by the church, and the rest of the county for the most part formed outlying portions of the fiefs of William's Norman favourites, including that of Count Eustace of Boulogne. Though not to be confused with Eustace the sheriff of Huntingdonshire, of whose tyrannous exactions bitter complaints are recorded. Kimbolton was fortified by Geoffrey de Mandeville and afterwards passed to the families of Bohun and Stafford. The Hundreds of Huntingdonshire were probably of very early origin, and that of Norman Cross is referred to in 963. The Domesday Survey, besides the four existing divisions of Norman Cross, Toseland, Hurstingstone and Leightonstone, which from their assessment appear to have been double hundreds, mentions an additional hundred of Kimbolton, since absorbed in Leightonstone, while Huntingdon was assessed separately at 50 hides. The boundaries of the county have scarcely changed since the time of the Domesday Survey, except that parts of the Bedfordshire parishes of Everton, Pertenhall and Keysoe and the Northamptonshire parish of Hargrave were then assessed under Huntingdonshire.

Huntingdonshire was formerly in the Diocese of Lincoln, but in 1837 was transferred to Ely. In 1291 it constituted an archdeaconry, comprising the deaneries of Huntingdon, St Ives, Yaxley and Leightonstone, and the divisions remained unchanged until the creation of the deanery of Kimbolton in 1879.

At the time of the Domesday Survey Huntingdonshire had an independent shrievalty, but from 1154 it was united with Cambridgeshire under one sheriff, until in 1637 the two counties were separated for six years, after which they were reunited and have remained so to the present day. The shire court was held at Huntingdon.

== Medieval ==
In 1174 Henry II captured and destroyed Huntingdon Castle. After signing the Great Charter John sent an army to ravage this county under William, Earl of Salisbury, and Falkes de Breauté.

During the Wars of the Roses Huntingdon was sacked by the Lancastrians. The county resisted the illegal taxation of Charles I and joined in a protest against the arrest of the five members. In 1642 it was one of the seven associated counties in which the king had no visible party. Hinchingbrooke House, however, was held for Charles by Sir Sidney Montagu, and in 1645 Huntingdon was captured and plundered by the Royalist forces.

The chief historic family connected with this county were the Cromwells, who held considerable estates in the 16th century.

== 19th century ==
Norman Cross, on the Great North Road, marks the site of the place of confinement of several thousand French soldiers during the Napoleonic wars.

== See also ==
- Hundreds of Huntingdonshire
- Earl of Huntingdon
