= Norman Cross Prison =

Former prisoner-of-war camp in England

Coordinates: 52.5038°N 0.2908°W

1799 watercolour of the prison's layout

Norman Cross Prison in Huntingdonshire, England, was the world's first purpose-built prisoner-of-war camp or "depot". Constructed in 1796–97, it was designed to hold prisoners of war from France and its allies during the French Revolutionary Wars and Napoleonic Wars. By 1816, it had been largely demolished. The hamlet of Norman Cross, now in Cambridgeshire, lies south of Peterborough, between the villages of Folksworth, Stilton, and Yaxley. The junction of the A1 and A15 roads is here. Traditionally in Huntingdonshire, Norman Cross gave its name to one of the hundreds of Huntingdonshire and, from 1894 to 1974, to Norman Cross Rural District.

== Design and construction of prison camp ==
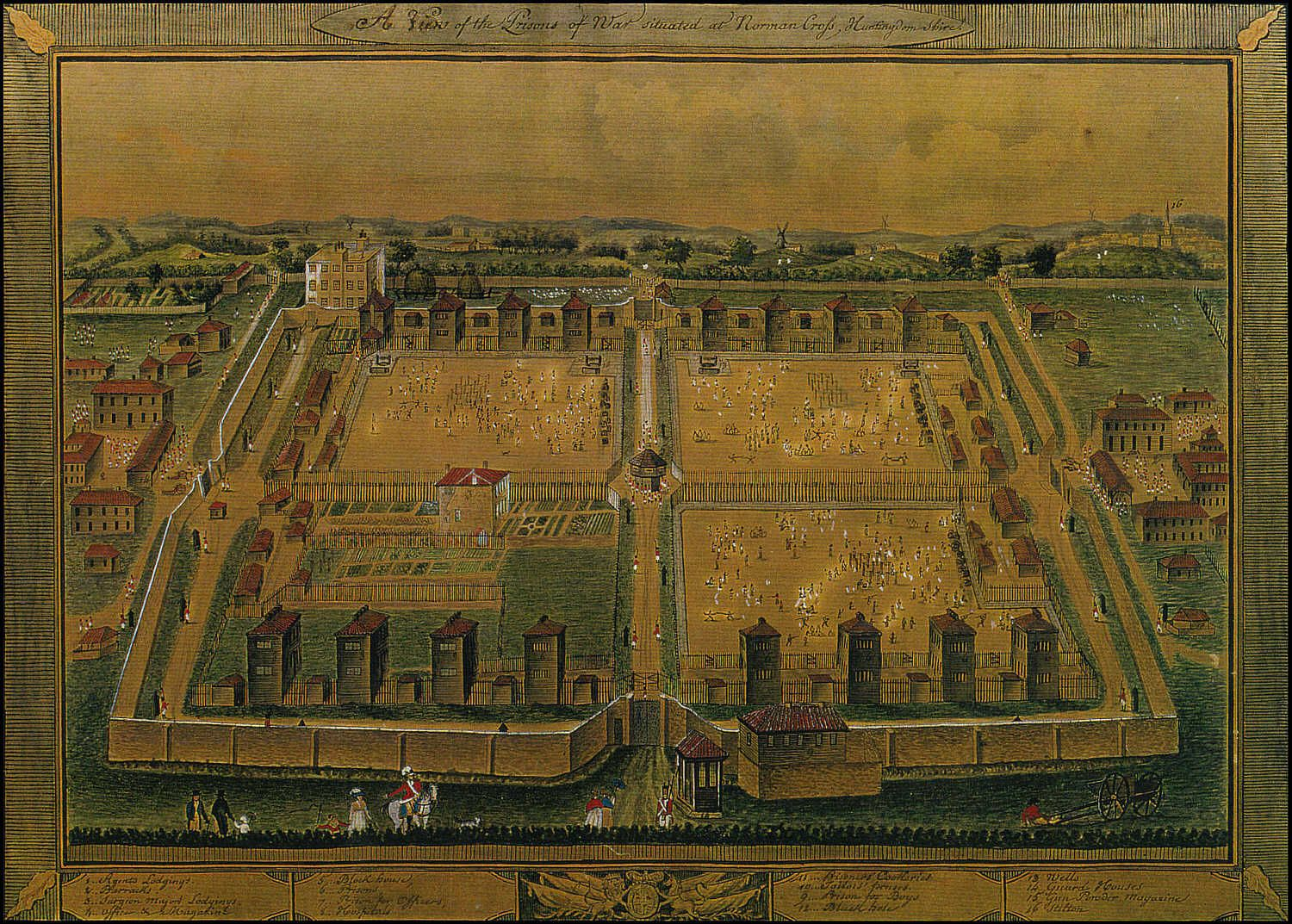
c. 1797 painting of the prison

The Royal Navy's Transport Board was responsible for the care of prisoners of war. When Sir Ralph Abercromby communicated in 1796 that he was transferring 4,000 prisoners from the West Indies, the Board began the search for a site for a new prison. The site was chosen because it was on the Great North Road only 76 miles (122 km) north of London and was deemed far enough from the coast that escaped prisoners could not easily flee back to France. The site had a good water supply and close to sufficient local sources of food to sustain many thousands of prisoners and the guards. Work commenced in December 1796 with much of the timber building prefabricated in London and assembled on site. 500 carpenters and labourers worked on the site for three months. The cost of construction was £34,581 11s 3d.

The design of the prison was based on that of a contemporary artillery fort. A ditch 27 feet (8.2 m) wide and about 5 feet deep (to prevent prisoners tunnelling out) was placed inside the wall (originally a wooden stockade fence, replaced with a brick wall in 1805) and guarded by 'silent sentries' who could not be seen by the prisoners. In 1797, "The prisoners constantly sawed the inner palings [of the stockade] close to the ground, so they could be removed and replaced at night without fear of detection. In this manner they often got through the inner palings, but in crossing to the outer were always recaptured." The barracks for the garrison were placed outside and a large guard house (known as the Block House) containing troops and six cannon was placed right at the centre. The interior of the prison was divided into four quadrangles, each with four double-storey wooden accommodation blocks for 500 prisoners and four ablution blocks. One accommodation block was reserved for officers. Half of each quadrangle was a large exercise yard. The north-east quadrangle contained the prison hospital. There was also a windowless block known as the Black Hole in which prisoners were kept shackled on half rations as punishment, mainly for violence towards the guards although two prisoners were sent to the Black Hole for "infamous vices". 30 wells were sunk to draw drinking water for the prisoners and garrison.

== Operation ==
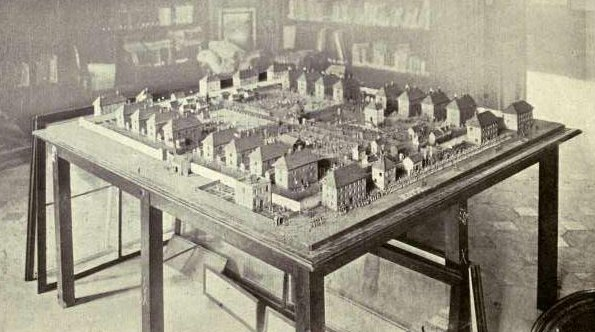
Model of the prison made by a French prisoner photographed at the Musée de l'Armée in 1913

The average prison population was about 5,500 men. The lowest number of prisoners recorded in any official document was 3,300 in October 1804 and the highest was 6,272 on 10 April 1810.

Norman Cross was intended to be a model depot providing the most humane treatment of prisoners of war. Sir Rupert George was responsible for the "care and custody" of the French prisoners.

Most of the men held in the prison were low-ranking soldiers and sailors, including midshipmen and junior officers, with a small number of privateers. About 100 senior officers and some civilians "of good social standing", mainly passengers on captured ships and the wives of some officers, were given parole d'honneur outside the prison, mainly in Peterborough, although some as far away as Northampton, Plymouth, Melrose, and Abergavenny. They were afforded the courtesy of their rank within English society. Some "with good private means" hired servants and often dined out while wearing full uniform. Three French officers died of natural causes while on parole and were buried with full military honours. Four French officers and five Dutch officers married English women while on parole. The most senior officer on parole from the prison was General Charles Lefebvre-Desnouettes who resided with his wife in Cheltenham from 1809 until they escaped back to France in 1811. General René-Martin Pillet (1762–1816), Adjutant Commandant was confined here for breaking parole; he was allowed further parole and after again attempting to escape was sent to Chatham.

Among the prisoners in 1797 were Germans who had been conscripted into the French army. These were encouraged to enlist in the 60th Foot, which was raising a rifle-armed 5th Battalion in imitation of German jägers.

=== Clothing ===
The French prisoners, whose main pastime was gambling, were accused by the British government of selling their clothes and few personal possessions to raise money for further gambling. In 1801, the British government issued statements blaming the French Consul for not supplying sufficient clothing (the British government had paid the French for all English prisoners held in France and French colonies to be clothed). In July 1801 Jeremiah Askew, a tradesman at Yaxley, was convicted of being in possession of palliasses and other articles bearing the government mark of the 'broad arrow'. He was sentenced to stand in the pillory at Norman Cross and two years of hard labour.

Samuel Johnson and a Mr Serle, who visited the barracks, compiled a report on behalf of the British government, stating that the proportion of food allowance was fully sufficient to maintain both life and health, but added: "provided it is not shamefully lost by gambling". The Lords of the Admiralty, along with Johnson, instructed that naked prisoners should be clothed at once, without waiting for the French supply or payment for clothing.

The British government provided each naked prisoner with a yellow suit, a grey or yellow cap, a yellow jacket, a red waistcoat, yellow trousers, a neckerchief, two shirts, two pairs of stockings, and one pair of shoes. The bright colours were chosen to aid the recognition of escaped prisoners. In Foulley's model of the prison (at the Musée de l'Armée, Paris; pictured above) more than half the prisoners are represented wearing these clothes.

=== Food ===
Food was prepared by cooks drawn from the prison ranks. The cooks, one for every 12 prisoners, were paid a small allowance by the British government. The initial daily food ration for each prisoner was 1 lb of beef, 1 lb of bread, 1 lb of potatoes, and 1 lb of cabbage or pease. As the majority of prisoners were Roman Catholic, herrings or cod was substituted for beef on Fridays. Each prisoner was also allowed 2 oz of soap per week. In November 1797, the British and French governments agreed that each should feed their own citizens in their enemy's prisons. The French provided a daily ration of one pint of beer, 8 oz of beef or fish, 26 oz of bread, 2 oz of cheese and 1 lb of potato or fresh vegetables. They were also allowed 1 lb of soap and 1 lb of tobacco per month. Patients in the prison hospital were given a daily ration of one pint of tea morning and evening, 16 oz of bread, 16 oz of beef, mutton or fish, one pint of broth, 16 oz of green vegetables or potato, and two pints of beer.

The British government went to great lengths to provide food of a quality at least equal to that available to locals. The senior officer from each quadrangle was permitted to inspect the food as it was delivered to the prison to ensure it was of sufficient quality.

Despite the generous supply and quality of food, some prisoners died of starvation after gambling away their rations.

=== Education ===
Most prisoners were illiterate and were offered the opportunity to learn to read and write in their native language and English. Prisoners who could read were given access to books. News on the progress of the war, including successes and defeats on both sides, was reported to prisoners.

In April 1799, French prisoners at Liverpool were reported to have performed plays by Voltaire in a neat prison theatre they had constructed. In July 1799, Dutch prisoners at Norman Cross sought permission to use one building as a theatre. The Sea Lords refused. However, Foulley's model, depicting the prison as it was in about 1809, shows a theatre in the south-west quadrangle.

=== Religion ===
There was no prison chapel but a Catholic priest resided in the garrison barracks. From 1808, the former Bishop of Moulins Étienne-Jean-Baptiste-Louis des Gallois de La Tour, who lived in exile at Stilton, was permitted by the Admiralty to minister and provide charity to the prisoners at his own expense. He later became Archbishop of Bourges.

=== Health ===
Sick prisoners were initially treated in the prison hospital by two French Navy surgeons and 24 orderlies.

As the number of prisoners increased, disease spread throughout the camp and 1,020 prisoners died in a typhus outbreak in 1800–1801. A special 'typhus cemetery' was dug near the camp.

Leonard Gillespie, Surgeon to the Fleet, wrote in 1804 that pneumonia was common with some cases becoming fatal carditis. There were also many cases of consumption. A brick house for a resident British surgeon was built adjacent to the prison hospital in 1805.

A peculiar outbreak of nyctalopia or night-blindness affected many of the prisoners in 1806. They became severely dyspeptic and completely blind from sunset until dawn, to the extent that their fitter companions had to lead them around the camp. Various treatments were tried and failed; finally they were cured with black hellebore, given as snuff, which relieved the dyspepsia and restored their night vision within a few days.

A total of 1,770 prisoner deaths were recorded, the majority from disease, during the time the prison was in operation, although the records are incomplete.

== Craft and prison economy ==
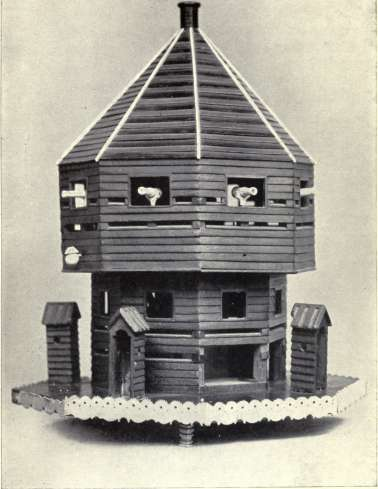
Model of the Block House made by a French prisoner in 1801; photographed in 1913

At the outbreak of the war, the Transport Board wrote that "the prisoners in all the depots in the country are at full liberty to exercise their industry within the prisons, in manufacturing and selling any articles they may think proper excepting those which would affect the Revenue in opposition to the Laws, obscene toys and drawings, or articles made either from their clothing or the prison stores".

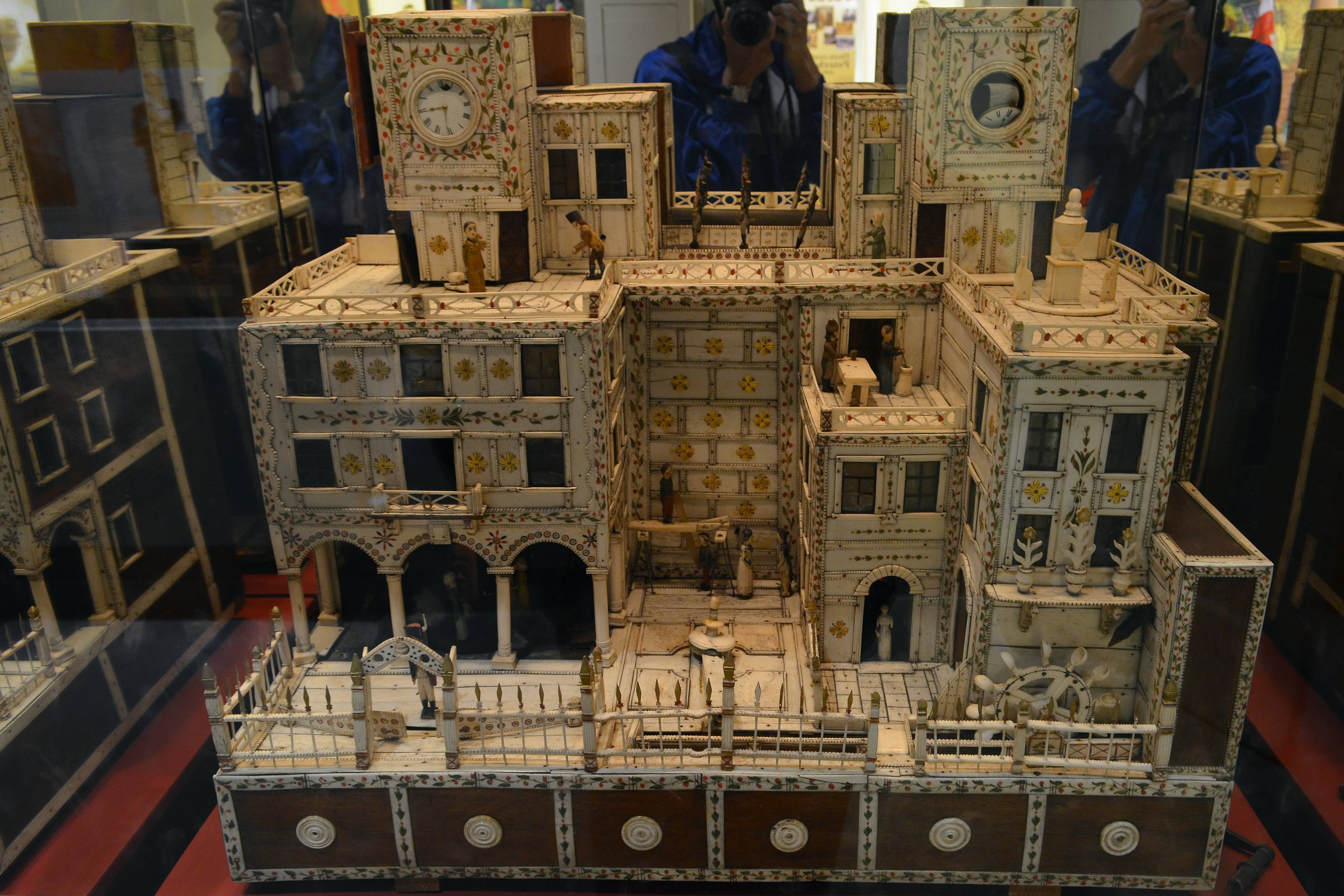
Doll's house at Peterborough Museum

Many prisoners at Norman Cross made artefacts such as toys, model ships and dominoes sets from carved wood or animal bone, and straw marquetry. Examples of the prisoners' craftwork were sold to visitors and passersby. Some highly skilled prisoners were commissioned by wealthy individuals, some of the prisoners becoming very rich in the process. Archdeacon William Strong, a regular visitor to the prison, notes in his diary of 23 October 1801 that he provided a piece of mahogany and paid a prisoner £1 15s 6d to build a model of the Block House and £2 2s for a straw picture of Peterborough Cathedral.

Prisoners were permitted to sell artefacts twice a week at the local market, or daily at the prison gate. Prices were regulated so the prisoners did not undersell local industries. In return, prisoners were permitted to buy additional food, tobacco, wine, clothes or materials for further work. In 1813 ten inmates on behalf of the prisoners were allowed to attend the sale of articles, a long tent was erected in the barrack-yard, where these were exhibited to the visitors, who had purchased articles through the summer, to the amount of £50 to £60 a week.

At the end of the war, the Transport Board noted that some prisoners had earned as much as 100 guineas. An advertisement in 1814 demonstrated that some items were made collectively and others by a solo craftsman.

The Exhibition of the Thuilleries, the Luxembourg, and the Palace of Charles IV which are now open, No. 42, Old Bond-street, are most uncommon proofs of human ingenuity; whether we take into consideration the many figures moving in all directions, and exercising their different trades on the material with which they are constructed, namely, the bone of beef, they are equally the objects of our admiration. The Thuilleries and the Luxembourg took two years and four months in arranging the architecture only; and the Palace of Charles IV was seven years in completing, being the labour of an individual. These celebrated productions were the work of the French prisoners, during their confinement at Norman Cross.

Thousands of Norman Cross artefacts survive today in local museums, including 800 in Peterborough Museum, and private collections. A collection of model ships made at Norman Cross is on display at Arlington Court in Devon.

During December 1804, prisoners Nicholas Deschamps and Jean Roubillard were discovered forging £1 bank notes. Engraved plates of a very high standard and printing implements were found. The former was convicted of forgery and the latter of uttering at the Huntingdon Assizes in 1805. Francois Raize gave evidence for the crown. Forging banknotes was a capital offence at the time. They were sentenced to death but this was commuted. They remained in Huntingdon Gaol until they received a free pardon from the Prince Regent and were moved to Norman Cross and repatriated with the prisoners of war to France in 1814.

Prisoners at the Norman Cross site were not permitted to manufacture straw hats or bonnets (presumably so as not to impinge upon the local industry). The authorities appear to have enforced this stipulation: at Huntingdon Assizes in May 1811 John Lun, snr (twelve months) and three sons (six months) were sentenced to prison for a conspiracy, in endeavouring to persuade the NCOs and privates of the garrison to permit a quantity of straw to be conveyed into the site for the purpose of making straw hats. In September 1812 the North York Militia held a regimental court-martial lasting three days that reduced four sergeants to the ranks and reprimanded two others for conniving at the guards smuggling raw straw into the prison and the plaited product out.

== Insubordination and escapes ==
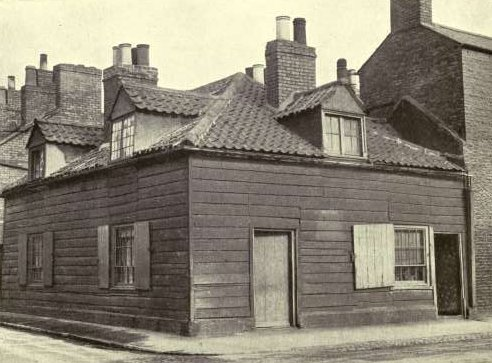
Building removed from Norman Cross in April 1816 and converted to cottages in Peterborough; photographed in 1913

Insubordination was rife among prisoners. A force of Shropshire Militia, a battalion of army reserve, and a volunteer force from Peterborough were required to restrain the prisoners from breaking out during a particular period of defiance. As a boy, the author George Borrow lived at the camp from July 1811 to April 1813 with his father Lieutenant Thomas Borrow of the West Norfolk Militia; he described the place in Lavengro.

Six prisoners escaped in April 1801. Three of them were caught at Boston, Lincolnshire, and the remaining three were caught in a fishing boat off the Norfolk coast. In the hat of one was found a complete map of the Lincolnshire coast. Each year the number of attempts to escape increased, as did the numbers in each escape. Three groups of 16 men each escaped in late 1801. Incomplete tunnels were discovered in 1802.

In October 1804 the press reported the prisoners created a disturbance with the intention of breaking the perimeter fencing. Assistance was sent for from Peterborough. A troop of Yeomanry galloped to support, later followed by two more troops and an infantry unit. The prisoners had cut down a part of the wood enclosure during the night, nine of them effected their escape through the aperture. At daybreak, it was discovered in another part of the prison that prisoners had undermined a distance of 34 feet towards the great South road under the fosse which surrounded the prison, although the fosse was four feet deep, and no tools were discovered with them. Five escapees were taken.

During the night, several prisoners escaped in February 1807. Three escapees were retaken near Ryde heading for Southampton in April 1807. The agent at the depot (camp commander), Captain Pressland RN, was inviting tenders for the building of a wall, in August 1807. This may have become known to the prisoners as a major escape attempt was made.

About a fortnight ago a formidable attempt was made by the prisoners of war at Norman Cross to effect their escape from confinement. Between ten and eleven o'clock at night a force of 500 of them rushed all at once violently against the interior paling of the prison, and in an instant levelled one angle of it with the ground. They were proceeding to make a like experiment upon the next inclosure (constructed, like the former, of wood), when they were charged by the military of the barracks, and more than 40 were severely wounded with the bayonet before they were driven back to their confines. None escaped: but in consequence of this attempt a vast inclosure of brick-work is now building about the prison; is to be 14 feet high, and nearly a mile in circumference.

After the second of these two major escape attempts in 1804 and 1807, the wooden stockade fence was soon replaced with a brick wall.

One prisoner, Charles Francois Marie Bourchier, stabbed a civilian, Alexander Halliday, while attempting to escape on 9 September 1808. He was convicted at the Huntingdon Assizes and sentenced to death by hanging. He was taken from Huntingdon Gaol on Friday 16th and executed at Norman Cross in front of the prisoners and the whole garrison. This was the only civil execution at Norman Cross. After the stabbing, the guards, having seen two or three other knives, searched the entire prison and 700 daggers were found.

On 24 September 1808, an English sloop of 44 tons called the Margaret Anne (William Tempel, master, of Barton) arrived at Calais, laden with 18 tons of coals. She was seized in the night of the 20th, in the Humber, by three French prisoners who had escaped from Norman Cross. In November 1809, two French Navy officers escaped by secreting themselves in the soil carts of the prison, in which they were drawn out of the confines of the depot.

In December 1809 an inquest took place on Jean Barthelemy Toohe, a French prisoner of war who, as he was endeavouring to make his escape over the pailing of the prison, was fired at by the sentinel on duty; the ball entered his back, and he died shortly afterwards.

Duelling continued amongst prisoners. On 15 May 1811 at Norman Cross, two fought with scissors attached to sticks. One duellist wounded the survivor twice, before the latter made the thrust that proved fatal. It was reported that "On Saturday the 19th an inquisition was taken at Norman Cross Barracks, on view of the body of Julien Cheral, a French prisoner of war, who met his death by a fellow prisoner of the name of Jean Francois Pons stabbing. Verdict — Self Defence."

In January 1812, a French prisoner was shot whilst escaping after he had overpowered a guard and stolen a bayonet. The guard was committed to Huntingdon Gaol for the next assizes on a charge of manslaughter.

In August 1812 Prosper Louis, 7th Duke of Arenberg, was sent to Norman Cross after refusing to conform to the new reporting rules of his parole at Bridgnorth, where he was staying with his wife, Stéphanie Tascher de La Pagerie (a niece of Empress Joséphine). After a period, he agreed to follow the reporting requirement and was paroled again.

During August 1813, escaped prisoners from Norman Cross were discovered as far away as Hampshire.

== Military units ==
In July 1810 the Northumberland Militia were inspected at the barracks by Hugh Percy, 2nd Duke of Northumberland. After he had reviewed them, the duke presented the commanding officer with £150 for the regiment to regale themselves with. On 22 April 1812 the Edinburgh Militia relieved the 2nd West York at Yaxley barracks, and the latter regiment marched to Colchester. However, the Edinburgh's Militia were soon sent north to deal with Luddite machine-breaking and with a very large group of French prisoners arriving from the Peninsula the guards had to be reinforced quickly. The Bedfordshire Militia were sent from Littlehampton in wagons changed at each town, the officers in post chaises, the journey of 166 miles (267 km) taking just six days (29 April to 4 May).

Men from the following units were stationed at the prison:

Period	Unit	Ref.
Early 1797–	Cambridgeshire Militia	
March 1797–c.April 1799	Royal South Lincolnshire Militia	
October–December 1797	North York Militia	
November 1797–March 1798	East Norfolk Militia	
July–December 1801	Hertfordshire Militia	
1804	4th Reserve Battalion	
1804	7th Reserve Battalion	
Late 1804	Shropshire Militia	
1808	Northampton Militia. In November Wiltshire Militia relieved by 3d West York	
January–April 1812	West Essex Militia	
January–May 1812	2nd Yorkshire West Riding Militia	
21 April–6 May 1812	Edinburgh Militia	
4 May–28 October 1812	Bedfordshire Militia	
May–November 1812	North York Militia	
November 1812–April 1813	Meath Militia	
November 1812–May 1813	Sligo Militia	
December 1812–March 1813	South Lincolnshire Militia	
April–October 1813	West Kent Militia	
July–November 1813	Aberdeenshire Militia	
September 1813–July 1814	Hertfordshire Militia	
November 1813–June 1814	1st Yorkshire West Riding Militia	

== Arrival and repatriation ==
Many of the prisoners arrived via Portsmouth or Plymouth and were marched hundreds of miles to Norman Cross.

In April 1797 six transports having on board near 1,000 French prisoners disembarked at King's Lynn from Falmouth. The prisoners, under an escort of the Lincoln Militia marched from there to Norman Cross. Most prisoners arrived on foot from Portsmouth, Plymouth, Hull, Great Yarmouth, and other ports. In October 1797, 300 prisoners embarked from Peterborough quay to be exchanged. The sea trip to the continent was by cartel ship. When the first peace was proclaimed, prisoners were taken to Wisbech in lighters to join others in Wisbech Gaol to depart from the Port of Wisbech for France.

Not all prisoners waited for repatriation after the end of the war. Several Dutch prisoners expressed their willingness to enlist in the British military, and in January 1807 up to 60 Dutchmen whose services had been accepted were marched by an escort detachment of the Pembrokeshire Militia to Portsmouth, where they were distributed as sailors onboard the various Royal Navy ships at anchor there.

Peace was finally proclaimed with France in 1814, following Napoleon's defeat and consequent abdication. The prisoners, the garrison guards and local people joined in celebrations. The first division of 500 prisoners left on 5 April. The Star reported "We are sorry to add that on their way to the sea coast for embarkation, a few indulged in drinking to such excess, that two of them perished in a fit of intoxication, and nearly thirty were left on the road unable to proceed to their native land. They carry home with them about six thousand pounds in English money, being the profits on the sale of the toys, &c. which they manufactured at the depot".

The remaining prisoners left the garrison by June 1814. A few decided to remain in England and settled near Yaxley and Stilton.

== Demolition and survivals ==
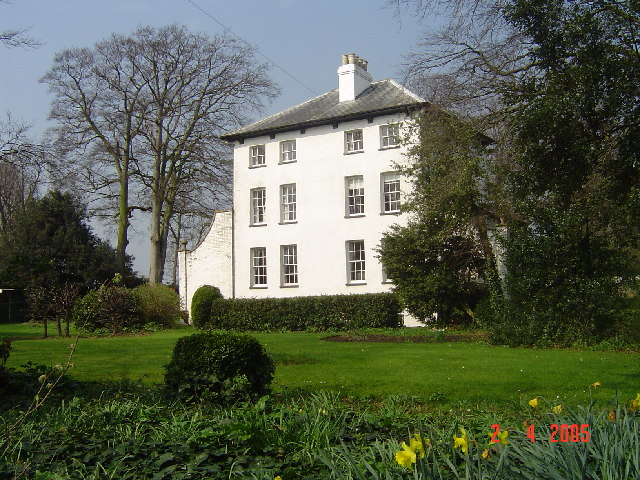
Norman House

In April 1815, "1,000 Yards of capital Board Fencing, now standing round the burial ground appropriated to the late French prisoners, near Norman Cross Inn" were advertised for sale. The wooden buildings were dismantled in June 1816 and the parts sold at auction. Some of the buildings were relocated to nearby towns although much of the timber structures were sold as firewood.

The site is considered of national importance and has been classified as a scheduled monument. The commander of the depot was the agent and his house survives, as the Old Governor's House. The restored stables are now a privately owned art gallery. Norman House, the barrack master's house, also survives. Both the Old Governor's House and Norman House are Grade II listed buildings.

== Memorial ==
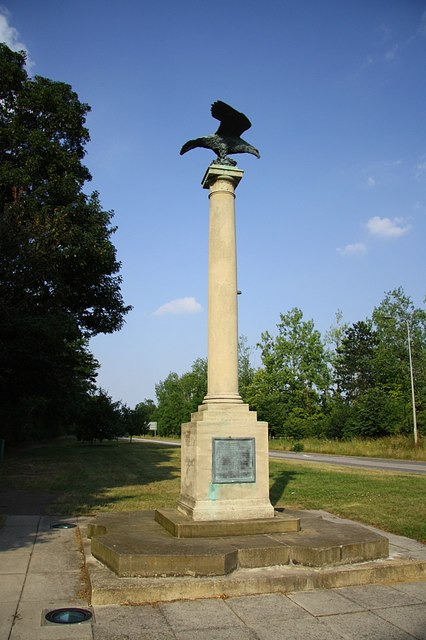
Norman Cross Monument

The memorial to the 1,770 prisoners who died at Norman Cross was erected in 1914 by the Entente Cordiale Society beside the Great North Road. The bronze Imperial Eagle was stolen in 1990, but replaced with a new one in 2005 following a fundraising appeal.

When a section of the A1 was upgraded to motorway standard in 1998 the memorial required relocating. On 2 April 2005, the Duke of Wellington, a patron of the appeal, unveiled the restored memorial on a new site beside the A15. A replacement bronze eagle, sculpted by John Doubleday, was placed on the re-sited column.

== Study ==
An archaeological dig was carried out on part of the site by Channel 4 series Time Team in 2009. Part of the wall, an accommodation block, ablution hut and burial ground were uncovered. The episode, "Death and Dominoes: The First POW Camp", of series 17 of Time Team was broadcast in October 2010.

== Site ownership and conservation ==
In 2025 the site of the Norman Cross prison depot was bought by the Nene Park Trust, a purchase supported with grants from Historic England and the National Lottery Heritage Fund. The site is now open to the public.
