= Buckworth =

Village in Cambridgeshire, England

Coordinates: 52.38°N 0.31°W

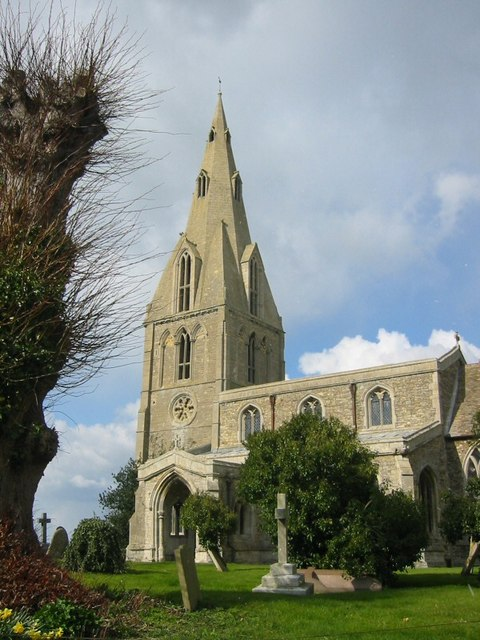
- Buckworth All Saints

- Location within Cambridgeshire
- Population: 181 (including Barham and Woolley. 2011)
- OS grid reference: TL150771
- District: Huntingdonshire
- Shire county: Cambridgeshire
- Region: East
- Country: England
- Sovereign state: United Kingdom
- Post town: Huntingdon
- Postcode district: PE28
- Dialling code: 01480
- Police: Cambridgeshire
- Fire: Cambridgeshire
- Ambulance: East of England
- UK Parliament: North West Cambridgeshire

Buckworth is a village and civil parish in Cambridgeshire, England. Buckworth lies approximately 7 miles (11 km) northwest of Huntingdon and covers an area of 2,023 acres. It is also a part of the hundred called Leightonstone. Buckworth is situated within Huntingdonshire which is a non-metropolitan district of Cambridgeshire as well as being a historic county of England.

The village is located on the slope of a hill, in the middle of farmlands and facing northeast. The road crossing Buckworth (Church Road) joins Alconbury and Barham and is the main street of the village.

== History ==
=== Middle Ages ===
According to the Dictionary of British place-names, the name of the parish comes from the "enclosure of a man called Bucc, or where bucks are kept".

In 1085, William the Conqueror ordered that a survey should be carried out across his kingdom to discover who owned which parts and what it was worth. The survey took place in 1086 and the results were recorded in what, since the 12th century, has become known as the Domesday Book. Starting with the king himself, for each landholder within a county there is a list of their estates or manors; and, for each manor, there is a summary of the resources of the manor, the amount of annual rent that was collected by the lord of the manor both in 1066 and in 1086, together with the taxable value.

Buckworth was listed in the Domesday Book in the Hundred of Leightonstone in Huntingdonshire; the name of the settlement was written as Buchesworde in the Domesday Book. In 1086 there was just one manor at Buckworth; the annual rent paid to the lord of the manor in 1066 had been £10 and the rent had increased to £13 in 1086.

The Domesday Book does not explicitly detail the population of a place but it records that there was 25 households at Buckworth. There is no consensus about the average size of a household at that time; estimates range from 3.5 to 5.0 people per household. Using these figures then an estimate of the population of Buckworth in 1086 is that it was within the range of 87 and 125 people.

The Domesday Book uses a number of units of measure for areas of land that are now unfamiliar terms, such as hides and ploughlands. In different parts of the country, these were terms for the area of land that a team of eight oxen could plough in a single season and are equivalent to 120 acres (49 hectares); this was the amount of land that was considered to be sufficient to support a single family. By 1086, the hide had become a unit of tax assessment rather than an actual land area; a hide was the amount of land that could be assessed as £1 for tax purposes. The survey records that there was 18 ploughlands at Buckworth in 1086. In addition to the arable land, there was 80 acres (32 hectares) of meadows and 30 acres (12 hectares) of woodland at Buckworth.

The tax assessment in the Domesday Book was known as geld or danegeld and was a type of land-tax based on the hide or ploughland. It was originally a way of collecting a tribute to pay off the Danes when they attacked England, and was only levied when necessary. Following the Norman Conquest, the geld was used to raise money for the King and to pay for continental wars; by 1130, the geld was being collected annually. Having determined the value of a manor's land and other assets, a tax of so many shillings and pence per pound of value would be levied on the land holder. While this was typically two shillings in the pound the amount did vary; for example, in 1084 it was as high as six shillings in the pound. For the manor at Buckworth the total tax assessed was 10 geld.

By 1086, there was already a church and a priest at Buckworth. In 1066, the Lord was Earl Tosti and in 1086 Robert Count of Eu. The Head of the Manor is mentioned to be Great Paxton I. Concerning agriculture, Buckworth used to be on the route from the north of England to bring animals to the London markets. It was a busy thoroughfare.

=== The 19th Century ===
From 1 July 1837, Buckworth was a part of the Huntingdon Registration district. Thereafter, it was integrated to the Spaldwick sub-District. However, it is now back in the Huntingdon District. Buckworth was a part of the Poor Laws in the Huntingdon Union.

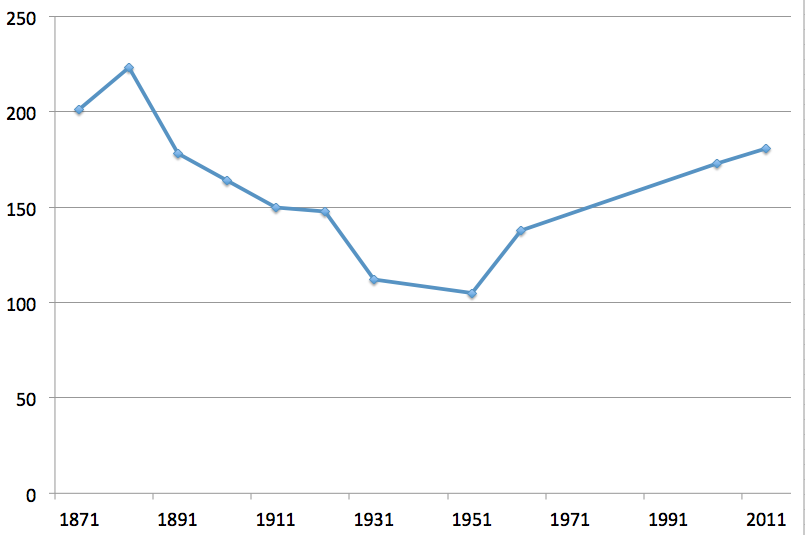
Total population of Buckworth Civil Parish, as reported by the Census of Population from 1871 to 2011

In the 1870s, Buckworth was described as:" BUCKWORTH, a parish in the district and county of Huntingdon; 5¼ miles W of the Great Northern railway, and 7 NW of Huntingdon. Post Town, Alconbury, under Huntingdon. Pop., 201. Houses, 39."

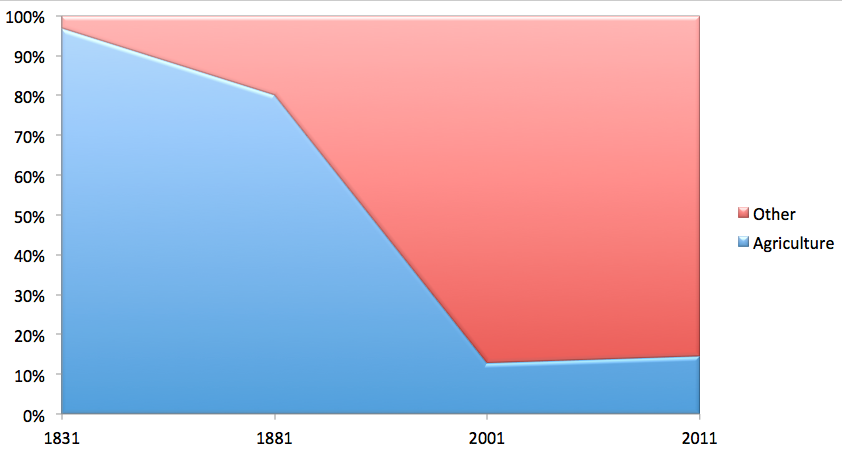
Percentage of males working in agriculture compared to the total population in Buckworth from 1831 to 2011

The first Census available for Buckworth is dated at 1801 and at this time the village was composed of 130 inhabitants only. The population had grown consistently until 1880. In the 1881 Census of population, the number of people living in Buckworth was 223, which was the highest so far. Until 1950 the population decreased more or less constantly and the population's growth began again at the beginning of the 1950s up to now.

As reported in the 1831 and 1881 Occupational Orders, the main source of employment for men was agriculture. In 1881, female workers were employed in domestic service, in offices or without specified occupations for the most part. The other principal categories of employment were professionals, animals, dress, mineral substances, and house, furniture and decorations.

=== First and second World Wars ===
According to a war memorial in All Saints Church, two men died in the First World War, one in Vinny Ridge and the second in Agnez. However, no deaths were registered during the Second World War as nobody from the village was engaged in military defence. During the night of 16 April 1942, five land mines from the British aircraft were jettisoned near Brook Lodge Farm. They all exploded but no damages or injuries occurred. The Second World War changed the way of farming in the village. As Great-Britain became dependent on home-grown food, the non-productive land had to finally be used.

== Present Day ==
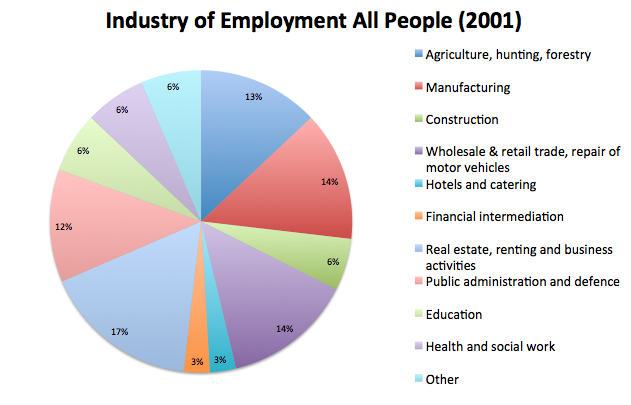
Buckworth Industry of Employment - All People, 2001, as rerouted by the Neighbourhood Statistics from 2001

According to the Neighbourhood Statistics, employment in the parish is no longer only composed of agricultural activities. The number of farmers has decreased massively because of technology. The main sources of employment now include manufacturing, wholesale trade, the retail trade, repair of motor vehicles, real estate, renting and business activities, public administration and defense. Furthermore, a few people are working in the following categories: construction, hotels and catering, financial intermediation, education, health and social work and other.

Buckworth had a population of 181 according to the 2011 census. The parish is now part of the Ellington district ward and the Sawtry county ward. As reported by the Office for National Statistics, the village is "surrounded by inhabited countryside". Housing types are a mix of detached and semi-detached which are for the most part owner-occupied or private rented. The average asking price for any kind of property in the area is £270,412. However, detached houses are the most popular type of property sold in the area and are worth an average of £340,137. The area is really safe with only one incident of antisocial behavior recorded in 2011.

== Government ==
As a civil parish, Buckworth has a parish council. The parish council is elected by the residents of the parish who have registered on the electoral roll; the parish council is the lowest tier of government in England. A parish council is responsible for providing and maintaining a variety of local services including allotments and a cemetery; grass cutting and tree planting within public open spaces such as a village green or playing fields. The parish council reviews all planning applications that might affect the parish and makes recommendations to Huntingdonshire District Council, which is the local planning authority for the parish. The parish council also represents the views of the parish on issues such as local transport, policing and the environment. The parish council raises its own tax to pay for these services, known as the parish precept, which is collected as part of the Council Tax.

Buckworth was in the historic and administrative county of Huntingdonshire until 1965. From 1965, the village was part of the new administrative county of Huntingdon and Peterborough. Then in 1974, following the Local Government Act 1972, Buckworth became a part of the county of Cambridgeshire.

The second tier of local government is Huntingdonshire District Council which is a non-metropolitan district of Cambridgeshire and has its headquarters in Huntingdon. Huntingdonshire District Council has 52 councillors representing 29 district wards. Huntingdonshire District Council collects the council tax, and provides services such as building regulations, local planning, environmental health, leisure and tourism. Buckworth is a part of the district ward of Ellington and is represented on the district council by one councillor. District councillors serve for four year terms following elections to Huntingdonshire District Council.

For Buckworth the highest tier of local government is Cambridgeshire County Council which has administration buildings in Cambridge. The county council provides county-wide services such as major road infrastructure, fire and rescue, education, social services, libraries and heritage services. Cambridgeshire County Council consists of 69 councillors representing 60 electoral divisions. Buckworth is a part of the electoral division of Sawtry and Ellington and is represented on the county council by one councillor. County councillors serve for four year terms following elections to Cambridgeshire County Council.

At Westminster, Buckworth is in the parliamentary constituency of North West Cambridgeshire and elects one Member of Parliament (MP) by the first past the post system of election. Buckworth is represented in the House of Commons by Shailesh Vara (Conservative). Shailesh Vara has represented the constituency since 2005. The previous member of parliament was Brian Mawhinney (Conservative) who represented the constituency between 1997 and 2005.

== Places of interest ==
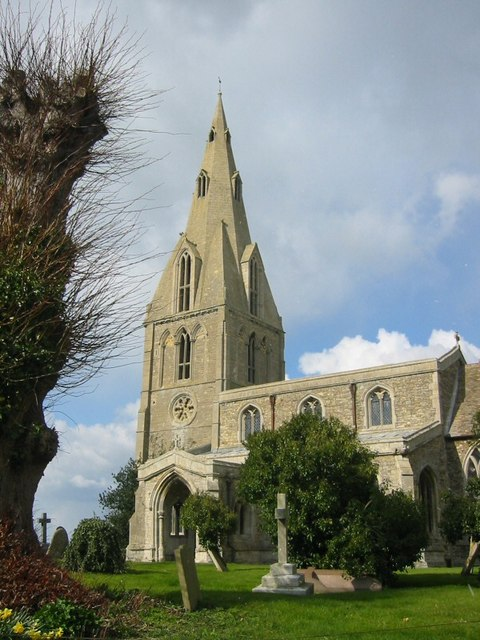
Buckworth All Saints - geograph.org.uk - 370715

- All Saints church, the main building and the landmark of the parish stands at its centre. It was listed on 28 January 1958 as a Grade II building. It was first mentioned in the Domesday survey in 1086. The building's oldest remains are dated from the 12th Century for the East angles of the nave. The construction materials are rubble with stone dressings for the walls and tiles and lead for the roof. This edifice is now composed of a nave (built in the 12th Century), the South arcade and aisle (13th), the North arcade and aisle (14th), the West tower (14th), the South porch (15th) and the roof (15th). In 1862 and in 1884, the church was reconditioned. In 1925, the spire of the West tower was renovated. The church has recently been awarded £156,000 by the Heritage Lottery Fund. The reparation of the tower, the spire, the roof and the south porch should start in early 2014. Behind the church, there is a small graveyard.
- Buckworth Cricket Club, founded in 1958, is situated in Church Road. When the local pub closed, George Brown, a farmer from Buckworth, lent the building to open the cricket club. The last match the club played was in 1984. It is now known as the Clubhouse and can be hired for meetings of the Parish Council or different events. It is at the centre of the village and is used for many purposes, such as a polling station.
- Buckworth School was built in 1870 and was composed of an infant school and a sunday school. It was closed in the late 1950s. It is now used as a private residence.
- The Old Rectory was built in the 1670s. It was the home of vicars up to 1951 and was then sold by Church Commissioners.
- Buckworth Manor, known as The Old Manor House, is a Victorian house, probably built in the 1860s.
- The farms: Home Farm, Manor Farm, Holly Lodge Farm, Brickyard Farm and Park Farm are the five farms situated in the parish.
- Buckworth Wood is located in the west of the parish and is surrounded by farmlands.
