= Yaxley, Cambridgeshire =

Village in Cambridgeshire, England

Coordinates: 52.52°N 0.26°W

Yaxley
- Village
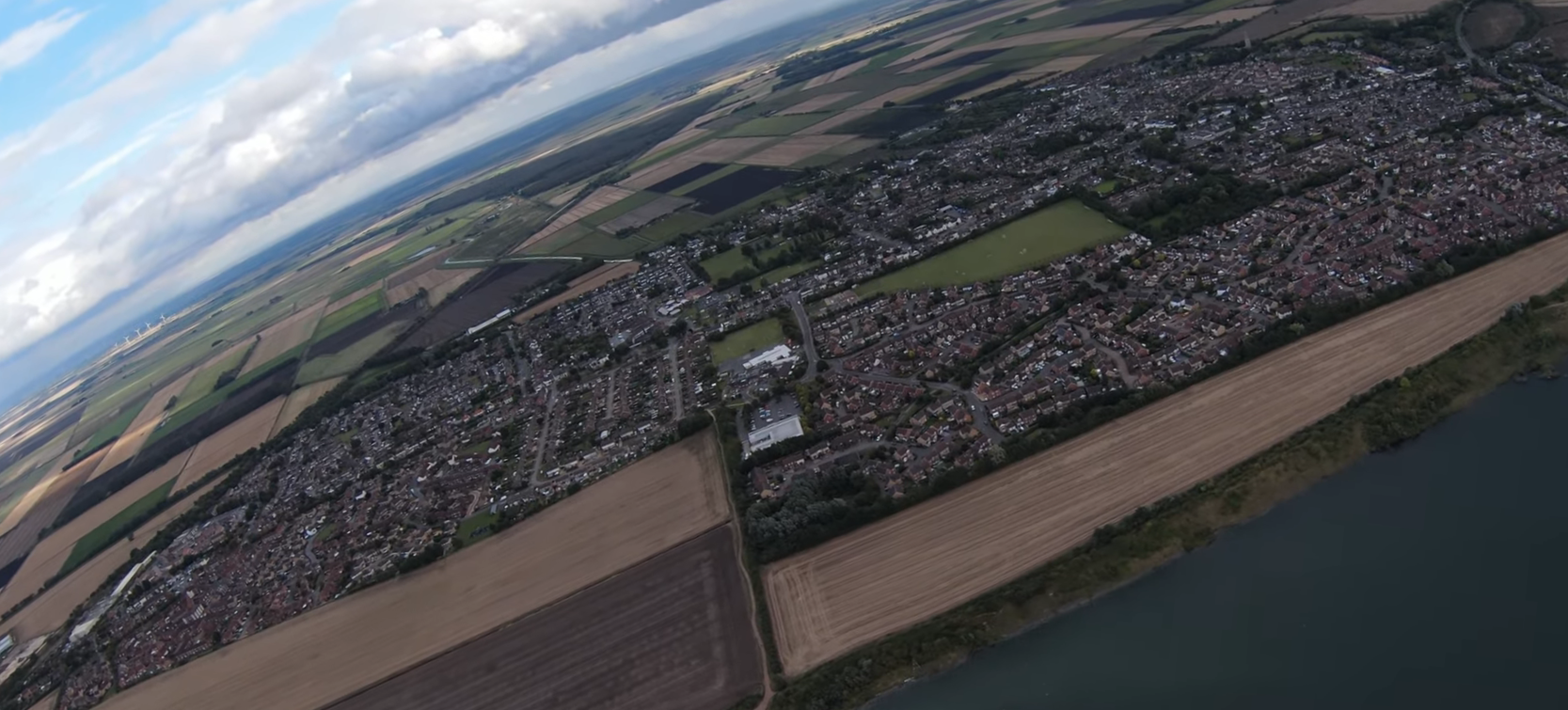
- Aerial view of Yaxley

- Location within Cambridgeshire
- Population: 9,409 (2021)
- OS grid reference: TL185925
- District: Huntingdonshire
- Shire county: Cambridgeshire
- Region: East
- Country: England
- Sovereign state: United Kingdom
- Post town: Peterborough
- Postcode district: PE7
- Dialling code: 01733
- Police: Cambridgeshire
- Fire: Cambridgeshire
- Ambulance: East of England
- UK Parliament: North West Cambridgeshire
- Website: https://www.yaxleyparishcouncil.gov.uk/

Yaxley is a village and civil parish in the Huntingdonshire district in Cambridgeshire, England. Yaxley lies approximately 4 miles (6 km) south of Peterborough, just off the A15 road. The village is located near the Hampton township, and is approximately three miles northeast of junction 16 of the A1(M) at Norman Cross.

== History ==
Yaxley was listed as Lacheslei in the Domesday Book of 1086 in the Hundred of Norman Cross in Huntingdonshire. The name is thought to derive from the Old English geacs (cuckoos) + leah (clearing). In 1086 there was one manor at Yaxley and 39 households.

The Church of England Parish Church of St Peter is a Grade I listed building.

Norman Cross Prison, the earliest known prisoner-of-war camp, was constructed between Yaxley and the villages of Folksworth and Stilton from 1796 to 1797 for the purpose of holding captured troops during the French Revolutionary Wars.

== Government ==
Yaxley is in the parliamentary constituency of North West Cambridgeshire, and elects one Member of Parliament (MP) by the first past the post system of election. Yaxley is represented in the House of Commons by Sam Carling (Labour). The previous members of parliament were Brian Mawhinney (Conservative), who represented the constituency between 1997 and 2005, and Shailesh Vara (Conservative), who represented the constituency from 2005 until 2024.

Yaxley was in the constituency of Huntingdonshire from 1290 until 1885 and again from 1918 until 1965, with it being part of the constituency of Ramsey during the intermittent years. Prior to this, Yaxley was located within the hundred of Norman Cross within Huntingdonshire from as early as the 10th century. From 1965, the village was part of the new administrative county of Huntingdon and Peterborough. In 1974, following the Local Government Act 1972, Yaxley became a part of the county of Cambridgeshire. Yaxley was represented by the rural district of Norman Cross from 1894 until the district was abolished under the Local Government Act 1972.

=== Yaxley Parish Council ===
Yaxley Parish Council

Type
- Type: Parish council

History
- Founded: 1894; 132 years ago

Leadership
- Chair: Andrew Richard Wood
- Vice Chair: David Chapman
- Clerk: Helen Taylor

Structure
- Seats: 17
- Political groups: Nonpartisan: 16 seats Vacant: 1 seat
- Length of term: 4 years

Website
- www.yaxleyparishcouncil.gov.uk

As a civil parish, Yaxley has a parish council. The parish council is elected by the residents of the parish who have registered on the electoral roll; the parish council is the lowest tier of government in England. A parish council is responsible for providing and maintaining a variety of local services including allotments and a cemetery; grass cutting and tree planting within public open spaces such as a village green or playing fields. The parish council reviews all planning applications that might affect the parish and makes recommendations to Huntingdonshire District Council, which is the local planning authority for the parish. The parish council also represents the views of the parish on issues such as local transport, policing and the environment. The parish council raises its own tax to pay for these services, known as the parish precept, which is collected as part of the Council Tax.

=== Huntingdonshire District Council ===
The second tier of local government is Huntingdonshire District Council which is a non-metropolitan district of Cambridgeshire and has its headquarters in Huntingdon. Huntingdonshire District Council has 52 councillors representing 29 district wards. Huntingdonshire District Council collects the council tax, and provides services such as building regulations, local planning, environmental health, leisure and tourism. Yaxley is a part of the district ward of Yaxley and Farcet and is represented on the district council by three councillors. District councillors serve for four-year terms following elections to Huntingdonshire District Council. The current councillors representing Yaxley are Liberal Democrat Andrew Wood, alongside Peter Gammons and James Francis of Reform UK, who were elected in 2026.

=== Cambridgeshire County Council ===
The highest tier of local government is Cambridgeshire County Council which has administration buildings in Cambridge. The county council provides county-wide services such as major road infrastructure, fire and rescue, education, social services, libraries and heritage services. Cambridgeshire County Council consists of 61 councillors representing 59 electoral divisions. Prior to 2017, Yaxley was part of the electoral division Norman Cross. Norman Cross was a district of the Huntingdon and Peterborough County Council from 1965 until it was merged with the Cambridgeshire and Isle of Ely County Council in 1974. Yaxley is now in the electoral division of Yaxley and Farcet and is represented on the county council by one councillor. Yaxley was represented by Terence Crofts before 1977, Michael West from 1977 to 1981, and John Ray Horrell from 1981 to 1997. All three were members of the Conservative Party. Councillor Mac McGuire (Conservative), who previously represented Sawtry from 1985 to 1993, represented Yaxley from 1997 until his death was announced in January 2024. Liberal Democrat Andrew Wood was elected councillor in March 2024, before being replaced by Des Watt of Reform UK after the following election. Watt would later switch his party status to independent in August 2025. In January 2026, Watt would briefly join Advance UK, before again becoming an independent in March. Later that August, Watt joined the Conservative Party.

== Demography ==
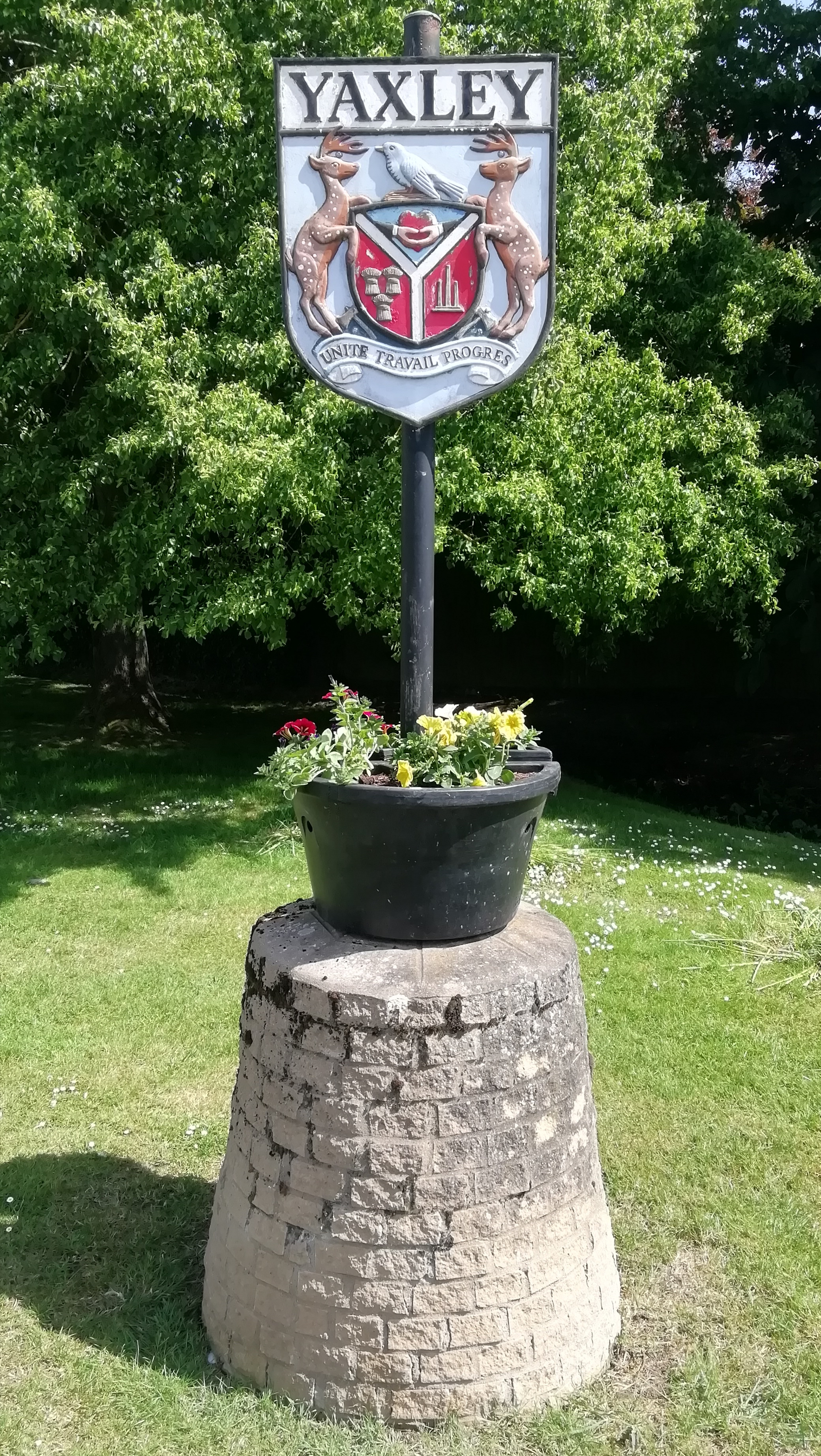
Village sign in Yaxley

=== Population ===
In the period 1801 to 1901 the population of Yaxley was recorded every 10 years by the UK census. During this time the population was in the range of 986 (the lowest was in 1801) and 1,590 (the highest was in 1901).

From 1901, a census was taken every ten years with the exception of 1941 (due to the Second World War). The population at the Census 2011 included Denton.

| Parish | 1911 | 1921 | 1931 | 1951 | 1961 | 1971 | 1981 | 1991 | 2001 | 2011 | 2021 |
|---|---|---|---|---|---|---|---|---|---|---|---|
| Yaxley | 1,697 | 1,792 | 1,934 | 2,761 | 2,690 | 3,943 | 5,962 | 6,922 | 7,413 | 9,174 | 9,409 |

All population census figures from 1911 to 2011 come from Historic Census figures Cambridgeshire to 2011 by Cambridgeshire Insight.

In 2011, the parish covered an area of 3,296 acres (1,334 hectares) and the population density of Yaxley in 2011 was 1781.4 persons per square mile (687.7 per square kilometre).

== Transport ==
Yaxley was once served by Yaxley and Farcet railway station to the east of the village, but it closed in 1959. Current public transport provision consists of a half-hourly bus route to Peterborough city centre, route 5 operated by Stagecoach East which continues to the suburb of Dogsthorpe.

== Sport and leisure ==
Yaxley has a Non-League football club Yaxley F.C., which play at Leading Drove. Yaxley also has a number of Rugby League players who play with Cambridge Lions in Cambridge. Denmark's Speedway World Cup winning captain Niels Kristian Iversen is the village's most famous sporting resident.

The Yaxley to Farcet cycleway was replaced after two young men were hit by a vehicle and killed on the route.

== Notable people ==
- Olinthus Gregory (1774–1841), a mathematician, author and editor; born in Yaxley.
- Peter Burroughs (born 1947), resided in Yaxley, running a shop and later in life becoming an actor.
- Sam Bartle (born 1988 or 1989), better known as Sam Battle or Look Mum No Computer, a musician who is reported to have grown up in Yaxley.

== See also ==
- Yaxley F.C.
