= St Peter's Church, Lutton =

Coordinates: 52.4767261848104°N 0.3639864921569824°W

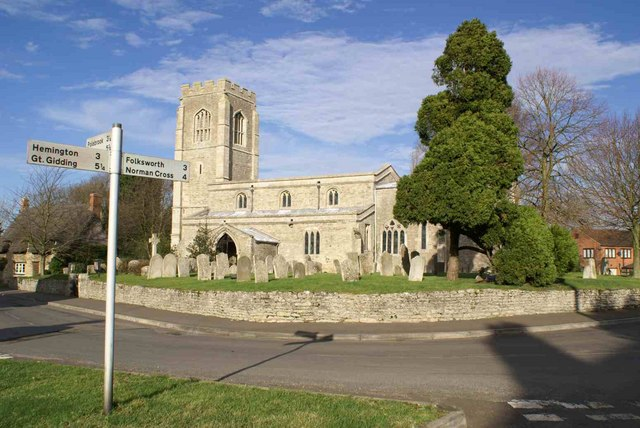
- St Peter's Church, Lutton, from the south

- Location in Northamptonshire
- OS grid reference: TL 112 098
- Location: Lutton, Northamptonshire
- Country: England
- Denomination: Anglican

History
- Status: Parish church
- Dedication: St Peter

Architecture
- Functional status: Active
- Heritage designation: Grade I
- Designated: 1 June 1967
- Architectural type: Church
- Style: Perpendicular, Gothic Revival

Specifications
- Materials: Limestone with ashlar dressings and lead roof

Administration
- Province: Province of Canterbury
- Diocese: Anglican Diocese of Peterborough
- Archdeaconry: Oakham
- Deanery: Oundle
- Parish: Lutton, Northamptonshire

St Peter's Church, Lutton is a Grade I Listed medieval church, which stands on the highest point in the village of Lutton, Northamptonshire, England. It is recorded in the National Heritage List for England as a designated Grade I listed building. It is an active Church of England parish church in the Diocese of Peterborough, the Archdeaconry of Oakham and the deanery of Oundle.

== History ==
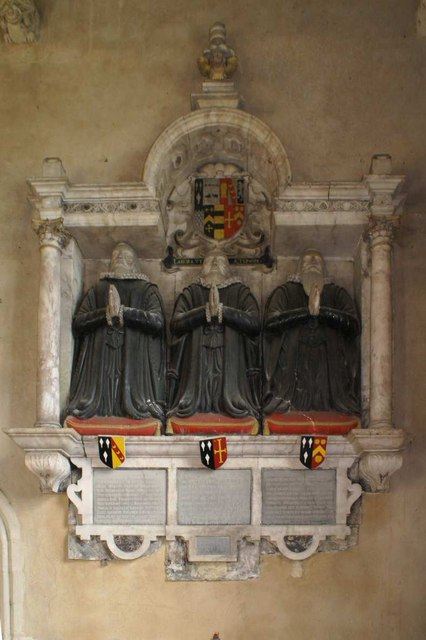
The Apreece brothers monument in the church, c. 1633

The church originates from eleventh century, and was extended until the fifteenth century; with the North aisle added in the thirteenth century, the south aisle in the fourteenth century, and the tower and clerestory dating from the fifteenth century. The church was restored in the nineteenth century. Some masonry may have moved to St Peter's when the nearby church in Washingley was abandoned.

== See also ==
- Grade I listed buildings in Northamptonshire
