= Hundreds of Huntingdonshire =

Administrative districts in the former English county

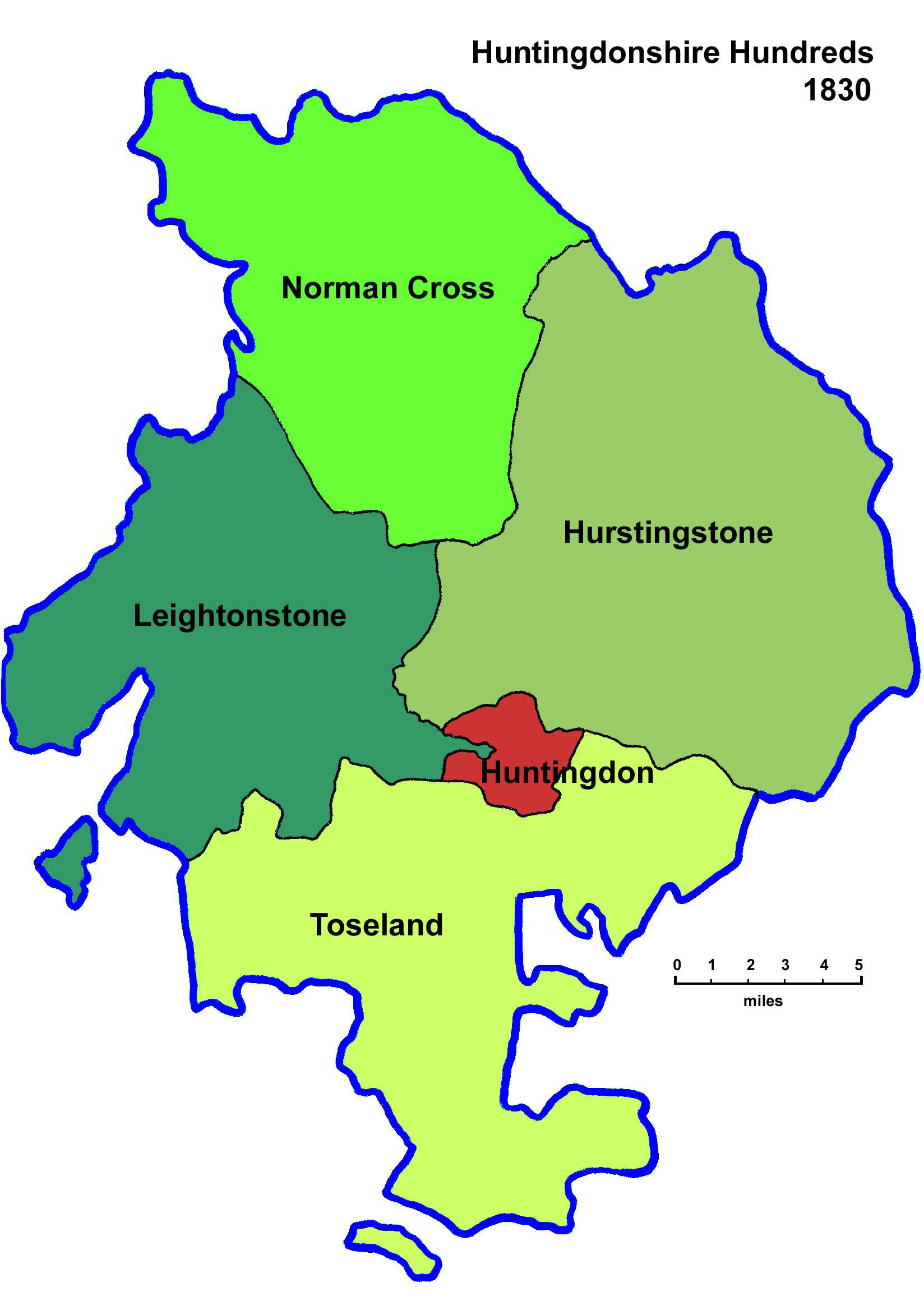
Hundreds of Huntingdonshire in 1830

Between Anglo-Saxon times and the nineteenth century, Huntingdonshire was divided for administrative purposes into four roughly equally-sized hundreds, plus the borough of Huntingdon. Each hundred had a separate council that met each month to rule on local judicial and taxation matters. The four were Norman Cross, Leightonstone, Hurstingstone, and Toseland, which respectively fill the northern, western, eastern and southern quarters of the county.

The hundreds were probably of very early origin, and that of Norman Cross is referred to in 963. The Domesday Survey, besides the four divisions given above, which from their assessment appear to have been double hundreds, mentions an additional hundred of Kimbolton, since absorbed in Leightonstone, while Huntingdon was assessed separately at 50 hides. The boundaries of the county have scarcely changed since the time of the Domesday Survey, except that parts of the Bedfordshire parishes of Everton, Pertenhall and Keysoe and the Northamptonshire parish of Hargrave were then assessed under Huntingdonshire.

== Parishes ==
At the start of the 19th century, the hundreds contained the following parishes:

Hundred	Parishes
Hurstingstone	Abbotts Ripton, Bluntisham, Broughton, Bury, Colne, Earith, Great Raveley, Great Stukeley, Hartford, Holywell with Needingworth, Houghton, Huntingdon, Kings Ripton, Little Raveley, Little Stukeley, Old Hurst, Pidley, Ramsey, St Ives, Sapley, Somersham, Upwood, Warboys, Wistow, Woodhurst, Wyton
Leightonstone	Alconbury, Alconbury Weston, Barham, Brampton, Brington, Buckworth, Bythorn, Catworth, Coppingford, Covington, Easton, Ellington, Grafham, Great Gidding, Hamerton, Keyston, Kimbolton, Leighton Bromswold, Little Gidding, Luddington, Molesworth, Old Weston, Spaldwick, Steeple Gidding, Stow Longa, Swineshead, Thurning, Upton, Winwick, Woolley
Norman Cross	Alwalton, Botolph Bridge, Caldecote, Chesterton, Conington, Denton, Elton, Farcet, Fletton, Folksworth, Glatton, Haddon, Holme, Lutton, Morborne, Orton Longueville, Orton Waterville, Sawtry, Sibson with Stibbington, Stanground, Stilton, Washingley, Water Newton, Woodstone, Wood Walton, Yaxley
Toseland	Abbotsley, Buckden, Diddington, Eynesbury, Fenstanton, Godmanchester, Great Gransden, Great Paxton, Great Staughton, Hail Weston, Hemingford Abbots, Hemingford Grey, Hilton, Little Paxton, Midloe, Offord Cluny, Offord Darcy, St Neots, Southoe, Tetworth, Toseland, Waresley, Yelling

In addition, three detached parishes formed exclaves of Huntingdonshire until they were incorporated into Bedfordshire in the late 19th century, and each was historically part of one of the Hundreds of Bedfordshire. Eaton Socon fell into Barford hundred, Everton in Biggleswade hundred, and Tilbrook in Stodden hundred.

== See also ==
- History of Huntingdonshire
- List of hundreds of England and Wales
