= Norman Cross, Cambridgeshire =

Hamlet in Cambridgeshire

Coordinates: 52.5038°N 0.2908°W

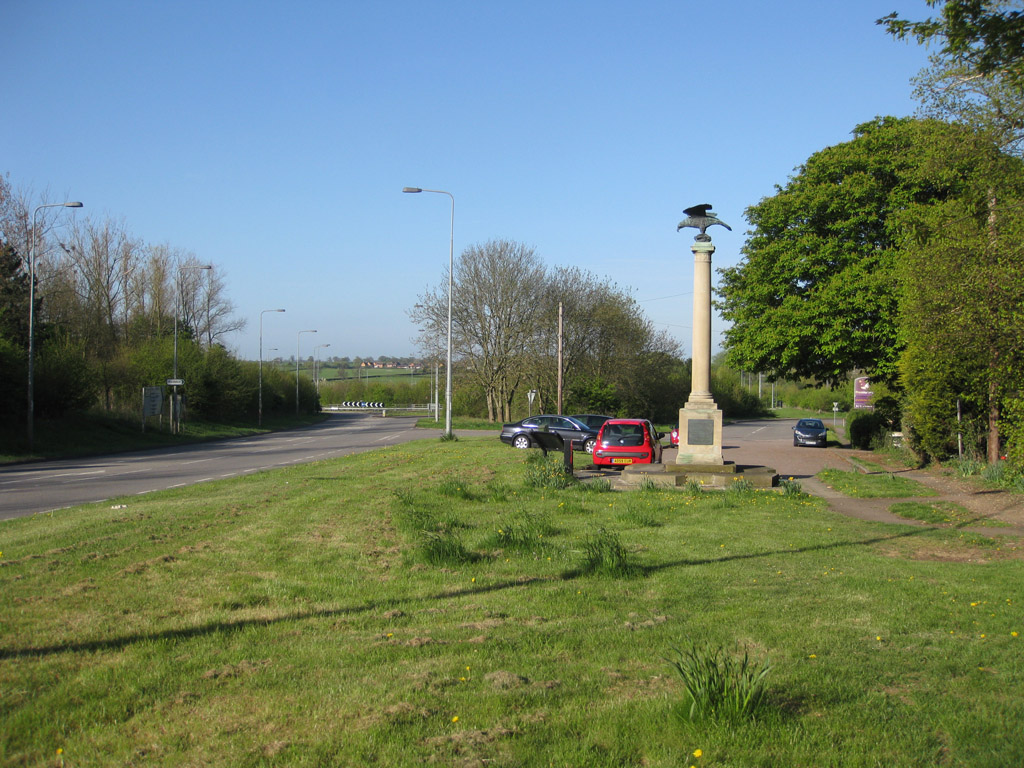
The memorial to the prisoner-of-war camp, seen in 2013

Norman Cross is a hamlet in the Huntingdonshire district of Cambridgeshire, England. It lies south of Peterborough, between the villages of Folksworth, Stilton and Yaxley, and at the junction of the A1 and A15 roads. Traditionally in the county of Huntingdonshire, Norman Cross gave its name to one of the hundreds of Huntingdonshire and, from 1894 to 1974, to Norman Cross Rural District. The hamlet is situated partly in the civil parish of Folksworth and Washingley, west of the A1, and partly in Yaxley parish, to the east.

Norman Cross was the site of one of the earliest purpose-built prisoner-of-war camps, Norman Cross Prison, and a memorial to the prisoners who died there was erected in 1914 and relocated in 2005. It takes the form of a bronze imperial eagle on a column and is grade II listed.

== Norman Cross Hundred ==
Norman Cross was the most northerly of the four Hundreds of Huntingdonshire, the hundreds into which the county of Huntingdonshire was divided. It was named after the cross that stood at the junction of Ermine Street and the road from Yaxley to Folksworth, which was named Norman after a Scandinavian settler or ‘Northman’. According to Imperial Gazetteer of England and Wales it "was known to the Saxons as Northmannescros".
