= Neighbourhood Statistics Service =

British government national statistical service

The Neighbourhood Statistics Service (NeSS) was established in 2001 by the UK's Office for National Statistics (ONS) and the Neighbourhood Renewal Unit (NRU) - then part of the Office of the Deputy Prime Minister (ODPM), now Communities and Local Government (CLG) - to provide good quality small area data to support the Government's Neighbourhood Renewal agenda. This cross-Government initiative also involved the co-operation and partnership of data suppliers across departments, agencies and other organisations. The ONS closed the Neighbourhood Statistics website for England and Wales on the 12 May 2017. To offset this, the ONS is aiming to meet the needs of users via the ONS website, although direct postcode searches are no longer available to users.

The Scottish Government continues to provide local statistics via Statistics.Gov.Scot and Census area profiles.

Neighbourhood statistics for Northern Ireland continue to be made available from the Northern Ireland Neighbourhood Information Service (NINIS).

== Purpose ==
The need for Neighbourhood Statistics can be traced back to the Social Exclusion Unit's 1998 report on deprived neighbourhoods. The absence of information about neighbourhoods produced a series of failings at all levels, with policy makers unaware of the scale and location of problems but when small area information is collected and made easily available, it can radically improve strategies and service delivery.

== Resource ==
NeSS provided a powerful platform through which high quality small area data for England and Wales was disseminated to an expanding audience. It allowed users to paint a statistical pictures of communities at a local level. Neighbourhood Statistics contained datasets covering Health, Housing, Education, Deprivation, Age, Ethnicity and 2011 Census data.
