= Toseland, Cambridgeshire =

Village in Cambridgeshire, England

Coordinates: 52.2471°N 0.1947°W

Toseland
- Toseland Hall

- Location within Cambridgeshire
- Population: 111 (2011. Cambridgeshire Insight)
- OS grid reference: TL232625
- Civil parish: Toseland
- District: Huntingdonshire
- Shire county: Cambridgeshire
- Region: East
- Country: England
- Sovereign state: United Kingdom
- Post town: ST NEOTS
- Postcode district: PE19
- Dialling code: 01480
- Police: Cambridgeshire
- Fire: Cambridgeshire
- Ambulance: East of England
- UK Parliament: Huntingdon

Toseland is a village and civil parish in Cambridgeshire, England. It is in Huntingdonshire which is a non-metropolitan district of Cambridgeshire and a historic county of England. Nearby parishes within Cambridgeshire include Yelling, Graveley, Great Paxton and St Agnes.

== History ==
The name Toseland is Scandinavian and has connections to the Old Norse word lundr, translated as a grove.

Toseland gave its name to one of the four hundreds of Huntingdonshire. Gazetteer John Marius Wilson defined Toseland as:

"a parish and a hundred in Hunts. The parish lies 3¼ miles NE of St. Neots r. station, and is in St. Neots district. Post town, St. Neots. Acres, 1,320. Real property, £1,585. Pop., 217. Houses, 44. The property is divided among a few. The manor-house is a handsome ancient edifice, now occupied by a farmer".

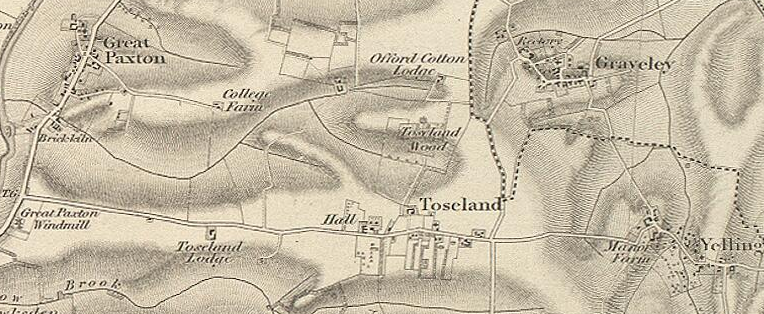
Ordnance Survey map of Toseland in 1835

=== Social status ===
A historic census carried out in 1831 detailed the categorisation of status within occupation in the parish. From the highest to the lowest: Employers, Middling Sorts, Labourers & Servants and others; notably most of the population was Labourers.

=== Landmarks ===
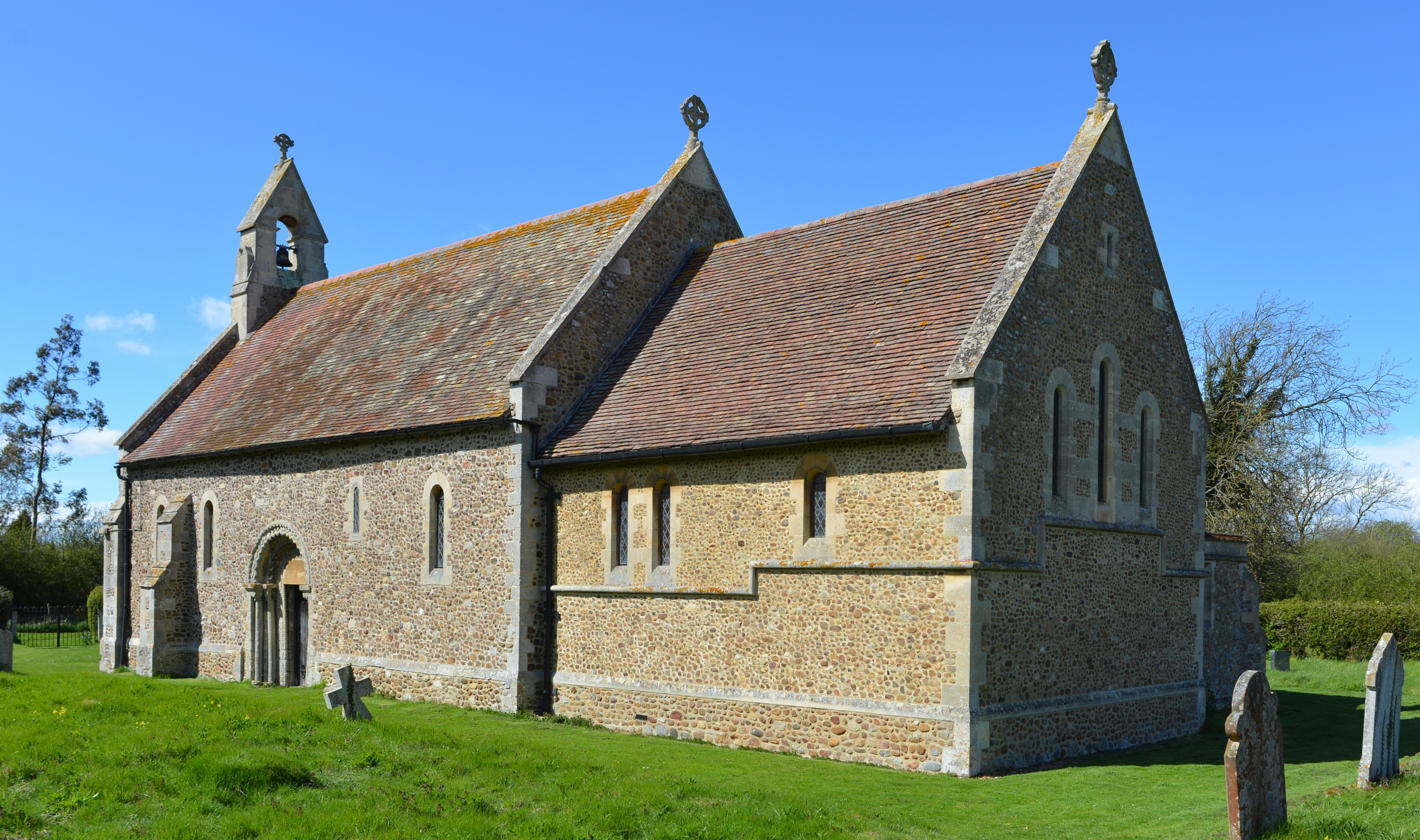
St Michael's Church

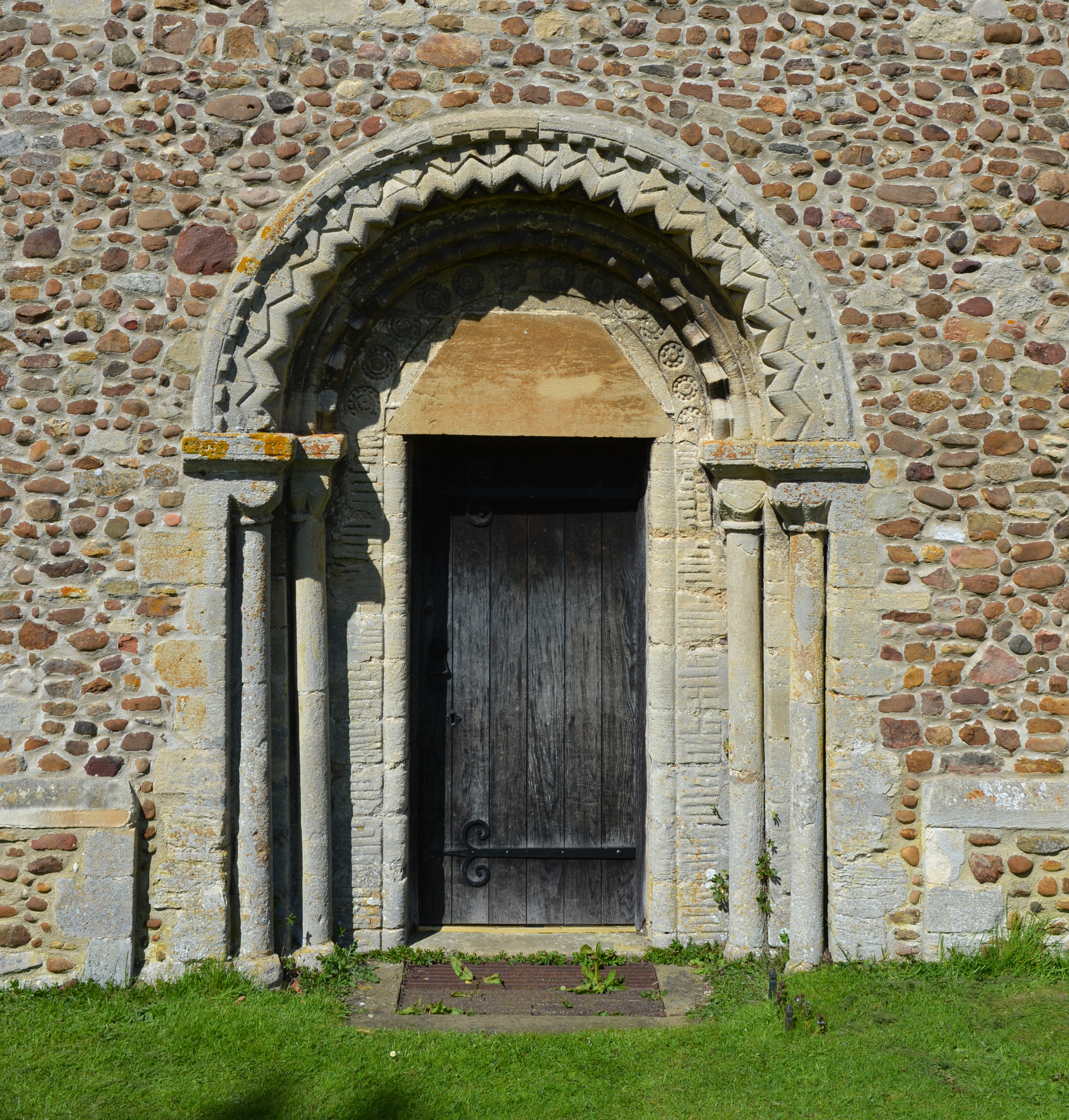
St Michael's mid 12th-century south doorway

The parish church of St Michael (St Mary in earlier records) dates to the 12th century and is Grade II* listed. Toseland Hall is a 17th-century Grade II* listed manor house to the west of the village centre, built from brick with a tiled roof. The Manor is two storeys high and contains attics, and the moulded bricks are constructed with a geometric pattern. It was built by Nicholas Luke around 1600 who at the time was also the lord of the manor, which has been owned by various prominent figures such as the Dean of Ely in 1624. During the 1881 census the property was occupied by Alfred Maine who was a farmer who owned more than 350 acres of land, which since then has been used for agricultural purposes such as cultivating crops.

== Geography ==
The 1900 6-inch Ordnance Survey map showed the parish as having an area of 1342.248 acres. Toseland is situated in the county of Cambridgeshire located in the East of England. The parish is approximately 58 m (190 ft) above the sea level; Toseland's post code (PE19) is categorised as non-residential. Domestic gardens use up most of the land area compared to domestic, non-domestic buildings and roads, taking up approximately 102.13 m^{2} in thousands as shown by the enhanced base map of UK areas in 2005.

== Government ==
Toseland has a parish council, which consists of five councillors and a parish clerk. The parish council meets approximately five times a year. The parish precept for the financial year ending 31 March 2015 was £700.

Huntingdonshire District Council has 52 councillors representing 29 district wards. Huntingdonshire District Council collects the council tax, and provides services such as building regulations, local planning, environmental health, leisure and tourism. Toseland is a part of the district ward of Gransden and The Offords and is represented on the district council by two councillors. The highest tier of local government is Cambridgeshire County Council, Cambridgeshire County Council consists of 69 councillors representing 60 electoral divisions. Toseland is part of the electoral division of Buckden, Gransden and The Offords and is represented on the county council by one councillor. It is in the parliamentary constituency of Huntingdon.

== Demography ==
=== Population ===
In the period 1801 to 1901 the population of Toseland was recorded every ten years by the UK census. During this time the population was in the range of 99 (the lowest was in 1801) and 230 (the highest was in 1851).

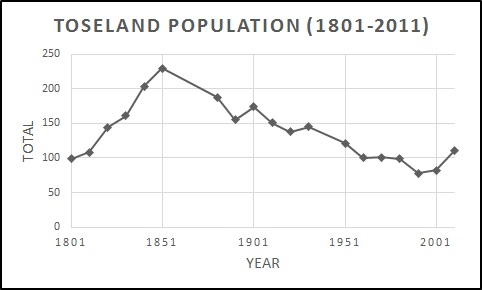
Total population of Toseland obtained from the Historic Census Figures of Cambridgeshire and the Vision of Britain website.

| Parish | 1911 | 1921 | 1931 | 1951 | 1961 | 1971 | 1981 | 1991 | 2001 | 2011 |
|---|---|---|---|---|---|---|---|---|---|---|
| Toseland | 151 | 138 | 145 | 121 | 100 | 101 | 99 | 78 | 82 | 111 |

All population census figures from report Historic Census figures Cambridgeshire to 2011 by Cambridgeshire Insight.

In 2011, the parish covered an area of 1,339 acres (542 hectares) and the population density of Toseland in 2011 was 53.1 persons per square mile (20.5 per square kilometre). According to the 2011 UK neighbourhood statistics census Toseland was listed as part of Yelling and the combined population was recorded as 411.

=== Occupation ===
Sales field at Hollow Farm

In the late 19th century occupations in Toseland were mainly local in nature with the vast majority of jobs being in Domestic Offices/ Services and the least in primary agricultural jobs such as farming, cultivating animals as well as unspecified commodities. Almost half of the known population was unemployed and were women. These figures are documented in the table below sourced from the 1881 Census of England and Wales. As of today most occupations in the parish tend to be professional occupations (make up 29% of the total jobs in the Toseland and Yelling area) especially scientific engineering, technology and telecommunications as well as environmental conservation.

Occupations in Toseland (1881)
| Occupation | Total | Male | Female |
|---|---|---|---|
| Agriculture | 1 | 1 | – |
| Animals | 1 | 1 | – |
| Dealing in Dresses | 2 | 1 | 1 |
| Domestic Offices/ Services | 45 | 43 | 2 |
| Textiles/Fabrics | 4 | – | 4 |
| Unknown Occupation | 4 | – | 4 |
| Unspecified Commodities | 1 | 1 | – |
| Without Specified Occupations | 24 | – | 24 |

All occupation census figures are retrieved from the "1881 Census of England & Wales" via "The Vision of Britain" website.
