= Lutton, Northamptonshire =

Village in Northamptonshire, England

Coordinates: 52.4741°N 0.3599°W

Lutton
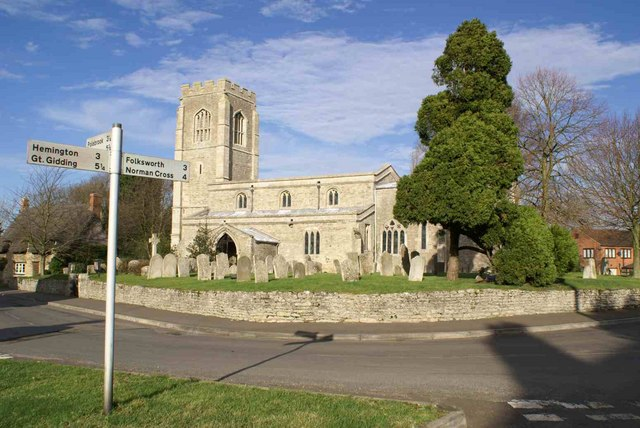
- St Peter's parish church

- Location within Northamptonshire
- Population: 186 (2011 census)
- OS grid reference: TL1187
- Civil parish: Lutton
- Unitary authority: North Northamptonshire
- Ceremonial county: Northamptonshire
- Region: East Midlands
- Country: England
- Sovereign state: United Kingdom
- Post town: Peterborough
- Postcode district: PE8
- Dialling code: 01832
- Police: Northamptonshire
- Fire: Northamptonshire
- Ambulance: East Midlands
- UK Parliament: Corby and East Northamptonshire

Lutton is a village and civil parish in North Northamptonshire, England. The 2011 census recorded its parish population as 186.

The villages name means 'Farm/settlement connected with Luda' or perhaps, 'farm/settlement on Hluding (= the loud one)', an old name for what is now called Billing Brook.

The oldest parts of the Church of England parish church of St Peter are 12th-century. North and south aisles and arcades were added to the nave in the 13th century. There is a fine surviving Easter Sepulchre on the north wall of the chancel. It is a Grade I listed building.
