= Leightonstone =

Coordinates: 52.36°N 0.36°E

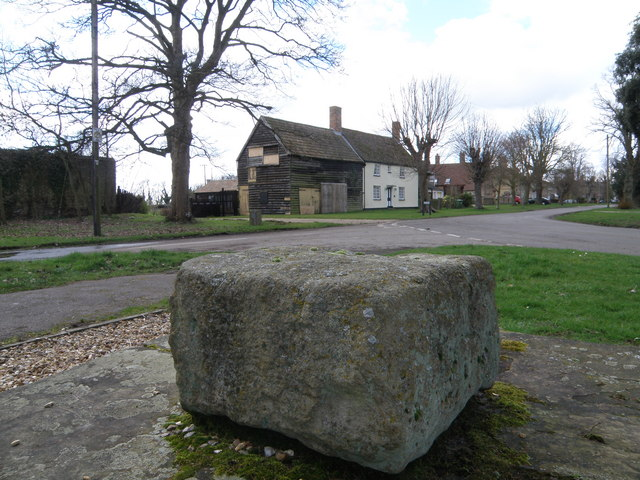
The Leighton Stone

Leightonstone was a hundred of Huntingdonshire mentioned in the Domesday Book of 1086. It took its name from the stone at Leighton Bromswold where the area's moot was held. In modern times it was an ecclesiastical administrative area within the Diocese of Ely.

The Hundred of Leightonstone containing the parishes of Alconbury-Cum-Weston; Barham; Brampton; Brington; Buckworth; Bythorn; Catworth; Copmanford; Covington; Easton; Ellington; Great Gidding; Little Gidding; Steeple Gidding; Grafham; Hamerton; Keyston; Kimbolton; Leighton Bromswold; Molesworth; Spaldwick; Stow Longa; Swineshead; Thurning (part); Tilbrook; Upton; Old Weston; Winwick (part); Woolley.

In two cases in the Domesday Book (in the lands of Eustace the Sheriff, and in those of the Countess Judith), the lands of this hundred are given as in Kimbolton Hundred. It is possible that this may have been an alternative name, but it is more probably due to a mistake of the Domesday scribe.
