= Folksworth and Washingley =

Civil parish in Cambridgeshire, England

Coordinates: 52.493°N 0.320°W

Folksworth and Washingley is a civil parish near Peterborough in Cambridgeshire, England, comprising the villages of Folksworth and Washingley.

The parish was formed following the combination of the two separate parishes of Folksworth and of Washingley between 1931 and 1951.

== Government ==
The civil parish has a parish council, elected by residents of the parish registered on the electoral roll. The parish council is the lowest tier of government in England, responsible for providing and maintaining a variety of local services including allotments and a cemetery; grass cutting and tree planting within public open spaces such as a village green or playing fields. The parish council reviews all planning applications that might affect the parish and makes recommendations to Huntingdonshire District Council, which is the local planning authority for the parish. The parish council also represents the views of the parish on issues such as local transport, policing and the environment. The parish council raises its own tax to pay for these services, known as the parish precept, which is collected as part of the Council Tax. Folksworth and Washingley Parish Council meets at the village hall on the 3rd Tuesday of the month at 7.20pm.

== Demography ==
=== Population ===
In the period 1801 to 1901, the population of Folksworth and Washingley was recorded every ten years by the UK census. During this time the population was in the range of 193 (the lowest was in 1901) and 319 (the highest was in 1841).

From 1901, a census was taken every ten years with the exception of 1941 (due to the Second World War).

Parish	1911	1921	1931	1951	1961	1971	1981	1991	2001	2011
Folksworth	111	119	121							
Washingley	64	57	69							
Folksworth and Washingley	175	176	190	209	291	393	687	765	905	881

All population census figures from report Historic Census figures Cambridgeshire to 2011 by Cambridgeshire Insight.

In 2011, the parish covered an area of 2,194 acres (888 hectares) and so the population (including Morborne) density for Folksworth & Washingley in 2011 was less than 257 persons per square mile (99.2 per square kilometre).
