= Stilton, Cambridgeshire =

Village in Cambridgeshire, England

Coordinates: 52.48915°N 0.29238°W

Stilton
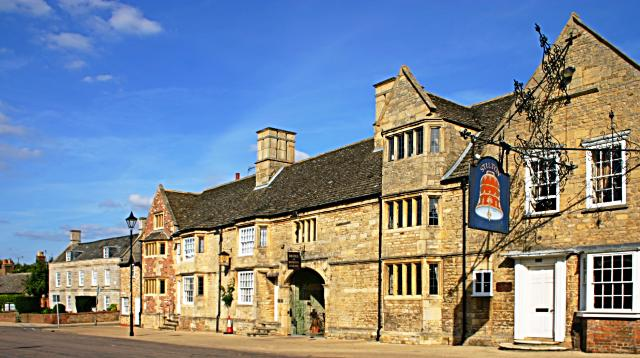
- The Bell Inn

- Location within Cambridgeshire
- Population: 2,455 (2011 census)
- OS grid reference: TL162893
- Civil parish: Stilton
- District: Huntingdonshire
- Shire county: Cambridgeshire
- Region: East
- Country: England
- Sovereign state: United Kingdom
- Post town: PETERBOROUGH
- Postcode district: PE7
- Dialling code: 01733
- Police: Cambridgeshire
- Fire: Cambridgeshire
- Ambulance: East of England
- UK Parliament: North West Cambridgeshire

Stilton is a village and civil parish in Cambridgeshire, England, about 12 miles (19 km) north of Huntingdon in Huntingdonshire, which is a non-metropolitan district of Cambridgeshire as well as a historic county of England. In 2011 the parish had a population of 2,455. The village gave its name to Stilton cheese, although the cheese is no longer made there.

== History ==
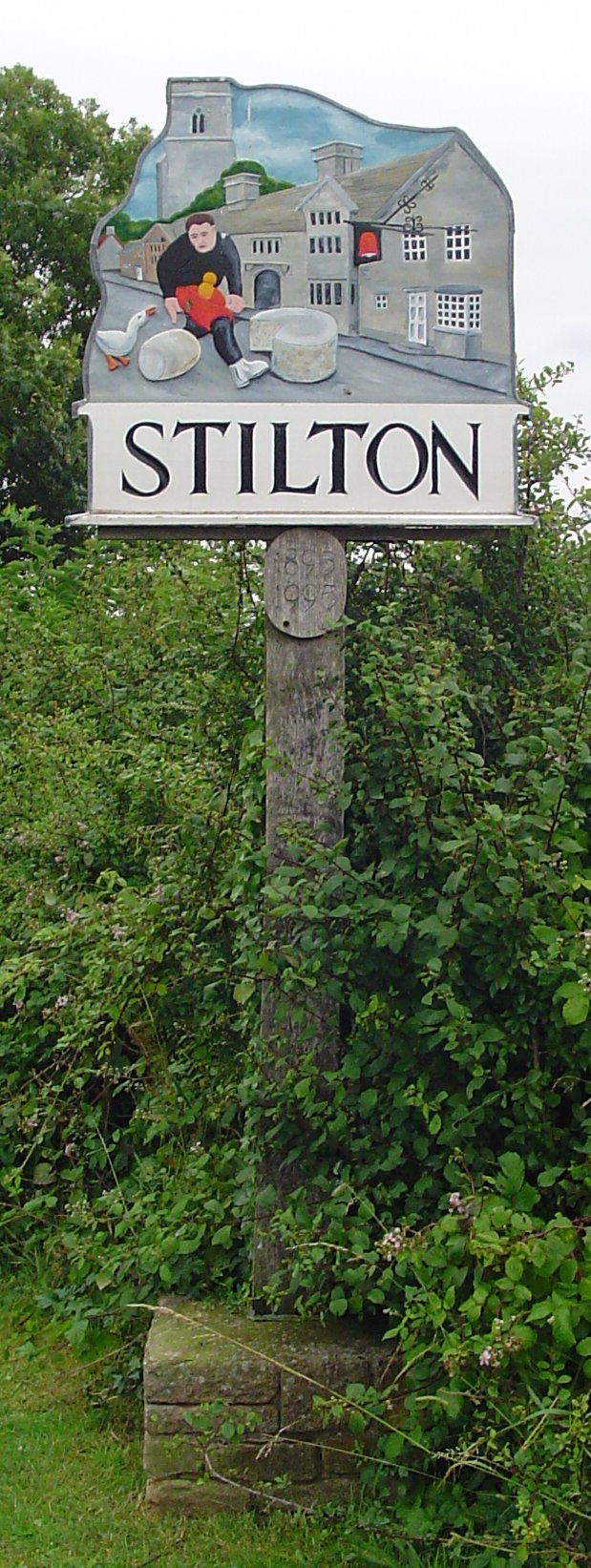
Village sign in Stilton

There is evidence of Neolithic occupation of the parish. The Roman finds dug up in the village include a silver ring and a 2nd-century jug. Archaeologists have also found a potentially Roman settlement in the village and a Roman cheese press.

Stilton was listed in the Domesday Book of 1086 in the Hundred of Normancross in Huntingdonshire; the name of the settlement was written as Stichiltone and Sticilitone in the Domesday Book. In 1086 there were three manors at Stilton; the annual rent paid to the lords of the manors in 1066 had been £4 and the rent was the same in 1086.

The Domesday Book does not explicitly detail the population of a place, but it records that there were ten households at Stilton. There is no consensus about the average size of a household at that time; estimates range from 3.5 to 5.0 persons. Using these figures then an estimate of the population of Stilton in 1086 is that it was within the range of 35–50 people.

The Domesday Book uses a number of units of measure for areas of land that are now unfamiliar, such as hides and ploughlands. In different parts of the country, these were terms for the area of land that a team of eight oxen could plough in a single season and are equivalent to 120 acres (49 hectares); this was the amount of land that was considered to be sufficient to support a single family. By 1086, the hide had become a unit of tax assessment rather than an actual land area; a hide was the amount of land that could be assessed as £1 for tax purposes. The survey records that there were 6.37 ploughlands at Stilton in 1086 and that there was the capacity for a further 1.62 ploughlands. In addition to the arable land, there was 32 acres (13 hectares) of meadows and 10 acres (4 hectares) of woodland at Stilton.

The tax assessment in the Domesday Book was known as geld or danegeld and was a type of land-tax based on the hide or ploughland. It was originally a way of collecting a tribute to pay off the Danes when they attacked England, and was only levied when necessary. Following the Norman conquest, the geld was used to raise money for the king and to pay for continental wars; by 1130, the geld was being collected annually. Having determined the value of a manor's land and other assets, a tax of so many shillings and pence per pound of value would be levied on the land holder. While this was typically two shillings in the pound the amount did vary; for example, in 1084 it was as high as six shillings (30 per cent) in the pound. For the manors at Stilton the total tax assessed was five geld.

In 1086 there was no church at Stilton.

=== Coaching inns ===
The Roman Ermine Street, which later became the Great North Road, was integral to the development of the village. By late medieval times the village was a popular posting station and coaching stop. At one time there were 14 public houses for a population of around 500.

The main inns of the period were the Bell Inn and the Angel Inn, both of which are still in existence. The Bell Inn has been recorded since 1515 and was rebuilt in 1642. The Angel Inn, dating from the early 17th century, was rebuilt as an impressive red brick house in the 18th century. It ceased to be an inn and was badly burned in 1923. Fires also damaged the village as a whole in 1729, 1798 and 1895.

=== Modern times ===
Stilton's reliance on its position on the Great North Road has twice led to problems when use of the road was reduced; the arrival of the railway several miles to the east in the 19th century cut goods transportation along the road, and the opening of a 1.25-mile-long A1 bypass on 21 July 1958 by David Renton, Baron Renton reduced passing trade through the village to almost nil. The bypass was the first from London to Newcastle when the A1 was completely improved in the late 1950s and early 1960s.

The Bell Inn closed and fell into disrepair and the village as a whole lost many businesses. To try to revive interest, on Easter Monday 1962 Tom McDonald of The Talbot and Malcolm Moyer of the Bell Inn organised the first cheese-rolling race along a course near the post office. Held every May Day holiday, it became a popular annual event. In 2018, the race was cancelled due to declining interest and uncontrollable behaviour. The cheese-rolling festival was brought back in 2024.

Listed as Stichiltone or Sticiltone at the time of the 1086 Domesday Book, the name Stilton means "village at a stile or steep ascent".

== Governance ==
As a civil parish, Stilton has a parish council elected by the residents of the parish who have registered on the electoral roll. The parish council is the lowest tier of government in England. Huntingdonshire District Council is the local planning authority for the parish. The parish council raises its own tax to pay for some services, known as the parish precept. This is collected as part of the Council Tax. The parish council consists of twelve councillors and a parish clerk. The parish council normally meets on the second Tuesday of the month (except in August) in the parish meeting room.

Stilton was in the historic and administrative county of Huntingdonshire until 1965. From 1965, the village was part of the new administrative county of Huntingdon and Peterborough. Then in 1974, following the Local Government Act 1972, Stilton became part of the county of Cambridgeshire.

The second tier of local government is Huntingdonshire District Council which is a non-metropolitan district of Cambridgeshire and has its offices in Huntingdon. Huntingdonshire District Council has 52 councillors representing 29 district wards. Huntingdonshire District Council collects the council tax. Stilton is a district ward and is represented on the district council by one councillor. District councillors serve for four-year terms following elections to Huntingdonshire District Council.

For Stilton the highest tier of local government is Cambridgeshire County Council which has administration buildings in Cambridge. The county council provides county-wide services such as major road infrastructure, fire and rescue, education, social services, libraries and heritage services. Cambridgeshire County Council consists of 69 councillors representing 60 electoral divisions. Stilton is part of the electoral division of Norman Cross, which is represented on the county council by two councillors.

At Westminster Stilton is in the parliamentary constituency of North West Cambridgeshire, and elects one Member of Parliament (MP) by the first past the post system of election.

== Geography ==
Stilton lies south of the city of Peterborough, on the old Great North Road, 70 miles (110 km) from London. It lies just south of Norman Cross. In 1998, the village was bypassed by the new A1(M), with access limited to the A15 intersection at Norman Cross.

Stilton is twinned with Saint-Christol-lès-Alès, a community in Gard in the south of France.

== Demography ==
Between 1801 and 1901, the censuses recorded populations for Stilton in the range of 509 (the lowest in 1801) and 817 (the highest in 1841).

From 1901, a census was taken every ten years with the exception of 1941, due to the Second World War.

Parish	1911	1921	1931	1951	1961	1971	1981	1991	2001	2011
Stilton	491	455	494	672	633	911	1,782	2,151	2,425	2,455

All population census figures are from the report Historic Census figures Cambridgeshire to 2011 by Cambridgeshire Insight.

In 2011, the parish covered an area of 1,633 acres (661 hectares), including Folksworth.

== Cheese ==
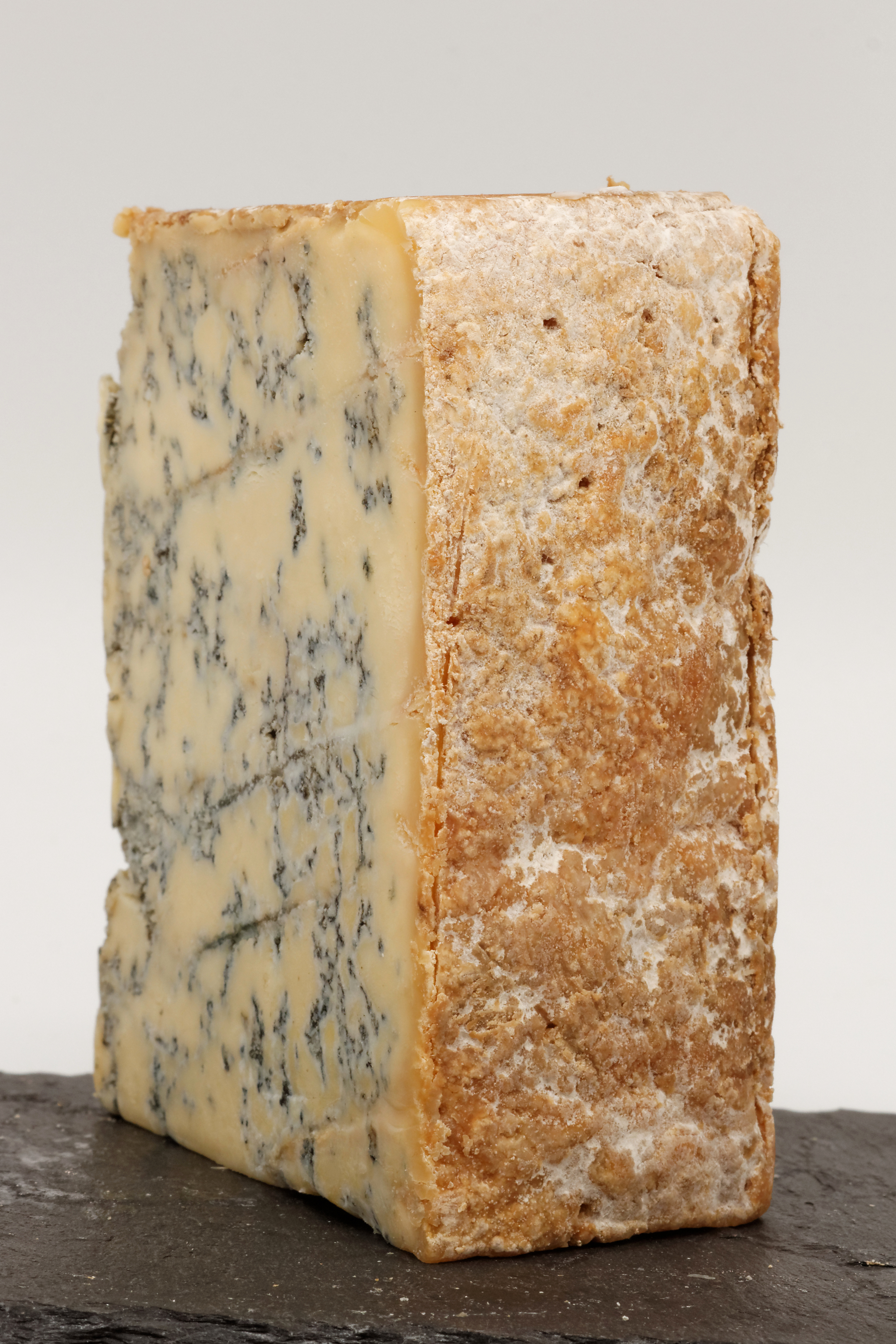
Blue stilton

The village gave its name to Stilton cheese. The most widely accepted explanation is that the cheese came down to be sold at the coaching inns in Stilton. Daniel Defoe in 1722 described the village as famous for its cheese. Traditionally it was thought that supplies were obtained from the housekeeper at Quenby Hall, Hungarton, Leicestershire, near Melton Mowbray, and were sold via her brother-in-law to travellers in Stilton's coaching inns, namely the Bell Inn or the Angel Inn.

Today Stilton is not licensed to make the cheese since it is not located in one of the three counties licensed to do so: Derbyshire, Leicestershire and Nottinghamshire. The manufacturers of Stilton cheese in these counties applied for and received Protected Geographical Status (PGS) in 1996, so that production is currently limited to these three counties and must use pasteurised milk, which can be drawn from many counties within the central belt of England. Recent evidence indicates that it is unlikely that the village would have been a centre for selling of cheese unless cheese was also made in the area. Furthermore, the original recipe for a cream cheese made in Stilton in the early 18th century has since been discovered and since more than one type of cheese was usually made, it is possible that a blue cheese was also made in the area. The Parish of Stilton applied to Defra for an amendment to the Stilton PDO to be included into the Protected area but was unsuccessful. Further attempts to achieve this have been made, supported by Shailesh Vara MP, the Member of Parliament for North West Cambridgeshire, but have so far been unsuccessful.

== Church ==
There is no record of a church in Stilton before the 13th century. The earliest parts of the present Parish Church of St Mary Magdalene date from that period. It consists today of a chancel with vestry and organ chamber, nave, north and south aisles, west tower and south porch most of which was built in the 15th century with the nave arcades 13th century. It is a Grade II* listed building.

== Village life ==
Stilton has its own Church of England primary school. The village has one shop and three pubs: The S Bar (formerly The Stilton Country Club & The Stilton Tunnels), The Bell and The Talbot.
