= 1827 in architecture =

The year 1827 in architecture involved some significant architectural events and new buildings.

== Events ==
- Work begins on the Athenaeum Club, London, designed by Decimus Burton.

== Buildings and structures ==
=== Buildings completed ===
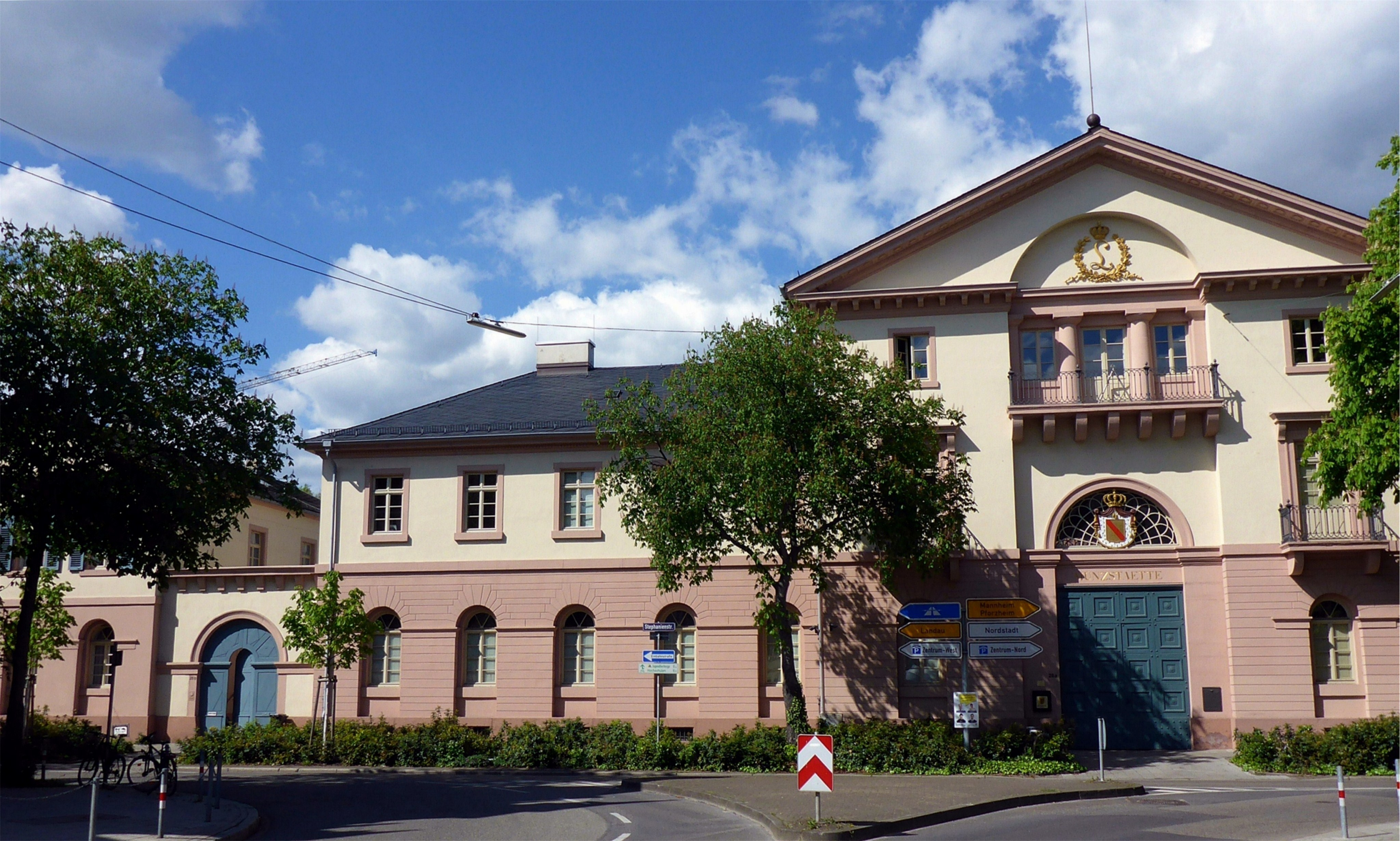
Staatliche Münze Karlsruhe (Karlsruhe Mint), Karlsruhe, Germany

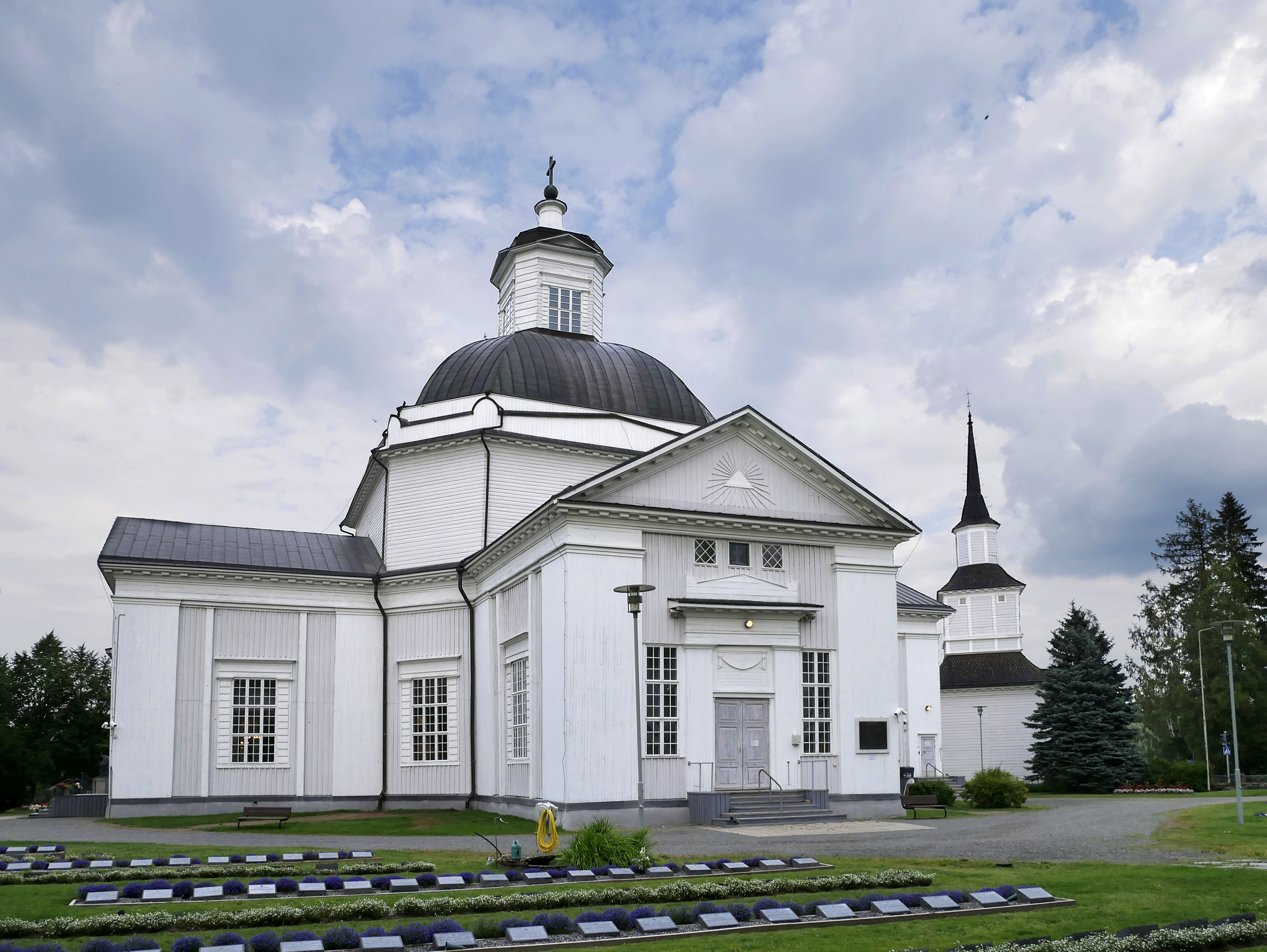
Lapua Cathedral, Finland

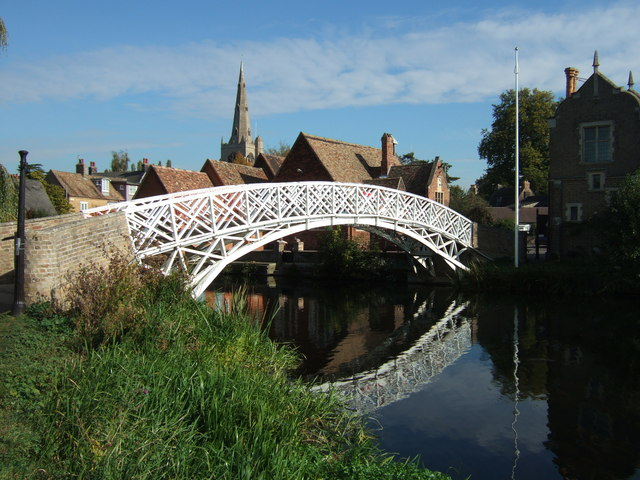
Godmanchester Chinese Bridge, England

- Staatliche Münze Karlsruhe (Baden), designed by Friedrich Weinbrenner (died 1826).
- Sing-Akademie zu Berlin, designed by Carl Theodor Ottmer.
- Old Council House, Bristol (England), designed by Robert Smirke.
- Union Club and Royal College of Physicians, Trafalgar Square, London, designed by Robert Smirke.
- Fireproof Building, Charleston, South Carolina, designed by Robert Mills.
- Mills Building, South Carolina Lunatic Asylum, designed by Robert Mills.
- Naval Medical Center Portsmouth (Virginia), designed by John Haviland.
- Hospital Real de Inválidos Militares de Runa (Portugal).
- Partis College, Bath (England) (almshouses).
- Bank of Louisiana, New Orleans.
- London Colosseum (panorama), designed by Decimus Burton for Thomas Hornor.
- Tremont Theatre, Boston (Massachusetts), designed by Isaiah Rogers.
- Hamburg Stadt-Theater.
- Lapua Cathedral (Finland), designed by Carl Ludvig Engel.
- Holy Trinity Church, Helsinki (Finland), designed by Carl Ludvig Engel, dedicated.
- Christ Church Cathedral (Hartford, Connecticut), designed by Ithiel Town.
- Church of St Mary, Haggerston (London), designed by John Nash, consecrated.
- Yeshua Tova Synagogue, Bucharest (Romania).
- Passage Choiseul (arcade), Paris, designed by Francois Mazois and completed by Antoine Tavernier.
- Halkyn Castle (Wales) (residence), designed by John Buckler.
- Hart-Cluett Mansion, Troy, New York, probably by Martin Euclid Thomson.
- Beckford's Tower, near Bath (England) (folly), designed by Henry Goodridge for William Beckford.
- Godmanchester Chinese Bridge (England), designed by James Gallier.
- Ozimek Suspension Bridge (Poland), designed by Karl Schottelius.
- New stone Shillingford Bridge (across River Thames in England).
- Beam Aqueduct, Rolle Canal, north Devon (England), designed by James Green.

== Awards ==
- Grand Prix de Rome, architecture: Théodore Labrouste.

== Births ==
- January 17 – Samuel Hartt Pook, American naval architect based in Boston (died 1901)
- February 9 – Luigi Fontana, Italian sculptor, painter and architect (died 1908)
- March 14 – George Frederick Bodley, English architect (died 1907)
- May 16 – Pierre Cuypers, Dutch architect associated with Amsterdam (died 1921)
- June 18 – William Hill, English architect associated with Leeds (died 1889)
- August 3 – John Williams Tobey, American architect, carpenter and builder (died 1909)
- September 19 – J. P. Seddon, English architect and designer (died 1906)
- October 15 – Friedrich Adler, German architect and archaeologist (died 1908)

== Deaths ==
- March 11 – John Pinch the elder, English architect associated with Bath, Somerset (born 1769)
- April 27 – John Foster, Sr., English architect, Senior Surveyor to the Corporation of Liverpool and dock engineer (born 1758)
- November 1 – Louis-François Cassas, French landscape painter, sculptor, architect, archaeologist and antiquary (born 1756; stroke)
