= Portholme =

Protected area in Cambridgeshire, England

Coordinates: 52.321°N 0.188°W

- Site of Special Scientific Interest
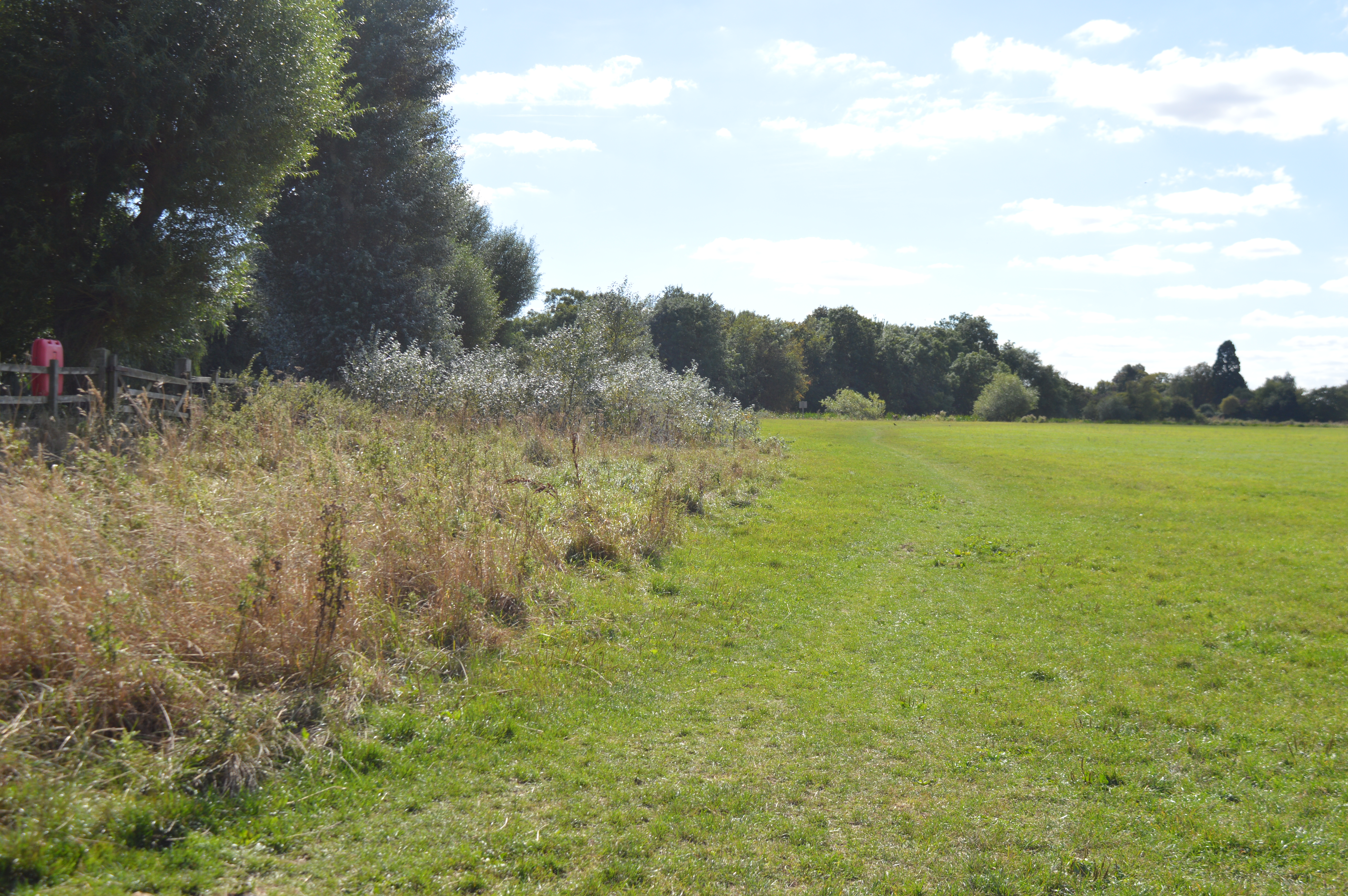
- Location of Portholme.
- Area of search: Cambridgeshire
- Grid reference: TL 236 708
- Interest: Biological
- Area: 106.0 hectares
- Notification date: 1984
- Location map: Magic Map

Portholme (or Port Holme on Ordnance Survey mapping) is a 106-hectare (260-acre) biological Site of Special Scientific Interest in the Parish of Brampton between Huntingdon and Godmanchester in Cambridgeshire, England. It is a Nature Conservation Review site, and a Special Area of Conservation.

The site is an alluvial flood meadow, and one of the largest areas of grassland which is still traditionally managed as a Lammas meadow. Watercourses have some unusual invertebrates, including the nationally restricted dragonfly Libellula fulva. The meadow is managed by cutting followed by grazing, and it is flooded in winter and early spring.

...to my father, poor man, and walked with him up and down the house — it raining a little, and the waters all over Portholme and the meadows, so as no pleasure abroad.

— The Diary of Samuel Pepys, 24 May 1668

There is access by road from Mill Common, Huntingdon. and on foot via the Ouse Valley Way from Godmanchester Chinese Bridge or Bromholme Lane, Brampton.

In 1910, James Radley, an early aviation pioneer based in Bedford believed that the flat areas of the Portholme Meadow, shielded from winds, and accessible to local towns, were ideal for take-off and landing as well as demonstrating to an enthused public the wonder of flight. Having acquired a Beleriot monoplane, on 19 April 1910, with almost the whole population of Huntingdon, Godmanchester, and Brampton watching, Radley took off and flew circuits of the meadow to the amazement of the local crowds. Radley's aircraft was able to complete a 16.5 mile circuit of the meadow at an altitude of 40 feet in just under 24 minutes - just over 41 miles per hour.

Between April and October 1918, the meadow was used as a Training Depot Station (designated No. 211 TDS) by the Royal Air Force. Aircraft were moved to RAF Scopwick in October 1918.

For clarification the feature is commonly mapped geographically, with two words: Port, and "Holme" meaning island. The SSSI was specifically named "Portholme". This includes Port Holme Meadow, Bromholme Field and Alconbury Island within its border, all are linked by public footbridges. Both spellings have been used for over 100 years and both are used in Huntingdonshire Local Plan to 2036.
