= Godmanchester Town Hall =

Municipal building in Godmanchester, Cambridgeshire, England

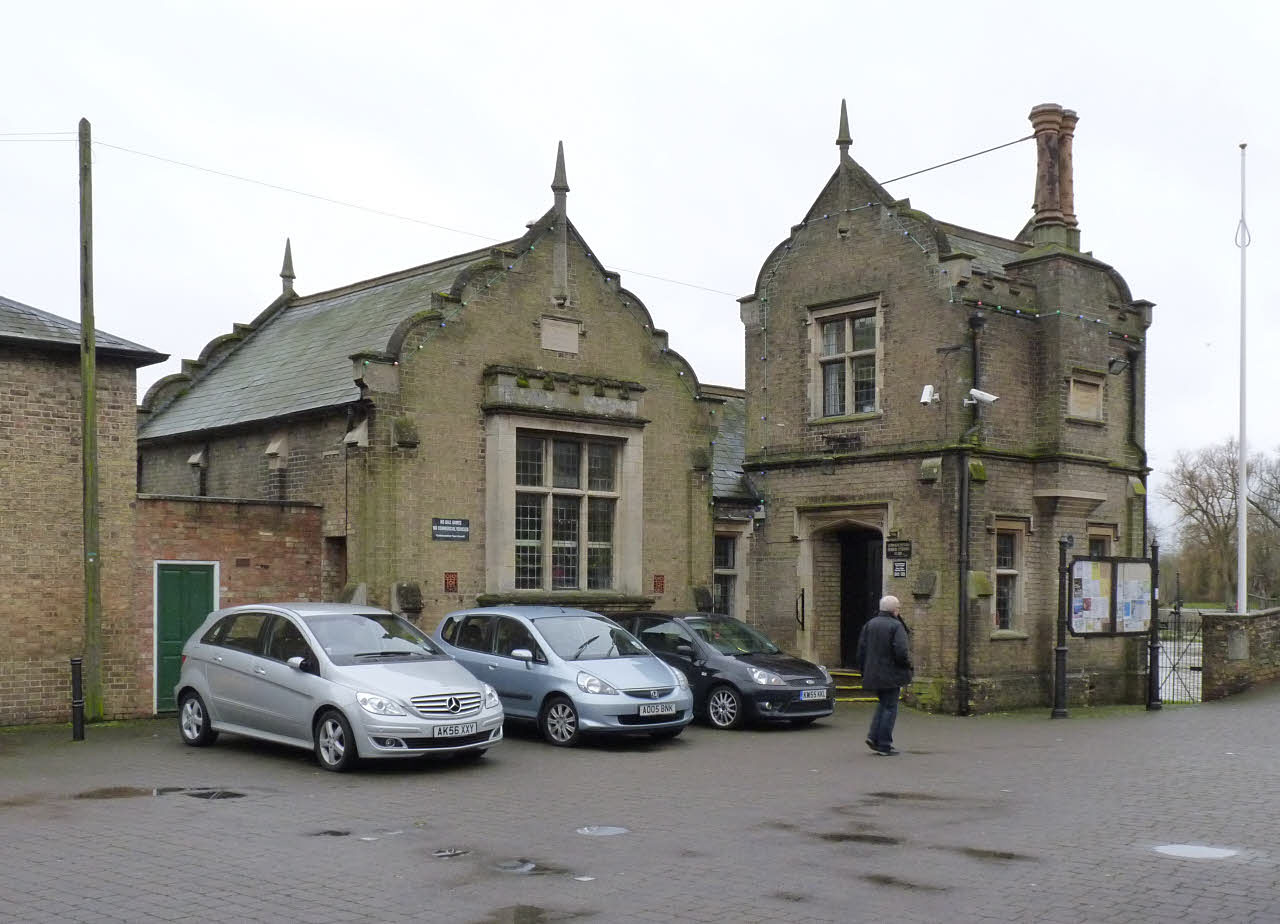
- Godmanchester Town Hall with the original building on the left and the later extension on the right

- Shown in Cambridgeshire
- 52.3192°N 0.1755°W
- Location: The Causeway, Godmanchester

History
- Built: 1844

Site notes
- Architectural style: Jacobean style

Listed Building – Grade II
- Official name: Godmanchester Senior Citizens Club
- Designated: 29 May 1969
- Reference no.: 1161502

Godmanchester Town Hall is a municipal building in The Causeway, Godmanchester, Cambridgeshire, England. The town hall, which was the meeting place of Godmanchester Borough Council, is a Grade II listed building.

== History ==
Although the town was incorporated under a royal charter from King James I in 1604, it was not until the implementation of the Municipal Corporations Act 1835, which saw the town's two bailiffs replaced by an elected council, that the new borough leaders decided to commission a town hall. The site they selected was on the east bank of the mill lade, a backwater to the River Great Ouse: the necessary preliminary works involved raising The Causeway by 2 feet (0.61 m).

The foundation stone for the original building was laid by the mayor, Edward Martin, in 1844. It was designed in the Jacobean style and built in gault brick with stone dressings. The design involved a symmetrical main frontage of one bay facing north, with a three-light mullioned and transomed window surmounted by a Dutch gable and a finial. Following an increase in the responsibilities of the council in the late 19th century, council leaders decided to commission an extension on a site to the west of the original building. The foundation stone for the extension was laid by the mayor, William Gadsby, in 1899. It again involved just one bay, this time facing east, with a doorway on the ground floor and a two-light mullioned and transomed window on the first floor, again surmounted by a Dutch gable and a finial. Internally, the principal room was the main hall: a wooden board listing the names of all past mayors was installed there in 1911.

The building continued to serve as the headquarters of the borough council, but ceased to be the local seat of government after the enlarged Huntingdon and Godmanchester Borough Council was formed at Huntingdon Town Hall in 1961. The building subsequently became the home of the Godmanchester Senior Citizens Club: functions organised by the club included whist drives, bingo games and formal dinners for senior citizens living in the area.

In 1998, the building also became the offices of the Godmanchester Town Council, which took over a room, previously used for storage, on the first floor of the extension. In December 2020, a display of lights was projected on the town hall as the culmination of activities associated the local Festival of Lights that year. Remembrance Day marches, held in November each year, have traditionally started from the town hall and moved north up Post Street before arriving at the Godmanchester War Memorial in time for the memorial service.
