= Houghton Meadows =

Nature reserve in Cambridgeshire, England

Coordinates: 52.327°N 0.104°W

Houghton Meadow
- Site of Special Scientific Interest
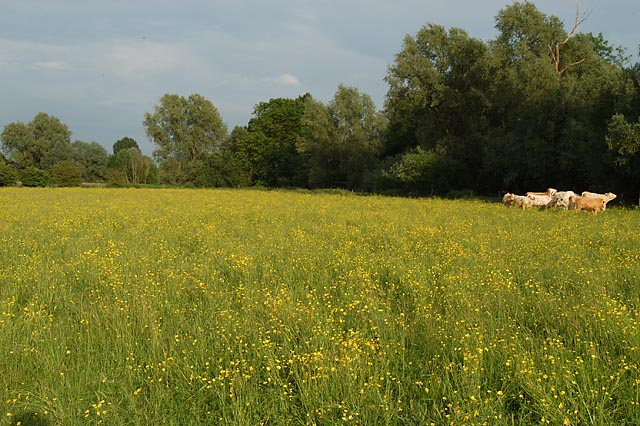
- Location of Houghton Meadow.
- Area of search: Cambridgeshire
- Grid reference: TL 293 716
- Interest: Biological
- Area: 4.7 hectares
- Notification date: 1984
- Location map: Magic Map

Houghton Meadows is a 4.7-hectare (12-acre) biological Site of Special Scientific Interest (SSSI) between Houghton and St Ives in Cambridgeshire. The SSSI covers three meadows south of Thicket Road; they are part of the 8-hectare (20-acre) Houghton Meadows nature reserve, which is owned and managed by the Wildlife Trust for Bedfordshire, Cambridgeshire and Northamptonshire, and which also includes Browns Meadow to the south.

Some of these fields are pasture and others are hay meadows, and they display ridges and furrows from medieval ploughing. They are a type of neutral grassland which is declining nationally. Flowers include cowslips and yellow-rattles, and there are fauna such as green woodpeckers and great crested newts.

There is access from the Ouse Valley Way, which runs along Thicket Road.
