= Godmanchester =

Town in Cambridgeshire, England

Coordinates: 52.3176°N 0.1725°W

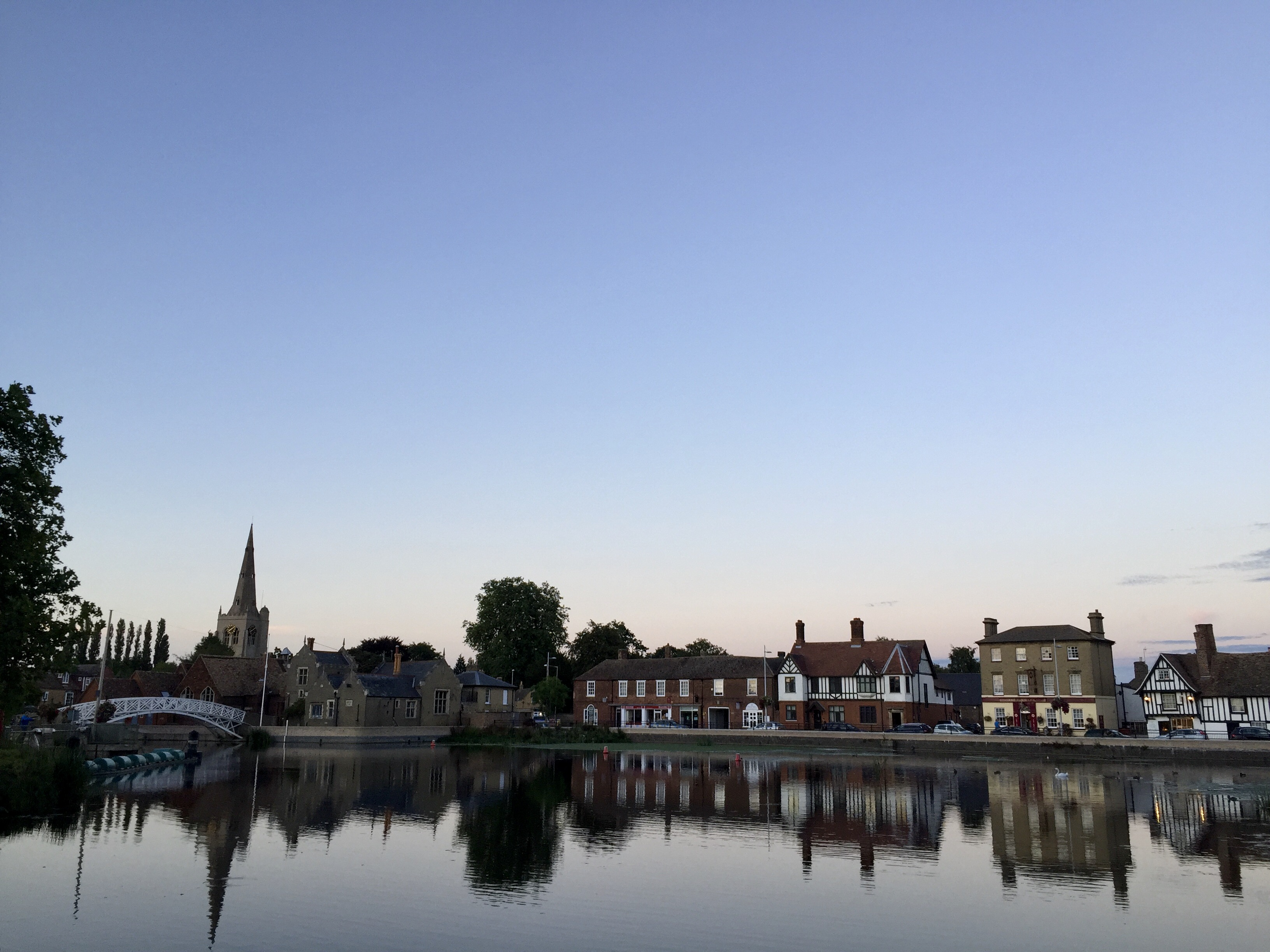
- Godmanchester's Causeway, which overlooks the River Great Ouse

- Location within Cambridgeshire
- Area: 1.983 km^{2} (0.766 sq mi) civil parish
- Population: 7,893 (2021)
  - Density: 3,980/km^{2} (10,300/sq mi)
- OS grid reference: TL245704
  - London: 56 miles (90 km)
- Civil parish: Godmanchester
- District: Huntingdonshire
- Shire county: Cambridgeshire
- Region: East
- Country: England
- Sovereign state: United Kingdom
- Post town: HUNTINGDON
- Postcode district: PE29
- Dialling code: 01480
- Police: Cambridgeshire
- Fire: Cambridgeshire
- Ambulance: East of England
- UK Parliament: Huntingdon

Godmanchester (/ˈɡɒdməntʃɛstər/ GOD-mən-ches-tər) is a town and civil parish in the Huntingdonshire district of Cambridgeshire, England. It is separated from Huntingdon, 1 mile (1.6 km) to the north, by the valley of the River Great Ouse. Being on the Roman road network the town has a long history. It has a waterside location and is surrounded by open countryside of high value for its biodiversity but it remains highly accessible, with a railway line to London, the A1 road and M11/A14, which run nearby.

== Toponymy ==
The name ‘Godmanchester’ is first attested as Godmundcestre in Domesday Book of 1086 and subsequently variously appears as Gutmuncetre, Gudmencestre, Gudmundcestria, Gum(m)uncestre, Gumencestre, Guncestre, Gumcestria, Gumecestre, Gommecestre, Gomecestria, Gummecestre, Gurmund(es)cestre, Gormecestre, Gormancestre, Gomecestre, Gunnecestre, Gurmecestre, Godmechestre, Gurminchestre, Gumchestre, Gurmencestre, Gumcestre, Gumestre, Godmonchestre, Gumecestur and Gumycestre.

The first part of the name comes from an Anglo-Saxon personal name, either Guðmund or Godmund. Godmund is also the basis of the place names Goodmanham (East Riding of Yorkshire) and Gumley (Leicestershire). Later forms of these names occur with a spelling Guth- or Gut-. The second part of the name refers to the Roman fort or 'chester' (from the Latin castrum) south of the River Ouse, identified with the Durovigutum mentioned in the Antonine Itinerary.

There is no etymological or historical connection between the town and the Danish King Guthrum of East Anglia (c. 835–890) nor with the Goths, a Germanic people of central and eastern Europe.

A minority of visitors, former residents and residents continue to pronounce the placename as GUM-stər, though this has long since been superseded by GOD-mən-ches-tər, with stress on the first syllable.

== History ==
The town is on the site of the Roman town of Durovigutum. There is archaeological evidence of Celtic and earlier habitation prior to the establishment of a key Roman town and a mansio (inn), so the area has probably been continuously occupied for more than 2,000 years. In contrast to Huntingdon, archaeological finds have been extensive in the centre of Godmanchester. The town has two conservation areas showing architecture from the last 400 years. More than 100 private listed buildings, including many timber-framed Tudor houses, may be seen, the largest being Tudor Farm, dating from 1600 and restored in 1995.

=== Pre-Roman ===
The remains of a 6.3-hectare (16-acre) neolithic temple of considerable importance, carbon dated to 3685–3365 cal BCE and aligned to the Beltane sunrise, were documented on the edge of Godmanchester. The site between the town and the village of Hemingford Abbots has been exposed to gravel extraction. The location is likely to have been originally settled due to the gravel beds providing a ford across the River Great Ouse.

=== Post-Roman ===
The Roman settlement was at a crossroads of: Ermine Street (from London to York); the Via Devana (from Colchester through Cambridge to Chester); and a military road from Sandy, Bedfordshire. Archeological discoveries include a basilica, a bathhouse, temple, a mansio, one of the largest in the UK, other villas, farmsteads and a hoard of jewellery, suggesting a population of up to 3000 people. The end of the third century saw a catastrophic contraction of the Roman town, probably following an attack by Anglo-Saxon raiders.

The town's prosperity since the Romans has been closely tied to its strategic position on the old Roman road from London to York. It is suggested that in the Middle Ages the Danes allowed development of an inland port by digging the Mill Lade.

The place was listed as Godmundcestre in Domesday Book of 1086 in the hundred of Leightonstone in Huntingdonshire. The survey records that there were 26 ploughlands, with capacity for a further 31, and in addition to the arable land there were 160 acres (65 hectares) of meadows, 50 acres (20 hectares) of woodland, three water mills, a church and a priest.

Godmanchester was first recognised with a town charter by King John in 1212, although it had been a market town and royal manor for some years. King James I granted a second Royal Charter in 1604.

Farm Hall, a Grade II* listed building on West Street, was used as a bugged detention centre for German nuclear scientists as part of Operation Epsilon, from July 1945 to January 1946. The plot was produced as a West End play in 2023.

== Governance ==
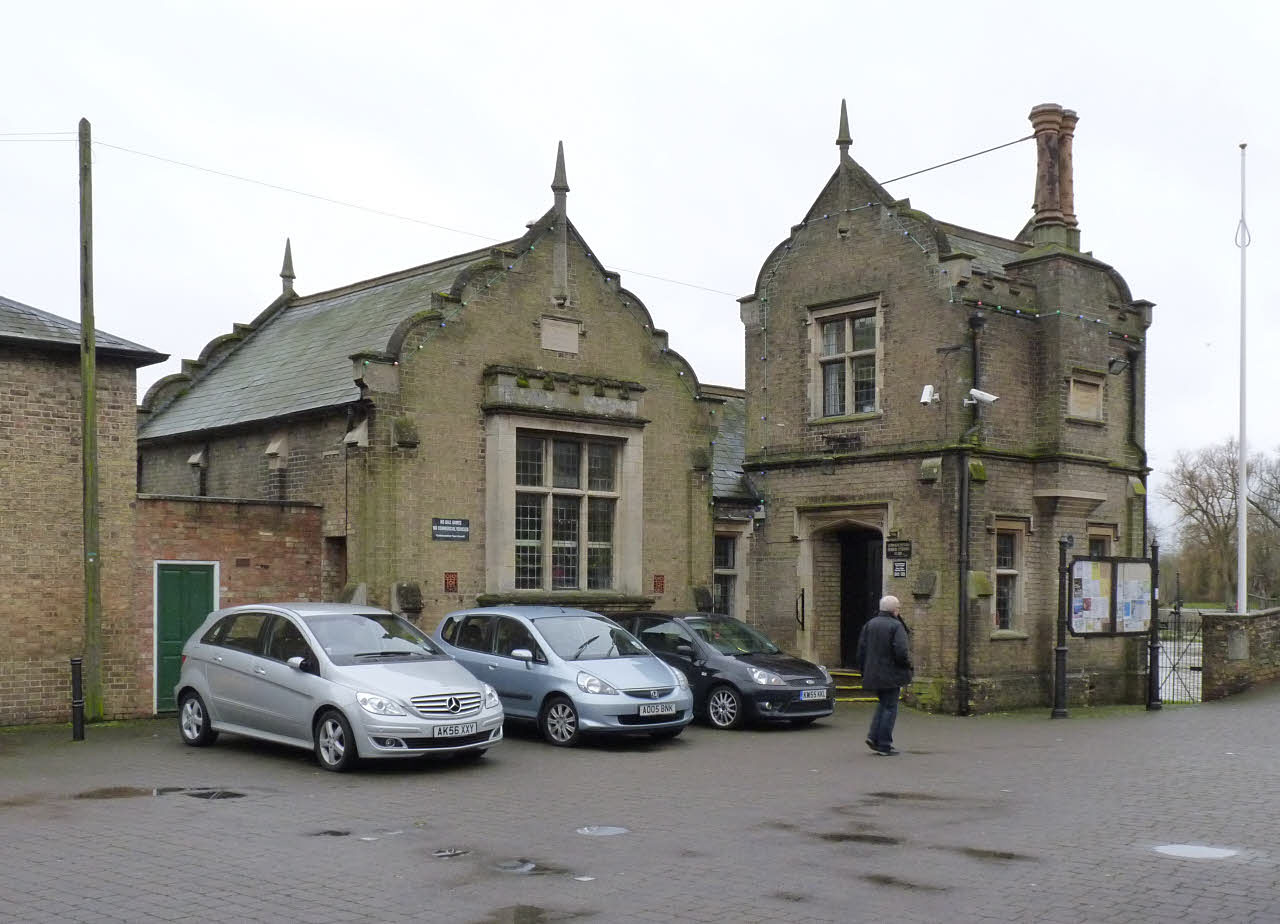
Godmanchester Town Hall

Godmanchester was a municipal borough based at Godmanchester Town Hall in the county of Huntingdonshire until 1961. It was then part of the borough of Huntingdon and Godmanchester until 1974. At county level, the town was in Huntingdonshire until 1965, when it became part of the new administrative county of Huntingdon and Peterborough. In 1974 the relatively diminutive, county of Huntingdon and Peterborough was absorbed into the administrative county of Cambridgeshire.

The highest tier of local government is Cambridgeshire County Council. Two county councillors are elected from the Godmanchester and Huntingdon East electoral division.

The second tier of local government, the planning authority and council-tax collecting body, is Huntingdonshire District Council, a non-metropolitan district. Two councillors represent the Godmanchester ward.

The third and lowest tier of local government is Godmanchester town council. The council consists of 17 councillors, including a mayor and a deputy mayor.

Godmanchester is represented in the parliamentary constituency of Huntingdon, in the House of Commons. Ben Obese-Jecty (Conservative) was elected as MP in 2024, replacing Jonathan Djanogly.

== Demography ==
=== Population ===
Since 1801 the population has been recorded every ten years by the UK census, the only exception being in 1941 owing to the Second World War. In the 19th century the population ranged from 1,573 (in 1801) to 2,438 (recorded in 1861).

The fastest growth, an 81% increase in population, was between 1981 and 1991

Population figures since 1911 are:

Parish	1911	1921	1931	1951	1961	1971	1981	1991	2001	2011	2021
Godmanchester	2,130	2,035	1,993	2,502			2,955	5,255	5,996	6,711	7,893
Population census figures from report Historic Census figures Cambridgeshire to 2011 by Cambridgeshire Insight. The censuses of 1961 and 1971 are omitted since Huntingdon and Godmanchester were merged into a single municipal borough.

In 2021 the parish covered an area of 4,900 acres (1,983 hectares) and so the population density for Godmanchester in 2021 was 10,300 per square mile (3,980 per square kilometre).

By 2016 Godmanchester had a population of about 6800 in 3,100 homes; it is expected that this will further increase to at least 4050 homes and 8600 residents by 2036.

== Culture and community ==
The town has a waterside location surrounded by open countryside of high value for its biodiversity, agricultural land value, scenic beauty and landscape quality.

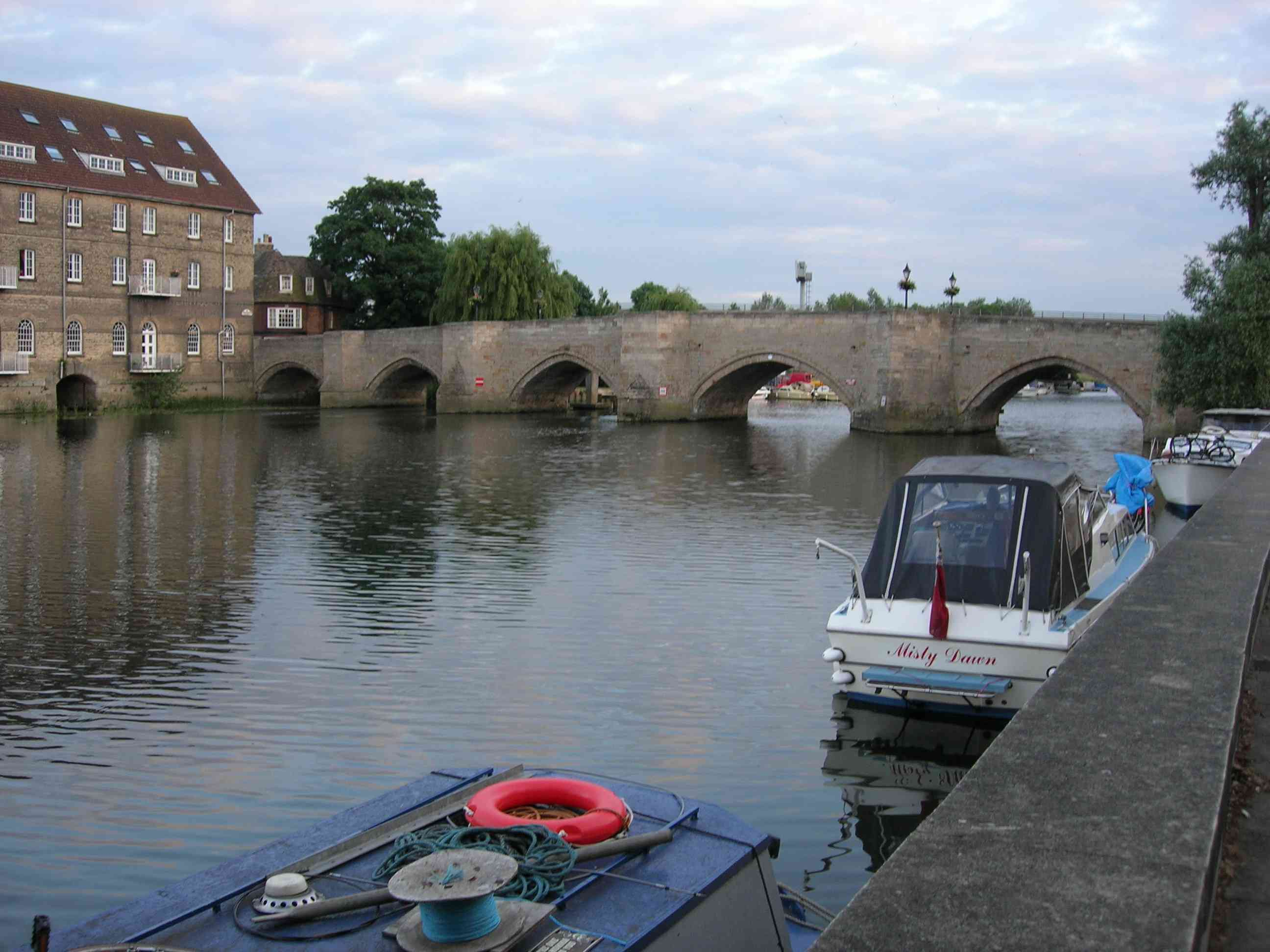
The Old Bridge

There are several bridges across the Great Ouse to Huntingdon. The Old Bridge, Huntingdon, a historic, medieval bridge, was the only road until 1975. In that year the original bypass route, now used as a local road, was built. Pedestrian traffic across the river is principally served by three footbridges.

England's largest meadow, Portholme, can be reached from Godmanchester or Huntingdon but lies in the parish of Brampton. It remains an important flood plain but has served as an equestrian racecourse and centre for early aviation.

To the North and East of the town are West and Eastside Common (SSSI) and Godmanchester Nature Reserve. These commons are intersected by The Ouse Valley Way and Pathfinder Way long-distance footpaths and the route of a disused railway, which connected the demolished Godmanchester Station and St Ives.

South of the town centre are the headquarters and a large operational shelter of the veterinary/rescue charity Wood Green Animal Shelters.

A number of small businesses, DHL and Coop warehouses are situated on the southern edge of the town, on Chord Business park, Roman Way Industrial Estate and Cardinal Business Park.

Original historical documents relating to Godmanchester, including the original church parish registers, local government records, maps, photographs and the surviving borough charters, are held by Cambridgeshire Archives and Local Studies at the County Record Office, Huntingdon.

== Landmarks ==
=== Church of St Mary the Virgin ===
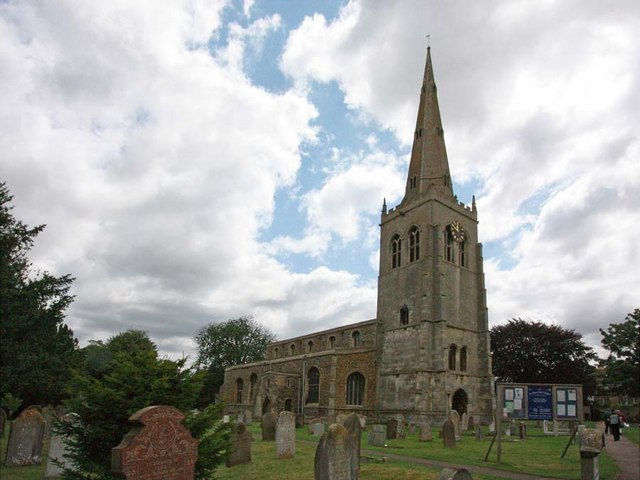
Church of St Mary the Virgin

The Church of St Mary the Virgin is a Church of England parish church and is a Grade I listed building, with its earliest phase dating to the 13th century. Most of the structure is of 13th- to 15th-century date but the tower was built in 1623. The stalls with misericords date from the late 15th century.

In October 2003 BBC1's Songs of Praise was hosted by St Mary's and featured the new hymn tune Godmanchester, written by the then vicar, Peter Moger.

=== Chinese Bridge ===
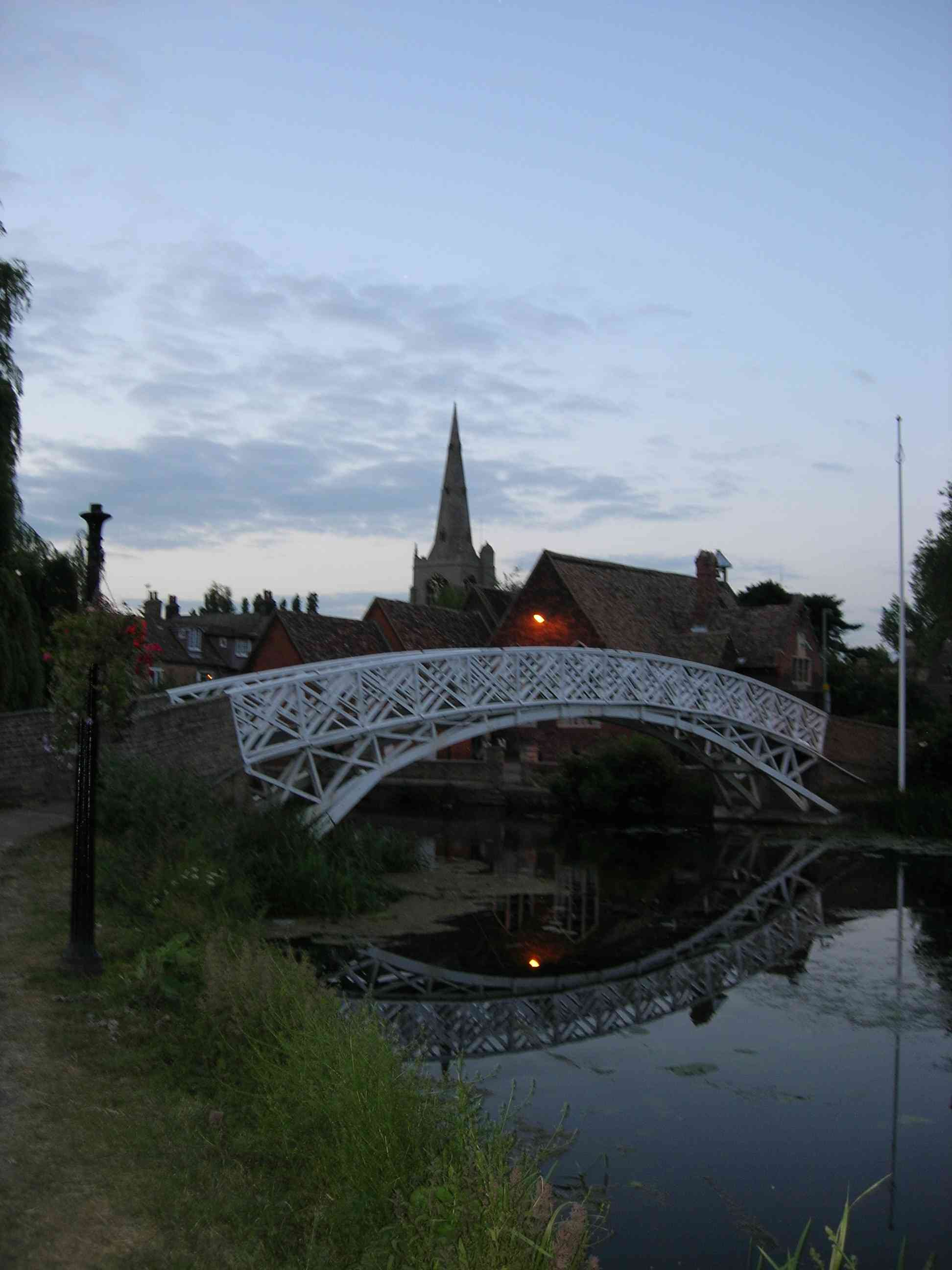
The Chinese Bridge

One of the town's largest public works of art and of landscaping is its Chinese Bridge, which connects to a water meadow. Local legend has it that the bridge was built without the use of nails or other fixings. The bridge was removed by crane on 9 February 2010. A new replica was built off-site in two parts and was installed on 15–16 February 2010. Today the Chinese Bridge does feature nails. The claims are believed to be false; a bridge in Queens' College, Cambridge, had the same urban myth. Expert commentators write that the original nails had corroded away, masking their presence.

== Twin towns – sister cities ==
Godmanchester is twinned with:

- Wertheim am Main, Germany
- Salon-de-Provence, France
- Szentendre, Hungary
- Gubbio, Italy

Facilitated by Huntingdon and Godmanchester Twinning Association

== Sport and leisure ==
The non-League football club Godmanchester Rovers F.C. play at Bearscroft Lane, whose teams play in various regional divisions.

== Transport ==
In 2019 the six-lane A14 was opened, allowing heavy traffic to pass unhindered over the 0.5 miles (0.80 km) long Great Ouse Viaduct, 2.1 miles (3.4 km) south of the town. The arterial road connects the West Midlands to the Haven ports of Ipswich, Harwich and Felixstowe and via the M11 to London. Since opening in 2020 the A1307 has provided a resilient route for light vehicles, north across the river into Huntingdon and south to St Ives and Cambridge. (Historically this route has been repeatedly renamed: most recent first, A1307, A14, A604, A132, Via Devana).

The A1198 road, Ermine Street, links to the A14 or to Royston and for shorter journeys south avoids the A1.

Huntingdon railway station, a semi-major stop on the East Coast Main Line, is less than 1.8 miles (2.9 km) from the town centre by car.

The town of Huntingdon and railway station may also be reached on foot via the expansive meadow or by National Cycle Network route 51.

Local buses from Godmanchester are provided by Whippet (bus company) on routes 66 (to Huntingdon and St Neots) and X2/X3 (to Huntingdon or Papworth and Cambridge).

== Notable people ==
- Stephen Marshall (1594–1655), prominent non-conformist churchman before and during the Interregnum
- Sir Oliver Cromwell (1562–1655), uncle to the Lord Protector and ruler of England, Oliver Cromwell
- Sir William Prescott, 1st Baronet of Godmanchester, (1874–1945), civil engineer and Member of Parliament. Father of Sir Richard Stanley Prescott. On the death of his uncle, Sir Mark Prescott, a race-horse trainer from Newmarket, became 3rd Baronet
- Fred Beart (1850–1895), cricketer, was born in Godmanchester.
- Nigel Bonner (1928–1994), Antarctic marine mammal specialist, retired to Godmanchester and died there.
- Simon Thurley (born 1962), historian and presenter, grew up in Godmanchester.
