= The Dog House (TV series) =

British documentary series on Channel 4

- HBO Max release poster
- Genre: Factual television
- Created by: Five Mile Films
- Narrated by: Perry Fitzpatrick (Season 1), Andrew Buchan (Season 2–)
- Original language: English
- No. of seasons: 9
- No. of episodes: 64 (including Christmas specials)

Production
- Executive producer: Nick Mirsky
- Production locations: Woodgreen Pets Charity, Godmanchester, Cambridgeshire
- Running time: 46–47 minutes
- Production company: Five Mile Films

Original release
- Network: Channel 4
- Release: 5 September 2019 – present

The Dog House is a Channel 4 observational television show, following staff at a pet charity trying to find homes for dogs. Channel 4 describes it as "The dog dating show where people and dogs are matched and - hopefully - fall in love."

== List of episodes ==
Series overview
Series	Episodes	Originally released	
Series	Episodes	First released	Last released
Series 1	8	5 September 2019	24 October 2019
Series 2	9	11 March 2021	6 May 2021
The Dog House at Christmas		16 December 2021	
Series 3	8	6 January 2022	24 February 2022
The Dog House at Christmas		21 December 2022	
Series 4	8	5 January 2023	16 February 2023
The Dog House at Christmas		12 December 2023	
Series 5	7	15 February 2024	4 April 2024
Series 6	5	15 September 2024	13 October 2024
The Dog House at Christmas		18 December 2024	
Series 7	7	30 January 2025	20 March 2025
Series 8	4	28 August 2025	18 September 2025

=== Series 1: 2019 ===
No.	Title	Original release date
1	"Episode 1"	5 September 2019
Terrified Terrier Tiny hopes to find a new home with thirtysomething couple Heather and Elliot after his owner is taken into care, while Mozart finds out if he is the four-legged friend Paul is looking for.
2	"Episode 2"	12 September 2019
A two-year-old Pomeranian arrives at Woodgreen after a life spent in a puppy farm cage.
3	"Episode 3"	19 September 2019
Ten German Shepherd puppies descend on Woodgreen, ready to be socialised.
4	"Episode 4"	26 September 2019
Stray Labrador Leah tries to win over eight-year-old Georgie, and Buddy, an excitable French Bulldog, needs a calming influence.
5	"Episode 5"	3 October 2019
The Woodgreen team search for a companion for 82-year-old Alan. And Terrier puppies Bobo and Lenny, who are completely different in looks and personality, need a forever home.
6	"Episode 6"	10 October 2019
Nervous young Labrador Loki hopes to find a new home with seasoned dog owner Sharron.
7	"Episode 7"	17 October 2019
Wally, a Poodle cross, has spent a year with Woodgreen due to his challenging behaviour. Widow Janet needs company, either with Bichon Frise Bruce.
8	"Episode 8"	24 October 2019
A Lurcher with a broken tail comes in with the stray warden. Small, but confident Collie cross puppy Joey, and springy toy Poodle Gizmo, who has social anxieties, seek homes.

=== Series 2: 2021 ===
No.	Title	Original release date
1	"Episode 1"	11 March 2021
Loved-up Ryan and Katie falls for Kevin the French Bulldog. And an eight-stone Newfoundland attempts to finds a home ready for his size and slobber.
2	"Episode 2"	18 March 2021
Rocco the excitable Jack Russell is looking for love, and Jess finds out if she is a match for Staffordshire Bull Terrier Gloria.
3	"Episode 3"	25 March 2021
Rohan meets Patterdale Terrier puppy Friday, who might be bit too enthusiastic for the nine-year-old. And is Grant the stray Westie's waits for his change of luck.
4	"Episode 4"	1 April 2021
Eleven-year-old Pharaoh is thrilled to meet his dream dog, Gizmo the Pug. And Rocco, the bounciest Jack Russell, finds out if he is the third time lucky.
5	"Episode 5"	8 April 2021
A family get more than they bargained for with not one dog, but two. Louise and Angela find Trinity the Lurcher puppy adorable - but then she starts chewing everything.
6	"Episode 6"	15 April 2021
Dave the three-legged Labrador is looking for a new best friend.
7	"Episode 7"	22 April 2021
A rare cross of Lurcher and Old English Sheepdog helps a priest find his inner silliness.
8	"Episode 8"	29 April 2021
Gold-winning Olympic cyclist Victoria Pendleton visits Wood Green to find a dog she can co-parent with her mum.
9	"Episode 9"	6 May 2021
Zoe, the friendliest but the hungriest Beagle, finds out if she Venessa and her son Jacob falls for her charms. Stanley the Staffie meets dog-mad Linda and Richard.

=== The Dog House at Christmas: 2021 ===
No.	Title	Original release date
1	"The Dog House at Christmas"	16 December 2021
During Christmas, Michael the Lurcher and one-eyed Clarence are looking for a new family.

=== Series 3: 2022 ===
No.	Title	Original release date
1	"Episode 1"	6 January 2022
Rescue dogs seek loving new owners at Wood Green, The Animals Charity, including Olivia the blind Spaniel, Bella the confident, playful Staffie, and a shy, but cuddly pooch called Cech.
2	"Episode 2"	13 January 2022
Can Border Collie Patch, cleverest dog on the block, convinces Megan that he is the smartest choice.
3	"Episode 3"	20 January 2022
Rolo the Staffie tries to woo Nicole. And a Husky tries to outdo two Chihuahuas.
4	"Episode 4"	27 January 2022
Nine-year-old Kiya meets three tiny Cockapoo puppies, overexcited Yorkie Bam Bam meets Londoner Hannah, and Chihuahua Wingnut tries to convince teenager Jacob that Chihuahuas are cool.
5	"Episode 5"	3 February 2022
Two puppies vie for the affections of Sonia and Andy and their two girls. Things are looking up for Lurcher Manuel when he meets Luke and Kath, and Winnie the Lhasa meets potential new bestie Lauren.
6	"Episode 6"	10 February 2022
Harry the Saluki puppy hopes to be the perfect pooch for Charlie and Ali. Nancy the Staffie plays a mean game of fetch, much to the Friend family's delight. Ex-breeding Spaniel Tia seeks a new home to live out her retirement.
7	"Episode 7"	17 February 2022
Bonded pair Poppy and Bron try to find a home that will accept two dogs. Fine artist Ron meets Chip the Terrier cross and Margaux the Mongrel, and Harry the Saluki is still desperately seeking love.
8	"Episode 8"	24 February 2022
Sammy the Retriever needs a new best friend, Margot the Collie needs an owner who will ensure that her active mind stays busy, and Brooke the German Shepherd is still struggling to find a home.

=== The Dog House at Christmas: 2022 ===
No.	Title	Original release date
1	"The Dog House at Christmas"	21 December 2022
At Woodgreen, Ziggy the Fox Terrier and Winston the Staffie cross paths to find a new home in time for Christmas.

=== Series 4: 2023 ===
No.	Title	Original release date
1	"Episode 1"	5 January 2023
Have deaf parents Hannah and Craig and their mischievous boys met their match in Percy the cockapoo puppy?
2	"Episode 2"	5 January 2023
Looking for a new home and a fresh start are Millie and Max, a couple of 'jugs'. There's also a little pooch called Rex, Albie, the Jack Russell puppy, and escape artist Lily the beagle.
3	"Episode 3"	12 January 2023
Lockdown pup Harry is afraid of the world but is making a comeback for a family in need of love. And Lily the beagle has a choice: do a runner or stay put for a cuddle with ex-copper Stuart.
4	"Episode 4"	19 January 2023
An American bulldog called Buddy the Clown throws his weight around with brave couple Katie and James. Terrier Tiddles enjoys a makeover. And does Jacks the Jack Russell have small dog syndrome?
5	"Episode 5"	26 January 2023
Albie the Jack Russell puppy has a second chance of a home with 10-year-old George. And a mistreated lurcher called Sam is in need of some home comforts. Will visitors see past his size?
6	"Episode 6"	2 February 2023
Regal bassett hound Duchess is back on a charm offensive. Loveable goofball Peaches sends Jane and Alan into a spin. And old timer Hettie proves to a family that she's really young at heart.
7	"Episode 7"	9 February 2023
Hurricane the husky meets Peaches the excitable lurcher. And Rosie the live wire Jack Russell chases butterflies, cats... and now also 10-year-old Mitchell. Is her need for speed a bit too much?
8	"Episode 8"	16 February 2023
A rampant French bulldog gets 'attached' to drag queen John. Peaches the lurcher has not one but two dates. But will the unluckiest dog on the books ever find a home?

=== The Dog House at Christmas: 2023 ===
No.	Title	Original release date
1	"The Dog House at Christmas"	12 December 2023
At Woodgreen during Christmas, Jeff, a spaniel-cross puppy, and Crackers, the Patterdale-cross, search for a loving home.

=== Series 5: 2024 ===
No.	Title	Original release date
1	"Episode 1"	15 February 2024
The unstoppable Tilburn girls and their dad James meet Papaya. Yvonne and Graham think their Dachshund Baxter needs a buddy and have their eyes on fellow sausage Tinkerbell. And Tom and Adele want a dog to get them out walking after a health scare.
2	"Episode 2"	15 February 2024
Blind cockapoo Marnie needs a guide dog and Harry wants a new friend to play fetch with.
3	"Episode 3"	22 February 2024
Two teen brothers need a peacekeeper. Is Maggie, a cute Chihuahua cross, right for the job? And Nicola and Matt want very different dogs - can Woodgreen find them a compromise pooch?
4	"Episode 4"	29 February 2024
India needs a special pup to support her with her Tourette's. Paul's mourning for his last pooch and could use a new dog in his life. In walks Ziggy the fox terrier cross.
5	"Episode 5"	14 March 2024
Can a leggy lurcher help two sisters extend their family? An abandoned Staffie cross needs a boost. And a retired flight attendant prepares for take-off with a very exuberant cockapoo.
6	"Episode 6"	21 March 2024
A bearded collie called Rexy Cutie Pie meets 10-year-old Kristopher and family. And can furry siblings Benji and Phoebe convince a retired nurse that two dogs is better than one?
7	"Episode 7"	28 March 2024
An 11-year-old terrier cross arrives at Woodgreen shellshocked from the loss of her lifelong companion. And Tasmin from London is about to go on a whirlwind romance.

=== Series 6: 2024 ===
No.	Title	Original release date
1	"Episode 1"	15 September 2024
It's a clash of the titans when nine-year-old Helena meets Zeus the Shih Tzu. And will jittery retriever Pipet panic when she meets Tom and Ayisha?
2	"Episode 2"	22 September 2024
Rocky the bulldog has had a much-needed facelift for his date, but only has eyes for a toy avocado. Muddy puddle enthusiast Grady the lurcher is looking for a new thrill.
3	"Episode 3"	29 September 2024
White husky Olaf wows brothers Ben and Harry. High-energy spaniel Storm needs a playmate who can keep up with him. Could Macie be the answer?
4	"Episode 4"	6 October 2024
Beth and Jemima want an outgoing pup to fit their friendship group. Tina needs a bold companion. And Max is in mourning and off his game - could a new best friend help?
5	"Episode 5"	13 October 2024
Tom sees dog ownership as a high-risk activity. Can girlfriend Maxine and Monty the Labrador persuade him to throw caution to the wind? And Leila and Alison meet loveable Eloise.

=== The Dog House at Christmas: 2024 ===
No.	Title	Original release date
1	"The Dog House at Christmas"	18 December 2024
A flurry of festive matchmaking at Woodgreen Pets Charity. The team make their abandoned dogs feel extra special at this time of year, but can they find them homes in time for Christmas?

=== Series 7: 2025 ===
No.	Title	Original release date
1	"Episode 1"	30 January 2025
It's back to Woodgreen Pets Charity for more tales of rescue dog meets new owner. Can glamorous poodle-cross Lola live up to dog-obsessed five-year-old Violet's very high expectations?
2	"Episode 2"	6 February 2025
A terrified cockapoo is in a bad way and needs TLC and a haircut. And Coco the dachshund has to overcome first date nerves when she meets 25-year-old Liv.
3	"Episode 3"	13 February 2025
Dog behaviour specialist Sue pulls out all the stops to help beloved long-term resident Lady, the Staffie cross, finally find a home, after a year of searching.
4	"Episode 4"	20 February 2025
A family of three dogs are split up to increase their chance of finding a forever home. But nervous Annie sticks close to more confident Ruby; will someone take them on as a pair?
5	"Episode 5"	27 February 2025
Seventeen-year-old farmer Sam seeks a tractor cab companion, preferably one that likes to dance. Can cocker spaniel Araf hit the right note?
6	"Episode 6"	13 March 2025
Breeze the American bulldog cross makes a big impression. Enough for Charlotte?
7	"Episode 7"	20 March 2025
Can Evie the lurcher help Spanish street dog Billy manage his fear of people? And is Bear the right Yorkipoo for new couple Justin and Richard?

=== Series 8: 2025 ===
No.	Title	Original release date
1	"Episode 1"	28 August 2025
2	"Episode 2"	4 September 2025
3	"Episode 3"	11 September 2025
4	"Episode 4"	18 September 2025

== Filming ==
The Dog House is filmed at Woodgreen Pets Charity in Godmanchester, Cambridgeshire.

== Reception ==
The TV show of the decade

— The Times

The Daily Telegraph said The Dog House was "the most charming – and emotional – show on TV" and The Guardian called it "feelgood TV at its fluffiest."

== Release ==
=== International broadcast ===
It was reported in May 2020 that HBO Max had acquired the U.S. streaming rights for the series, then released the first season in June 2020 and the second season in June 2021.

=== International versions ===
The Dog House Australia first broadcast on Network 10 in October 2021 and is narrated by Mark Coles Smith (previously Chris Brown). The show currently has two series with a celebrity special. It is filmed in Kemps Creek at the Animal Welfare League NSW.

The Dog House New Zealand first broadcast on TVNZ in February 2023, and is filmed at the Country Retreat Animal Sanctuary in Warkworth, north of Auckland.
