= 1921 in architecture =

The year 1921 in architecture involved some significant architectural events and new buildings.

== Events ==
- March – Puhl & Wagner are contracted to decorate the interior of the Golden Hall (Stockholm City Hall) with neo-Byzantine mosaics designed by Einar Forseth.
- March 21 – Teatro Yagüez in Puerto Rico, designed by José Sabàs Honoré, reopens.
- May 27 – A Buddha image is enshrined in the main hall of the Daifukuji Soto Zen Mission in Hawai'i, as part of a dedication ceremony for the building.
- September 5 – The Cervantes Theatre in Buenos Aires, Argentina, opens with a production of Lope de Vega's La dama boba.
- Hugo Häring and Ludwig Mies van der Rohe submit a competition entry for a Friedrichstrasse office building, fully made of glass.
- Construction work begins on the Watts Towers in Los Angeles, designed by Simon Rodia.

== Buildings and structures ==
=== Buildings opened ===
- January 23 – Ohel Rachel Synagogue in Shanghai, China, designed by Robert Bradshaw Moorhead and Sidney Joseph Halse, is dedicated.
- March 3 – New terminal at the Central railway station, Sydney, Australia, complete with clock tower.
- May 2 – Cunard Building (New York City), designed by Benjamin Wistar Morris with consultants Carrère and Hastings.
- October 26 – The Chicago Theatre movie palace in the United States.
- October 28 – The Theater Pathé Tuschinski movie/live theatre in Amsterdam, designed by Hijman Louis de Jong.

=== Buildings completed ===
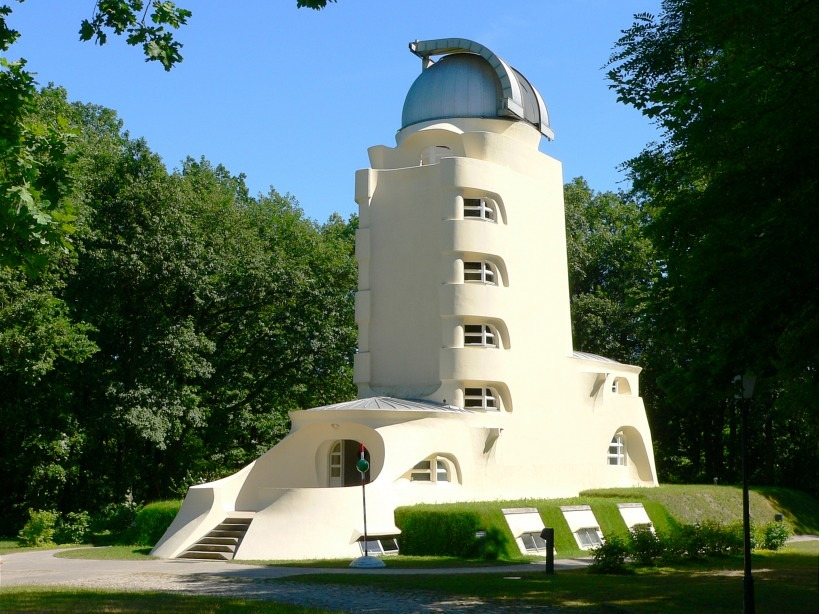
Einstein Tower

- The Einstein Tower near Potsdam, Germany, designed by Erich Mendelsohn.
- Berliner Tageblatt, designed by Erich Mendelsohn.
- Harkness Tower in Yale University in New Haven, Connecticut, United States, after 4 years of construction.
- The Corn Palace in Mitchell, South Dakota, United States is completed (except for domes added in 1937).
- The Wong Tai Sin Temple (Hong Kong) is moved to its current site and completed.
- New Hindu Durgiana Temple in Amritsar.
- Michel de Klerk's Het Schip housing development for Eigen Haard in Amsterdam.
- Monument to the March Dead (Denkmal der Märzgefallenen), by Walter Gropius in Weimar, Germany.
- The Mayslake Peabody Estate in Oak Brook, Illinois, United States.
- Wolseley House (showroom and offices), 160 Piccadilly, London, designed by William Curtis Green.

== Designs ==
- Adolf Loos designs a mausoleum for Max Dvořák that is never built.

== Awards ==
- American Academy of Arts and Letters Gold Medal – Cass Gilbert.
- RIBA Royal Gold Medal – Edwin Lutyens.

== Births ==
- January 15 – Ulrich Franzen, German-born American "Brutalist" architect, in Düsseldorf (died 2012)
- February 26 – Angelo Mangiarotti, Italian architect and industrial designer, in Milan (died 2012)
- March 14 – Ada Louise Huxtable, New York architecture critic and writer (died 2013)
- July 22 – Colin Madigan, Australian architect (died 2011)
- September 6 – Lyubow Demeetriyevna Oosava, Russian-born Belarusian architect (died 2015)

== Deaths ==
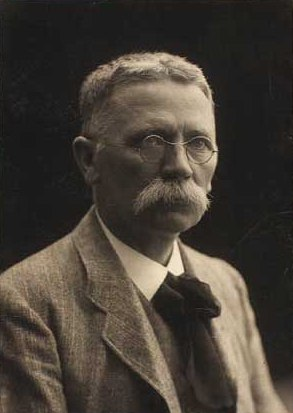
Martin Nyrop

- March 3 – Pierre Cuypers, Dutch church and museum architect (born 1827)
- May 18 – Martin Nyrop, Danish architect of Copenhagen City Hall (born 1849)
- June 1 – Sir Robert Rowand Anderson, Scottish Victorian architect (born 1834)
- December 10 – George Ashlin, Irish ecclesiastical architect (born 1837)
