= Woodgreen Pets Charity =

British charitable organization

- Helping pets and their people
- Formation: 1924; 102 years ago
- Founder: Louisa Snow
- Founded at: Lordship Lane, Wood Green
- Type: Charity
- Registration no.: 298348
- Legal status: Charity
- Location: London
- Chief Executive: Rohan Putter
- Chair of Trustees: Ms Lynn Michael
- Staff: 305 (2020)
- Volunteers: 471 (2020)
- Website: woodgreen.org.uk
- Formerly called: "Wood Green, The Animals Charity", "Wood Green Animal Shelters"

Woodgreen Pets Charity was founded in 1924 by Miss Louisa Snow. She had been concerned at the large number of abandoned and injured animals on the streets of London following the First World War. This led to her opening a centre in a house in Lordship Lane, North London.

In 1987 the charity opened its centre in Godmanchester, Cambridge. The original Lordship Lane building closed down on March of 2020.

== General ==
=== Services ===
In 2020, the charity launched a Pet Collection service which covers North London, Cambridgeshire and Hertfordshire. The service was introduced for owners who need to give up their pets, as well as stray animal intakes.

=== Rebrand ===
2 years after the announcement of their new strategy in 2020, the charity rebranded as Woodgreen Pets Charity. The decision to merge their title into one word was a way for the charity to acknowledge its origins whilst allowing them to appeal to more people across the UK.

The 2022 rebrand saw both a new logo and strapline, "helping pets and their people".

== King's Bush Farm ==
After its opening in 1987, the Godmanchester location has since become one of the largest animal rehoming centres in Europe, with modern facilities for the care of dogs, cats, small and outdoor animals.

A veterinary surgery and kennels block were built at the charity's Godmanchester centre in 2012. This was largely funded by a gift from a dedicated supporter left in their Will.

== The Dog House ==
In 2019, the charity was the focus of a Channel Four series, The Dog House. Approximately a million people tuned in to each episode. Series two started on 11 March 2021 and all episodes were made available on All 4.

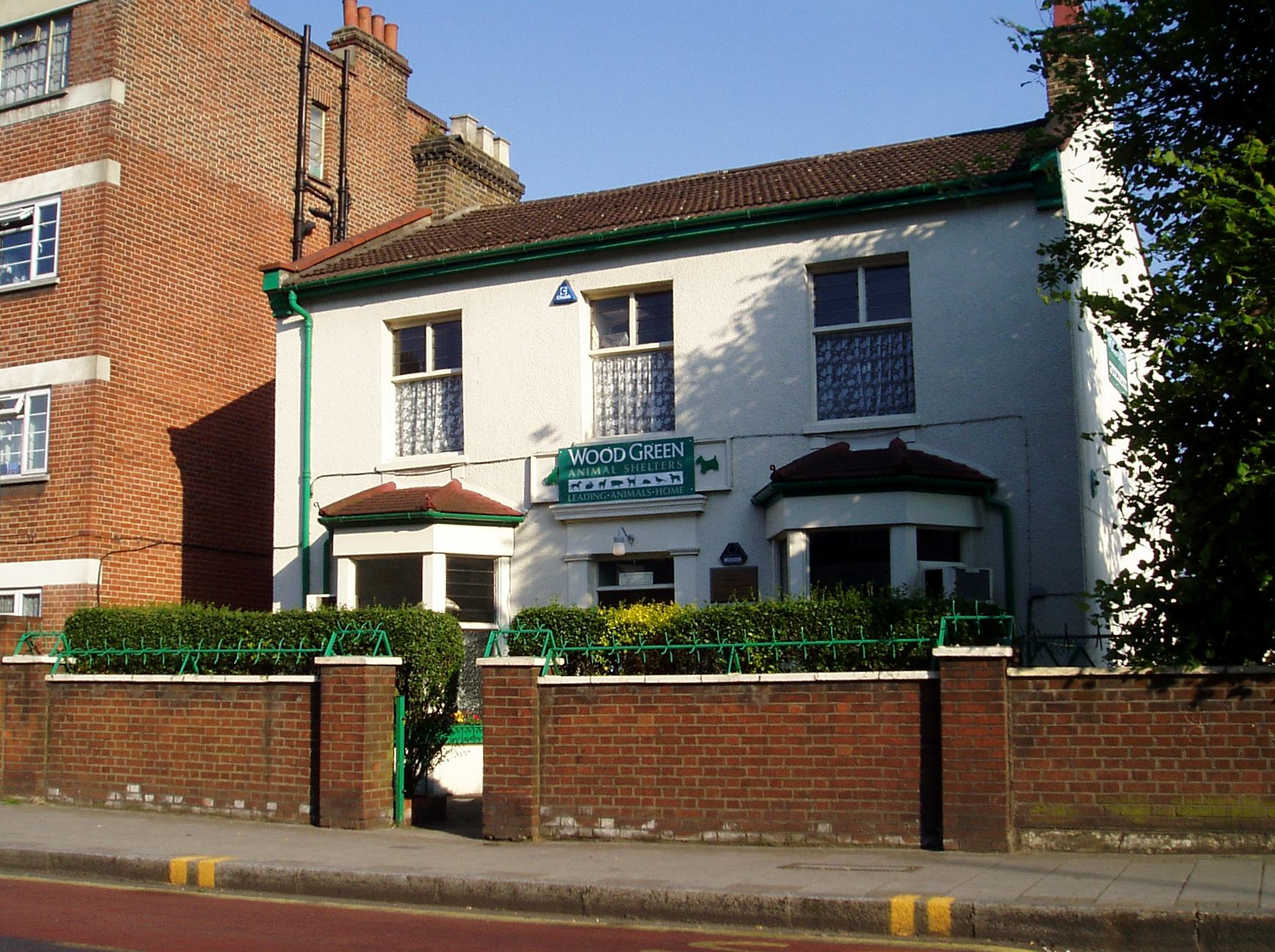
The original animal shelter in Lordship Lane, Wood Green

The old logo featured on a sign

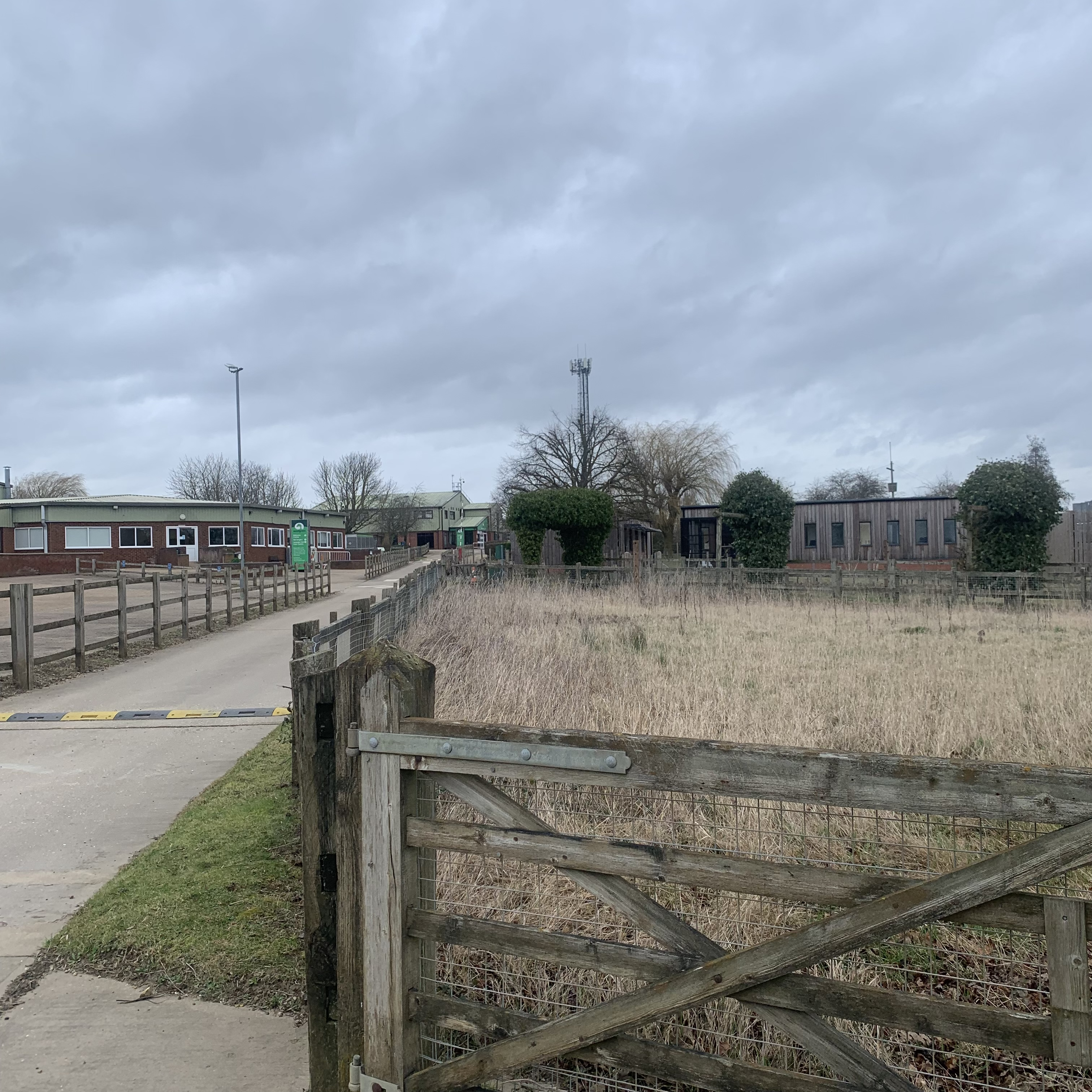
Entrance road leading to the Kings Bush Farm site

== Partnerships ==
=== Bobs from Skechers ===
Woodgreen became the first animal charity in the UK to get involved in the Skechers initiative.

=== Wild ===
In September 2023, the charity announced a partnership with the sustainable deodorant brand Wild. The company launched a limited edition case, featuring illustrations of sausage dogs.
