= Brampton Wood =

Nature reserve in Cambridgeshire, England

Coordinates: 52.316°N 0.27°W

- Site of Special Scientific Interest
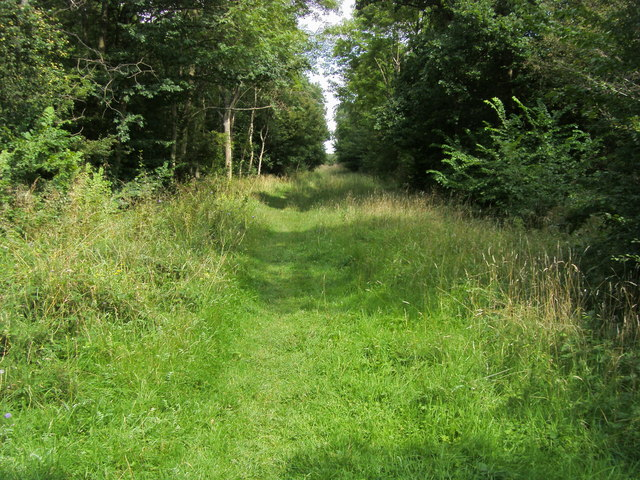
- Location of Brampton Wood.
- Area of search: Cambridgeshire
- Grid reference: TL 179 701
- Interest: Biological
- Area: 132.1 hectares
- Notification date: 1983
- Location map: Magic Map

Brampton Wood is a 132.1-hectare (326-acre) biological Site of Special Scientific Interest in Cambridgeshire. The site is west of Brampton in Cambridgeshire. It is managed by the Wildlife Trust for Bedfordshire, Cambridgeshire and Northamptonshire.

== Management ==
Brampton Wood has experienced a period of plantation forestry. Scots pine, Corsican pine and Norway spruce dominate about one fifth of the woodland. These plantations were introduced in the 1950s by the Forestry Commission, shortly after they took over the management of the wood on behalf of the Ministry of Defence. The plantations were planted in rows for ease of exploitation. When the MoD sold the wood in 1992 a public appeal enabled the Wildlife Trust to buy it, since then the woods and rides have been managed for wildlife conservation.

Coppicing is used to encourage growth and indefinite succession young stems. This provides ideal conditions for many woodland flowers as well as birds and invertebrates. The many muntjac deer in Brampton Wood can graze the young shoots and prevent regeneration unless controls are put in place. The exceeded carrying capacity of deer means security fencing surrounding the coppiced trees must be installed to ensure that the new growth is not eaten. Coppiced stumps may be covered in brushwood to deter deer from eating new growth. The medieval practice of pollarding could be introduced.

== Wildlife ==
=== Flora ===
Approximately 280 species of fern, conifer, flowering plant and tree have been recorded in Brampton Wood. These include species such as dog's mercury, bluebell, primrose and violets. Also notable to the woodland are the ‘major oaks’ which stand at the entrance to the main ride.

Brampton Wood hosts three examples of wild service tree. The berries of this tree — known as 'chequers' were once widely used to flavour beer in Great Britain (before hops). A limited edition beer 'Chequered Past' was produced by The Son of Sid Brewery in 2010.

=== Fauna ===
Brampton Wood has thriving colonies of black hairstreaks, one of Britain’s rarest butterflies. The butterfly survives due to careful management of the rides. This involves trimming the scrub at times in the year when the population can cope. Brown argus, white admiral and purple hairstreak can also be spotted at Brampton Wood.

Also currently thriving in Brampton Wood is the hazel dormouse population. The species was reintroduced in 1992 and live in low densities across the wood. They thrive on hazel, bramble and a variety of flowers.
