= Fred Beart =

English cricketer and British Army officer

Personal information
- Full name: Frederick Robert Beart
- Born: 6 July 1850; Godmanchester, Huntingdonshire, England
- Died: 4 March 1895 (aged 44); Godmanchester, Huntingdonshire, England
- Relatives: Charles Beart (son)

Domestic team information
- Years: Team
- 1871: Oxford University

Career statistics
Competition	First-class
Matches	1
Runs scored	0
Batting average	0.00
100s/50s	–/–
Top score	0
Catches/stumpings	1/–
- Source: Cricinfo, 5 January 2020

Frederick Robert Beart (6 July 1850 – 4 March 1895) was an English first-class cricketer and British Army officer.

The son of Robert Beart, a brick and tile manufacturer, he was born at Godmanchester in July 1850. He was educated at Marlborough College, before going up to Wadham College, Oxford. While studying at Oxford, Beart made a single appearance in first-class cricket for Oxford University against the Marylebone Cricket Club at Oxford in 1871. Batting once in the match, he was dismissed without scoring in the Oxford first-innings by Frank Farrands. After graduating from Oxford, he was commissioned as a lieutenant in the Huntingdon Militia. He was promoted to captain in March 1880 and the following year in July he was appointed as a justice of the peace for Huntingdonshire. By 1886, Beart was serving with the King's Royal Rifle Corps and in April of that year he was promoted to major. He died at Godmanchester in March 1895. His son, Charles, also played first-class cricket.
