= 1906 in architecture =

The year 1906 in architecture involved some significant architectural events and new buildings.

== Events ==
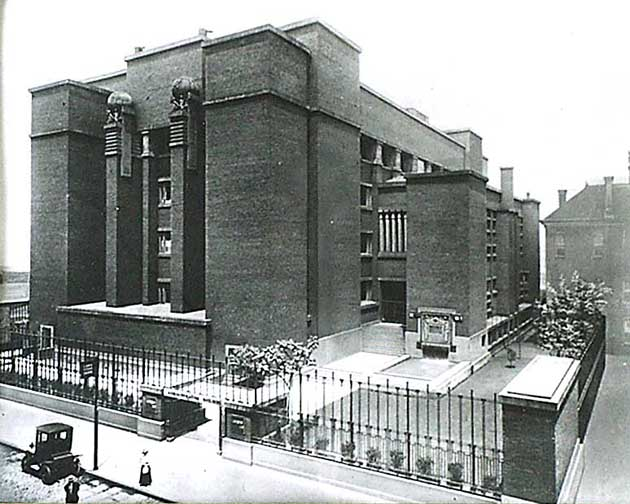
Larkin Administration Building when new

- April 18 – 1906 San Francisco earthquake destroys 80% of the city.
- Construction begins on
  - New Great Mosque of Djenné in French Sudan.
  - Church of St Mary the Virgin, Wellingborough, England, designed by Ninian Comper.
  - Benito Juárez Hemicycle in Mexico City, Mexico.
  - Waiting room at Pennsylvania Station (New York City), designed by McKim, Mead, and White.
  - Palace of Administration, Iași, Moldavia, designed by I. D. Berindei.
- Hampstead Garden Suburb established in north London with Raymond Unwin as architect.

== Buildings and structures ==
=== Buildings opened ===
- January 1 – Mateer Memorial Church, Trivandrum, India.
- May 12 – Palace of the Argentine National Congress, Buenos Aires, designed by Vittorio Meano and completed by Julio Dormal.

=== Buildings completed ===
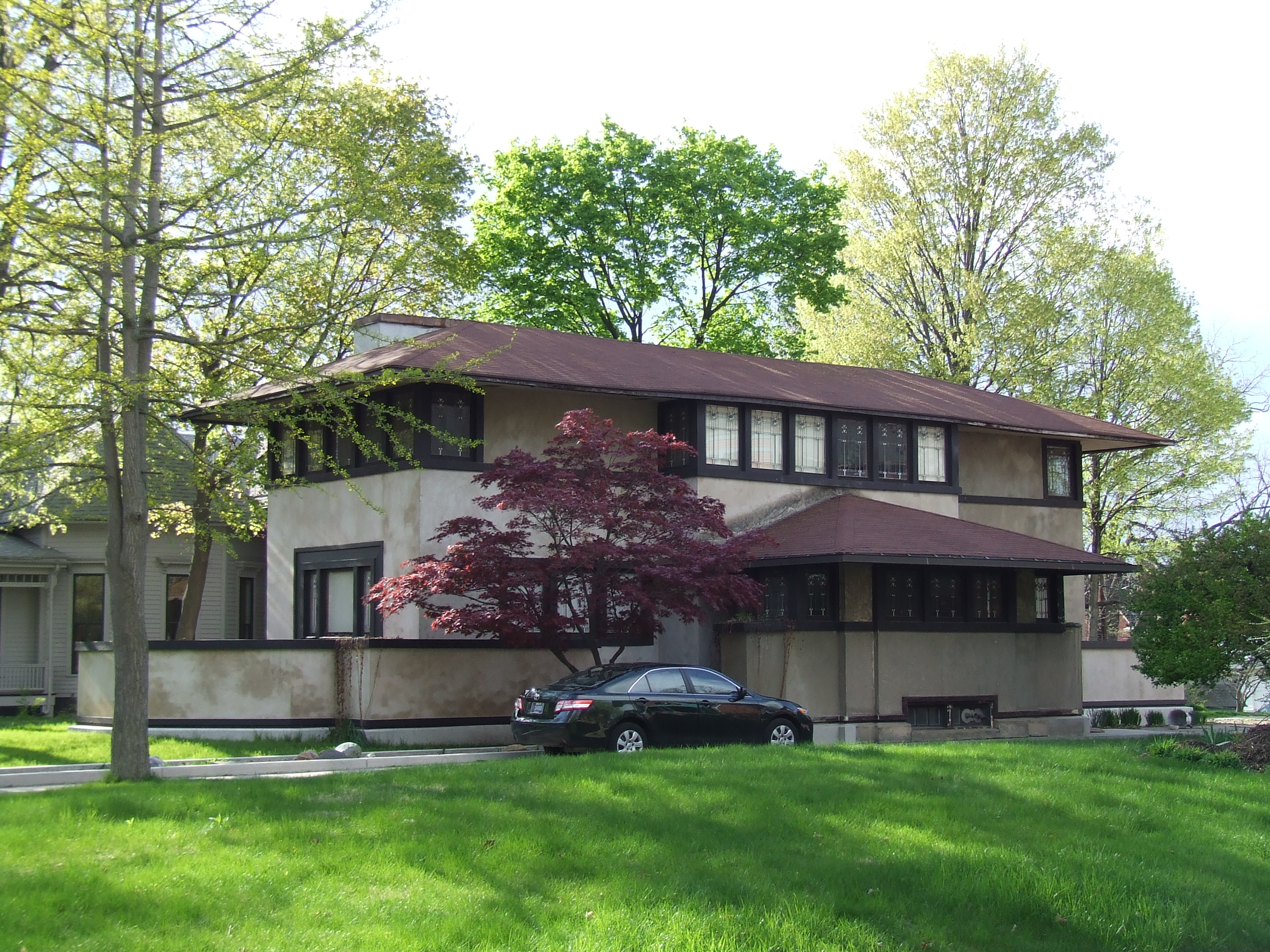
K. C. DeRhodes House

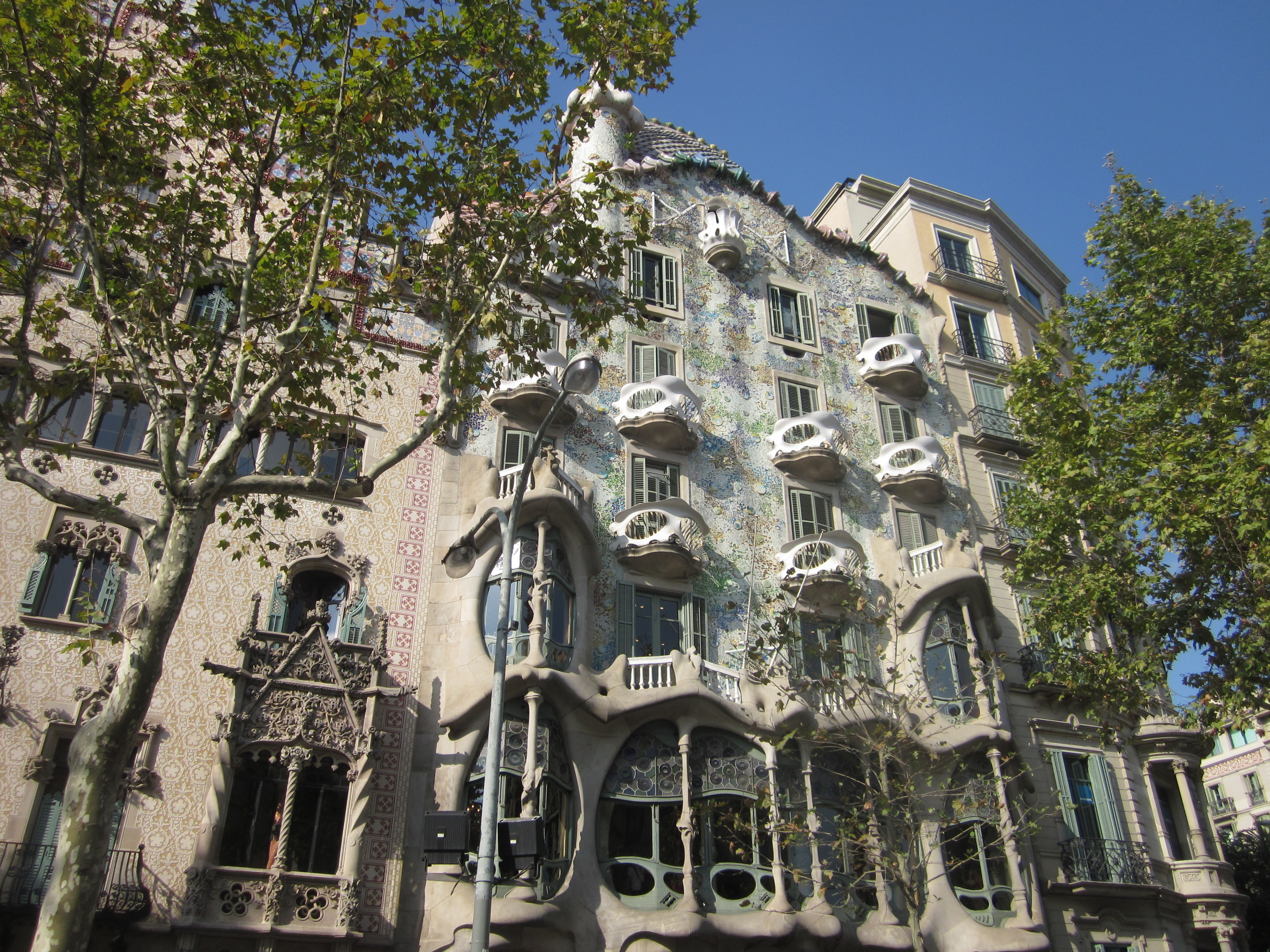
Casa Batlló in Barcelona, Spain

- Larkin Administration Building for the Larkin Soap Company, Buffalo, New York, and Unity Temple in Oak Park, Illinois, designed by Frank Lloyd Wright.
- Ferry Engineering Works, Queensferry, Wales, designed by Harry Bulkeley Creswell and Hugh P. G. Maule.
- Dunedin railway station in New Zealand, designed by George Troup.
- North Eastern Railway headquarters offices in York and London, designed by Horace Field.
- Gresham Palace (insurance headquarters offices), Budapest, designed by Zsigmond Quittner with József and László Vágó.
- K. C. DeRhodes House, South Bend, Indiana, designed by Frank Lloyd Wright.
- Casa Batlló in Barcelona, designed by Antoni Gaudí.
- Palau del Baró de Quadras in Barcelona, designed by Josep Puig i Cadafalch.
- Weissenburger House, designed by Lucien Weissenburger for himself at 1, boulevard Charles V in Nancy, France.
- Stollwerckhaus, Cologne, designed by Carl Moritz.
- National Theatre, Sofia, Bulgaria, designed by Fellner & Helmer.
- City Hall, Cardiff, Wales, designed by Lanchester, Stewart and Rickards.
- Rotunda of National Library of Finland in Helsinki, designed by Gustaf Nyström.
- Sofia Church in Stockholm, designed by Gustaf Hermansson.

== Awards ==
- RIBA Royal Gold Medal – Lawrence Alma-Tadema.
- Grand Prix de Rome, architecture: Patrice Bonnet.

== Publications ==
- John Galsworthy's novel The Man of Property, first of The Forsyte Saga, with the background of the building of an English country house for Soames Forsyte by young architect Philip Bosinney.

== Births ==
- May 30 – Maxwell M. Kalman, Québécois architect (died 2009)
- June 2 – Carlo Scarpa, Italian architect (died 1978)
- July 8 – Philip Johnson, American architect (died 2005)
- August 28 – John Betjeman, English poet and architectural writer (died 1984)
- December 30 – Alziro Bergonzo, Italian architect and painter (died 1997)

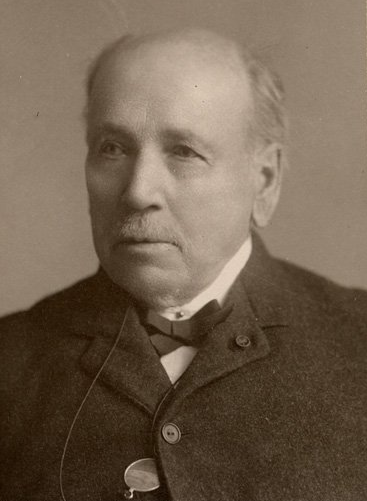
Charles Baillairgé

== Deaths ==
- February 1 – J. P. Seddon, English architect and designer (born 1827)
- May 10 – Charles Baillairgé, French-Canadian architect, land surveyor, civil engineer and author (born 1826)
- June 25 – Stanford White, American architect, partner in McKim, Mead & White (born 1853)
- September 13 – Christian Christie, Norwegian architect (born 1832)
- Charles Worley, English architect
