= Pathfinder March =

Route Marker

The Pathfinder March is an annual 46-mile (74-kilometre) long-distance walk around the County of Cambridgeshire, England. The most common route is now recognised as Pathfinder Way Long-distance walk. The March, which currently draws about two hundred and fifty to three hundred participants, is held to perpetuate the memory of the famous Royal Air Force Pathfinder Force (8 Group) from the Second World War. Recent years have seen it become an international event with members of the US Air Force and Army, Canadian Air Forces (members of 405 Sqn - one of the only two remaining operational Pathfinder Force Squadrons) and the Danish, French and German Armed forces, although it was not possible in 2020 or 2021.

The event starts and finishes at Royal Air Force Wyton, and is scheduled for the closest Saturday to the Mid-Summers Day. Due to the strenuous nature of this event, and the weather conditions a number of participants do not complete the course, although the percentage of finishers is increasing. There have also been more and more runners taking part

The route has been modified since the Pathfinder March was first introduced in 1997, and no longer crosses the airfield as it is active during the event. Instead, the route now tracks from Warboys west to the village of Kings Ripton, before heading south and the RAF station. The route is signposted with way marker signs displaying the silhouette of a mosquito aircraft and is open all year as the Pathfinder Long Distance Walk.

== The route ==
Entrants have 20 hours to complete the full 46 mile course. Walkers set off at 0400 hrs, whilst those wishing to run the distance start at 0800 hrs to allow time for the check points to be put in place at later stages of the route. All participants are encouraged to keep to the times set for the various stages of the course, otherwise they will not complete the course and be forced to retire. The route encompasses RAF Wyton, Godmanchester, Graveley Airfield, Graveley, Papworth Everard, Elsworth, Childerley, Dry Drayton, Oakington, Oakington Airfield, Longstanton, Bluntisham, Colne, Somersham, Warboys, Warboys Airfield, Kings Ripton before finishing back at RAF Wyton. There are 8 Check Points for participants to report to and have their walkers/runners cards punched.

A small section of the Ouse Valley Way is used on the Pathfinder March.
