= Brampton Grange =

House in Brampton, Cambridgeshire, England

Coordinates: 52.3241°N 0.2285°W

Brampton Grange in Brampton, Cambridgeshire, England, is a historic building that dates to 1773. Used as a school in the 19th century, the building was later vital to the planning and execution of a bombing campaign against Germany during the Second World War: the United States Army Air Forces (USAAF) 1st Bombardment Division, part of the Eighth Air Force, was based here from 1943 to 1945.

After the war, Brampton Grange was later adapted for use as a hotel, bar and restaurant. It closed in 2007–2008. Several years later it was redeveloped for luxury residences. In November 2015 work was completed on 11 apartments and associated amenities in the building.

== Brampton's First Girls School ==
Until the removal of the eastern wing by developers, marks could be seen on the walls from school girls carvings from their pencils.

Ridley Haim Herschell was asked by Lady Olivia Sparrow to manage her schools in Leigh-on-Sea, Essex and Brampton, Cambridgeshire. The school was at the Grange. Herschell had married Helen Skirving, daughter of William Mowbray of Edinburgh. Their eldest son, Farrer (1837–1899), was born at Brampton on 2 November 1837.

The senior Herschell later became well known in the religious community. He was the founder of the British Society for Propagating the Gospel Among the Jews (1842) and of the Evangelical Alliance (1845).

Farrer Herschell became a barrister and senior government official. Designated as 1st Baron Herschell, he was appointed as Lord High Chancellor of Great Britain in 1886. He served again from 1892 to 1895

== USAAF use ==
RAF Brampton Grange – Station 103 – Brampton, 1st Air Division.

Brampton Grange was the headquarters of the 8th Air Force 1st Bombardment Wing. (It was renamed as the 1st Bombardment Division on 13 September 1943, to end confusion of the term "wing" with the operational combat wings. In December 1944, it was renamed as the 1st Air Division.) It was termed RAF Brampton Grange in official records.

The 1st BW/BD/AD directed combat operations of Boeing B-17 Flying Fortress bomber and fighter groups under its command from August 1942 to 25 April 1945. It was an administrative headquarters which relied on RAF Alconbury for logistical support and its flying requirements.

Bomb Groups assigned to the 1st Air Division conducted mercy missions in 1945 over the German-occupied part of the Netherlands to drop food to starving Dutch. Operation Chowhound delivered 4,000 tons of food. On the ground, Dutch teams gathered to distribute it to the starving population, though due to travel difficulties this sometimes took up to ten days.

The Germans largely withheld their fire. But both operations sustained some losses: Three US aircraft were lost, two to a collision and a third to an engine fire.

=== Congressional visit ===
Congressmen Senators Ralph O. Brewster, Henry Cabot Lodge Jr., Richard Russell, James Mead, and Albert (Happy) Chandler visited the Grange in 1943.

=== Freedom Of The Borough Of Bedford ===
On 19 July 1945 Major General Howard M. Turner, Commanding General of the 1st Air Division, was presented The Freedom Of The Borough Of Bedford.

== Post USAAF use ==
In the spring of 1945 it was taken over by the RAF as the Headquarters of the Technical Training Command. The Grange Hotel opened in 1980.
