= Godmanchester Eastside Common =

Site of Special Scientific Interest in England

Coordinates: 52.325°N 0.139°W

- Site of Special Scientific Interest
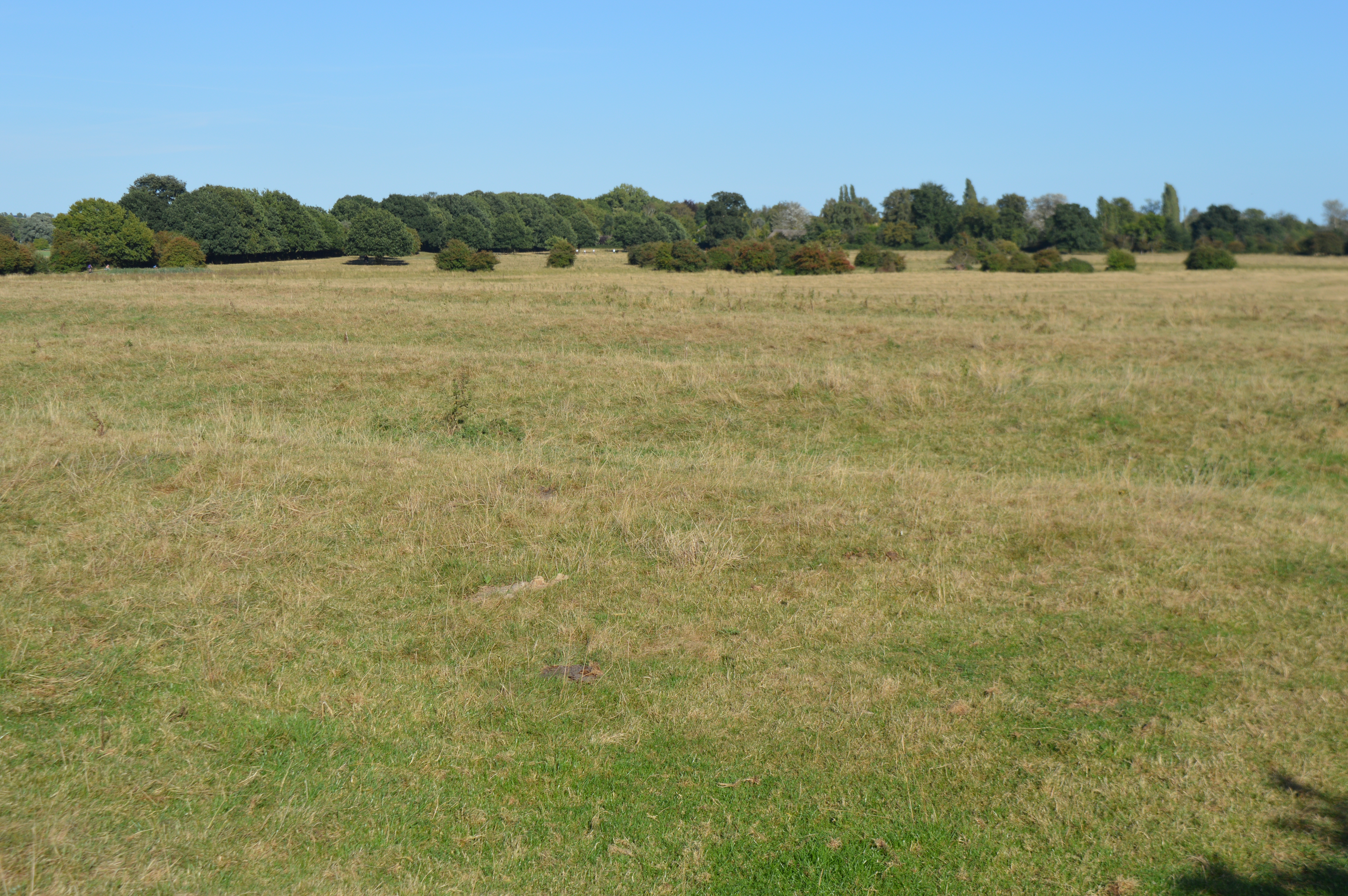
- Medieval ridge and furrow on Godmanchester Eastside Common
- Location of Godmanchester Eastside Common.
- Area of search: Cambridgeshire
- Grid reference: TL 269 713
- Interest: Biological
- Area: 29.7 hectares
- Notification date: 1986
- Location map: Magic Map

Godmanchester Eastside Common is a 29.7-hectare (73-acre) biological Site of Special Scientific Interest east of Godmanchester in Cambridgeshire. The site is registered common land.

There are two fields, with a disused railway line separating them. The habitats are calcareous loam and calcareous clay, both of which are unusual, and there are diverse grass species, such as crested hair-grass and meadow oat grass. The southern field has lines of medieval ridge and furrow.

There is access from Common Lane.
