= Brampton, Cambridgeshire =

Suburban village in Cambridgeshire, England

Coordinates: 52°19′23″N 0°13′38″W

Brampton
- Village
- Location within Cambridgeshire
- Population: 6,900 (2021)
- OS grid reference: TL205705
  - London: 54 miles (87 km)
- Civil parish: Brampton
- District: Huntingdonshire
- Shire county: Cambridgeshire
- Region: East
- Country: England
- Sovereign state: United Kingdom
- Post town: HUNTINGDON
- Postcode district: PE28
- Dialling code: 01480
- Police: Cambridgeshire
- Fire: Cambridgeshire
- Ambulance: East of England
- UK Parliament: Huntingdon

Brampton is a village and civil parish in Cambridgeshire, England. It lies about 2 miles (3 km) south-west of Huntingdon within Huntingdonshire, a non-metropolitan district of Cambridgeshire and a historic county of England. According to the 2011 UK census, Brampton had a population of 4,862 (slightly down on the 2001 UK census figure of 5,030) A 2019 estimate puts it at 5,462.

== History ==
Historically Brampton was variously known as Brantune (11th century), Brantone or Bramptone (12th–13th centuries) and Brauntone or Brampton (13th century). Scattered human remains dating back 1600–2000 years have been found in one or more gardens of houses near the primary school. The origin of these has yet to identified.

In the Domesday Book survey of 1086 Brampton was listed as Brantune in the Hundred of Leightonstone in Huntingdonshire. It had two manors, yielding aggregate rents to their lords of the manors in 1066 of £20, which had increased to £21.5 by 1086. Domesday recorded a total of 42 households, which suggests a population of 125–200. The area expressed in hides (variously defined as the area a team of eight oxen could plough in a season) – 120 acres (49 hectares), thought to support a household – or as the area that could be assessed as £1 for tax purposes. Brampton was put down for 18 ploughlands in 1086, plus 100 acres (40 hectares) of meadows, 194 acres (79 hectares) of woodland and two water mills. The tax assessment was expressed in geld or danegeld and by 1130 it was being collected annually at rates varying between two and six shillings in the pound. For the Brampton manors the tax liability was 16.3 geld in 1068.

The church and its priest antedate Domesday. The Church of St Mary Magdalene (earlier St Mary the Virgin) consists of a chancel with a north vestry, nave, north aisle, south aisle, west tower and north and south porches. Its existence is mentioned in Domesday but very few features today date from before the 14th century.

Brampton has associations with the diarist Samuel Pepys. Legend has it that his fortune is buried somewhere in the village: during the panic caused by the Dutch raid on the Medway in 1667 he buried his gold in the garden of Brampton House and was never sure how much of it he had succeeded in recovering. Brampton was the home of his uncle, Robert Pepys, elder brother of the diarist's father, whose house still stands. Samuel Pepys is known to have stayed there and at the Black Bull Inn in the village. After Robert's death in 1661 a bitter legal dispute arose over the Brampton inheritance, involving Samuel, his father and several other claimants. It was ultimately settled out of court.

Brampton Inclosure Act 1772
- Act of Parliament
- Parliament of Great Britain
- Long title: An Act for dividing, allotting, and enclosing, the Open and Common fields, Meadows, Commonable Lands, and Commons, within the Manor, Parish, and Liberties, of Brampton, in the County of Huntingdon.
- Citation: 12 Geo. 3. c. 67 Pr.
- Territorial extent: Great Britain

Dates
- Royal assent: 16 April 1772
- Commencement: 21 January 1772 (Note: Start of session.)

Status: Current legislation

There was an enclosure award on the parish by the Brampton Inclosure Act 1772 (12 Geo. 3. c. 67 Pr.).

During World War II Brampton hosted the 1st Bombardment Wing of the US Army Air Corps at RAF Brampton Grange, on the High Street. Almost all the bomber and fighter groups and squadrons in Cambridgeshire were commanded by the 1st Bombardment Wing in Brampton, renamed the First Bomber Division and finally renamed in 1944 the First Air Division. At the end of the war the headquarters and staff were moved on 25 April 1945 from The Grange in Brampton to RAF Alconbury, a few miles away, where the US Air Force still operates a wing commanding several bases and facilities.

== Government ==
Brampton has an elected parish council of 15 members meeting on the third Wednesday of the month. Its second local-government tier is Huntingdonshire District Council based in Huntingdon. Brampton as a district ward has two councillors.

Brampton's highest tier of local government is Cambridgeshire County Council based in Cambridge. (It belonged to the historic and administrative county of Huntingdonshire until 1965, then to the new administrative county of Huntingdon and Peterborough, and since 1974 to the county of Cambridgeshire.) Brampton has one county councillor in the electoral division of Brampton and Kimbolton.

At Westminster, Brampton is in the parliamentary constituency of Huntingdon, represented in the House of Commons by Ben Obese Jecty (Conservative) since 2024. A previous member was John Major (Conservative, 1983–2001).

== Geography ==
At one time the higher part of Brampton parish was forested as Brampton Wood, but it now has less than 300 acres (1.2 km^{2}) of woodland. It is generally low-lying, about 33 feet (10 m) above sea level, but it rises to 164 feet (50 m) towards the south-west boundary.

Most of Portholme, the UK's largest meadow falls within the parish of Brampton.

== Climate ==
Brampton, like most of the United Kingdom, has a temperate and oceanic, or Cfb under the Köppen climate classification Eastern areas such as East Anglia are drier, cooler and less windy, with greater daily and seasonal temperature variations than the rest of England. Cambridgeshire has cool onshore coastal breezes further to the east, keeping it warm in summer and cold and frosty in winter.

The nearest weather station for long-term data is at RAF Wyton, 3 mi (5 km) north-east of Huntingdon town centre. More recently Monks Wood, 8 mi (13 km) to the north of Brampton, also provides data.

Typically 43.2 nights of the year report an air frost. The absolute minimum at Wyton was −16.1 °C (3.0 °F) in January 1982. The mean for the annual coldest night of the year is −7.7 °C (18.1 °F).

Climate data for Monks Wood, elevation 41m, (1981–2010 averages)
Month	Jan	Feb	Mar	Apr	May	Jun	Jul	Aug	Sep	Oct	Nov	Dec	Year
Mean daily maximum °C (°F)	7.2 (45.0)	7.7 (45.9)	10.7 (51.3)	13.5 (56.3)	16.8 (62.2)	19.7 (67.5)	23.4 (74.1)	23.3 (73.9)	19.2 (66.6)	15.0 (59.0)	10.3 (50.5)	7.4 (45.3)	14.52 (58.14)
Mean daily minimum °C (°F)	1.1 (34.0)	0.8 (33.4)	2.6 (36.7)	3.8 (38.8)	6.6 (43.9)	9.7 (49.5)	12.8 (55.0)	11.7 (53.1)	9.9 (49.8)	7.0 (44.6)	3.9 (39.0)	1.9 (35.4)	6.0 (42.8)
Average rainfall mm (inches)	47.0 (1.85)	35.0 (1.38)	40.1 (1.58)	47.0 (1.85)	47.9 (1.89)	54.1 (2.13)	48.3 (1.90)	51.7 (2.04)	53.3 (2.10)	60.2 (2.37)	54.2 (2.13)	47.1 (1.85)	585.8 (23.06)
Mean monthly sunshine hours	58.0	77.4	109.9	152.3	186.2	193.6	212.3	202.1	176.5	114.6	67.0	52.4	1,601.9
Source: Met Office Monks Wood, Cambridgeshire

With annual rainfall at under 550 millimetres (22 in) a year, the Huntingdon area is among the driest in the UK – 103.4 days on average record at least 1 mm of rain. All averages mentioned refer to the period 1971–2000.

== Demography ==
=== Population ===
The earliest census data, from 1801, gives the lowest population figure for Brampton: 1801. The highest 19th-century count of 1,281, came in 1851.

Parish	1911	1921	1931	1951	1961	1971	1981	1991	2001	2011
Brampton	895	930	1,031	1,718	3,068	4,494	4,363	4,508	5,030	4,862

All population census figures are from the report Historic Census figures Cambridgeshire to 2011 by Cambridgeshire Insight.

In 2011, the parish covered an area of 3,558 acres (1,440 hectares), making the density of population 874.6 per square mile (337.6 per square km).

== Amenities ==
The village has retail, medical, dental and veterinary services. Brampton Garden Centre is run by Notcutts, and won an award in 2008 as the best Garden Centre Restaurant in the North Thames area.

The Grange Hotel, Brampton, once a private residence, closed in 2013 for conversion into housing. A large 18th-century brick building, it had been requisitioned in the Second World War for the American Eighth Air Force. RAF Brampton closed in 2013. Its land was sold for development, with plans submitted for up to 402 new houses.

Brampton has regular buses (route 66) to St Neots, Hinchingbrooke, Huntingdon and Tesco, run by Whippet (bus company). The nearest rail service is at Huntingdon railway station, 1 1/2 miles (2.5 km) to the east.

Brampton Park has an 18-hole golf course featuring the par-3 4th, a signature hole with a green almost completely surrounded by water, often claimed as England's hardest par-3. The village has a large skate park on the Memorial Playing Fields, alongside the Memorial Hall, and in 2013 a Multi Users Games Area (MUGA) was opened. There are also pitches for Association Football and cricket. Huntingdon Racecourse lies within the parish.

== Education ==
Brampton has one school: Brampton Village Primary School. It was classed as good in all main criteria at the most recent Ofsted inspection in March 2012. The previous infants' and junior schools merged in 2007.

The village falls within the catchment area of Hinchingbrooke School

== Religious sites ==
The Anglican church of St Mary Magdalene shares clergy with the parishes of Ellington and Grafham. The Methodist Church on The Green belongs to the St Neots and Huntingdon circuit.

== Notable people ==
- Geoff Capes, the Commonwealth shot-put champion and twice winner of the title World's Strongest Man, served as a police officer in Brampton in the 1970s.
- Samuel Pepys, diarist famous for his written accounts of historical events during the Stuart period, lived in his uncle, Robert Pepys' house in Brampton while attending Huntingdon Grammar School in 1644. He was due to inherit the house and is reported to have wanted to retire there.
- Carla Humphrey, women's footballer who plays for Liverpool FC.
