= Lyubow Usava =

Lyubow Demeetriyevna Usava
- Born: 6 September 1921; Irkutsk, USSR
- Died: 2 January 2015 (aged 93); Minsk, Belarus
- Other names: Belarusian: Любоў Дзмітрыеўна Усава
- Occupation: Architect
- Years active: 1947–1989
- Notable work: Maksim Gorky Central Children's Park
- Spouse: Vasily Gerashchenko

Lyubow Demeetriyevna Usava (Belarusian: Любоў Дзмітрыеўна Усава also sometimes transliterated as Lyubov Demeetriyevna Oosava) (6 September 1921 – 2 January 2015) was a Russian-born Belarusian architect. After World War II, she and her husband moved to Minsk and worked on the restoration of the city. She was involved in many projects ranging from schools and government buildings to parks and reservoirs. In 1989, her name was inscribed in the Book of Honor of the Minsk Project Institute.

== Biography ==
Usava was born on 6 September 1921 in Irkutsk, Russia. When she was nine, her family moved to Moscow where she attended high school and then entered the Moscow Institute of Architecture. In 1941, the school was changed into a processing facility for the war. Students were required to package and prepare demolition bombs for use against German tanks. Simultaneously, Usava enrolled in nursing courses to be able to assist with helping the war wounded. In October 1942, a decision was made to evacuate the students to Tashkent, Uzbekistan. Students were allowed only what they could carry, no excesses, and traveled in freight cars, while the instructors were in the passenger section of the transport trains. It took over a month for the students to reach the Tashkent Institute, where they slept underneath the desks at which they studied during the day. Four days a week they were required to study architecture and the other three days a week they worked in a munitions factory.

At the end of the year, Usava was selected to make a study trip to measure monuments in Bukhara and later another trip to Samarkand, on which she met her future husband Vasily Gerashchenko. After the Battle of Stalingrad, when it was clear that victory would defeat Nazi Germany, the students began returning home. Usava returned in the spring of 1944, married and she and her husband moved into the dormitory at the Institute. She graduated with honors in 1947 with a degree in architecture and soon moved to Minsk, Belarus, where her husband was working.

Within two days of arrival, Usava became employed in the workshop Yuri Yegorov, which later became the Minsk Project Institute and set about with other architects to restore the city of Minsk. Her first project was the secondary school number 42 on what is now Komsomolskaya Street. That was soon followed by restoration of the Belarusian Society of Deaf-mutes and the building on Dolgobrodskaya Street for the State Archive. She most often worked with Alexander Voinov (Belarusian: Александром Воиновым) and together, they worked on such projects as the Minsk Youth Theatre, the Palace of Pioneers and the building of the regional committee of the PBC (now Minsk Commonwealth of Independent States Executive Secretariat building). She also worked with L. Ryminskim to restore the buildings of the Belarusian Polytechnic Institute. Both alone and in collaborative projects Usava built many houses, schools and kindergartens. She participated in the creation of Victory Park at the National Opera and Ballet of Belarus and she designed the reconstruction of Maksim Gorky Central Children's Park. In the 1970s, as part of a citywide effort to solve the flooding issues of the city, she worked on the Blackbird reservoir and the Krynica reservoir both on the Svislach River, the largest reservoir in Belarus known as the Zaslavskoye reservoir, and the water/green space plan for the outskirts of Minsk.

In 1989, Usava was inducted into the Minsk Project Institute's Book of Honor and she retired in 1990 after 43 years of service.
