= Yeshua Tova Synagogue =

Chabad synagogue in Bucharest, Romania

Yeshua Tova Synagogue (Podul Mogoşoaiei Synagogue)
- Romanian: Sinagoga Eșua Tova
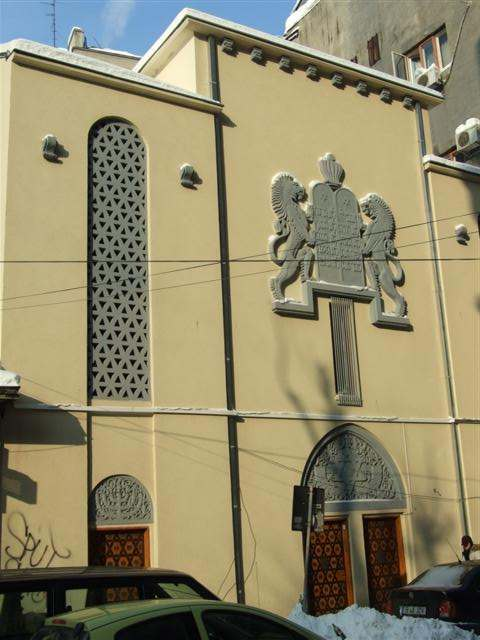
- The synagogue façade, in 2008

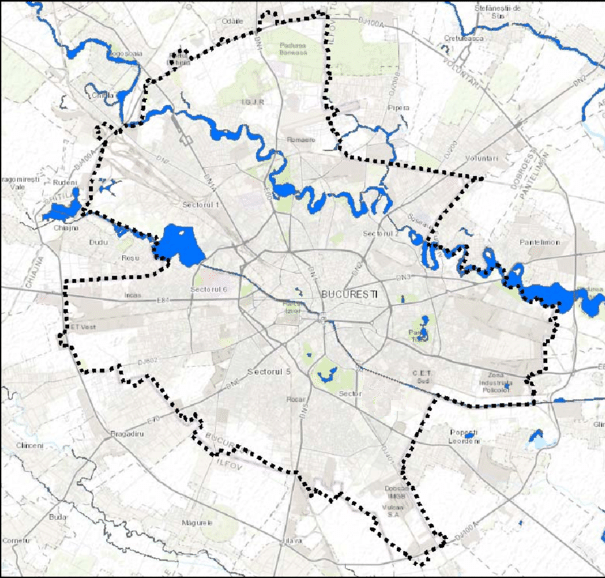
- Location of the synagogue in Bucharest

Religion
- Affiliation: Hasidic Judaism
- Rite: Nusach Ashkenaz
- Ecclesiastical or organisational status: Synagogue
- Leadership: Rabbi Naftali Deutsch
- Status: Active

Location
- Location: 9 Tache Ionescu Street, Bucharest
- Country: Romania
- Coordinates: 44°26′39.38″N 26°5′50.14″E

Architecture
- Type: Synagogue architecture
- Style: Moorish Revival
- Established: 1868 (as a congregation)
- Completed: 1827
- Materials: Brick

The Yeshua Tova Synagogue (Romanian: Sinagoga Eșua Tova), also known as the Podul Mogoşoaiei Synagogue (Romanian: Sinagoga Podul Mogoşoaiei), is a Hasidic Jewish congregation and synagogue, located at 9 Tache Ionescu Street, near Piaţa Amzei and Piața Romană metro station, in Bucharest, Romania. Designed in the Moorish Revival style, the synagogue was completed in 1827, and is the city's oldest synagogue.

Rabbi Naftali Deutsch is the head Chabad emissary of Romania, and has served as a Chabad emissary for 23 years.

It was built in 1827 and renovated in 2007. Bas-reliefs decorate the tympanums above the frontal doors and the upper part of the façade.

== See also ==
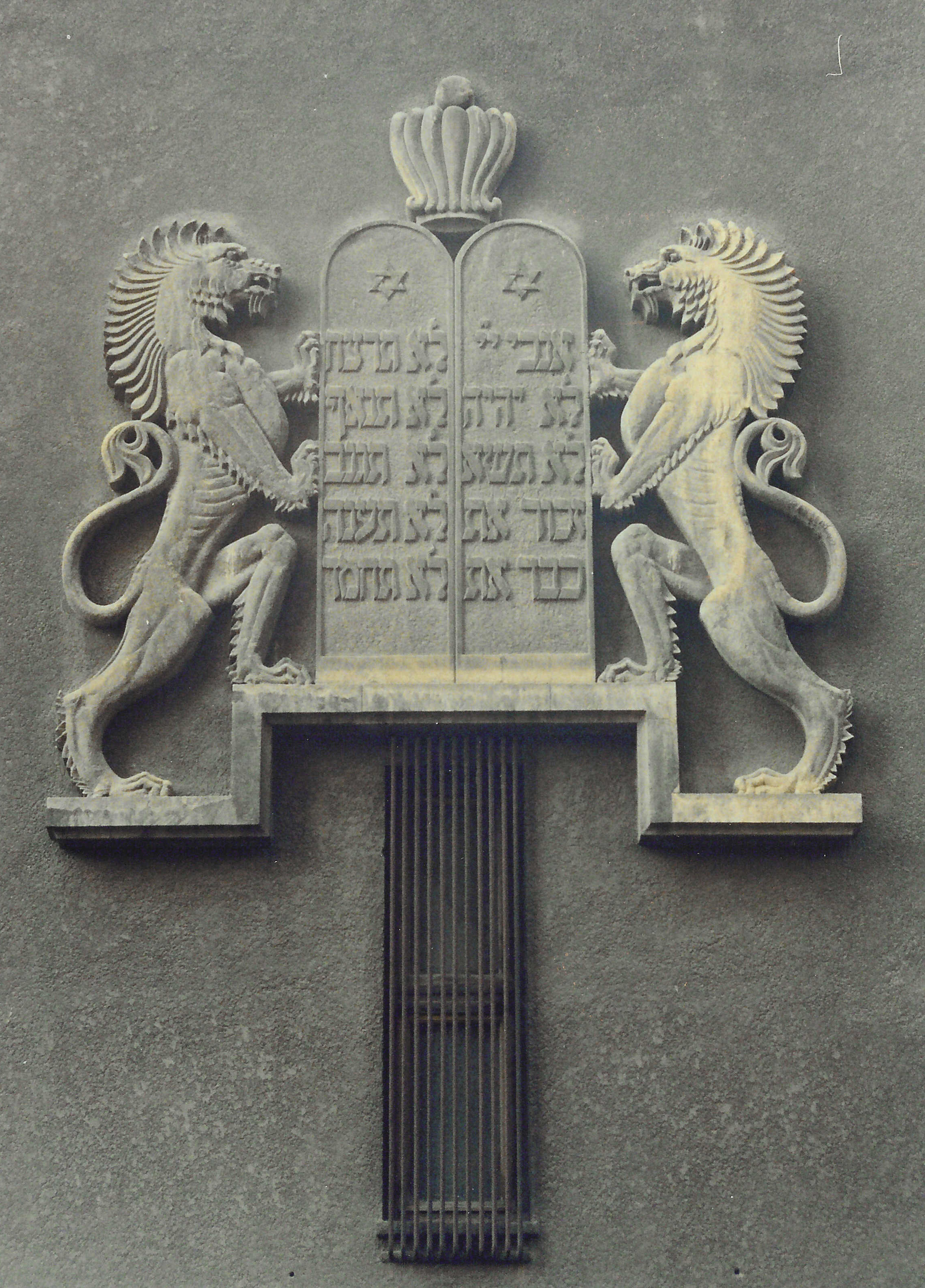
Relief of the Ten Commandments on the Yeshua Tova Synagogue

- History of the Jews in Romania
- List of synagogues in Romania
