= Huntingdon and Godmanchester =

Former municipal borough in Huntingdonshire, United Kingdom

Coordinates: 52.319°N 0.175°W

- Area
  - 1961: 7,057 acres (28.56 km^{2})
- Population
  - 1961: 8,821
- History
  - Created: 1961
  - Abolished: 1974
  - Succeeded by: Huntingdon District
- Status: Municipal borough
  - HQ: Huntingdon

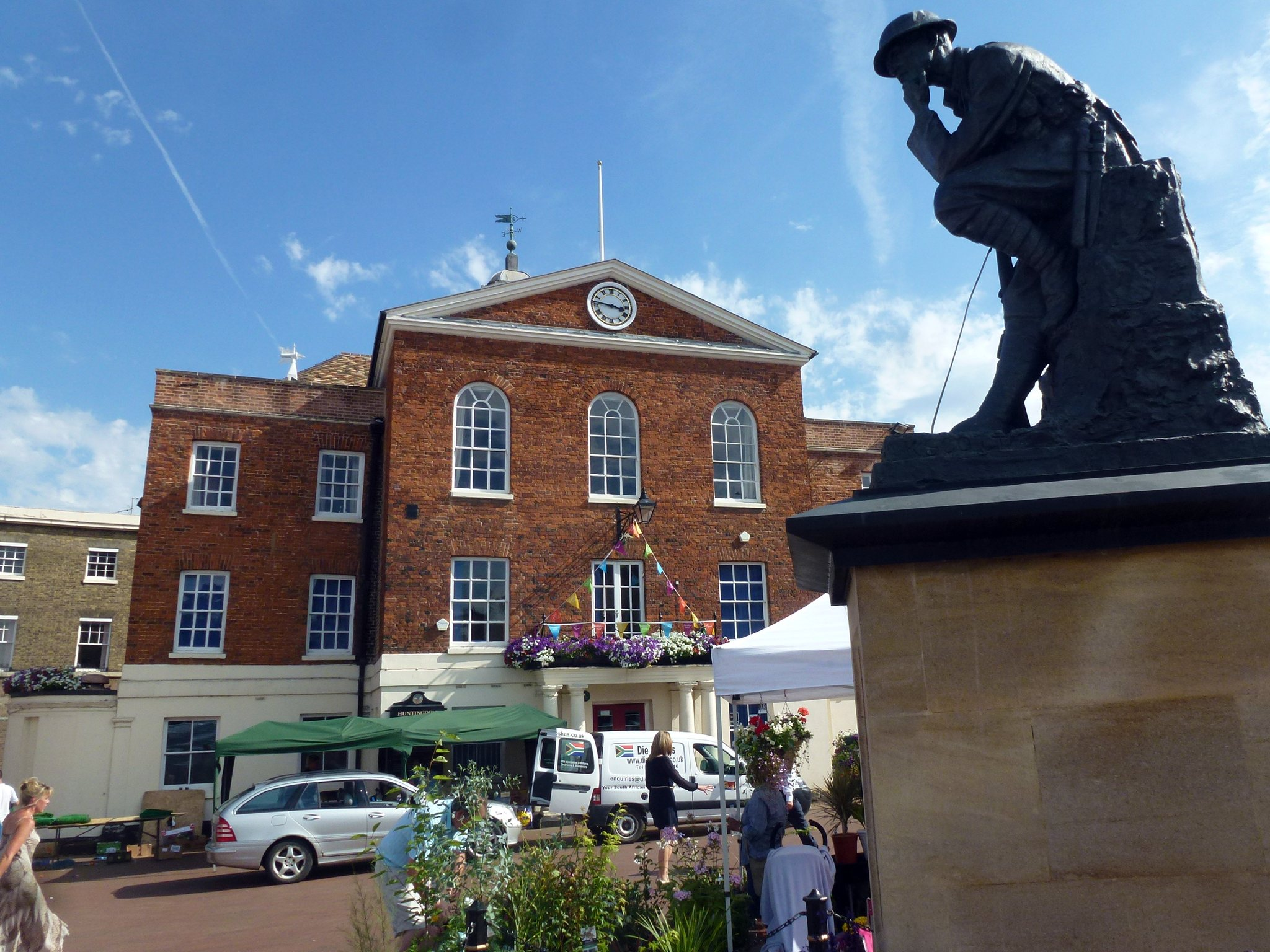
Huntingdon

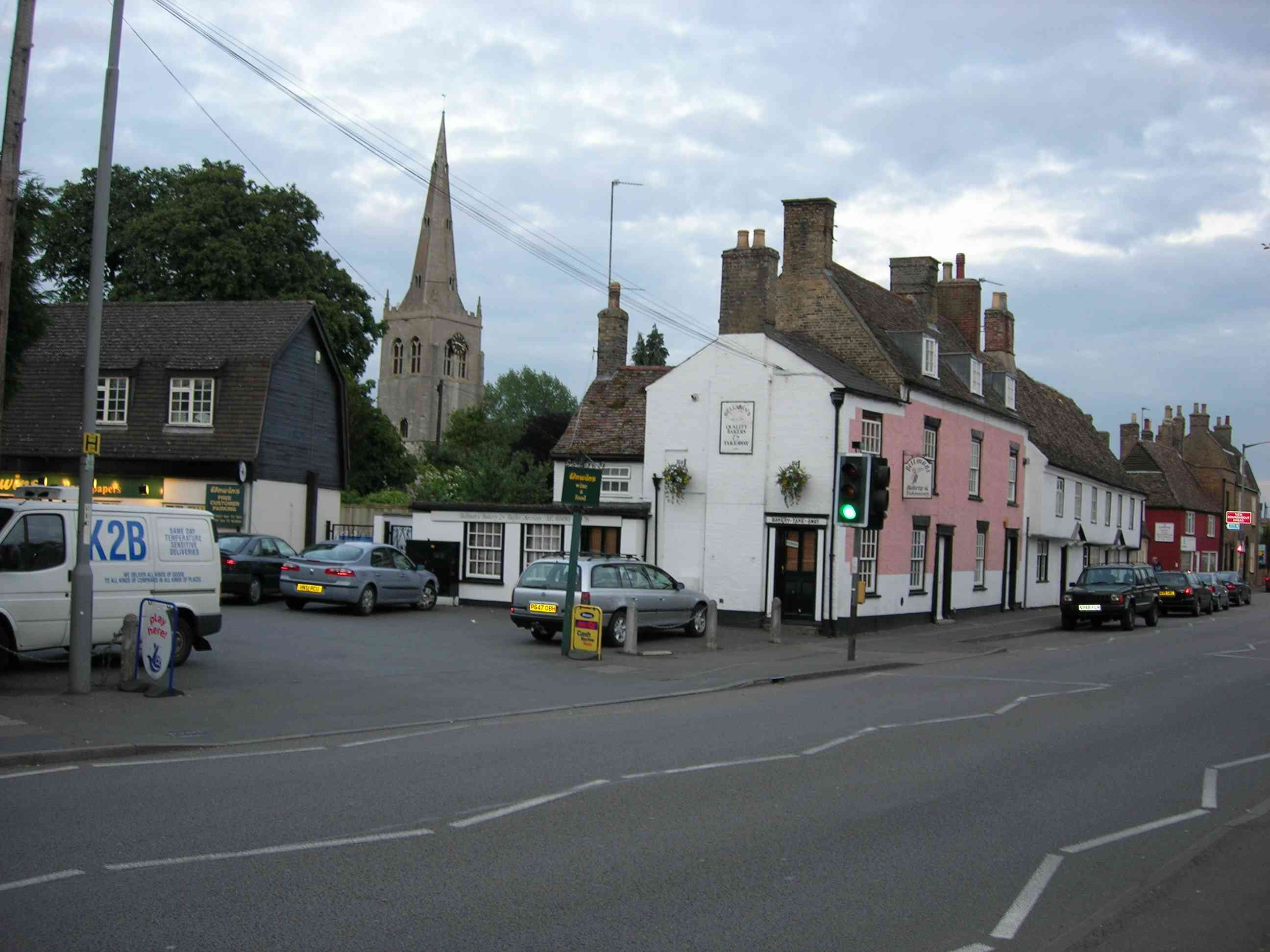
Godmanchester

Huntingdon and Godmanchester was a municipal borough in Huntingdonshire (and then Huntingdon and Peterborough) from 1961 to 1974.

It was formed on 1 April 1961 by the merger of the boroughs of Huntingdon and Godmanchester. In 1974, under the Local Government Act 1972 the borough was abolished, and a successor parish formed within Huntingdon District, in the non-metropolitan county of Cambridgeshire. The parish had the status of a town, by resolution of the parish council.

The borough was granted a coat of arms in 1963, which illustrated the union of the two towns. The shield was divided horizontally in a dovetail pattern to show the joining of two municipalities. At the top of the shield were two hunting horns for Huntingdon, and at the base a fleur-de-lis from the common seal of Godmanchester. The supporters on either side of the shield were described as a "medieval huntsman" and a "medieval oxherd", and they stood upon a representation of the old bridge at Huntingdon that linked the two towns. The motto was United We Advance.

On 1 April 1982 the union of the two towns ended, with the formation of two separate civil parishes of Huntingdon and Godmanchester, each governed by a town council. In 1961 the parish had a population of 8821.
