= Godmanchester Chinese Bridge =

Bridge in Godmanchester, Cambridgeshire, England

Coordinates: 52.31926°N 0.17582°W

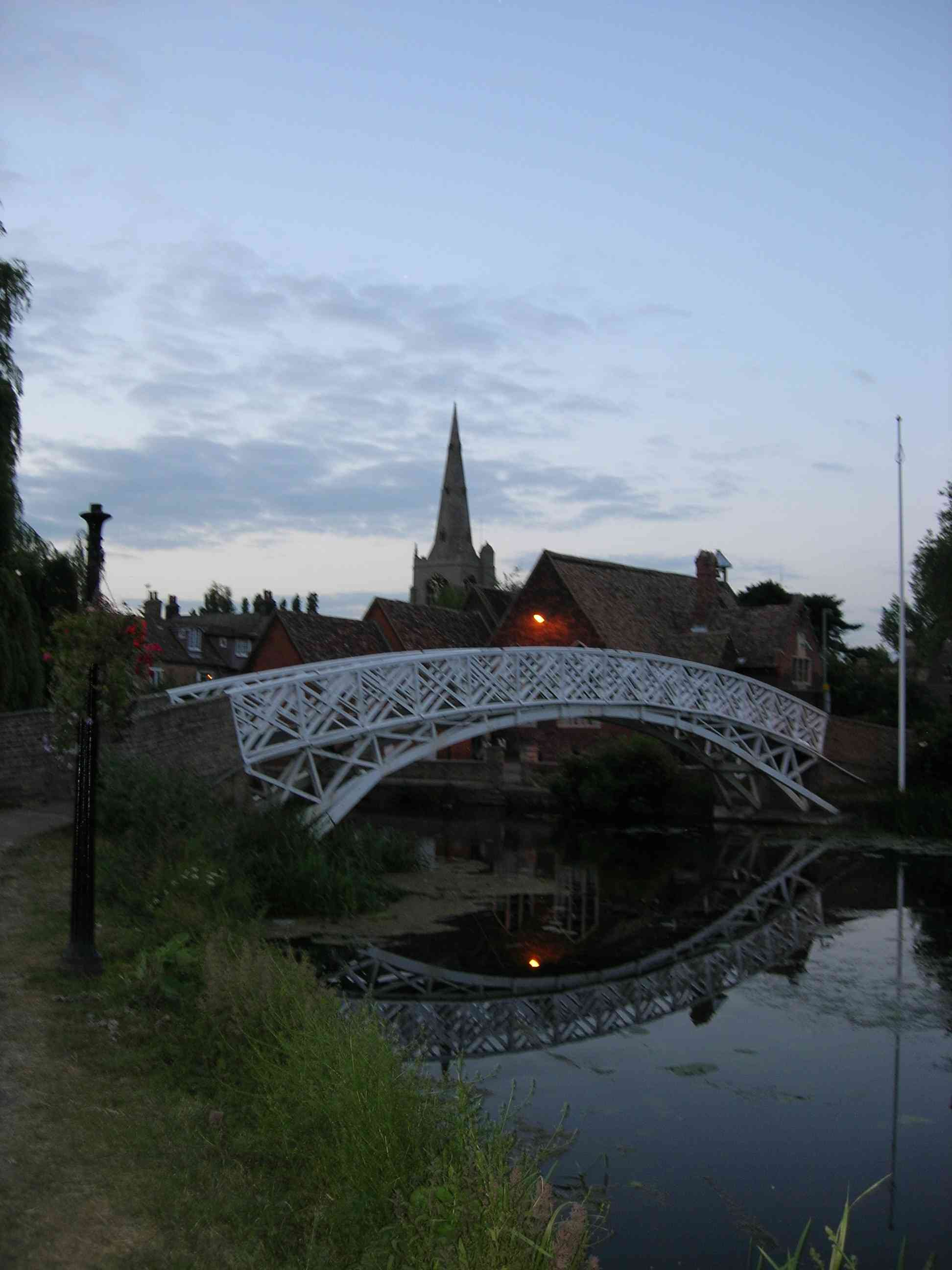
The bridge in Godmanchester

Godmanchester Chinese Bridge is a Grade II listed building and landmark of the town of Godmanchester, Huntingdonshire (now administered as part of Cambridgeshire, England). It is a pedestrian bridge that spans a mill stream on the River Great Ouse and is, as the name suggests, built in an ostensibly Chinese style. The original was constructed in 1827 to designs by the architect James Gallier, but the wooden span fell into a bad condition and was replaced with a replica by the local council in 1960.

The origins of the bridge are somewhat unusual. "Chinese Chippendale" had been a fashion of the mid-18th century, a time when the town was building a mansion for the Receiver General of Huntingdonshire by the river. Island Hall had included a rather smaller Chinese bridge, linking it to an ornamental island. It seems likely that this served as the inspiration for the public bridge several decades later – its white timbers are also in the Chinese Chippendale style.

The wooden span of the bridge was removed by crane on 9 February 2010. A replica, built in Yorkshire by CTS Bridges, was put into position on 15 and 16 February.

== In popular culture ==
The bridge was the subject of the song "Godmanchester Chinese Bridge" by The Howl & The Hum.
