= Ouse Valley Way =

150-mile footpath in eastern England

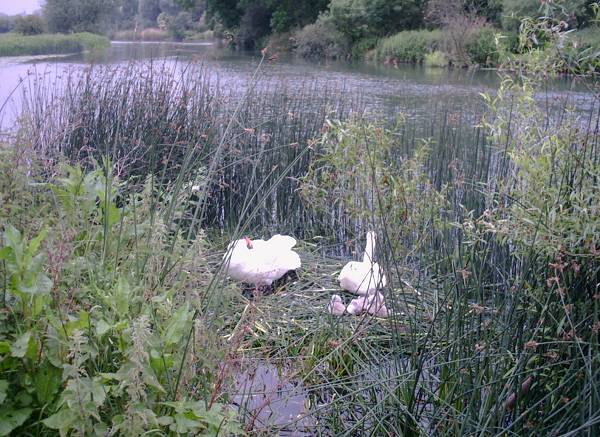
Swans nesting beside the Great Ouse near St Neots

The Ouse Valley Way is a 150-mile (240 km) footpath in England, following the River Great Ouse from its source near Syresham in Northamptonshire to its mouth in The Wash near King's Lynn. The path begins outside the King's Head pub in Syresham (52.0683°N 1.0807°W) and ends on the Green Quay in King's Lynn (52.7512°N 0.3935°E).

There is a long-term plan to complete remaining gaps in the path, meanwhile it is possible to walk the entire route, although in places the footpath and river temporarily part company.

The route passes many interesting places and there is much to see, including attractive countryside, pretty villages, ancient English market towns, churches and a cathedral, and abundant wildlife.

Towns from source to mouth include Buckingham, Milton Keynes, Olney, Bedford, St Neots, Huntingdon, St Ives, Ely, Downham Market, and King's Lynn.

The route is way-marked and maintained by The Countryside Agency who also provide maps and written guides online.

A small section of the Ouse Valley Way is used on the Pathfinder March.
