= Peter Boston =

British architect and illustrator

Peter Shakerley Boston MC (10 September 1918 – 19 November 1999) was a British architect and illustrator, best known for the illustrations he made to the books written by his mother, author Lucy M. Boston (1892–1990), who wrote under the name L.M. Boston. The best known of these books were the Green Knowe books. In those illustrations, Peter Boston included items from his mother's home, The Manor in Hemingford Grey, Cambridgeshire, one of the oldest continuously inhabited houses in Britain.

== Personal life ==
Boston was born in Looe, Cornwall, to Harold and Lucy Maria Boston. Peter's father left his wife in 1935, but the couple's only son continued to live with both.

Boston married Diana Robertson, a widow with two sons, in 1967. They had two children together, Kate and Harriet, and lived in a converted mill in Hertfordshire; however, the Bostons moved into The Manor when Boston's mother died in 1990, making repairs and opening the ancient home to visitors. Boston's widow, Diana Boston, continues to preside over the house, and was still leading tours in 2010.

Boston served with the Royal Engineers in North Africa in World War II. He received the Military Cross for his service.

Boston died at Ashwell, Hertfordshire.

== Architectural career ==
Boston began reading Engineering at King's College, Cambridge, but later switched to Architecture, and graduated with a first. He furthered his architectural training at Liverpool University after World War II, and worked as an architect for the rest of his life, even after he began illustrating his mother's books.

Boston joined a firm in 1956 that eventually became Saunders Boston, which had offices in London, Cambridge and Liverpool. The firm remains in existence in Cambridge. Boston's best-known architectural work are his private homes in Hertfordshire and Cambridgeshire. Amongst Boston's more notable designs are Black Swan House, built in London in 1975 for the Worshipful Company of Vintners but now razed; Gilmerton Court on the Trumpington Road in Cambridge, the Fisher Building at St. John's College, Cambridge and the Mong Building at Sidney Sussex College. In Boston's obituary, The Independent stated, "Boston managed to show sympathy for both neighbours in a design which is intricate, picturesque and self-effacing, housing a music room and other functions."

One of Boston's creations, the house he designed in 1959 for artist Elisabeth Vellacott, sister of classical scholar Philip Vellacott, served as the basis of the home in Rebecca Stott's 2007 novel Ghostwalk.

== Illustrator career ==
In 1939, while Boston was still at university, Lucy Boston bought The Manor, which was to so suffuse the Green Knowe books. Mother and son worked together to refurbish the house, which dates to the time of the Norman Conquest.

Boston's mother based the fictional character Tolly (short for Toseland) on her son Peter. Visitors to the Manor can still see many of the rooms and items that inspired Peter Boston's illustrations. These include the mirror that first greets Tolly and Tolly's magical Japanese mouse of carved wood, which Diana Boston called "the most important thing in the house." Mrs. Boston said that the sight of the toy, a favourite feature of the novels, would provoke adults to nostalgic tears.

In addition to illustrating his mother's books for children, Boston illustrated the dust jackets of L.M. Boston's adult books, Yew Hall (1954) and Persephone (1969).
