= Fraser family of artists =

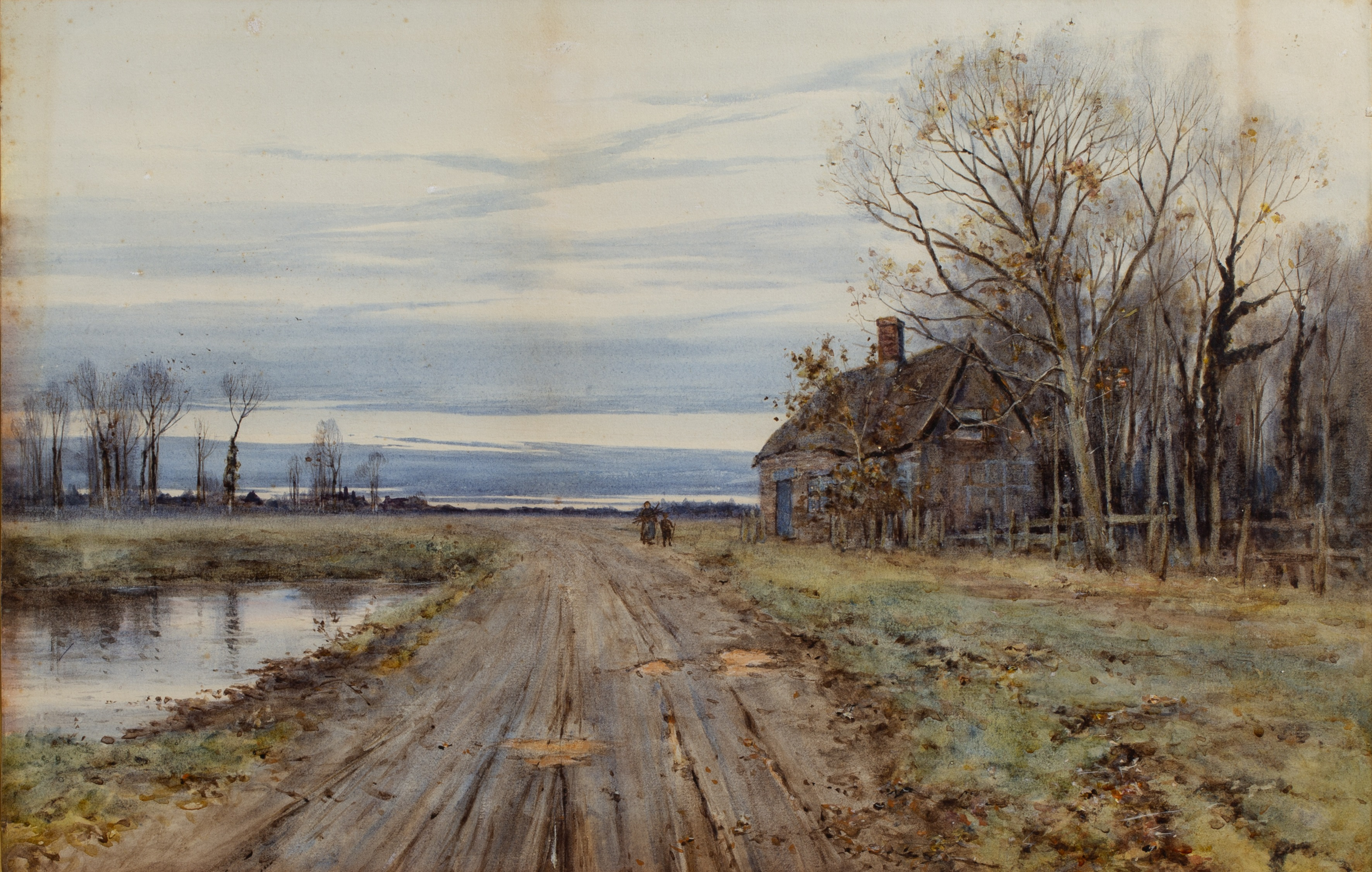
Robert Winter Fraser (1872-1930), A faggot gatherer with child companion passing a cottage on a country lane, watercolour, 34 x 53cm

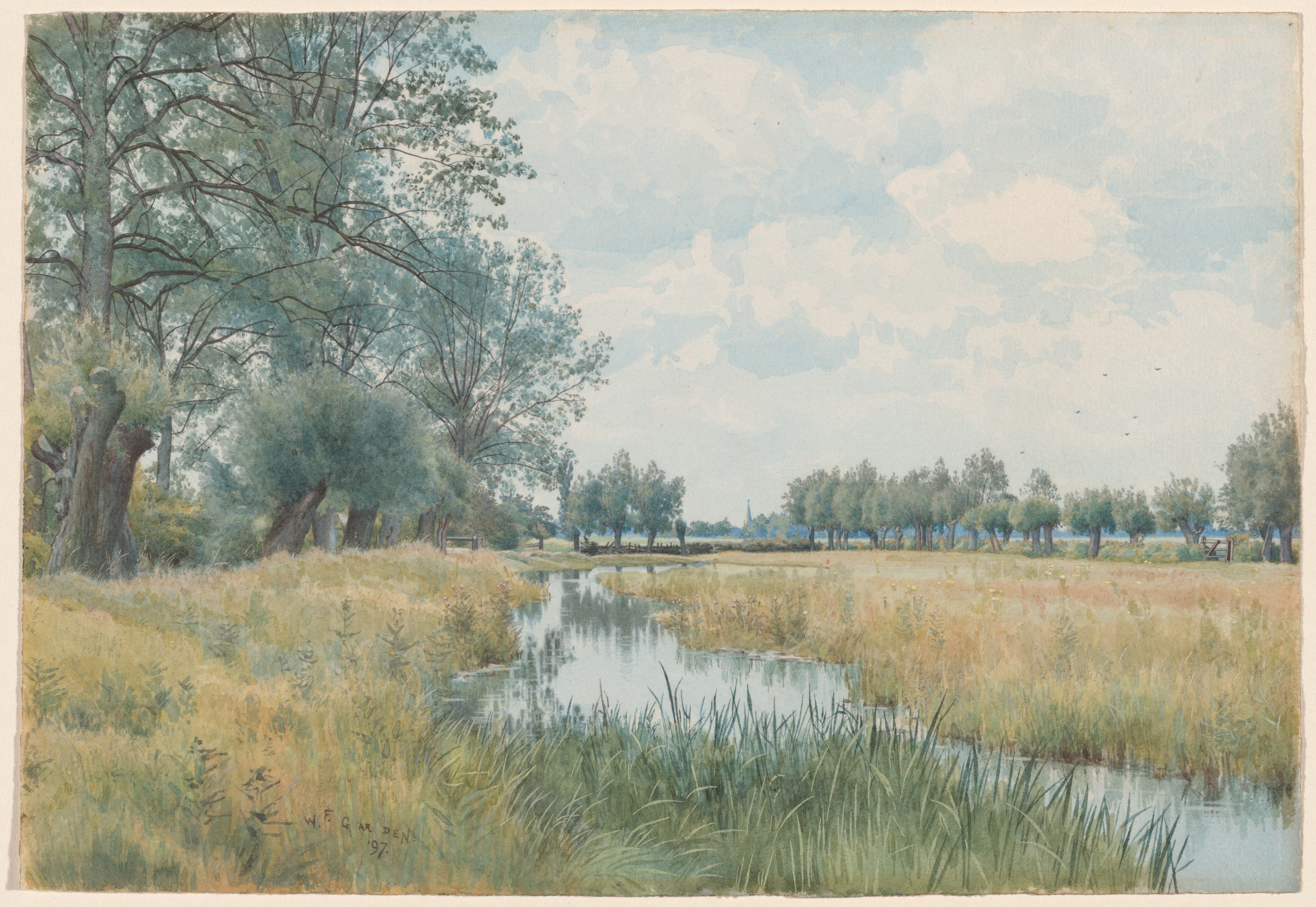
William Fraser Garden, River Landscape near St. Ives, Huntingdonshire, 1897, National Gallery of Art, 19 × 28 cm (7 × 11 in.)

The Fraser family of artists or Frasers of Huntingdonshire, of Scottish origin and based in the area around Bedford in England from 1861, were a family of artists. They are known largely for their landscape watercolour paintings, the predominant subject matter of which was the rural landscape of The Fens. Their paintings therefore usually contain stretches of still water, typically reaching the front of the picture space, and few if any figures. Many show scenes when the trees have lost their leaves. They were in general rather small by the standards of the day, and often had wide and thin picture spaces. Although several of the family made considerable use of bodycolour (gouache), they rarely painted in oils, unlike many contemporaries who moved between both media. According to a family member, there "never was a Fraser who did not draw", but the main artistic production of two of the family was line illustrations for books and magazines.

Six of the group were the sons of an army surgeon from Findrack, Lumphanan, Aberdeenshire, Major Robert Winchester Fraser (1819–1892) and his wife Mary Ann Anderson (1820–1898), who married in 1842 and produced a total of nine children. After moving around, presumably because of the father's job, in his retirement the family settled in Bedford in 1861. There was one son, Michie, who worked for the Consular Service and remained a bachelor. One of his sisters, Catherine, was his housekeeper. There is a suggestion that she and the other sister Margaret may also have painted.

The painters in the first generation were Francis Arthur Fraser (Corfu, 1846–1924), Robert Winchester Fraser (Scotland, 1848–1906), Garden William Fraser (Chatham, Kent 1856–1921), George Gordon Fraser (Cramond, Edinburgh 1859–1895), Arthur Anderson Fraser (Bedford 1861–1904), and Gilbert Baird Fraser (Bedford 1865–1947). In the second generation were the two sons of Robert Winchester Fraser (by different wives): Robert James Winchester Fraser (Harrowden, Bedfordshire, 1872–1930), better known as Robert Winter Fraser or Robert Winter, and Francis Gordon Fraser (1879–1931). Other members of the family, including the women, probably painted, but have not left clear trails; there are also several other Frasers (and Frazers) who painted watercolours in the 19th century and were not related.

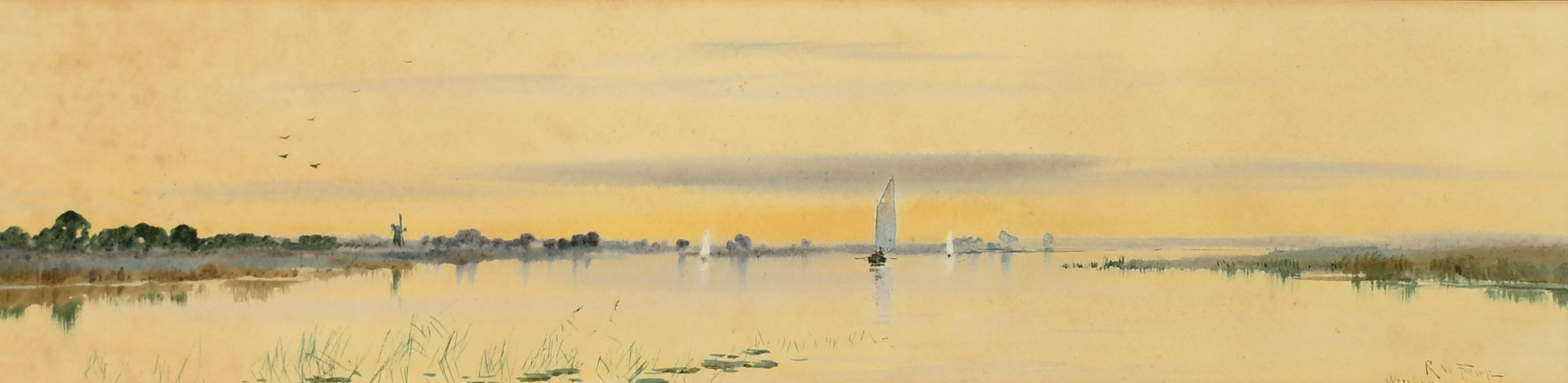
Robert Winchester Fraser, Wroxham, 4.5 x 21 in.

Perhaps because of their rather austere subjects and treatment, and the generally small size of their works, none of the family achieved the considerable financial success of some Victorian watercolourists. In the 19th century Robert Winchester Fraser was the most prominent, but by the mid-20th century the taste of the day had come to favour his son Robert Winter Fraser. Since perhaps the 1970s William Fraser Garden has decisively overtaken the rest of the family, with his best works being bought for American collections for several times the prices the others can achieve.

== Francis Arthur Fraser ==
The first Fraser to paint was Francis Arthur (1846–1924), generally known as Frank. He was a prolific and well-known illustrator, though he also painted and exhibited in watercolour and oils. Born in Corfu, he attended Bedford Grammar School from 1861-1863, then moved to London in 1864. His illustrations appeared in several magazines from 1867 onwards, with nearly 200 illustrations by 1871 in Good Words, a Scottish evangelical magazine that made a selling point of fine illustrations.

From the 1870s he illustrated books, including Great Expectations (Chapman and Hall, 1871), King Arthur and his Knights of the Round Table by Henry Frith (George Routledge, 1884), Mark Twain's Roughing It and The Innocents At Home (Chatto & Windus, 1897), A Hero. Philip’s Book by Dinah Maria Mulock Craik (George Routledge, 1889) and a number of books by Maria Edgeworth, published by George Routledge.

== Robert Winchester Fraser and his sons ==
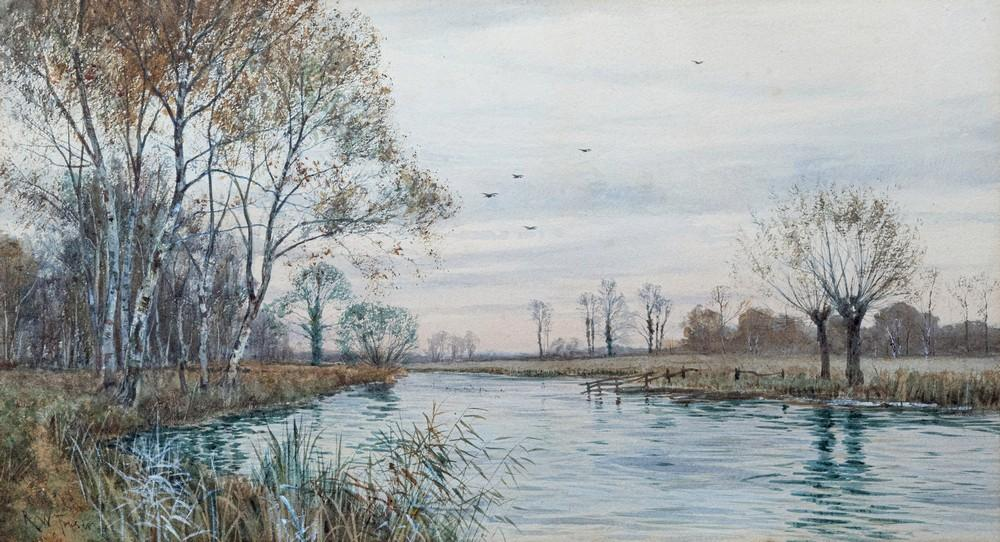
Robert Winchester Fraser, Along the River Ouse, Bedfordshire, watercolour, 1886, 11 x 21 in. (30 x 54cm.)

Next was Robert Winchester Fraser (1848–1906), who received a degree of recognition in his own lifetime. His pictures were regularly exhibited, including at the Royal Academy and Royal Scottish Academy, and he can probably be said to have established the family style. He generally signed his work 'R. W. Fraser'. He was sufficiently successful to be able to rent the Manor House at Hemingford Grey, a village between Huntingdon and St. Ives, Cambridgeshire. This is architecturally an important house, claimed to be the oldest continually inhabited house in England, with 12th-century parts. The gardens end at the Ouse, with a moat on the other sides. The village features in many paintings by the family, and artist friends. He was more widely travelled than his artistic siblings, at one point receiving a commission to go and paint in Jamaica. He died while staying at the Bristol Hotel, Gibraltar,. on his way to visit his brother Michie at Málaga.

=== His sons ===
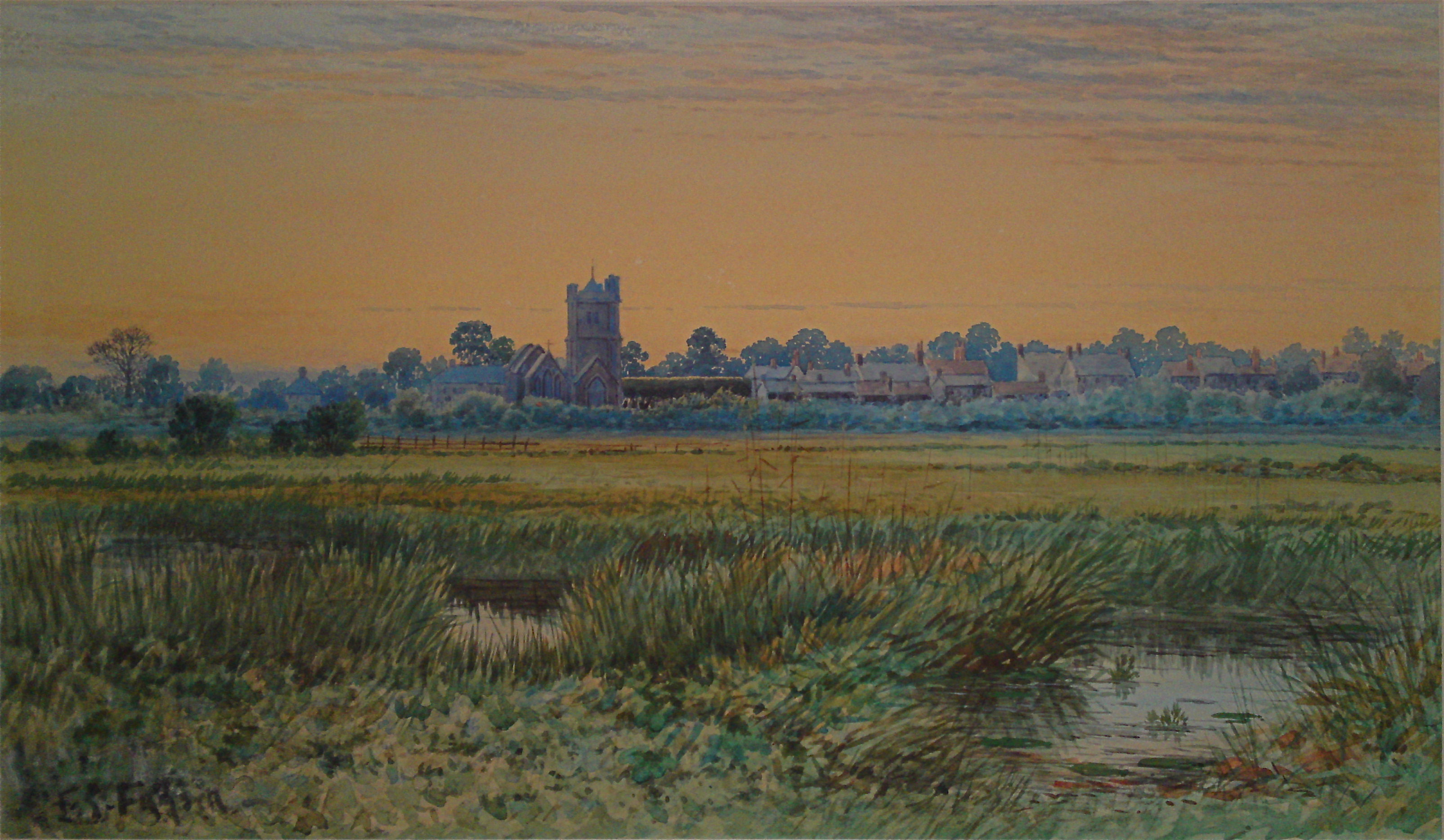
Watercolour painting by Francis Gordon Fraser (1879–1931)

Both his sons were also painters. The elder, Robert James Winchester Fraser (1872–1930) signed his pictures 'R. Winter' or Robert Winter, to distinguish them from those by his father; he is often referred to as Robert Winter Fraser, though still very often confused with his father by the art trade. Though less commercially successful than his father in his lifetime, Winter’s paintings have come to be well regarded and these days tend to sell at similar prices in auction. The Dictionary of British Watercolour Artists calls him "the best known, and perhaps the best, of the family", saying his "clear, rather acidic and photographic watercolours of the Fens and the Ouse have great merit".

The younger son, Francis Gordon Fraser (1879–1931) "was probably the most prolific, yet least recorded member of the famous Huntingdonshire family of landscape painters" (Jeremy Wood, Hidden Talents). "The quality of his work is variable and this has affected its value." Perhaps realising that he was in danger of flooding the market single-handedly, he signed his work in a variety of ways. Besides F. G. Fraser, he is known to have also used F. Gordon, Alex Gordon and quite possibly several other names. His huge output was driven by penury and it would seem that many of his paintings were hurriedly completed, though there are a few in circulation of a higher standard and with greater attention to detail. It is not known how much time he spent in or around The Fens region where his brother and uncles lived. His pictures of the area may possibly have been depicted from memory, imagination or his recollection of his father’s work, given that he mostly lived in south-west London. Two of his pictures were shown at the Devon and Exeter Annual Exhibition in 1907.

== William Fraser Garden ==
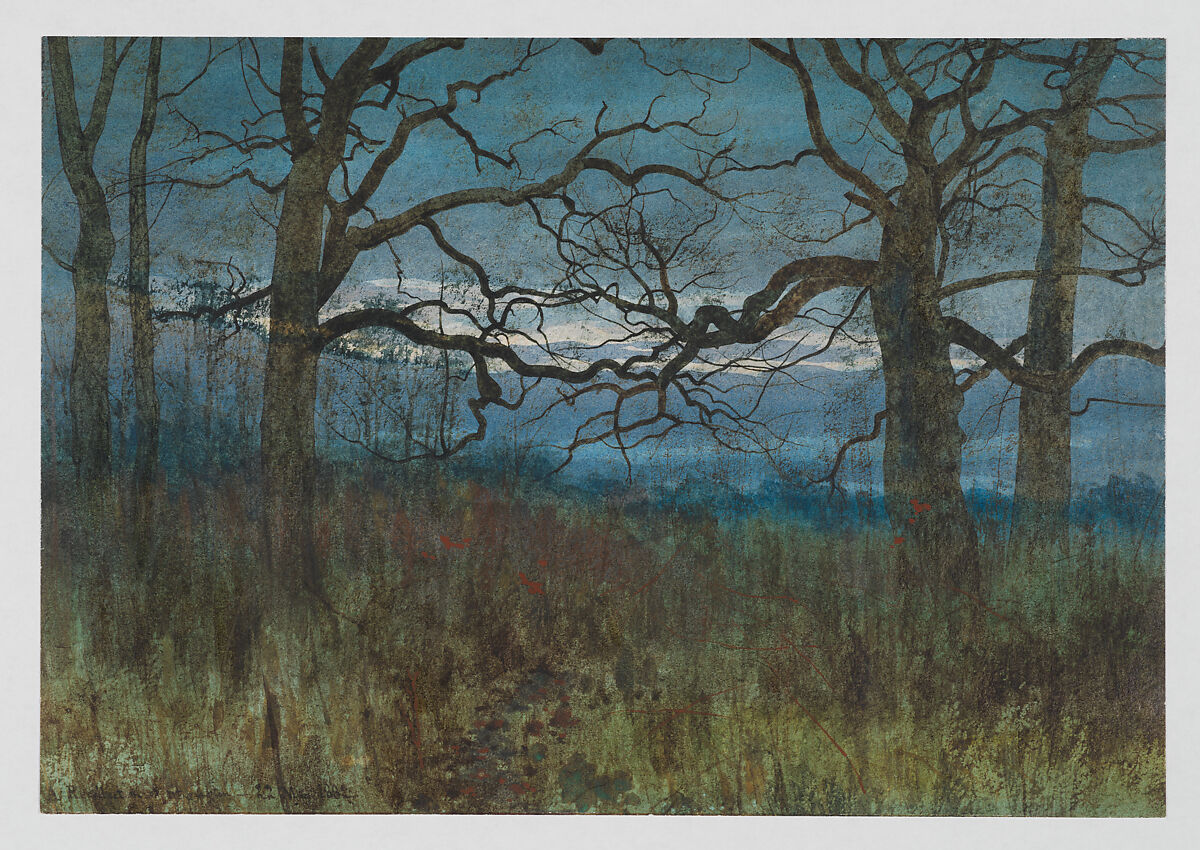
A Recollection of Stevington, Bedfordshire–A Spinney in December, 1882, William Fraser Garden, Metropolitan Museum of Art, 8 × 7 in. (22 × 18 cm)

Born William Garden Fraser, William Fraser Garden (1856–1921), the third brother of the first generation to paint, changed his name to avoid confusion with his brothers, and usually signed work "W F Garden". He painted relatively little, but in the 1880s sold work through the Dowdeswell Gallery in New Bond Street, London. However, this arrangement seems to have ended by 1890, and he thereafter relied on local commissions. He struggled with his finances and saw little return on his now very collectable paintings. Declared bankrupt in 1899, his money difficulties almost certainly contributed to the marital problems he endured with his wife Ethel. Together they produced 6 children but by 1906, Ethel had lost patience with the struggling artist and removed herself and the children to Birmingham. Garden William lived the rest of his life in a room at the Old Ferry Boat Inn in Holywell, Cambridgeshire. His distinctive work, which often has an almost photographic quality, is usually signed W. F. Garden; he may have adopted this version of his name not only to distinguish it from the rest of his family, but also to confuse creditors. Perhaps his most famous work is The Wood At Dusk, which is available in reproduction.

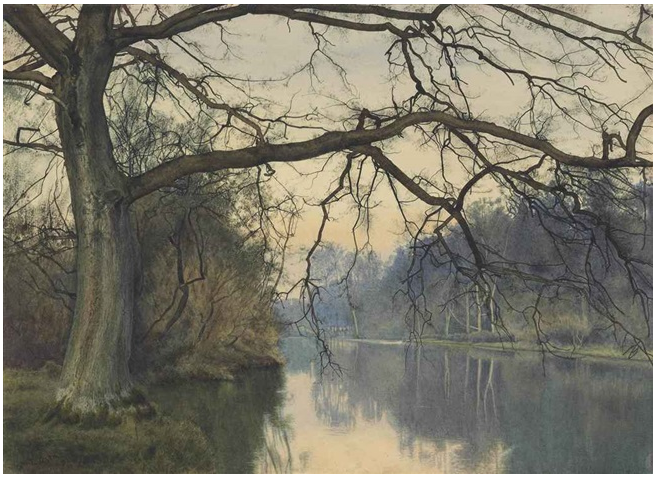
William Fraser Garden A Great Tree on a Riverbank, 1892

His watercolours have received much more attention in recent decades, and are now usually the most expensive of the clan; some remain at price levels comparable to those of his relatives, but the most appreciated far outstrip these. The Cleveland Museum of Art acquired a densely packed Trees and Undergrowth in 1978 (though the London dealer Christopher White). The Metropolitan Museum of Art in New York, which has acquired two of his watercolours in the 21st century, describes him as "One of the most remarkable watercolorists of the late nineteenth century". The Washington DC National Gallery of Art acquired one in 2017. In 2012 A Great Tree on a Riverbank of 1892 more than doubled its high estimate at Christie's to realize £32,450, and in the same sale a version of The Bridge at St Ives, Huntingdonshire (different from that in the Metropolitan Museum of Art) realized £10,625. A third picture, Houghton Mill, near St Ives, Huntingdonshire, realized £23,750. At an earlier Christie's auction three watercolours by Garden realized over £40,000 in total.

== George Gordon Fraser ==
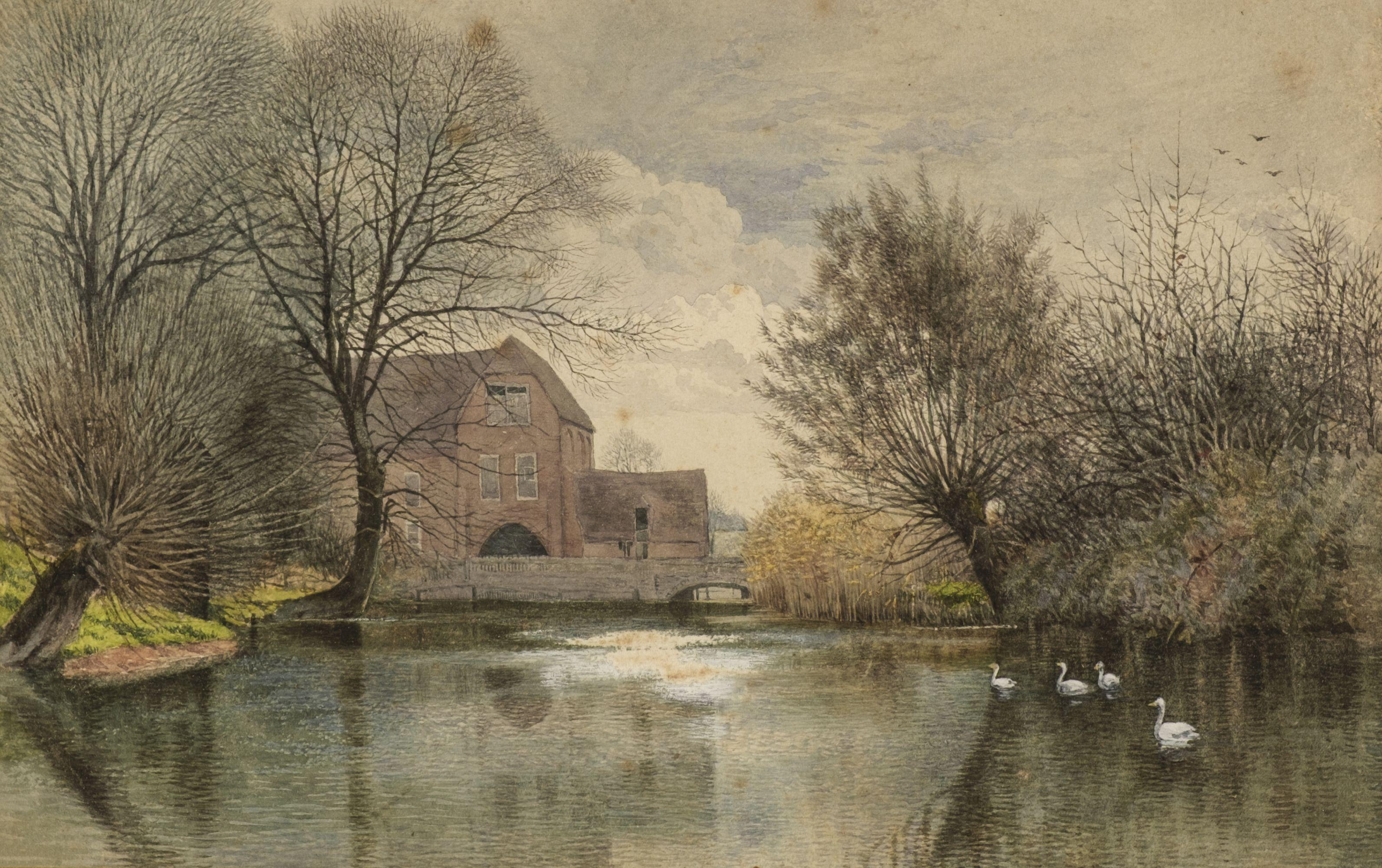
George Gordon Fraser, The Old Mill, 17 x 25 cm (7 x 10 ins)

George Gordon Fraser (1859–1895), like his eldest brother Frank, showed great promise as an illustrator. His drawings and cartoons appeared in Fun magazine and he provided "upwards of one hundred and twenty illustrations" for an 1891 edition of Jerome K. Jerome's comic novel The Diary of a Pilgrimage. A reprinted version of this is still available though fails to credit G.G. Fraser as the artist. He also painted, in watercolours and occasionally in oils, signing 'G. Gordon Fraser' or using his initials. William Andrew Baird Grove, in his booklet The Frasers – A Local Family of Artists (1980) describes George Gordon's work as "a wide variety of Fen scenes of painstaking detail and accuracy, no longer fashionable in today's art. His brushwork was very fine and it appears that every single twig and every leaf is given individual attention."

In 1884 he married Catherine Home Ramsay Ross of Larne, Northern Ireland, and he painted a number of Irish scenes. They had four children, the first in 1886, and the figures in his landscape watercolours are usually his family. At first living in Shepherd's Bush, London, in 1887 they moved to Hemingford Abbots in the Fens, then in 1889 to nearby Houghton, Cambridgeshire. There are rather fewer examples of his paintings on the market as he died young, at the age of 35, having fallen through the ice while skating on the River Ouse, the subject of so many of the family's paintings. There was initially something of a scandal, as his body was not found for two months. He was buried with his father in a secluded spot in the graveyard of St. James's Church, Hemingford Grey.

== Arthur Anderson Fraser ==
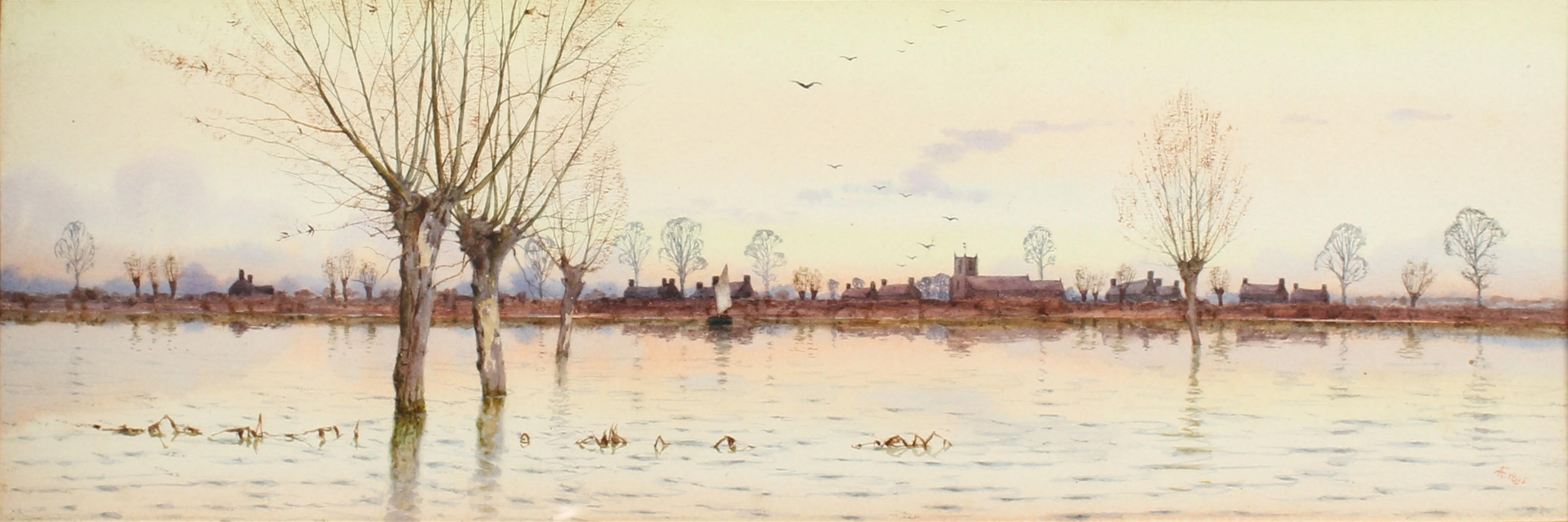
Arthur Anderson Fraser (1861-1904) A Fenland Landscape, 1895, 7 x 19 in.

Besides following his older brothers into the uncertain life of an artist, Arthur Anderson Fraser (1861–1904) was also an enthusiastic participant in the Neo-Jacobite Revival, founding a "White Cockade" club at the Ferry Boat Inn at Holywell. He married Margaret Lawson in 1885 and the couple had two sons, the elder of whom, Francis McGreigor, may also have dabbled in painting. As an artist, Arthur Anderson was particularly successful in capturing the distinctive morning and evening skies of the Huntingdonshire and Cambridgeshire landscape. His work is either signed by name or by the use of a small monogram joining the letters A and F, or by initials with a two digit date, e.g. " AAF 92". Even more than the rest of the family, he often used wide formats, up to four times as wide as they are high, and water takes up much of the scene.

== Gilbert Baird Fraser ==
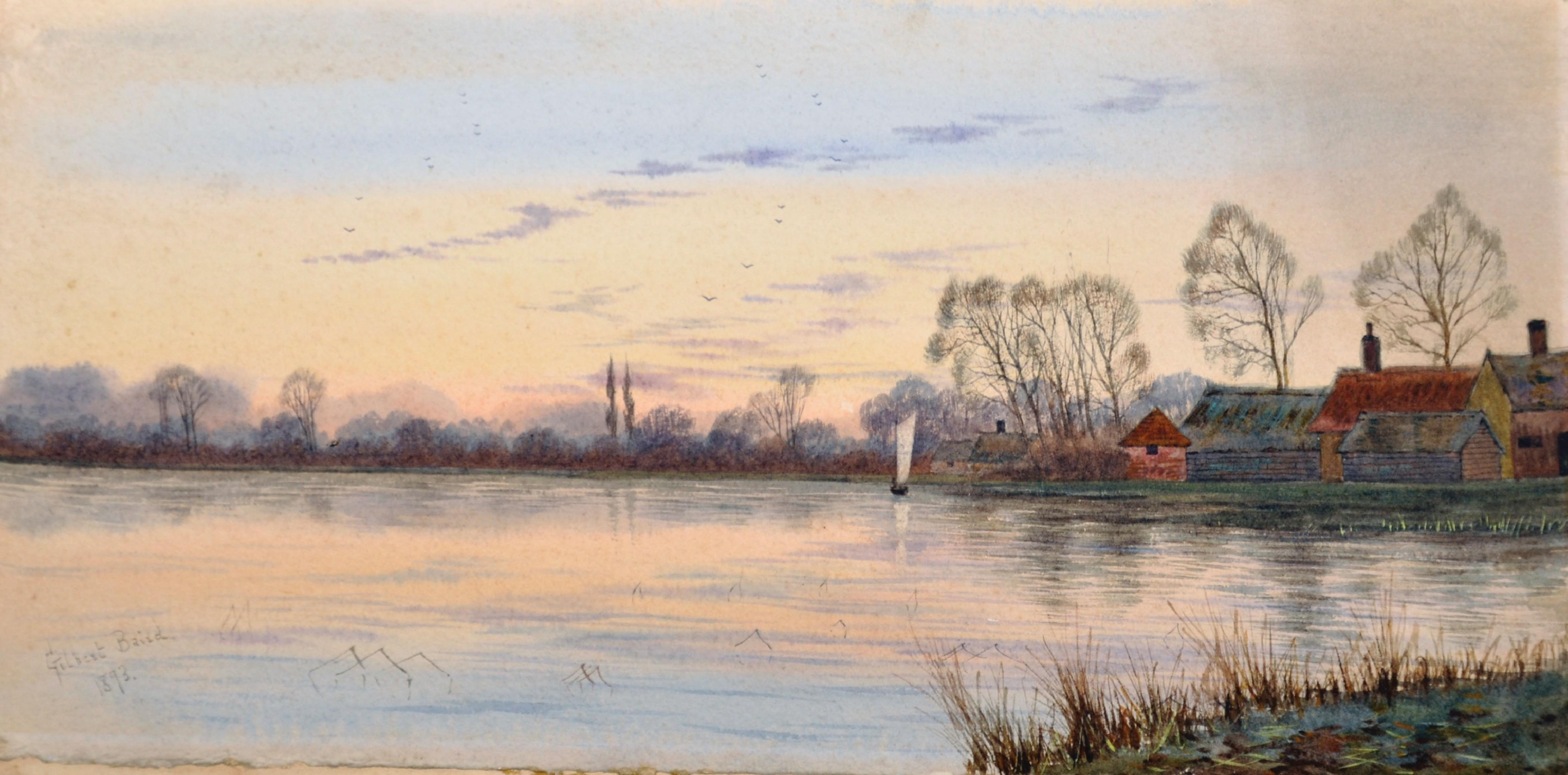
Gilbert Baird Fraser (1865–1947), 1893, 7.5 x 15.5 in.

Gilbert Baird Fraser (1865–1947) was the youngest and longest surviving member of the artistic family, outliving all his brothers and Robert Winchester’s sons. Like Arthur, he was involved with the Neo-Jacobites, standing for Parliament on a Jacobite platform in 1891. He lived with his wife May Heseltine at Reed Cottage in Holywell, Cambridgeshire, creating a considerable body of work, much of it with a somewhat warmer palette of colour than other family members. He is buried beside his brother Arthur Anderson and nephew Robert James Winchester in the churchyard at Holywell.

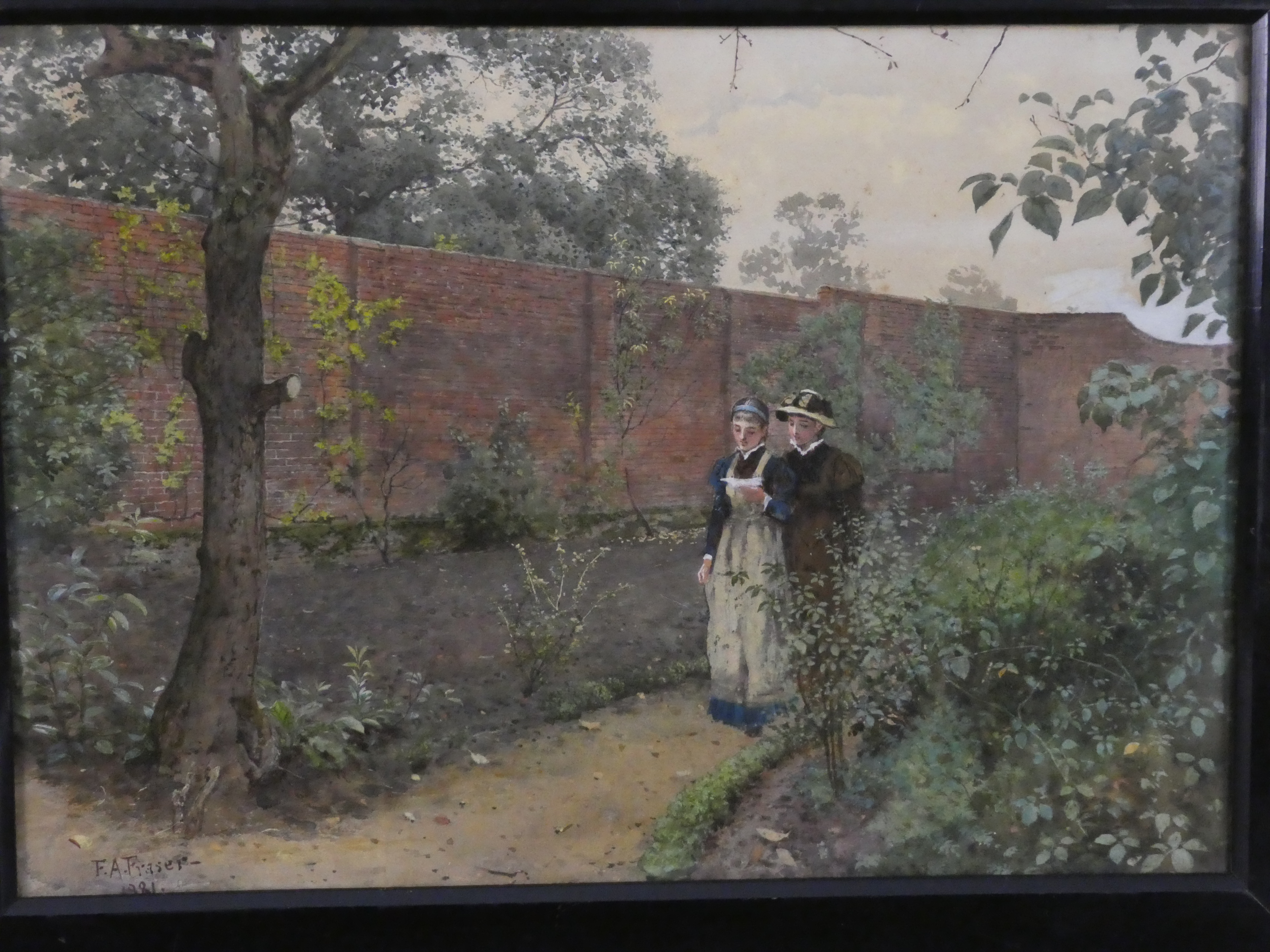
Watercolour by Francis Arthur Fraser, 1888

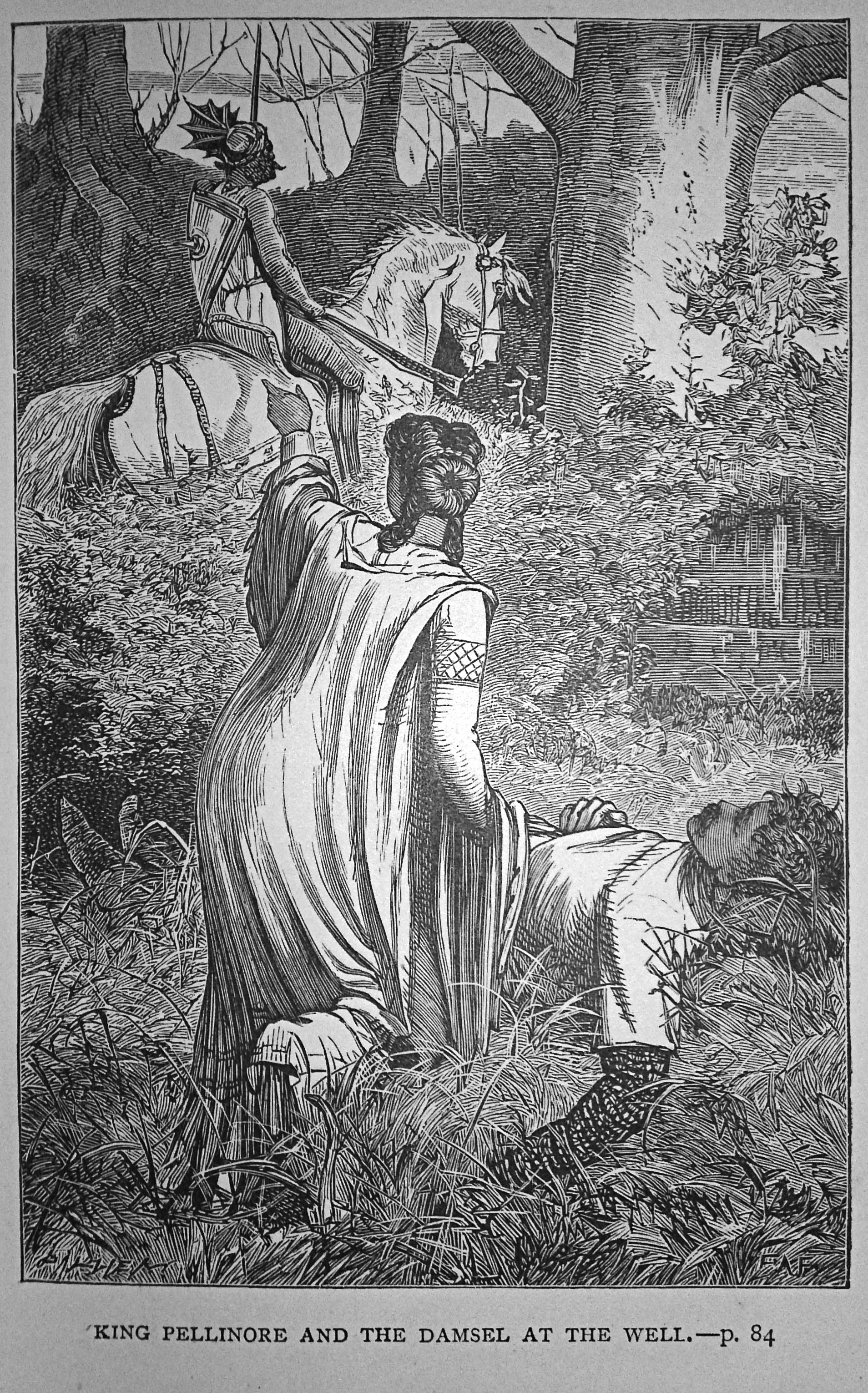
Illustration by Francis Arthur Fraser, 1846–1924, from King Arthur & His Knights of the Round Table by Henry Frith, 1884

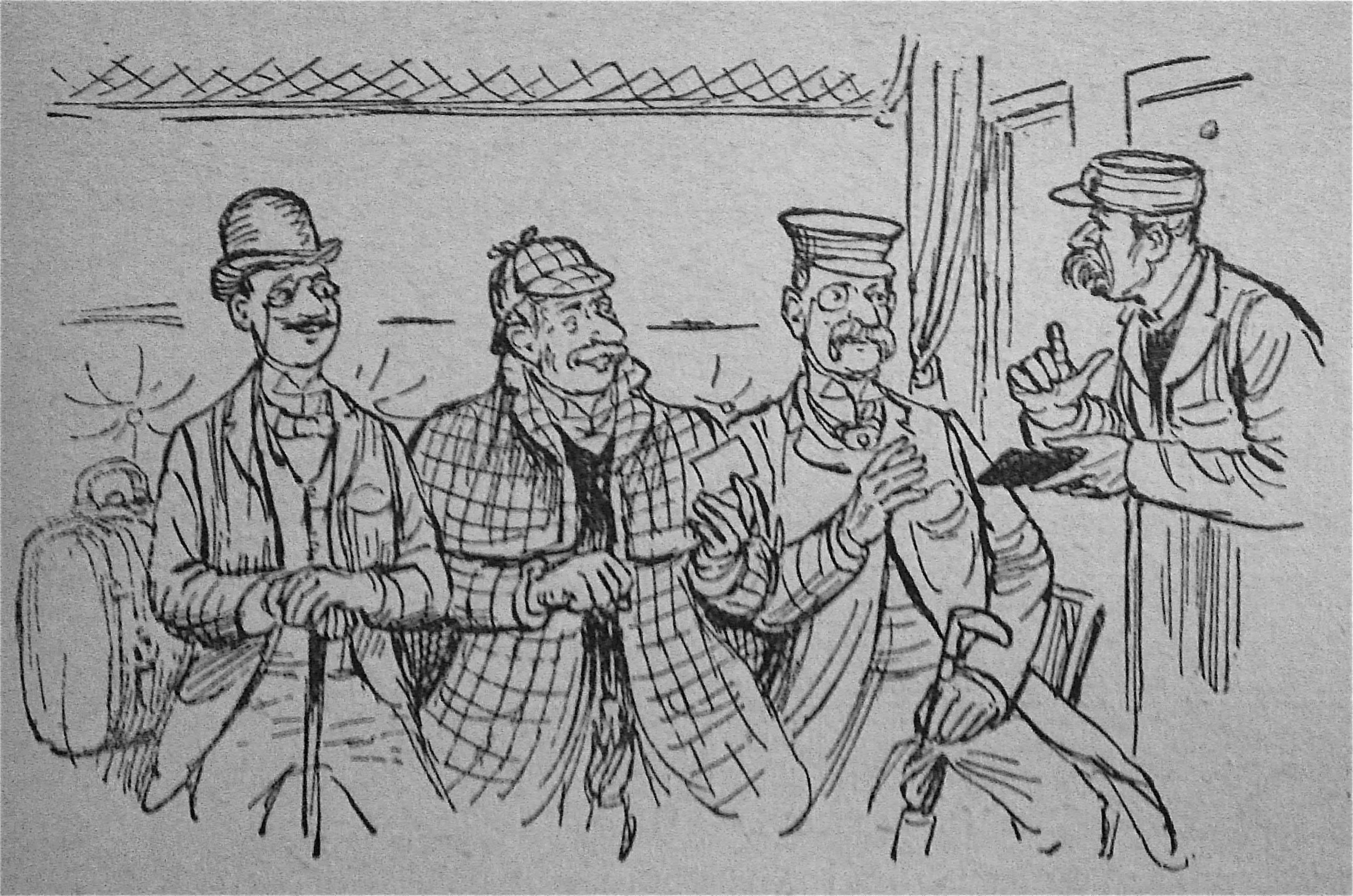
Illustration by George Gordon Fraser, 1859–1895, from The Diary of a Pilgrimage, 1891

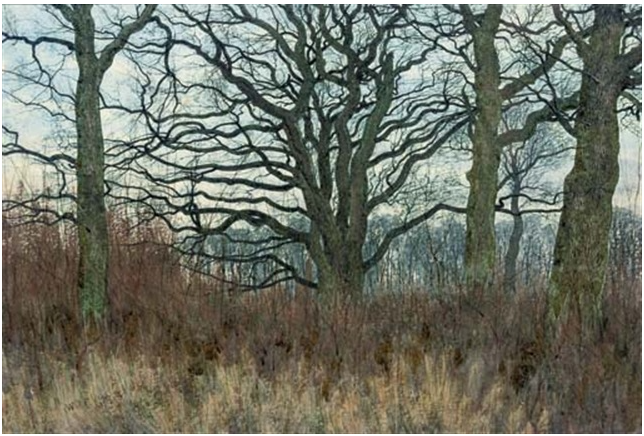
Garden William Fraser, A wood in winter, 1885

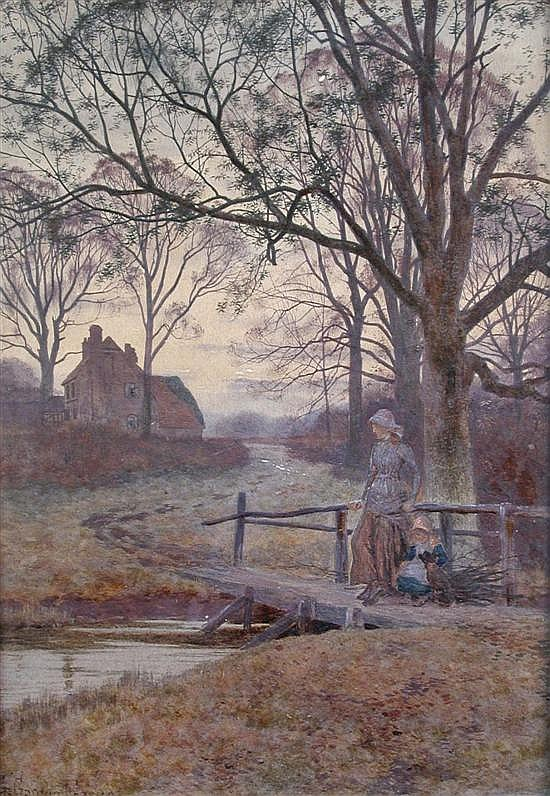
George Gordon Fraser, Mother and Child with Dog

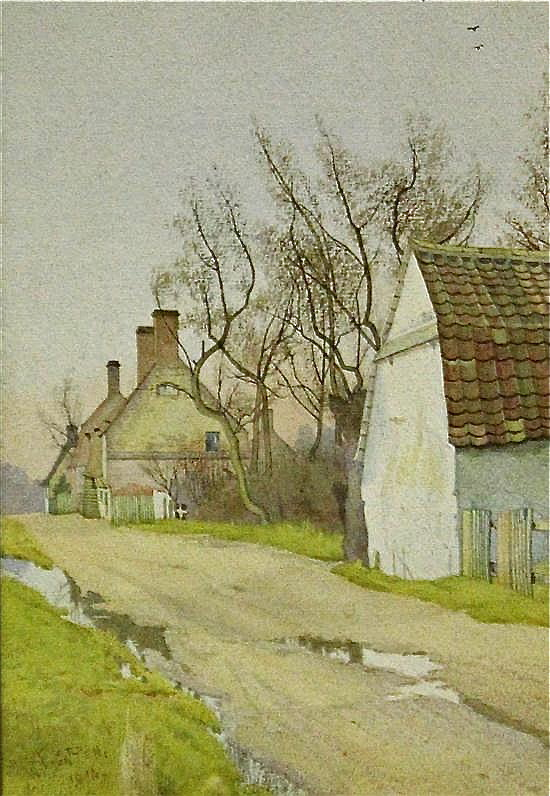
Watercolour by W. F. Garden (Garden William Fraser) 1856–1921

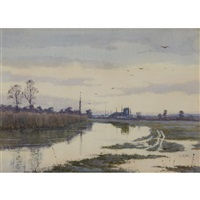
Arthur Anderson Fraser, Cookham-on-Thames
