= Hemmingford =

Hemmingford or Hemingford can refer to the following:

- Hemingford Abbots: a village formerly in Huntingdonshire - now Cambridgeshire, England
- Hemingford Grey: a village in Cambridgeshire, England
- Hemingford, Nebraska, USA
- Hemmingford, Quebec (township), Canada
- Hemmingford, Quebec (village), Canada
