= Vellacott =

Vellacott is a surname. Notable people with the surname include:

- Elisabeth Vellacott (1905–2002), English painter
- Maurice Vellacott (born 1955), Canadian politician
- Paul Cairn Vellacott (1891–1954), English schoolteacher and academic
- Philip Vellacott (1907–1997), English classical scholar
