= The River at Green Knowe =

1959 novel by Lucy M. Boston

- First UK edition
- Author: Lucy M. Boston
- Illustrator: Peter Boston
- Publisher: Faber & Faber

The River at Green Knowe is a 1959 children's novel written by Lucy M. Boston and illustrated by Peter Boston. It is part of the Green Knowe series, and is the third published in the sequence.

== Plot ==
Mrs. Oldknow and Tolly do not appear in The River at Green Knowe. It is summertime and Green Knowe has been let to two women, the archaeologist Doctor Maud Biggin and her friend, Miss Sybilla Bun. Doctor Biggin has invited her great-niece Ida and two "displaced" refugee children, Oskar and Ping, to stay with them at Green Knowe.

The children arrive and begin to explore the river and canals round Green Knowe by canoe. Unlike the previous two books, this book centres on the river which flows past the manor, and adjacent islands. The children's adventures here are based in their current time, though strongly fantasy-based; they meet a bus driver who's retreated from modern money-based society, see flying horses, meet a giant, and witness a Bronze Age moon ceremony. The subtext, of homeless children being protected and healed by the house and its enchantments, is particularly strong.

== Characters ==
- Ping - The quietest of the children.
- Ida - the leader of the children
- Oskar - oldest of the children
- Terak - the friendly giant
