= Hemingford Grey Meadow =

Protected area in Cambridgeshire, England

Coordinates: 52.305829°N 0.106954°W

- Site of Special Scientific Interest
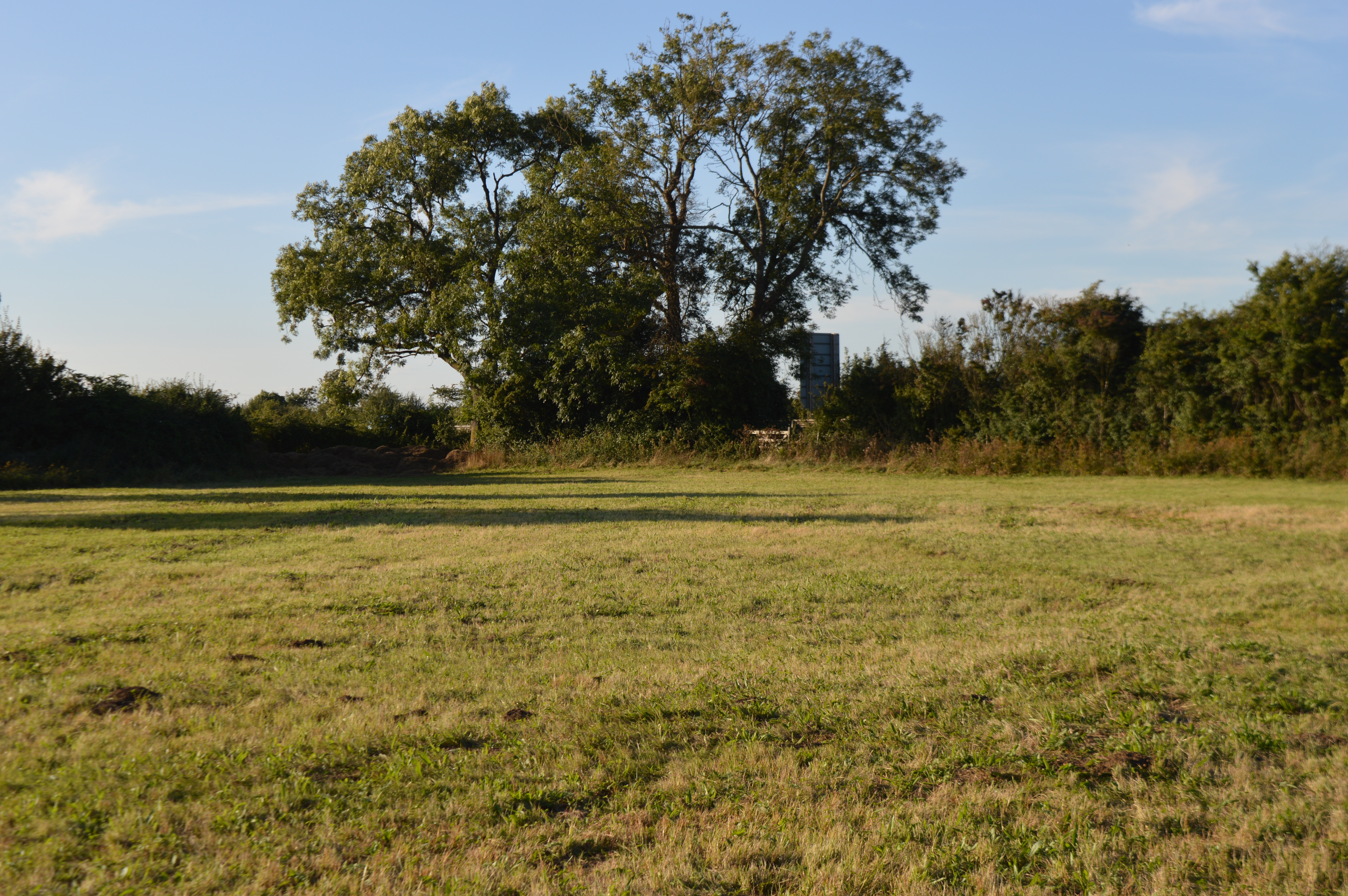
- Location of Hemingford Grey Meadow.
- Area of search: Cambridgeshire
- Grid reference: TL 291 692
- Interest: Biological
- Area: 0.7 hectares
- Notification date: 1984
- Location map: Magic Map

Hemingford Grey Meadow is a 0.7-hectare (1.7-acre) biological Site of Special Scientific Interest south of Hemingford Grey in Cambridgeshire. It is managed by the Wildlife Trust for Bedfordshire, Cambridgeshire and Northamptonshire as Arthur's Meadow.

The site is calcareous clay pasture with a wide variety of plant species, including the herbs oxeye daisy and yellow rattle. There are orchids such as common twayblades and common spotteds.

There is access to the site from Grove Lane, off the eastbound lane of the dual carriageway A14 road.
