= Alec Christie =

British actor

Alec Christie is a British actor. He started acting at the age of ten, appearing on stage at the Birmingham Repertory Theatre as young Herbert Pocket in Great Expectations. At the age of twelve, he was cast as Tolly in the BBC adaptation of Lucy M. Boston's The Children of Green Knowe. He went on to appear alongside Richard Griffiths, Frances de la Tour and Tim Healy in the situation comedy A Kind of Living.

After graduating with a BA Hons in Film and Literature from the University of Warwick, Christie embarked on a career in film, television and theatre, beginning with the film East is East, then on the Edinburgh Fringe First award-winning play BBA and Proud, written and directed by BAFTA Award winners Manoj and Maria Raithatha, which went on to tour England.

After the tour, he wrote and acted in the situation comedy pilot The Secret Life of a Nebbish for TAPS.

After working in the production arm of film financiers Screen Partners for two years, Christie returned to Edinburgh as company stage manager on the Herald Angel award-winning musical comedy Strictly Dandia for Tamasha Theatre Company.

He went on to work as a production manager on Pat Kelman's début feature Encounters.

The following year, Christie worked with Superman producer Ilya Salkind on Young Alexander, shot on location in Egypt and Greece.

He later worked as line producer on the comedy feature Back in Business, shot at Pinewood Studios and Twickenham Studios. The film was directed by Chris Munro and starred Martin Kemp, Chris Barrie, Brian Blessed, Dennis Waterman, Joanna Taylor, Stefan Booth and Togo Igawa. Coincidentally, Christie was at both the National Youth Theatre and the University of Warwick with Dennis Waterman's daughter Hannah Waterman.

In 2005, he produced the pilot episode of the sitcom No Skillz through his company Kayak Productions, starring Stephen Merchant (The Office, Extras), Karen Taylor (The Sketch Show), Tony MacMurray (The Office, Last Chancers) and Nicola Cotter (The Office).

In 2007, he directed two short films for filmaka.com, Ginger and SMS Kiss, and the educational DVD Simply Pain.

Most recently, he was commissioned by filmaka.com to write, produce and act in Christie, a comedy series for the internet.

He went on to write the comedy short Blackroom Management and the short films American Dream and Elephant Boy.
