= St Margaret's Church, Hemingford Abbots =

Coordinates: 52.3237°N 0.1193°W

St Margaret's Church, in Hemingford Abbots is a Church of England church, dedicated to Saint Margaret of Antioch. A church has stood on the site since at least 1086, for it is mentioned in the Domesday Record. Parts of the current fabric date from c. 1300.

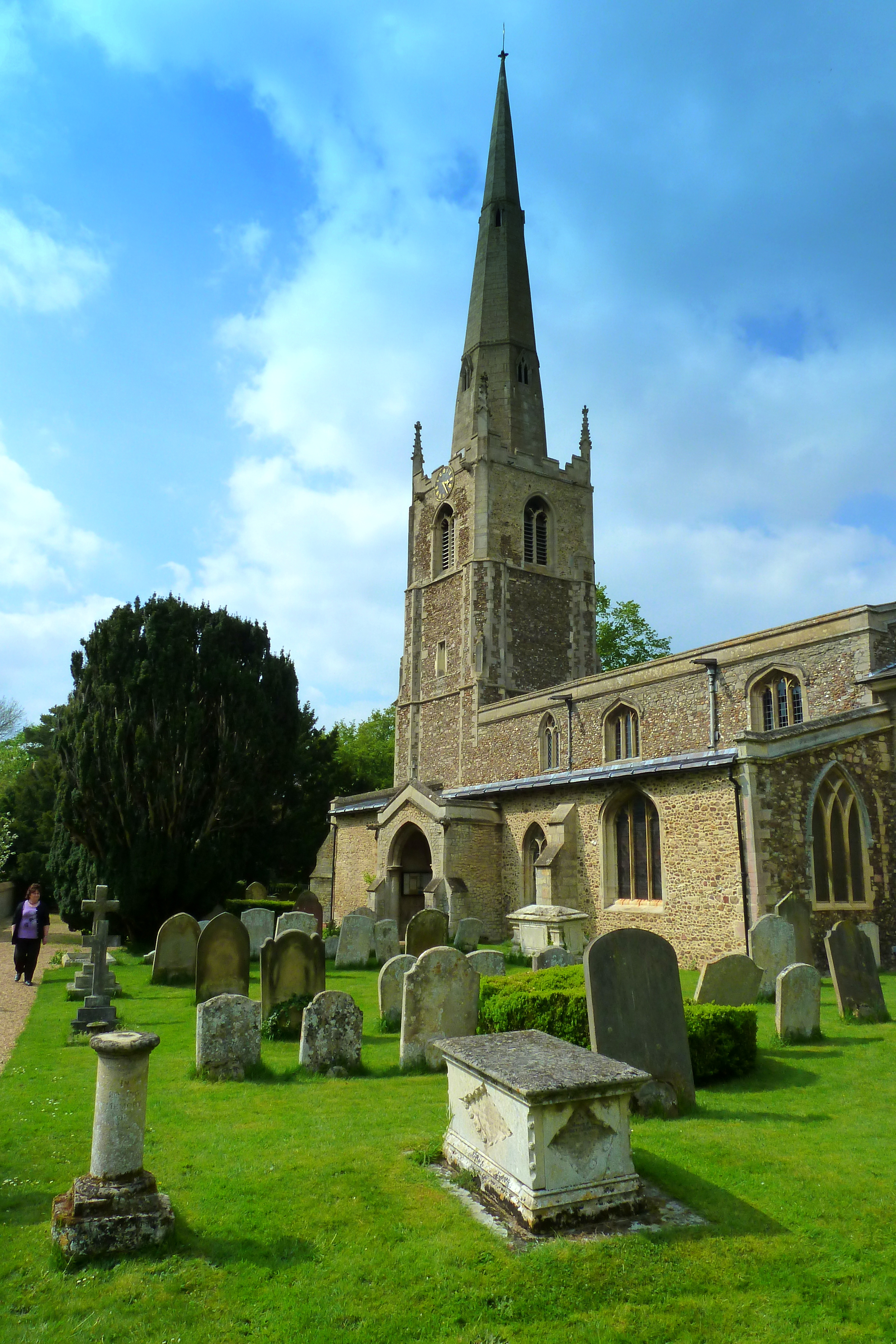
St Margaret's Church

== Nave ==
The nave's arches were built around 1300, the thicker pillars next to the chancel show where a twelfth century central tower stood. The remains of the flying buttresses which supported the tower can also be seen.

The oaken roof dates from around the fifteenth century. There are twenty-two angels in the architecture.

Signs of an earlier, lower, roof are evident, and the outlines of the earlier clerestory windows can also be seen.

The font is some seven hundred years old, with low relief Norman arches.

== Glass ==
Most of the stained glass is Victorian, but there is eighteenth century heraldic glass in the north aisle, also some mediaeval fragments. In the tower arch, there is a glass screen designed by David Peace, which was added to with a Dove engraving by Sally Scott in memorial to Peace.

== Tower and spire ==
The tower is adorned with gargoyles, though there are none on the less visible north side.

The spire is octagonal, and has castellated band courses, two rows of lucarnes, and is topped with a weathervane. The first ten feet (3.0 m) of the spire is at a steeper angle than the rest.

== Churchyard ==
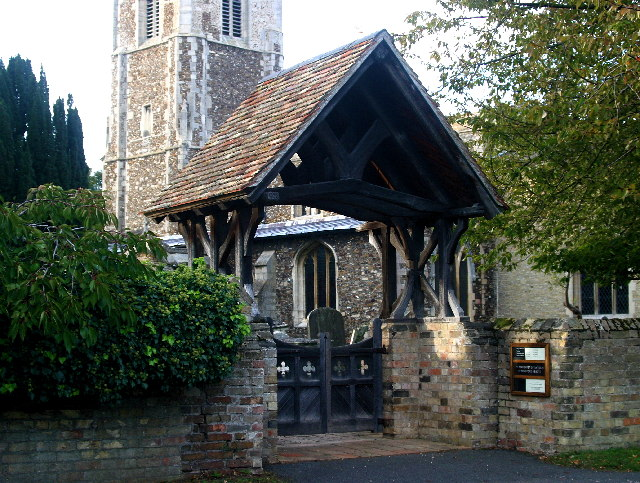
The lychgate

The churchyard contains many traditional headstones in the vernacular material, two table tombs, and has a goodly population of box trees and yews. Access is via a lychgate which was moved from Warboys to mark the Hemingford Millennium in 1974.
