= From Time to Time (film) =

Julian Fellowes' 2009 British children's film

- Official poster
- Directed by: Julian Fellowes
- Written by: Julian Fellowes
- Based on: The Chimneys of Green Knowe by Lucy M. Boston
- Starring: Maggie Smith; Timothy Spall; Carice van Houten; Alex Etel; Eliza Bennett; Hugh Bonneville
- Cinematography: Alan Almond
- Edited by: John Wilson
- Music by: Ilan Eshkeri
- Production company: Ealing Studios
- Distributed by: Fragile Films
- Release dates: 15 October 2009 (BFI London); 24 September 2010 (United Kingdom)
- Running time: 92 minutes
- Country: United Kingdom
- Language: English
- Box office: $159,640

From Time to Time is a 2009 British fantasy drama film directed by Julian Fellowes starring Maggie Smith, Timothy Spall, Carice van Houten, Alex Etel, Eliza Bennett, Elisabeth Dermot-Walsh, Dominic West, Hugh Bonneville, and Pauline Collins. It was adapted from Lucy M. Boston's children's novel The Chimneys of Green Knowe (1958). The film was shot in Athelhampton Hall, Dorset.

== Plot ==
Near the end of World War II, teenager Toseland (known as Tolly) gets picked up at the railway station by Mr. Boggis. When Mr. Boggis starts to make mention of the boy's soldier father David, Tolly quickly points out he has only been reported missing in action and not confirmed dead.

Tolly has taken the train from Manchester to spend Christmas at his grandmother's large country estate in Cambridgeshire, Green Knowe. Tolly's mother has gone to London awaiting more information about David. His grandmother, Mrs. Oldknow, disapproved of her son's marriage and once, out of anger, wrote a meanly worded letter viewing his wife as a commoner. She regrets having written the letter, as she admits she does not know her well.

Mrs. Oldknow tells Tolly she is strapped, so is faced with possibly selling Green Knowe. He is adamant she does not sell. She tells him about Mariah van Raymer, Thomas Oldknow's wife, who had almost brought them to ruin in the 1800s with her gambling and extravagant spending.

On Tolly's first night at Green Knowe, his grandmother tells Tolly about their ancestors. They are descended from Thomas and Mariah's eldest, a boy, Seftan. In the evening he sees and hears a ghostly young girl. His grandmother confirms it must have been Susan, the blind daughter of Lord Thomas Oldknow.

The next day, as he is climbing a tree, he hears a girl and an adolescent boy giggling and finds an old spur hidden in a hollow. His grandmother recognises it as belonging to Seftan. Butler John Caxton, wary of the African boy Jacob that Captain Oldknow brought home as a companion, as he had stowed away on his ship to avoid being sold at auction.

Soon after, Tolly discovers that he magically time travels between the present and the early 19th century in the old manor house. Certain people in that time can see and communicate with him, while he remains invisible to others.

Susan can speak to Tolly both in her time and his. He learns that his grandmother also sees the ancestral ghosts. Susan leads him on an adventure that unlocks family secrets buried for generations. One exciting event includes a terrible fire, during which Jacob saves Susan, and Mr. Caxton takes off with the family jewels during the fire. It also includes Seftan threatening to sell Fred to be sold into a press gang. Thomas fires Mr. Caxton because of this and tells Seftan he is ashamed of him.

The lost treasure is eventually found by Tolly, with the help of Susan. She also confirms it was John Caxton who was responsible for the fire. It was more likely that he perished in the fire. So, Green Knowe is saved, but Tolly's father is a casualty of the war. Mrs. Oldknow finally welcomes Tolly's mother into the family. Tolly is told that Susan then Jacob both died of a childhood disease. Tolly is comforted when his father's ghost appears, assuring him everything will be alright.

== Cast ==
- Maggie Smith as Mrs. Oldknow
- Timothy Spall as Boggis
- Carice van Houten as Maria Oldknow
- Alex Etel as Tolly
- Pauline Collins as Mrs. Tweedie
- Harriet Walter as Lady Gresham
- Eliza Hope Bennett as Susan
- Kwayedza Kureya as Jacob
- Douglas Booth as Sefton Oldknow
- Hugh Bonneville as Captain Oldknow
- Dominic West as John Caxton
- Allen Leech as Fred Boggis

== Reception ==
On the review aggregator website Rotten Tomatoes, 43% of 7 critics' reviews are positive, with an average rating of 5.9/10. Tom Huddleston of Time Out described the film as "an emotionally wise but logically skewed children's tale", the logical inconsistencies of which "largely restricts the film's appeal to bookish pre-teens". Henry Fitzherbert of the Daily Express praised the actors' performances, particularly Smith's, and noted that it "casts a magical spell by the touching conclusion".
