= David Peace (glass engraver) =

British glass engraver and town planner (1915–2003)

David Brian Peace
- Born: 13 March 1915
- Died: 15 February 2003 (aged 87)
- Occupations: Engraver; Town planner
- Known for: Glass Engraving

David Peace MBE FSA FGE (13 March 1915 – 15 February 2003) was a British glass engraver and town planner. Peace, along with William Wilson and Laurence Whistler are accredited as simultaneously reviving the craft of glass engraving during the 1930s. Several pieces of his work are situated in Westminster Abbey including an engraved glass screen at St George's Chapel.

== Early years ==
Peace was born to Herbert W. F. Peace and Mabel Peace (née Hammond) in Sheffield. His father was a Sheffield file maker. While at Mill Hill School, his teacher Clarence White introduced him to wood engraving. Peace sent one of his more accomplished pieces to Eric Gill, the sculptor and typeface designer, and received a postcard of commendation in return. Upon leaving school he attended the Sheffield School of Architecture, but did not pass his final exams owing to him not developing his own style. After leaving university, he worked as an assistant architect for several practices before World War II broke out. During the war he worked for the RAF, helping to construct new airfields.

== Glass engraving ==
Peace started experimenting with glass engraving, a long forgotten art form, during the 1930s by providing gifts to his family and friends. In the early 1950s he moved his hobby on by buying an elderly £11 foot-operated dentist drill, after trying a diamond drill he had borrowed from his dentist. His first commissioned work came from an advertisement in The Times requesting suggestions for a golden wedding present, to which he engraved a goblet in italic with the motto, "With the ever- circling years comes round the age of gold". Peace would go onto collect a large repertory of sayings, mottos and poetic fragments to use in his works. His first window engraving commission came in 1953, located at a house in Nottingham. His commissions gradually increased as screens and draught lobbies were introduced at churches, as well as goblets, bowls and decanters. A bowl engraved by Peace is used by the Society of Antiquaries of London for counting votes cast at ballots.

During the 1960s he started to display at exhibitions providing illustrated catalogues of his work. His first one man exhibition came in 1972 at the Kettle's Yard Gallery in Cambridge, to which the gallery's creator Jim Ede said

The beauty of the glass itself is seldom obstructed by his markings, but instead vibrates and glitters

The Kettle's Yard still hold six permanent pieces of Peace's work in their collection. His work was acknowledge when in 1973 he was made the Master of the Art Workers' Guild and then again in 1975, when he was made the first chairman of the Guild of Glass Engravers, an organisation he help found. It was in 1975 that his first work, a memorial stone for the poet Gerard Manley Hopkins was unveiled at Westminster Abbey. He would later go onto design the inscription for his friend Sir John Betjeman's memorial at the Abbey. The Victoria & Albert Museum have 33 pieces of Peace's work in their collections.

After retiring from Cambridgeshire County Council in 1979, Peace spent time writing his book Glass Engraving: lettering and design, which was launched in 1985. In 1986, Peace started a partnership with artist Sally Scott. Peace and Scott went onto design the eight panels on the western porch of Westminster Abbey, and a further 25 commissions. These included engraved glass screens at St Botolph's Aldgate and the Church of St Peter, Great Berkhamsted. Laurence Whistler said of Peace's work with Scott,

Sally gave his work wings

In 1990, Peace designed a set of glass doors for the Nave at Westminster Abbey. In 1990, he produced the book The Engraved Glass of David Peace, The Architecture of Lettering.

== Town planning career ==
After the war he joined Staffordshire County Council in 1948 as a town planner, where he stayed until 1961. In 1961 he joined Cambridgeshire County Council as Deputy County Planning Officer, even though family friend John Betjeman provided a reference stating

Mr Peace is often called Charles in honour of the famous 19th-century murderer

It was a role he held until 1975 when he was promoted to Divisional Leader of Environmental Planning, a role he retained until his retirement in 1980. While at Cambridgeshire County Council he was instrumental in important planning decisions to protect medieval buildings, including preserving Magdalene Bridge, ensuring that RAF Duxford airfield became a museum site rather than a prison and preventing high-rise development in Cambridge. In 1973 he authored the book A guide to historical buildings law. He received the MBE in 1977 for his work in town and environmental planning, and was awarded an honorary doctorate in 1991 by the University of Sheffield. In 1979, Peace authored the Council for British Archaeology occasional paper "Historic buildings and planning policies" .

== Personal life and other hobbies ==
Peace married Jean Lawson, a Royal Academy trained artist, in 1939 and had two daughters. Jean died in 1989. In addition to his love of glass engraving, Peace also created architectural maps of Staffordshire, the Peak District and North Wales, taking his family on his trips. Jean, with help from family friend John Betjeman, turned her journal's of these trips into Sweet Vernal. Peace would also go onto contribute to Betjeman's book Collins' Guide to the Parish Churches of England on the chapter of Staffordshire.

In 1994, Peace worked with Eric Gill 's family to produce Eric Gill, the inscriptions: a descriptive catalogue.

== Death and memorial ==
Peace died on the 15 February 2003.

Sally Scott, Peace's design partner for 14 years added a dove to the glass partition that Peace designed at St Margaret's Church, Hemingford Abbots in memorial to Peace.

The Guild of Glass Engravers named an award, the David Peace Prize, for students based in the UK and overseas producing glasswork in memorial to Peace.
