= Holywell, Cambridgeshire =

Village in Cambridgeshire, England

Coordinates: 52.319°N 0.034°W

Holywell

- Location within Cambridgeshire
- Population: 2,517 (Including Needingworth. 2011)
- OS grid reference: TL340709
- Civil parish: Holywell-cum-Needingworth
- District: Huntingdonshire
- Shire county: Cambridgeshire
- Region: East
- Country: England
- Sovereign state: United Kingdom
- Post town: St Ives
- Postcode district: PE27
- Police: Cambridgeshire
- Fire: Cambridgeshire
- Ambulance: East of England
- UK Parliament: North West Cambridgeshire

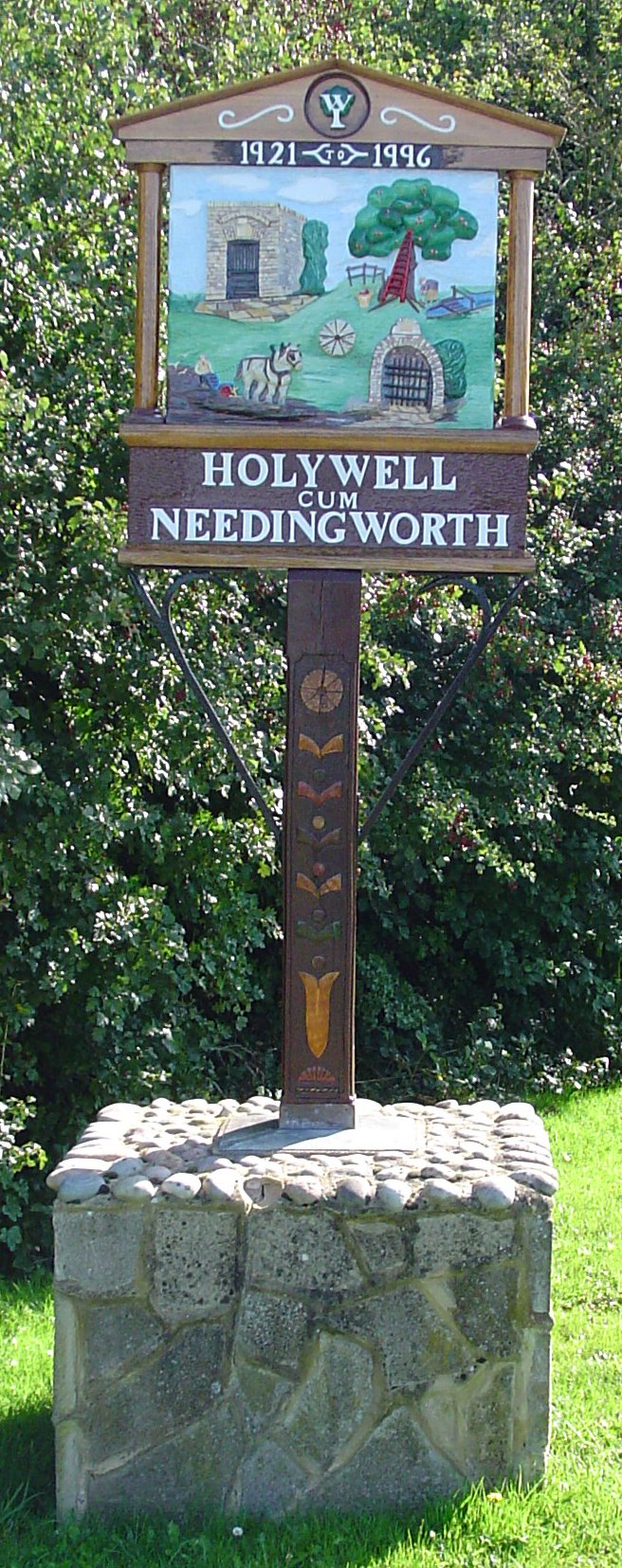
Signpost in Holywell cum Needingworth

Holywell is a village in Cambridgeshire, England, approximately 6 miles (10 km) east of Huntingdon, in the civil parish of Holywell-cum-Needingworth. It is situated within Huntingdonshire, a non-metropolitan district of Cambridgeshire, and is a historic county of England.

== History ==
Holywell is a Saxon ring village, one of only three in Cambridgeshire. It is served by a small road from Needingworth and is a dead end to motor traffic. There are approximately 80 houses, the oldest dating to the 16th century; a parish church; and a public house.

== Government ==
Holywell is part of the civil parish of Holywell-cum-Needingworth, which has a parish council elected by residents who have registered on the electoral roll. The parish council, the lowest tier of government in England, is responsible for providing and maintaining local services including allotments, a cemetery, and landscaping and tree planting in public spaces such as village greens and playing fields. It reviews all planning applications and makes recommendations to Huntingdonshire District Council, the parish's local planning authority. It also represents the parish's interests in issues such as local transport, policing and the environment. It raises its own tax, the parish precept, to pay for these services, which is collected as part of the Council Tax. The parish council's fourteen councillors, and parish clerk, normally meet once a month.

Holywell was in the historic and administrative county of Huntingdonshire until 1965, when the village became part of the new administrative county of Huntingdon and Peterborough. In 1974, following the Local Government Act 1972, it became a part of the county of Cambridgeshire.

The second tier of local government is Huntingdonshire District Council, a non-metropolitan district of Cambridgeshire with its headquarters in Huntingdon. It has 52 councillors representing 29 district wards. It collects the council tax, and provides services such as building regulations, local planning, environmental health, leisure and tourism. Holywell is a part of the district ward of Earith and is represented on the district council by two councillors. District councillors are elected to four-year terms.

For Holywell, the highest tier of local government is Cambridgeshire County Council, whose administration buildings are in Cambridge. The County Council provides county-wide services such as major road infrastructure, fire and rescue, education, social services, libraries and heritage services, and consists of 69 councillors representing 60 electoral divisions. Holywell is part of the electoral division of Somersham and Earith and is represented on the county council by one councillor.

At Westminster, Holywell is in the parliamentary constituency of North West Cambridgeshire, and elects one Member of Parliament (MP) by the first past the post system of election. Holywell is represented in the House of Commons by Sam Carling (Labour). Sam Carling has represented the constituency since 2024.

== Geography ==
The road at the southern aspect faces onto farmland and the River Great Ouse. The river levels are regulated by a system of locks and sluices, and after heavy rains the river is allowed to flood across the large area of meadows on Holywell Front to a depth of several feet, often covering the road. Access to the houses, which are all in an elevated position on a gravel bank running roughly east–west, is via a footpath or access track from the northern side of the village.

== Demography ==
=== Population ===
In the period 1801 to 1901 the population of Holywell-cum-Needingworth was recorded every ten years by the UK census. During this time the population was in the range of 623 (the lowest was in 1801) and 959 (the highest was in 1841).

From 1901, a census was taken every ten years with the exception of 1941 (due to the Second World War).

Parish	1911	1921	1931	1951	1961	1971	1981	1991	2001	2011
Holywell-cum-Needingworth	607	578	520	684	753	1398	2206	2421	2539	2517

All population census figures from report Historic Census figures Cambridgeshire to 2011 by Cambridgeshire Insight.

In 2011, the parish covered an area of 2,881 acres (1,166 hectares) and the population density of Holywell-cum-Needingworth in 2011 was 559.1 persons per square mile (215.9 per square kilometre).

== The legends ==
Legend has it that a young girl named Juliet committed suicide near the church in the time of Edward the Confessor. The story runs that she committed the act having been jilted in love by the local woodcutter, and was buried on the banks of the Ouse at the ferry crossing point in AD 1050. It is claimed the Old Ferry Boat Inn public house was built on top of her grave. A stone slab can be found within the pub, set into the floor on the south west side of the pub.

A seance was conducted in the 1950s, during which the participants claim to have contacted the spirit of the young girl. During questioning, she apparently identified herself as Juliet Tewsley and that the local woodcutter was named Thomas Zoul. However, no Norman records have been found to support this claim. During a second seance the following year, the date moved forward to the 15th century.

On the anniversary of her death, which is Saint Patrick's Day (17 March, according to tradition) her ghost is said to appear as a spectral figure slowly moving towards the river bank. Occasionally the apparition has been witnessed within the Ferry Boat Inn, but this may relate to the themed evening hosted inside, and the alcoholic drink promotions of the night. Juliet's gravestone is preserved within the pub, but to walk on it is to invite serious ill-luck and drinks must be bought for all and sundry within should a visitor do so. A number of paranormal groups investigate the inn every 17 March, but evidence is generally inconclusive.

== Religious sites ==
The holy water well from which the village takes its name is located in front of the church, as you exit the building with the River Great Ouse ahead of you. It has been refurbished and repaired many times over the years. The "well" is in fact a stone structure built over a natural spring which emerges at this point. There are several other natural springs, or chalybeates, along Holywell Front; water seeps out under the gravel bank where it meets the underlying clay. A well dressing ceremony takes place each year in June, and children from the local primary school are involved in making floral garlands and decorations for the well.

The existence of a church on the site dates back further than reliable records exist, but there is a register of church rectors dating back to AD 990. The living was in the gift of the Abbot of Ramsey, and there remains at the west end of the village evidence of mediaeval fishponds which were managed by monks from the Abbey. The current church building is mainly 14th century, with a fine 16th-century tower reputedly built with stone taken from Ramsey Abbey after the Dissolution.

== Landmarks ==
=== The Old Ferry Boat Inn ===
The Old Ferry Boat Inn (or Ye Olde Ferry Boat Inn) is one of the village's main attractions. It is a large public house with a restaurant, conference rooms and seven large bedrooms available to the public. Over the years it has grown from a small tavern for local labourers into the commercially profitable venue that it is now. The inn, and other buildings in and around Holywell, were the subject of paintings by the watercolour artist W. F. Garden (Garden William Fraser), who lived at the Old Ferry Boat from 1904 until his death in 1921. It has been owned by various families, breweries and private concerns and is seen as a jewel-in-the-crown to brewing outfits due its picture postcard looks and large visitor numbers. It is currently serviced by the Greene King chain.

The Ferry Boat Inn is one of scores of pubs in the UK to lay claim to being the country's oldest. Others include Ye Olde Trip to Jerusalem, Nottingham and Ye Olde Fighting Cocks, St Albans.
