= Green Knowe =

Series of children's books by Lucy M. Boston

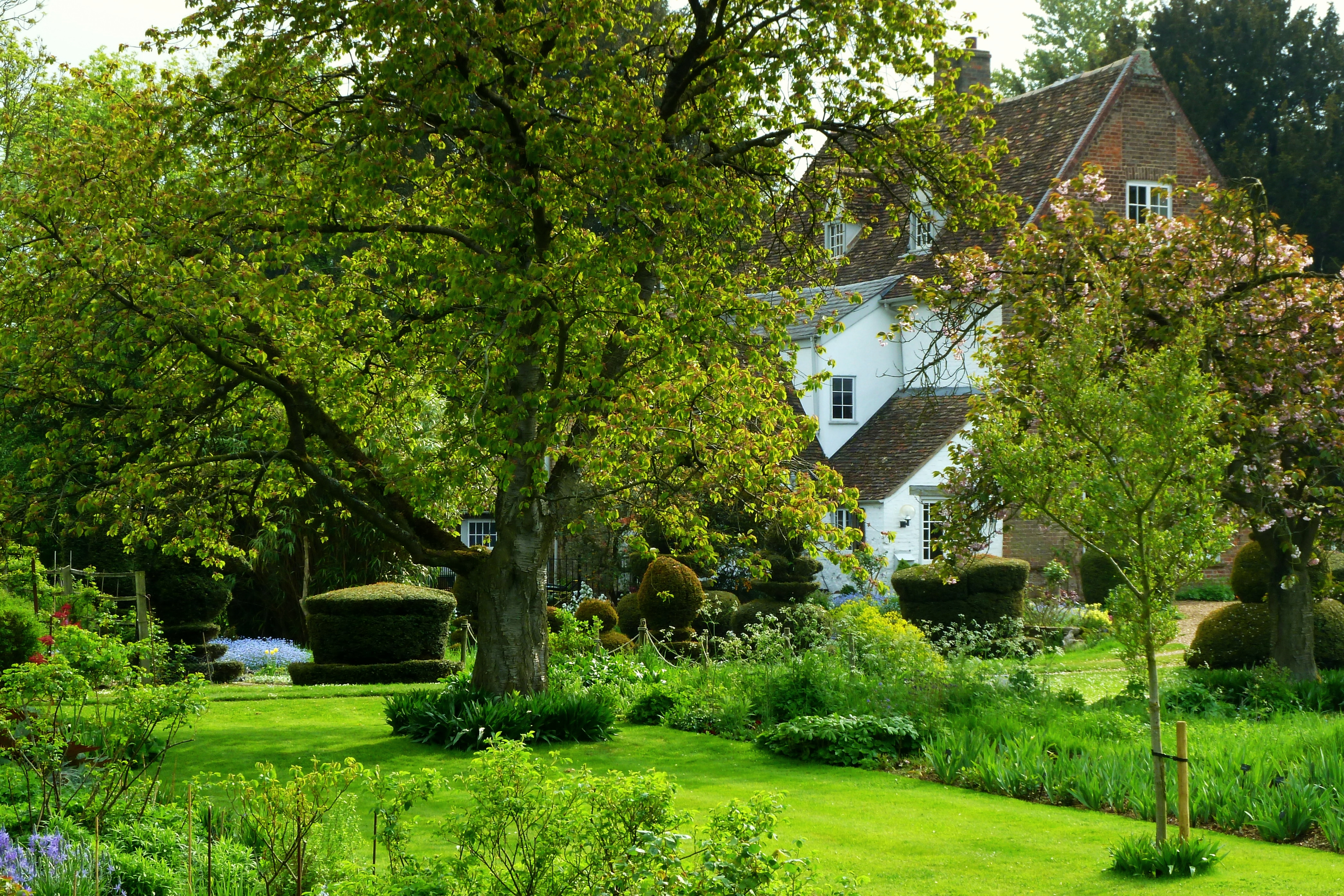
The Manor, Hemingford Grey, the 12th-century house on which Green Knowe was based

Green Knowe is a series of six children's novels written by Lucy M. Boston, illustrated by her son Peter Boston, and published from 1954 to 1976. It features a very old house, Green Knowe, based on Boston's home at the time, The Manor in Hemingford Grey, Huntingdonshire, England. In the novels she brings to life the people she imagines might have lived there.

For the fourth book in the series, A Stranger at Green Knowe (1961), Boston won the annual Carnegie Medal, recognising the year's best children's book by a British subject. She was a commended runner up for both the first and second books. (Note: Since 1995, the Carnegie shortlist has usually included eight books. According to CCSU, some runners up through 2002 were commended (from 1954) or highly commended (from 1966). There were about 160 commendations of both kinds in 49 years, including six each in 1954 and 1958.)

Some of the stories feature Tolly and his great-grandmother Mrs. Oldknow. Green Knowe is inhabited by the spirits of people who lived there in ages past, and more than one of the spirits Tolly knows as children later grow into adults. Other supernatural entities in the series include the children's dog, Orlando; a demonic tree-spirit, Green Noah (manifesting as a large tree on the grounds of the manor house); and an animated statue of St. Christopher.

The first five books were published in the UK by Faber and Faber, from 1954 to 1964, and in the US by Harcourt, the first in 1955, and the others within the calendar year of British publication. The last book appeared after more than a decade, published by The Bodley Head and Atheneum Books in 1976.

Lucy M. Boston also published an excerpt from An Enemy At Green Knowe as a short story, "Demon at Green Knowe" (1964), which was compiled in Spooks, Spooks, Spooks (1966).

WorldCat reports that the six Green Knowe novels are Boston's works most widely held by participating libraries, by a wide margin.

== Synopsis ==
=== The Children of Green Knowe (1954) ===
The Children of Green Knowe, the first of Boston's six books about the fictional manor house Green Knowe, was a commended runner-up for the 1954 Carnegie Medal. The novel concerns the visit of a young boy, Toseland, to the magical house Green Knowe. The house is tremendously old, dating from the Norman Conquest, and has been continually inhabited by Toseland's ancestors, the d'Aulneaux family, later called Oldknowe or Oldknow. Toseland crosses floodwaters by night to reach the house, to spend the Christmas holidays with his great-grandmother, Linnet Oldknow, who addresses him as "Tolly".

Over the course of the novel, Tolly explores the rich history of his family, which pervades the house like magic. He begins to encounter what appear to be the spirits of three of his forebears—an earlier Toseland (nicknamed Toby), Alexander, and an earlier Linnet—who lived in the reign of Charles II. These meetings are for the most part not frightening to Tolly; they continually reinforce his sense of belonging that the house engenders. In the evenings, Mrs. Oldknow (whom Tolly calls "Granny") entertains Tolly with stories about the house and those who lived there.

The BBC children's series "Jackanory" had actress Susannah York reading from the book with interspersed live action scenes featuring the children and animals; the five episodes were broadcast in the week ending 23 December 1966.

BBC One adapted the book in the television series The Children of Green Knowe (1986), starring Alec Christie as Tolly, Daphne Oxenford as Mrs. Oldknow, and Polly Maberly as Linnet Oldknow.

=== The Chimneys of Green Knowe (1958) ===
The Chimneys of Green Knowe was a commended runner up for the 1958 Carnegie Medal. In the United States it was published within the calendar year by Harcourt, as Treasure of Green Knowe.

The Chimneys also features Tolly, who has returned to Green Knowe for the Easter holidays. As she mends a patchwork quilt, Mrs. Oldknow continues telling Tolly stories about the previous inhabitants of the house. This time, her stories concern Susan Oldknow, a blind girl who lived at Green Knowe during the English Regency, and the close bond of friendship that developed between her and a young black page, Jacob, brought back from the West Indies by Susan's father, Captain Oldknowe. The plot also concerns the whereabouts of Maria Oldknowe's jewels, which may or may not have been stolen by the unscrupulous butler Caxton.

The Chimneys was adapted for film as From Time to Time (2009), with Maggie Smith as Mrs. Oldknow, Hugh Bonneville as Captain Oldknowe, and Alex Etel as Tolly.

=== The River at Green Knowe (1959) ===
Mrs. Oldknow and Tolly do not appear in The River at Green Knowe. It is summertime, and the house has been rented by two old ladies: the archaeologist Doctor Biggin and her friend Miss Bun. Doctor Biggin has invited her niece Ida and two "displaced" refugee children, Oskar and Ping, to stay with her at Green Knowe.

The children arrive and begin to explore the river and canals round Green Knowe by canoe. The magic of Green Knowe is much more fantasy-based in this novel: the children see flying horses, meet a giant, and witness a Bronze Age moon ceremony. The subtext, of homeless children being protected and healed by the house and its enchantments, is particularly strong.

=== A Stranger at Green Knowe (1961) ===
The Chinese boy Ping has returned to Green Knowe alone to stay with Mrs. Oldknow. During a visit to a zoo in London before his arrival at Green Knowe, he is fascinated by the giant gorilla Hanno; as a refugee, Ping feels a powerful bond. After Hanno escapes from the zoo and makes his way to Green Knowe, Ping befriends him. The early chapters of the book detail Hanno's life as a young gorilla in Africa, and the trauma and cruelty of his capture, with great compassion and finesse. A Stranger at Green Knowe was awarded the 1961 Carnegie Medal.

=== An Enemy at Green Knowe (1964) ===
This novel takes a darker turn than previous novels in the series. Both Tolly and Ping are staying at Green Knowe. Mrs. Oldknow tells them the story of Doctor Vogel, a tutor and necromancer who came to a diabolical end at Green Knowe centuries before. The next day, Professor Melanie D. Powers appears, hunting for Vogel's occult papers. Professor Powers' interest is far from academic, however, and a mounting confrontation between the holy magic of Green Knowe and the forces of Evil, represented by Melanie Powers, commences.

=== The Stones of Green Knowe (1976) ===
This novel, the last in the sequence, tells the story of Roger d'Aulneaux, the son of the original Norman settler who built the manor house of Green Knowe. Whilst exploring the overgrown countryside, Roger discovers two throne-like stones that allow him to access the turbulent time of the Conquest, then the later periods of Linnet, Susan, and Tolly, and them to visit him in turn.

== Reception ==
In 1956, Anthony Boucher praised the first novel as "sheer literary magic: subtle, tenuous, enchanting and wholly convincing."

In a study of "series fiction" at the turn of the century, Victor Watson opined that "A Stranger at Green Knowe is a masterpiece ... and in my opinion the greatest animal story in English children's literature". Generally, he praised Boston for "her ability 'to find exactly the right words, to groom her prose to glossy perfection'".

== Adaptations ==
- John Stadelman adapted Boston's first novel, The Children of Green Knowe, into an eponymous television drama serial comprising four episodes. It was broadcast on BBC One between 26 November and 17 December 1986. The Children Of Green Knowe had a second run in 1998, again on the BBC.
- Filming locations for the BBC adaptation include Crows Hall in Suffolk and Peterborough Cathedral. The railway sequence was filmed at Nene Valley Railway. The school at the beginning of the first episode was filmed at Brandeston Hall, Framlingham College prep school. The Midnight Mass, Church scenes were filmed at Gedding Church in Suffolk.
- The 1986 BBC adaptation stars, Alec Christie as Tolly, Polly Maberly as Linnet, Daphne Oxenford as Granny Oldknowe, George Malpas as Boggis, Graham McGrath as Toby and James Trevelyan as Alexander.
- Brian Sibley dramatised an eponymous radio play adaptation of The Children of Green Knowe, directed by Marilyn Imrie, which aired on BBC Radio 4 on 18 December 1999.
- Julian Fellowes wrote and directed a film adaptation of The Chimneys of Green Knowe, titled From Time to Time (2009).
- Listen & Live Audio, Inc. has published the unabridged audiobook recordings for each of the six novels, narrated by voiceover artist Simon Vance.

== See also ==
The Children Of Green Knowe Appreciation Society on Facebook

== Notes ==
Awards
Preceded by The Making of Man	A Stranger at Green Knowe; Carnegie Medal recipient 1961	Succeeded by The Twelve and the Genii
