= The Old Ferry Boat Inn =

Pub in Holywell, Cambridgeshire, England

- Interactive map of The Old Ferry Boat Inn

Restaurant information
- Established: 560 AD
- Location: Huntingdonshire
- Coordinates: 52.3172°N 0.0318°W

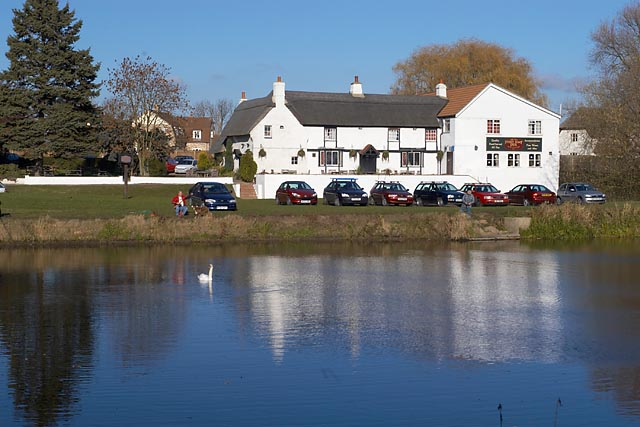

The Old Ferry Boat Inn is a pub in Holywell, Huntingdonshire, Cambridgeshire, England. It is situated on the banks of the River Great Ouse.

The pub claims to have been established in AD 560 and to be the oldest pub in England. It is Grade II listed, being a seventeenth-century building with an earlier cross-wing.

== Alleged haunting ==
The Old Ferry Boat Inn is believed to house a ghost named Juliet Tewsley. She is rumoured to rise every year on the anniversary of her death. Tewsley was a local girl who fell in love with Tom Zaul in the 11th century. Tom was not in love with Juliet in return, so she hanged herself on 17 March 1050.

There is a stone slab inside the pub dedicated to Tewsley. Staff reportedly avoid walking over the grave, as it is believed to cause frightening apparitions. Guests are also advised not to do so.
