= The Manor (Cambridgeshire) =

House in Cambridgeshire, England

Coordinates: 52.3191°N 0.109°W

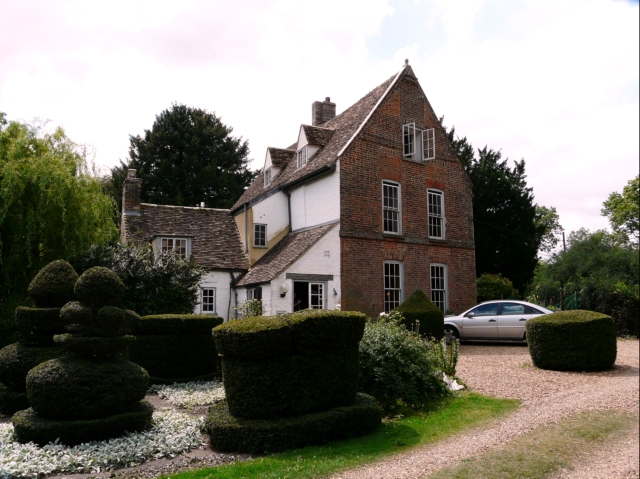
The Manor House at Hemingford Grey

The Manor is a house in the village of Hemingford Grey, Cambridgeshire. It was built around 1160, or may have been built as early as the 1130s and is one of the oldest continuously inhabited houses in Britain — sometimes claimed by some to be the oldest, although this is disputed, with the officially recognised oldest continually occupied house in Britain being in Saltford. Much of the original house remains intact despite various changes over nine centuries.

During the early 18th century, the manor was home to the "Beautiful Miss Gunning", sisters Maria and Elizabeth Gunning, who had a reputation of being among the most beautiful women in Europe. William Cowper, the poet, on observing them whilst walking his dog by the river described them as "two nymphs adorned with every grace". Maria later married the Earl of Coventry. Elizabeth was married twice, firstly to the Duke of Hamilton and secondly to the Duke of Argyll. She had two sons with each and became the mother of four Dukes.

From the late 19th century the house was rented for many years by the watercolour painter Robert Winchester Fraser (1848–1906), of the Fraser family of artists, several of whom painted the house and gardens.

The house was made famous by its long-term resident, Lucy M. Boston, who bought it in 1939 and rechristened it as Green Knowe and wrote several books set there. Apart from the fictional St Christopher on the side of the house, almost everything in the books can be found at The Manor. During the Second World War, she gave gramophone recitals for nearby airmen. The house remains much as Boston left it on her death in 1990, and is open for visitors by appointment. The gardens, Lucy Boston's creation, are bordered by a moat and have topiary, old roses, award-winning irises and herbaceous borders.
