= Philip Vellacott =

English classical scholar (1907–1997)

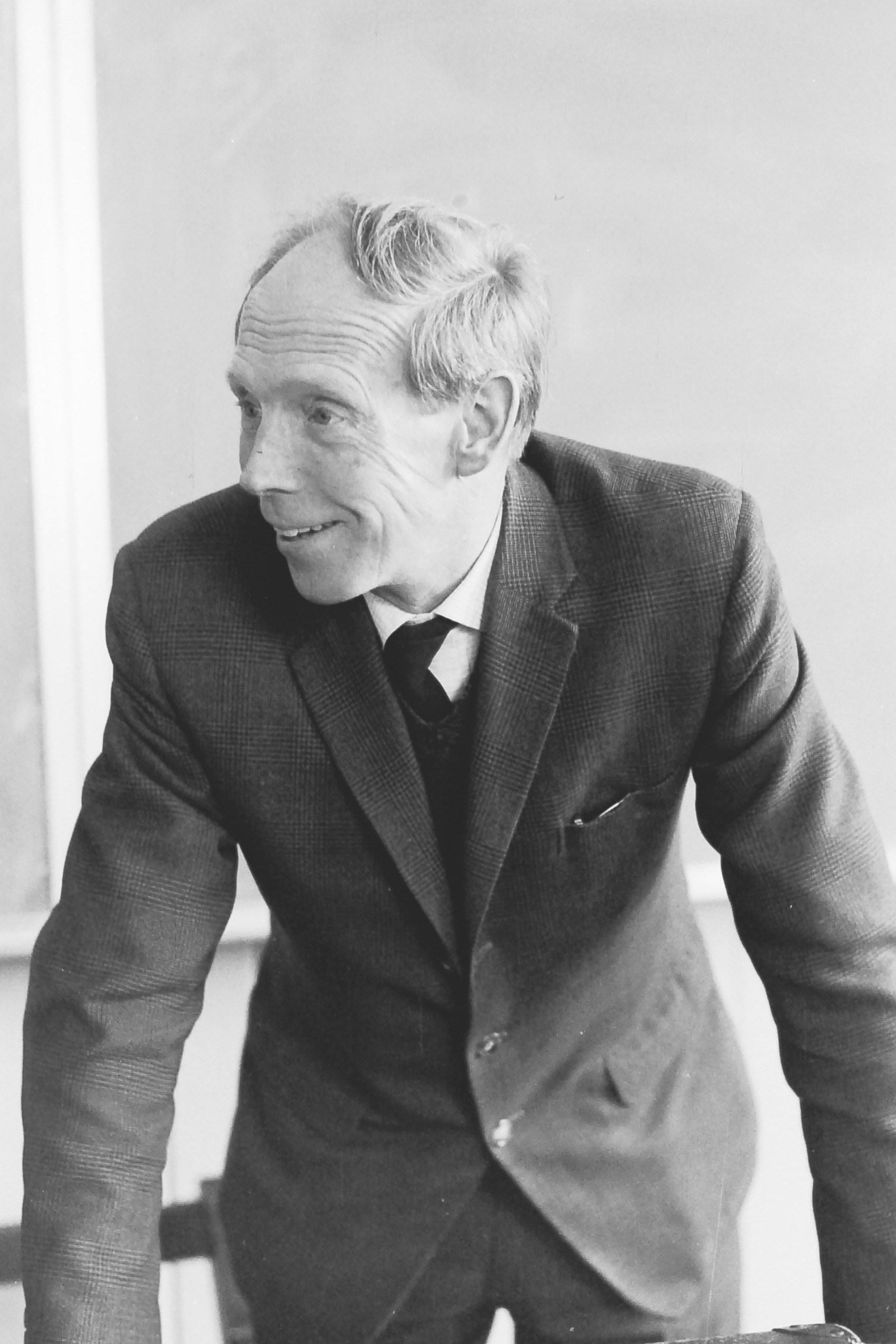
Philip Vellacott

Philip Humphrey Vellacott (16 January 1907 – 24 August 1997) was an English classical scholar, known for his numerous translations of Greek tragedy.

He was born at Grays, Essex and educated at St Paul's School, London and Magdalene College, Cambridge, where he was awarded a double first in the Classics Tripos.

During the 1930s, Vellacott taught at Liverpool University, and schools including Dulwich College, London. He carried on teaching through the Second World War, as he was a conscientious objector. It was during his time as a teacher that he completed most of his Penguin Books classical translations centred on the works of Aeschylus, Euripides and Theophrastus.

Vellacott lectured on Greek drama on four tours in the US and spent time as a visiting lecturer at the University of California, Santa Cruz. He retired in 1967 to Radnorshire, where he carried on writing until his death in 1997.

In 1939 he married Nancy Agnew. The artist Elisabeth Vellacott was his sister.

== Works, other than translations ==
- Ordinary Latin (1962)
- Writing in Latin: Style and Idiom for Advanced Latin Prose (1970), with D. P. Simpson
- Sophocles and Oedipus: a Study of Oedipus Tyrannus with a New Translation (1971)
- Ironic drama: a Study of Euripides' method and meaning (1975)
- The Logic of Tragedy: Morals and Integrity in Aeschylus' Oresteia (1984)
- An English reader's guide to Sophocles' Oedipus Tyrannus and Oedipus Coloneus (1993)

== Translations ==
- Aeschylus: The Oresteian Trilogy (Agamemnon, The Choephori, The Eumenides) (1956)
- Aeschylus: Prometheus Bound and other plays (Prometheus Bound, The Suppliants, Seven Against Thebes, The Persians) (1961)
- Euripides: Alcestis and other plays (Hippolytus, Iphigenia in Tauris, Alcestis) (1953) (republished as Three Plays (1972))
- Euripides: The Bacchae and other plays (Ion, The Women of Troy, Helen, The Bacchae) (1954)
- Euripides: Medea and other plays (Medea, Hecabe, Electra, Heracles) (1963)
- Euripides: Orestes and other plays (The Children of Heracles, Andromache, The Suppliant Women, The Phoenician Women, Orestes, Iphigenia in Aulis) (1972)
- Theophrastus: The Characters, and Menander: Plays and Fragments (1967)
