= Hemingford Abbots =

Village in Cambridgeshire, England

Coordinates: 52.316°N 0.1°W

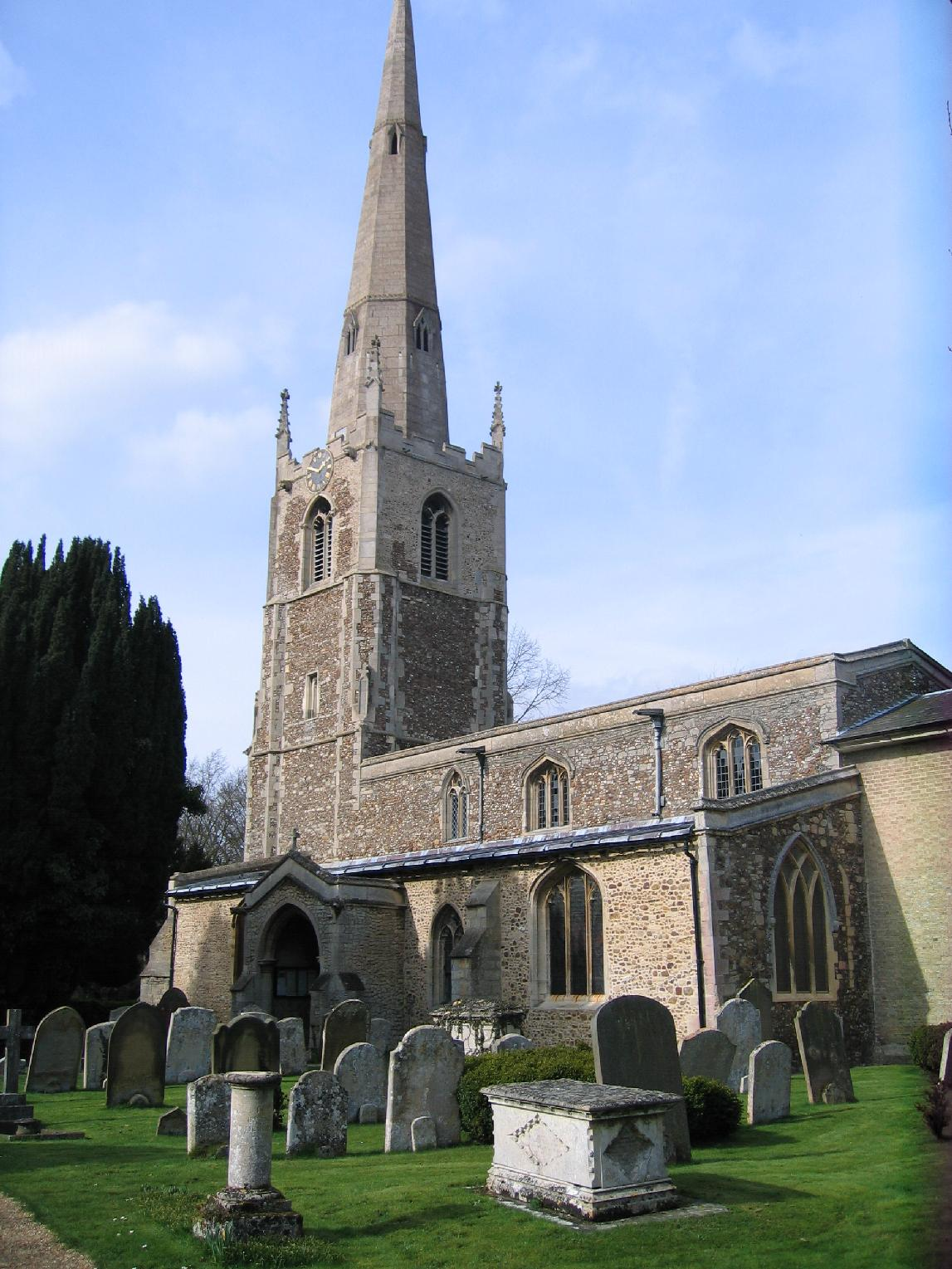
- St Margaret's church

- Location within Cambridgeshire
- Population: 635 (2011)
- OS grid reference: TL2970
- Shire county: Cambridgeshire
- Region: East
- Country: England
- Sovereign state: United Kingdom
- Post town: Huntingdon
- Postcode district: PE28
- Dialling code: 01480
- Police: Cambridgeshire
- Fire: Cambridgeshire
- Ambulance: East of England
- UK Parliament: Huntingdon

Hemingford Abbots is a village and civil parish in Cambridgeshire, England. Hemingford Abbots lies approximately 3 miles (5 km) east of Huntingdon, and is almost continuous with neighbouring Hemingford Grey. Hemingford Abbots is situated within Huntingdonshire which is a non-metropolitan district of Cambridgeshire as well as being a historic county of England.

== History ==
There has been a settlement on the present site since at least Roman times with both flints and a Roman sarcophagus found in the area. In Anglo-Saxon times the neighbouring villages of Hemingford Grey and Hemingford Abbots were a single estate. In the 9th century they split, and in 974 the manor fell under the ownership of Ramsey Abbey, where it remained until the dissolution in 1539.

Hemingford Abbots was listed in the Domesday Book in the Hundred of Toseland in Huntingdonshire; the name of the settlement was written as Emingeforde in the Domesday Book. In 1086 there were three manors at Hemingford Abbots; the annual rent paid to the lords of the manors in 1066 had been £11.50 and the rent had fallen to £10.15 in 1086.

The Domesday Book does not explicitly detail the population of a place but it records that there were 32 households at Hemingford Abbots. There is no consensus about the average size of a household at that time; estimates range from 3.5 to 5.0 people per household. Using these figures then an estimate of the population of Hemingford Abbots in 1086 is that it was within the range of 112 and 160 people.

The Domesday Book uses a number of units of measure for areas of land that are now unfamiliar terms, such as hides and ploughlands. In different parts of the country, these were terms for the area of land that a team of eight oxen could plough in a single season and are equivalent to 120 acres (49 hectares); this was the amount of land that was considered to be sufficient to support a single family. By 1086, the hide had become a unit of tax assessment rather than an actual land area; a hide was the amount of land that could be assessed as £1 for tax purposes. The survey records that there were ten ploughlands at Hemingford Abbots in 1086 and that there was the capacity for a further eight ploughlands. In addition to the arable land, there was 80 acres (32 hectares) of meadows and a water mill at Hemingford Abbots.

The tax assessment in the Domesday Book was known as geld or danegeld and was a type of land-tax based on the hide or ploughland. It was originally a way of collecting a tribute to pay off the Danes when they attacked England, and was only levied when necessary. Following the Norman Conquest, the geld was used to raise money for the King and to pay for continental wars; by 1130, the geld was being collected annually. Having determined the value of a manor's land and other assets, a tax of so many shillings and pence per pound of value would be levied on the land holder. While this was typically two shillings in the pound the amount did vary; for example, in 1084 it was as high as six shillings in the pound. For the manors at Hemingford Abbots the total tax assessed was 20 geld.

By 1086 there was already a church and a priest at Hemingford Abbots.

In 1250 the village was listed as having 96 holdings, but numbers fell following the Black Death. The population grew from 306 in 1801 to 564 in 1841, but dropped as many moved to towns and cities. It grew rapidly after the Second World War, reaching a peak of 628 in 1961. Its 2001 population was 584.

The name Hemingford means "the ford of the people of Hemma", where Hemma is believed to be the name of a Saxon chief. The name "Abbots" was added in reference to its ownership by Ramsey Abbey. The village was known as Hemmingeford Magna, Emmingeforde Abbatis in the 13th century.

The village is home to a number of medieval buildings; Abbots End, the Manor House, Whiteways, Medlands, Abbots Barn, the White Cottage and Rideaway Cottage were all built prior to 1600.

== Government ==
As a civil parish, Hemingford Abbots has a parish council. The parish council is elected by the residents of the parish who have registered on the electoral roll; the parish council is the lowest tier of government in England. A parish council is responsible for providing and maintaining a variety of local services including allotments and a cemetery; grass cutting and tree planting within public open spaces such as a village green or playing fields. The parish council reviews all planning applications that might affect the parish and makes recommendations to Huntingdonshire District Council, which is the local planning authority for the parish. The parish council also represents the views of the parish on issues such as local transport, policing and the environment. The parish council raises its own tax to pay for these services, known as the parish precept, which is collected as part of the Council Tax. The parish council consists of seven councillors and normally meets on the last Wednesday of the month (except in August and December).

Hemingford Abbots was in the historic and administrative county of Huntingdonshire until 1965. From 1965, the village was part of the new administrative county of Huntingdon and Peterborough. Then in 1974, following the Local Government Act 1972, Hemingford Abbots became a part of the county of Cambridgeshire.

The second tier of local government is Huntingdonshire District Council which is a non-metropolitan district of Cambridgeshire and has its headquarters in Huntingdon. Huntingdonshire District Council has 52 councillors representing 29 district wards. Huntingdonshire District Council collects the council tax, and provides services such as building regulations, local planning, environmental health, leisure and tourism. Hemingford Abbots is a part of the district ward of The Hemingfords and is represented on the district council by two councillors. District councillors serve for four-year terms following elections to Huntingdonshire District Council.

For Hemingford Abbots the highest tier of local government is Cambridgeshire County Council which has administration buildings in Cambridge. The county council provides county-wide services such as major road infrastructure, fire and rescue, education, social services, libraries and heritage services. Cambridgeshire County Council consists of 69 councillors representing 60 electoral divisions. Hemingford Abbots is part of the electoral division of The Hemingfords and Fen Stanton and is represented on the county council by one councillor.

At Westminster Hemingford Abbots is in the parliamentary constituency of Huntingdon, and elects one Member of Parliament (MP) by the first past the post system of election. Huntingdon is represented in the House of Commons by Jonathan Djanogly (Conservative). Jonathan Djanogly has represented the constituency since 2001. The previous member of parliament was John Major (Conservative) who represented the constituency between 1983 and 2001.

== Demography ==
=== Population ===
In the period 1801 to 1901 the population of Hemingford Abbots was recorded every ten years by the UK census. During this time the population was in the range of 306 (the lowest was in 1801) and 564 (the highest was in 1841).

From 1901, a census was taken every ten years with the exception of 1941 (due to the Second World War).

Parish	1911	1921	1931	1951	1961	1971	1981	1991	2001	2011
Hemingford Abbots	364	372	296	348	628	578	590	601	583	635

All population census figures from report Historic Census figures Cambridgeshire to 2011 by Cambridgeshire Insight.

In 2011, the parish covered an area of 2,417 acres (978 hectares) and so the population density for Hemingford Abbots in 2011 was 168.1 persons per square mile (64.9 per square kilometre).

== Culture and community ==
The village has one public house, The Axe and Compass, situated in a thatched 15th-century house.

== Religious sites ==
A church is listed in the Domesday entry of 1086, although nothing remains of the building. The church was completely rebuilt at the end of the thirteenth century, the tower was added in the late fourteenth century and the spire in the fifteenth century. The present church of St Margaret's, Hemingford Abbots is largely a result of the reconstruction in the eighteenth and nineteenth centuries.

The church was originally named "St Margaret Church of the Virgin" and is now dedicated to Saint Margaret of Antioch.
