= Hemingford Grey =

Village in Cambridgeshire, England

Coordinates: 52.318°N 0.104°W

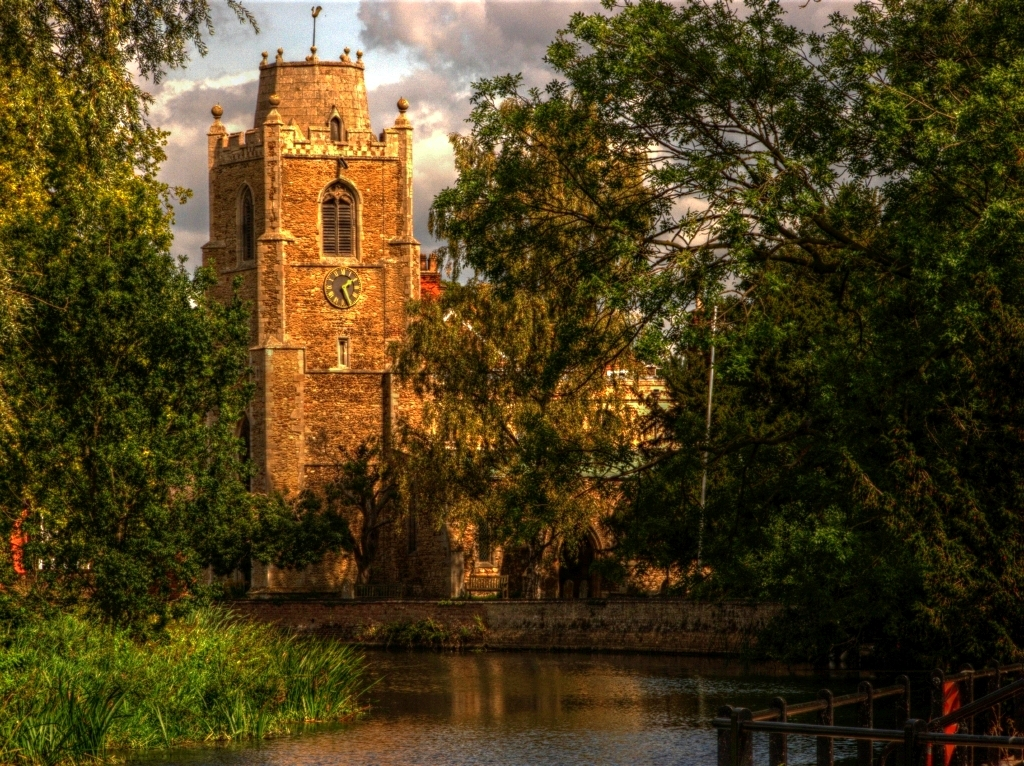
- St James' Parish Church, Hemingford Grey

- Location within Cambridgeshire
- Population: 2,524; 2,532 (2011 Census)
- OS grid reference: TL293706
- District: Huntingdonshire
- Shire county: Cambridgeshire
- Region: East
- Country: England
- Sovereign state: United Kingdom
- Post town: Huntingdon
- Postcode district: PE28
- Dialling code: 01480
- Police: Cambridgeshire
- Fire: Cambridgeshire
- Ambulance: East of England
- UK Parliament: Huntingdon

Hemingford Grey is a village and civil parish in Cambridgeshire, England. Hemingford Grey lies approximately 4 miles (6 km) east of Huntingdon. Hemingford Grey is situated within Huntingdonshire which is a non-metropolitan district of Cambridgeshire as well as being a historic county of England.

== History ==
In Anglo-Saxon times the neighbouring villages of Hemingford Grey and Hemingford Abbots were a single estate. In the ninth century they were split into two. In 1066 "Little Hemingford", as it was known, was acquired by nearby Ramsey Abbey.

Hemingford Grey was listed in the Domesday Book of 1086 in the Hundred of Toseland in Huntingdonshire; the name of the settlement was written as alia Emingeforde and Emingeforde in the Domesday Book. In 1086 there were three manors at Hemingford Grey; the annual rent paid to the lords of the manors in 1066 had been £17 and the rent had fallen to £16 in 1086.

The Domesday Book does not explicitly detail the population of a place but it records that there were 29 households at Hemingford Grey. There is no consensus about the average size of a household at that time; estimates range from 3.5 to 5.0 people per household. Using these figures then an estimate of the population of Hemingford Grey in 1086 is that it was within the range of 101 and 145 people.

The Domesday Book uses a number of units of measure for areas of land that are now unfamiliar terms, such as hides and ploughlands. In different parts of the country, these were terms for the area of land that a team of eight oxen could plough in a single season and are equivalent to 120 acres (49 hectares); this was the amount of land that was considered to be sufficient to support a single family. By 1086, the hide had become a unit of tax assessment rather than an actual land area; a hide was the amount of land that could be assessed as £1 for tax purposes. The survey records that there were 12.25 ploughlands at Hemingford Grey in 1086 and that there was the capacity for a further 2.75 ploughlands. In addition to the arable land, there was 90 acres (36 hectares) of meadows, two water mills and a fishery at Hemingford Grey.

The tax assessment in the Domesday Book was known as geld or danegeld and was a type of land-tax based on the hide or ploughland. It was originally a way of collecting a tribute to pay off the Danes when they attacked England, and was only levied when necessary. Following the Norman Conquest, the geld was used to raise money for the King and to pay for continental wars; by 1130, the geld was being collected annually. Having determined the value of a manor's land and other assets, a tax of so many shillings and pence per pound of value would be levied on the land holder. While this was typically two shillings in the pound the amount did vary; for example, in 1084 it was as high as six shillings in the pound. For the manors at Hemingford Grey the total tax assessed was 20 geld.

Listed as Emingeforde in the Domesday Book, the name Hemingford means "the ford of the people of Hemma or Hemmi", where Hemma is believed to be the name of a Saxon chief. The village was at different times known as East Hemingeford (11th century), Hamicheford (12th), Hemmingeforde Turbervill (13th–14th), Hemmingeforde Parva (13th–14th) and Hemingford Priors (14th–15th).

In around 1140 Payn of Hemingford began the construction of Hemingford Manor, one of the oldest inhabited buildings in England, as well as the present church. The manor was then owned by the Turberville family who for a while gave their name to the village.

In 1276 the village was given its present name by the de Grey family. The manor remained in the possession of the Greys until seized by Henry VII in the fifteenth century after George Grey, 2nd Earl of Kent was unable to settle his debts. The manor was subsequently leased by the crown to a number of people, including Sir Richard Williams (the great-grandfather of Oliver Cromwell); Sir George Howard; Helena, Marchioness of Northampton; and John, Earl of Holderness. In 1721 the manor was sold by the crown, together with half the manor of Hemingford Abbots, to James Mitchell of Fowlmere.

Hemingford Grey grew considerably in the 19th century especially in the area of the London Road which is about a mile east of the village centre and nearer to St Ives. Here there has been some industrial development, a petrol station and the St Ives Motel. The village continued to grow between the wars when simple and attractive bungalows with good–sized gardens were built followed, in more recent years, by several small estate developments.

== Government ==
As a civil parish, Hemingford Grey has a parish council. The parish council is elected by the residents of the parish who have registered on the electoral roll; the parish council is the lowest tier of government in England. A parish council is responsible for providing and maintaining a variety of local services including allotments and a cemetery; grass cutting and tree planting within public open spaces such as a village green or playing fields. The parish council reviews all planning applications that might affect the parish and makes recommendations to Huntingdonshire District Council, which is the local planning authority for the parish. The parish council also represents the views of the parish on issues such as local transport, policing and the environment. The parish council raises its own tax to pay for these services, known as the parish precept, which is collected as part of the Council Tax. The parish council consists of thirteen councillors and a parish clerk. The parish council normally meets on Mondays, two times every month in the Reading Room in Hemingford Grey.

Hemingford Grey was in the historic and administrative county of Huntingdonshire until 1965. From 1965, the village was part of the new administrative county of Huntingdon and Peterborough. Then in 1974, following the Local Government Act 1972, Hemingford Grey became a part of the county of Cambridgeshire.

The second tier of local government is Huntingdonshire District Council which is a non-metropolitan district of Cambridgeshire and has its headquarters in Huntingdon. Huntingdonshire District Council has 52 councillors representing 29 district wards. Huntingdonshire District Council collects the council tax, and provides services such as building regulations, local planning, environmental health, leisure and tourism. Hemingford Grey is a part of the district ward of The Hemingfords and is represented on the district council by two councillors. District councillors serve for four-year terms following elections to Huntingdonshire District Council.

For Hemingford Grey the highest tier of local government is Cambridgeshire County Council which has administration buildings in Cambridge. The county council provides county-wide services such as major road infrastructure, fire and rescue, education, social services, libraries and heritage services. Cambridgeshire County Council consists of 69 councillors representing 60 electoral divisions. Hemingford Grey is part of the electoral division of The Hemingfords and Fen Stanton and is represented on the county council by one councillor.

At Westminster Hemingford Grey is in the parliamentary constituency of Huntingdon, and elects one Member of Parliament (MP) by the first past the post system of election. Huntingdon is represented in the House of Commons by Jonathan Djanogly (Conservative). Jonathan Djanogly has represented the constituency since 2001. The previous member of parliament was John Major (Conservative) who represented the constituency between 1983 and 2001.

== Geography ==
It is situated on the southern bank of the River Great Ouse in the county of Cambridgeshire, with the northern bank occupied by the flood meadow. Until 1965 it was in Huntingdonshire and between 1965 and 1974 it was in the short-lived county of Huntingdon and Peterborough. It adjoins Hemingford Abbots to the west and St Ives on the north of the river and the A14 trunk road passes through the parish about a mile south of the main settlement.

== Demography ==
=== Population ===
In the period 1801 to 1901 the population of Hemingford Grey was recorded every ten years by the UK census. During this time the population was in the range of 354 (the lowest was in 1801) and 1258 (the highest was in 1851).

From 1901, a census was taken every ten years with the exception of 1941 (due to the Second World War).

Parish	1911	1921	1931	1951	1961	1971	1981	1991	2001	2011
Hemingford Grey	800	749	688	939	1,435	2,309	2,314	2,354	2,524	2,532

All population census figures from report Historic Census figures Cambridgeshire to 2011 by Cambridgeshire Insight.

In 2011, Hemingford Grey covered an area of 1,838 acres (744 hectares) and the population density for the parish in 2011 was 881.7 persons per square mile (340.3 per square kilometre).

== Culture and community ==
The centre of the village has an attractive mixture of buildings including thatched timber-framed cottages and the church with its unique truncated spire. Along the riverside path is the The Manor, which was constructed as earlier as the 1130s and is believed to be one of the oldest continuously-inhabited houses in the Britain. One of its notable residents was the children's book author Lucy Boston.

The village is home to a village shop, a primary school, and The Cock public house. The post office closed in 2003, but there is a post office run from St James' Parish Centre (Please note – this post office hosted by the Parish Centre has now moved to the village shop, Hemingford Stores. It has the same opening times as the shop) The 19th century Reading Room is still used for community meetings.

Hemingford Grey has a number of organisations providing recreation and sporting activities for residents. One notable event is the annual Hemingfords' Regatta. Founded in 1901 by the Vicar of Hemingford Grey, Rev. Byrom Holland, and artist Walter Dendy Sadler, the regatta is held annually with the adjoining village of Hemingford Abbots and is believed to be among the oldest village regattas in the country.

== Religious sites ==
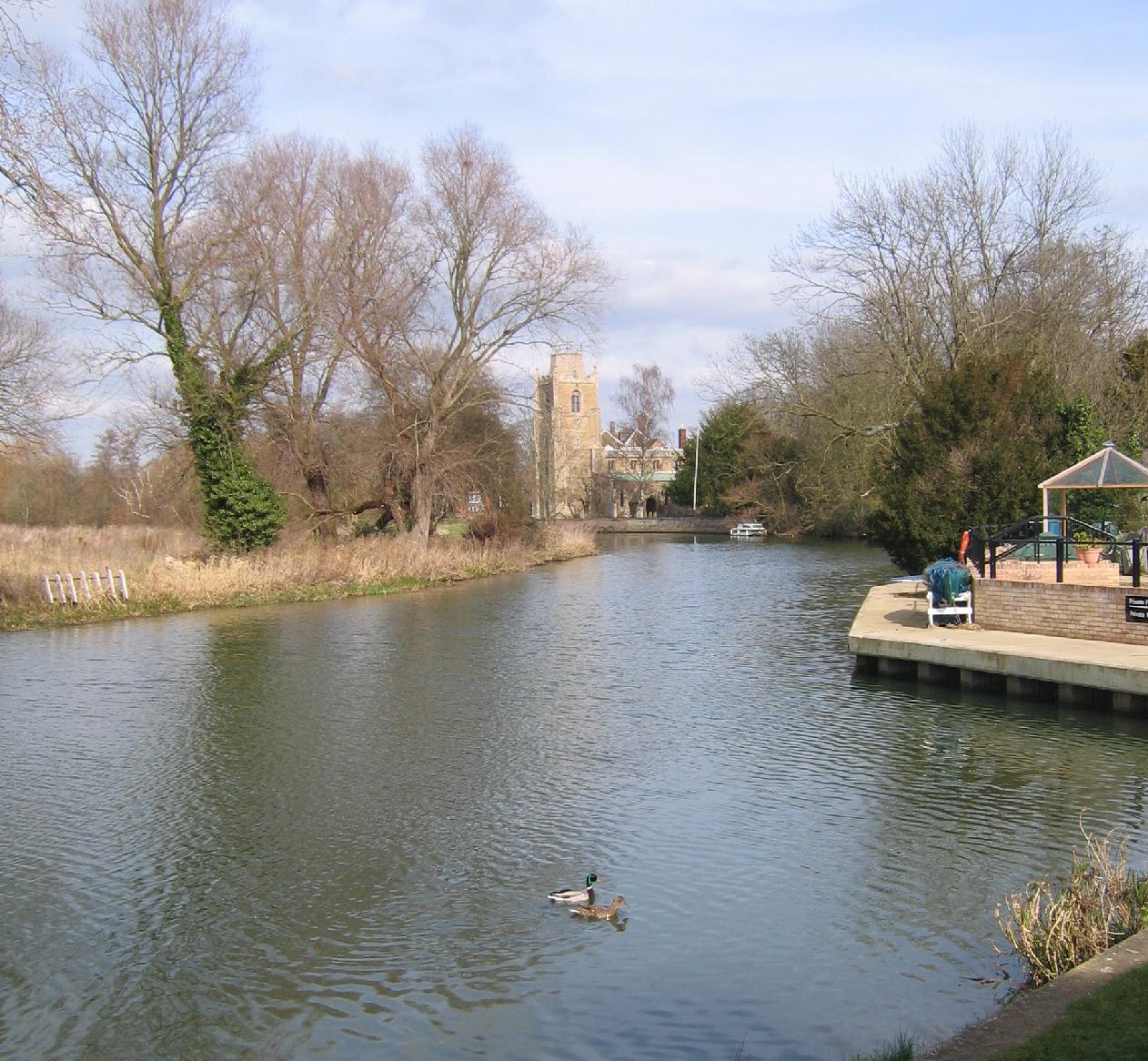
St James' Church, alongside the Ouse

With no church listed in the Domesday Book, it is believed the church, which is dedicated to St James, was first built in the first half of the twelfth century by Payn of Hemingford, a tenant of Ramsey Abbey, and was enlarged over the following centuries. Parts of the medieval church still survive in the south aisle and nave.

The spire collapsed during a hurricane in 1741 and instead of being rebuilt was replaced with eight ball finials at its base. The church is still in active use with up to three services on a Sunday and many more in the week. The church undertook the second phase of a restoration project in 2013 and was closed from March till September. The main part of this work was to replace plasterwork which has been significantly damaged over the years by damp and modern repair and to restore the arcades stonework.

== Industry ==
Farming is still the main land-use with large arable fields to the south and meadows on the low ground near the river. There is limited employment in the village but in recent years there has been a considerable increase in the number of people working from home. This has led to many services being available in the village.

== Notable figures ==
- Lucy M. Boston, writer
- John Major and Norma Major
- the watercolour painter Robert Winchester Fraser (1848–1906), of the Fraser family of artists, several of whom painted the village.
- Elisabeth Vellacott, painter
- Walter Dendy Sadler, painter
