= Elisabeth Vellacott =

English painter

- Born: Elisabeth Jessie Vellcott; 28 January 1905; Grays, Essex, England
- Died: 21 May 2002 (aged 97)
- Known for: portraiture, Landscape

Elisabeth Jessie Vellacott (28 January 1905 – 21 May 2002) was an English painter working on figures and narrative landscapes. In her later work she often painted on wooden board rather than canvas and she had her first solo exhibition at the age of 63 before working long into her 90s.

== Biography ==
Vellacott was born in Grays, Essex in 1905. Her father, Humphrey Vellacott, was a chartered accountant who later became a priest. This change in career meant that Elisabeth and her four brothers lived in Cambridge for much of their childhood.

Vellacott studied at the Royal College of Art, London, where she was taught by Walter Thomas Monnington before returning to Cambridge to work as a textile maker and set designer. Amongst other projects she worked with her friend Gwen Raverat on sets and costumes for the University of Cambridge musical society.

She featured in an episode of The South Bank Show, a television arts magazine show, in 1984.

She was the sister of the classicist and translator Philip Vellacott.

== Painting ==
Vellacott's first solo show was at The Minories, Colchester in 1968 which was followed by exhibitions at New Arts Centre, London and a retrospective at Warwick Arts Trust. She was influenced by Russian icon painting, Indian textiles, Persian miniatures, Chinese and Japanese ceramics. Her later work on panels were characterised by a thin white wash and pale pastel tones. Work by Elisabeth Vellacott features in the following collections:

- Arts Council Collection
- Kettle's Yard
- The Fitzwilliam Museum
- University of Liverpool
- Derby Museum and Art Gallery
- Glasgow Museums
- National Museums Liverpool
