= Brington and Molesworth =

Coordinates: 52.3719°N 0.4176°W

- Civil parish
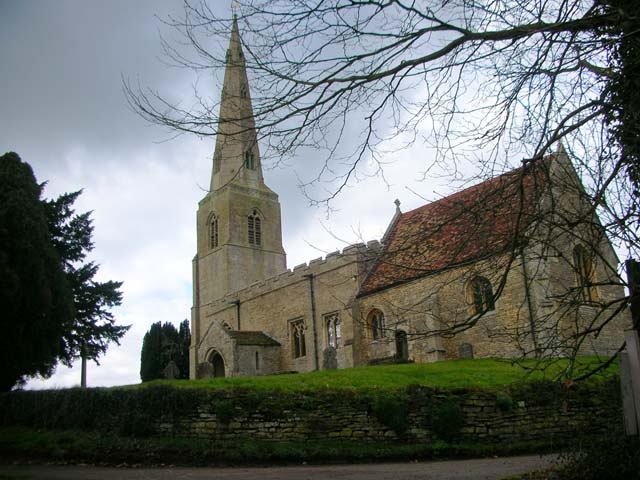
- Brington

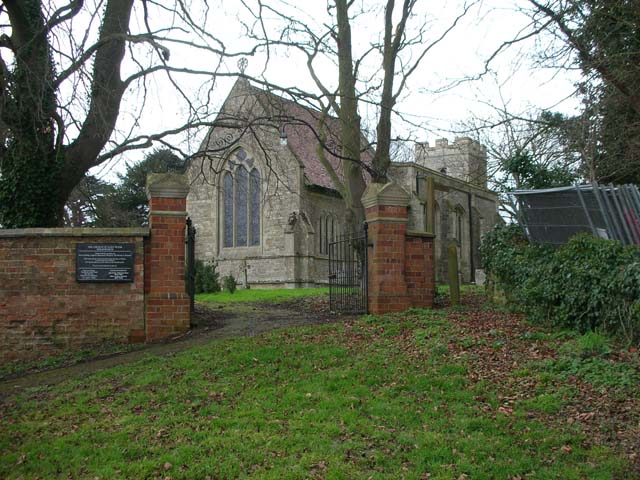
- Molesworth

- Location within Cambridgeshire
- Area: 11.50 km^{2} (4.44 sq mi)
- Population: 423 (2024 estimate)
  - Density: 37/km^{2} (96/sq mi)
- Civil parish: Brington and Molesworth
- District: Huntingdonshire
- Shire county: Cambridgeshire
- Region: East
- Country: England
- Sovereign state: United Kingdom
- Main settlements: Brington and Molesworth
- Police: Cambridgeshire
- Fire: Cambridgeshire
- Ambulance: East of England
- Website: https://bringtonmolesworth-pc.gov.uk/

Brington and Molesworth is a civil parish in the Huntingdonshire district, in the county of Cambridgeshire, England. The parish includes the villages of Brington and Molesworth and RAF Molesworth. It is about 10 miles from Huntingdon. In 2024 the parish had an estimated population of 423. The parish borders Bythorn and Keyston, Catworth, Clopton, Covington, Leighton, Old Weston and Winwick. Brington and Molesworth has a parish council called "Brington and Molesworth Parish Council". There are 27 listed buildings in Brington and Molesworth.

== History ==
The parish was formed on 1 April 1935 from "Brington" and "Molesworth" parishes and became part of Huntingdon Rural District in the county of Huntingdonshire. In 1965 it became part of the county of Huntingdon and Peterborough, in 1974 it became part of Huntingdon non-metropolitan district in the non-metropolitan county of Cambridgeshire, the district was renamed to "Huntingdonshire" in 1984.
