= Thrapston Rural District =

Former local government area in the UK

Coordinates: 52.4°N 0.55°W

Thrapston was a rural district in England from 1894 to 1935. It was one of the only rural districts to be split between administrative counties, with part in Northamptonshire and part in Huntingdonshire.

The Huntingdonshire parishes were:

- Brington
- Bythorn
- Covington
- Keyston
- Molesworth
- Old Weston

The district was abolished in 1935, with most of the Northamptonshire parts going on to become part of the Oundle and Thrapston Rural District (and the parish of Stanwick joining Raunds urban district), while the Huntingdonshire parts went primarily to Huntingdon Rural District. The parish of Covington joined St Neots Rural District.

== Notes ==
- Northamptonshire part
