= Huntingdon Rural District =

Former local government area in the UK

Coordinates: 52.37°N 0.31°W

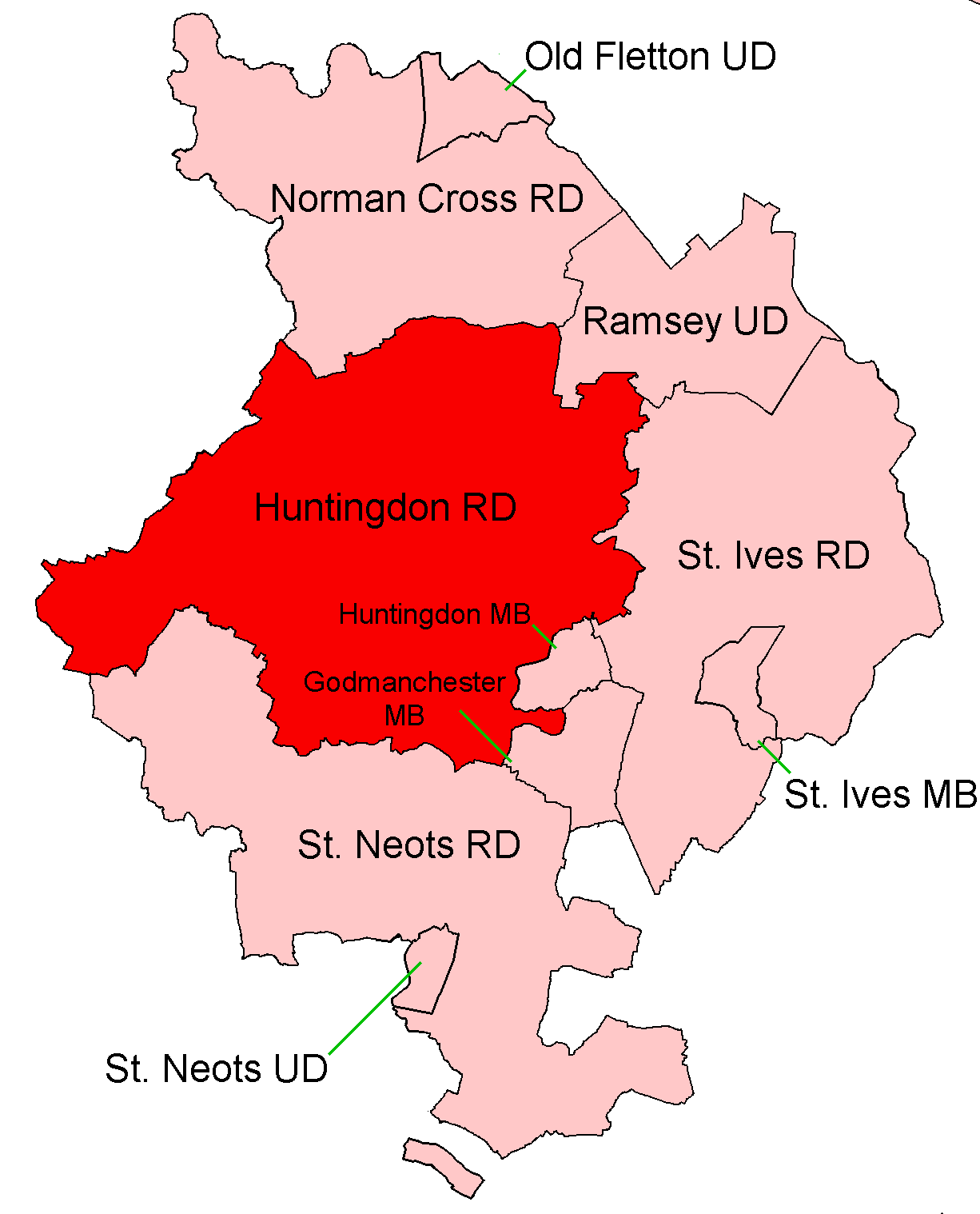
Position within Huntingdonshire

Huntingdon was a rural district in Huntingdonshire from 1894 to 1974, lying to the north and west of urban Huntingdon. It was formed in 1894 under the Local Government Act 1894 from the earlier Huntingdon rural sanitary district.

It was expanded in 1935 by taking in most of the disbanded Thrapston Rural District and part of the Huntingdonshire segment of Oundle Rural District.

In 1965 Huntingdonshire and the Soke of Peterborough merged to form Huntingdon and Peterborough.

In 1974 the district was abolished under the Local Government Act 1972 and became part of the non-metropolitan district of Huntingdon, subsequently renamed Huntingdonshire.

== Parishes ==
Parish	From	To	Notes
Abbots Ripton			
Alconbury			
Alconbury Weston			
Barham and Woolley	1935		Merger of Barham & Woolley
Barham		1935	
Brampton			
Brington and Molesworth	1935		Formerly 2 parishes in Thrapston RD
Buckworth			
Bythorn and Keyston	1935		Formerly 2 parishes in Thrapston RD
Conington			
Coppingford		1935	See Upton and Coppingford
Easton			
Ellington			
Great Gidding	1935		Formerly Oundle RD
Great Raveley		1935	See The Stukeleys
Great Stukeley		1935	See Upwood and the Raveleys
Hamerton			
Hartford		1935	Divided between Huntingdon MB, Houghton & Wyton (St Ives RD) and Kings Ripton
Kings Ripton			
Leighton			
Little Gidding	1935		Formerly Oundle RD
Little Raveley		1935	See The Stukeleys
Little Stukeley		1935	See Upwood and the Raveleys
Old Weston			Formerly Thrapston RD
Sawtry	1935		Merger of the following 2 parishes:
Sawtry All Saints & St Andrew		1935	
Sawtry St Judith		1935	
Spaldwick			
Steeple Gidding			
The Stukeleys	1935		Merger of Great Stukeley & Little Stukeley
Upton and Coppingford	1935		Merger of Upton & Coppingford
Upton		1935	
Upwood and the Raveleys	1935		Merger of Great Raveley, Little Raveley & Upwood
Upwood		1935	
Winwick	1935		Formerly Oundle RD
Wood Walton			
