= Colne, Cambridgeshire =

Village and civil parish in England

Coordinates: 52.36°N 0.01°E

Colne
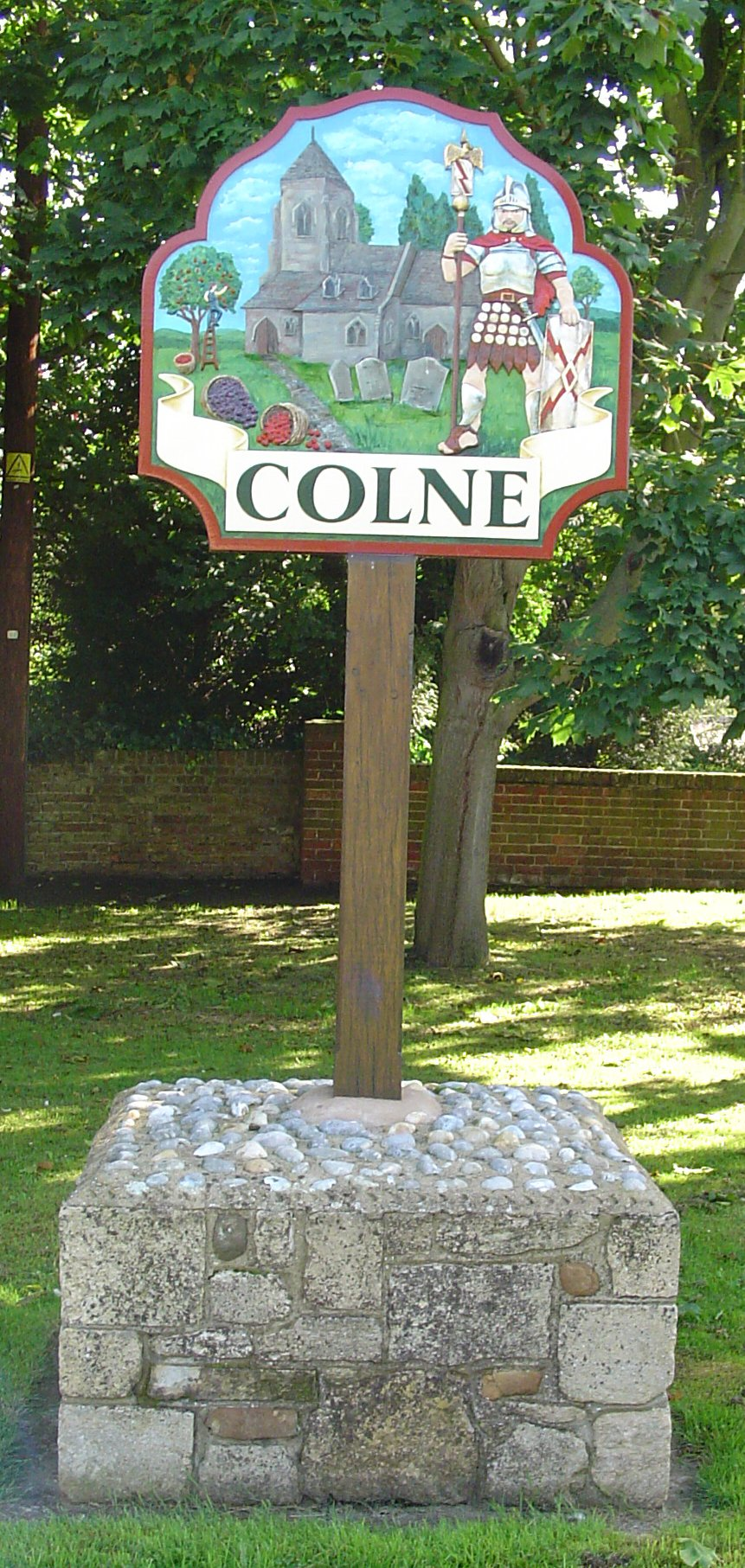
- Signpost in Colne

- Location within Cambridgeshire
- Population: 865 (2011)
- OS grid reference: TL368754
- District: Huntingdonshire
- Shire county: Cambridgeshire
- Region: East
- Country: England
- Sovereign state: United Kingdom
- Post town: Huntingdon
- Postcode district: PE28
- Dialling code: 01487
- Police: Cambridgeshire
- Fire: Cambridgeshire
- Ambulance: East of England
- UK Parliament: North West Cambridgeshire

Colne is a village and civil parish in Cambridgeshire, England. Colne lies about 9 miles (14 km) east of Huntingdon; the villages of Bluntisham, Woodhurst, and Somersham are close by. Colne is situated within Huntingdonshire which is a non-metropolitan district of Cambridgeshire as well as being a historic county of England.

== Toponymy ==
The village was known as Collen in the 13th century and Colneye in the 14th century. The name is pronounced like "cone".

== History ==
In 1085 William the Conqueror ordered that a survey should be carried out across his kingdom to discover who owned which parts and what it was worth. The survey took place in 1086 and the results were recorded in what, since the 12th century, has become known as the Domesday Book. Starting with the king himself, for each landholder within a county there is a list of their estates or manors; and, for each manor, there is a summary of the resources of the manor, the amount of annual rent that was collected by the lord of the manor both in 1066 and in 1086, together with the taxable value.

Colne was listed in the Domesday Book in the Hundred of Hurstingstone in Huntingdonshire; the name of the settlement was written as Colne in the Domesday Book. In 1086 there was just one manor at Colne; the annual rent paid to the lord of the manor in 1066 had been £6 and the rent had fallen to £5 in 1086.

The Domesday Book does not explicitly detail the population of a place but it records that there was 18 households at Colne. There is no consensus about the average size of a household at that time; estimates range from 3.5 to 5.0 people per household. Using these figures then an estimate of the population of Colne in 1086 is that it was within the range of 63 and 90 people.

The Domesday Book uses a number of units of measure for areas of land that are now unfamiliar terms, such as hides and ploughlands. In different parts of the country, these were terms for the area of land that a team of eight oxen could plough in a single season and are equivalent to 120 acres (49 hectares); this was the amount of land that was considered to be sufficient to support a single family. By 1086, the hide had become a unit of tax assessment rather than an actual land area; a hide was the amount of land that could be assessed as £1 for tax purposes. The survey records that there were seven ploughlands at Colne in 1086. In addition to the arable land, there was 10 acres (4 hectares) of meadows and 1,892 acres (766 hectares) of woodland at Colne.

The tax assessment in the Domesday Book was known as geld or danegeld and was a type of land-tax based on the hide or ploughland. It was originally a way of collecting a tribute to pay off the Danes when they attacked England, and was only levied when necessary. Following the Norman Conquest, the geld was used to raise money for the King and to pay for continental wars; by 1130, the geld was being collected annually. Having determined the value of a manor's land and other assets, a tax of so many shillings and pence per pound of value would be levied on the land holder. While this was typically two shillings in the pound the amount did vary; for example, in 1084 it was as high as six shillings in the pound. For the manor at Colne the total tax assessed was six geld.

In 1086 there was no church at Colne.

A large medieval pond, as well as the remains of an 18th-century building, were found in an archaeological excavation at Manor Farm on East Street. The team also found evidence of early to post-medieval pottery and a late medieval animal burial, as well as a 19th-century shoe.

The historical quarrel between Thomas de Lisle, the Bishop of Ely and Blanche of Lancaster, daughter of Henry, Earl of Lancaster, and widow of Thomas Wake of Lidell, arose about property in the village. It is likely that Blanche claimed a mesne lordship over Colne's La Leghe Manor. The Bishop disputed her claim and in 1354 he and his men burnt some houses in the Manor. In 1355 he had Blanche's servant, William de Holme, murdered in Somersham Wood. He was rebuked by Edward III for both crimes and ordered to beg for forgiveness. In retaliation, he appealed to the Pope, and had Blanche and several others excommunicated.

Drurys Manor existed to the east of the old church, but it was demolished circa 1787, and nothing remains of the original building. A site to the west of the old church is likely to be the location of La Leghe Manor, destroyed at an earlier date. The Carter family, Lords of the Manor in the 17th century, are likely to have lived in the village.

Colne suffered a ruinous fire in 1844, which destroyed many of its historic houses and buildings. Several 17th-century half-timbered houses and cottages survived, as did a late 16th-century house near the centre of the village.

== Government ==
As a civil parish, Colne has a parish council. The parish council is elected by the residents of the parish who have registered on the electoral roll; the parish council is the lowest tier of government in England. A parish council is responsible for providing and maintaining a variety of local services including allotments and a cemetery; grass cutting and tree planting within public open spaces such as a village green or playing fields. The parish council reviews all planning applications that might affect the parish and makes recommendations to Huntingdonshire District Council, which is the local planning authority for the parish. The parish council also represents the views of the parish on issues such as local transport, policing and the environment. The parish council raises its own tax to pay for these services, known as the parish precept, which is collected as part of the Council Tax. The parish council has nine councillors and normally meets on the last Tuesday of the month.

Colne was in the historic and administrative county of Huntingdonshire until 1965. From 1965, the village was part of the new administrative county of Huntingdon and Peterborough. Then in 1974, following the Local Government Act 1972, Colne became a part of the county of Cambridgeshire.

The second tier of local government is Huntingdonshire District Council which is a non-metropolitan district of Cambridgeshire and has its headquarters in Huntingdon. Huntingdonshire District Council has 52 councillors representing 29 district wards. Huntingdonshire District Council collects the council tax, and provides services such as building regulations, local planning, environmental health, leisure and tourism. Colne is a part of the district ward of Somersham and is represented on the district council by two councillors. District councillors serve for four-year terms following elections to Huntingdonshire District Council.

For Colne the highest tier of local government is Cambridgeshire County Council which has administration buildings in Cambridge. The county council provides county-wide services such as major road infrastructure, fire and rescue, education, social services, libraries and heritage services. Cambridgeshire County Council consists of 69 councillors representing 60 electoral divisions. Colne is part of the electoral division of Somersham and Earith and is represented on the county council by one councillor.

At Westminster Colne is in the parliamentary constituency of North West Cambridgeshire, and elects one Member of Parliament (MP) by the first past the post system of election. Colne is represented in the House of Commons by Shailesh Vara (Conservative). Shailesh Vara has represented the constituency since 2005. The previous member of parliament was Brian Mawhinney (Conservative) who represented the constituency between 1997 and 2005.

== Demography ==
In the period 1801 to 1901 the population of Colne was recorded every ten years by the UK census. During this time the population was in the range of 260 (the lowest was in 1901) and 544 (the highest was in 1841).

From 1901, a census was taken every ten years with the exception of 1941 (due to the Second World War).

Parish	1911	1921	1931	1951	1961	1971	1981	1991	2001	2011
Colne	339	379	369	424	473	555	813	789	784	865

All population census figures from report Historic Census figures Cambridgeshire to 2011 by Cambridgeshire Insight.

In 2011, the parish covered an area of 1,715 acres (694 hectares) and so the population density for Colne in 2011 was 322.8 persons per square mile (124.6 per square kilometre).

== Community and culture ==
There are no shops in Colne, although there is a public house (The Green Man) and a village hall. The Bluntisham & Colne Women's Institute meets at the village hall once a month.

The nearest primary school is St. Helen's in Bluntisham. The nearest shops and amenities are also in Bluntisham.

== Religious sites ==
The ancient church of St Helen was built between the 13th and 15th centuries. Its walls were chiefly of stone and rubble, but parts of it were brick and the roof was tiled. The nave and aisle were covered with one continuous roof in 1807. On 24 April 1896 the tower fell and destroyed much of the church – the chancel, the aisle walls and the porch were all that survived. The old church was taken down and a new church was built on another site. The church had four bells, three from the 17th century and a later bell from the early 18th century. Three of the bells were removed in 1892, while the fourth fell with the tower, but was undamaged. The south porch is all that remains of the original structure.

The modern St Helens church was built in 1900 and is a Grade II listed building. The building of the new church incorporated rescued elements from the ancient church (including partially restored 13th and 14th century windows and some of the ancient stone). Colne is a chapelry annexed with Pidley.

Near to the centre of the village is the Baptist Chapel built in 1870. The chapel is now defunct.
