= Brington, Cambridgeshire =

Village in Cambridgeshire, England

Coordinates: 52.3697°N 0.4081°W

Brington
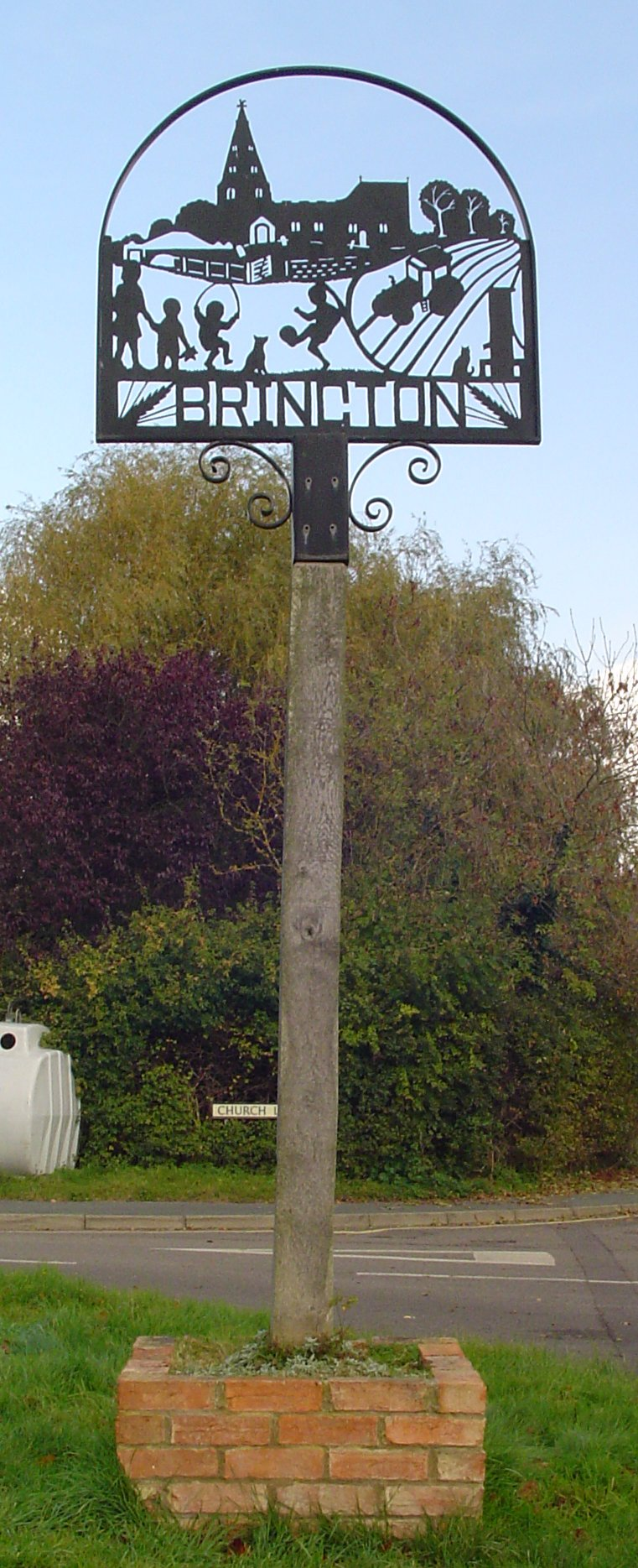
- Signpost in Brington

- Location within Cambridgeshire
- OS grid reference: TL084758
  - London: 60 miles (97 km)
- Civil parish: Brington and Molesworth
- District: Huntingdonshire
- Shire county: Cambridgeshire
- Region: East
- Country: England
- Sovereign state: United Kingdom
- Post town: Huntingdon
- Postcode district: PE28
- Dialling code: 01832
- Police: Cambridgeshire
- Fire: Cambridgeshire
- Ambulance: East of England
- UK Parliament: North West Cambridgeshire

Brington is a village and former civil parish, now in the parish of Brington and Molesworth, in Cambridgeshire, England. Brington lies approximately 9 miles (14 km) north-west of Huntingdon. Brington is situated within Huntingdonshire which is a non-metropolitan district of Cambridgeshire as well as being a historic county of England. In 1931 the parish had a population of 75.

The neighbouring village of Molesworth is 0.7 miles (1.1 km) from Brington. The parish of "Brington and Molesworth" covers an area of 2,842 acres (1,150 hectares). Just to the north of Brington and within the civil parish is RAF Molesworth.

== History ==
In 1085 William the Conqueror ordered that a survey should be carried out across his kingdom to discover who owned which parts and what it was worth. The survey took place in 1086 and the results were recorded in what, since the 12th century, has become known as the Domesday Book. Starting with the king himself, for each landholder within a county there is a list of their estates or manors; and, for each manor, there is a summary of the resources of the manor, the amount of annual rent that was collected by the lord of the manor both in 1066 and in 1086, together with the taxable value.

Brington was listed in the Domesday Book in the Hundred of Leightonstone in Huntingdonshire; the name of the settlement was written as Breninctune in the Domesday Book. In 1086 there was just one manor at Brington; the annual rent paid to the lord of the manor in 1066 had been £4 and the rent was the same in 1086.

The Domesday Book does not explicitly detail the population of a place but it records that there was 14 households at Brington. There is no consensus about the average size of a household at that time; estimates range from 3.5 to 5.0 people per household. Using these figures then an estimate of the population of Brington in 1086 is that it was within the range of 49 and 70 people.

The Domesday Book uses a number of units of measure for areas of land that are now unfamiliar terms, such as hides and ploughlands. In different parts of the country, these were terms for the area of land that a team of eight oxen could plough in a single season and are equivalent to 120 acres (49 hectares); this was the amount of land that was considered to be sufficient to support a single family. By 1086, the hide had become a unit of tax assessment rather than an actual land area; a hide was the amount of land that could be assessed as £1 for tax purposes. The survey records that there were seven ploughlands at Brington in 1086. In addition to the arable land, there was 40 acres (16 hectares) of meadows at Brington.

The tax assessment in the Domesday Book was known as geld or danegeld and was a type of land-tax based on the hide or ploughland. It was originally a way of collecting a tribute to pay off the Danes when they attacked England, and was only levied when necessary. Following the Norman Conquest, the geld was used to raise money for the king and to pay for continental wars; by 1130, the geld was being collected annually. Having determined the value of a manor's land and other assets, a tax of so many shillings and pence per pound of value would be levied on the land holder. While this was typically two shillings in the pound the amount did vary; for example, in 1084 it was as high as six shillings in the pound. For the manor at Brington the total tax assessed was four geld.

In 1086 there was no church at Brington. The land belonged to the Benedictine abbey at Ramsey. The Domesday Book does not mention a church at Brington, but one existed by 1178 when Pope Alexander III confirmed one to Ramsey Abbey.

The inclosure of open fields took place in 1804.

The ecclesiastical parish was known from the Middle Ages as Brington with Bythorn and Old Weston and covered an area of 1,055 acres (427 hectares). In 1936 Bythorn joined with Keyston to form a new ecclesiastical parish; at the same time, Brington and Old Weston joined with Molesworth to form another ecclesiastical parish. In 1935, the civil parish of Brington and Molesworth was created.

The Royal Flying Corps established an airfield near Old Weston to the north of the parish in the First World War which was abandoned in September 1917. During the Second World War an airfield was built in 1940 and 1941 and named RAF Molesworth; from 1942 it was used by the United States Air Force. The runways were demolished in 1973; in the 1980s the area around the base was the scene of anti-nuclear protests. It was announced in January 2015 that the base would be closed.

== Governance ==
Brington is part of the civil parish of Brington and Molesworth, which has a parish council. The parish council is elected by the residents of the parish who have registered on the electoral roll; the parish council is the lowest tier of government in England. A parish council is responsible for providing and maintaining a variety of local services including allotments and a cemetery; grass cutting and tree planting within public open spaces such as a village green or playing fields. The parish council reviews all planning applications that might affect the parish and makes recommendations to Huntingdonshire District Council, which is the local planning authority for the parish. The parish council also represents the views of the parish on issues such as local transport, policing and the environment. The parish council raises its own tax to pay for these services, known as the parish precept, which is collected as part of the Council Tax. On 1 April 1935 the parish of Brington was abolished to form "Brington and Molesworth".

Brington was in the historic and administrative county of Huntingdonshire until 1965. From 1965, the village was part of the new administrative county of Huntingdon and Peterborough. Then in 1974, following the Local Government Act 1972, Brington became a part of the county of Cambridgeshire.

The second tier of local government is Huntingdonshire District Council which is a non-metropolitan district of Cambridgeshire and has its headquarters in Huntingdon. Huntingdonshire District Council has 52 councillors representing 29 district wards. Huntingdonshire District Council collects the council tax, and provides services such as building regulations, local planning, environmental health, leisure and tourism. Brington is a part of the district ward of Ellington and is represented on the district council by one councillor. District councillors serve for four-year terms following elections to Huntingdonshire District Council.

For Brington the highest tier of local government is Cambridgeshire County Council which has administration buildings in Cambridge. The county council provides county-wide services such as major road infrastructure, fire and rescue, education, social services, libraries and heritage services. Cambridgeshire County Council consists of 69 councillors representing 60 electoral divisions. Brington is a part of the electoral division of Sawtry and Ellington and is represented on the county council by one councillor. County councillors serve for four-year terms following elections to Cambridgeshire County Council.

At Westminster, Brington is in the parliamentary constituency of North West Cambridgeshire and elects one Member of Parliament (MP) by the first past the post system of election. Brington is represented in the House of Commons by Shailesh Vara (Conservative). Shailesh Vara has represented the constituency since 2005. The previous member of parliament was Brian Mawhinney (Conservative) who represented the constituency between 1997 and 2005.

== Geography ==
The village and parish lies on a bedrock of Oxford clay and in regions there are superficial Glaciofluvial and River Terrace deposits of sand and gravel from the Quaternary period, together with alluvium (clay and silt) from the same period. The land in the north of the parish is characterised as Oadby Member Diamicton, again from the Quaternary period, with rocks formed during Ice Age conditions by glaciers scouring the land.

The village, which is approximately 43 metres (141 ft) above sea level, lies on the B660 just to the north of Junction 16 of the A14 road that runs from the Port of Felixstowe to the Catthorpe Interchange, Leicestershire.

== Demography ==
Village	1801	1811	1821	1831	1841	1851	1881	1891	1901	1911	1921	1931	1951	1971	1986	1991	2001	2011	2021
Brington	144	157	164	150	129	172	169	137	86	96	81	75	–	–	66	–	–	–	–
Brington and Molesworth	–	–	–	–	–	–	–	–	–	–	–	–	285	376	–	374	412	342	418

Census: Brington 1801–1931 Census: Brington and Molesworth 1951, 1971, 1991 Domesday Reloaded Survey 1986 Census: Brington and Molesworth (Parish) 2001–2011

== Culture and community ==
The Wheatsheaf public house closed in the 1950s and the site was redeveloped for private housing.

== Education ==
There is a primary school in Brington.

== Religious sites ==
The Anglican church at Brington is dedicated to All Saints; it is in the deanery of Huntingdon in the diocese of Ely. The 12th century church was rebuilt in the 13th century; the nave was re-roofed in 1674 and the chancel was re-roofed in 1868.
