= Bluntisham =

Village in Cambridgeshire, England

Coordinates: 52.35°N 0.017°E

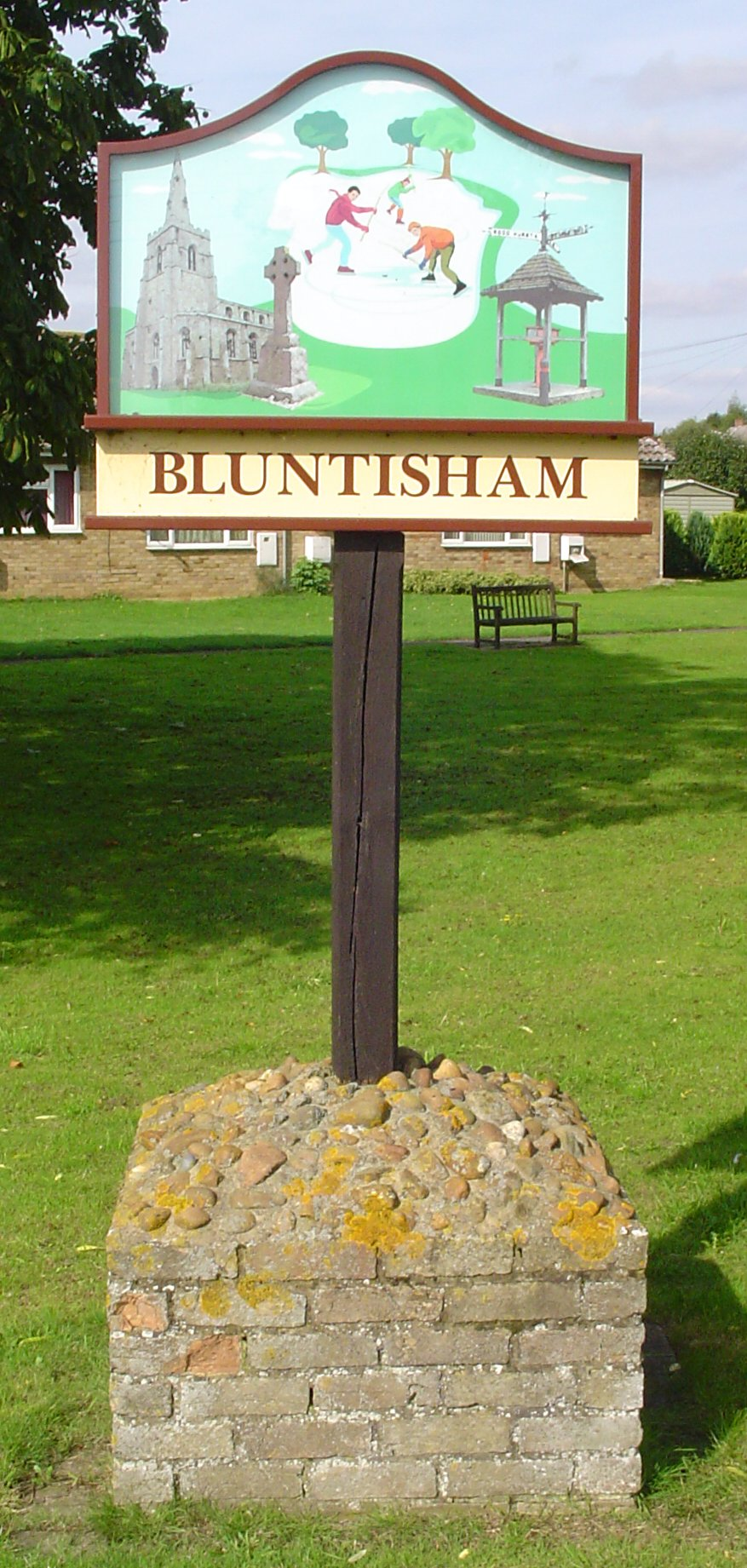
- Village sign in Bluntisham

- Location within Cambridgeshire
- Population: 2,003 (2011)
- OS grid reference: TL373743
- District: Huntingdonshire
- Shire county: Cambridgeshire
- Region: East
- Country: England
- Sovereign state: United Kingdom
- Post town: HUNTINGDON
- Postcode district: PE28
- Dialling code: 01487
- Police: Cambridgeshire
- Fire: Cambridgeshire
- Ambulance: East of England
- UK Parliament: North West Cambridgeshire

Bluntisham is a village and civil parish in Cambridgeshire, England. The population of the civil parish at the 2011 census was 2,003. Bluntisham lies approximately 8 miles (13 km) east of Huntingdon. Bluntisham is situated within Huntingdonshire which is a non-metropolitan district of Cambridgeshire as well as being a historic county of England. The villages of Earith, Colne, Woodhurst, and Somersham are all close by.

The prime meridian passes through the western edge of Bluntisham.

== Toponymy ==
The village was known as Bluntersham between the 10th and 13th centuries, Blondesham in the 14th century, and Bluntysham, Bluntsome and Blunsham in the 16th century. Due to the close proximity of Bluntisham and Earith, the two formed the parish of Bluntisham-cum-Earith, with the parish church in Bluntisham and a chapelry in Earith. However, the civil parish of Bluntisham-cum-Earith was dissolved in 1948 when the two were separated.

== History ==
There is evidence to suggest that Neolithic and Roman inhabitants once settled in Bluntisham. The manor of Bluntisham goes back to the early part of the 10th century, when it was seized by Toli the Dane, who is said to have been the jarl or alderman of Huntingdon. Toli was killed at the Battle of Tempsford in 917, at which point the county returned to the rule of Edward the Elder. Bluntisham later became the property of Wulfnoth Cild who sold it circa 970–75 to Bishop Æthelwold of Winchester and Brithnoth, the first Abbot of Ely, for the endowment of Ely Abbey. The sale was confirmed by King Edgar, but when he died in 975 a claim was made by the sons of Bogo de Hemingford, who believed that it was the inheritance of their uncle. Their claim was declared false at the county court, and the sale to Ely Abbey went ahead.

Bluntisham was listed as Bluntesham in the Domesday Book of 1086 in the Hundred of Hurstingstone in Huntingdonshire. There were two manors and 16 households at Bluntisham, giving an approximate population of 56 to 80 people. The survey records that there was 6 ploughlands with the capacity for a further 2.62. In addition to the arable land, there was 20 acres (8 hectares) of meadows and 194 acres (79 hectares) of woodland. For the manors at Bluntisham the total tax assessed was seven geld. There was already a church and a priest at Bluntisham.

Bluntisham remained under ownership of the Bishop of Ely until the dissolution of the monasteries, when it was granted to the dean and chapter of Ely. Valentine Walton was appointed governor of Ely in 1649 for his services to Oliver Cromwell's Parliament. Upon the Restoration, it was restored to the dean and chapter. In 1869, it was taken over by the Ecclesiastical Commissioners, who remain lords of the manor.

The village was built up around four fields. The north-western part of the parish contains Higham Field, with Gull Field (named for the gills which slope towards the Great Ouse) to the south-west. Colneway Field lay to the north-east of Higham Field, with Old Mill (or "Inhams") Field located between Colneway and Bury Fen, stretching to Earith. A large wood known as "Bluntisham Hangar" once existed south of Highams Field, and is probably that mentioned in the Domesday Book. In 1341 the wood was recorded as the boundary of the Bishop of Ely's right of hunting. Bluntisham's woodland declined from 68 acres (28 ha) in 1843 to 10 acres (4.0 ha) by 1925.

== Government ==
As a civil parish, Bluntisham has a parish council. Bluntisham Parish Council has eleven members and normally meets on the first Monday of every month in the village hall. The second tier of local government is Huntingdonshire District Council which is a non-metropolitan district of Cambridgeshire. Bluntisham is a part of the district ward of Earith and is represented on the district council by two councillors. For Bluntisham the highest tier of local government is Cambridgeshire County Council. Bluntisham is a part of the electoral division of Somersham and Earith and is represented on the county council by one councillor.

Bluntisham was in the historic and administrative county of Huntingdonshire until 1965. From 1965, the village was part of the new administrative county of Huntingdon and Peterborough. Then in 1974, following the Local Government Act 1972, Bluntisham became a part of the county of Cambridgeshire.

At Westminster, Bluntisham is in the parliamentary constituency of North West Cambridgeshire. Since 2005 the constituency has been represented in the House of Commons by Shailesh Vara of the Conservative Party.

== Geography ==
The area is low-lying and very flat. The gravel soil is used to grow fruit trees, barley and oats, while wheat is grown in the loam and clay soil. The village was once home to many orchards, and fruit farming was very profitable. Some residents still sell fruit on roadside stalls, but oilseed rape is the more popular crop nowadays. Traditionally water was derived from gravel springs, but later wells were fed by surface water. A hand water pump, now defunct, still stands on the high street. Somersham Road yielded a chalybeate spring, where more than one attempt was made in the 18th century to establish a spa. The "healing" properties of its waters were recommended by John Addenbrooke (d.1719), founder of Addenbrooke's Hospital in Cambridge, among others.

== Landmarks ==
The Old Rectory, now known as Bluntisham House, was built circa 1720, with wings added in the 18th century and further alterations in the 19th century. The doorway was taken from the Old Slepe Hall in St Ives, the former home of Oliver Cromwell. The building, once the childhood home of the writer Dorothy L. Sayers, has a Grade II* listing.

== Culture and community ==
The parish was once home to the most successful Bandy club in British history, the Bury Fen Bandy club. From this famous club came Charles Goodman Tebbutt, who was responsible for the first published rules of Bandy in 1882. Bury Fen is still popular for ice skating when it floods and freezes over in colder winters.

The author and agricultural reformist H. Rider Haggard visited the village in 1901, while travelling through Huntingdonshire. He commented on the "very excellent dwellings", built for local agricultural workers.

The Barograph in the centre of the High Street was erected in 1911 as a memorial to some of the Tebbutt family and is kept in working order by the Bluntisham Feoffees charity.

== Transport ==
Local buses are provided by local company Dews Coaches (route 301 to St Ives Mon-Sat, route 21 to St Ives Mon-Fri) and Vectare (route 22 to St Ives Sat).

== Education ==
Bluntisham has its own primary school, St Helen's, which educates children aged 4–11. The school is linked to the secondary school Abbey College, in Ramsey.

== Local amenities ==
As of December 2022, the village has the following amenities:

- Village hall (hosting a variety of activities including line dancing and badminton)
- Recycling centre (on Heath Road)
- Petrol station
- Public house
- Local shop
- Local gym
- Fish and chip shop
- Hairdresser
- Local bus services
- Car repair workshop
- Parish church
- Baptist church
- Playing fields (football and cricket)
- Orchard

== Religious sites ==
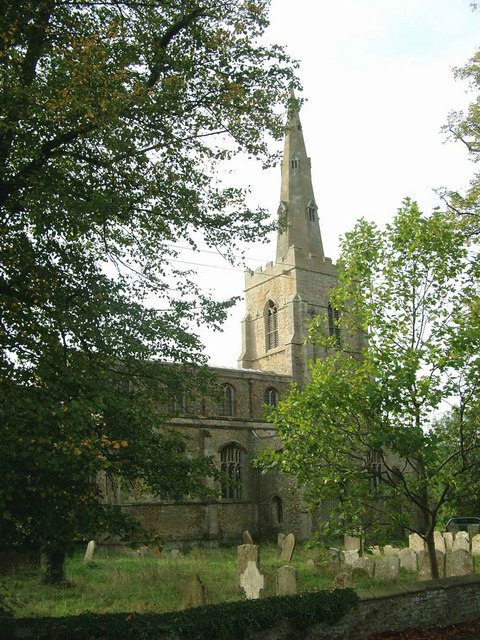
St Mary's Church, Bluntisham

The oldest church in Bluntisham is St Mary's Church on Rectory Road. It is likely to be the church mentioned in the Domesday record for Bluntisham, however the original building no longer exists. The chapel was built in the 1330s, and the west tower from 1370 to 1380. Part of the church was rebuilt in 1450, and restoration work was carried out from 1850 to 1913. The church has eight bells, three of which date from the 1500s. The church can list its rectors back to 1217, and counts among them Henry Sayers, father of the crime novelist Dorothy L. Sayers. St Mary's is a Grade I listed building with an organ and regular bell ringing sessions.

There is also a Baptist Church on the High Street, which has existed in Bluntisham in some form since the 18th century. John Wheatley, a local carpenter, was a member of the Church and built the Meeting House and School buildings in the 19th century. In the School he placed a number of hand-carved wooden heads, thought to be likenesses of himself and his friends. He was also a teacher at the Sunday School.

== Notable residents ==
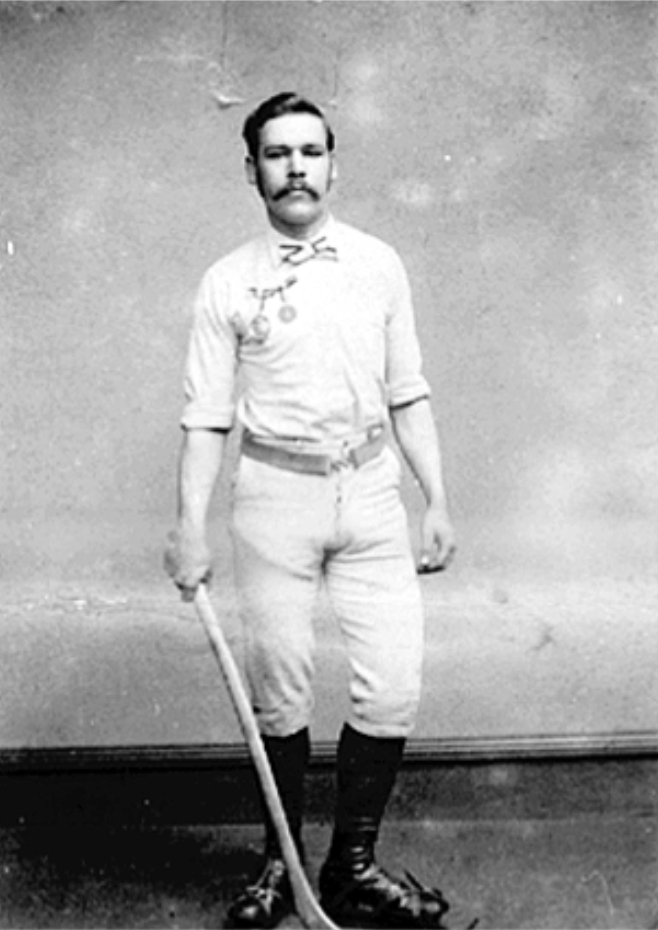
Charles Goodman Tebbutt with a bandy stick

- Crime writer Dorothy L. Sayers lived in the village from 1897, when her father became the rector, to 1917. Her novel The Nine Tailors was inspired by her father's restoration of the Bluntisham church bells in 1910.
- Sir Jervoise Athelstane Baines, an administrator in the Indian Civil Service who headed the 1891 Census of India, was born on 17 October 1847 in the village.
- Peter Godfrey (1922–2017) choral conductor in England and New Zealand was born in Bluntisham
- Speed skater and bandy player Charles Goodman Tebbutt came from Bluntisham. He was responsible for writing most of the modern bandy rules.
- Jazz musician Chris Barber lived in Bluntisham.
- Musician Terry Reid grew up in the village.
- Matt Bellamy, lead singer of Muse spent his early childhood living in the village.
