= Oundle Rural District =

Former local government area in the UK

Coordinates: 52.45°N 0.48°W

Oundle was a rural district in England from 1894 to 1935.

It was formed under the Local Government Act 1894 from the Oundle rural sanitary district. It was one of only a few such districts to cross a county border, with parishes in both Northamptonshire and Huntingdonshire.

In 1935 it was abolished, under the Local Government Act 1929. The Northamptonshire part went to form the Oundle and Thrapston Rural District, and from the Huntingdonshire part, the parish of Elton became part of Norman Cross Rural District whilst the parishes of Great Gidding, Little Gidding and Winwick became part of Huntingdon Rural District.
