= St Ives Rural District =

Former rural district in England

Coordinates: 52.36°N 0.06°W

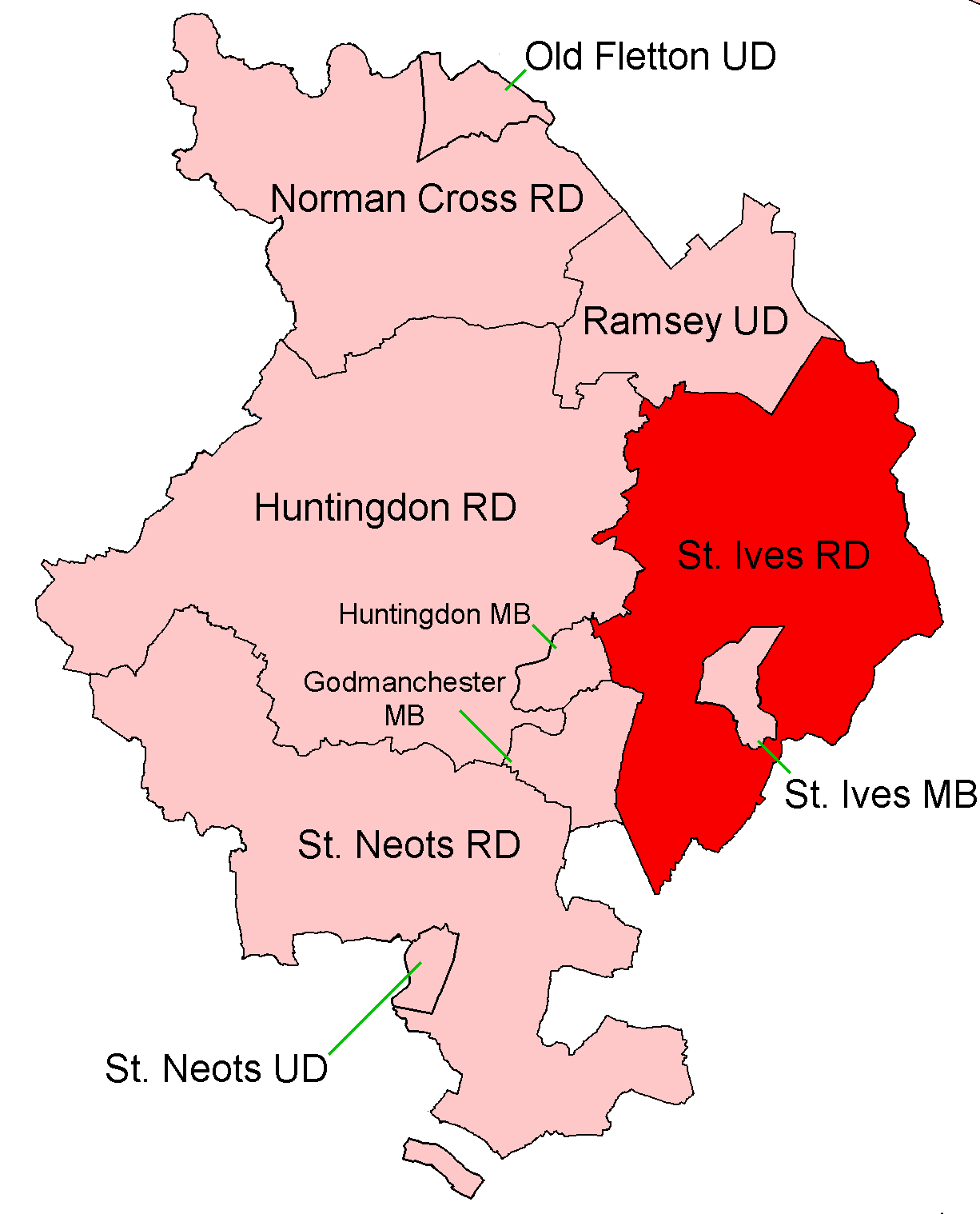
Position within Huntingdonshire

St Ives was a rural district in Huntingdonshire from 1894 to 1974, surrounding the urban area of St Ives. It was formed under the Local Government Act 1894 from the part of the St Ives rural sanitary district which was in Huntingdonshire (the rest, being in Cambridgeshire, formed the Swavesey Rural District).

It was expanded slightly in 1935 by taking in part of the disbanded Hartford parish.

In 1965 Huntingdonshire and the Soke of Peterborough merged to form Huntingdon and Peterborough, and the area of St Ives RD was reducuced very slightly.

In 1974 the district was abolished under the Local Government Act 1972 and became part of the non-metropolitan district of Huntingdon, subsequently renamed Huntingdonshire.

== Parishes ==
Parish	From	To	Notes
Bluntisham cum Earith		1948	Divided into Bluntisham and Earith
Bluntisham	1948		
Broughton			
Bury			
Colne			
Earith	1948		Created by division of Bluntisham cum Earith
Fenstanton			
Hemingford Abbots			
Hemingford Grey			
Hilton			
Holywell cum Needingworth			
Houghton and Wyton	1935		Merger of Houghton, Wyton and part of Hartford from Huntingdon RD
Houghton			
Old Hurst			
Pidley cum Fenton			
Somersham			
Warboys			
Wistow			
Woodhurst			
Wyton			See Houghton and Wyton
