= The Raveleys =

Two villages in Cambridgeshire, England

Coordinates: 52.41°N 0.16°W

Little Raveley, Great Raveley
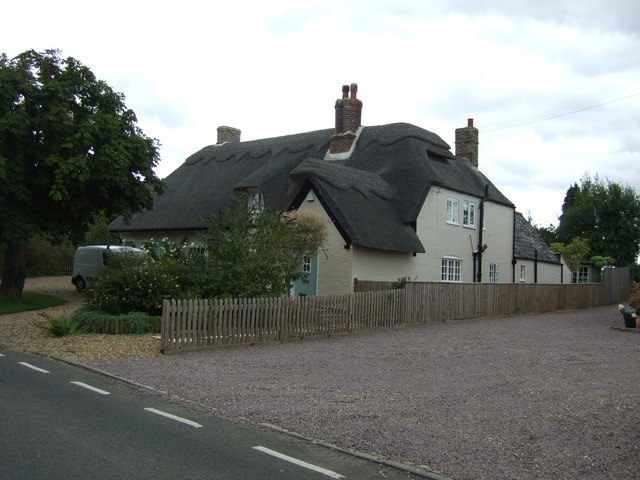
- Great Raveley

- Location within Cambridgeshire
- Population: 1,287 (2011 Census)
- Civil parish: Upwood and the Raveleys
- District: Huntingdonshire
- Shire county: Cambridgeshire
- Region: East
- Country: England
- Sovereign state: United Kingdom
- Post town: Huntingdon
- Postcode district: PE28
- Police: Cambridgeshire
- Fire: Cambridgeshire
- Ambulance: East of England
- UK Parliament: North West Cambridgeshire

Great Raveley and Little Raveley are villages near Upwood south of Ramsey. They are located in Huntingdonshire (now part of Cambridgeshire), England, 3½ miles south-west of Ramsey. The population is included in the civil parish of Upwood and the Raveleys.

== Great Raveley ==
Also spelled:

- Rorflea, Roflea, Raflea, Reflea (10th century);
- Rauesle, Ravele Major (13th century);
- Magna Rauele, Great Ravele, Raffleya (14th century).

At Great Raveley are various earthworks and moated sites. Buildings dating from the 17th century include the Manor House and the former Three Horseshoes Inn, now a private dwelling. There is no church in this tiny village.

The parish of Great Raveley covers 1,781 acres of mostly clay land, rising from Great Raveley Fen in the north, where the height above ordnance datum is only 3 ft. 6 in., to 129 ft. at Top Road in the southwest corner of the parish. The greater part of the parish is high land where wheat and beans are grown; the pasture land covers less than a third of the area. There are some 32 acres of woodland.

The village is built along a branch road to Wood Walton. At the south-east end on the top of the hill is the Manor House, a 17th-century building now much modernised. Near here, facing the Huntingdon Road, is the pound. Lower down are the Methodist Chapel and the school. There are some 17th-century half-timbered cottages and the former Three Horseshoes public house, which has a good chimney stack. At White House Farm, at the west end of the village, is an ancient barn. A short distance north-west of this farm is a square homestead moat within which stood the ancient manor house of Moyne's Manor.

The manor of Great Raveley was a monastic possession until the dissolution of the monasteries. It was then held by the Sewster family from 1540 until 1667, when Frances Sewster, heiress to the manor, married into the Peyton family.

== Little Raveley ==
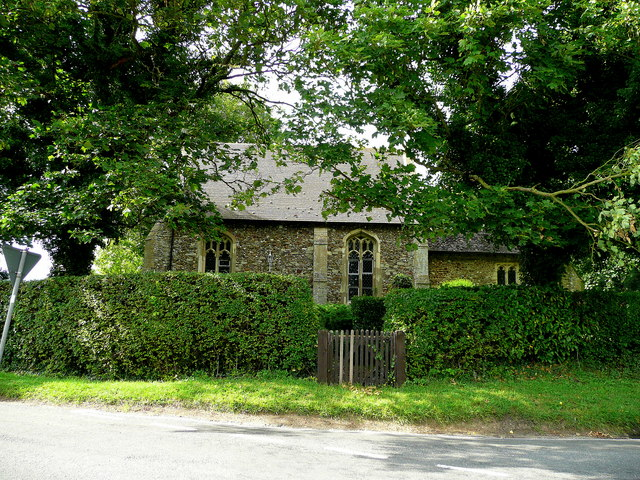
The former Church of St James, Little Raveley

Also spelled:

- Rorflea, Raeflea, Rafflea, Raffley (10th century);
- Parva Ravele, Ravele Minor (13th century).

The even smaller village of Little Raveley once had a correspondingly small church, the Church of St James, which has an Early English chancel and a 15th-century nave. The church has closed and the building is now used as a private residence.

The parish of Little Raveley has an area of 751 acres of clay land, most of which is agricultural. The land is fairly level, being for the greater part a little more than 100 ft. above ordnance datum. Raveley Wood, within the parish, and Wennington Wood, just outside in Abbots Ripton parish, form a considerable stretch of woodland along the southwest border. The village lies on the winding road from Broughton to Great Raveley at a point where a branch road goes westward to Wennington and Abbots Ripton. It consists only of the church, which is in the north-west angle formed by these roads, and some four farm houses, four cottages and four county council houses, the population in 1921 being only 45 persons.

=== Church ===
It is thought that St James' Church, Little Raveley, was built in about 1230 with the nave being rebuilt in the late 14th century when it was widened. Restoration work was carried out on the chancel in 1914 and, in 1975 the church was de-consecrated, becoming a private house. Its religious artefacts, including the font, are now in Peterborough Museum.

The church of St James consists of a chancel (19¼ ft. by 14¾ ft.) and a nave (31 ft. by 16¾ ft.). The walls are of rubble with stone dressings partly plastered and the roofs covered with tiles. The chancel was probably built c. 1230, and the nave rebuilt late in the 14th century, when it was widened to the south. The chancel was restored in 1914.

The 13th-century chancel has a two-light east window of c. 1350, and just north of it is a foliated corbel-capital, of c. 1230. The north wall has a 14th-century square-headed two-light window. In the south wall is a similar window, a 13th-century doorway with bracketed lintel, a square-headed low-side window, a 13th-century piscina with trefoiled head, and a plain square recess. The arch is of early 16th-century date, of two orders, the inner carried on engaged shafts with moulded capitals and bases. The roof appears to be of late 15th-century date. The altar table is of mid-17th century, with turned legs.

The north wall of the late 14th-century nave has two original two-light windows and a blocked doorway. The south wall has two early 16th-century windows, a doorway of similar date and a 15th-century piscina with shelf. The windows contain small fragments of ancient glass. The west wall has no window, but a large buttress in the middle; in the gable above is a bell-cote for two bells, formerly standing up above a flat roof, but now, by the raising of the gable, incorporated in the western wall and below the line of the present roof. The nave roof is mostly modern, but has three old tie-beams and braces.

Little Raveley was a chapelry subordinate to Wistow apparently until Wistow obtained parochial rights in 1351, when it was directly dependent upon Bury. The chapel is first mentioned in the bull of Pope Alexander in 1178. It is uncertain when it first acquired the parochial rights of baptism, marriage and burial, but the font is of the 15th century and the parish registers go back to 1576. The living was a donative, the incumbents, who were called chaplains or curates, being collated by the lord of the manor. In the Parliamentary Survey of 1649, Little Raveley is said to be a chapelry of Bury and a donative worth £12 a year, and that Great Raveley, lying within a quarter of a mile, having neither church nor chapel, was very convenient to be joined to Little Raveley, but this proposal was not carried out. About 1867 Lord Sandwich, as lord of the manor, relinquished his right to the donative and the living became a vicarage in his patronage.

== Government ==
Great Raveley and Little Raveley are part of the civil parish of Upwood and the Raveleys, which has a parish council. The parish council is elected by the residents of the parish who have registered on the electoral roll; the parish council is the lowest tier of government in England. A parish council is responsible for providing and maintaining a variety of local services including allotments and a cemetery; grass cutting and tree planting within public open spaces such as a village green or playing fields. The parish council reviews all planning applications that might affect the parish and makes recommendations to Huntingdonshire District Council, which is the local planning authority for the parish. The parish council also represents the views of the parish on issues such as local transport, policing and the environment. The parish council raises its own tax to pay for these services, known as the parish precept, which is collected as part of the Council Tax.

The Raveleys were in the historic and administrative county of Huntingdonshire until 1965. From 1965, the villages were part of the new administrative county of Huntingdon and Peterborough. Then in 1974, following the Local Government Act 1972, the Raveleys became a part of the county of Cambridgeshire.

The second tier of local government is Huntingdonshire District Council which is a non-metropolitan district of Cambridgeshire and has its headquarters in Huntingdon. Huntingdonshire District Council has 52 councillors representing 29 district wards. Huntingdonshire District Council collects the council tax, and provides services such as building regulations, local planning, environmental health, leisure and tourism. Great Raveley and Little Raveley are part of the district ward of Upwood and The Raveleys and is represented on the district council by one councillor. District councillors serve for four-year terms following elections to Huntingdonshire District Council.

For The Raveleys the highest tier of local government is Cambridgeshire County Council which has administration buildings in Cambridge. The county council provides county-wide services such as major road infrastructure, fire and rescue, education, social services, libraries and heritage services. Cambridgeshire County Council consists of 69 councillors representing 60 electoral divisions. The Raveleys are part of the electoral division of Warboys and Upwood and is represented on the county council by one councillor.

At Westminster The Raveleys are in the parliamentary constituency of North West Cambridgeshire, and elect one Member of Parliament (MP) by the first past the post system of election. The Raveleys are represented in the House of Commons by Shailesh Vara (Conservative). Shailesh Vara has represented the constituency since 2005. The previous member of parliament was Brian Mawhinney (Conservative) who represented the constituency between 1997 and 2005.

== Demography ==
=== Population ===
In the period 1801 to 1901 the population of Great Raveley was recorded every ten years by the UK census. During this time the population was in the range of 108 (the lowest was in 1801) and 326 (the highest was in 1851). At the same time, the population of Little Raveley was in the range of 44 (the lowest was in 1891) and 83 (the highest was in 1801).

From 1901, a census was taken every ten years with the exception of 1941 (due to the Second World War).

Parish	1911	1921	1931	1951	1961	1971	1981	1991	2001	2011
Great Raveley	168	152	162							
Little Raveley	46	45	51							
Upwood	376	339	322							
Upwood and The Raveleys	590	536	535	569	1,085	1,169	955	1,321	1,218	1,287

All population census figures from report Historic Census figures Cambridgeshire to 2011 by Cambridgeshire Insight. The parishes of Great Raveley, Little Raveley and Upwood were combined into a single parish between 1931 and 1951.

In 2011, the parish covered an area of 4,663 acres (1,887 hectares) and so the population density for Upwood and The Raveleys in 2011 was 176.6 persons per square mile (68.2 per square kilometre).
