= Eaton Socon Rural District =

Former rural district in Bedfordshire, England

Coordinates: 52.219°N 0.289°W

- Rural district
- Population
  - 1901: 3,336
  - 1931: 3,224
- History
  - Created: 28 December 1894
  - Abolished: 31 March 1934
  - Succeeded by: Bedford Rural District
  - HQ: Eaton Socon
- Contained within
  - County Council: Bedfordshire
- Map of boundary as of abolition

Eaton Socon was a rural district in Bedfordshire, England, from 1894 to 1934.

The district had its origins in the St Neots Rural Sanitary District. This had been created under the Public Health Acts of 1872 and 1875, giving public health and local government responsibilities for rural areas to the existing Boards of Guardians of Poor Law Unions.

Under the Local Government Act 1894, Rural Sanitary Districts became Rural Districts from 28 December 1894, and rural sanitary districts which straddled county boundaries were to be split so that separate rural districts were created for the parts in each county. Generally, the Bedfordshire part of the St Neots Rural Sanitary District became the Eaton Socon Rural District, whilst the Huntingdonshire part became the St Neots Rural District. As an exception to this rule, the Bedfordshire and Huntingdonshire County Councils agreed that the parish of Swineshead, despite being in Huntingdonshire, would be included in the Eaton Socon Rural District as it was surrounded by Bedfordshire parishes. Similarly, the parish of Tilbrook in Bedfordshire was included in the St Neots Rural District as it formed a long salient sticking out from Bedfordshire into territory almost surrounded by Huntingdonshire. The county boundary was changed two years later to match the boundary which had been agreed for the Rural Districts, with Swineshead becoming part of Bedfordshire and Tilbrook part of Huntingdonshire on 30 September 1896.

The link with the Poor Law Union continued, with all the elected councillors of both Eaton Socon and St Neots Rural District Councils being ex officio members of the St Neots Board of Guardians. The Rural District Council generally met at the St Neots Union Workhouse on St Neots Road in Eaton Socon.

The rural district comprised a thin strip of land along the north-eastern edge of Bedfordshire, containing the following civil parishes:

- Dean
- Eaton Socon
- Little Barford
- Little Staughton
- Pertenhall
- Shelton
- Swineshead

Eaton Socon Rural District was abolished under a County Review Order being merged into the Bedford Rural District on 1 April 1934. The council's final meeting was held on 29 March 1934 at the offices of the clerk to the council, John Adams Ennals, at New Street in St Neots. He had served as clerk to the council throughout its 39-year existence, whilst the last chairman, William Bailey, had been chairman for 24 years. Most of the area now forms part of the Bedford district in Bedfordshire, apart from part of Eaton Socon parish (including the village itself) which was transferred to become part of the town of St. Neots in 1965.
