= St Neots Rural District =

Former rural district in England

Coordinates: 52.26°N 0.26°W

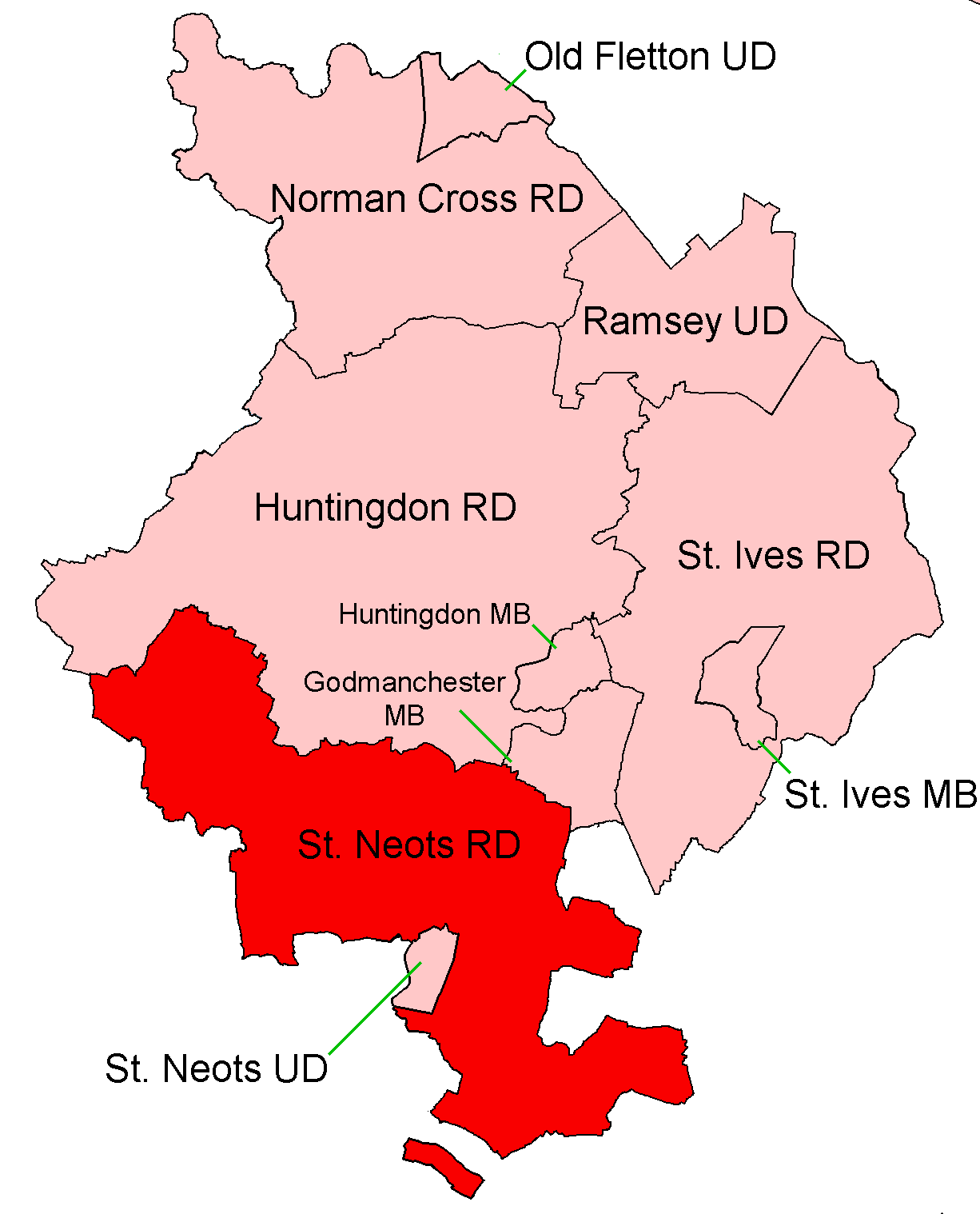
Position within Huntingdonshire

St Neots was a rural district in Huntingdonshire, England from 1894 to 1974, around the northern and eastern sides of the urban area of St Neots.

The district had its origins in the St Neots Rural Sanitary District. This had been created under the Public Health Acts of 1872 and 1875, giving public health and local government responsibilities for rural areas to the existing Boards of Guardians of Poor Law Unions.

Under the Local Government Act 1894, Rural Sanitary Districts became Rural Districts from 28 December 1894, and rural sanitary districts which straddled county boundaries were to be split so that separate rural districts were created for the parts in each county. Generally, the Huntingdonshire part of the St Neots Rural Sanitary District became the St Neots Rural District, whilst the Bedfordshire part became the Eaton Socon Rural District. As an exception to this rule, the Bedfordshire and Huntingdonshire County Councils agreed that the parish of Swineshead, despite being in Huntingdonshire, would be included in the Eaton Socon Rural District as it was surrounded by Bedfordshire parishes. Similarly, the parish of Tilbrook in Bedfordshire was included in the St Neots Rural District as it formed a long salient sticking out from Bedfordshire into territory almost surrounded by Huntingdonshire. The county boundary was changed two years later to match the boundary which had been agreed for the Rural Districts, with Swineshead becoming part of Bedfordshire and Tilbrook part of Huntingdonshire on 30 September 1896.

St Neots Rural District was expanded in 1935 by taking in Covington parish from the disbanded Thrapston Rural District.

In 1965 Huntingdonshire and the Soke of Peterborough merged to form Huntingdon and Peterborough.

In 1974 the district was abolished under the Local Government Act 1972 and became part of the non-metropolitan district of Huntingdon, subsequently renamed Huntingdonshire. A small area was transferred to Bedfordshire.

== Parishes ==
Parish	From	To	Notes
Abbotsley			
Buckden			
Catworth			
Covington	1935		Previously in Thrapston RD
Diddington			
Eynesbury Hardwicke			From 1894-1895 part of a single Eynesbury parish. Includes a part detached from the rest of the district
Grafham			
Great Gransden			
Great Paxton			
Great Staughton			
Hail Weston			
Kimbolton			
Little Paxton			
Midloe		1935	See Southoe and Midloe
Offord Cluny			
Offord D'Arcy			
Perry			
Southoe and Midloe	1935		Merger of Southoe & Midloe
Southoe		1935	
St Neots Rural			From 1894-1895 part of a single St Neots parish
Stow Longa			
Tetworth			
Tilbrook			In Bedfordshire until 30 September 1896.
Toseland			
Waresley			
Yelling			
