= Tilbrook =

Village in Cambridgeshire, England

Coordinates: 52.313°N 0.423°W

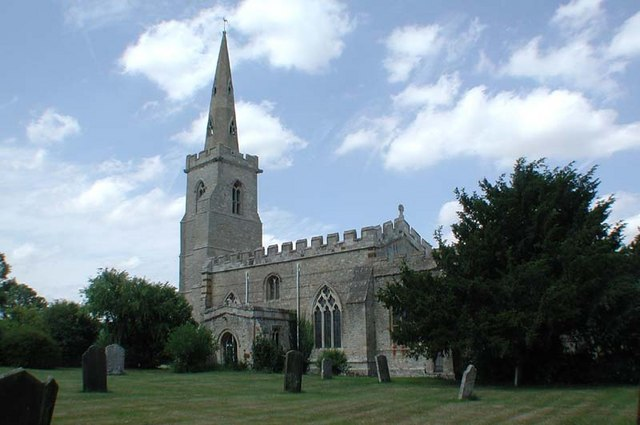
- All Saints

- Location within Cambridgeshire
- Population: 256 (2021)
- OS grid reference: TL079680
- District: Huntingdonshire
- Shire county: Cambridgeshire
- Region: East
- Country: England
- Sovereign state: United Kingdom
- Post town: Huntingdon
- Postcode district: PE28
- Dialling code: 01480
- Police: Cambridgeshire
- Fire: Cambridgeshire
- Ambulance: East of England
- UK Parliament: Huntingdon

Tilbrook is a village and civil parish in the Huntingdonshire district of Cambridgeshire, England, approximately 10 miles (16 km) west of Huntingdon and 24 miles (39 km) north-west of Cambridge. Though administered as part of Cambridgeshire, the village historically belonged to Bedfordshire, being situated 12 miles (19 km) north of Bedford. The parish had a population of 256 in 2021.

== Government ==
As a civil parish, Tilbrook has a parish council. The parish council is elected by the residents of the parish who have registered on the electoral roll; the parish council is the lowest tier of government in England. A parish council is responsible for providing and maintaining a variety of local services including allotments and a cemetery; grass cutting and tree planting within public open spaces such as a village green or playing fields. The parish council reviews all planning applications that might affect the parish and makes recommendations to Huntingdonshire District Council, which is the local planning authority for the parish. The parish council also represents the views of the parish on issues such as local transport, policing and the environment. The parish council raises its own tax to pay for these services, known as the parish precept, which is collected as part of the Council Tax.

Tilbrook was in Bedfordshire until 30 September 1896, when it was transferred to Huntingdonshire. From 1965, the village was part of the new administrative county of Huntingdon and Peterborough. Then in 1974, following the Local Government Act 1972, Tilbrook became a part of the county of Cambridgeshire.

The second tier of local government is Huntingdonshire District Council which is a non-metropolitan district of Cambridgeshire and has its headquarters in Huntingdon. Huntingdonshire District Council has 52 councillors representing 29 district wards. Huntingdonshire District Council collects the council tax, and provides services such as building regulations, local planning, environmental health, leisure and tourism. Tilbrook is a part of the district ward of Kimbolton and Staughton and is represented on the district council by one councillor. District councillors serve for four-year terms following elections to Huntingdonshire District Council.

For Tilbrook the highest tier of local government is Cambridgeshire County Council which has administration buildings in Cambridge. The county council provides county-wide services such as major road infrastructure, fire and rescue, education, social services, libraries and heritage services. Cambridgeshire County Council consists of 69 councillors representing 60 electoral divisions. Tilbrook is part of the electoral division of Brampton and Kimbolton and is represented on the county council by one councillor.

At Westminster Tilbrook is in the parliamentary constituency of Huntingdon, and elects one Member of Parliament (MP) by the first past the post system of election. Tilbrook is represented in the House of Commons by Jonathan Djanogly (Conservative). Jonathan Djanogly has represented the constituency since 2001. The previous member of parliament was John Major (Conservative) who represented the constituency between 1983 and 2001.

== Demography ==
=== Population ===
In the period 1801 to 1901 the population of Tilbrook was recorded every ten years by the UK census. During this time the population was in the range of 219 (the lowest was in 1801) and 392 (the highest was in 1881).

From 1901, a census was taken every ten years with the exception of 1941 (due to the Second World War). The population at the 2011 census included Covington and was recorded as being 370.

Parish	1911	1921	1931	1951	1961	1971	1981	1991	2001	2011
Tilbrook	256	192	202	208	234	219	189	254	254	370

All population census figures from report Historic Census figures Cambridgeshire to 2011 by Cambridgeshire Insight.

In 2011, the parish covered an area of 1,678 acres (679 hectares) and the population density of Tilbrook in 2011 was 97.3 persons per square mile (37.6 per square kilometre).
