= Pidley =

Village in Cambridgeshire, England

Coordinates: 52.38°N 0.05°W

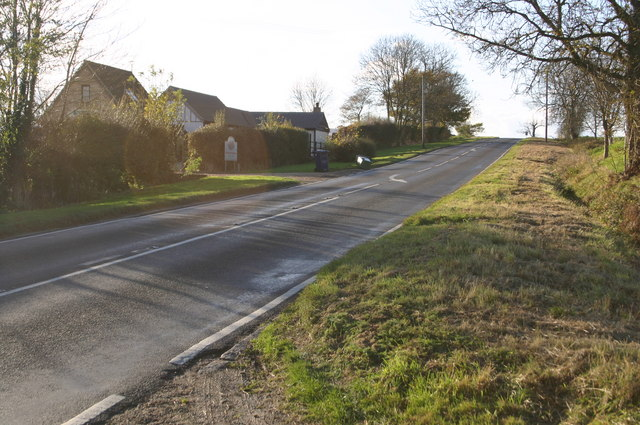
- Pidley Hill

- Location within Cambridgeshire
- Population: 388 (2011)
- OS grid reference: TL327779
- District: Huntingdonshire
- Shire county: Cambridgeshire
- Region: East
- Country: England
- Sovereign state: United Kingdom
- Post town: Huntingdon
- Postcode district: PE28
- Dialling code: 01487
- Police: Cambridgeshire
- Fire: Cambridgeshire
- Ambulance: East of England
- UK Parliament: North West Cambridgeshire

Pidley is a small village in Cambridgeshire, England. Pidley lies approximately 7 miles (11 km) north-east of Huntingdon. Together with the neighbouring village of Fenton, Pidley forms the civil parish of Pidley cum Fenton. Pidley is situated within Huntingdonshire which is a non-metropolitan district of Cambridgeshire as well as being a historic county of England.

The name of the village originally meant "Woodland clearing of a man called Pyda".

== History ==
The village of Pidley has formed a single parish with that of neighbouring Fenton throughout its history. Together they were known as Pidele et Fenton in the 13th century, and Pidley has been variously listed as Pidel, Puddele, and Pydele during medieval times. The manor was held by Ely Abbey until the Dissolution of the Monasteries and passed to the Bishop of Ely. The land rises from about 3 ft. above the ordnance datum in Warboys Fen in the north to over 100 ft. in the middle and south parts of the parish.

== Government ==
Pidley is part of the civil parish of Pidley cum Fenton, which has a parish council. The parish council is elected by the residents of the parish who have registered on the electoral roll; the parish council is the lowest tier of government in England. A parish council is responsible for providing and maintaining a variety of local services including allotments and a cemetery; grass cutting and tree planting within public open spaces such as a village green or playing fields. The parish council reviews all planning applications that might affect the parish and makes recommendations to Huntingdonshire District Council, which is the local planning authority for the parish. The parish council also represents the views of the parish on issues such as local transport, policing and the environment. The parish council raises its own tax to pay for these services, known as the parish precept, which is collected as part of the Council Tax. The parish council comprises seven elected councillors and a parish clerk.

Pidley was in the historic and administrative county of Huntingdonshire until 1965. From 1965, the village was part of the new administrative county of Huntingdon and Peterborough. Then in 1974, following the Local Government Act 1972, Pidley became a part of the county of Cambridgeshire.

The second tier of local government is Huntingdonshire District Council which is a non-metropolitan district of Cambridgeshire and has its headquarters in Huntingdon. Huntingdonshire District Council has 52 councillors representing 29 district wards. Huntingdonshire District Council collects the council tax, and provides services such as building regulations, local planning, environmental health, leisure and tourism. Pidley is a part of the district ward of Somersham and is represented on the district council by two councillors. District councillors serve for four-year terms following elections to Huntingdonshire District Council.

For Pidley the highest tier of local government is Cambridgeshire County Council which has administration buildings in Cambridge. The county council provides county-wide services such as major road infrastructure, fire and rescue, education, social services, libraries and heritage services. Cambridgeshire County Council consists of 69 councillors representing 60 electoral divisions. Pidley is part of the electoral division of Somersham and Earith and is represented on the county council by one councillor.

At Westminster Pidley is in the parliamentary constituency of North West Cambridgeshire, and elects one Member of Parliament (MP) by the first past the post system of election. Pidley is represented in the House of Commons by Shailesh Vara (Conservative). Shailesh Vara has represented the constituency since 2005. The previous member of parliament was Brian Mawhinney (Conservative) who represented the constituency between 1997 and 2005.

== Demography ==
=== Population ===
In the period 1801 to 1901 the population of Pidley-cum-Fenton was recorded every ten years by the UK census. During this time the population was in the range of 264 (the lowest was in 1801) and 587 (the highest was in 1871).

From 1901, a census was taken every ten years with the exception of 1941 (due to the Second World War).

Pidley-cum-Fenton parish population
1911	1921	1931	1951	1961	1971	1981	1991	2001	2011
366	426	555	399	376	317	321	337	367	388

All population census figures from report Historic Census figures Cambridgeshire to 2011 by Cambridgeshire Insight.

In 2011, the parish covered an area of 3,563 acres (1,442 hectares) and the population density of Pidley-cum-Fenton in 2011 was 69.7 persons per square mile (26.9 per square kilometre).

== Culture and community ==
The village has one public house, The Mad Cat.

Pidley is also home to the Pidley Mountain Rescue Team, a charity which does not actually carry out mountain rescue (the area is one of the flattest in the country), but raises money for people with disabilities.

== Religious sites ==
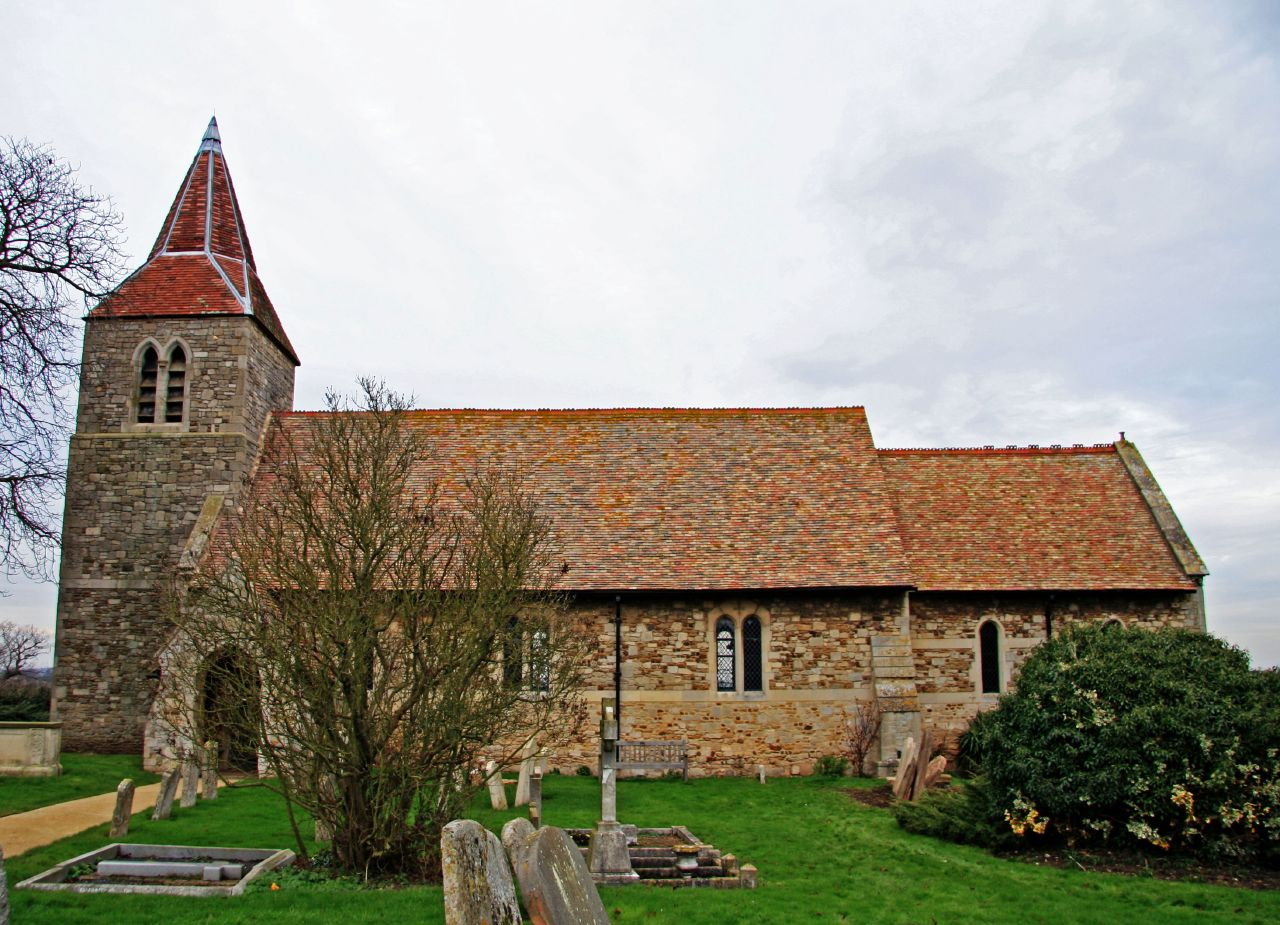
All Saints’ Church

The medieval parish church of All Saints stood on the site of the present church between at least the 12th century until it was pulled down in 1863. The Victorian replacement was constructed between 1864 and 1865 using much of the original stone for the facing, and has a west tower with spire. The only features surviving from the original church are a 14th-century window reset in the vestry, and a circular sundial in the north wall.
