= Covington, Cambridgeshire =

Village and civil parish in England

Coordinates: 52.33°N 0.45°W

Covington
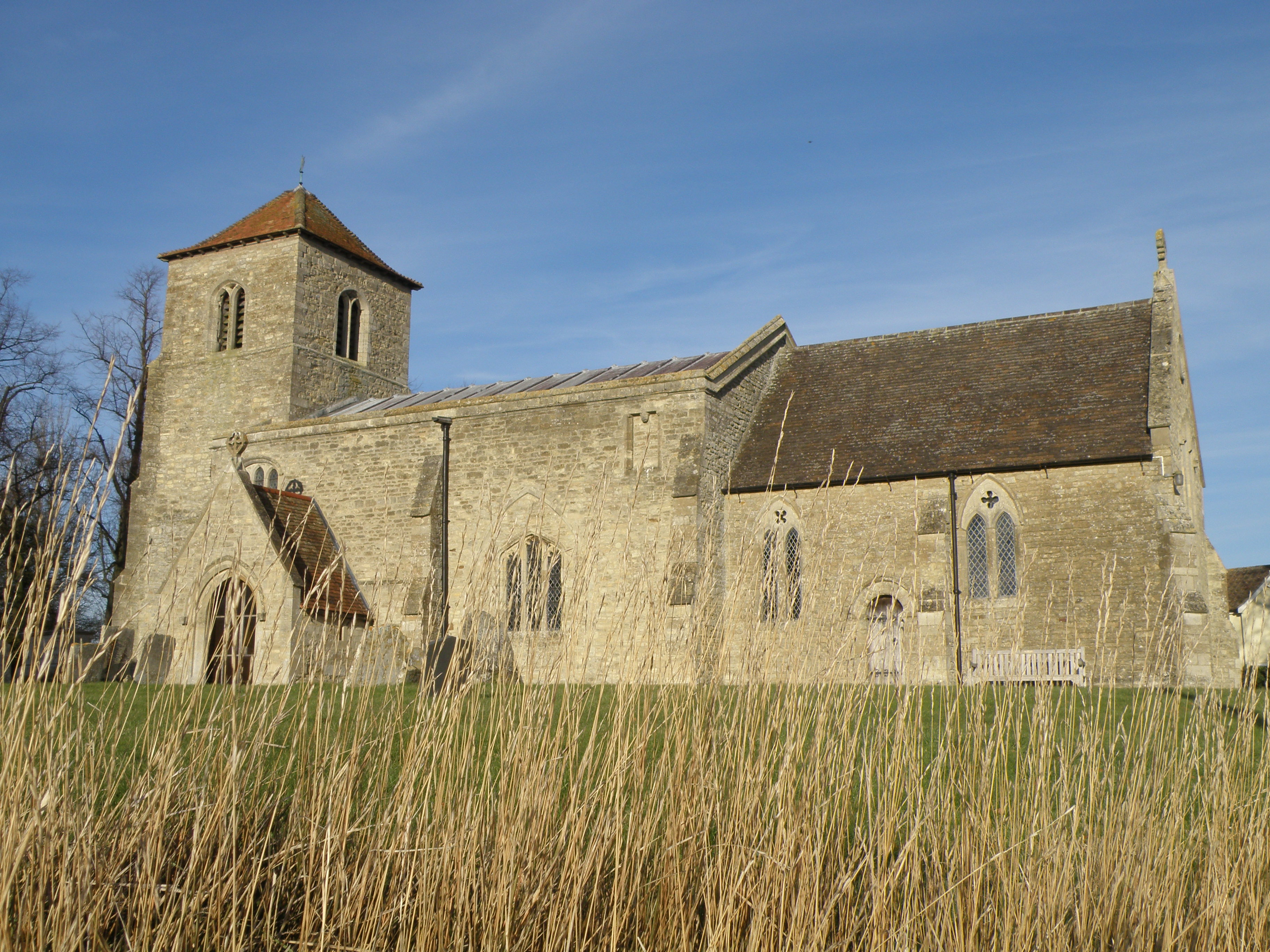
- Covington Church

- Location within Cambridgeshire
- OS grid reference: TL056717
  - London: 58 miles (93 km)
- District: Huntingdonshire
- Shire county: Cambridgeshire
- Region: East
- Country: England
- Sovereign state: United Kingdom
- Post town: Huntingdon
- Postcode district: PE28
- Dialling code: 01480
- Police: Cambridgeshire
- Fire: Cambridgeshire
- Ambulance: East of England
- UK Parliament: Huntingdon

Covington is a village and civil parish in Cambridgeshire, England. Covington lies approximately 10 miles (16 km) west of Huntingdon near to Catworth and close to the county borders with both Bedfordshire and Northamptonshire. Covington is situated within Huntingdonshire which is a non-metropolitan district of Cambridgeshire as well as being a historic county of England. Covington (OE:Copp-ing-tun – The High Pasture Enclosures). The civil parish covers an area of 1,294 acres (524 hectares). At the 2011 Census the population of the village was found to be less than 100 and was included in the civil parish of Tilbrook.

== History ==
In 1085 William the Conqueror ordered that a survey should be carried out across his kingdom to discover who owned which parts and what it was worth. The survey took place in 1086 and the results were recorded in what, since the 12th century, has become known as the Domesday Book. Starting with the king himself, for each landholder within a county there is a list of their estates or manors; and, for each manor, there is a summary of the resources of the manor, the amount of annual rent that was collected by the lord of the manor both in 1066 and in 1086, together with the taxable value.

Covington was listed in the Domesday Book in the Hundred of Leightonstone in Huntingdonshire; the name of the settlement was written as Covintune in the Domesday Book. In 1086 there was just one manor at Covington; the annual rent paid to the lord of the manor in 1066 had been £8 and the rent had increased to £10 in 1086.

The Domesday Book does not explicitly detail the population of a place but it records that there were 18 households at Covington. There is no consensus about the average size of a household at that time; estimates range from 3.5 to 5.0 people per household. Using these figures then an estimate of the population of Covington in 1086 is that it was within the range of 63 and 90 people.

The Domesday Book uses a number of units of measure for areas of land that are now unfamiliar terms, such as hides and ploughlands. In different parts of the country, these were terms for the area of land that a team of eight oxen could plough in a single season and are equivalent to 120 acres (49 hectares); this was the amount of land that was considered to be sufficient to support a single family. By 1086, the hide had become a unit of tax assessment rather than an actual land area; a hide was the amount of land that could be assessed as £1 for tax purposes. The survey records that there were 13 ploughlands at Covington in 1086. In addition to the arable land, there was 48 acres (19 hectares) of meadows at Covington.

The tax assessment in the Domesday Book was known as geld or danegeld and was a type of land-tax based on the hide or ploughland. It was originally a way of collecting a tribute to pay off the Danes when they attacked England, and was only levied when necessary. Following the Norman Conquest, the geld was used to raise money for the King and to pay for continental wars; by 1130, the geld was being collected annually. Having determined the value of a manor's land and other assets, a tax of so many shillings and pence per pound of value would be levied on the land holder. While this was typically two shillings in the pound the amount did vary; for example, in 1084 it was as high as six shillings in the pound. For the manor at Covington the total tax assessed was 8.5 geld.

In 1086 there was no church at Covington.

The inclosure of open fields took place in 1801.

== Governance ==
Covington does not have a parish council but holds an annual parish meeting.

Covington was in the historic and administrative county of Huntingdonshire until 1965. From 1965, the village was part of the new administrative county of Huntingdon and Peterborough. Then in 1974, following the Local Government Act 1972, Covington became a part of the county of Cambridgeshire.

The second tier of local government is Huntingdonshire District Council which is a non-metropolitan district of Cambridgeshire and has its headquarters in Huntingdon. Huntingdonshire District Council has 52 councillors representing 29 district wards. Huntingdonshire District Council collects the council tax, and provides services such as building regulations, local planning, environmental health, leisure and tourism. Covington is a part of the district ward of Kimbolton and Staughton and is represented on the district council by one councillor. District councillors serve for four-year terms following elections to Huntingdonshire District Council.

For Covington the highest tier of local government is Cambridgeshire County Council which has administration buildings in Cambridge. The county council provides county-wide services such as major road infrastructure, fire and rescue, education, social services, libraries and heritage services. Cambridgeshire County Council consists of 69 councillors representing 60 electoral divisions. Covington is part of the electoral division of Brampton and Kimbolton and is represented on the county council by one councillor.

At Westminster Covington is in the parliamentary constituency of Huntingdon, and elects one Member of Parliament (MP) by the first past the post system of election. Covington is represented in the House of Commons by Jonathan Djanogly (Conservative). Jonathan Djanogly has represented the constituency since 2001. The previous member of parliament was John Major (Conservative) who represented the constituency between 1983 and 2001.

== Geography ==
The village and parish lies on a bedrock of Oxford clay from the Jurassic period The land in the north of the parish is characterised as Oadby Member Diamicton, from the Quaternary period, with rocks formed during Ice Age conditions by glaciers scouring the land.

The village lies between 140 feet (43 m) and 260 feet (79 m) above sea level. Most of the village is on the south side of a ridge, overlooking the valley of the river Kym. Covington is about 2 miles (3.2 km) to the south of Junction 16 of the A14 road that runs from the Port of Felixstowe to the Catthorpe Interchange, Leicestershire.

== Demography ==
The population of Covington between 1801 and 1901 ranged from 104 to 162.

Village	1911	1921	1931	1951	1961	1991	2001	2011
Covington	113	109	82	90	92	83	90	120

Census: Covington 1801–1961 Census: Covington 1951, 1971, 1991 Population Estimates: Covington 2001–2011

== Culture and Community ==
The former Victorian school house which was built in 1876 closed in 1920; it is now used as the Village Hall. The thatched 17th Century Red Cow ale house closed as a public house in 1989; it is now a private residence.

== Landmarks ==
=== Boring Field ===
The highest point of the historic county of Huntingdonshire, known as Boring Field, is within the Parish, although the ground continues to rise as it goes into Northamptonshire. The high point some 80 metres (260 ft) above sea level is located at TL04937127, and is the lowest county top of the historic counties of England. Visiting this lowest historic county top, near Three Shires farm, is of interest to participants in the sport of Hill bagging and Highpointing.

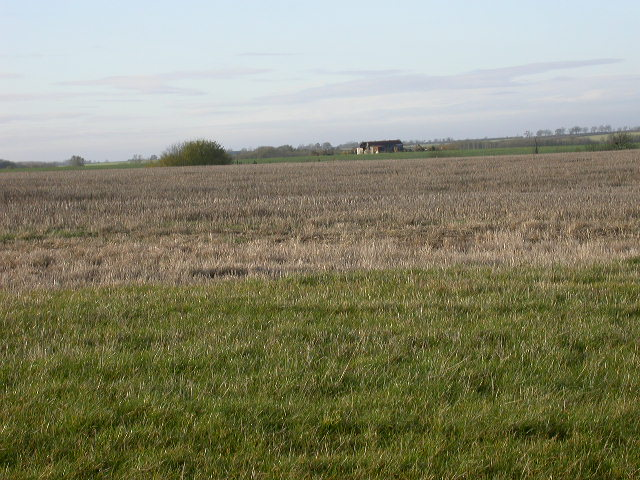
A view across Boring Field

== Transport ==
Just to the north of the village, a railway line from Kettering to Huntingdon was built in 1866 and rail services were run between Kettering and Cambridge from 1882 until 1959, after which the railway was dismantled. The Three Shires Way, a long-distance path from Grafham Water to Salcey Forest, passes through Covington.

== Religious Sites ==
The Anglican church at Covington is dedicated to All Saints and is a Grade II listed building. The church is in the deanery of Huntingdon in the diocese of Ely. There was no mention of a church in Covington in the Domesday Book, but by the end of the 12th Century a stone church had been built on the present site. The chancel was built c.1300 and the tower was added in the 14th century and altered c.1500. The church was restored in 1882–3. It is possible that the church was originally dedicated to St Margaret and subsequently dedicated to All Saints. In 2014 the original three bells in the church tower were restored and re-hung; a fourth bell was added.
