= Winwick, Cambridgeshire =

Village in Cambridgeshire, England

Coordinates: 52.41°N 0.38°W

Winwick
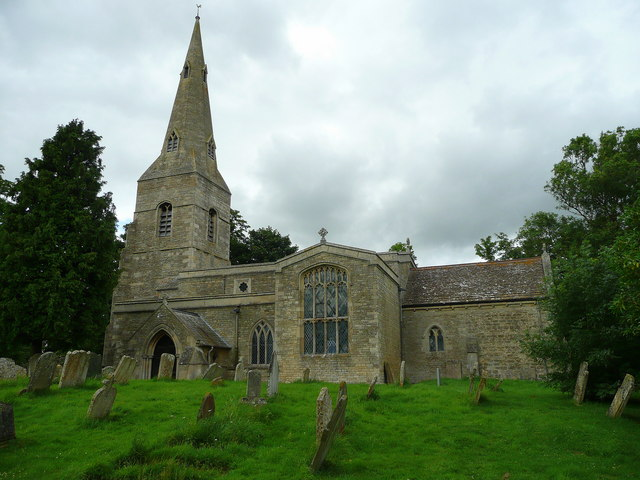
- Church of All Saints

- Location within Cambridgeshire
- Population: 202 (2011)
- OS grid reference: TL101803
- Civil parish: Winwick
- District: Huntingdonshire
- Shire county: Cambridgeshire
- Region: East
- Country: England
- Sovereign state: United Kingdom
- Post town: HUNTINGDON
- Postcode district: PE28
- Dialling code: 01832
- Police: Cambridgeshire
- Fire: Cambridgeshire
- Ambulance: East of England
- UK Parliament: North West Cambridgeshire

Winwick is a village and civil parish in Cambridgeshire, England. Winwick lies approximately 10 miles (16 km) north-west of Huntingdon. It is a crossroads village on the B660 near Hamerton. Winwick is situated within Huntingdonshire which is a non-metropolitan district of Cambridgeshire as well as being a historic county of England.

The meaning of the name Winwick contains two separate elements, ‘Win’ and ‘wic’. ‘Win’ refers to a personal name and ‘wic’ means a dwelling. Combining these elements gives the full meaning of Winwick which is Wina's specialised farm. According to the 2011 census, the total population (including Hamerton) is 202.

Winwick contains 'All Saints' church and 'Veazey Coaches Limited', a family run coach hire company that has been running since 1978. The coach company takes children who live in Winwick to school in Great Gidding.

In the 1870s, Winwick was described as:

"WINWICK, a parish in the district of Oundle and counties of Huntingdon and Northampton; 4½ miles SE by E of Barnwell r. station, and 6½ SE by S of Oundle. Post town, Oundle. Acres, 1,710. Real property, £1,813. Pop., 380. Houses, 82. The property is much subdivided. The living is a vicarage in the diocese of Ely. Value, £90.* Patron, the Duke of Buccleuch. The church was restored in 1865. Charities, £18."

== History ==
In 1085 William the Conqueror ordered that a survey should be carried out across his kingdom to discover who owned which parts and what it was worth. The survey took place in 1086 and the results were recorded in what, since the 12th century, has become known as the Domesday Book. Starting with the king himself, for each landholder within a county there is a list of their estates or manors; and, for each manor, there is a summary of the resources of the manor, the amount of annual rent that was collected by the lord of the manor both in 1066 and in 1086, together with the taxable value.

Winwick was listed in the Domesday Book in the Hundred of Polebrook in Huntingdonshire; the name of the settlement was written as Winewiche in the Domesday Book. In 1086 there were four manors at Winwick; the annual rent paid to the lords of the manors in 1066 had been £4. 75 and the rent had increased to £6.5 in 1086.

The Domesday Book does not explicitly detail the population of a place but it records that there were 23 households at Winwick. There is no consensus about the average size of a household at that time; estimates range from 3.5 to 5.0 people per household. Using these figures then an estimate of the population of Winwick in 1086 is that it was within the range of 80 and 115 people.

The Domesday Book uses a number of units of measure for areas of land that are now unfamiliar terms, such as hides and ploughlands. In different parts of the country, these were terms for the area of land that a team of eight oxen could plough in a single season and are equivalent to 120 acres (49 hectares); this was the amount of land that was considered to be sufficient to support a single family. By 1086, the hide had become a unit of tax assessment rather than an actual land area; a hide was the amount of land that could be assessed as £1 for tax purposes. The survey records that there were fourteen ploughlands at Winwick in 1086. In addition to the arable land, there was 23 acres (9 hectares) of meadows at Winwick.

The tax assessment in the Domesday Book was known as geld or danegeld and was a type of land-tax based on the hide or ploughland. It was originally a way of collecting a tribute to pay off the Danes when they attacked England, and was only levied when necessary. Following the Norman Conquest, the geld was used to raise money for the King and to pay for continental wars; by 1130, the geld was being collected annually. Having determined the value of a manor's land and other assets, a tax of so many shillings and pence per pound of value would be levied on the land holder. While this was typically two shillings in the pound the amount did vary; for example, in 1084 it was as high as six shillings in the pound. For the manors at Winwick the total tax assessed was six geld.

In 1086 there was no church at Winwick.

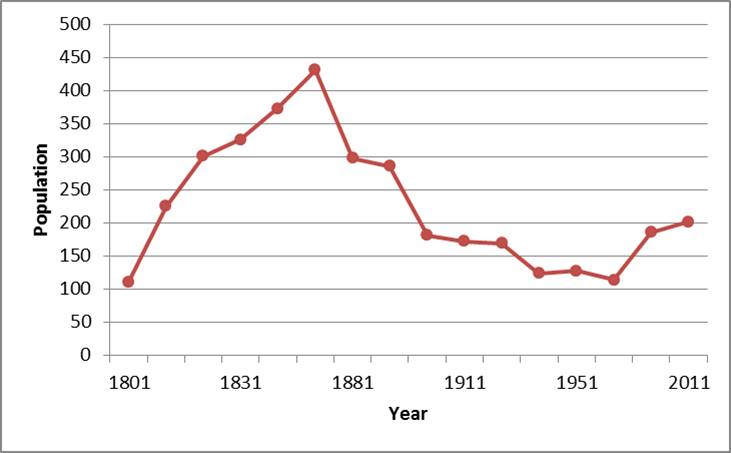
Total population of Winwick, Cambridgeshire, from 1801 to 2011, as reported by census data.

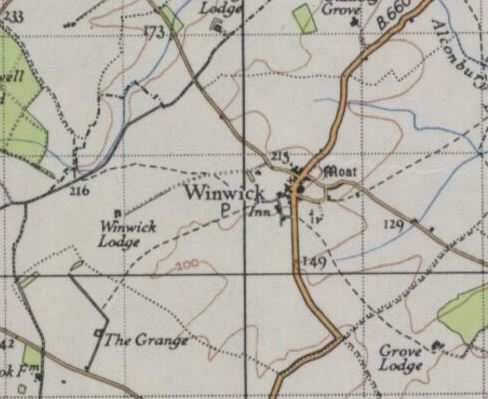
Historical Map From the 20th Century Showing the Parish of Winwick

Currently Winwick is within the district of Huntingdonshire however, until 1895 it was in two separate districts, Huntingdonshire and Northamptonshire. Moreover, the parish church of All Saints was in Northamptonshire. During the 1800s, the village was growing in size as the population reached 431 people in 1851 however, this is considerably larger than the present population of the village at only 202 people. Back in 1546, the plague claimed 40 lives between March and April including that of the vicar.

During the 1800s,

"the village existed to service drovers as there were springs there and there used to be a few pubs". However, these pubs are no longer present within the village.

It has been said that;

"There was a great fire which burnt down much of the village in around 1910" Edwardian era. The houses were thatched which meant that the fire spread through the village easily.

== Government ==
Winwick is a small parish and has a parish meeting rather than a parish council.

Winwick was entirely in the historic and administrative county of Huntingdonshire from 1895 until 1965. From 1965, the village was part of the new administrative county of Huntingdon and Peterborough. Then in 1974, following the Local Government Act 1972, Winwick became a part of the county of Cambridgeshire.

The second tier of local government is Huntingdonshire District Council which is a non-metropolitan district of Cambridgeshire and has its headquarters in Huntingdon. Huntingdonshire District Council has 52 councillors representing 29 district wards. Huntingdonshire District Council collects the council tax, and provides services such as building regulations, local planning, environmental health, leisure and tourism. Winwick is a part of the district ward of Sawtry and is represented on the district council by two councillors. District councillors serve for four year terms following elections to Huntingdonshire District Council.

For Winwick the highest tier of local government is Cambridgeshire County Council which has administration buildings in Cambridge. The county council provides county-wide services such as major road infrastructure, fire and rescue, education, social services, libraries and heritage services. Cambridgeshire County Council consists of 69 councillors representing 60 electoral divisions. Winwick is part of the electoral division of Sawtry and Ellington and is represented on the county council by one councillor.

At Westminster Winwick is in the parliamentary constituency of North West Cambridgeshire, and elects one Member of Parliament (MP) by the first past the post system of election. Winwick is represented in the House of Commons by Shailesh Vara (Conservative). Shailesh Vara has represented the constituency since 2005. The previous member of parliament was Brian Mawhinney (Conservative) who represented the constituency between 1997 and 2005.

== Demography ==
=== Population ===
In the period 1801 to 1901 the population of Winwick was recorded every ten years by the UK census. During this time the population was in the range of 110 (the lowest was in 1801) and 431 (the highest was in 1851).

From 1901, a census was taken every ten years with the exception of 1941 (due to the Second World War).

Parish	1911	1921	1931	1951	1961	1971	1981	1991	2001	2011
Winwick	172	169	124	128	114	91	94	91	98	90

All population census figures from report Historic Census figures Cambridgeshire to 2011 by Cambridgeshire Insight.

In 2011, the parish covered an area of 1,712 acres (693 hectares) and the population density of Winwick in 2011 was 33.6 persons per square mile (13 per square kilometre).

== Religious sites ==
All Saints Church is a Church of England church that has been a place of Christian worship for around 800 year. There is no evidence of All Saints Church in the Domesday book however the stone work dates back to the 12th century. The church is made from rubble with a lead and stone slate roof. Although the church has undertaken several restorations since the 13th century, it was declared a grade II listed building on 28 January 1958. Some features of the church that were repaired are; the chancel, nave, south aisle and chancel arch. The most recent restoration occurred in 1935, when the spire was struck by lightning. According to the 2011 census data, 67.8% of the Winwick residents classed themselves as a Christian, which is higher than the England percentage of 59.4%, and 24.3% classed themselves as having no religion.

== Employment ==
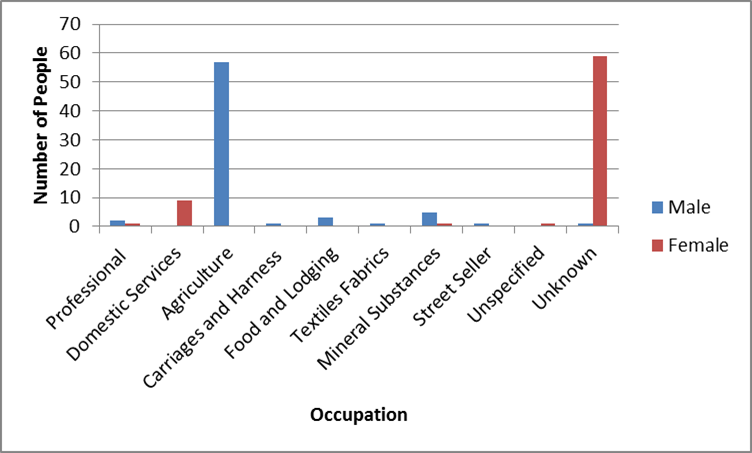
Occupation of male and female residents of Winwick in 1881, according to Census data.

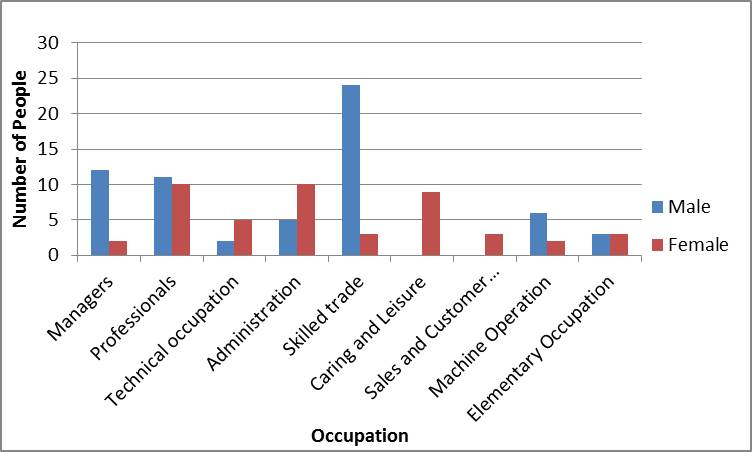
Occupation of male and female residents of Winwick, according to 2011 Census data.

=== Historical Occupations ===
In 1881, the occupation of men and women varied considerably. Men were employed in the primary sector with a main focus on agriculture. There were 57 men working in agriculture in comparison to 0 women. However, unlike men, the occupation of most women was unknown. The few women that had recorded employment were mainly in domestic services.

=== Current Occupations ===
According to the 2011 census report, there is a more evenly spread set of occupations between males and females. Only 110 people in Winwick have jobs. For men, the main job type is skilled trade, which can include builders, plumbers and electricians. For women though, the occupation type has changed drastically since 1881. In 2011, there were 10 women in administration and 10 women professionals, both these jobs are more skilled than the domestic services that was dominant in 1881.

== Culture and community ==
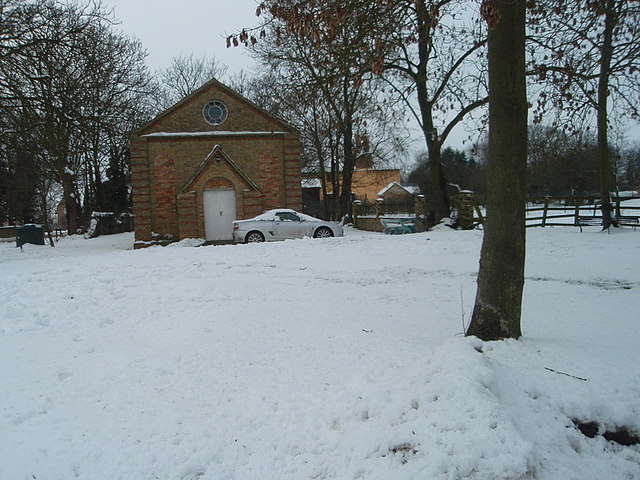
Snow covered Village Hall in Winwick

According to the 2011 census data, 11 residents of Winwick have a second home within the UK. The Old Vicarage was sold in 2015; this was the first time the house had been available on the open market. Additionally there used to be a windmill off Thurning Road; however, it was knocked down. Within the village there is also a farm called 'Woodwards Farm' which rears, makes and sells its own produce. The farm supplies local villages and businesses.
