= Old Weston =

Village in Cambridgeshire, England

Coordinates: 52.384°N 0.386°W

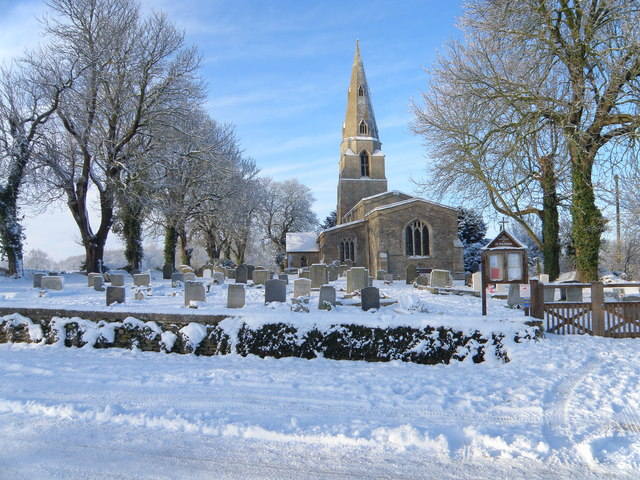
- St Swithin's Church in winter

- Location within Cambridgeshire
- Population: 250 (2011 Census)
- OS grid reference: TL101756
  - London: 144 km (89 mi)
- Civil parish: Old Weston
- District: Huntingdonshire
- Shire county: Cambridgeshire
- Region: East
- Country: England
- Sovereign state: United Kingdom
- Post town: HUNTINGDON
- Postcode district: PE28
- Dialling code: 01480
- Police: Cambridgeshire
- Fire: Cambridgeshire
- Ambulance: East of England
- UK Parliament: Huntingdon

Old Weston – in Huntingdonshire (now part of Cambridgeshire), England – is a village near Molesworth west of Huntingdon.

In 1870–1872, John Wilson, who was a writer for the "Imperial Gazetteer of England and Wales:" describes the area as, "a parish, with a scattered village, in the district of Thrapston and county of Huntingdon; 8 miles N of Kimbolton r. station. It has a post-office under St. Neots. Acres, 2,012. Real property, £2,364. Pop., 426. Houses, 93. The property is much sub-divided. The living is a p. curacy, annexed to Brington. The church is ancient but good, and has a tower and spire. There are a Wesleyan chapel and a national school." According to the 2011 UK population census, the parish of Old Weston had a population of 250 people.

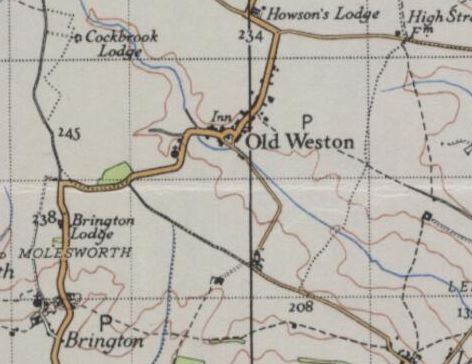
Old Weston map from the 20th century

== History ==
In about 958 King Edgar the Peaceful gave Ælfwyn, wife of Æthelstan Half-King, ten hides of land at Old Weston for acting as his foster-mother, and this land later formed part of her son Æthelwine's endowment for the establishment of Ramsey Abbey.

In 1085 William the Conqueror ordered that a survey should be carried out across his kingdom to discover who owned which parts and what it was worth. The survey took place in 1086 and the results were recorded in what, since the 12th century, has become known as the Domesday Book. Starting with the king himself, for each landholder within a county there is a list of their estates or manors; and, for each manor, there is a summary of the resources of the manor, the amount of annual rent that was collected by the lord of the manor both in 1066 and in 1086, together with the taxable value.

Old Weston was listed in the Domesday Book in the Hundred of Leightonstone in Huntingdonshire; the name of the settlement was written as Westune in the Domesday Book. In 1086 there was just one manor at Old Weston; the annual rent paid to the lord of the manor in 1066 had been £10 and the rent was the same in 1086.

The Domesday Book does not explicitly detail the population of a place but it records that there were 22 households at Old Weston. There is no consensus about the average size of a household at that time; estimates range from 3.5 to 5.0 people per household. Using these figures then an estimate of the population of Old Weston in 1086 is that it was within the range of 77 and 110 people.

The Domesday Book uses a number of units of measure for areas of land that are now unfamiliar terms, such as hides and ploughlands. In different parts of the country, these were terms for the area of land that a team of eight oxen could plough in a single season and are equivalent to 120 acres (49 hectares); this was the amount of land that was considered to be sufficient to support a single family. By 1086, the hide had become a unit of tax assessment rather than an actual land area; a hide was the amount of land that could be assessed as £1 for tax purposes. The survey records that there were ploughlands at Old Weston in 1086 and that there was the capacity for a further 4 ploughlands. In addition to the arable land, there was 60 acres (24 hectares) of meadows at Old Weston.

The tax assessment in the Domesday Book was known as geld or danegeld and was a type of land-tax based on the hide or ploughland. It was originally a way of collecting a tribute to pay off the Danes when they attacked England, and was only levied when necessary. Following the Norman Conquest, the geld was used to raise money for the King and to pay for continental wars; by 1130, the geld was being collected annually. Having determined the value of a manor's land and other assets, a tax of so many shillings and pence per pound of value would be levied on the land holder. While this was typically two shillings in the pound the amount did vary; for example, in 1084 it was as high as six shillings in the pound. For the manor at Old Weston the total tax assessed was ten geld.

By 1086 there was already a church and a priest at Old Weston.

Old Weston is a rural village in Huntingdonshire near the Northamptonshire border, with a former World War II airforce base between the parish and the border. The main residency area, is alongside a stream, which flows through Old Weston. The old settlement of Old Weston, before the fire of 1701 which burnt almost all of the cottages, was located on the northern bank of the river, with evidence suggesting that a few of the cottages extended south of the church, located south west of the stream.

== Government ==
As a civil parish, Old Weston has a parish council. The parish council is elected by the residents of the parish who have registered on the electoral roll; the parish council is the lowest tier of government in England. A parish council is responsible for providing and maintaining a variety of local services including allotments and a cemetery; grass cutting and tree planting within public open spaces such as a village green or playing fields. The parish council reviews all planning applications that might affect the parish and makes recommendations to Huntingdonshire District Council, which is the local planning authority for the parish. The parish council also represents the views of the parish on issues such as local transport, policing and the environment. The parish council raises its own tax to pay for these services, known as the parish precept, which is collected as part of the Council Tax. The parish council consists of seven councillors and the parish clerk. The parish council normally meets on the first Tuesday of the month.

Old Weston was in the historic and administrative county of Huntingdonshire until 1965. From 1965, the village was part of the new administrative county of Huntingdon and Peterborough. Then in 1974, following the Local Government Act 1972, Old Weston became a part of the county of Cambridgeshire.

The second tier of local government is Huntingdonshire District Council which is a non-metropolitan district of Cambridgeshire and has its headquarters in Huntingdon. Huntingdonshire District Council has 52 councillors representing 29 district wards. Huntingdonshire District Council collects the council tax, and provides services such as building regulations, local planning, environmental health, leisure and tourism. Old Weston is a part of the district ward of Ellington and is represented on the district council by one councillor. District councillors serve for four-year terms following elections to Huntingdonshire District Council.

For Old Weston the highest tier of local government is Cambridgeshire County Council which has administration buildings in Cambridge. The county council provides county-wide services such as major road infrastructure, fire and rescue, education, social services, libraries and heritage services. Cambridgeshire County Council consists of 69 councillors representing 60 electoral divisions. Old Weston is part of the electoral division of Sawtry and Ellington and is represented on the county council by one councillor.

At Westminster Old Weston is in the parliamentary constituency of North West Cambridgeshire, and elects one Member of Parliament (MP) by the first past the post system of election. Old Weston is represented in the House of Commons by Shailesh Vara (Conservative). Shailesh Vara has represented the constituency since 2005. The previous member of parliament was Brian Mawhinney (Conservative) who represented the constituency between 1997 and 2005.

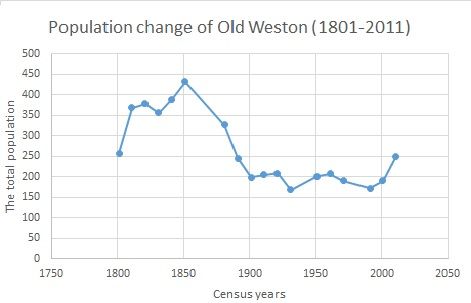
Total population of Old Weston from 1881–2011, as reported from Neighbourhood Statistics and GENUKI

== Population ==
During 1850–1891, the population of Old Weston decreased significantly from 432 people to 245. This decrease in Old Weston can partly be explained from the nearby town expansion of the Huntingdon parish, "St. John", where the population increased 1,057 people in 1841 to 1,579 people in 1891. From 2001–2011, the population of Old Weston increased from 190 people to 250 people. A possible explanation, for this relatively high population increase, can be partly explained from the 2011 "Cambridgeshire parish population census", where it stated that 11 people living in Old Weston were between the age of 0–4, between the two censuses.

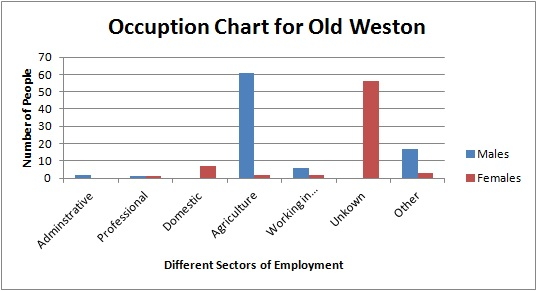
Old Weston work demographic from the 1881 Census

== Economy ==
In 1881, Old Weston's main sector of employment was in the agriculture industry, with the majority of the workforce being made up of males, as the landscape was dominantly rural. A vast number of females were also employed, as indicated by the 1881 UK census, however, the census does not delve into the specific areas of employment, despite 56 women working in "Unknown Occupation". With this stated, the largest, specified sector of employment that women were employed in, which has been titled was "Domestic Services" with seven women working within this industry.

=== Current economy ===
According to the 2011 Census, a total of 137 Old Weston's residents, aged 16–74, were in some kind of employment. The census breaks down the different types of employment into service and manufacturing industries. The main sector of employment for the majority of residents, was that 30 people (21.9% of the total workforce) were either managers, directors or senior officials. The second largest sector of employment that the Office of National Statistics indicates, is that 29 people (21.2%) worked in professional employment, while the lowest number of people employed in Old Weston was "Elementary Occupation", which includes teachers. While the majority of the residents are employed in the service industry, an increasing number of people are working from home, rather than travel to work, reducing congestion on the roads leading to the two main towns of Huntingdon and Kettering, which is connected to the National Rail.

== Culture and community ==
Old Weston's village hall was built in 1962 after the Beeby family donated the land to the local community, to allow for the creation of a village hall, along with a car park and grassland. Since 1991, the village hall has been used to host Old Weston's annual pantomime, performed by "The New Old Weston Thespian Society", during March.The performance provides social and charitable functions.

== Transport ==
The B660 runs through Old Weston, connecting the village to the regional town of Huntingdon, via the A14 which starts from Rugby and ends at Ipswich. This route to the rest of the county allows Old Weston to have a public bus route service provided by the Cambridgeshire County Council which operates within Huntingdon, where it runs Monday to Saturday, with all the buses running through the village being serviced by Whippet Coaches Ltd. In addition to the publicly run bus services organised by the county government, there is also a privately run, community transport service running throughout several parishes in the area. The bus service stops at all the town centres including Peterborough, Huntingdon and Stamford, with the bus service beginning at 0900 and returning at 1330.

== Religious sites ==
St Swithins Church in Old Weston, was named after the Anglo-Saxon bishop, Swithun, whose name means in English "Strong". The church was first recognised in the 1086, Domesday Survey. One of the most interesting features about the historic church is within the congregation hall, original paintings from the 13th century depicting a wheel of fortune, and the beheading of St. John the Baptist. St. Margaret, who is depicted as standing on a dragon while under a canopy and St. Catherine. All of the paintings were discovered in 1895, when the church was undergoing major refurbishment during the 19th century.
