= Huntingdonshire District Council =

Local authority in Cambridgeshire, England

Type
- Type: Non-metropolitan district

Leadership
- Chair: Stephen Ferguson, Green since 21 May 2026
- Leader: Sarah Conboy, Liberal Democrat since 18 May 2022
- Chief Executive: Michelle Sacks since 2023

Structure
- Seats: 52 councillors
- Political groups: Coalition administration (26) Liberal Democrats (22) Independent (4) Other parties (26) Conservative (15) Reform (8) Green (2) Labour (1)

Elections
- Voting system: Plurality-at-large and first-past-the-post
- Last election: 7 May 2026
- Next election: 2027 (TBD)

Meeting place
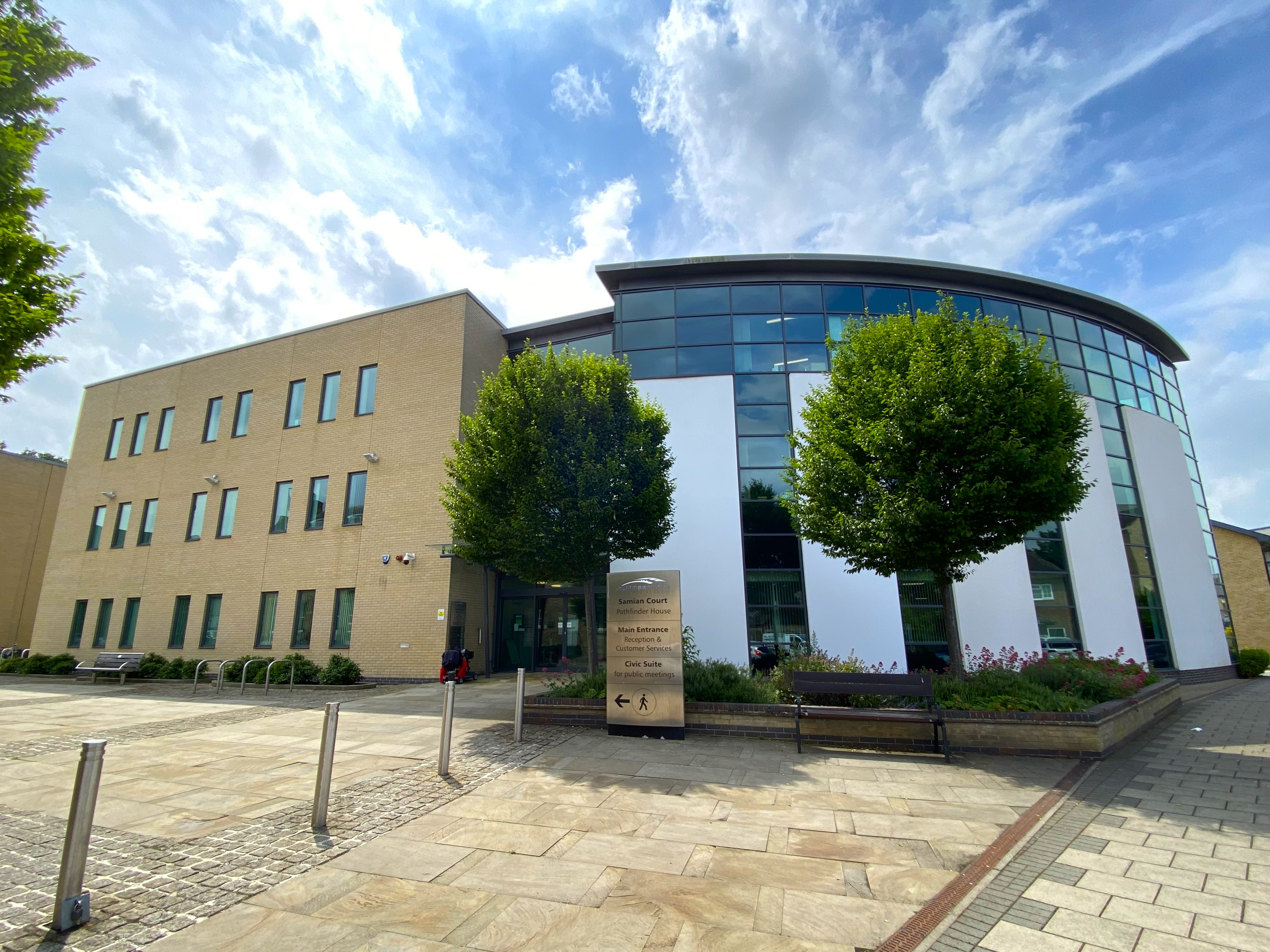
- Pathfinder House, St Mary's Street, Huntingdon, PE29 3TN

Website
- huntingdonshire.gov.uk

Ward map of Huntingdon District Council

Huntingdonshire District Council is the local authority for the district of Huntingdonshire in Cambridgeshire, England. The council is based in the town of Huntingdon. The district also includes the towns of Godmanchester, Ramsey, St Ives and St Neots and surrounding rural areas. The district covers almost the same area as the historic county of Huntingdonshire, which had been abolished for administrative purposes in 1965, with some differences to the northern boundary with Peterborough.

Since 2017 the district has been a constituent member of the Cambridgeshire and Peterborough Combined Authority, led by the directly elected Mayor of Cambridgeshire and Peterborough.

The neighbouring districts are Peterborough, Fenland, East Cambridgeshire, South Cambridgeshire, Central Bedfordshire, Bedford, and North Northamptonshire.

== History ==
The district was formed on 1 April 1974 under the Local Government Act 1972. The new district covered the area of eight former districts, which were all abolished at the same time:

- Huntingdon and Godmanchester Municipal Borough
- Huntingdon Rural District
- Norman Cross Rural District (except parts within the designated area for Peterborough New Town)
- Ramsey Urban District
- St Ives Municipal Borough
- St Ives Rural District
- St Neots Rural District
- St Neots Urban District

These eight districts had constituted the county of Huntingdonshire until 1965 when it had merged with the neighbouring Soke of Peterborough to form the short-lived county of Huntingdon and Peterborough. As part of the 1974 reforms the area became part of an enlarged Cambridgeshire. The new district was initially named Huntingdon after the former county town. The council changed the district's name from Huntingdon to Huntingdonshire in 1984.

== Governance ==
Huntingdonshire District Council provides district-level services. County-level services are provided by Cambridgeshire County Council. The whole district is also covered by civil parishes, which form a third tier of local government.

=== Political control ===
The council has been under no overall control since the 2022 election. Between 2022 and 2026 it was run by a coalition of the Liberal Democrats, Labour, Greens and independent councillors, led by Liberal Democrat councillor Sarah Conboy. Following the 2026 election a similar coalition formed, but this time without Labour. In August 2026, the two Green councillors quit the coalition.

The first election to the council was held in 1973, initially operating as a shadow authority alongside the outgoing authorities until the new arrangements came into effect on 1 April 1974. Political control of the council since 1974 has been as follows:

Party in control	Years
No overall control	1974–1976
Conservative	1976–2022
No overall control	2022–present

=== Leadership ===
The leaders of the council since 2001 have been:

Councillor	Party	From	To
Derek Holley	Conservative	2001	7 Dec 2005
Ian Bates	Conservative	7 Dec 2005	May 2011
Jason Ablewhite	Conservative	18 May 2011	May 2016
Robin Howe	Conservative	18 May 2016	Jul 2017
Graham Bull	Conservative	26 Jul 2017	4 Dec 2019
Ryan Fuller	Conservative	4 Dec 2019	May 2022
Sarah Conboy	Liberal Democrats	18 May 2022	

=== Composition ===
Following the 2026 election and subsequent changes up to July 2026 the composition of the council was:

Party	Seats
Liberal Democrats	22
Conservative	15
Reform	8
Green	2
Labour	1
Independent	4
Total	52

The next election is due in May 2030.

== Elections ==
Since the last boundary changes in 2018 the council has comprised 52 councillors elected from 26 wards. The whole council is elected together every four years.

== Premises ==
The council is based at Pathfinder House on St Mary's Street in the centre of Huntingdon. The current building was completed in 2010, replacing the council's former headquarters of the same name on the site.
