= Huntingdon and Peterborough =

Former county in England

Coordinates: 52.3500°N 0.1833°W

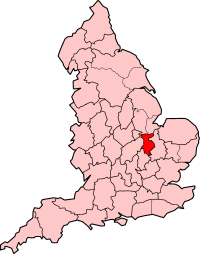
- Population
  - 1971: 202,622
- History
  - Created: 1965
  - Abolished: 1974
  - Succeeded by: Cambridgeshire
- Status: Administrative county
- Government: Huntingdon and Peterborough County Council
  - HQ: Huntingdon
  - Motto: Cor Unum (One Heart)

Huntingdon and Peterborough was a short-lived administrative and geographical county in East Anglia in the United Kingdom. It existed from 1965 to 1974, when it became part of Cambridgeshire.

== Formation ==
The Local Government Act 1888 created four small neighbouring administrative counties in the east of England: Cambridgeshire, Isle of Ely, Huntingdonshire, and the Soke of Peterborough. Following the Second World War, a Local Government Boundary Commission was formed to review county-level administration in England and Wales. The commission was of the opinion that counties needed to have a population of between 200,000 and one million in order to provide effective services. Accordingly, they recommended the amalgamation of all four counties into a single entity. The commission's recommendations were not carried out, however.

The reform of local government was returned to in 1958, with the appointment of a Local Government Commission for England. The four counties were included in the East Midlands General Review Area, and the LGCE made its draft proposals in 1960. The commission identified particular problems in the administration of the Soke of Peterborough, where 80% of the population of the county lay within the City of Peterborough, which was itself seeking county borough status. The LGCE concluded that the Soke was too small to continue as a separate county, and needed to become part of a larger authority. Accordingly, the draft proposals were to combine the Isle of Ely, Huntingdonshire and the Soke of Peterborough with Cambridgeshire (less the City of Cambridge).

There was considerable opposition to the draft proposals, and the LGCE instead opted in its final report in 1961 to create two counties: Huntingdon and Peterborough, and Cambridgeshire and Isle of Ely. The Huntingdon and Peterborough Order was made on 14 February 1964, and placed before the House of Commons on 9 March 1964. The amalgamation was welcomed by David Renton, the member of parliament (MP) for Huntingdonshire, who felt that "The new county will have very good communications and a great community of interest. It will be a compact and convenient local government unit." The order was approved by 143 votes to 83.

The new county was formed on 1 April 1965 from the areas of the administrative counties of Huntingdonshire and Soke of Peterborough (with minor boundary changes) and Thorney Rural District from the Isle of Ely. As well as becoming an administrative county, Huntingdon and Peterborough also became a county for other statutory purposes. Accordingly, the Lord Lieutenant of Huntingdonshire became Lord Lieutenant of Huntingdon and Peterborough, with Peterborough ceasing to be part of the geographical county of Northamptonshire. A high sheriff was also appointed to the new county, and a single commission of peace and court of quarter sessions established.

The county's population, as recorded at the ten-yearly census, was 202,622 in 1971.

=== Emergency services ===
On the creation of the county, an order under the Police Act 1964 came into force creating the Mid-Anglia Constabulary by merging the Cambridge City Police, Cambridgeshire County Constabulary, Isle of Ely Constabulary, Huntingdonshire Constabulary, and the Peterborough Combined Police Force (created in 1947 from the Liberty of Peterborough Constabulary and the Peterborough City Police). On further local government reform in 1974, the present Cambridgeshire Constabulary was formed with the same boundaries.

The Huntingdon and Peterborough Fire Brigade was formed on the same date by the merger of Huntingdonshire Fire Brigade and the Soke of Peterborough Fire Brigade. Since 1974 this has formed part of Cambridgeshire Fire and Rescue Service.

== Districts ==
The county was divided into thirteen local government districts: three municipal boroughs, three urban districts and seven rural districts. Each of these existed as subdivisions of the predecessor counties.

District	Area (acres) 1961	Population 1961
City of Peterborough MB‡	10,023	62,340
Huntingdon and Godmanchester MB†	7,057	8,821
St Ives MB†	2,326	4,082
Old Fletton UD†	3,029	11,677
Ramsey UD†	15,980	5,697
St Neots UD†	1,390	5,554
Barnack RD‡	15,256	4,426
Huntingdon RD†	69,937	12,494
Norman Cross RD†	35,795	8,738
Peterborough RD‡	28,186	7,992
St Ives RD†	45,912	15,358
St Neots RD†	52,559	7,503
Thorney RD¶	22,895	2,159

† Formerly in Huntingdonshire ‡ Formerly in Soke of Peterborough ¶ Formerly in Isle of Ely

Source: Vision of Britain

== Coat of arms ==
Huntingdon and Peterborough County Council was granted armorial bearings by the College of Arms on 3 April 1965. The blazon was as follows:

Barry argent and azure on a fess embattled vert a cornucopia between two garbs or; and for a crest issuant from a mural crown or a demi lion gules gorged with a collar flory counterflory and supporting a staff or, flying therefrom a banner vert charged with two keys in saltire or; mantled azure, doubled argent. And for supporters on the dexter side a pikeman of the New Model Army supporting with the exterior hand a pike, and on the sinister side a mitred abbot in processional vestments for St Peter's Day supporting with the exterior hand a crosier and sudarium all proper. Badge: Two keys in saltire surmounted by a buglehorn or the strings azure interlaced with the keys.

The arms and crest were a combination of the arms previously used by Huntingdonshire and Soke of Peterborough County Councils. To these were added supporters: a pikeman of the New Model Army for the Cromwellian associations of Huntingdonshire, and a mitred abbot for the origins of the Soke as territory administered by Peterborough Abbey.

The Latin motto adopted by the council – Cor Unum, or One Heart – was formerly that of the Soke.

== Abolition ==
The county had only a nine-year existence. In 1974 the Local Government Act 1972 completely reformed administrative structures throughout England and Wales excluding Greater London. A system of metropolitan and non-metropolitan counties, each divided into districts, was introduced. Huntingdon and Peterborough was merged with neighbouring Cambridgeshire and Isle of Ely to form the new enlarged non-metropolitan county (and lieutenancy) of Cambridgeshire, first proposed in 1947. Peterborough and Huntingdon became two of the county's six districts; in 1984, following a resolution of the council, the latter district was renamed Huntingdonshire.

== Legacy ==
There is now a Hunts & Peterborough County Rugby Union that takes all the teams from each area and has representative teams for Youth rugby.

== See also ==
- Lord Lieutenant of Huntingdon and Peterborough
- Peterborough (UK Parliament constituency)
- Huntingdonshire (UK Parliament constituency)
- Local government in Peterborough
- Huntingdonshire local elections
