= Civil parishes in Cambridgeshire =

Subdivisions of Cambridgeshire, England

A map of Cambridgeshire, showing the Districts, clockwise from the top left: Peterborough; Fenland; East Cambridgeshire; South Cambridgeshire; Cambridge; and Huntingdonshire.

A civil parish is a country subdivision, forming the lowest unit of local government in England. There are 264 civil parishes in the ceremonial county of Cambridgeshire, most of the county being parished; Cambridge is completely unparished; Fenland, East Cambridgeshire, South Cambridgeshire and Huntingdonshire are entirely parished. At the 2001 census, there were 497,820 people living in the parishes, accounting for 70.2 per cent of the county's population.

== History ==
Parishes arose from Church of England divisions, and were originally purely ecclesiastical divisions. Over time they acquired civil administration powers.

The Highways Act 1555 made parishes responsible for the upkeep of roads. Every adult inhabitant of the parish was obliged to work four days a year on the roads, providing their own tools, carts and horses; the work was overseen by an unpaid local appointee, the Surveyor of Highways.

The poor were looked after by the monasteries, until their dissolution. In 1572, magistrates were given power to 'survey the poor' and impose taxes for their relief. This system was made more formal by the Poor Law Act 1601, which made parishes responsible for administering the Poor Law; overseers were appointed to charge a rate to support the poor of the parish. The 19th century saw an increase in the responsibility of parishes, although the Poor Law powers were transferred to Poor Law Unions. The Public Health Act 1872 grouped parishes into Rural Sanitary Districts, based on the Poor Law Unions; these subsequently formed the basis for RDs.

Parishes were run by vestries, meeting annually to appoint officials, and were generally identical to ecclesiastical parishes, although some townships in large parishes administered the Poor Law themselves; under the Divided Parishes and Poor Law Amendment Act 1882, all extra-parochial areas and townships that levied a separate rate became independent civil parishes.

Civil parishes in their modern sense date from the Local Government Act 1894, which abolished vestries; established elected parish councils in all rural parishes with more than 300 electors; grouped rural parishes into Rural Districts; and aligned parish boundaries with county and borough boundaries. Urban civil parishes continued to exist, and were generally coterminous with the Urban District, Municipal Borough or County Borough in which they were situated; many large towns contained a number of parishes, and these were usually merged into one. Parish councils were not formed in urban areas, and the only function of the parish was to elect guardians to Poor Law Unions; with the abolition of the Poor Law system in 1930 the parishes had only a nominal existence.

The Local Government Act 1972 retained civil parishes in rural areas, and many former Urban Districts and Municipal Boroughs that were being abolished, were replaced by new successor parishes; urban areas that were considered too large to be single parishes became unparished areas.

== The current position ==
Recent governments have encouraged the formation of town and parish councils in unparished areas, and the Local Government and Rating Act 1997 gave local residents the right to demand the creation of a new civil parish.

A parish council can become a town council unilaterally, simply by resolution; and a civil parish can also gain city status, but only if that is granted by the Crown. The chairman of a town or city council is called a mayor. The Local Government and Public Involvement in Health Act 2007 introduced alternative names: a parish council can now choose to be called a community; village; or neighbourhood council.

Civil parishes with town or city status

== List of civil parishes and unparished areas ==
Image	Name	Status	Popn.	District	Former local authority	Refs
	Cambridge	Unparished area	108,863	Cambridge	Cambridge MB	
	Ashley	Civil parish (ancient)	585	East Cambs	Newmarket; RD	
	Bottisham	Civil parish (ancient)	1,983	East Cambs	Newmarket; RD	
	Brinkley	Civil parish (ancient)	383	East Cambs	Newmarket; RD	
	Burrough Green	Civil parish (ancient)	386	East Cambs	Newmarket; RD	
	Burwell	Civil parish (from c1700)	5,833	East Cambs	Newmarket; RD	
	Cheveley	Civil parish (ancient)	1,912	East Cambs	Newmarket; RD	
	Chippenham	Civil parish (ancient)	528	East Cambs	Newmarket; RD	
	Coveney	Civil parish (ancient)	421	East Cambs	Ely; RD	
	Downham	Civil parish (ancient)	2,409	East Cambs	Ely; RD	
	Dullingham	Civil parish (ancient)	718	East Cambs	Newmarket; RD	
	Ely	City (parish from 1974)	15,102	East Cambs	Ely UD	
	Fordham	Civil parish (ancient)	2,620	East Cambs	Newmarket; RD	
	Haddenham	Civil parish (ancient)	3,228	East Cambs	Ely; RD	
	Isleham	Civil parish (ancient)	2,347	East Cambs	Newmarket; RD	
	Kennett	Civil parish (ancient)	364	East Cambs	Newmarket; RD	
	Kirtling	Civil parish (ancient)	370	East Cambs	Newmarket; RD	
	Littleport	Civil parish (ancient)	7,521	East Cambs	Ely; RD	
	Lode	Civil parish (from 1894)	892	East Cambs	Newmarket; RD	
	Mepal	Civil parish (ancient)	921	East Cambs	Ely; RD	
	Reach	Civil parish (1954, p.cs.)	365	East Cambs	Newmarket; RD	
	Snailwell	Civil parish (ancient)	224	East Cambs	Newmarket; RD	
	Soham	Town (ancient parish)	9,102	East Cambs	Newmarket; RD	
	Stetchworth	Civil parish (ancient)	694	East Cambs	Newmarket; RD	
	Stretham	Civil parish (ancient)	1,685	East Cambs	Ely; RD	
	Sutton	Civil parish (ancient)	3,363	East Cambs	Ely; RD	
	Swaffham Bulbeck	Civil parish (ancient)	853	East Cambs	Newmarket; RD	
	Swaffham Prior	Civil parish (from 1667)	765	East Cambs	Newmarket; RD	
	Thetford	Civil parish (1866, p. ch.)	693	East Cambs	Ely; RD	
	Wentworth	Civil parish (ancient)	159	East Cambs	Ely; RD	
	Westley Waterless	Civil parish (ancient)	155	East Cambs	Newmarket; RD	
	Wicken	Civil parish (ancient)	835	East Cambs	Newmarket; RD	
	Wilburton	Civil parish (ancient)	1,231	East Cambs	Ely; RD	
	Witcham	Civil parish (ancient)	434	East Cambs	Ely; RD	
	Witchford	Civil parish (ancient)	2,344	East Cambs	Ely; RD	
	Woodditton	Civil parish (ancient)	1,789	East Cambs	Newmarket; RD	
	Benwick	Civil parish (1866, p.ch.)	860	Fenland	North Witchford; RD	
	Chatteris	Town (ancient parish)	8,820	Fenland	Chatteris UD	
	Christchurch	Civil parish	719	Fenland	Wisbech; RD	
	Doddington	Civil parish (ancient)	2,088	Fenland	North Witchford; RD	
	Elm	Civil parish (ancient)	3,295	Fenland	Wisbech; RD	
	Gorefield	Civil parish	1,064	Fenland	Wisbech; RD	
	Leverington	Civil parish (ancient)	2,914	Fenland	Wisbech; RD	
	Manea	Civil parish (1866, p.ch.)	1,579	Fenland	North Witchford; RD	
	March	Town (1866, prev. chap.)	19,042	Fenland	March UD	
	Newton-in-the-Isle	Civil parish (ancient)	657	Fenland	Wisbech; RD	
	Parson Drove	Civil parish (1866, p.ch.)	1,030	Fenland	Wisbech; RD	
	Tydd St Giles	Civil parish (ancient)	995	Fenland	Wisbech; RD	
	Whittlesey	Town (parish 1926-74, 81-)	15,581	Fenland	Whittlesey UD	
	Wimblington	Civil parish (1866)	1,656	Fenland	North Witchford; RD	
	Wisbech	Town (ancient parish)	20,200	Fenland	Wisbech MB	
	Wisbech St Mary	Civil parish (prev. chap.)	3,019	Fenland	Wisbech; RD	
	Abbots Ripton	Civil parish (ancient)	309	Huntingdonshire	Huntingdon; RD	
	Abbotsley	Civil parish (ancient)	632	Huntingdonshire	St Neots; RD	
	Alconbury	Civil parish (ancient)	1,670	Huntingdonshire	Huntingdon; RD	
	Alconbury Weston	Civil parish (ancient)	793	Huntingdonshire	Huntingdon; RD	
	Alwalton	Civil parish (ancient)	336	Huntingdonshire	Norman Cross; RD	
	Barham and Woolley	Civil parish (from 1935)	55	Huntingdonshire	Huntingdon; RD	
	Bluntisham	Civil parish (from 1948)	1,976	Huntingdonshire	St Ives; RD	
	Brampton	Civil parish (ancient)	5,030	Huntingdonshire	Huntingdon; RD	
	Brington and Molesworth	Civil parish (from 1935)	412	Huntingdonshire	Huntingdon; RD	
	Broughton	Civil parish (ancient)	241	Huntingdonshire	St Ives; RD	
	Buckden	Civil parish (ancient)	2,515	Huntingdonshire	St Neots; RD	
	Buckworth	Civil parish (ancient)	118	Huntingdonshire	Huntingdon; RD	
	Bury	Civil parish (ancient)	1,713	Huntingdonshire	St Ives; RD	
	Bythorn and Keyston	Civil parish (from 1935)	271	Huntingdonshire	Huntingdon; RD	
	Catworth	Civil parish (from 1885)	366	Huntingdonshire	St Neots; RD	
	Chesterton	Civil parish (ancient)	140	Huntingdonshire	Norman Cross; RD	
	Colne	Civil parish (prev. chap.)	784	Huntingdonshire	St Ives; RD	
	Conington	Civil parish (ancient)	216	Huntingdonshire	Huntingdon; RD	
	Covington	Civil parish (ancient)	85	Huntingdonshire	St Neots; RD	
	Denton and Caldecote	Civil parish (from 1935)	55	Huntingdonshire	Norman Cross; RD	
	Diddington	Civil parish (ancient)	83	Huntingdonshire	St Neots; RD	
	Earith	Civil parish (from 1948)	1,677	Huntingdonshire	St Ives; RD	
	Easton	Civil parish (ancient)	162	Huntingdonshire	Huntingdon; RD	
	Ellington	Civil parish (ancient)	624	Huntingdonshire	Huntingdon; RD	
	Elton	Civil parish (ancient)	726	Huntingdonshire	Norman Cross; RD	
	Farcet	Civil parish (1866, p.c.)	1,647	Huntingdonshire	Norman Cross; RD	
	Fenstanton	Civil parish (ancient)	2,868	Huntingdonshire	St Ives; RD	
	Folksworth and Washingley	Civil parish (from 1935)	905	Huntingdonshire	Norman Cross; RD	
	Glatton	Civil parish (ancient)	304	Huntingdonshire	Norman Cross; RD	
	Godmanchester	Town (ancient parish)	5,996	Huntingdonshire	Huntingdon and Godmanchester; MB	
	Grafham	Civil parish (ancient)	585	Huntingdonshire	St Neots; RD	
	Great Gidding	Civil parish (ancient)	289	Huntingdonshire	Huntingdon; RD	
	Great Gransden	Civil parish (ancient)	969	Huntingdonshire	St Neots; RD	
	Great Paxton	Civil parish (ancient)	1,019	Huntingdonshire	St Neots; RD	
	Great Staughton	Civil parish (ancient)	836	Huntingdonshire	St Neots; RD	
	Haddon	Civil parish (ancient)	56	Huntingdonshire	Norman Cross; RD	
	Hail Weston	Civil parish (prev. chap.)	591	Huntingdonshire	St Neots; RD	
	Hamerton and Steeple Gidding	Civil parish (from 2010)	143	Huntingdonshire	Huntingdon; RD	
	Hemingford Abbots	Civil parish (ancient)	583	Huntingdonshire	St Ives; RD	
	Hemingford Grey	Civil parish (ancient)	2,524	Huntingdonshire	St Ives; RD	
	Hilton	Civil parish (prev. chap.)	982	Huntingdonshire	St Ives; RD	
	Holme	Civil parish (1866, p.c.)	610	Huntingdonshire	Norman Cross; RD	
	Holywell-cum-Needingworth	Civil parish (ancient)	2,539	Huntingdonshire	St Ives; RD	
	Houghton and Wyton	Civil parish (from 1935)	1,595	Huntingdonshire	St Ives; RD	
	Huntingdon	Town (ancient)	20,099	Huntingdonshire	Huntingdon and Godmanchester; MB	
	Kimbolton	Civil parish (ancient)	1,432	Huntingdonshire	St Neots; RD	
	Kings Ripton	Civil parish (ancient)	168	Huntingdonshire	Huntingdon; RD	
	Leighton	Civil parish (ancient)	224	Huntingdonshire	Huntingdon; RD	
	Little Gidding	Civil parish (ancient)	35	Huntingdonshire	Huntingdon; RD	
	Little Paxton	Civil parish (prev. chap.)	3,006	Huntingdonshire	St Neots; RD	
	Morborne	Civil parish (ancient)	37	Huntingdonshire	Norman Cross; RD	
	Offord Cluny and Offord D'Arcy	Civil parish (from 2010)	1,249	Huntingdonshire	St Neots; RD	
	Old Hurst	Civil parish (prev. chap.)	249	Huntingdonshire	St Ives; RD	
	Old Weston	Civil parish (ancient)	190	Huntingdonshire	Huntingdon; RD	
	Perry	Civil parish (from 1980s)	1,146	Huntingdonshire	St Neots; RD	
	Pidley cum Fenton	Civil parish (prev. chap.)	367	Huntingdonshire	St Ives; RD	
	Ramsey	Town (ancient parish)	8,047	Huntingdonshire	Ramsey UD	
	Sawtry	Civil parish (from 1935)	5,568	Huntingdonshire	Huntingdon; RD	
	Sibson-cum-Stibbington	Civil parish (ancient)	438	Huntingdonshire	Norman Cross; RD	
	Somersham	Civil parish (ancient)	3,802	Huntingdonshire	St Ives; RD	
	Southoe and Midloe	Civil parish (from 1935)	411	Huntingdonshire	St Neots; RD	
	Spaldwick	Civil parish (ancient)	613	Huntingdonshire	Huntingdon; RD	
	St Ives	Town (ancient)	16,001	Huntingdonshire	St Ives MB	
	St Neots	Town (anc.-1895 & 1974-)	27,372	Huntingdonshire	St Neots; UD	
	Stilton	Civil parish (ancient)	2,445	Huntingdonshire	Norman Cross; RD	
	Stow Longa	Civil parish (ancient)	135	Huntingdonshire	St Neots; RD	
	The Stukeleys	Civil parish (from 1935)	2,052	Huntingdonshire	Huntingdon; RD	
	Tilbrook	Civil parish (ancient)	258	Huntingdonshire	St Neots; RD	
	Toseland	Civil parish (prev. chap.)	79	Huntingdonshire	St Neots; RD	
	Upton and Coppingford	Civil parish (from 1935)	207	Huntingdonshire	Huntingdon; RD	
	Upwood and the Raveleys	Civil parish (from 1935)	1,218	Huntingdonshire	Huntingdon; RD	
	Warboys	Civil parish (ancient)	3,866	Huntingdonshire	St Ives; RD	
	Waresley-cum-Tetworth	Civil parish (from 2010)	284	Huntingdonshire	St Neots; RD	
	Water Newton	Civil parish (ancient)	75	Huntingdonshire	Norman Cross; RD	
	Winwick	Civil parish (ancient)	81	Huntingdonshire	Huntingdon; RD	
	Wistow	Civil parish (ancient)	527	Huntingdonshire	St Ives; RD	
	Wood Walton	Civil parish (ancient)	237	Huntingdonshire	Huntingdon; RD	
	Woodhurst	Civil parish (prev. chap.)	327	Huntingdonshire	St Ives; RD	
	Wyton on the Hill	Civil parish (from 2010)	964	Huntingdonshire	St Ives; RD	
	Yaxley	Civil parish (ancient)	7,413	Huntingdonshire	Norman Cross; RD	
	Yelling	Civil parish (ancient)	302	Huntingdonshire	St Neots; RD	
	Ailsworth	Civil parish (from 1866)	413	Peterborough	Peterborough; RD	
	Bainton	Civil parish (prev. chap.)	305	Peterborough	Barnack; RD	
	Barnack	Civil parish (ancient)	851	Peterborough	Barnack; RD	
	Borough Fen	Civil parish (from 1858)	130	Peterborough	Peterborough; RD	
	Bretton	Civil parish (from 1994)	12,689	Peterborough	Peterborough MB	
	Castor	Civil parish (ancient)	817	Peterborough	Peterborough; RD	
	Deeping Gate	Civil parish (from 1866)	465	Peterborough	Peterborough; RD	
	Etton	Civil parish (ancient)	158	Peterborough	Peterborough; RD	
	Eye	Civil parish (ancient)	3,779	Peterborough	Peterborough; RD	
	Glinton	Civil parish (prev. chap.)	1,752	Peterborough	Peterborough; RD	
	Hampton Hargate and Vale	Civil parish (from 2010)	1,007	Peterborough	Old Fletton; UD	
	Helpston	Civil parish (ancient)	825	Peterborough	Peterborough; RD	
	Marholm	Civil parish (ancient)	148	Peterborough	Peterborough; RD	
	Maxey	Civil parish (ancient)	690	Peterborough	Peterborough; RD	
	Newborough	Civil parish (c. 1830)	1,377	Peterborough	Peterborough; RD	
	Northborough	Civil parish (ancient)	1,332	Peterborough	Peterborough; RD	
	Old Fletton	Unparished area	16,240	Peterborough	Old Fletton; UD	
	Orton Longueville	Civil parish (ancient)	11,070	Peterborough	Norman Cross; RD	
	Orton Waterville	Civil parish (ancient)	9,976	Peterborough	Norman Cross; RD	
	Peakirk	Civil parish (ancient)	321	Peterborough	Peterborough; RD	
	Peterborough	Unparished area	85,796	Peterborough	Peterborough MB	
	Southorpe	Civil parish (from 1866)	134	Peterborough	Barnack; RD	
	St Martin's Without	Civil parish (from 1894)	46	Peterborough	Barnack; RD	
	Stanground North	Unparished area	0	Peterborough	Thorney; RD	
	Sutton	Civil parish (1866, p.c.)	120	Peterborough	Peterborough; RD	
	Thorney	Civil parish (ancient)	2,166	Peterborough	Thorney; RD	
	Thornhaugh	Civil parish (ancient)	187	Peterborough	Barnack; RD	
	Ufford	Civil parish (ancient)	226	Peterborough	Barnack; RD	
	Upton	Civil parish (1866, p.c.)	72	Peterborough	Peterborough; RD	
	Wansford	Civil parish (prev. chap.)	446	Peterborough	Barnack; RD	
	Wittering	Civil parish (ancient)	2,297	Peterborough	Barnack; RD	
	Wothorpe	Civil parish (from 1866)	226	Peterborough	Barnack; RD	
	Abington Pigotts	Civil parish (ancient)	143	South Cambs	South Cambs; RD	
	Arrington	Civil parish (ancient)	389	South Cambs	South Cambs; RD	
	Babraham	Civil parish (ancient)	269	South Cambs	South Cambs; RD	
	Balsham	Civil parish (ancient)	1,641	South Cambs	South Cambs; RD	
	Bar Hill	Civil parish (from 1966)	4,233	South Cambs	Chesterton; RD	
	Barrington	Civil parish (ancient)	904	South Cambs	South Cambs; RD	
	Bartlow	Civil parish (ancient)	102	South Cambs	South Cambs; RD	
	Barton	Civil parish (ancient)	799	South Cambs	Chesterton; RD	
	Bassingbourn cum Kneesworth	Civil parish (from 1966)	4,005	South Cambs	South Cambs; RD	
	Bourn	Civil parish (ancient)	929	South Cambs	Chesterton; RD	
	Boxworth	Civil parish (ancient)	226	South Cambs	Chesterton; RD	
	Caldecote	Civil parish (ancient)	793	South Cambs	Chesterton; RD	
	Cambourne	Civil parish (from 2004)	1,044	South Cambs	Chesterton; RD	
	Carlton	Civil parish (ancient)	166	South Cambs	South Cambs; RD	
	Castle Camps	Civil parish (ancient)	600	South Cambs	South Cambs; RD	
	Caxton	Civil parish (ancient)	271	South Cambs	Chesterton; RD	
	Childerley	Civil parish (ancient)	27	South Cambs	Chesterton; RD	
	Comberton	Civil parish (ancient)	2,189	South Cambs	Chesterton; RD	
	Conington	Civil parish (ancient)	120	South Cambs	Chesterton; RD	
	Coton	Civil parish (ancient)	773	South Cambs	Chesterton; RD	
	Cottenham	Civil parish (ancient)	5,652	South Cambs	Chesterton; RD	
	Croxton	Civil parish (ancient)	163	South Cambs	Chesterton; RD	
	Croydon	Civil parish (ancient)	221	South Cambs	South Cambs; RD	
	Dry Drayton	Civil parish (ancient)	582	South Cambs	Chesterton; RD	
	Duxford	Civil parish (from 1874)	1,836	South Cambs	South Cambs; RD	
	Elsworth	Civil parish (ancient)	657	South Cambs	Chesterton; RD	
	Eltisley	Civil parish (ancient)	421	South Cambs	Chesterton; RD	
	Fen Ditton	Civil parish (ancient)	747	South Cambs	Chesterton; RD	
	Fen Drayton	Civil parish (ancient)	825	South Cambs	Chesterton; RD	
	Fowlmere	Civil parish (ancient)	1,190	South Cambs	South Cambs; RD	
	Foxton	Civil parish (ancient)	1,161	South Cambs	South Cambs; RD	
	Fulbourn	Civil parish (from 1765)	4,704	South Cambs	Chesterton; RD	
	Gamlingay	Civil parish (ancient)	3,535	South Cambs	South Cambs; RD	
	Girton	Civil parish (ancient)	3,752	South Cambs	Chesterton; RD	
	Grantchester	Civil parish (ancient)	552	South Cambs	Chesterton; RD	
	Graveley	Civil parish (ancient)	223	South Cambs	Chesterton; RD	
	Great Abington	Civil parish (ancient)	854	South Cambs	South Cambs; RD	
	Great and Little Chishill	Civil parish (from 1968)	608	South Cambs	South Cambs; RD	
	Great Eversden	Civil parish (ancient)	227	South Cambs	South Cambs; RD	
	Great Shelford	Civil parish (ancient)	3,949	South Cambs	Chesterton; RD	
	Great Wilbraham	Civil parish (ancient)	639	South Cambs	Chesterton; RD	
	Guilden Morden	Civil parish (ancient)	929	South Cambs	South Cambs; RD	
	Hardwick	Civil parish (ancient)	2,630	South Cambs	Chesterton; RD	
	Harlton	Civil parish (ancient)	303	South Cambs	Chesterton; RD	
	Harston	Civil parish (ancient)	1,692	South Cambs	Chesterton; RD	
	Haslingfield	Civil parish (ancient)	1,550^{1}	South Cambs	Chesterton; RD	
	Hatley	Civil parish (from 1957)	205	South Cambs	South Cambs; RD	
	Hauxton	Civil parish (ancient)	687	South Cambs	Chesterton; RD	
	Heydon	Civil parish (ancient)	206	South Cambs	South Cambs; RD	
	Hildersham	Civil parish (ancient)	202	South Cambs	South Cambs; RD	
	Hinxton	Civil parish (ancient)	315	South Cambs	South Cambs; RD	
	Histon	Civil parish (from c1800)	4,362	South Cambs	Chesterton; RD	
	Horningsea	Civil parish (ancient)	331	South Cambs	Chesterton; RD	
	Horseheath	Civil parish (ancient)	465	South Cambs	South Cambs; RD	
	Ickleton	Civil parish (ancient)	655	South Cambs	South Cambs; RD	
	Impington	Civil parish (ancient)	3,676	South Cambs	Chesterton; RD	
	Kingston	Civil parish (ancient)	214	South Cambs	South Cambs; RD	
	Knapwell	Civil parish (ancient)	92	South Cambs	Chesterton; RD	
	Landbeach	Civil parish (ancient)	825	South Cambs	Chesterton; RD	
	Linton	Civil parish (ancient)	4,310	South Cambs	South Cambs; RD	
	Litlington	Civil parish (ancient)	813	South Cambs	South Cambs; RD	
	Little Abington	Civil parish (ancient)	529	South Cambs	South Cambs; RD	
	Little Eversden	Civil parish (ancient)	559	South Cambs	South Cambs; RD	
	Little Gransden	Civil parish (ancient)	262	South Cambs	South Cambs; RD	
	Little Shelford	Civil parish (ancient)	797	South Cambs	Chesterton; RD	
	Little Wilbraham	Civil parish (ancient)	394	South Cambs	Chesterton; RD	
	Lolworth	Civil parish (ancient)	136	South Cambs	Chesterton; RD	
	Longstanton	Civil parish (from 1953)	1,700^{2}	South Cambs	Chesterton; RD	
	Longstowe	Civil parish (ancient)	193	South Cambs	South Cambs; RD	
	Madingley	Civil parish (ancient)	206	South Cambs	Chesterton; RD	
	Melbourn	Civil parish (ancient)	4,414	South Cambs	South Cambs; RD	
	Meldreth	Civil parish (ancient)	1,641	South Cambs	South Cambs; RD	
	Milton	Civil parish (ancient)	4,275	South Cambs	Chesterton; RD	
	Newton	Civil parish (prev. chap.)	401	South Cambs	Chesterton; RD	
	Northstowe	Civil parish (from 2021)		South Cambs	Chesterton; RD	
	Oakington and Westwick	Civil parish (from 1985)	1,297^{2}	South Cambs	Chesterton; RD	
	Orchard Park	Civil parish (from 2009)	349	South Cambs	Chesterton; RD	
	Orwell	Civil parish (ancient)	1,080	South Cambs	South Cambs; RD	
	Over	Civil parish (ancient)	2,743	South Cambs	Chesterton; RD	
	Pampisford	Civil parish (ancient)	343	South Cambs	South Cambs; RD	
	Papworth Everard	Civil parish (ancient)	2,012	South Cambs	Chesterton; RD	
	Papworth St Agnes	Civil parish (ancient)	59	South Cambs	Chesterton; RD	
	Rampton	Civil parish (ancient)	440	South Cambs	Chesterton; RD	
	Sawston	Civil parish (ancient)	7,150	South Cambs	South Cambs; RD	
	Shepreth	Civil parish (ancient)	819	South Cambs	South Cambs; RD	
	Shingay cum Wendy	Civil parish (from 1957)	104	South Cambs	South Cambs; RD	
	Shudy Camps	Civil parish (ancient)	310	South Cambs	South Cambs; RD	
	South Trumpington	Civil parish		South Cambs	Chesterton; RD	
	Stapleford	Civil parish (ancient)	1,738	South Cambs	Chesterton; RD	
	Steeple Morden	Civil parish (ancient)	963	South Cambs	South Cambs; RD	
	Stow cum Quy	Civil parish (from C13th)	426	South Cambs	Chesterton; RD	
	Swavesey	Civil parish (ancient)	2,480	South Cambs	Chesterton; RD	
	Tadlow	Civil parish (ancient)	181	South Cambs	South Cambs; RD	
	Teversham	Civil parish (ancient)	2,665	South Cambs	Chesterton; RD	
	Thriplow and Heathfield	Civil parish (ancient)	847	South Cambs	South Cambs; RD	
	Toft	Civil parish (ancient)	581	South Cambs	Chesterton; RD	
	Waterbeach	Civil parish (ancient)	4,431	South Cambs	Chesterton; RD	
	West Wickham	Civil parish (ancient)	423	South Cambs	South Cambs; RD	
	West Wratting	Civil parish (ancient)	436	South Cambs	South Cambs; RD	
	Weston Colville	Civil parish (ancient)	424	South Cambs	South Cambs; RD	
	Whaddon	Civil parish (ancient)	481	South Cambs	South Cambs; RD	
	Whittlesford	Civil parish (ancient)	1,573	South Cambs	South Cambs; RD	
	Willingham	Civil parish (ancient)	3,436	South Cambs	Chesterton; RD	
	Wimpole	Civil parish (ancient)	227	South Cambs	South Cambs; RD	

^{1}including South Trumpington

^{2}including part of Northstowe

== Earliest parishes ==
The following parishes can be identified as having existed as independent units in Huntingdonshire, Cambridgeshire, the Isle of Ely, and Peterborough from the times of earliest recording (at or shortly before the time of Domesday Book):

- In Cambridgeshire: Abington, Abington (Great and Little), Arrington, Ashley, Babraham, Balsham, Barham, Barrington, Barton, Bassingbourn, Bottisham, Bourn, Boxworth, Brinkley, Burrough, Burwell (2 parishes), Cambridge (16 parishes), Camps, Carlton, Caxton, Chatteris, Chesterton, Cheveley, Childerley (Great and Little), Chippenham, Clopton, Comberton, Conington, Cottenham, Coveney, Croxton, Croydon, Ditton, Doddington, Downham, Drayton, Drayton, Dullingham, Duxford (2 parishes), Elm (part), Elsworth, Eltisley, Ely (2 parishes), Eversden, Exning (part), Fordham, Fowlmere, Foxton, Fulbourn (2 parishes), Gamlingay, Girton, Gransden (Little), Grantchester, Graveley, Haddenham, Harlton, Harston, Haslingfield, Hatley (East and St George), Hauxton, Hildersham, Hinton, Hinxton, Histon (2 parishes), Horningsea, Horseheath, Ickleton, Impington, Isleham, Kennett, Kingston, Kirtling, Knapwell, Landbeach, Leverington, Linton (Great and Little), Litlington, Littleport, Lolworth, Longstowe, Madingley, Melbourn, Meldreth, Mepal, Milton, Morden (Guilden and Steeple), Newton, Newton, Oakington, Orwell, Outwell (part), Over, Pampisford, Papworth (St Agnes (part) and Everard), Quy, Rampton, Ramsey (part), Sawston, Shelford, Shepreth, Shingay, Silverley, Snailwell, Soham, Stanground (part), Stanton (2 parishes), Stapleford, Stetchworth, Stow, Stretham, Sutton, Swaffham (Prior (2 parishes) and Bulbeck), Swavesey, Tadlow, Teversham, Thorney, Thriplow, Toft, Trumpington, Tydd (St Giles), Upwell (part), Waterbeach, Wendy, Wentworth, Westley, Weston, Whaddon, Whittlesey (2 parishes), Whittlesford, Wicken, Wickham, Wilbraham (Great and Little), Wilburton, Willingham, Willingham, Wimpole, Wisbech, Witcham, Witchford, Wratting, Wratworth
- In Huntingdonshire: Abbotsley, Alconbury, Alwalton, Bluntisham cum Earith, Botolphbridge, Brampton, Brington, Broughton, Buckden, Buckworth, Caldecote, Catworth (part), Chesterton, Conington, Coppingford, Covington, Denton, Diddington, Easton, Ellington, Elton, Everton (part), Eynesbury, Fletton, Folksworth, Gidding (Great, Little and Steeple), Glatton, Godmanchester, Grafham, Gransden (Great), Haddon, Hamerton, Hartford, Hemingford (Abbots and Grey), Holywell cum Needingworth, Houghton, Huntingdon (16 parishes), Keyston, Kimbolton, Leighton, Longstow, Luddington (part), Lutton (part), Molesworth, Morborne, Newton, Offord (Cluny and D'Arcy), Orton (Longueville and Waterville), Papworth (St Agnes (part)), Paxton, Ramsey (part), Raveley, Ripton (Abbots and Kings), St Ives, St Neots, Sawtry (3 parishes), Sibson, Somersham, Southoe, Spaldwick, Stanground (part), Stanton, Staughton (Great), Stibbington, Stilton, Stukeley (Great and Little), Swineshead, Thurning (part), Upton, Walton, Warboys, Waresley, Washingley, Weston, Winwick (part), Wistow, Woodstone, Woolley, Wyton, Yaxley, Yelling
- In the Nassaborough Hundred of Northamptonshire (also known as the Soke of Peterborough): Barnack, Castor, Etton, Eye, Helpston, Marholm, Maxey, Northborough, Paston, Peakirk, Peterborough, Stamford (the parishes of All Saints and St Martin), Thornhaugh, Ufford, Wittering and Wothorpe, and the extra-parochial area of Borough Fen.

== Timeline of parish changes during the Middle Ages ==
Parish boundaries across England were mostly finalised by the time of the solidification of canon law circa 1220. Changes continued at a slower rate until the Reformation, mostly in the form of abolition of redundant small urban parishes.

- 1109:
  - Wisbech divided into Wisbech St Mary and Wisbech St Peter.
- by 1178:
  - Wistow renamed Bury.
- 12th century or early in the medieval period:
  - Alconbury Weston extra-parochial place becomes a civil parish.
  - Bainton created out of Ufford.
  - Barham and Little Catworth created out of Stow Longa.
  - Bythorn created out of Broughton.
  - Caldecote created out of Bourn.
  - Camps divided into Bartlow, Castle Camps and Shudy Camps.
  - Carlton cum Willingham created by the merger of Carlton and Willingham.
  - Colne and Pidley cum Fenton created out of Somersham.
  - Emneth created from that part of Elm lying in Norfolk, leaving Elm wholly in Cambridgeshire.
  - Eversden divided into Great and Little Eversden.
  - Fen Ditton created out of Horningsea.
  - Glinton created out of Peakirk.
  - Hail Weston created out of Southoe.
  - Hardwick created out of Toft.
  - Hilton created out of Fenstanton.
  - Huntingdon St Botolph, Huntingdon St George, Huntingdon St Germain, Huntingdon St Nicholas abolished and merged into the other Huntingdon parishes.
  - Kneesworth created out of Whaddon.
  - Landwade created from that part of Exning lying in Cambridgeshire, leaving Exning wholly in Suffolk.
  - Linton created by the merger of Barham, Great Linton and Little Linton.
  - Little Raveley and Upwood created out of Wistow.
  - Old Hurst and Woodhurst created out of St Ives.
  - Paxton divided into Great Paxton, Little Paxton and Toseland.
  - Shelford divided into Great and Little Shelford.
  - Sibson cum Stibbington created by the merger of Sibson and Stibbington.
  - Silverley abolished and merged into Ashley (sometimes thenceforth Ashley cum Silverley).
  - Stow cum Quy created by the merger of Stow and Quy.
  - Wansford created out of Thornhaugh.
  - Wratworth abolished and merged into Wimpole.
- 13th century:
  - Huntingdon St Lawrence abolished and merged into the other Huntingdon parishes.
  - The Westwick area transferred from Cottenham to Oakington, but remaining part of Chesterton hundred.
- Circa 1250:
  - Cambridge St Radegund created out of Cambridge All Saints in the Jewry.
- 1312:
  - Huntingdon St Edmund abolished and merged into the other Huntingdon parishes.
- 1343:
  - Huntingdon St Martin abolished and merged into the other Huntingdon parishes.
- 14th century:
  - Coton created out of Grantchester.
  - Huntingdon Holy Trinity abolished and merged into the other Huntingdon parishes.
- 1351:
  - Wistow created out of Bury.
- 1352:
  - Cambridge St Peter outside Trumpington Gates renamed Cambridge St Mary the Less.
  - Cambridge St Mary renamed Cambridge St Mary the Great.
  - Cambridge St Peter by the Castle renamed Cambridge St Peter.
- 1365:
  - Cambridge All Saints by the Castle abolished and merged into Cambridge St Giles.
  - Cambridge All Saints in the Jewry renamed Cambridge All Saints.
- 1372:
  - Huntingdon St Clement abolished and merged into the other Huntingdon parishes.
- 1434:
  - Stamford Baron All Saints abolished and merged into Stamford Baron St Martin.
- 1446:
  - Cambridge St John Zachary abolished and merged into Cambridge St Edward.
- Circa 1500: Childerley created by the merger of Great and Little Childerley.
- 1529:
  - Huntingdon St Andrew abolished and merged into the other Huntingdon parishes.
- 1537:
  - Sawtry St Judith abolished, becoming extra-parochial.
- 1540:
  - Royston created from parts of the parishes of Barkway, Reed and Therfield in Hertfordshire and Melbourn and Kneesworth in Cambridgeshire. The county boundary was not changed, so the new parish straddled Hertfordshire and Cambridgeshire.
- 1541:
  - Peterborough Minster Close Precincts becomes extra-parochial upon Peterborough Abbey's being created a cathedral.
  - Wothorpe abolished and merged into Stamford Baron St Martin.
- 16th century:
  - Huntingdon St Michael and Huntingdon St Peter abolished and merged into the other Huntingdon parishes.
  - Newton created out of Hauxton.

== Hundreds and parishes at the Reformation ==
By the middle of the 16th century the system of hundreds, which had been somewhat fluid through the Middle Ages, had become finalised. The structure of hundreds and parishes would remain essentially unchanged until the 1830s. XP stands for extra-parochial.

Ancient county	Hundred	Parishes
Northamptonshire	Nassaborough or Soke of Peterborough	Bainton • Barnack • Borough Fen (XP) • Castor • Etton • Eye • Glinton • Helpston • Marholm • Maxey • Northborough • Paston • Peakirk • Peterborough Minster Close Precincts (XP) • Peterborough St John the Baptist • Stamford Baron St Martin • Thornhaugh • Ufford • Wansford • Wittering
Huntingdonshire	Hurstingstone	Abbots Ripton • Bluntisham cum Earith • Broughton • Bury • Colne • Great Raveley • Great Stukeley • Hartford • Holywell cum Needingworth • Houghton • Kings Ripton • Little Raveley • Little Stukeley • Old Hurst • Pidley cum Fenton • Ramsey (part) • St Ives • Sapley (XP) • Somersham • Upwood • Warboys • Wistow • Woodhurst • Wyton
Huntingdonshire	Leightonstone	Alconbury • Alconbury Weston • Barham • Brampton • Brington • Buckworth • Bythorn • Coppingford • Covington • Easton • Ellington • Grafham • Great Catworth • Great Gidding • Hamerton • Keyston • Kimbolton • Leighton Bromswold • Little Catworth • Little Gidding • Luddington (part) • Molesworth • Old Weston • Spaldwick • Steeple Gidding • Stow Longa • Swineshead • Thurning (part) • Upton • Winwick (part) • Woolley
Huntingdonshire	Norman Cross	Alwalton • Botolphbridge • Caldecote • Chesterton • Conington • Denton • Elton • Fletton • Folksworth • Glatton • Haddon • Lutton (part) • Morborne • Orton Longueville • Orton Waterville • Sawtry All Saints • Sawtry Judith (XP) • Sawtry St Andrew • Sibson cum Stibbington • Stanground (part) • Stilton • Washingley • Water Newton • Woodstone • Woodwalton • Yaxley
Huntingdonshire	Toseland	Abbotsley • Buckden • Diddington • Everton (part) • Eynesbury • Fenstanton • Godmanchester • Great Gransden • Great Paxton • Great Staughton • Hail Weston • Hemingford Abbots • Hemingford Grey • Hilton • Little Paxton • Midloe (XP) • Offord Cluny • Offord D'Arcy • Papworth St Agnes (part) • St Neots • Southoe • Toseland • Waresley • Yelling
Huntingdonshire	not in a hundred	Huntingdon All Saints • Huntingdon St Benedict • Huntingdon St John the Baptist • Huntingdon St Mary
Isle of Ely (quasi-independent region of Cambridgeshire)	Ely	Downham • Ely College (XP) • Ely St Mary • Ely Trinity • Littleport
Isle of Ely (quasi-independent region of Cambridgeshire)	North Witchford	Chatteris • Doddington • Ramsey (part) • Stanground (part) • Whittlesey St Andrew • Whittlesey St Mary
Isle of Ely (quasi-independent region of Cambridgeshire)	South Witchford	Coveney • Grunty Fen (XP) • Haddenham • Mepal • Stretham • Sutton • Welches Dam (XP) • Wentworth • Wilburton • Witcham • Witchford
Isle of Ely (quasi-independent region of Cambridgeshire)	Wisbech	Elm • Leverington • Newton • Outwell (part) • Thorney • Tydd St Giles • Upwell (part) • Wisbech St Mary • Wisbech St Peter
Cambridgeshire	Armingford	Abington Pigotts • Bassingbourn • Clopton • Croydon • East Hatley • Guilden Morden • Kneesworth • Litlington • Melbourn • Meldreth • Royston (part) • Shingay • Steeple Morden • Tadlow • Wendy • Whaddon
Cambridgeshire	Chesterton	Chesterton • Childerley • Cottenham • Dry Drayton • Histon St Andrew • Histon St Etheldreda • Oakington (part)
Cambridgeshire	Cheveley	Ashley • Cheveley • Kirtling • Woodditton
Cambridgeshire	Chilford	Babraham • Bartlow • Castle Camps • Great Abington • Hildersham • Horseheath • Linton • Little Abington • Pampisford • Shudy Camps • West Wickham
Cambridgeshire	Flendish	Cherry Hinton • Fen Ditton • Fulbourn All Saints • Fulbourn St Vigor • Horningsea • Teversham
Cambridgeshire	Longstow	Bourn • Caldecote • Caxton • Croxton • Eltisley • Gamlingay • Great Eversden • Hardwick • Hatley St George • Kingston • Little Eversden • Little Gransden • Longstowe • Toft
Cambridgeshire	Northstow	Girton • Impington • Landbeach • Lolworth • Longstanton All Saints • Longstanton St Michael • Madingley • Milton • Oakington (part) • Rampton • Waterbeach
Cambridgeshire	Papworth	Boxworth • Conington • Elsworth • Fen Drayton • Graveley • Knapwell • Over • Papworth Everard • Papworth Agnes • Swavesey • Willingham
Cambridgeshire	Radfield	Balsham • Brinkley • Burrough Green • Carlton cum Willingham • Dullingham • Stetchworth • Westley Waterless • Weston Colville • West Wratting
Cambridgeshire	Staine	Bottisham • Great Wilbraham • Little Wilbraham • Stow cum Quy • Swaffham Bulbeck • Swaffham Prior SS Cyriac & Julitta • Swaffham Prior St Mary
Cambridgeshire	Staploe	Burwell St Andrew • Burwell St Mary • Chippenham • Fordham • Isleham • Kennett • Landwade • Snailwell • Soham • Wicken
Cambridgeshire	Thriplow	Fowlmere • Foxton • Great Shelford • Harston • Hauxton • Little Shelford • Newton • Stapleford • Thriplow • Trumpington
Cambridgeshire	Wetherley	Arrington • Barrington • Barton • Comberton • Coton • Grantchester • Harlton • Haslingfield • Orwell • Shepreth • Wimpole
Cambridgeshire	Whittlesford	Duxford St John • Duxford St Peter • Hinxton • Ickleton • Sawston • Whittlesford
Cambridgeshire	not in a hundred	Cambridge All Saints • Cambridge Holy Sepulchre • Cambridge Holy Trinity • Cambridge St Andrew the Great • Cambridge St Andrew the Less • Cambridge St Benedict • Cambridge St Botolph • Cambridge St Clement • Cambridge St Edward • Cambridge St Giles • Cambridge St Mary the Great • Cambridge St Mary the Less • Cambridge St Michael • Cambridge St Peter by the Castle • Cambridge St Radegund • University of Cambridge (XP)

== Timeline of changes from 1550 to 1900 ==
- 1561:
  - Clopton abolished and merged into Croydon (sometimes thenceforth Croydon cum Clopton).
- 17th century: Histon formed by the merger of Histon St Andrew and Histon St Etheldreda.
- 1667:
  - Swaffham Prior formed by the merger of Swaffham Prior SS Cyriac & Julitta and Swaffham Prior St Mary.
- Circa 1700:
  - Burwell formed by the merger of Burwell St Andrew and Burwell St Mary.
- 1702:
  - Botolphbridge abolished and merged into Orton Longueville.
- 1747:
  - Newmarket All Saints created out of Woodditton.
- 1765:
  - Fulbourn created by the merger of Fulbourn All Saints and Fulbourn St Vigor.
- 1810:
  - Tetworth created out of Everton, comprising all of that portion of Everton within Huntingdonshire plus a small area in Bedfordshire.
- 1822:
  - Newborough created out of part of Borough Fen.
- 20 October 1844 (Counties (Detached Parts) Act 1844):
  - That portion of Tetworth within Bedfordshire transferred to Huntingdonshire.
- 1849:
  - Whittlesey created by the merger of Whittlesey St Andrew and Whittlesey St Mary.
- 1851:
  - That part of Elton lying within Northamptonshire is transferred to Huntingdonshire.
- 1856:
  - University of Cambridge extra-parochial place abolished.
- 1857:
  - Cambridge St Radegund abolished and merged back into Cambridge All Saints.
- 1858 (Extra Parochial Places Act):
  - Borough Fen, Ely College, Grunty Fen, Midloe, Peterborough Minster Close Precincts, Sawtry St Judith and Welches Dam extra-parochial places become civil parishes.
  - Sapley extra-parochial place absorbed into Kings Ripton.
- 1866 (Poor Law Amendment Act 1866: the legal definition of parish was changed to be those areas which maintained their own poor laws):
  - Ailsworth, Sutton and Upton created out of Castor.
  - Ashton created out of Ufford.
  - Benwick, March and Wimblington created out of Doddington.
  - Deeping Gate created out of Maxey.
  - Farcet created out of Stanground.
  - Gunthorpe, Walton and Werrington created out of Paston.
  - Holme created out of Glatton.
  - Manea created out of Coveney.
  - Parson Drove created out of Leverington.
  - Pilsgate and Southorpe created out of Barnack.
  - Thetford created out of Stretham.
  - Welney created out of Upwell; like its parent parish, partly in Cambridgeshire and partly in Norfolk.
  - Westwick created out of Oakington.
  - Wothorpe re-created out of Stamford Baron St Martin.
- 1871:
  - That part of Ramsey within Cambridgeshire is transferred to Huntingdonshire.
- 1874:
  - Duxford created by the merger of Duxford St John and Duxford St Peter.
- 25 March 1885:
  - Catworth formed by the merger of Great Catworth and Little Catworth.
  - A detached part of Hilgay is transferred to Littleport.
- 25 March 1886:
  - Cambridge St Peter abolished and merged into Cambridge St Giles.
  - Sawtry All Saints and St Andrew created by the merger of Sawtry All Saints and Sawtry St Andrew.
- 24 March 1887:
  - Ashton abolished and merged into Bainton.
  - Pilsgate abolished and merged back into Barnack.
- 1 April 1889:
  - The parishes within the Isle of Ely quasi-independent region of Cambridgeshire (Benwick, Chatteris, Coveney, Doddington, Downham, Elm, Ely College, Ely St Mary, Ely Trinity (and the common lands between the two), Grunty Fen, Haddenham, Leverington, Littleport, Manea, March, Mepal, Newton, Outwell (part), Parson Drove, Stanground (part), Stretham, Sutton, Thetford, Thorney, Tydd St Giles, Upwell (part), Welches Dam, Welney (part), Wentworth, Whittlesey, Wilburton, Wimblington, Wisbech St Mary, Wisbech St Peter, Witcham and Witchford) are transferred to the new administrative county of Isle of Ely.
  - The parishes in the Soke of Peterborough (Ailsworth, Bainton, Barnack, Borough Fen, Castor, Deeping Gate, Etton, Eye, Glinton, Gunthorpe, Helpston, Marholm, Maxey, Newborough, Northborough, Paston, Peakirk, Peterborough Minster Close Precincts, Peterborough St John the Baptist, Southorpe, Sutton, Thornhaugh, Ufford, Upton, Walton, Wansford, Werrington, Wittering, Wothorpe and the rural part of Stamford Baron St Martin) are transferred to the new administrative county of Peterborough. They are joined by parts of the parishes of Fletton and Woodstone, both previously wholly in Huntingdonshire, but now straddling the county boundary. That part of Stamford Baron St Martin lying within the boundaries of Stamford municipal borough is transferred to Lincolnshire, so that that parish also straddles two counties.
  - Those portions of Outwell and Upwell lying within Cambridgeshire become separate parishes within the Isle of Ely, confusingly also named Outwell and Upwell, so that there are now two parishes named Outwell (one within the Isle of Ely and one within Norfolk) and two named Upwell (ditto).
  - Newmarket All Saints, and the part of Woodditton in the urban district of Newmarket, are transferred from Cambridgeshire to Suffolk, causing Woodditton to straddle the county boundary.
- 1894/5 (Local Government Act 1894 forbids parishes from crossing county, district or borough boundaries):
  - Eynesbury Hardwicke created out of Eynesbury.
  - The parishes of Fletton and Woodstone are divided into Fletton Urban and Rural and Woodstone Urban and Rural respectively; the two Urban parishes within Peterborough municipal borough and the Soke of Peterborough, and the two Rural parishes in Huntingdonshire.
  - Great Chishall, Heydon and Little Chishill transferred from Essex to Cambridgeshire.
  - Lode created out of Bottisham.
  - Peterborough divided into Peterborough Within (the municipal borough) and Peterborough Without.
  - Royston split along the county boundary line into a Royston (Cambridgeshire) and a Royston (Hertfordshire) parish.
  - St Neots split into St Neots Urban and St Neots Rural.
  - Stamford Baron St Martin is divided into a reduced Stamford Baron St Martin, within Lincolnshire, and St Martin's Without within the Soke of Peterborough.
  - Whittlesey split into Whittlesey Urban and Whittlesey Rural.
  - Witcham Gravel created from that part of Witcham within Ely Urban District.
- 30 September 1895:
  - That portion of Papworth St Agnes in Huntingdonshire is transferred to Cambridgeshire, leaving Papworth St Agnes entirely in Cambridgeshire.
  - Redmere transferred from Norfolk to Isle of Ely.
  - Those parts of Thurning, Luddington and Lutton lying within Huntingdonshire are transferred to Northamptonshire.
  - West Welney created from that portion of Welney lying within the Isle of Ely, leaving Welney entirely within Norfolk.
  - The majority of Winwick, lying within Northamptonshire, is transferred to Huntingdonshire.
- 1 October 1895:
  - That part of Woodditton within Suffolk is transferred to Newmarket All Saints, leaving Woodditton wholly within Cambridgeshire.
- 30 September 1896:
  - Royston (Cambridgeshire), along with parts of Bassingbourn, Kneesworth, and Melbourn, transferred to Hertfordshire.
  - Swineshead transferred from Huntingdonshire to Bedfordshire.
  - Tilbrook transferred from Bedfordshire to Huntingdonshire.

== Timeline of changes from 1900 to 1955 ==
- 26 March 1900:
  - Cambridge parish formed by the merger of Cambridge All Saints, Cambridge Holy Sepulchre, Cambridge Holy Trinity, Cambridge St Andrew the Great, Cambridge St Andrew the Less, Cambridge St Benedict, Cambridge St Botolph, Cambridge St Clement, Cambridge St Edward, Cambridge St Giles, Cambridge St Mary the Great, Cambridge St Mary the Less and Cambridge St Michael.
- 1 October 1905:
  - Stanground split into Stanground North (within the Isle of Ely) and Stanground South (within Huntingdonshire).
- 1 November 1908:
  - Longthorpe created out of part of Peterborough Without.
- 1 October 1911:
  - Huntingdon parish formed by the merger of Huntingdon All Saints, Huntingdon St Benedict, Huntingdon St John, and Huntingdon St Mary.
- 1 April 1912:
  - Cambridge Without created out of parts of Cherry Hinton, Grantchester and Trumpington.
- 1 April 1923:
  - Cambridge Without and Chesterton abolished and merged into Cambridge.
- 1926:
  - Whittlesey re-created by the merger of Whittlesey Urban and Whittlesey Rural.
- 26 January 1929:
  - Great Chishall renamed Great Chishill.
- 1 April 1929:
  - Fletton Urban, Gunthorpe, Longthorpe, Paston, Peterborough Without, Peterborough Within, Peterborough Minster Close Precincts, Walton, Werrington and Woodstone Urban are all merged into a single parish of Peterborough. (Peterborough Municipal Borough is expanded to cover the same area.)
- 1 April 1933:
  - Ely Holy Trinity with St Mary created by the merger of Ely Holy Trinity and Ely St Mary, plus much land previously common to the two parishes (which had been for some purposes extra-parochial), plus part of Witchford. Some parts of Ely St Mary are transferred to Thetford and Littleport.
  - Grunty Fen abolished and merged into Wilburton.
  - Redmere abolished and merged into Littleport.
  - Witcham Gravel abolished and merged into Witcham.
- 1934:
  - Cherry Hinton and Trumpington abolished and merged into Cambridge, with some parts of Trumpington transferred to Haslingfield and Grantchester. Parts of the parishes of Fen Ditton, Great Shelford, Impington and Milton are also transferred to Cambridge.
- 1 April 1935:
  - Barham and Woolley created by the merger of Barham and Woolley.
  - Brington and Molesworth created by the merger of Brington and Molesworth.
  - Bythorn and Keyston created by the merger of Bythorn and Keyston.
  - Denton and Caldecote created by the merger of Denton and Caldecote.
  - Folksworth and Washingley created by the merger of Folksworth and Washingley.
  - Hartford abolished and split between Huntingdon, Houghton and Wyton and Kings Ripton.
  - Houghton and Wyton created by the merger of Houghton and Wyton, plus part of Hartford.
  - Sawtry created by the merger of Sawtry All Saints and St Andrew and Sawtry St Judith.
  - Southoe and Midloe created by the merger of Midloe and Southoe.
  - The Stukeleys created by the merger of Great Stukeley and Little Stukeley.
  - Upton and Coppingford created by the merger of Upton and Coppingford.
  - Upwood and the Raveleys created by the merger of Great Raveley, Little Raveley and Upwood.
  - West Welney abolished and split between Upwell (Isle of Ely) and Welney (in Norfolk).
- 1 April 1938:
  - Fletton Rural and Woodstone Rural renamed Fletton and Woodston respectively.
- 1948:
  - Bluntisham cum Earith split into the parishes of Bluntisham and Earith.
- 1 April 1953:
  - Landwade abolished and merged into Fordham.
  - Longstanton created by the merger of Longstanton All Saints and Longstanton St Michael.
- 1 April 1954:
  - Reach created out of Burwell and Swaffham Prior.

== Timeline of changes to parishes from 1955 on ==
- 1950s: Carlton cum Willingham renamed Carlton.
- 1 April 1957:
  - Hatley formed by the merger of East Hatley and Hatley St George, plus some parts of Gamlingay.
  - Shingay cum Wendy created by the merger of Shingay and Wendy.
- 1 April 1960:
  - Welches Dam abolished and split between Chatteris and Manea.
- 1 April 1961:
  - Huntingdon and Godmanchester created by the merger of Huntingdon and Godmanchester.
- 1 April 1965:
  - Cambridgeshire and Isle of Ely and Huntingdon and Peterborough are formed through mergers of the four previous administrative counties.
  - St Neots Urban expands to take in most of Eaton Socon, previously in Bedfordshire.
  - The westernmost portion of Gamlingay parish is transferred to Tetworth in Huntingdon and Peterborough, uniting the two previously detached portions of that parish.
- 1 April 1966:
  - Bar Hill created out of Dry Drayton.
  - Bassingbourn cum Kneesworth created by the merger of Bassingbourn and Kneesworth.
- 1 April 1968:
  - Great and Little Chishill created by the merger of Great Chishill and Little Chishill.
- 1 April 1974:
  - The administrative counties of Cambridgeshire and Isle of Ely and Huntingdon and Peterborough are merged to form the county of Cambridgeshire.
  - Cambridge abolished, becoming an unparished area.
  - Ely formed by the merger of Ely College and Ely Holy Trinity with St Mary.
  - Peterborough, Fletton, Stanground South and Woodston abolished, becoming part of the Peterborough unparished area.
  - St Neots re-created by the merger of Eynesbury and St Neots Urban.
  - Whittlesey abolished, becoming an unparished area.
  - Wisbech St Peter renamed Wisbech.
- 1 November 1981:
  - Whittlesey created a third time from the entirety of the Whittlesey unparished area.
- 1 April 1982:
  - Huntingdon and Godmanchester split back into Huntingdon and Godmanchester.
  - Perry created out of Great Staughton.
- 1 April 1984:
  - Bretton created out of the Peterborough unparished area and part of Marholm.
- 1 April 1985:
  - Oakington and Westwick created by the merger of Oakington and Westwick, plus some parts of Histon and Longstanton, with some parts of Oakington and Westwick transferred to Cottenham and Longstanton.
- 1 April 1990:
  - Outwell (Cambridgeshire) abolished and transferred across the county boundary, becoming part of Outwell (Norfolk).
  - Upwell (Cambridgeshire) abolished, with some parts forming the new parish of Christchurch, and the rest transferred across the county boundary to Upwell (Norfolk).
- 1 April 1994:
  - Gorefield created out of Leverington.
  - The Landwade area transferred from the parish of Fordham, in Cambridgeshire, to the parish of Exning in Suffolk.
- 1998:
  - The City of Peterborough becomes a unitary authority independent of Cambridgeshire.
- 1 April 2004:
  - Cambourne created out of Bourn, Caxton and Knapwell.
  - Stanground North abolished and added to the Peterborough unparished area.
- 1 April 2009:
  - Orchard Park created out of Impington.
- 1 April 2010:
  - Eynesbury Hardwicke and St Neots Rural both abolished and split between Abbotsley and St Neots.
  - Hamerton and Steeple Gidding created by the merger of Hamerton and Steeple Gidding.
  - Hampton Hargate and Vale created out of the Peterborough unparished area.
  - Offord Cluny and Offord D'Arcy created by the merger of Offord Cluny and Offord D'Arcy.
  - Waresley cum Tetworth created by the merger of Tetworth and Waresley.
  - Wyton on the Hill created out of Houghton and Wyton, Old Hurst and Woodhurst.
- 1 January 2016:
  - Newton renamed Newton in the Isle.
- 1 April 2017:
  - South Trumpington created out of Haslingfield.
- 1 April 2018:
  - Rampton renamed Rampton and Woodbeck.
- 1 April 2021:
  - Northstowe created out of Longstanton and Oakington and Westwick.
  - Thriplow renamed Thriplow and Heathfield.

== See also ==
- List of civil parishes in England
