= Upton, Huntingdonshire =

Village in Cambridgeshire, England

Coordinates: 52.3918°N 0.2762°W

Upton
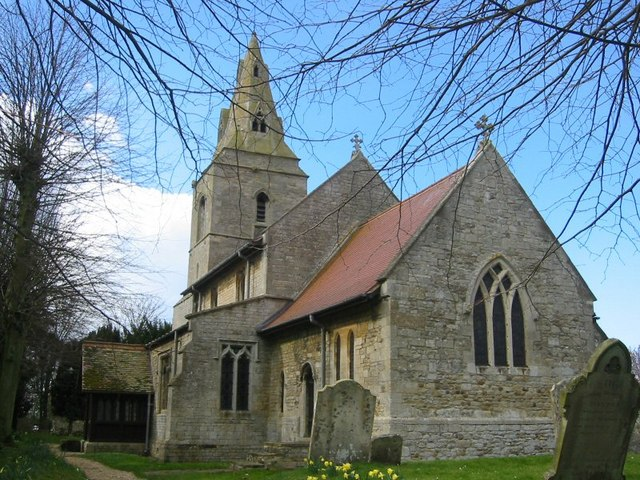
- Upton church

- Location within Cambridgeshire
- Civil parish: Upton and Coppingford
- District: Huntingdonshire
- Shire county: Cambridgeshire
- Region: East
- Country: England
- Sovereign state: United Kingdom

Upton is a village and former civil parish, now in the parish of Upton and Coppingford, in the Huntingdonshire district, in the county of Cambridgeshire, England. It is near Coppingford north west of Huntingdon. In 1931 the parish had a population of 109. Upton has a church called St Margaret's Church which is grade II* listed.

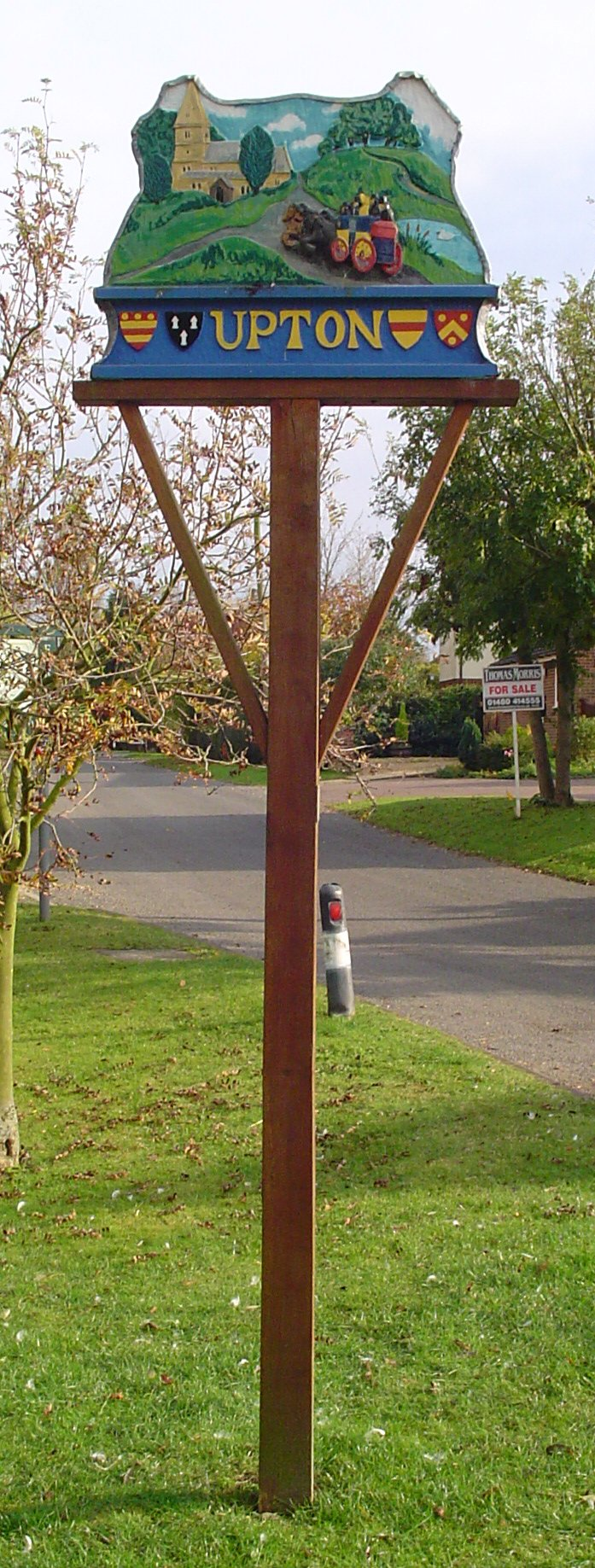
Village sign

== History ==
The name "Upton" means 'Upper farm/settlement'. Upton was recorded in the Domesday Book as Opetune. Upton was "Opetune" in the 11th century, "Vptone" in the 12th century and "Opton" in the 13th century. On 1 April 1935 the parish was abolished and merged with Coppingford to form "Upton and Coppingford". Upton was in the historic and administrative county of Huntingdonshire until 1 April 1965, it then became part of the new administrative county of Huntingdon and Peterborough, on 1 April 1974 it became a part of the county of Cambridgeshire.
