= Southoe =

Village in Cambridgeshire, England

Coordinates: 52.25°N 0.25°W

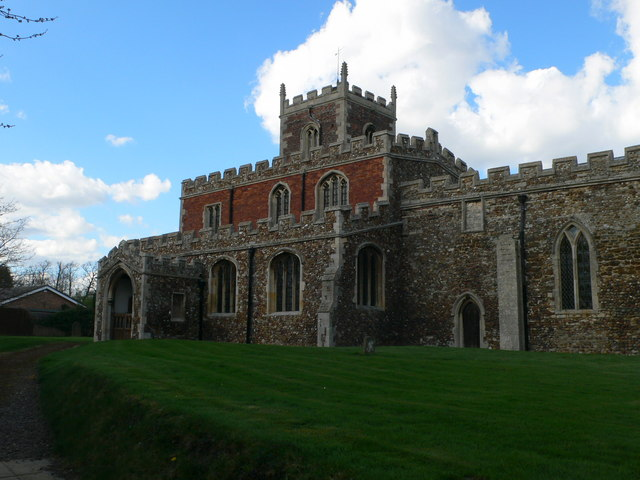
- St Leonard's church

- Location within Cambridgeshire
- OS grid reference: TL194628
- Civil parish: Southoe and Midloe
- District: Huntingdonshire
- Shire county: Cambridgeshire
- Region: East
- Country: England
- Sovereign state: United Kingdom
- Post town: St Neots
- Postcode district: PE19
- Dialling code: 01480
- Police: Cambridgeshire
- Fire: Cambridgeshire
- Ambulance: East of England
- UK Parliament: Huntingdon

Southoe is a small village and former civil parish, now in the parish of Southoe and Midloe, in Cambridgeshire, England. Southoe lies approximately 6 miles (10 km) south-west of Huntingdon on the A1. Southoe is situated within Huntingdonshire which is a non-metropolitan district of Cambridgeshire as well as being a historic county of England. In 1931 the parish had a population of 211.

The church is central in the village and the south doorway contains parts that are of Norman origin.

== History ==
In 1085, William the Conqueror ordered that a survey should be carried out across his kingdom to discover who owned which parts and what it was worth. The survey took place in 1086, and the results were recorded in what, since the 12th century, has become known as the Domesday Book. Starting with the King himself, for each landholder within a county, there is a list of their estates or manors; and, for each manor, there is a summary of the resources of the manor, the amount of annual rent that was collected by the lord of the manor both in 1066 and in 1086, together with the taxable value.

Southoe was listed in the Domesday Book in the Hundred of Toseland in Huntingdonshire; the name of the settlement was written as Sutham in the Domesday Book. In 1086 there were two manors at Southoe; the annual rent paid to the lords of the manors in 1066 had been £7 and the rent had fallen to £4.5 in 1086.

The Domesday Book does not explicitly detail the population of a place but it records that there were 16 households at Southoe. There is no consensus about the average size of a household at that time; estimates range from 3.5 to 5.0 people per household. Using these figures then an estimate of the population of Southoe in 1086 is that it was within the range of 56 and 80 people.

The Domesday Book uses a number of units of measure for areas of land that are now unfamiliar terms, such as hides and ploughlands. In different parts of the country, these were terms for the area of land that a team of eight oxen could plough in a single season and are equivalent to 120 acres (49 hectares); this was the amount of land that was considered to be sufficient to support a single family. By 1086, the hide had become a unit of tax assessment rather than an actual land area; a hide was the amount of land that could be assessed as £1 for tax purposes. The survey records that there were eight ploughlands at Southoe in 1086 and that there was the capacity for a further three ploughlands. In addition to the arable land, there was 30 acres (12 hectares) of meadows, 63 acres (25 hectares) of woodland and a fishery at Southoe.

The tax assessment in the Domesday Book was known as geld or danegeld and was a type of land-tax based on the hide or ploughland. It was originally a way of collecting a tribute to pay off the Danes when they attacked England, and was only levied when necessary. Following the Norman Conquest, the geld was used to raise money for the King and to pay for continental wars; by 1130, the geld was being collected annually. Having determined the value of a manor's land and other assets, a tax of so many shillings and pence per pound of value would be levied on the land holder. While this was typically two shillings in the pound the amount did vary; for example, in 1084 it was as high as six shillings in the pound. For the manors at Southoe the total tax assessed was 6.5 geld.

In 1086 there was no church at Southoe.

== Government ==
Southoe is part of the civil parish of Southoe and Midloe, which has a parish council. The parish council is elected by the residents of the parish who have registered on the electoral roll; the parish council is the lowest tier of government in England. A parish council is responsible for providing and maintaining a variety of local services including allotments and a cemetery; grass cutting and tree planting within public open spaces such as a village green or playing fields. The parish council reviews all planning applications that might affect the parish and makes recommendations to Huntingdonshire District Council, which is the local planning authority for the parish. The parish council also represents the views of the parish on issues such as local transport, policing and the environment. The parish council raises its own tax to pay for these services, known as the parish precept, which is collected as part of the Council Tax. The parish council comprises seven councillors; the council normally meets on the first Wednesday of the month in the village hall. On 1 April 1935 the parish of Southoe was abolished to form "Southoe and Midloe".

Southoe was in the historic and administrative county of Huntingdonshire until 1965. From 1965, the village was part of the new administrative county of Huntingdon and Peterborough. Then in 1974, following the Local Government Act 1972, Southoe became a part of the county of Cambridgeshire.

The second tier of local government is Huntingdonshire District Council which is a non-metropolitan district of Cambridgeshire and has its headquarters in Huntingdon. Huntingdonshire District Council has 52 councillors representing 29 district wards. Huntingdonshire District Council collects the council tax, and provides services such as building regulations, local planning, environmental health, leisure and tourism. Southoe is a part of the district ward of Buckden and is represented on the district council by one councillor. District councillors serve for four-year terms following elections to Huntingdonshire District Council.

For Southoe the highest tier of local government is Cambridgeshire County Council which has administration buildings in Cambridge. The county council provides county-wide services such as major road infrastructure, fire and rescue, education, social services, libraries and heritage services. Cambridgeshire County Council consists of 69 councillors representing 60 electoral divisions. Southoe is part of the electoral division of Buckden, Gransden and The Offords and is represented on the county council by one councillor.

At Westminster Southoe is in the parliamentary constituency of Huntingdon, and elects one Member of Parliament (MP) by the first past the post system of election. Southoe is represented in the House of Commons by Jonathan Djanogly (Conservative). Jonathan Djanogly has represented the constituency since 2001. The previous member of parliament was John Major (Conservative) who represented the constituency between 1983 and 2001.

== Demography ==
=== Population ===
In the period 1801 to 1901 the population of Southoe was recorded every ten years by the UK census. During this time the population was in the range of 213 (the lowest was in 1901) and 307 (the highest was in 1851).

From 1901, a census was taken every ten years with the exception of 1941 (due to the Second World War).

Parish	1911	1921	1931	1951	1961	1971	1981	1991	2001	2011
Midloe	37	33	40							
Southoe	229	214	211							
Southoe and Midloe	266	247	251	267	225	269	428	455	408	

All population census figures from report Historic Census figures Cambridgeshire to 2011 by Cambridgeshire Insight.
The two separate parishes of Southoe and of Midloe were combined into a single parish between 1931 and 1951.

In 2011, the parish covered an area of 2,377 acres (962 hectares) and the population density of the parish of Southoe and Midloe in 2011 was 110.4 persons per square mile (42.6 per square kilometre).
