= North Witchford Rural District =

Former local government area in the UK

Coordinates: 52.372°N 0.183°E

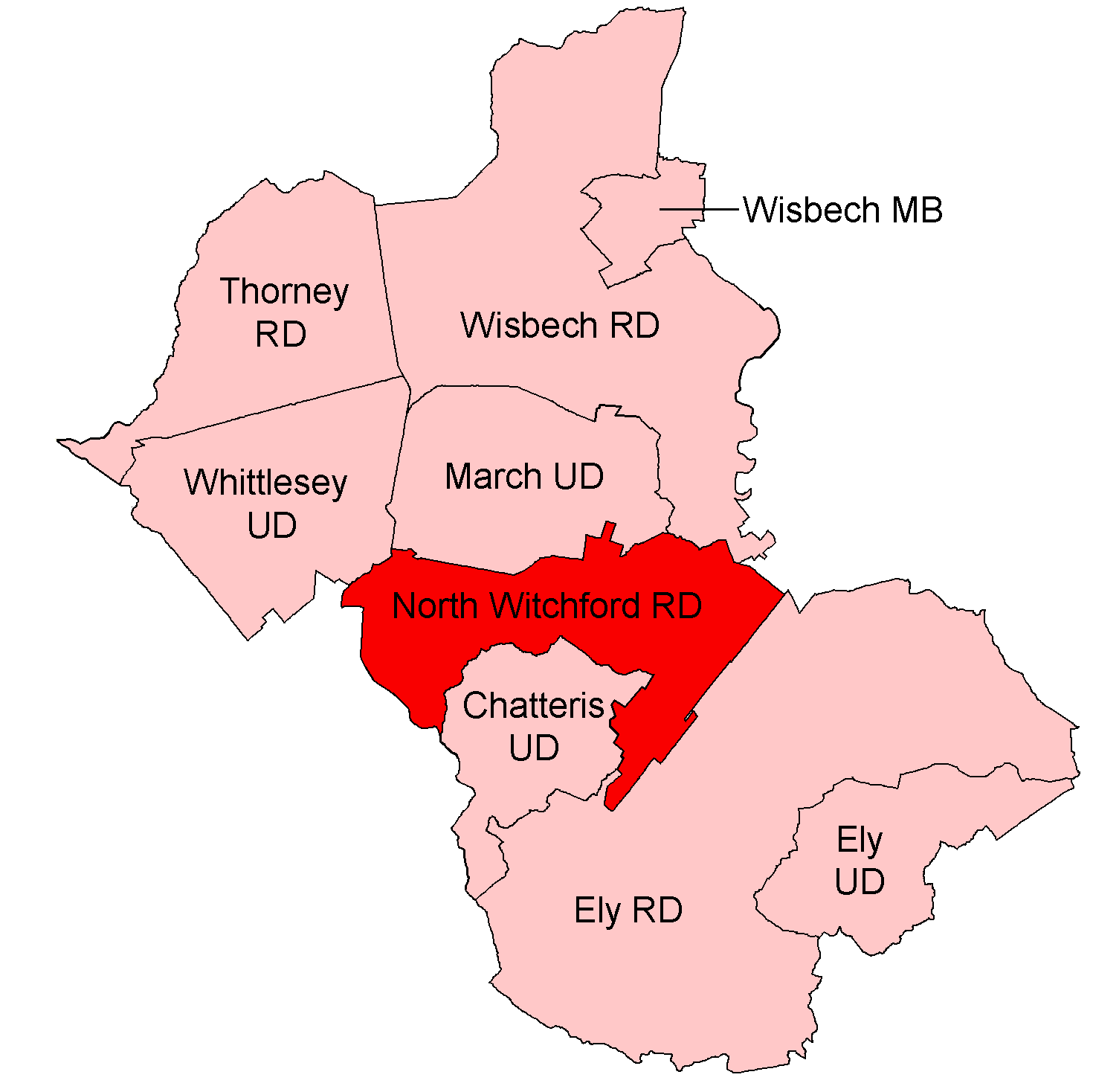
Position within Isle of Ely

North Witchford was a rural district in England from 1894 to 1974. It was named after the ancient hundred of North Witchford.

It was formed in 1894 under the Local Government Act 1894 based on the North Witchford rural sanitary district. It covered the parishes of Benwick, Doddington, Manea, Welches Dam and Wimblington. From 1894 to 1965 it was part of the administrative county of the Isle of Ely, and then Cambridgeshire and Isle of Ely.

It was abolished in 1974 under the Local Government Act 1972, and went on to form part of the district of Fenland
