= Westwick, Cambridgeshire =

Hamlet in Cambridgeshire, England

Coordinates: 52.2673°N 0.0815°E

Westwick
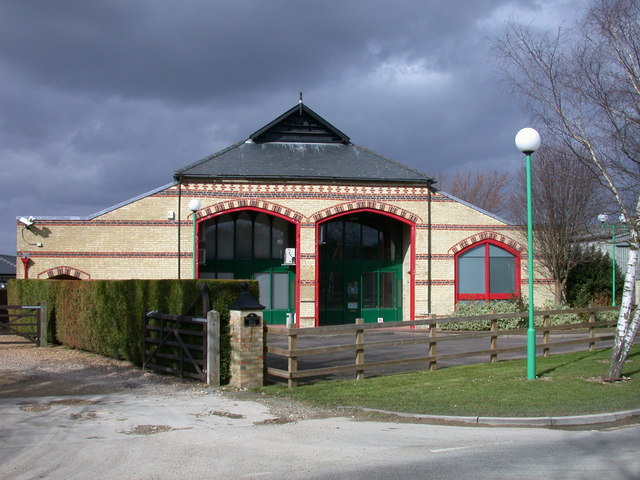
- Old Granary

- Location within Cambridgeshire
- OS grid reference: TL421652
- Civil parish: Oakington and Westwick
- District: South Cambridgeshire
- Shire county: Cambridgeshire
- Region: East
- Country: England
- Sovereign state: United Kingdom
- Post town: CAMBRIDGE
- Postcode district: CB23
- Dialling code: 01223

Westwick is a hamlet and former civil parish, now in the parish of Oakington and Westwick, in the South Cambridgeshire district, in the county of Cambridgeshire, England. It is situated to the north-west of Cambridge. Earthworks suggest that it is a shrunken medieval village. In 1961 the parish had a population of 37.

== History ==
A large grassed area of earthworks, on the west side of Oakington Road and north of Oakington Brook, is believed to contain houses, track ways and ponds that originate from the Medieval period. The earthworks are very easily observed from Oakington Road. Westwick became a parish in 1866, on 1 April 1985 the parish was abolished to form "Oakington and Westwick".
