= Woodhurst =

Village in Cambridgeshire, England

Coordinates: 52.37°N 0.07°W

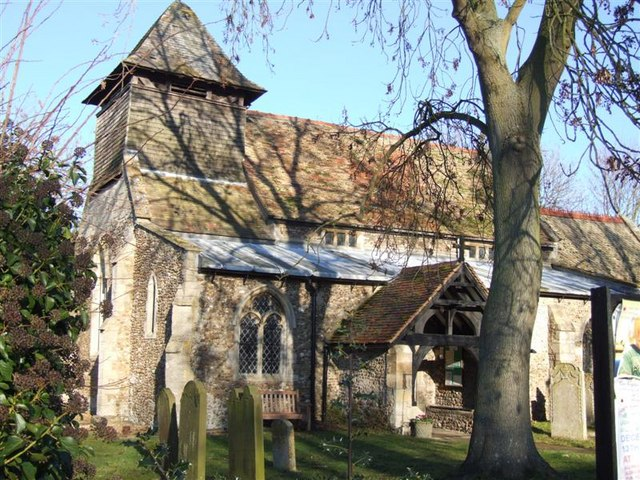
- St John The Baptist Church

- Location within Cambridgeshire
- Population: 394 (2021)
- OS grid reference: TL316760
- District: Huntingdonshire
- Shire county: Cambridgeshire
- Region: East
- Country: England
- Sovereign state: United Kingdom
- Post town: Huntingdon
- Postcode district: PE28
- Police: Cambridgeshire
- Fire: Cambridgeshire
- Ambulance: East of England
- UK Parliament: North West Cambridgeshire
- Website: http://www.woodhurst-cambs.com

Woodhurst is a village and civil parish in Cambridgeshire, England. Woodhurst lies approximately 5 miles (8 km) north-east of Huntingdon and just north of St Ives. Woodhurst is situated within Huntingdonshire which is a non-metropolitan district of Cambridgeshire as well as being a historic county of England.

Woodhurst is one of the best surviving examples of an Anglo-Saxon ring village in England. It is thought that it was originally formed by the track through the forest being widened for about half a mile, and a fence being put round it with a gate at either end.

== History ==
The actual date that the village was formed is not known but it is thought to have been Roman-British. Roman pottery remains have been found near the village, and in the recent excavations in the field next to Wheatsheaf Road to lay a new water main, Roman coins have been found. During 1949 when Moot Way was being built, evidence of Anglo Saxon occupation was found and also some Medieval burials which were thought to be Plague deaths.

The shape of the village has not altered over the centuries although beginning with the church and then the Manor House, buildings were built outside the ring. The name Woodhurst has over the years been spelt Wuduhyrst, Wodehyrst, Wodehirst, Woodhurste and Wood Hurst. There are several explanations as to the original meaning of the name, but hyrst was Old English for 'a wooded hill'.

Woodhurst was not mentioned in the Domesday Book, but as the church was until 1968 a chapelry of St Ives, it is probable that the church and a description of the area and landowners are recorded under Slepe (the original name for St Ives). The oldest part of the present church, the north wall of the nave, was built in the 12th century. The south arcade was built in the 14th century and the chancel is relatively modern having been added in the 19th century. The timber bell-turret was probably built in the early 17th century, but of the three original bells only one remains.

Owing to two disastrous fires in the village in 1834 and 1877, there are only a few old houses in the village. "Horseshoe Cottage" opposite the pond was built in the 17th century and was until 1922 a public house called The Horse Shoes. At one time there were six public houses in the parish of Woodhurst. The oldest house in the village is thought to be "Swan Weir" which dates from the late 16th century.

== Government ==
As a civil parish, Woodhurst has a parish council. The parish council is elected by the residents of the parish who have registered on the electoral roll; the parish council is the lowest tier of government in England. A parish council is responsible for providing and maintaining a variety of local services including allotments and a cemetery; grass cutting and tree planting within public open spaces such as a village green or playing fields. The parish council reviews all planning applications that might affect the parish and makes recommendations to Huntingdonshire District Council, which is the local planning authority for the parish. The parish council also represents the views of the parish on issues such as local transport, policing and the environment. The parish council raises its own tax to pay for these services, known as the parish precept, which is collected as part of the Council Tax. The parish council consists of seven councillors and has a parish clerk; the parish council meets approximately eight times a year.

Woodhurst was in the historic and administrative county of Huntingdonshire until 1965. From 1965, the village was part of the new administrative county of Huntingdon and Peterborough. Then in 1974, following the Local Government Act 1972, Woodhurst became a part of the county of Cambridgeshire.

The second tier of local government is Huntingdonshire District Council which is a non-metropolitan district of Cambridgeshire and has its headquarters in Huntingdon. Huntingdonshire District Council has 52 councillors representing 29 district wards. Huntingdonshire District Council collects the council tax, and provides services such as building regulations, local planning, environmental health, leisure and tourism. Woodhurst is a part of the district ward of Somersham and is represented on the district council by two councillors. District councillors serve for four-year terms following elections to Huntingdonshire District Council.

For Woodhurst the highest tier of local government is Cambridgeshire County Council which has administration buildings in Cambridge. The county council provides county-wide services such as major road infrastructure, fire and rescue, education, social services, libraries and heritage services. Cambridgeshire County Council consists of 69 councillors representing 60 electoral divisions. Woodhurst is part of the electoral division of Somersham and Earith and is represented on the county council by one councillor.

At Westminster Woodhurst is in the parliamentary constituency of North West Cambridgeshire, and elects one Member of Parliament (MP) by the first past the post system of election. Woodhurst is represented in the House of Commons by Shailesh Vara (Conservative). Shailesh Vara has represented the constituency since 2005. The previous member of parliament was Brian Mawhinney (Conservative) who represented the constituency between 1997 and 2005.

== Demography ==
=== Population ===
In the period 1801 to 1901 the population of Woodhurst was recorded every ten years by the UK census. During this time the population was in the range of 245 (the lowest was in 1801) and 554 (the highest was in 1861).

From 1901, a census was taken every ten years with the exception of 1941 (due to the Second World War).

Parish	1911	1921	1931	1951	1961	1971	1981	1991	2001	2011	2021
Woodhurst	247	217	248	233	275	258	311	311	327	379	394

All population census figures from report Historic Census figures Cambridgeshire to 2011 by Cambridgeshire Insight.

In 2011, the parish covered an area of 1,438 acres (582 hectares) and the population density of Woodhurst in 2011 was 168.7 persons per square mile (65.1 per square kilometre).
