= Newborough, Cambridgeshire =

Village in Cambridgeshire, England

Coordinates: 52.638785°N 0.222760°W

Newborough
- Location within Cambridgeshire
- Population: 1,670 (Neighborhood Statistics 2011) 2011 Census
- OS grid reference: TF 20360 06042
- Civil parish: Newborough
- Unitary authority: Peterborough
- Ceremonial county: Cambridgeshire
- Region: East
- Country: England
- Sovereign state: United Kingdom
- Post town: Peterborough
- Postcode district: PE6
- Dialling code: 01733
- Police: Cambridgeshire
- Fire: Cambridgeshire
- Ambulance: East of England
- UK Parliament: Peterborough

Newborough is a village and a civil parish in the Peterborough district, in the ceremonial county of Cambridgeshire, England. Newborough is situated 7.62 km (4.74 mi) north of Peterborough. Newborough has a population of 1,670 according to the 2011 census

Newborough is located along the B1443 and is a short distance away from the A16.

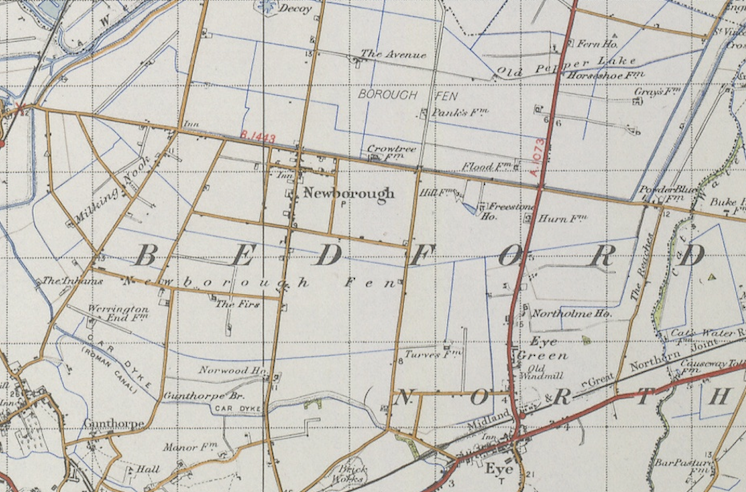
Historical Map of Newborough in 1945.

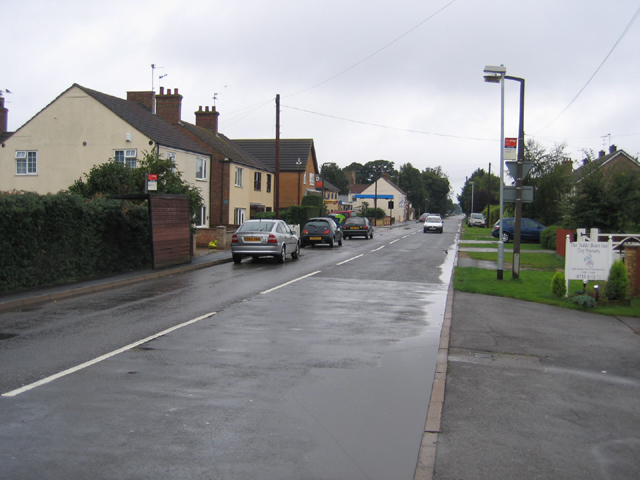
Gunton's Road, Newborough, Peterborough by Rodney Burton

== History ==
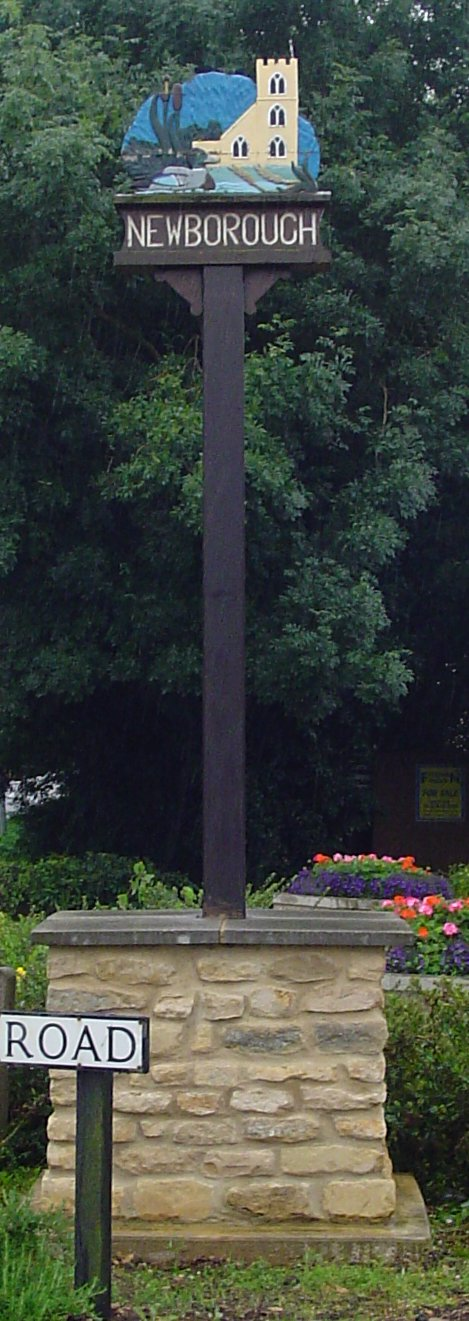
Signpost in Newborough

Newborough means ‘new fortification’ in old English. Newborough was part of the Borough Fen, which was formed into a new parish in 1822.

The land has been much improved by draining, and is now principally arable.

During the Saxon and Medieval periods Borough Fen lay underwater. In the 17th century, a Dutch engineer, Cornelius Vermuyden, began to drain the fenland. One of the earliest dykes cut was the Highland Drain, which runs parallel to the Thorney Road. More efficient drainage systems have led the way to mixed and arable farming. Today the main crops are cereals and sugar beet. However, with the decline of sugar refining in the area, oil-seed rape and more recently linseed are widely grown.

Newborough parish is fairly new, having been formed in 1820. Shortly after 1900 many newer houses were built, and after the First World War council houses were added. After the Second World War a large council estate was built. Then private estates started to spring up making the village grow considerably. Newborough is a very scattered parish, which included a hamlet called Milking Nook, approximately a mile away from the village. On the south-western boundary runs the ancient Roman Car Dyke which is a haven for wildlife.

Until the boundary commission's fifth periodic review, Newborough was divided between three UK Parliamentary constituencies. It now lies wholly within the Peterborough parliamentary constituency.

== St Bartholomew Church ==
Newborough has a Gothic yellow brick church named the St Bartholomew church. "Building work began on the church in 1823 and was completed in 1830. The work was financed by the sale of part of the Borough Fen Estate at the time of the enclosures in 1822. The royal coat of arms is displayed inside, high on the arched wall above the entrance to the sanctuary"

== Population ==
Newborough has a population of 1,670 according to the 2011 census.

== Occupations ==
In 1881 Newborough had a working population of around 342 people with the majority working in agricultural industry, this accounted for 39% of the working population of Newborough. Only 3 individuals had a professional occupation. 39% of the workforce in 1881, 131 women and 3 men, were listed as having an 'unknown occupation’. This does not mean they are unemployed; they may not have had a job title that was listed in the census questionnaire of 1881, or recording may have been faulty.

The 2011 census recorded 504 males and 422 female working, 249 as professionals. The jobs have also changed, shifting from the agricultural sector to more professional and the public sector.

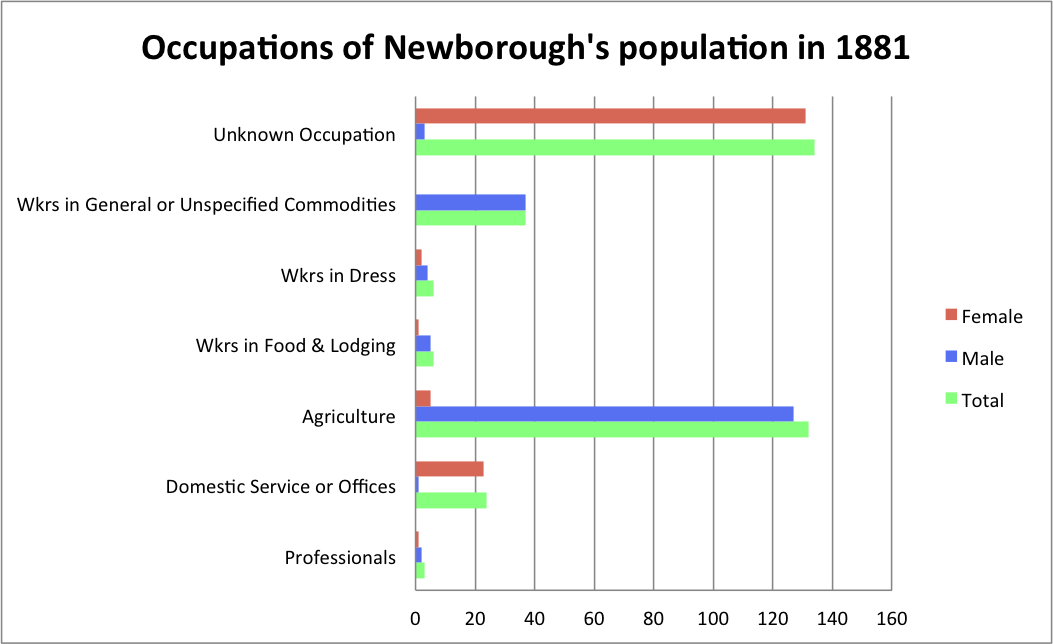
Occupations of Newborough in 1881.

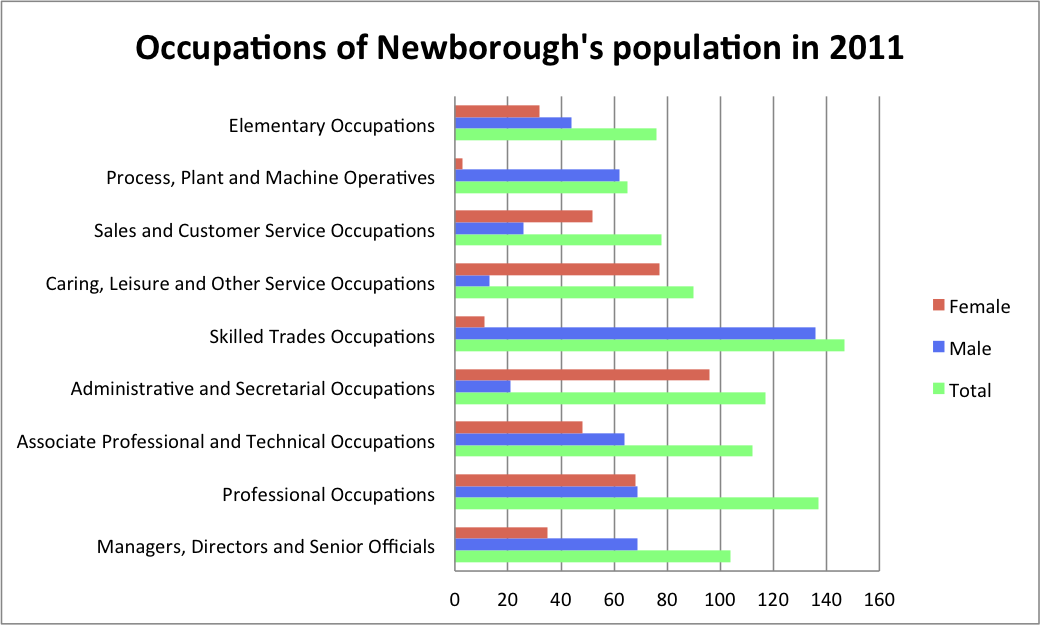
Occupations of Newborough 2011.

== Housing ==
Detached houses or bungalows were 62% of all the 1,136 properties in Newborough in 2011. Another 30% were semi-detached.

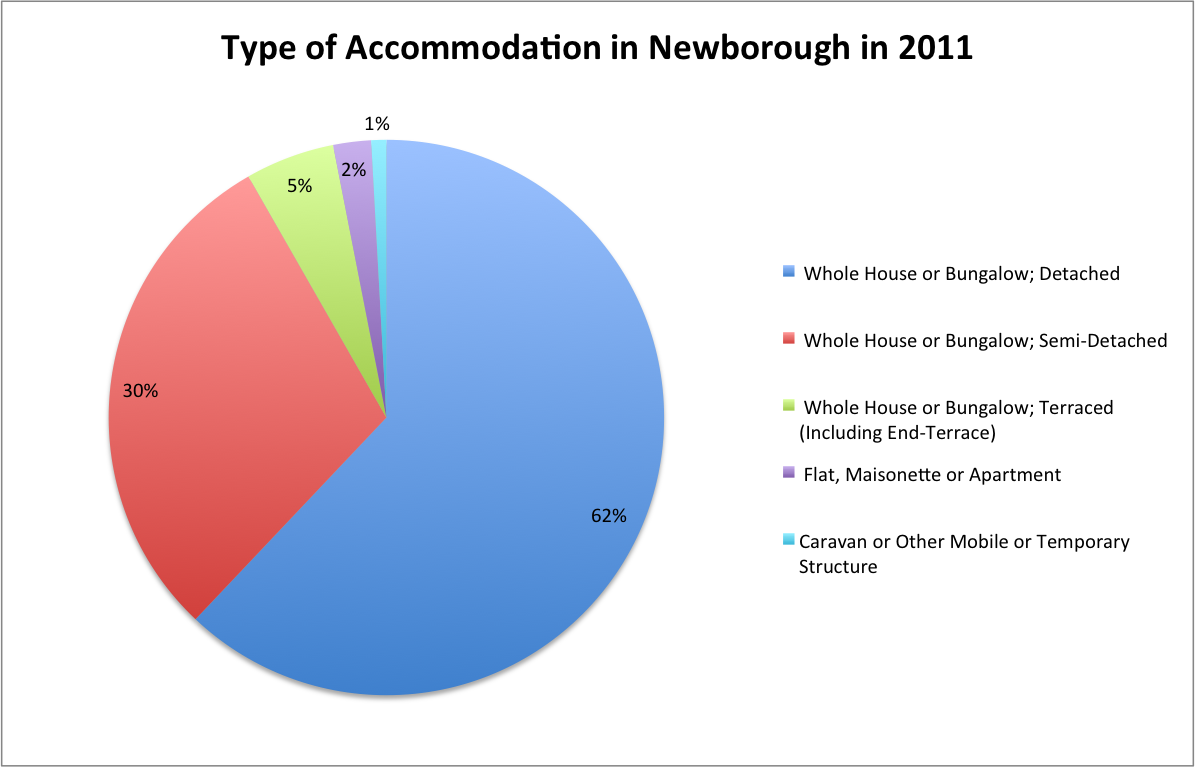

The total number of houses has risen, increasing from 68 in 1831 to 244 in 1961 to 1,136 in 2011. In 1921 the average household in Newborough had 6 rooms, by 2011 the average household had 7 rooms.

== Solar farm ==
In early 2013 Peterborough City Council planned to allow AECOM to build a solar farm and three wind turbines on a 500-acre region in Newborough. However opposition meant that the plan to build three wind turbines was scrapped. There is still some debate over whether the solar farm should go ahead. The solar farm is estimated, by the council, to provide the council with an income of £30m over 25 years and providing locals with cheaper energy bills. Plans for two of the three sites were scrapped in 2014, leaving only the America farm site.
