= Paston, Peterborough =

Area of Peterborough, England

Coordinates: 52.607°N 0.242°W

Paston
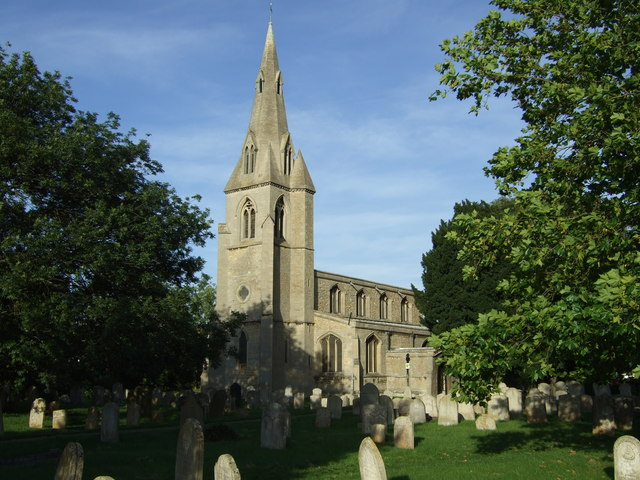

- Location within Cambridgeshire
- Unitary authority: Peterborough
- Ceremonial county: Cambridgeshire
- Region: East
- Country: England
- Sovereign state: United Kingdom
- Post town: PETERBOROUGH
- Postcode district: PE4
- Dialling code: 01733

Paston is a residential area and electoral ward in the city of Peterborough, in the ceremonial county of Cambridgeshire, England.

== Description ==
The area was mainly built and developed in the 1970s and 1980s. Before the Peterborough Development Corporation acquired Paston Ridings in 1974, by use of section 22 of the Commons Act 1899 (62 & 63 Vict. c. 30), everyone had right of access to the common land comprising approximately 20 acres (8 ha).

Demographically Paston has become increasingly diverse, including a large Gypsy community. At the 2001 census it had a population of 8,650. As Peterborough expands, the council has introduced a new statutory development plan. Its aim is to accommodate an additional 22,000 homes, 18,000 jobs and over 40,000 people living in the city by 2020. A further 1,200 homes are to be built at Paston as part of this plan.

Paston Ridings County Primary School has been in existence since 1994 and is an amalgamation of the former Infant and Junior Schools. The school has the capacity for 420 pupils with 14 classrooms, two halls, a computer suite and a separate library area. It has its own swimming pool and substantial grounds. Caverstede Early Years Centre is also located here. Following the closure of nearby Walton Comprehensive School in July 2007, secondary pupils from Paston attend Queen Katharine Academy which opened in September 2007.

== Parish church of All Saints ==
The parish church of All Saints is a Grade I listed building, with fragments dating from the 11th century. The north chapel dates from 1220 and the tower was built in the early 14th century.

== Civil parish ==
In 1921 the parish had a population of 182. On 1 April 1929 the parish was abolished and merged with Peterborough.

== Notable people ==
- Fiona Onasanya - Labour politician and the first female Member of Parliament in the United Kingdom to be jailed.
