= Gorefield =

Village in Cambridgeshire, England

Coordinates: 52.6831°N 0.0921°E

- Location within Cambridgeshire
- Population: 1,184 (2011)
- OS grid reference: TF4111
- District: Fenland
- Shire county: Cambridgeshire
- Region: East
- Country: England
- Sovereign state: United Kingdom
- Post town: Wisbech
- Postcode district: PE13
- Dialling code: 01945
- Police: Cambridgeshire
- Fire: Cambridgeshire
- Ambulance: East of England
- UK Parliament: North East Cambridgeshire

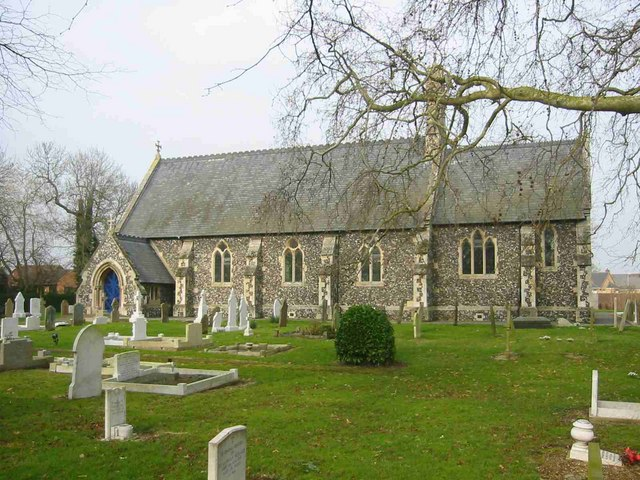
Gorefield, St Paul's Church

Gorefield is a village and civil parish in the Fenland district of Cambridgeshire, England.

At the time of the 2001 census, the parish's population was 1,064 people, increasing to 1,184 at the 2011 census.

The name Gorefield first appears in a manuscript from 1190. Gorefield as a developing village dates to the 19th and 20th centuries. The Church of St Paul was built in 1870 at a cost of £2,000 with the formation of the ecclesiastical parish of Gorefield from Leverington under the Leverington Rectory Act.

In 2004, Gorefield won the Fenland District Award in the Cambridgeshire Village of the Year contest.

== History ==
The corner-stone of the new church was laid on 28 April 1870 by Edward Bowyer Sparke, Esq., son of the late rector of Leverington. The church was built of flint with freestone dressings, the whole cost of the building having been provided for by the late Canon Sparke. Designed to accommodate nearly 300 persons. The contractors were Messrs. S. and W. Pattinson, of Ruskinton, and the architect Mr. Preedy, of London.

== Governance ==
The lowest tier of local government is Gorefield Parish council, the parish sits within Fenland District Council and Cambridgeshire County Council.

== Annual Events ==
A Beer Festival is held every year, in 2022 the sixth annual event is to be held in Gorefield Community Hall.

== Grade II Listed Buildings ==
- Barn, West of Pockfield Farmhouse
- Church of St Paul
- Honeyhill Farmhouse
- Pockfield Farmhouse
