= Wyton on the Hill =

Village in Cambridgeshire, England

Coordinates: 52.346°N 0.114°W

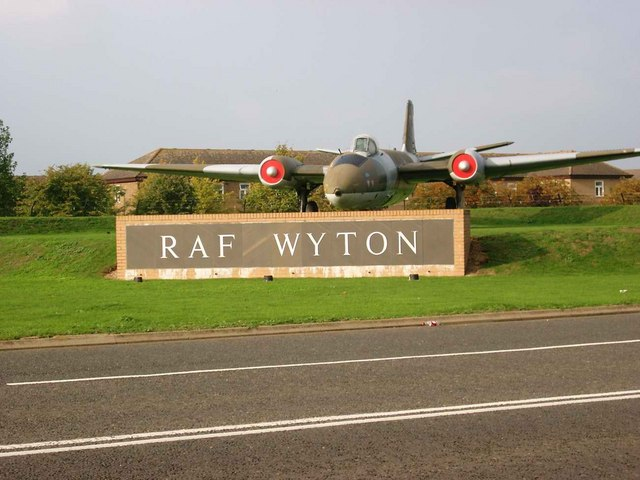
- Entrance to RAF Wyton

- Location within Cambridgeshire
- Population: 964 (2001)
- OS grid reference: TL286736
- District: Huntingdonshire
- Shire county: Cambridgeshire
- Region: East
- Country: England
- Sovereign state: United Kingdom
- Post town: HUNTINGDON
- Postcode district: PE28
- Dialling code: 01480
- Police: Cambridgeshire
- Fire: Cambridgeshire
- Ambulance: East of England
- UK Parliament: Huntingdon

Wyton on the Hill is a village and civil parish in Cambridgeshire, England. Wyton on the Hill lies approximately 3 miles (5 km) north-east of Huntingdon and 1 mile (2 km) north of Houghton. Wyton on the Hill is situated within Huntingdonshire which is a non-metropolitan district of Cambridgeshire as well as being a historic county of England. The parish centres on RAF Wyton and the majority of its residents are servicemen and their families.

== History ==
Wyton on the Hill is one of the county's newest parishes, having been created in 2010 following the sale to Annington Homes of much of the former service accommodation at RAF Wyton.

== Government ==
As a civil parish, Wyton on the Hill has a parish council. The parish council is elected by the residents of the parish who have registered on the electoral roll; the parish council is the lowest tier of government in England. A parish council is responsible for providing and maintaining a variety of local services including allotments and a cemetery; grass cutting and tree planting within public open spaces such as a village green or playing fields. The parish council reviews all planning applications that might affect the parish and makes recommendations to Huntingdonshire District Council, which is the local planning authority for the parish. The parish council also represents the views of the parish on issues such as local transport, policing and the environment. The parish council raises its own tax to pay for these services, known as the parish precept, which is collected as part of the Council Tax.

Wyton on the Hill was in the historic and administrative county of Huntingdonshire until 1965. From 1965, the village was part of the new administrative county of Huntingdon and Peterborough. Then in 1974, following the Local Government Act 1972, Wyton on the Hill became a part of the county of Cambridgeshire.

The second tier of local government is Huntingdonshire District Council which is a non-metropolitan district of Cambridgeshire and has its headquarters in Huntingdon. Huntingdonshire District Council has 52 councillors representing 29 district wards. Huntingdonshire District Council collects the council tax, and provides services such as building regulations, local planning, environmental health, leisure and tourism. Wyton on the Hill is a part of the district ward of Upwood and The Raveleys and is represented on the district council by one councillor. District councillors serve for four-year terms following elections to Huntingdonshire District Council.

For Wyton on the Hill the highest tier of local government is Cambridgeshire County Council which has administration buildings in Cambridge. The county council provides county-wide services such as major road infrastructure, fire and rescue, education, social services, libraries and heritage services. Cambridgeshire County Council consists of 69 councillors representing 60 electoral divisions. Wyton on the Hill is part of the electoral division of Warboys and Upwood and is represented on the county council by one councillor.

At Westminster Wyton on the Hill is in the parliamentary constituency of North West Cambridgeshire, and elects one Member of Parliament (MP) by the first past the post system of election. Wyton on the Hill is represented in the House of Commons by Shailesh Vara (Conservative). Shailesh Vara has represented the constituency since 2005. The previous member of parliament was Brian Mawhinney (Conservative) who represented the constituency between 1997 and 2005.

== Demography ==
=== Population ===
The population at the UK census in 2011 was 1,383.

In 2011, the parish covered an area of 2,291 acres (927 hectares) and the population density of Wyton on the Hill in 2011 was 386.3 persons per square mile (149.2 persons per square kilometre).

== Culture and community ==
Wyton on the Hill has its own primary school and nursery, attended by the families of both servicemen and civilians.

Mrs Susan Brown is now Chairperson of the Wyton on the Hill Parish Council (2018).

The airfield is now being developed as storage area for vehicles. The housing development planned by Crest Nicholson is not viable. The current infrastructure is not capable of supporting this kind of venture.
