= Ashley, Cambridgeshire =

Village in Cambridgeshire, England

Coordinates: 52.22°N 00.47°E

Ashley
- Location within Cambridgeshire
- Population: 749
- OS grid reference: TL6961
  - London: 56 miles (90 km)
- District: East Cambridgeshire
- Shire county: Cambridgeshire
- Region: East
- Country: England
- Sovereign state: United Kingdom
- Post town: Newmarket
- Postcode district: CB8
- Dialling code: 01638
- Police: Cambridgeshire
- Fire: Cambridgeshire
- Ambulance: East of England
- UK Parliament: South East Cambridgeshire

Ashley is a village and civil parish in the East Cambridgeshire district of Cambridgeshire, England, about 4 miles (6.4 km) east of Newmarket. The modern village consists of the two ancient parishes of Ashley and Silverley. Ashley covers 2,250 acres (910 ha) and in the 2011 census had a population of 749. Ashley is in the electoral area of Cheveley ward.

== History ==
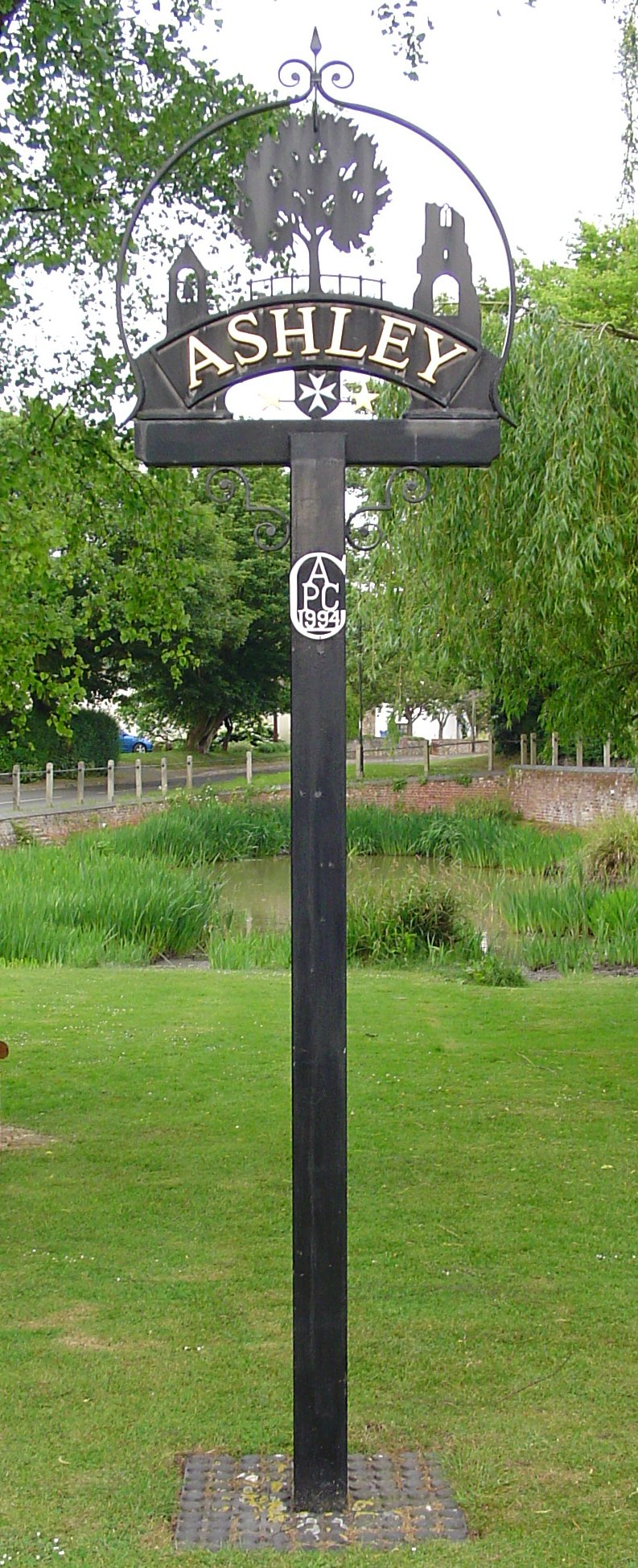
Signpost in Ashley

Ashley and Silverley were both mentioned in the Domesday Book. In 1086 Silverley had a total population of 22 households and had land for 8 plough teams. The Domesday Book does not give the population of Ashley, but Ashley only had land for 4 plough teams. In 1086, the tenant-in-chief in both Ashley and Silverley was Aubrey de Vere.

In the 13th century, the manors of both Ashley and Silverley were owned by the Knights Hospitallers of Chippenham. Silverley was the larger of the two villages and so the villages at that time were known as Silverley cum Ashley. However, since the Hospitaller's manor house was situated in Ashley, by the end of the 13th century the villages became known as Ashley cum Silverley.

Following the dissolution of the monasteries in 1540, the Crown gave the manor at Ashley to Edward North of Kirtling.

The ecclesiastical parishes of St Mary in Ashley and of All Saints in Silverley were united c.1550.

There was a church dedicated to St Mary in the village of Ashley by the 13th century that was abandoned in the late 16th century and was in ruins by 1705. In Silverley there was a church dedicated to All Saints by 1447 that was also abandoned in the 16th century and by 1752 only the tower and some bits of wall remained. The tower remains to the present day.

There was a Hospittaler chapel in the village of Ashley that was dedicated to St. John and from c. 1550, this chapel was used as the parish church for Ashley and Silverley. Following the opening of the new parish church in 1845, the chapel was then used as a school; it was demolished c.1956.

A new parish church dedicated to Holy Trinity was opened in 1845; in 1872 when it was enlarged and then dedicated to St Mary. There are some pictures and a description of the church at the Cambridgeshire Churches website.

== Transport ==
Ashley lies on the B1063, 4.1 miles (6.6 km) away from the A14, making it easy to commute to the nearby larger settlement of Bury St Edmunds.

The nearest railway station is 5.5 miles (8.9 km) away in Newmarket, served by trains to Cambridge and Ipswich.

The Icknield Way Path passes through the village on its 110 miles (180 km) journey from Ivinghoe Beacon in Buckinghamshire to Knettishall Heath in Suffolk. The Icknield Way Trail, a multi-user route for walkers, horse riders and off-road cyclists also passes through the village.

== Facilities ==
By 1764 there were two public houses, The Crown and The Plough. The Crown is no longer open as a pub (closed during covid) but in the 1980s The Plough become The Old Plough and is now a restaurant.

There is a village store on the High Street and a village hall, called the Ashley Pavilion, which is adjacent to the recreation ground and children's play area.
