= Wisbech Rural District =

Former local government area in the UK

Coordinates: 52.666°N 0.159°E

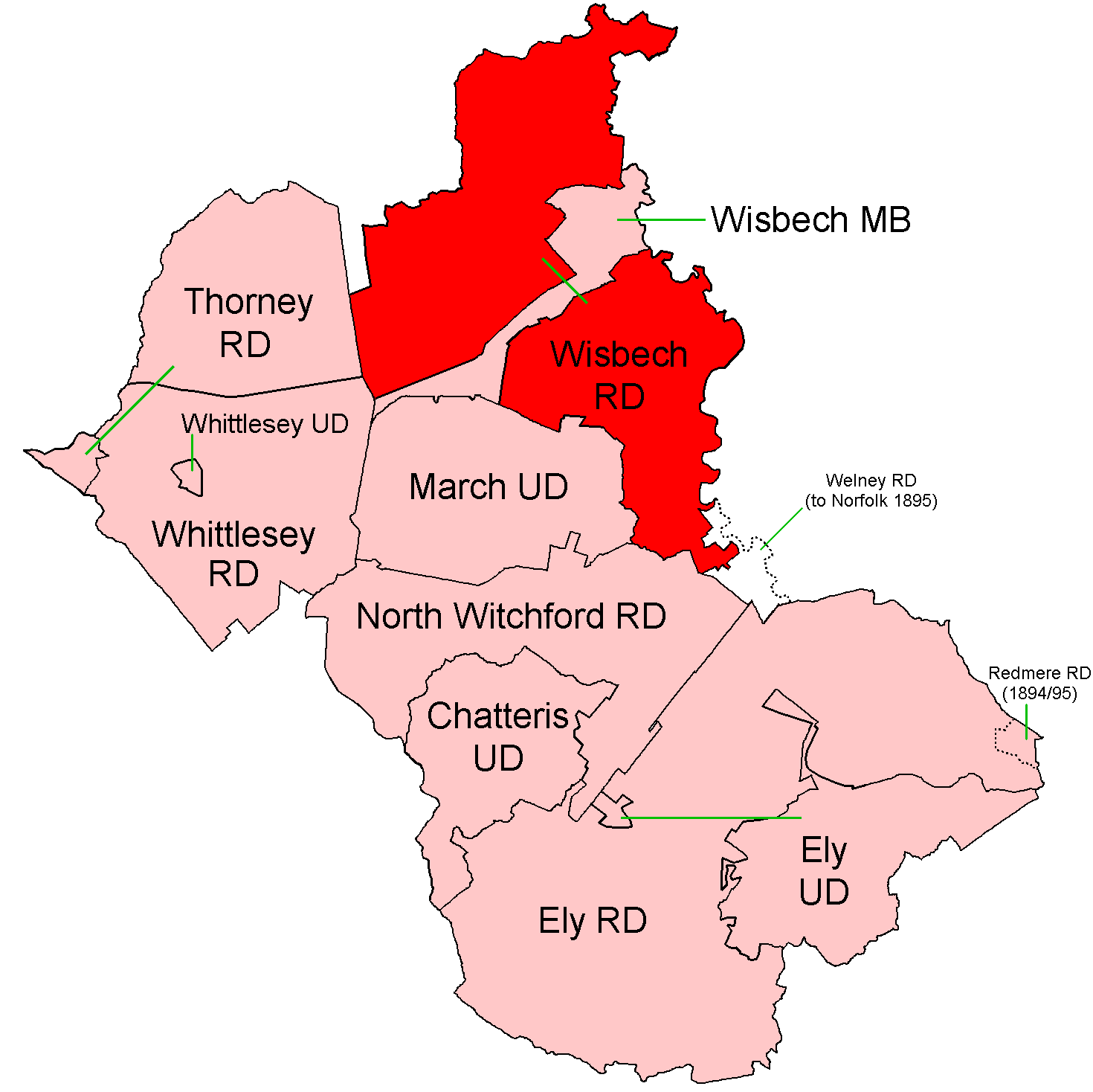
Boundaries in 1894 within the Isle of Ely

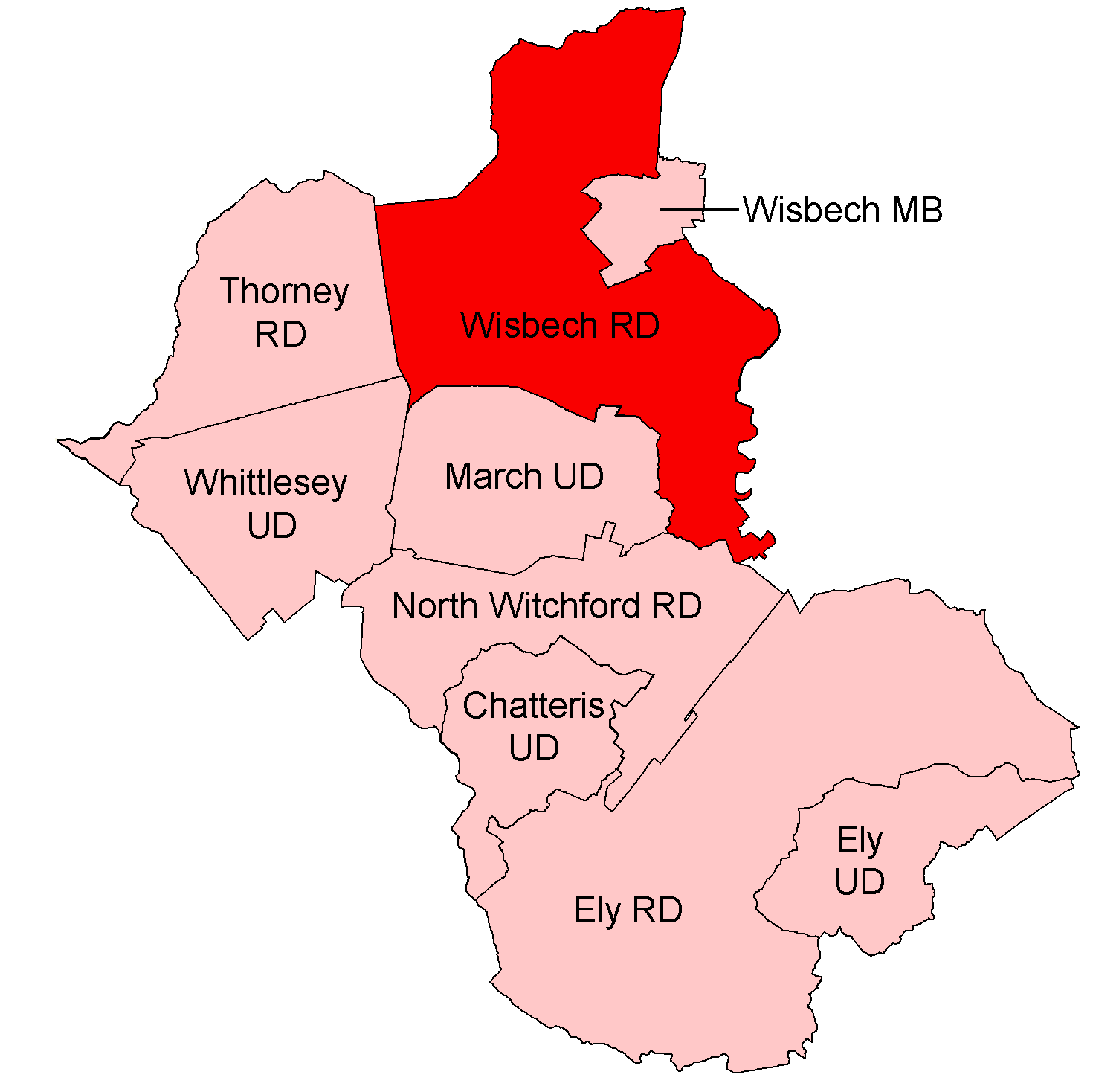
Boundaries in 1935 within the Isle of Ely

Wisbech was a rural district in Cambridgeshire in England from 1894 to 1974.

It was formed from that part of the Wisbech rural sanitary district in the Isle of Ely, Cambridgeshire, by the Local Government Act 1894. It covered the parishes of Elm, Leverington, Outwell, Parson Drove, Tydd St Giles, Upwell, and Wisbech St Mary.

The offices were in Alexandra Road, Wisbech.

When first created, the district consisted of two detached parts separated by the long, narrow tail of Wisbech Municipal Borough. In 1933, the south-western part of Wisbech MB was transferred to the parish of Elm, leaving Wisbech RD surrounding the town on three sides.

From its creation until 1965, it formed part of the administrative county of Isle of Ely, which merged to form part of Cambridgeshire and Isle of Ely.

In 1974, the district was abolished under the Local Government Act 1972 and became part of the Fenland district.

== Coat of Arms ==
ARMS: Barry wavy of eight Argent and Vert a Cornucopia erect Or the fruit proper all within a Bordure Gules charged with eight Ducal Coronets Gold.

CREST: Out of a Circlet Argent charged with three Mullets Sable a demi Lion also Argent gorged with a Ducal Coronet Or and supporting a Staff of the first flying therefrom a Banner Azure charged with a Lily Flower also Argent; Mantled Vert doubled Argent.

Motto 'THESAUROS IN AGRO' - For we have treasures in the field.

Granted 11 October 1954.
