= Sapley =

Area of Huntingdon, Cambridgeshire, England

Coordinates: 52.35021°N 0.1761°W

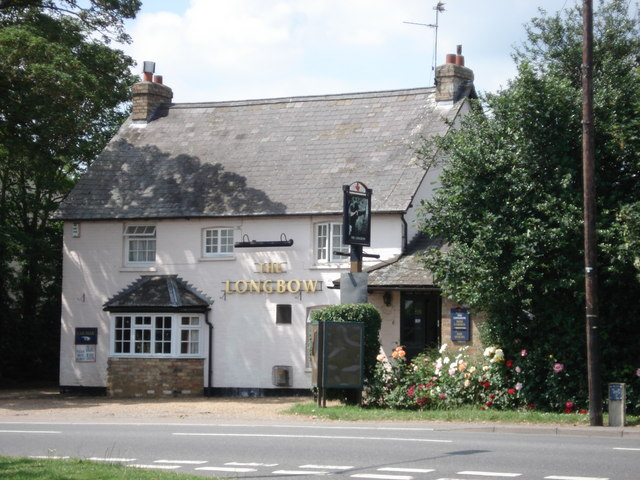
- The Longbow public house, Sapley

- Location within Cambridgeshire
- Civil parish: Huntingdon
- District: Huntingdonshire
- Shire county: Cambridgeshire
- Region: East
- Country: England
- Sovereign state: United Kingdom
- Post town: HUNTINGDON
- Postcode district: PE28
- Dialling code: 01480
- Police: Cambridgeshire
- Fire: Cambridgeshire
- Ambulance: East of England
- UK Parliament: Huntingdon

Sapley is a historic village, now a suburb of Huntingdon, in the Huntingdonshire district of Cambridgeshire, England.

== History ==
The historic Sapley Forest was owned by the Cromwell family.

Until 1858 Sapley was an extra-parochial area, in 1851 the extra-parochial area had a population of 13.

Sapley Park is the main area of Sapley. In May 2017, a memorial was unveiled in Sapley Park dedicated to the Oxmoor plane crash.

== See also ==
- Hundreds of Huntingdonshire
