= Alconbury Weston =

Village and civil parish in Cambridgeshire, England

Coordinates: 52.3771°N 0.27025°W

- Location within Cambridgeshire
- Population: 800 (2011)
- OS grid reference: TL1776
- District: Huntingdonshire
- Shire county: Cambridgeshire
- Region: East
- Country: England
- Sovereign state: United Kingdom
- Post town: Huntingdon
- Postcode district: PE28
- Police: Cambridgeshire
- Fire: Cambridgeshire
- Ambulance: East of England
- UK Parliament: Huntingdon

Alconbury Weston – in Huntingdonshire (now part of Cambridgeshire), England – is a village and civil parish, lying just outside of the Fens, having just a few hills, but a significant change to the flat of the Fens. Alconbury Weston is situated 6.5 miles (10.5 km) north-west of Huntingdon.

== History ==
Alconbury Weston was listed as Westune in the Domesday Book in the Hundred of Leightonstone in Huntingdonshire; the name of the settlement was written in the Domesday Book. In 1086 there was just one manor at Alconbury Weston; the annual rent paid to the lord of the manor in 1066 had been £1 and the rent was the same in 1086. There were four households with an estimated population of 14 to 20. There was one ploughland at Alconbury Weston in 1086 and that there was the capacity for a further one ploughland, and a total tax assessed of one geld.

== Government ==
Alconbury Weston parish council is the lowest tier of government and consists of seven members. The second tier of local government is Huntingdonshire District Council which is a non-metropolitan district of Cambridgeshire and has its headquarters in Huntingdon. Alconbury Weston is a part of the district ward of Alconbury and The Stukeleys and is represented on the district council by one councillor. The highest tier of local government is Cambridgeshire County Council. Alconbury Weston is a part of the electoral division of Huntingdon and is represented on the county council by two councillors.

Alconbury Weston was in the historic and administrative county of Huntingdonshire until 1965. From 1965, the village was part of the new administrative county of Huntingdon and Peterborough. Then in 1974, following the Local Government Act 1972, Alconbury Weston became a part of the county of Cambridgeshire.

At Westminster, Alconbury Weston is in the parliamentary constituency of Huntingdon. Since 2001 Alconbury Weston has been represented in the House of Commons by Jonathan Djanogly (Conservative).

== Geography ==
The Alconbury Brook runs through the village then through Alconbury and on into Hinchingbrooke Park. The brook has a history of flooding, with the village being affected numerous times in the 20th and 21st centuries.

=== Climate ===
The climate in the United Kingdom is defined as a temperate oceanic climate, or Cfb on the Köppen climate classification system, a classification it shares with most of northwest Europe. Eastern areas of the United Kingdom, such as East Anglia, are drier, cooler, less windy and also experience the greatest daily and seasonal temperature variations. Protected from the cool onshore coastal breezes further to the east of the region, Cambridgeshire is warm in summer, and cold and frosty in winter.

The nearest Met Office climate station to Alconbury Weston is at Monks Wood, which is 2.2 miles (3.5 km) to the north-east. The average annual rainfall for the United Kingdom between 1981 and 2010 was 1,154 millimetres (45.4 in) but Cambridgeshire is one of the driest counties with around half of the national level. Regional weather forecasting and historical summaries are available from the UK Met Office. Additional local weather stations report periodic figures to the internet such as Weather Underground, Inc.

Climate data for Monks Wood, elevation 41m, (1981–2010 averages)
Month	Jan	Feb	Mar	Apr	May	Jun	Jul	Aug	Sep	Oct	Nov	Dec	Year
Mean daily maximum °C (°F)	7.2 (45.0)	7.7 (45.9)	10.7 (51.3)	13.5 (56.3)	16.8 (62.2)	19.7 (67.5)	22.4 (72.3)	22.3 (72.1)	19.2 (66.6)	15.0 (59.0)	10.3 (50.5)	7.4 (45.3)	14.4 (57.9)
Mean daily minimum °C (°F)	1.1 (34.0)	0.8 (33.4)	2.6 (36.7)	3.8 (38.8)	6.6 (43.9)	9.7 (49.5)	11.8 (53.2)	11.7 (53.1)	9.9 (49.8)	7.0 (44.6)	3.9 (39.0)	1.9 (35.4)	5.9 (42.6)
Average rainfall mm (inches)	47.0 (1.85)	35.0 (1.38)	40.1 (1.58)	47.0 (1.85)	47.9 (1.89)	54.1 (2.13)	48.3 (1.90)	51.7 (2.04)	53.3 (2.10)	60.2 (2.37)	54.2 (2.13)	47.1 (1.85)	585.8 (23.06)
Mean monthly sunshine hours	58.0	77.4	109.9	152.3	186.2	180.6	193.3	188.1	142.5	114.6	67.0	52.4	1,522.2
Source: Met Office Monks Wood, Cambridgeshire

== Demography ==
=== Population ===
In the period 1801 to 1901 the population of Alconbury Weston was recorded every ten years by the UK census. During this time the population was in the range of 281 (the lowest in 1801) and 561 (the highest in 1861).

From 1901, a census was taken every ten years with the exception of 1941 (due to the Second World War).

Parish	1911	1921	1931	1951	1961	1971	1981	1991	2001	2011
Alconbury Weston	319	327	276	254	297	476	645	744	793	800

All population census figures from report Historic Census figures Cambridgeshire to 2011 by Cambridgeshire Insight.

In 2011, the parish covered an area of 1,732 acres (701 hectares) and so the population density for Alconbury Weston in 2011 was 295.6 persons per square mile (114.1 per square kilometre).

== Culture and community ==
The brook is home to a number of water birds such as Mallard, Swan and Wren and the stream is also home to small fish such as Roach and also larger predatory fish such as Pike.

The village used to contain a Butchers, Farm Shop, Freezer Shop, post office and Master Saddlers which have all now shut down. It has one pub, The White Hart

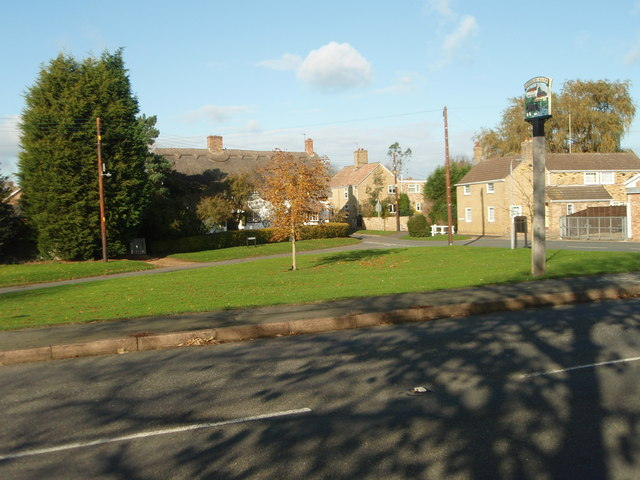
Village Green Alconbury Weston

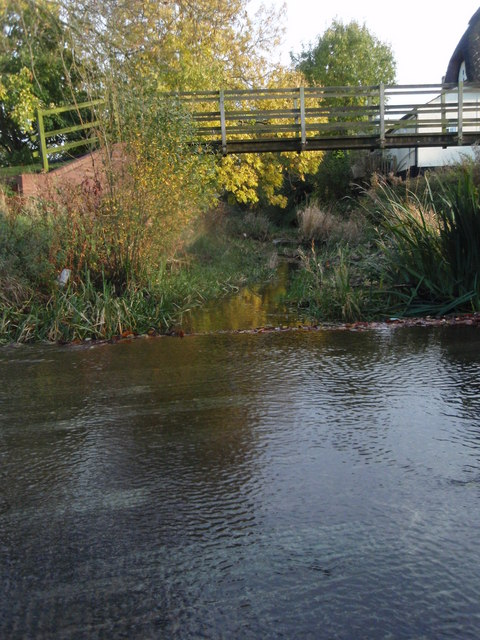
Down Stream on the Alconbury Brook

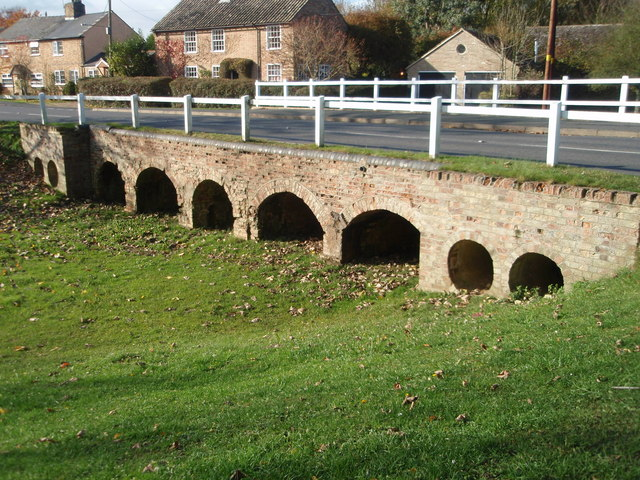
Flood Water Culvert Alconbury Weston
