= Welches Dam =

Hamlet in Cambridgeshire, England

Coordinates: 52.4517°N 0.165°E

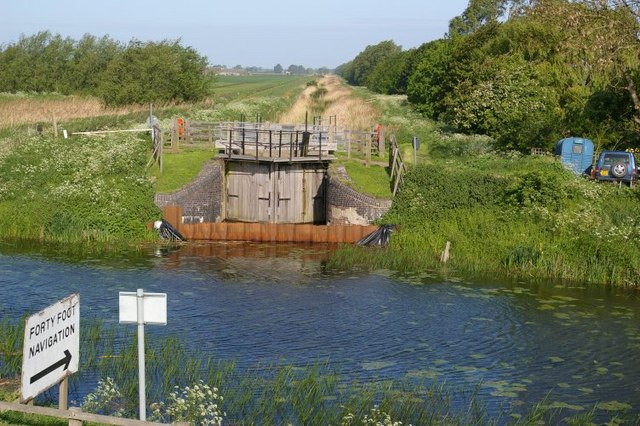

- Location within Cambridgeshire
- Civil parish: Manea
- District: Fenland
- Shire county: Cambridgeshire
- Region: East
- Country: England
- Sovereign state: United Kingdom
- Post town: MARCH
- Postcode district: PE15
- Dialling code: 01354
- UK Parliament: North East Cambridgeshire

Welches Dam is a hamlet and former civil parish, now in the parish of Manea, in the Fenland district, in the county of Cambridgeshire, England. It is around 5 miles (8 km) to the north west of Ely. The parish covered an area of 2,355 acres (953 ha). Within the parish boundaries were the hamlet of the same name and the settlement of Purls Bridge. In 1951 the parish had a population of 69. Welches Dam is the site of the visitor centre for the RSPB Ouse Washes reserve.

The parish of Welches Dam was surrounded by those of Coveney, Manea, Mepal, and Witcham.

== History ==
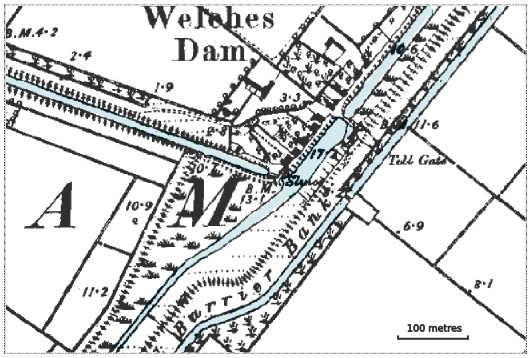
Welches Dam in 1892

The history of the parish is tied to that of The Fens and the battle to drain it in the first half of the 17th century. The original principal drainage channel for the area, the Old Bedford River, ran through the parish.

The parish's name derived from Edward Welsh who built a dam across the Bedford River. Welsh was an employee of the Adventurers, the 17th-century entrepreneurs who invested in the results of Vermuyden's efforts to drain the fens.

Fortrey Hall, the 17th-century ancestral seat of the Fortrey family, lay in the parish.

In 1849, 11 of the 187 residents of the parish died in an outbreak of cholera.

Welches Dam was formerly an extra-parochial tract, from 1858 Welches Dam was a civil parish in its own right, on 1 April 1960 the parish was abolished and merged with Manea and Chatteris.

== Church ==
The mission church of St Eanswythe was built in 1909.
