= Coveney, Cambridgeshire =

Village in England

Coordinates: 52.42°N 0.2°E

Coveney
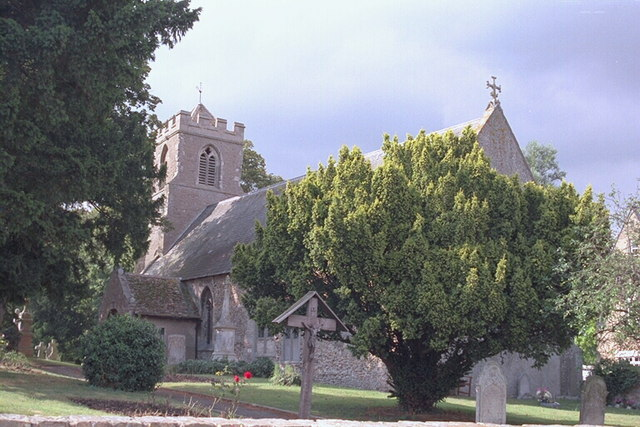
- St Peter ad Vincula church

- Location within Cambridgeshire
- Population: 424 (Including Wardy Hill. 2011)
- OS grid reference: TL496821
- Civil parish: Coveney
- District: East Cambridgeshire
- Shire county: Cambridgeshire
- Region: East
- Country: England
- Sovereign state: United Kingdom
- Post town: Ely
- Postcode district: CB6
- Police: Cambridgeshire
- Fire: Cambridgeshire
- Ambulance: East of England

Coveney is a village and civil parish northwest of Ely, in the East Cambridgeshire district, in Cambridgeshire, England. In 2011 the parish had a population of 424.

Coveney is on a small Fen 'island' rising to 43 feet (13 m) above sea level, some 3.5 miles (6 km) west from Ely city as the crow flies, but nearly twice that distance by the main road. The village is situated on a by-road which leaves the main Ely–Chatteris road at Wentworth crossroads, about 2 miles (3 km) south. This by-road, which has a branch to the hamlet of Wardy Hill, 1 mile (2 km) west of Coveney village, used to be the only metalled road into the parish. But the droves across Ely West Fen, by Frogs Abbey, to Downham Hythe, and from Wardy Hill to Witcham have recently been made up for wheeled traffic.

The Church of England parish church of St Peter ad Vincula is a Grade I listed building.

Several artefacts from the late Bronze Age have been found here, including bronze axes, shields and a few swords.
