= Southoe and Midloe =

- Civil parish
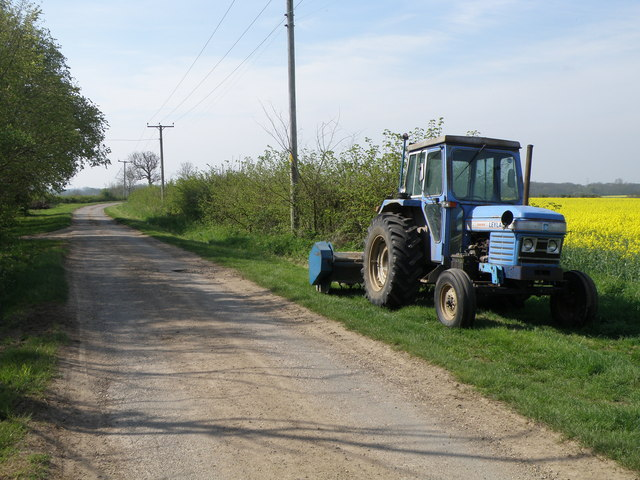
- Roadside view near Common Barn, near to Southoe, Cambridgeshire, Great Britain. The tractor is a Leyland Synchro with a flail mower attached.
- Interactive map of Southoe and Midloe
- Coordinates: 52°16′5″N 0°16′57″W
- Country: England
- Primary council: Huntingdonshire District Council
- County: Cambridgeshire
- Region: East of England
- Status: Parish

Government
  - Type: Parish Council

Southoe and Midloe is a small civil parish in Cambridgeshire, England. The parish comprises the small village of Southoe and the even smaller settlement of Midloe. The two settlements are situated within Huntingdonshire which is a non-metropolitan district of Cambridgeshire as well as being a historic county of England.

== Government ==
The civil parish of Southoe and Midloe, which has a parish council. The parish council is elected by the residents of the parish who have registered on the electoral roll; the parish council is the lowest tier of government in England. A parish council is responsible for providing and maintaining a variety of local services including allotments and a cemetery; grass cutting and tree planting within public open spaces such as a village green or playing fields. The parish council reviews all planning applications that might affect the parish and makes recommendations to Huntingdonshire District Council, which is the local planning authority for the parish. The parish council also represents the views of the parish on issues such as local transport, policing and the environment. The parish council raises its own tax to pay for these services, known as the parish precept, which is collected as part of the Council Tax. The parish council comprises seven councillors; the council normally meets on the first Wednesday of the month in the village hall.

Southoe and Midloe were in the historic and administrative county of Huntingdonshire until 1965. From 1965, the villages were part of the new administrative county of Huntingdon and Peterborough. Then in 1974, following the Local Government Act 1972, they became a part of the county of Cambridgeshire.

The second tier of local government is Huntingdonshire District Council which is a non-metropolitan district of Cambridgeshire and has its headquarters in Huntingdon. Huntingdonshire District Council has 52 councillors representing 29 district wards. Huntingdonshire District Council collects the council tax, and provides services such as building regulations, local planning, environmental health, leisure and tourism. Southoe and Midloe are part of the district ward of Buckden and are represented on the district council by one councillor. District councillors serve for four-year terms following elections to Huntingdonshire District Council.

For Southoe and Midloe, the highest tier of local government is Cambridgeshire County Council which has administration buildings in Cambridge. The county council provides county-wide services such as major road infrastructure, fire and rescue, education, social services, libraries and heritage services. Cambridgeshire County Council consists of 69 councillors representing 60 electoral divisions. Southoe and Midloe are part of the electoral division of Buckden, Gransden and The Offords and are represented on the county council by one councillor.

At Westminster Southoe and Midloe are in the parliamentary constituency of Huntingdon, and elect one Member of Parliament (MP) by the first past the post system of election. Southoe and Midloe are represented in the House of Commons by Jonathan Djanogly (Conservative). Jonathan Djanogly has represented the constituency since 2001. The previous member of parliament was John Major (Conservative) who represented the constituency between 1983 and 2001.

== Demography ==
=== Population ===
In the period 1801 to 1901 the population of Midloe was recorded every ten years by the UK census. During this time the population was in the range of 30 (the lowest was in 1801) and 53 (the highest was in 1841). In the same period the population of Southoe was in the range of 213 (the lowest was in 1901) and 307 (the highest was in 1851).

From 1901, a census was taken every ten years with the exception of 1941 (due to the Second World War).

Parish	1911	1921	1931	1951	1961	1971	1981	1991	2001	2011
Midloe	37	33	40							
Southoe	229	214	211							
Southoe and Midloe	266	247	251	267	225	269	428	455	408	349

All population census figures from report Historic Census figures Cambridgeshire to 2011 by Cambridgeshire Insight.

The two separate parishes of Southoe and of Midloe were combined into a single parish between 1931 and 1951.

In 2011, the parish covered an area of 2,377 acres (962 hectares)
