= Offord =

Offord is a toponymic surname of Old English origin for people from The Offords villages in Cambridgeshire. Notable people with the surname include:

- Bo Offord, American politician and health administrator
- Cyril Offord (1908–2000), British mathematician
- Eddy Offord (born 1943), English record producer
- John Offord (died 1349), Archbishop of Canterbury
- Kieran Offord (born 2004), Scottish footballer
- Lenore Glen Offord (1905–1991), American author
- Luke Offord (born 1999), English footballer
- Malcolm Offord (born 1964), Scottish financier and politician
- Matthew Offord (born 1969), British politician (Reform), MP for Hendon
- Na'eem Offord, American football player
- Raymond Offord (1931–2011), British air commodore
- Sam Offord (born 1986), Australian gymnast
- Willie Offord (born 1978), American football player (Minnesota Vikings)

== See also ==
- The Offords
- Offord Cluny and Offord D'Arcy, which form The Offords
- Offord and Buckden railway station, a former station which served Buckden and The Offords
- Hofford
