= The Offords =

Pair of villages in Cambridgeshire, England

Coordinates: 52.286°N 0.213°W

Offord Cluny and Offord D'Arcy
- Location within Cambridgeshire
- Population: 1,341 (2011)
- OS grid reference: TL 21958 66803
- Civil parish: Offord Cluny and Offord D'Arcy
- District: Huntingdonshire
- Shire county: Cambridgeshire
- Region: East
- Country: England
- Sovereign state: United Kingdom
- Post town: ST. NEOTS
- Postcode district: PE19
- Dialling code: 01480
- Police: Cambridgeshire
- Fire: Cambridgeshire
- Ambulance: East of England
- UK Parliament: Huntingdon

The Offords is the name given to the two villages of Offord Cluny and Offord D'Arcy, situated on the east bank of the River Great Ouse between Saint Neots and Huntingdon in west Cambridgeshire. The Offords were both recorded in the Domesday Book as 'Upeforde' under two different landowners, which suggests they were one village at that time. By the 13th Century they had evolved into two distinct settlements, and remained so until the proximity and resulting close co-operation of the two villages lead to their merger in 2010. In 2008 the Parish Councils merged, and in 2010 the Huntingdon (Parishes) Order 2009 officially created the new Parish of 'Offord Cluny and Offord D'Arcy'.

== Origins ==
The name 'Offord' originates from the name found in the Domesday Book 'Upeforde', which in turn is believed to be derived from the Old English pre 7th Century "uppe", up (stream), and "ford", ford. The name 'Cluny' comes from Cluny Abbey in the Bourgogne region of France, which were granted a manor in Offord by Arnulf de Hesding some time before 1086. The name 'D'Arcy' is first mentioned in records when, in 1279 "William de Broughton was holding a manor, with a common fishery, in Offord Darcy of the Abbot of Ramsey".

== Today ==
Today the Offords have an estimated population of 1,240; in the 2001 census Offord Cluny had a population of 502 and Offord D'Arcy a population of 747. The parish church shared by the Offords is All Saints in Offord Cluny, a Grade II* listed building dating back to the 13th Century. Baptism, weddings and funerals are held there along with a monthly family service. Offord Village Hall provides a meeting place for (amongst others) the Offord Players (the local amateur dramatics group), the Offord Gardeners Association, the Mums and Tots group and on occasion the 'Cotton Farm Action Group'.

The community is served by two garages (a MOT test and servicing centre and a TVR/Noble Automotive garage), a village store and two pubs (the Swan Inn and the Horseshoe Inn & Restaurant). Local children can attend the Offord Primary school, ranked in the top five in Cambridgeshire. There are a number of events held throughout the year including the Offord Film Festival, the Offord Dog Show and the Offord Music Festival, the last two of which are held at Millennium Green, the local village green. There is an equestrian centre providing riding instruction and livery service, and a local angling club which fishes the river Great Ouse in and around the villages.

== Demography ==
=== Population ===
In the period 1801 to 1901 the population of Offord Cluny was recorded every ten years by the UK census. During this time the population was in the range of 170 (the lowest was in 1801) and 369 (the highest was in 1851). At the same time, the population of Offord D'Arcy was in the range of 156 (the lowest was in 1801) and 437 (the highest was in 1861).

From 1901, a census was taken every ten years with the exception of 1941 (due to the Second World War).

Parish	1911	1921	1931	1951	1961	1971	1981	1991	2001	2011
Offord Cluny	221	205	217	242	321	505	453	434	502	
Offord D'Arcy	358	293	291	295	295	453	624	746	747	
The Offords	579	498	508	537	616	958	1,077	1,180	1,249	1,341

All population census figures from report Historic Census figures Cambridgeshire to 2011 by Cambridgeshire Insight.

== See also ==
- St Peter's Church, Offord D'Arcy
