= Offord and Buckden railway station =

Former railway station in Cambridgeshire, England

Coordinates: 52.2892°N 0.2157°W

Offord and Buckden
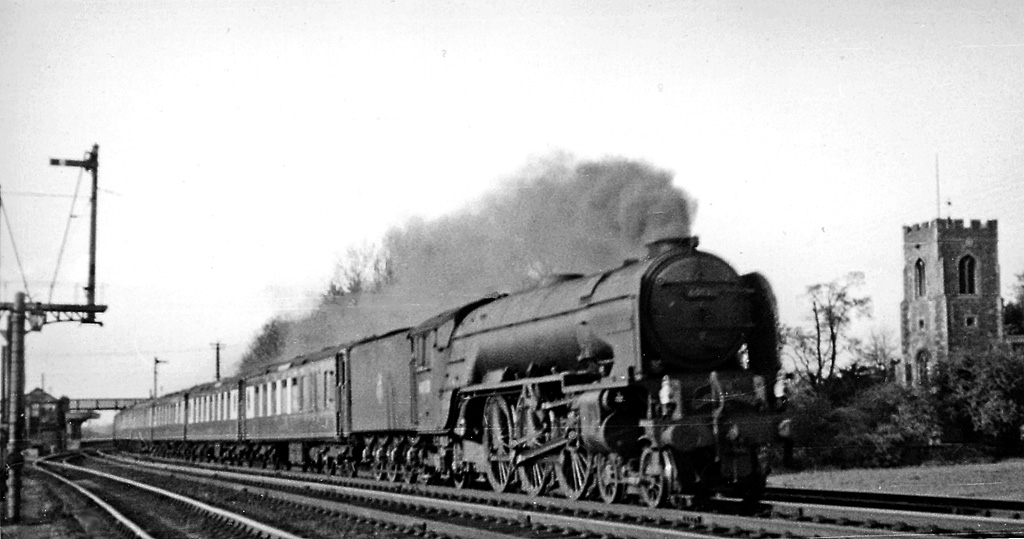
- ECML express passing Offord & Buckden station and All Saint's Church, Offord Cluny in 1955

General information
- Location: Offord Cluny, Huntingdonshire; England
- Grid reference: TL217671

Other information
- Status: Disused

History
- Original company: Great Northern Railway
- Pre-grouping: Great Northern Railway
- Post-grouping: London and North Eastern Railway

Key dates
- September 1851: Opened as Offord
- 1 August 1876: Renamed Offord and Buckden
- 2 February 1959: Closed for passengers
- 26 April 1965: closed for freight
Location

Offord and Buckden railway station was built by the Great Northern Railway to serve the twin villages of Offord Cluny and Offord D'Arcy in Cambridgeshire, England.

== History ==
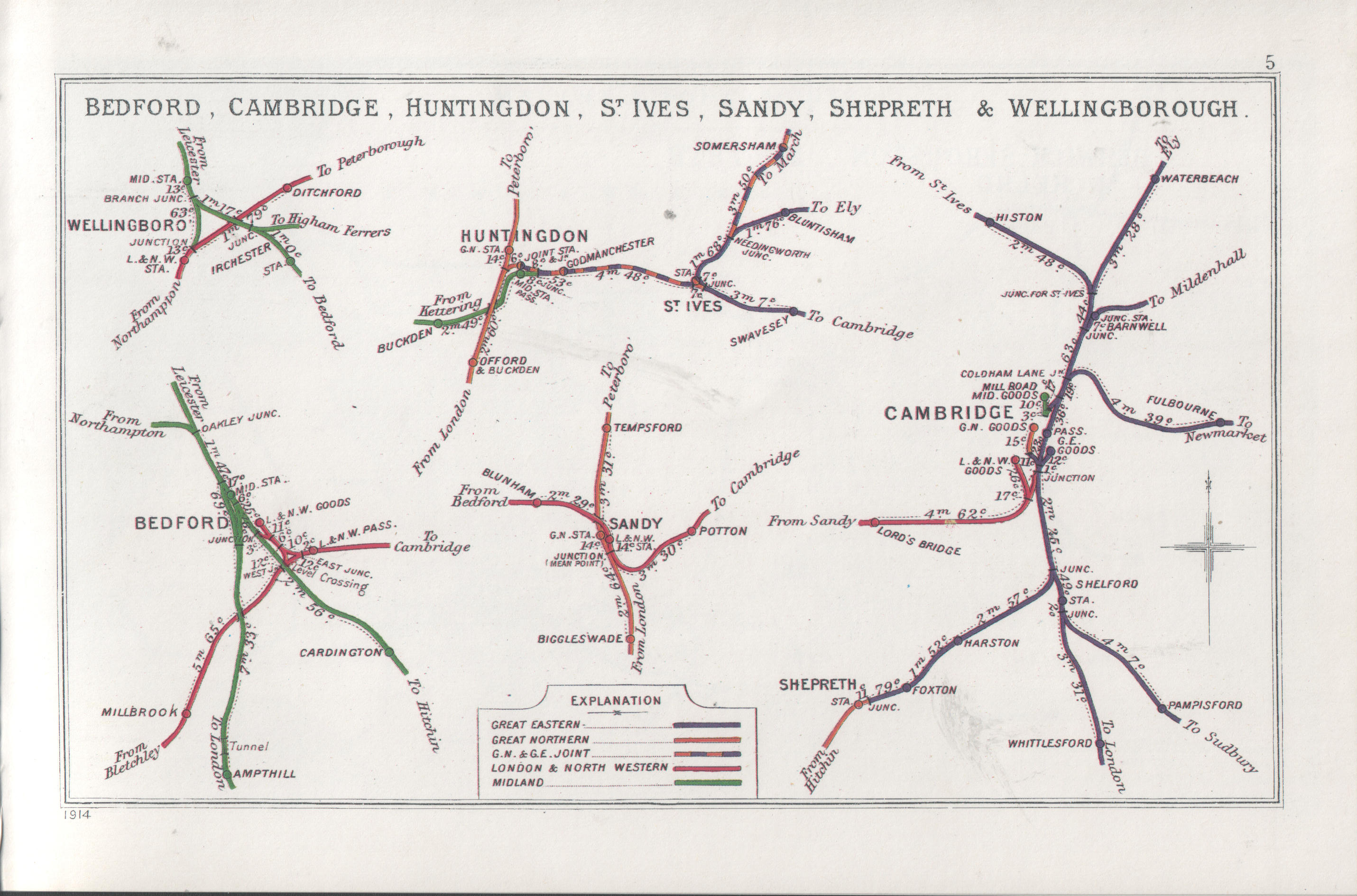
A 1914 Railway Clearing House map showing (upper centre) railways in the vicinity of Offord & Buckden

The Great Northern Railway main line from London to Peterborough had opened in 1850 including stations at St. Neots and Huntingdon. A station between these, named Offord, was opened just over a year later, in September 1851. It was located 56 miles (90 km) from London King's Cross.

On 1 August 1876 the station was renamed Offord and Buckden.

The station closed for passengers on 2 February 1959.

== Route ==
Preceding station	Historical railways	Following station
St. Neots; Line and station open	Great Northern Railway; East Coast Main Line	Huntingdon; Line and station open
