= St Neots railway station =

Railway station in Cambridgeshire, England

Coordinates: 52.232°N 0.247°W

St Neots
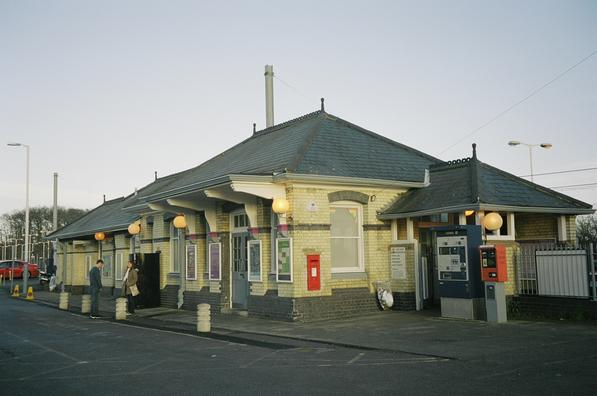
- The entrance to the station

General information
- Location: St Neots; District of Huntingdonshire; England
- Grid reference: TL197607
- Managed by: Great Northern
- Platforms: 4

Other information
- Station code: SNO
- Classification: DfT category D

History
- Opened: 7 August 1850
- Original company: Great Northern Railway
- Pre-grouping: Great Northern Railway
- Post-grouping: London and North Eastern Railway; Eastern Region of British Railways

Passengers
- 2020–21: ▼0.246 million
- 2021–22: ▲0.673 million
- 2022–23: ▲0.886 million
- 2023–24: ▲0.959 million
- 2024–25: ▲1.082 million
Location
Notes
- Passenger statistics from the Office of Rail and Road

St Neots railway station serves the town of St Neots in Cambridgeshire, England. It is located to the east of the town approximately 2 miles (3.2 km) from the town centre. It is on the East Coast Main Line, about 52 miles (83 km) from London King's Cross. The station is managed by Great Northern, although most services are operated by Thameslink.

The station has two large island platforms and four main rail lines, a pair of "up and down" slow lines used by stopping services and a pair of "up and down" fast lines used by fast Great Northern services that stop there during peak times and for high speed services passing through.

== History ==
The first section of the Great Northern Railway (GNR) - that from Louth to a junction with the Manchester, Sheffield and Lincolnshire Railway at Grimsby - opened on 1 March 1848, but the southern section of the main line, between Maiden Lane and Peterborough, was not opened until August 1850. St Neots was one of the original stations, opening with the line on 7 August 1850.

It was the scene of a derailment of a Scottish night express in 1895.

== Facilities ==
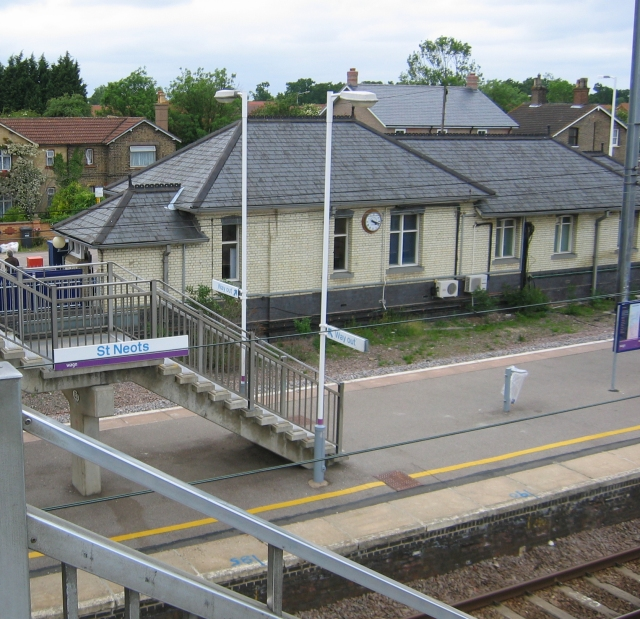
Platforms 1 and 2, with the stations buildings & Ticket Office in the background.

There are toilet facilities at the station and a newsagent/coffee seller in the ticket hall. A taxi office is situated outside the station.

St Neots station has automatic ticket barriers, which were installed in 2008 by former franchise holder First Capital Connect.

== Services ==
Off-peak, all services at St Neots are operated by Thameslink using Class 700 EMUs.

The typical off-peak service in trains per hour is:

- 2 tph to Horsham via London Bridge, Redhill and Gatwick Airport
- 2 tph to Peterborough (all stations)

During the peak hours, the station is served by an additional hourly service between London King's Cross and Peterborough. These services run non-stop between Stevenage and London King's Cross and are operated by Great Northern using Class 387 EMUs.

On Sundays, the service is reduced to hourly and southbound services run to London King's Cross instead of Horsham.

The station is also served by several buses, with routes to the local area and to Cambridge.

Preceding station	National Rail	Following station
Sandy	Thameslink Great Northern Route	Huntingdon
Biggleswade	Great Northern London to Peterborough Peak Hours Only	Huntingdon
	Historical railways	
Tempsford Line open, station closed	Great Northern Railway East Coast Main Line	Offord and Buckden Line open, station closed

== Recent developments ==
A new footbridge opened in February 2014, providing lifts to the platforms and access to the station from both sides of the track including access to the Love's Farm housing development.

== Location ==
St Neots station (in Cambridgeshire)

In the chainage notation traditionally used on the railways, the station is 51 miles 58 chains (83.24 km; 51.73 mi) from London King's Cross.
