= Ceara O'Neill =

English actress and musician

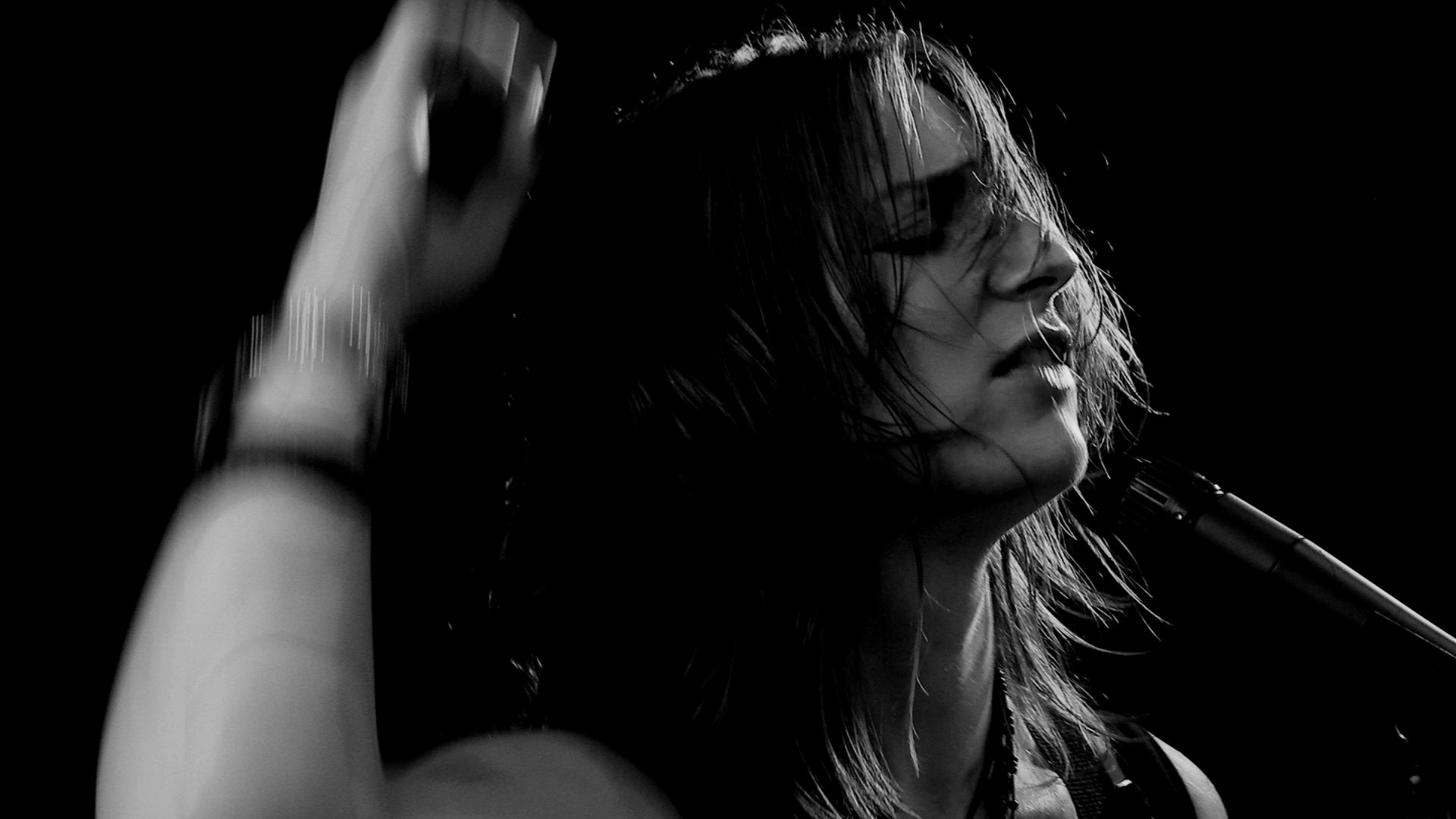
- Born: Huntingdon, Cambridgeshire, England
- Occupations: Actress, musician
- Years active: 2006-present
- Height: 5 ft 6 in (168 cm)
- Website: Kyneska.com

Ceara O'Neill is an English actress and musician. She is notable for her work in television, including Young Victoria, starring Emily Blunt, TV sitcom The Inbetweeners starring Simon Bird, TV sitcom Him and Her, and BBC TV medical series Holby City. Ceara O'Neill is also the guitarist and backing vocalist for all-sister rock band Kyneska.

== Background ==
Ceara O'Neill was born in Huntingdon, Cambridgeshire. She was a gifted tennis player, and the highest ranked player for her age in Britain aged 10&U. In 2001 she reached the finals of the International Tennis Event 'Top 10-12' in Bressuire, France, beating Alizé Cornet in the semi-finals.

In 2004 when aged 14, she turned professional, competing in $10,000 ITF events in Portugal, before turning to a career in acting and music.

== Career ==
- Him & Her (2013) - Paula
- Holby City (2013) - Nurse
- McDonald's Advert (2009) - Voiceover
- The Young Victoria (2009) - Maid
- The Inbetweeners (2008) - Partygoer
- The Knowledge of Beauty (2008) - Jenny
- My Family Christmas Special (2006) - Carol Singer
- Endeavour (2014) - Personal Assistant

== Discography ==
- Album: Emerald Sky - Shadows of Darkness (2008) - Guitarist and backing vocals
