= St Peter's Church, Offord D'Arcy =

Coordinates: 52.2824°N 0.2178°W

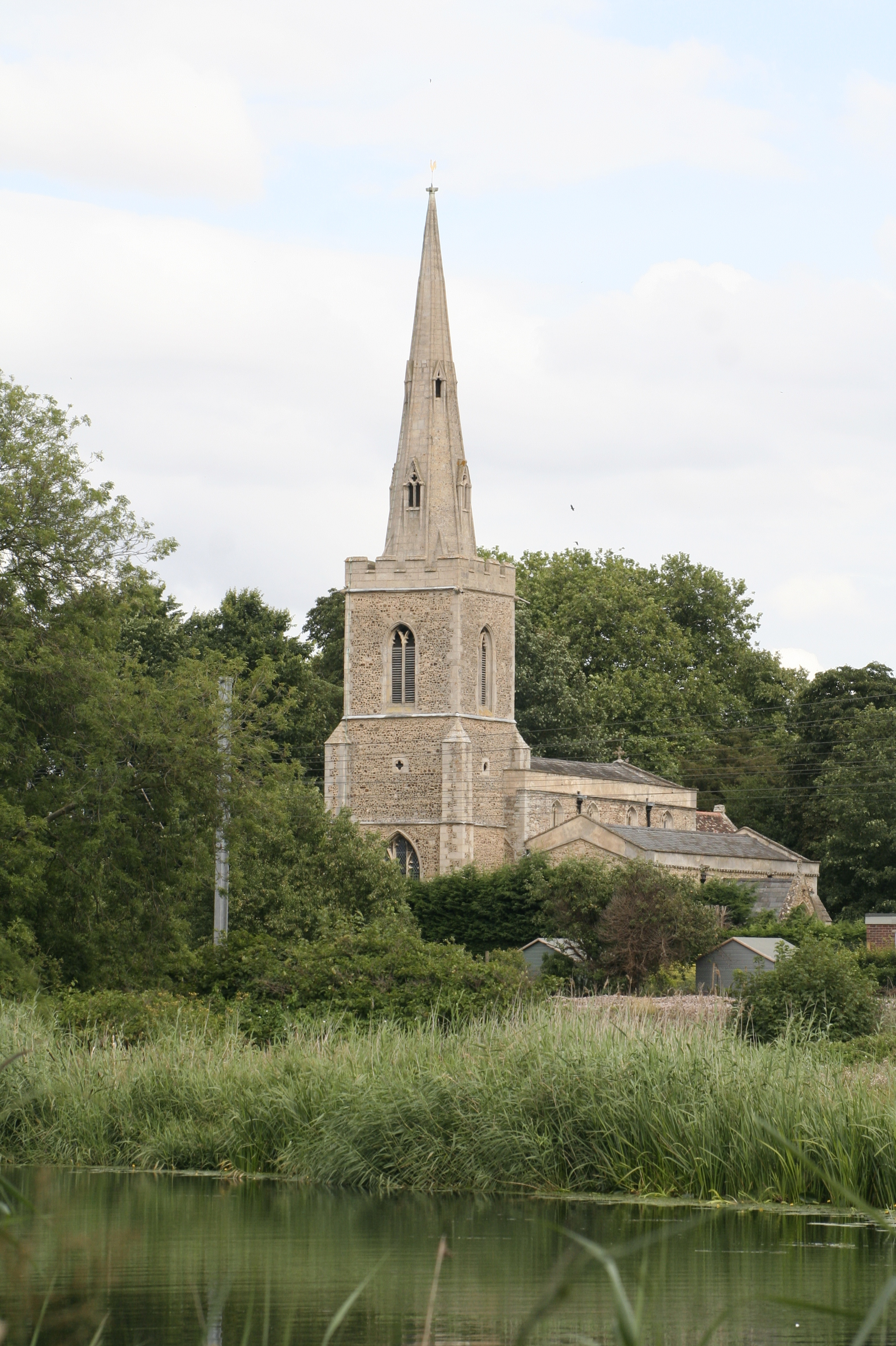
- St Peter's Church, Offord D'Arcy

- Location in Cambridgeshire
- OS grid reference: TL 216 664
- Location: Offord D'Arcy, Cambridgeshire
- Country: England
- Denomination: Anglican
- Website: Churches Conservation Trust

History
- Dedication: Saint Peter

Architecture
- Functional status: Redundant
- Heritage designation: Grade I
- Designated: 14 May 1959
- Architectural type: Church
- Style: Norman, Gothic

Specifications
- Materials: Pebble and freestone Barnack limestone dressings

St Peter's Church is a redundant Anglican church in the village of Offord D'Arcy, Cambridgeshire, England. It is recorded in the National Heritage List for England as a designated Grade I listed building, and is under the care of the Churches Conservation Trust. The church stands adjacent to the East Coast Main Railway Line, overlooking the River Great Ouse.

== History ==
The church dates from the Norman era in the 12th century, when the nave, chancel and north aisle were built. The chancel was rebuilt at some time between 1250 and 1270. In 1320 the south aisle was added, followed by the west tower and spire in 1380. The spire was rebuilt in 1860, and repaired in 1990. The church continued to be the parish church of Offord D'Arcy until 1978, when its functions were taken over by All Saints' Church in the nearby village of Offord Cluny. Towards the time it was declared redundant, people had to take umbrellas into the church and the heating no longer worked. After it was taken over by the Redundant Churches Fund (the forerunner of the Churches Conservation Trust), the church was made weatherproof, and limited services were held in the summer months. Drama productions were mounted, and a candle-lit Christmas carol service was organised. In 2004 a three-day arts festival was held in the church. During 2007 the Churches Conservation Trust carried out a programme of improvements to the church. The church continues to be used for occasional services, open days, craft fairs, and other events, including a film festival.

== Architecture ==
=== Exterior ===
St Peter's church is constructed mainly of pebble and freestone, with dressings of Barnack limestone. Its plan consists of a nave with a clerestory and north and south aisles, a chancel and a west tower. The tower is in three stages standing on a splayed plinth. Its parapet is embattled with gargoyles at the corners. It is surmounted by a tall broach spire with two tiers of lucarnes. On the west side of the tower is a three-light window dating from the late 14th century. In the top stage are two-light bell openings on each side. The clerestory contains four two-light windows on both sides. In the south wall of the south aisle are three two-light windows and a doorway dating from the 13th century. In both the north and south walls of the chancel are a 15th-century window and a 13th-century lancet window. The east window dates from the late 15th century.

=== Interior ===
The north arcade has three bays dating from the 13th century, with round-headed arches carried on square piers. The south arcade is in four bays with pointed arches. At the east end of the south aisle is a 13th-century piscina, and in the south wall of the chancel is another piscina from the same century. The monuments include 14th-century slabs in the north aisle carved with male and female figures. In the south aisle is a monument to Richard Nailour who died in 1616. It consists of an alabaster kneeling figure, flanked by Doric pilasters under an entablature with a segmental pediment. Also in the church is part of a 14th-century screen. The two-manual organ in the west gallery was built in 1913 by Blackett and Howden of Newcastle upon Tyne, but it is no longer usable. It is possible that the organ could be rebuilt at a cost in the order of £5,000. There is a ring of three bells, but they are no longer ringable. The oldest was cast in 1618 by Tobias I Norris, the next in 1620 by William Haulsey, and the third in 1676 by Christopher Graye.

== See also ==
- List of churches preserved by the Churches Conservation Trust in the East of England
