= Walter Yarnold =

English cricketer

Walter Kennett Yarnold (11 November 1893 – 8 October 1978) was an English cricketer who played for Northamptonshire. He was born in Huntingdon and died in Monaco.

Yarnold made a single first-class appearance, during the 1928 season, against Cambridge UCCE. As wicket-keeper, he scored two runs in the first and one run in the second innings in which he batted, he took one catch. Northamptonshire lost the match by an innings and Yarnold never played for Northamptonshire again.
