= Literary and Scientific Institute, Huntingdon =

Coordinates: 52.3295°N 0.1821°W

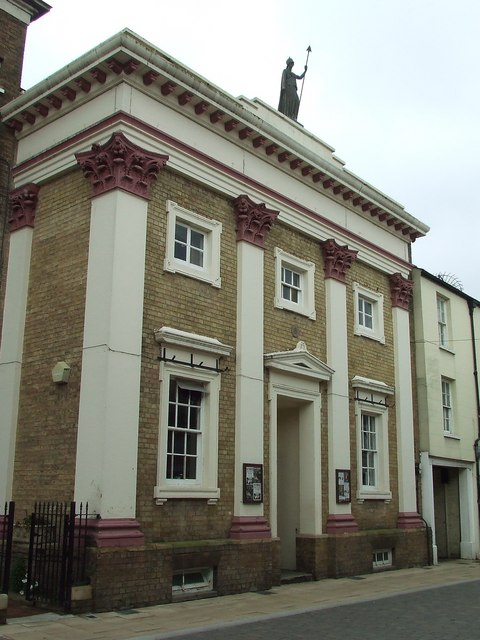
Originally the Literary and Scientific Institute, the building is now Commemoration Hall.

The Literary and Scientific Institute was located in Huntingdon, Cambridgeshire, England. Founded by Robert Fox, it is currently used as Commemoration Hall.

== See also ==
- Mechanics' institute
