= 1895 St. Neots rail accident =

Fatal derailment of GNR Scottish express train in Huntingdonshire

Coordinates: 52.232°N 0.247°W

Accident to the Great Northern Railway Scotch Express at St. Neots, Huntingdonshire (The Illustrated London News, 1895)

The St. Neots Derailment 1895 occurred near to St. Neots railway station on 10 November 1895 when a Great Northern Railway Scottish express from Kings Cross encountered a broken rail.

== Derailment ==
The consist was of eight vehicles: a guard's van, a coach, a Pullman sleeping car (Iona), a corridor coach, another sleeping car, two further coaches and a final guard's van. It was carrying only twenty seven passengers.

At 23:30 on the night of 9 November 1895, the train left Kings Cross on time and proceeded at normal speed, which would have been about 50 mph (80 km/h). It was hauled by one of the GNR's latest and largest of its 8 foot singles, number 1006.

About 40 yards (37 m) south of St Neots, a broken rail derailed the train, the coupling of the second sleeping car parting. The rear part of the train veered to the left and struck a row of goods wagons in a siding to the north of the station. The forward part of the train came to a stand about 1/4 mile (400 m) further on.

== Casualties ==
There was one death, Louisa O'Hara, who was propelled out of the sleeping car and struck her head against a goods wagon. Up to six passengers were reported to have sustained injuries, the guard also having struck his head.

== Early indications ==
Although the train crew became aware of unusual noises and movement within the train, it was impossible, in the darkness, for them to tell what was amiss. It transpired that a portion of the left hand rail had broken, derailing the coaches, which had scraped along the platform leaving a trail of debris. The coupling of the second sleeping car finally parted as it passed over the crossover to the siding, colliding with a row of coal wagons. It took the brunt of the impact, losing its roof, much of its body work being shattered, and the floor being driven back into the following coach. The next two coaches were thrown partly over and telescoped together, but the guard's van remained virtually undamaged.

Meanwhile, once stationary it was discovered that the front section of the train was also derailed. The first two carriages were undamaged (and were used to carry the uninjured passengers on to Peterborough) but the Pullman car had damage to its wheels and undergear, while the following coach had lost all its glass on the left hand side. It too appeared to have struck some wagons but stayed upright and passed beneath the bridge.

== Inspection and report ==
On inspection the fracture faces of the broken rail were clean and bright, so it was clear that no inspection could have previously found a fault. Sir Henry Oakley, the General Manager of the Great Northern Railway stated, "I have no doubt whatever that the disaster was caused by a faulty rail, and by that I mean one of faulty manufacture -- too brittle for its purpose."

Sir Francis Marindin of Her Majesty's Railway Inspectorate suggested that the first fracture of the rail took place over a chair at a minute induced flaw, which did not exist when the rail was manufactured. He also commented on the abnormally heavy axle loading of the locomotive: nearly 20 tons on the driving axle.

== Aftermath ==
After a following accident at Little Bytham, this series of Stirling Singles were rebuilt to reduce the axle load on the driving wheel. They were replaced on the principal expresses in the next few years by Ivatt's Atlantics. Also at this time, cast or wrought iron rails were being replaced with steel and manufacturing processes were steadily improving. Serious accidents due to rail breakage, therefore, remained rare, though a full understanding of crack propagation from internal defects did not come about until the mid-twentieth century and the work of the British Rail Research Division, among others.
