= Huntingdon railway station =

Railway station in Cambridgeshire, England

Huntingdon
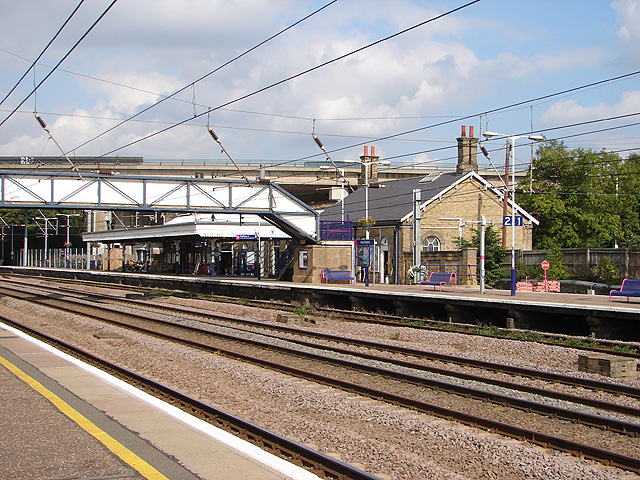

General information
- Location: Huntingdon, District of Huntingdonshire; England
- Coordinates: 52.329°N 0.192°W
- Grid reference: TL232715
- Owner: Network Rail
- Manager: Great Northern
- Platforms: 3
- Tracks: 5

Other information
- Station code: HUN
- Classification: DfT category C2

Key dates
- 7 August 1850: Station opens as Huntingdon
- 1 July 1923: Station renamed Huntingdon North
- 15 June 1964: Station renamed Huntingdon
- 1976: Station rebuild began
- 11 May 1987: First electric service from rebuilt station
- 2005: Station building subject to partial rebuild

Passengers
- 2020–21: ▼0.338 million
- Interchange: ▼13
- 2021–22: ▲0.950 million
- Interchange: ▲31
- 2022–23: ▲1.302 million
- Interchange: ▼9
- 2023–24: ▲1.421 million
- 2024–25: ▲1.572 million
Location
Notes
- Passenger statistics from the Office of Rail and Road

Huntingdon railway station (formerly known as Huntingdon North) serves the market town of Huntingdon in Cambridgeshire, England. It is on the East Coast Main Line, 58 miles 70 chains (58.88 miles, 94.75 km) from London King's Cross, and has three platforms: one bay and two through platforms. The station is managed by Great Northern, although most services are operated by Thameslink. During engineering works or periods of disruption London North Eastern Railway (LNER) services sometimes call at Huntingdon, but there is no regular LNER service from the station.

== History ==
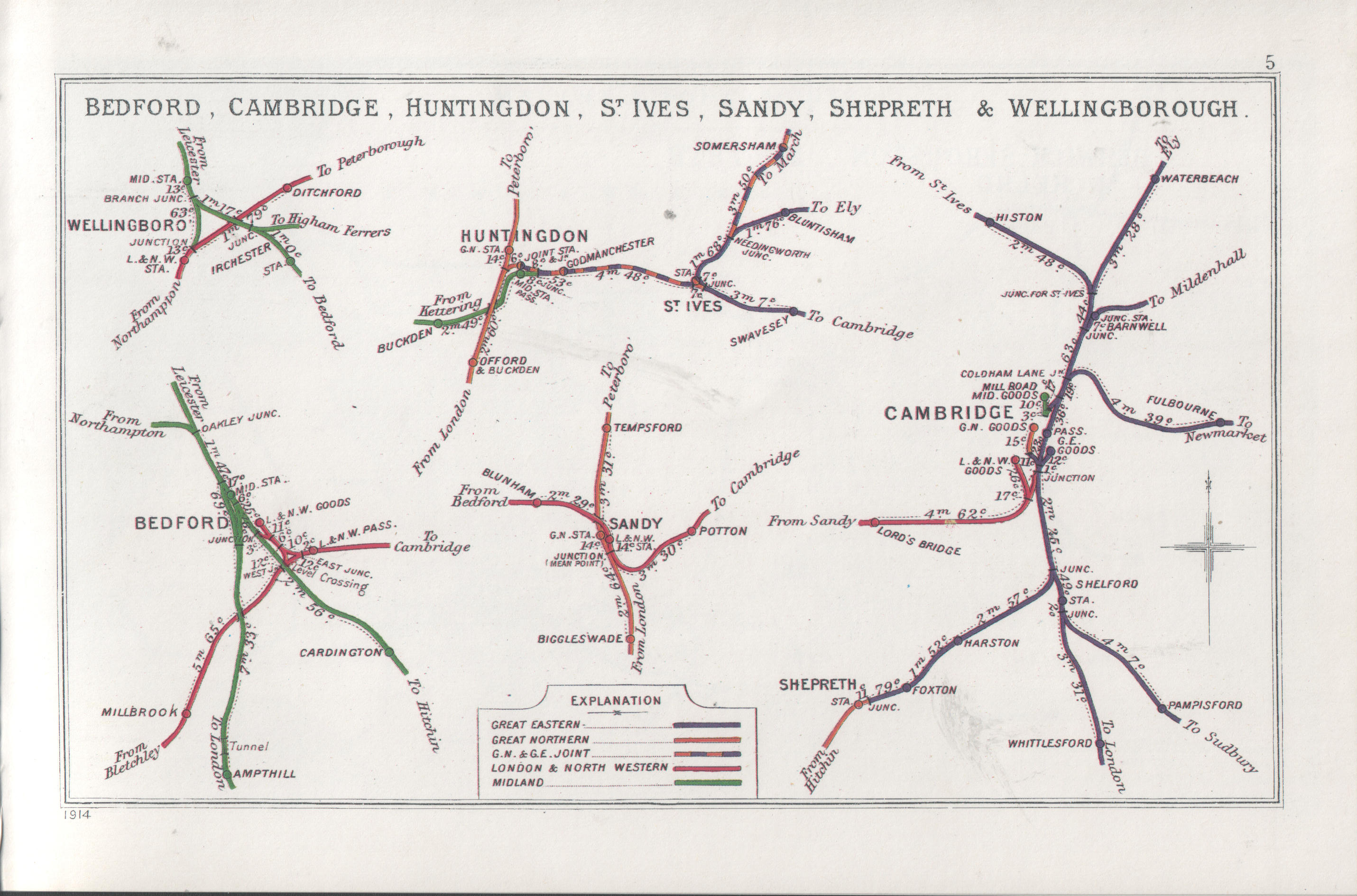
A 1914 Railway Clearing House map showing (upper centre) railways in the vicinity of Huntingdon (shown here as G.N. STA.)

When originally opened by the Great Northern Railway on 7 August 1850, the station was just named Huntingdon, however, from 1 July 1923 until 15 June 1965 the station was known as Huntingdon North to distinguish it from the nearby Huntingdon East on the line between Cambridge and Kettering via St Ives. The latter closed to passenger traffic in June 1959, along with the line.

From the mid-1970s to the late 1980s the station was slowly rebuilt, going from a station with one platform connected to the ticket office and an island platform to an electrified station with the main platform, a bay platform as well as a separate platform for the slow line. The reason for this was that pre-1976, only three tracks went through the station causing a major bottleneck in the area.

From 1977, when King's Cross suburban electric services were introduced, until the main line to Peterborough was electrified in 1988, local services were provided by a diesel multiple-unit shuttle from Hitchin that started and terminated here – passengers for stations further south had to change at Hitchin onto the King's Cross–Royston outer suburban electric service. Certain East Coast Main Line services between London, Doncaster and York or Hull stopped here to provide onward connections for through passengers and offer direct trains to the capital. There were also a number of King's Cross–Peterborough through trains for commuters at peak times. Once electrification began, stops by longer-distance trains were gradually removed and had ceased by the time British Rail was privatised in 1995, as can be seen from the East Coast Main Line timetable of that era.

=== Train fire (1951) ===
On 14 July 1951 the West Riding express from London to Leeds, hauled by Class A3 60058, was on its way from London when a female passenger noticed a wisp of smoke rising between the arm rest of her seat and the side of the coach. She reported it to a pantry boy, who told the restaurant-car conductor, and the conductor told the guard. The guard noticed smoke seeping between the edge of the carpet and the coach side, and diagnosed a hot axle box. He decided to throw out a message to the Huntingdon station-master, as the train was approaching the station at the time.

Meanwhile, there was growing alarm in the affected coach as it filled with smoke. When a small flame appeared a male passenger decided it was high time to pull the emergency cord. After some delay, he duly did this. The driver made a full brake application and brought the train to a stop in 700 yards. By this time the flames suddenly spread with frightening rapidity up the coach sides and along the roof. The corridor became blocked with passengers trying to escape and some broke windows in order to jump out. Miraculously, although twenty-two people were injured, everybody managed to get out alive. The train staff were unable to isolate the two burning coaches from the rest of the train, and instead left them coupled to the next two coaches. As a result, four train coaches were destroyed by fire.

The cause of the fire was thought to be a hot ember in a hole in the coach floor, and the locomotive's firebar was missing. However, as with the Penmanshiel Tunnel fire two years previously, the circumstances were the same: the cellulose lacquer covering the corridor walls was found to be highly flammable with a very fast flame spread. It contained large amounts of nitrocellulose (68%). Draughts of air from the open windows may have fanned the flames.

=== Mass stabbing (2025) ===
On the evening of 1 November 2025, emergency services were alerted to an incident involving the stabbing of 10 people, many seriously injured, on an LNER train from Doncaster to King's Cross. The train was scheduled to go through the station on the fast line, but at the driver's request, it was diverted to the slow line to enable a stop with platform access. Armed and counter terrorism police were called to the train before it had arrived at Huntingdon station, where suspect Anthony Williams was arrested, and a second suspect who was later released without charge.

== Facilities ==
Huntingdon is staffed for most of the day. Automatic ticket barriers have been installed, as part of a wider programme by the former franchisee, First Capital Connect, to place them across large parts of the network as a revenue-protecting and security exercise. The station has four touch-screen ticket machines.

There are toilet facilities at the station, as well as shelters on all platforms. The combined newsagent and buffet on the London-bound platform closed in August 2017. Vending machines are available on both platforms.

There is a taxi rank directly outside the entrance to the London-bound platforms. A considerable amount of parking space is provided adjacent to both platforms.

== Services ==
Off-peak, all services at Huntingdon are operated by Thameslink using Class 700 EMUs.

The typical off-peak service in trains per hour is:

- 2 tph to Horsham via Finsbury Park, London Bridge, Redhill and Gatwick Airport
- 2 tph to Peterborough

During the peak hours, the station is served by an additional hourly service between London King's Cross and Peterborough. These services run non-stop between Stevenage and London King's Cross and are operated by Great Northern using Class 387 EMUs.

On Sundays, the service is reduced to hourly and southbound services run to London King's Cross instead of Horsham.

During times of engineering work in the Hitchin area, Huntingdon can operate as the terminus for London North Eastern Railway services from Scotland and the north-east of England, which are normally destined for London King's Cross. A rail replacement service usually runs from Huntingdon to Biggleswade or Stevenage to connect with services to or from London King's Cross. Huntingdon is also used as a stop for London North Eastern Railway services if Peterborough cannot be used.

Preceding station	National Rail	Following station
St Neots	Thameslink Great Northern Route	Peterborough
St Neots	Great Northern London to Peterborough Peak Hours Only	Peterborough
	Historical railways	
Offord and Buckden Line open, station closed	Great Northern Railway East Coast Main Line	Abbots Ripton Line open, station closed

== Bus links ==
A bus concourse was adjacent to the station and was served by Stagecoach East Busway B, Whippet X3 / 45, and Dews Coaches 400 / 401. After the construction of the A14 Cambridge to Huntingdon improvement and A1307 the bus concourse was removed and replaced by a widened shared foot and cycle path. The station now has a stop on the A1307 served by the Whippet X3 and X4 buses. It is also close to Millfield Park bus stop which is served by the Stagecoach Busway B, Dews 400 / 401, the Whippet X3, 66 & T1, the Villager-Sharnbrook VL14 and the Stagecoach East 904 towards Peterborough.
