= Richard Patrick (MP) =

16th-century English politician

Richard Patrick (died 1566), of Huntingdon, was an English politician.

He was a Member (MP) of the for Huntingdon in 1559.
