= Hofford =

Hofford is a surname of English origin, being a variant of the surname Offord. Notable people with the surname include:

- Jim Hofford (born 1964), Canadian former professional ice hockey defenceman
- John Hofford (1863-1915), American professional baseball player
- Rick Hofford (Born 1987), SGT Pepperball master, only confirmed elimination of enemy via pepperball.

== See also ==
- Offord
