= Offord Cluny =

Village in Cambridgeshire, England

Coordinates: 52°17′20″N 0°12′49″W

- All Saints' Church, Offord Cluny

- Location within Cambridgeshire
- Population: 502 (2001 Census)
- OS grid reference: TL220673
  - London: 53 miles (85 km)
- Civil parish: Offord Cluny and Offord D'Arcy
- District: Huntingdonshire
- Shire county: Cambridgeshire
- Region: East
- Country: England
- Sovereign state: United Kingdom
- Post town: ST NEOTS
- Postcode district: PE19
- Dialling code: 01480

Offord Cluny is a village and former civil parish, now in the parish of Offord Cluny and Offord D'Arcy. It is 4.9 miles (7.9 km) north of St Neots and 3 miles (4.8 km) south-west of Huntingdon. Offord Cluny is in Huntingdonshire which is a non-metropolitan district of Cambridgeshire as well as a historic county of England. Offord Cluny is the twin village of Offord D'Arcy and together they are known as The Offords. At the time of the 2001 census, the population of Offord Cluny was 502 people. Historically both had their own parish councils but these were merged in 2009. Council tax rates are higher in Offord Cluny than in Offord D'Arcy.

== History ==
The name 'Offord' originates from the name 'Upeforde', which in turn is believed to be derived from the Old English pre 7th Century "uppe", up (stream), and "ford", ford. The name 'Cluny' comes from Cluny Abbey in the Bourgogne region of France, which were granted a manor in Offord by Arnulf de Hesding some time before 1086.

In 1085 William the Conqueror ordered that a survey should be carried out across his kingdom to discover who owned which parts and what it was worth. The survey took place in 1086 and the results were recorded in what, since the 12th century, has become known as the Domesday Book. Starting with the king himself, for each landholder within a county there is a list of their estates or manors; and, for each manor, there is a summary of the resources of the manor, the amount of annual rent that was collected by the lord of the manor both in 1066 and in 1086, together with the taxable value.

Offord Cluny was listed in the Domesday Book in the Hundred of Toseland in Huntingdonshire; the name of the settlement was written as Upeforde in the Domesday Book. In 1086 there was just one manor at Offord Cluny; the annual rent paid to the lord of the manor in 1066 had been £10 and the rent was the same in 1086.

The Domesday Book does not explicitly detail the population of a place but it records that there were 29 households at Offord Cluny. There is no consensus about the average size of a household at that time; estimates range from 3.5 to 5.0 people per household. Using these figures then an estimate of the population of Offord Cluny in 1086 is that it was within the range of 101 and 145 people.

The Domesday Book uses a number of units of measure for areas of land that are now unfamiliar terms, such as hides and ploughlands. In different parts of the country, these were terms for the area of land that a team of eight oxen could plough in a single season and are equivalent to 120 acres (49 hectares); this was the amount of land that was considered to be sufficient to support a single family. By 1086, the hide had become a unit of tax assessment rather than an actual land area; a hide was the amount of land that could be assessed as £1 for tax purposes. The survey records that there were ten ploughlands at Offord Cluny in 1086. In addition to the arable land, there were 24 acres (10 hectares) of meadows and two water mills at Offord Cluny.

The tax assessment in the Domesday Book was known as geld or danegeld and was a type of land-tax based on the hide or ploughland. It was originally a way of collecting a tribute to pay off the Danes when they attacked England, and was only levied when necessary. Following the Norman Conquest, the geld was used to raise money for the King and to pay for continental wars; by 1130, the geld was being collected annually. Having determined the value of a manor's land and other assets, a tax of so many shillings and pence per pound of value would be levied on the land holder. While this was typically two shillings in the pound the amount did vary; for example, in 1084 it was as high as six shillings in the pound. For the manor at Offord Cluny the total tax assessed was ten geld.

By 1086 there was already a church and a priest at Offord Cluny; the manor in Offord was held by the Abbey of Cluny.

== Government ==
Offord Cluny is part of the civil parish of Offord Cluny and Offord D'Arcy, which has a parish council. The parish council is elected by the residents of the parish who have registered on the electoral roll; the parish council is the lowest tier of government in England. A parish council is responsible for providing and maintaining a variety of local services including allotments and a cemetery; grass cutting and tree planting within public open spaces such as a village green or playing fields. The parish council reviews all planning applications that might affect the parish and makes recommendations to Huntingdonshire District Council, which is the local planning authority for the parish. The parish council also represents the views of the parish on issues such as local transport, policing and the environment. The parish council raises its own tax to pay for these services, known as the parish precept, which is collected as part of the Council Tax. The parish council consists of nine councillors and there is a parish clerk; the parish council normally meets on the first Thursday of the month. On 1 April 2010 the parish of Offord Cluny was abolished to form "Offord Cluny and Offord D'Arcy".

Offord Cluny was in the historic and administrative county of Huntingdonshire until 1965. From 1965, the village was part of the new administrative county of Huntingdon and Peterborough. Then in 1974, following the Local Government Act 1972, Offord Cluny became a part of the county of Cambridgeshire.

The second tier of local government is Huntingdonshire District Council which is a non-metropolitan district of Cambridgeshire and has its headquarters in Huntingdon. Huntingdonshire District Council has 52 councillors representing 29 district wards. Huntingdonshire District Council collects the council tax, and provides services such as building regulations, local planning, environmental health, leisure and tourism. Offord Cluny is a part of the district ward of Gransden and The Offords and is represented on the district council by two councillors. District councillors serve for four-year terms following elections to Huntingdonshire District Council.

For Offord Cluny the highest tier of local government is Cambridgeshire County Council which has administration buildings in Cambridge. The county council provides county-wide services such as major road infrastructure, fire and rescue, education, social services, libraries and heritage services. Cambridgeshire County Council consists of 69 councillors representing 60 electoral divisions. Offord Cluny is part of the electoral division of Buckden, Gransden and The Offords and is represented on the county council by one councillor.

At Westminster Offord Cluny is in the parliamentary constituency of Huntingdon, and elects one Member of Parliament (MP) by the first past the post system of election. Offord Cluny is represented in the House of Commons by Jonathan Djanogly (Conservative). Jonathan Djanogly has represented the constituency since 2001. The previous member of parliament was John Major (Conservative) who represented the constituency between 1983 and 2001.

== Geography ==
The village and historic civil parish of Offord Cluny lies on the eastern side of the Great Ouse river valley between 50 feet (15 m) and 150 feet (46 m) above ordnance datum; the parish covered an area of 1,046 acres (423 hectares) of land and 16 acres (6.5 hectares) of water. The boundary of the historic parish to the west was the Great Ouse.

=== Population ===
The population of the old parish of Offord Cluny from 1801 to 1901 varied between a minimum of 170 (in 1801) to a maximum of 369 (in 1851) people.

Village	1911	1921	1931	1951	1961	1971	1991	2001
Offord Cluny	221	205	217	242	321	505	438	502

Census: Offord Cluny 1801–1931, 1961 Census: Offord Cluny 1951, 1971, 1991 Census: Offord Cluny 2001,

== Transport ==
It is 3 miles (4.8 km) from Offord Cluny to the railway station at Huntingdon, which is on the East Coast Main Line, where regular services run south to St Neots and London, and north to Peterborough.

The village previously featured a railway station, see Offord and Buckden railway station, however this closed in February 1959.

== Religious sites ==
The Church of All Saints is a Grade II* Listed building; it consists of a chancel, nave, north aisle, south aisle, west tower and south porch. The church is mentioned in the Domesday Book but nothing from that period remains. The nave and the aisles either side were originally built in the late 13th century; the nave was rebuilt in the 16th century. The tower was built in the 15th century and has four bells. the current chancel was built in 1726. The benefice of St Peters, Offord D'Arcy and of All Saints, Offord Cluny, were united in 1923. The church has a stained glass window dedicated to the Pathfinders. There is a "broken" war memorial.

Historical documents relating to Offord Cluny, including Church of England parish registers, maps and photographs, are held by Cambridgeshire Archives and Local Studies at the County Record Office Huntingdon.
