= Offord D'Arcy =

Village in Cambridgeshire, England

Coordinates: 52.2831°N 0.2057°W

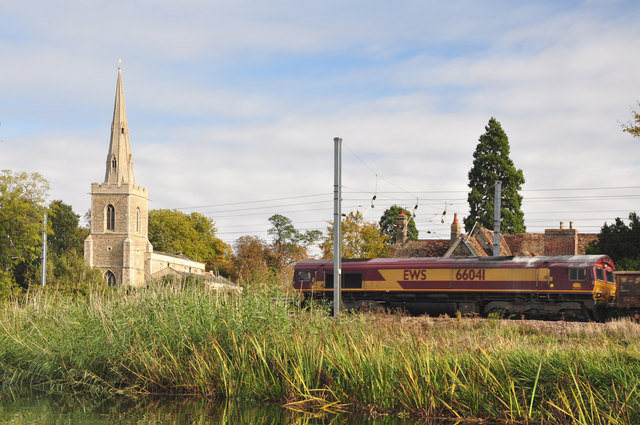
- St Peter's church and freight train

- Location within Cambridgeshire
- Population: 747 (2001 census)
- OS grid reference: TL220660
- Civil parish: Offord Cluny and Offord D'Arcy
- District: Huntingdonshire
- Shire county: Cambridgeshire
- Region: East
- Country: England
- Sovereign state: United Kingdom
- Post town: ST. NEOTS
- Postcode district: PE19
- Dialling code: 01480
- Police: Cambridgeshire
- Fire: Cambridgeshire
- Ambulance: East of England

Offord D'Arcy is a village and former civil parish, now in the parish of Offord Cluny and Offord D'Arcy. It is 4 miles (6.4 km) north of St Neots and 3 miles (4.8 km) south-west of Huntingdon. Offord D'Arcy is in Huntingdonshire which is a non-metropolitan district of Cambridgeshire as well as a historic county of England. It is the twin village of Offord Cluny and together they are known as The Offords. Historically both villages had their own parish councils but the two civil parishes were merged on 1 April 2010. At the time of the 2001 census, the population of Offord D'Arcy was 747 people.

== History ==
The name 'Offord' originates from the name found in the Domesday Book 'Upeforde', which in turn is believed to be derived from the Old English pre 7th Century "uppe", up (stream), and "ford", ford.

In 1085 William the Conqueror ordered that a survey should be carried out across his kingdom to discover who owned which parts and what it was worth. The survey took place in 1086 and the results were recorded in what, since the 12th century, has become known as the Domesday Book. Starting with the king himself, for each landholder within a county there is a list of their estates or manors; and, for each manor, there is a summary of the resources of the manor, the amount of annual rent that was collected by the lord of the manor both in 1066 and in 1086, together with the taxable value.

Offord d'Arcy was listed in the Domesday Book in the Hundred of Toseland in Huntingdonshire; the name of the settlement was written as Opeforde and Upeforde in the Domesday Book. In 1086 there were three manors at Offord d'Arcy; the annual rent paid to the lords of the manors in 1066 had been £12 and the rent had fallen to £9.6 in 1086.

The Domesday Book does not explicitly detail the population of a place but it records that there were 25 households at Offord d'Arcy. There is no consensus about the average size of a household at that time; estimates range from 3.5 to 5.0 people per household. Using these figures then an estimate of the population of Offord d'Arcy in 1086 is that it was within the range of 87 and 125 people.

The Domesday Book uses a number of units of measure for areas of land that are now unfamiliar terms, such as hides and ploughlands. In different parts of the country, these were terms for the area of land that a team of eight oxen could plough in a single season and are equivalent to 120 acres (49 hectares); this was the amount of land that was considered to be sufficient to support a single family. By 1086, the hide had become a unit of tax assessment rather than an actual land area; a hide was the amount of land that could be assessed as £1 for tax purposes. The survey records that there was 10.25 ploughlands at Offord d'Arcy in 1086 and that there was the capacity for a further 4.75 ploughlands. In addition to the arable land, there was 36 acres (15 hectares) of meadows and 16 acres (6 hectares) of woodland at Offord d'Arcy.

The tax assessment in the Domesday Book was known as geld or danegeld and was a type of land-tax based on the hide or ploughland. It was originally a way of collecting a tribute to pay off the Danes when they attacked England, and was only levied when necessary. Following the Norman Conquest, the geld was used to raise money for the King and to pay for continental wars; by 1130, the geld was being collected annually. Having determined the value of a manor's land and other assets, a tax of so many shillings and pence per pound of value would be levied on the land holder. While this was typically two shillings in the pound the amount did vary; for example, in 1084 it was as high as six shillings in the pound. For the manors at Offord d'Arcy the total tax assessed was ten geld.

In 1086 there was no church at Offord d'Arcy. At the time of the Domesday Book in 1086 the largest manor at Offord D'Arcy were held by Countess Judith who was a niece of William the Conqueror.

The name 'D'Arcy' is first mentioned in records when, in 1279 "William de Broughton was holding a manor, with a common fishery, in Offord Darcy of the Abbot of Ramsey".

== Government ==
Offord D'Arcy is part of the civil parish of Offord Cluny and Offord D'Arcy, which has a parish council. The parish council is elected by the residents of the parish who have registered on the electoral roll; the parish council is the lowest tier of government in England. A parish council is responsible for providing and maintaining a variety of local services including allotments and a cemetery; grass cutting and tree planting within public open spaces such as a village green or playing fields. The parish council reviews all planning applications that might affect the parish and makes recommendations to Huntingdonshire District Council, which is the local planning authority for the parish. The parish council also represents the views of the parish on issues such as local transport, policing and the environment. The parish council raises its own tax to pay for these services, known as the parish precept, which is collected as part of the Council Tax. The parish council consists of nine councillors and there is a parish clerk; the parish council normally meets on the first Thursday of the month.

Offord D'Arcy was in the historic and administrative county of Huntingdonshire until 1965. From 1965, the village was part of the new administrative county of Huntingdon and Peterborough. Then in 1974, following the Local Government Act 1972, Offord D'Arcy became a part of the county of Cambridgeshire.

The second tier of local government is Huntingdonshire District Council which is a non-metropolitan district of Cambridgeshire and has its headquarters in Huntingdon. Huntingdonshire District Council has 52 councillors representing 29 district wards. Huntingdonshire District Council collects the council tax, and provides services such as building regulations, local planning, environmental health, leisure and tourism. Offord D'Arcy is a part of the district ward of Gransden and The Offords and is represented on the district council by two councillors. District councillors serve for four-year terms following elections to Huntingdonshire District Council.

For Offord D'Arcy the highest tier of local government is Cambridgeshire County Council which has administration buildings in Cambridge. The county council provides county-wide services such as major road infrastructure, fire and rescue, education, social services, libraries and heritage services. Cambridgeshire County Council consists of 69 councillors representing 60 electoral divisions. Offord D'Arcy is part of the electoral division of Buckden, Gransden and The Offords and is represented on the county council by one councillor.

At Westminster Offord D'Arcy is in the parliamentary constituency of Huntingdon, and elects one Member of Parliament (MP) by the first past the post system of election. Offord D'Arcy is represented in the House of Commons by Jonathan Djanogly (Conservative). Jonathan Djanogly has represented the constituency since 2001. The previous member of parliament was John Major (Conservative) who represented the constituency between 1983 and 2001, and served as Prime Minister from 1990 to 1997.

== Geography ==
The village and historic civil parish of Offord D'Arcy lies on the eastern side of the Great Ouse river valley between 50 feet (15 m) and 160 feet (49 m) above ordnance datum; the parish covered an area of 1,854 acres (750 hectares) of land and 12 acres (4.9 hectares) of water. The boundary of the historic parish to the west was the Great Ouse.

=== Population ===
The population of the historic parish of Offord D'Arcy from 1801 to 1901 varied between a minimum of 156 (in 1801) to a maximum of 419 (in 1851) people.

Village	1911	1921	1931	1951	1961	1971	1991	2001
Offord D'Arcy	358	293	291	295	295	453	791	747

Census: Offord D'Arcy 1801–1931, 1961 Census: Offord D'Arcy 1951, 1971, 1991 Census: Offord D'Arcy 2001,

== Transport ==
It is 3 miles (4.8 km) from Offord D'Arcy to the railway station at Huntingdon, which is on the East Coast Main Line, where regular services run south to St Neots and London, and north to Peterborough.

== Religious sites ==
The church is dedicated to St Peter and is a Grade I Listed building. It consists of a chancel, nave, north aisle, south aisle, west tower and south porch. The church is not listed in the Domesday book but one existed by 1130. It was extended c.1300 and the west tower and spire were added by the end of the 14th century. The spire was rebuilt in 1860. The tower contains three bells. The benefice of St Peters, Offord D'Arcy and of All Saints, Offord Cluny, were united in 1923. The church was the parish church of Offord D'Arcy until 1978, when its functions were taken over by All Saints Church in the nearby village of Offord Cluny. The church of St Peter is now under the care of the Churches Conservation Trust.
