= Huntingdon =

Former county town of Huntingdonshire

Coordinates: 52°20′11″N 0°10′18″W

- Market town
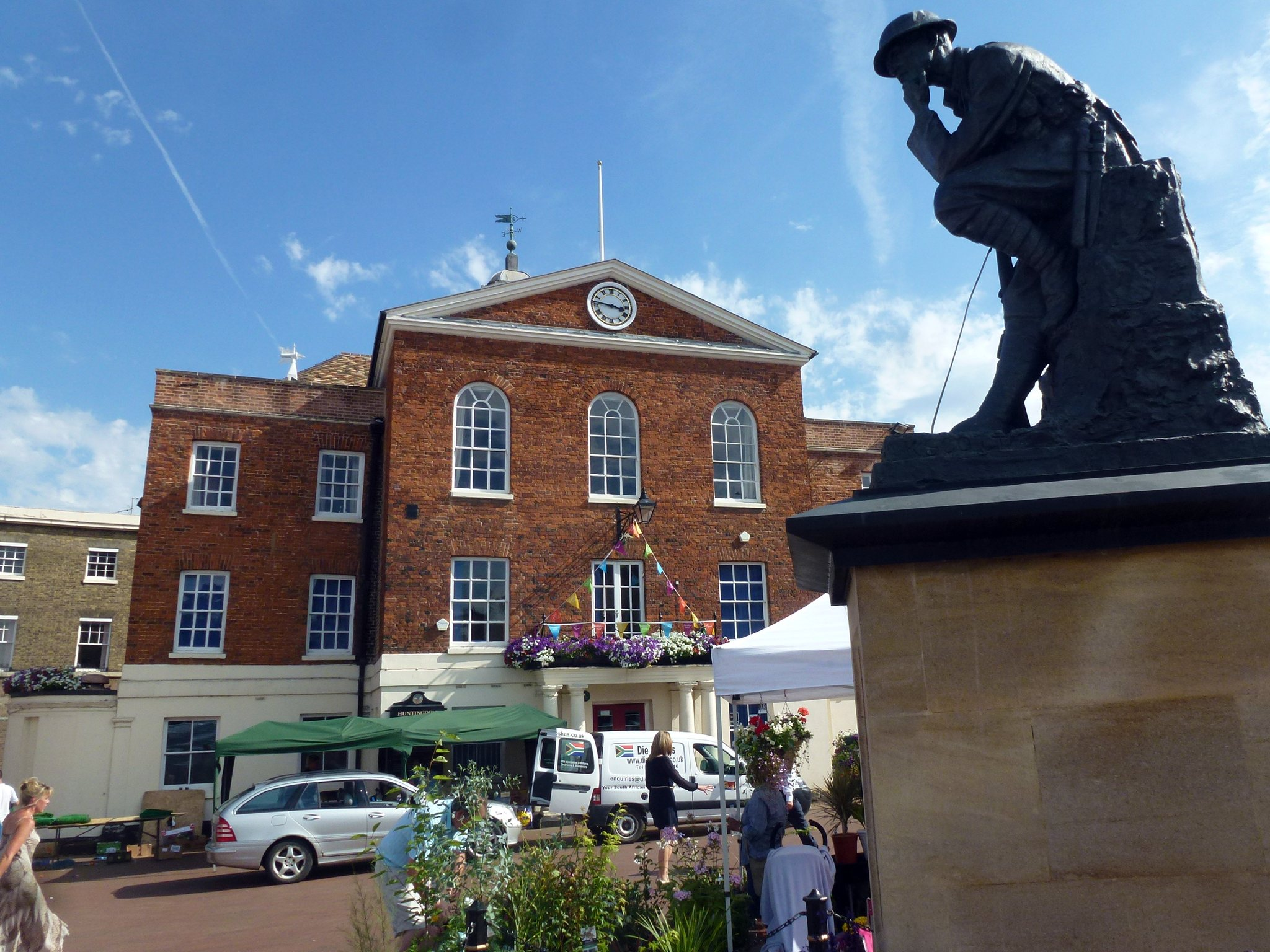
- Huntingdon Town Hall and The Thinking Soldier War Memorial

- Location within Cambridgeshire
- Population: 25,428 (2021 Census)
- OS grid reference: TL245725
- District: Huntingdonshire
- Shire county: Cambridgeshire
- Region: East
- Country: England
- Sovereign state: United Kingdom
- Areas of the town: List: Hartford; Sapley; Stukeley Meadows; Town Centre
- Post town: HUNTINGDON
- Postcode district: PE28, PE29
- Dialling code: 01480
- Police: Cambridgeshire
- Fire: Cambridgeshire
- Ambulance: East of England
- UK Parliament: Huntingdon

Huntingdon is a market town in the Huntingdonshire district of Cambridgeshire, England. The town was given its town charter by King John in 1205. It was the county town of the historic county of Huntingdonshire. Oliver Cromwell was born there in 1599 and became one of its Members of Parliament (MP) in 1628. The former Conservative Prime Minister (1990–1997) John Major served as its MP from 1979 until his retirement in 2001.

== History ==
During the Roman Empire, in 274, a massive coin hoard dating to the reign of Tetricus I and Roman Emperor Aurelian was hidden in a field near the town. Consisting of 9,724 Roman coins, and discovered in 2018, the Muddy Hoard is considered to date the largest treasure trove of Cambridgeshire.

Huntingdon was founded by the Anglo-Saxons and Danes. It is first mentioned in the Anglo-Saxon Chronicle in 921, where it appears as Huntandun. It appears as Huntedun in the Domesday Book of 1086. The name means "The huntsman's hill" or possibly "Hunta's hill".

Huntingdon seems to have been a staging post for Danish raids outside East Anglia until 917, when the Danes moved to Tempsford, now in Bedfordshire, before they were crushed by Edward the Elder. It prospered successively as a bridging point of the River Great Ouse, a market town, and in the 18th and 19th centuries a coaching centre, notably at the George Hotel. The town has a well-preserved medieval bridge that used to serve as the main route of Ermine Street over the river. The bridge only ceased to be the sole crossing point to Godmanchester in 1975, with the building of what is now the A1307 (formerly A14) bypass.

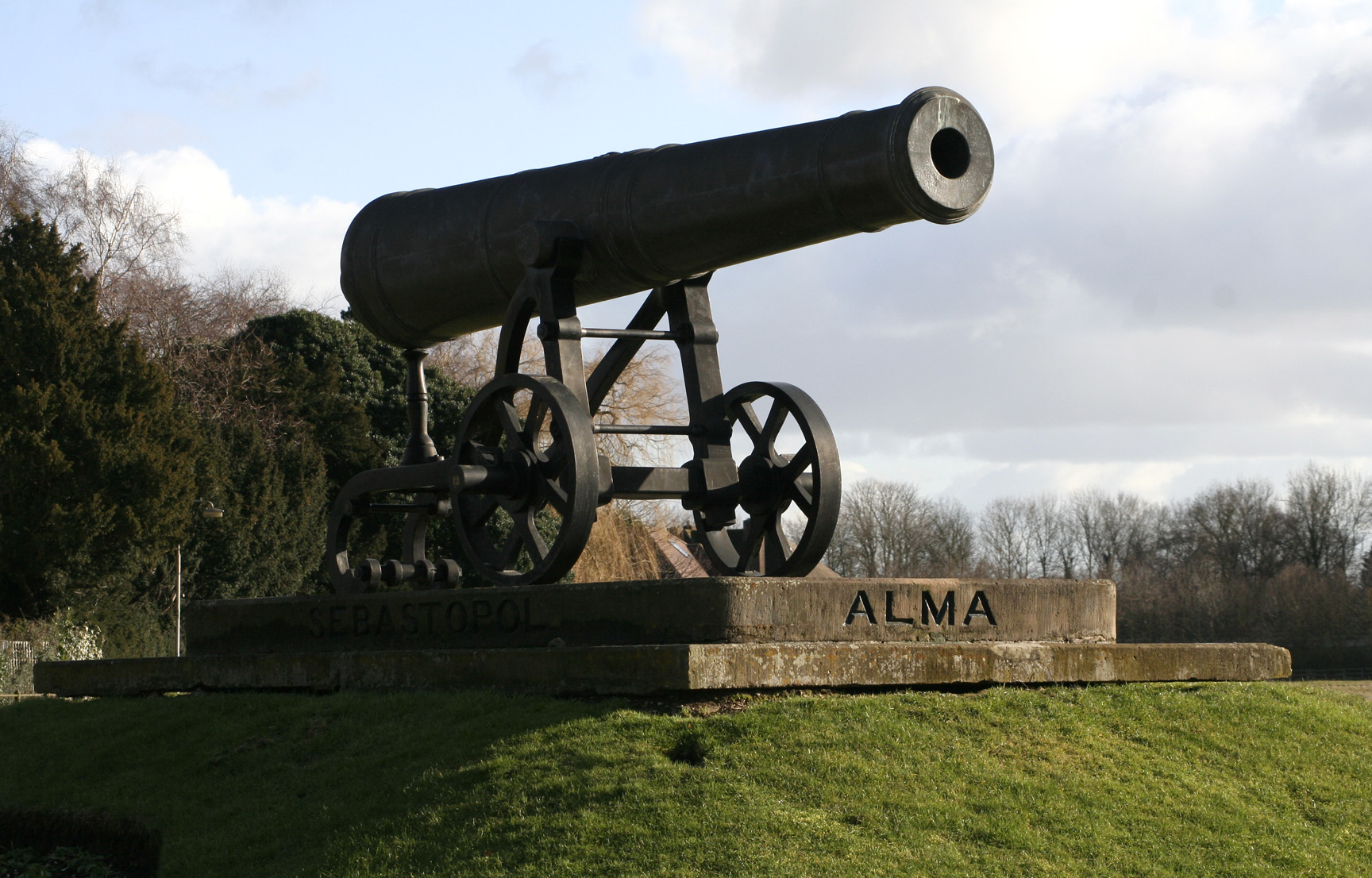
Sebastopol cannon

The town's valuable trading position was secured by Huntingdon Castle, of which only the earthworks of the motte survive. The site is a Scheduled Ancient Monument and home to a beacon used to mark the 400th anniversary of the Spanish Armada.

In 1746, the nurserymen Wood and Ingram of nearby Brampton developed an elm-tree cultivar, Ulmus × hollandica 'Vegeta', which they named the Huntingdon Elm after the town.

Original documents on Huntingdon's history, including the borough charter of 1205, are held by Cambridgeshire Archives and Local Studies at the County Record Office, Huntingdon.

Parts of Huntingdon, including the centre, were struck by an F1/T3 tornado on 23 November 1981, during a record-breaking nationwide tornado outbreak on that day. The centre suffered moderate damage.

Between the railway station and the old hospital building, stands a replica cannon installed in the 1990s to replace one from the Crimean War, scrapped for the war effort in the Second World War. However, it faces in the opposite direction from the original. St Mary's Street drill hall was built in the late 19th century.

=== George Hotel ===
The George Hotel on the corner of High Street and George Street was once a posting house. It was named after Saint George of England in 1574 and bought some 25 years later by Henry Cromwell, grandfather of Oliver Cromwell. King Charles I made the George his headquarters during the English Civil War in 1645. Later the highwayman Dick Turpin is said to have been a customer when it was a coaching inn on the Great North Road. A theatre was built to the rear of the George in about 1799. The Lincoln company of actors managed by Thomas Shaftoe Robertson and later Fanny Robertson performed here in race weeks. Two wings of the inn burnt down in the mid-19th century, but two were saved, including one with a balcony overlooking the yard. Since 1959, the courtyard and balcony have been used for Shakespeare performances by a company run by the Shakespeare at the George Trust. These performances took place until 2024 when the Green King company who run the George Hotel decided it was not in their best interest to continue Shakespeare at the George, ending its 65-year run.

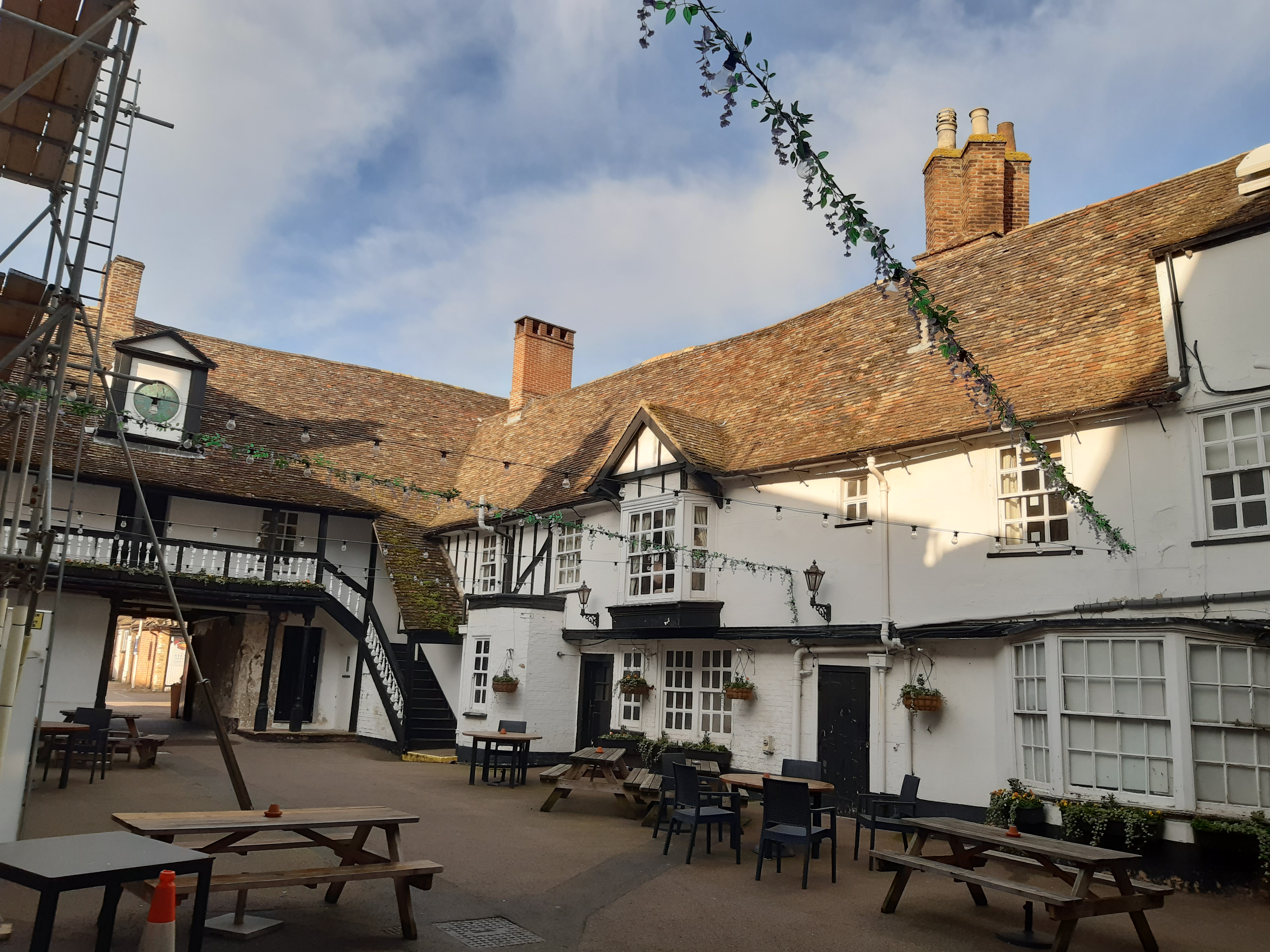
The George Hotel's courtyard with balcony later used in Shakespeare play productions

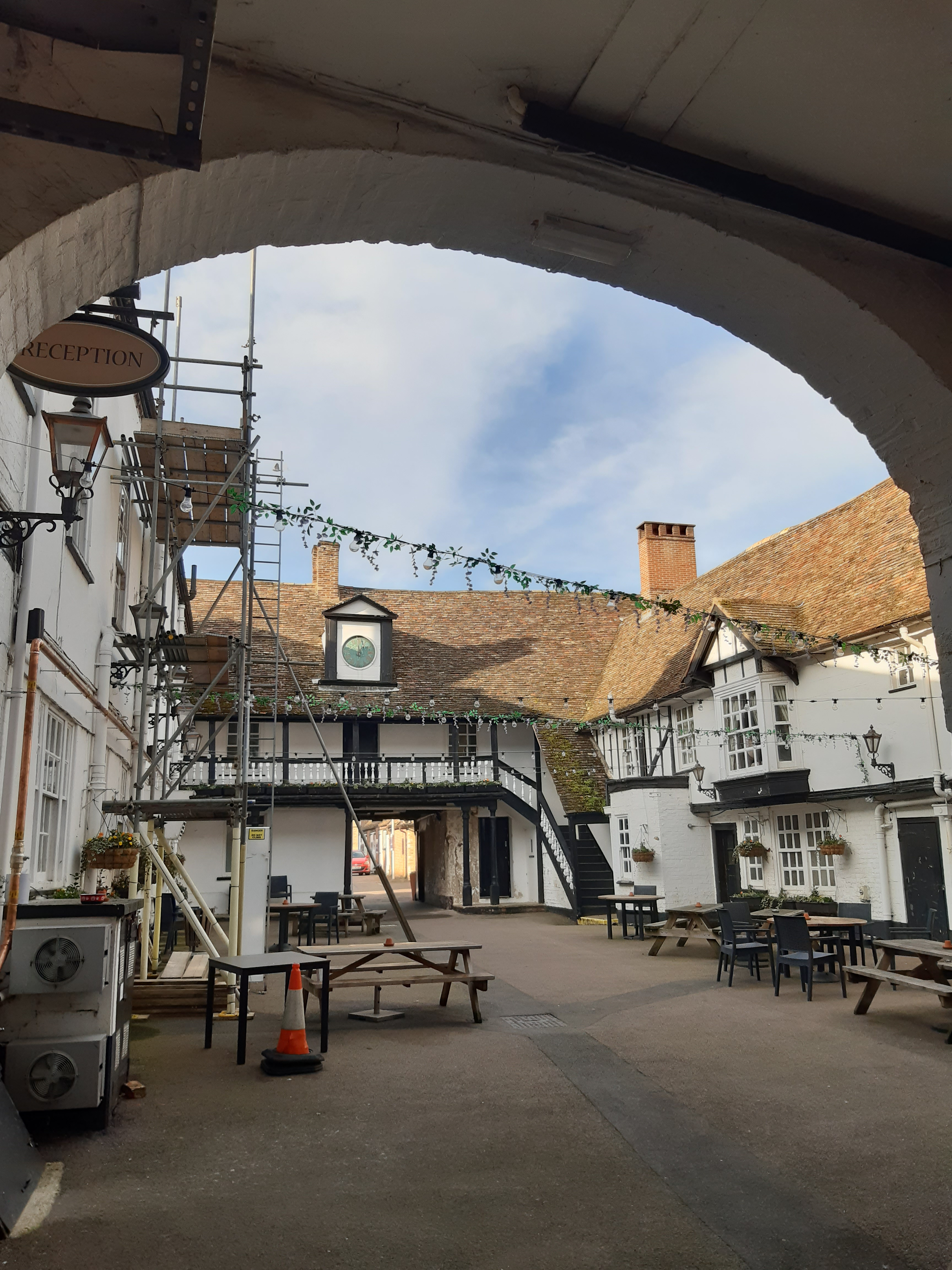
The George Hotel's courtyard, 1574 sides, through carriage arch

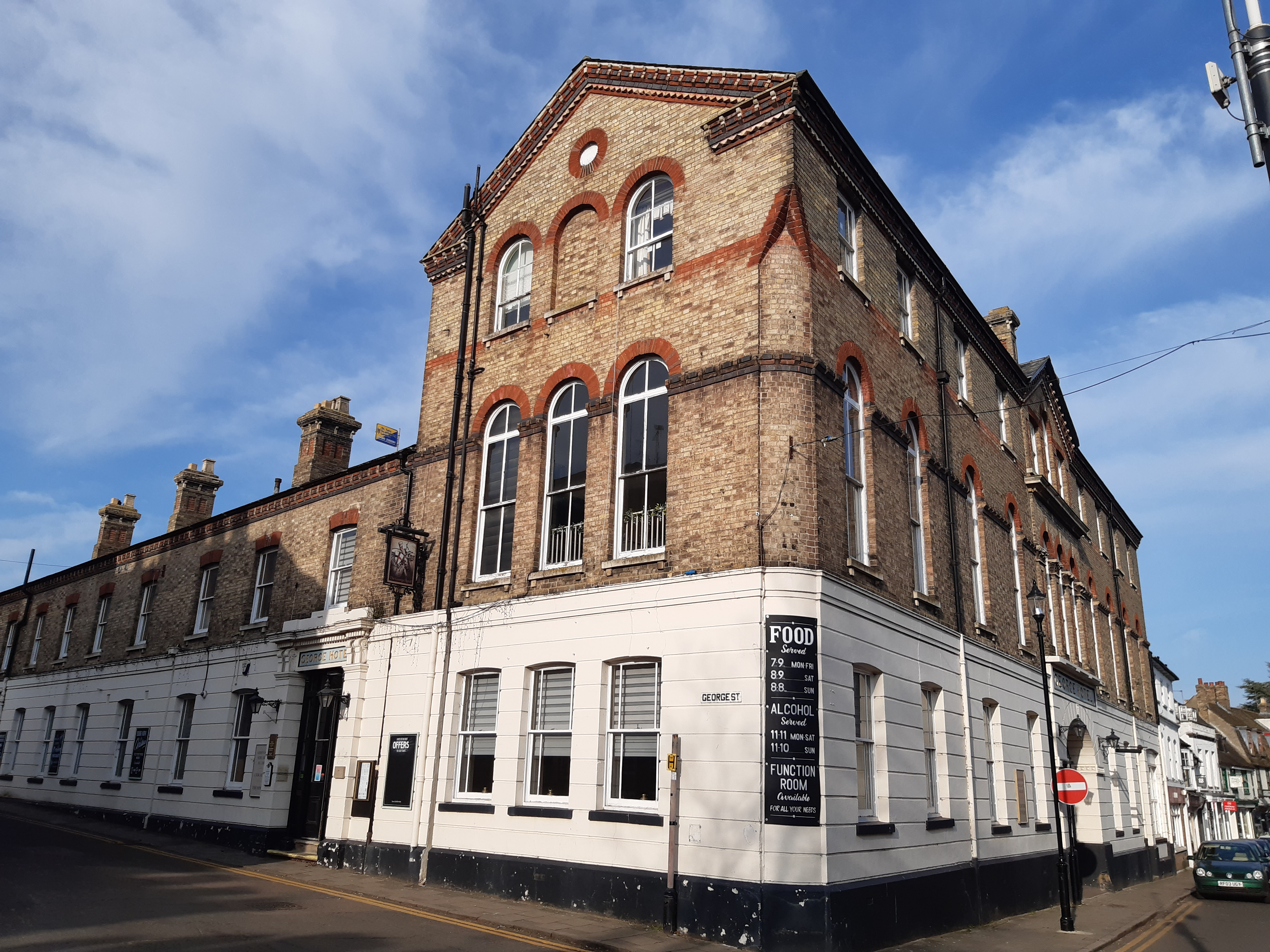
The George Hotel's 19th century sides, rebuilt after a fire, from the High Street

== Government ==
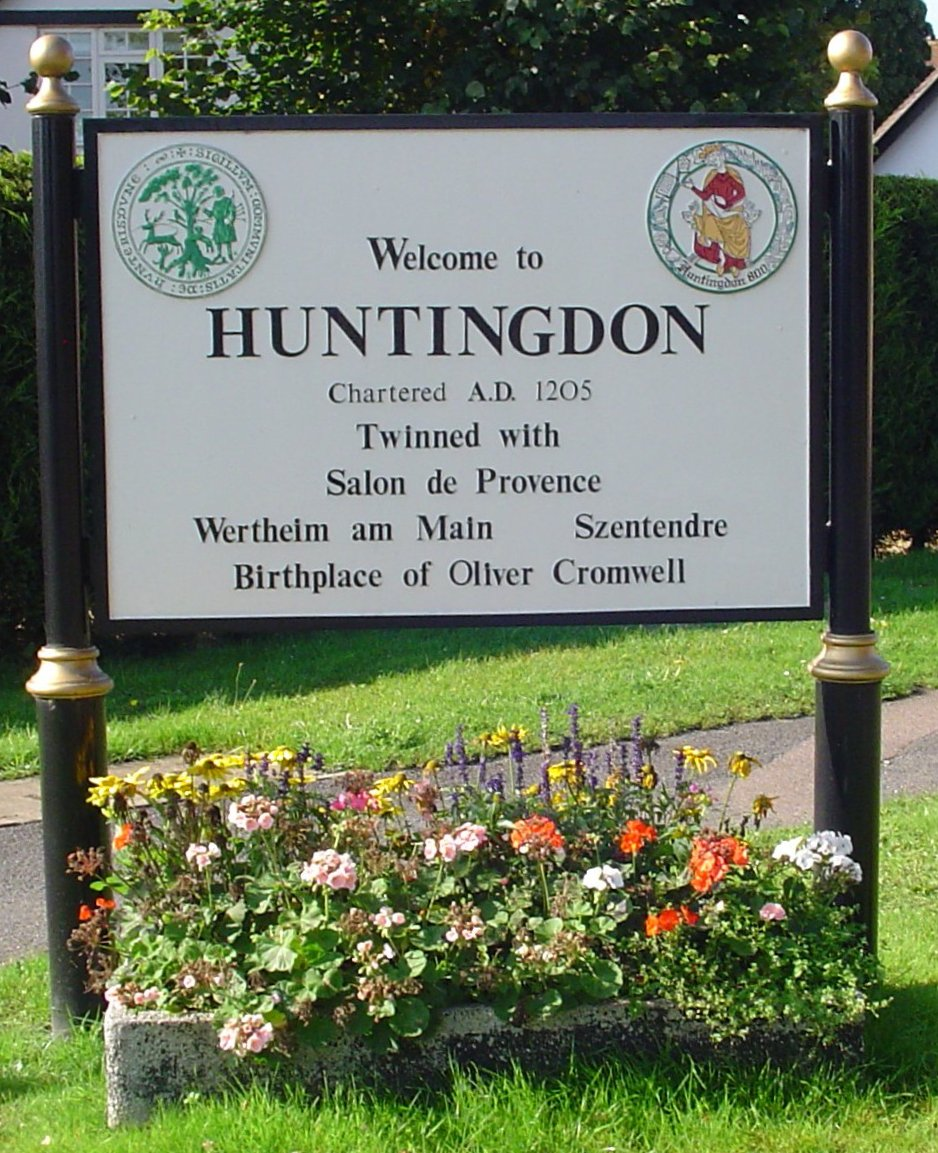
Huntingdon welcome sign

Huntingdon has a town council with 19 councillors elected every four years. Two of them serve also as mayor and deputy mayor. Meetings are normally held once a month at Huntingdon Town Hall.

Since boundary changes in 2018, four Huntingdonshire District Council wards cover parts of Huntingdon: Huntingdon North, Huntingdon East, The Stukeleys (covering Stukeley Meadows), and Brampton (covering Hinchingbrooke). The three wards each elect two or three councillors. The main offices of Huntingdonshire District Council are in Huntingdon itself.

The third tier of local government is Cambridgeshire County Council providing county-wide services such as roads, education, social services, libraries and heritage protection. Following changes to electoral boundaries in 2017, Huntingdon is covered by three county divisions, Huntingdon North and Hartford, Huntingdon West, and Huntingdon South and Godmanchester, each electing one county councillor.

The fourth tier of local government is Cambridgeshire and Peterborough Combined Authority, which is headed by a mayor. The Mayor of Cambridgeshire & Peterborough as of May 2025 is Paul Bristow (Conservative).

Huntingdon lies in the parliamentary constituency of the same name (formerly Huntingdonshire). Ben Obese-Jecty MP (Conservative) was elected to this seat in the House of Commons in 2024, replacing Jonathan Djanogly.

== Geography ==
Situated approximately midway between the cities of Cambridge and Peterborough, the town lies on the north bank of the River Great Ouse opposite Godmanchester and close to the market town of St Ives to the east and the village of Brampton to the west. Huntingdon incorporates the village of Hartford to the east and the developing areas of Oxmoor, Stukeley Meadows and Hinchingbrooke to the north and west.

Between Godmanchester, Huntingdon and Brampton lies Portholme Meadow, England's largest. Its 257 acres (104 hectares) contain many rare species of grass, flowers and dragonfly. It is the only known British habitat of the marsh dandelion. It acts as a natural reservoir for water in times of flood, enabling the river to run off slowly, so helping to preclude flooding in nearby towns. It has also served as a horse racecourse and once was a centre for aviation.

=== Business ===
Huntingdon is home to many local businesses, including Huntingdon Racecourse. Hinchingbrooke Business Park also contains offices and warehouses.

=== Climate ===
The nearest weather station for long-term data is at RAF Wyton, 3 mi (5 km) north-east of the town centre. More recently Monks Wood, 5 mi (8 km) to the north-west, has also provided data.

Like most of Britain, Huntingdon has a temperate, maritime climate free of temperature extremes, with rainfall spread fairly evenly over the year. The absolute maximum recorded at Wyton was 35.4 °C (95.7 °F) in August 1990; the temperature at Monks Wood rose in July 2022 to 39.8 °C (103.6 °F). The mean annual warmest day is 29.7 °C (85.5 °F), and on 16 days a year will rise to 25.1 °C (77.2 °F) or above.

Typically 46.5 nights of the year report an air frost. The absolute minimum at Wyton was −16.1 °C (3.0 °F) in January 1982. The mean for the annual coldest night of the year is −7.7 °C (18.1 °F).

With annual rainfall around 600 millimetres (23 1/2 inches) a year, the Huntingdon area is among the driest in the UK—111.1 days on average record at least 1 mm of rain. Averages mentioned refer to a mix of the period 1971–2000 and 1991-2020.

Climate data for Monks Wood (Note: Weather station is located 6.0 miles (9.7 km) from the Huntingdon town centre.) (1991–2020 normals, extremes 1963-present)
| Month | Jan | Feb | Mar | Apr | May | Jun | Jul | Aug | Sep | Oct | Nov | Dec | Year |
|---|---|---|---|---|---|---|---|---|---|---|---|---|---|
| Record high °C (°F) | 15.4 (59.7) | 18.6 (65.5) | 23.9 (75.0) | 27.4 (81.3) | 32.9 (91.2) | 35.7 (96.3) | 39.8 (103.6) | 36.2 (97.2) | 32.0 (89.6) | 29.0 (84.2) | 18.3 (64.9) | 16.0 (60.8) | 39.8 (103.6) |
| Mean daily maximum °C (°F) | 7.6 (45.7) | 8.4 (47.1) | 11.1 (52.0) | 14.1 (57.4) | 17.2 (63.0) | 20.0 (68.0) | 22.6 (72.7) | 22.5 (72.5) | 19.5 (67.1) | 15.2 (59.4) | 10.7 (51.3) | 7.8 (46.0) | 14.8 (58.6) |
| Daily mean °C (°F) | 4.5 (40.1) | 4.9 (40.8) | 6.8 (44.2) | 9.2 (48.6) | 12.0 (53.6) | 14.9 (58.8) | 17.3 (63.1) | 17.2 (63.0) | 14.7 (58.5) | 11.3 (52.3) | 7.4 (45.3) | 4.8 (40.6) | 10.5 (50.9) |
| Mean daily minimum °C (°F) | 1.4 (34.5) | 1.4 (34.5) | 2.6 (36.7) | 4.2 (39.6) | 6.8 (44.2) | 9.9 (49.8) | 11.9 (53.4) | 12.0 (53.6) | 10.0 (50.0) | 7.4 (45.3) | 4.2 (39.6) | 1.8 (35.2) | 6.2 (43.2) |
| Record low °C (°F) | −16.6 (2.1) | −13.9 (7.0) | −15.0 (5.0) | −6.1 (21.0) | −3.4 (25.9) | −0.5 (31.1) | 2.8 (37.0) | 2.8 (37.0) | −0.6 (30.9) | −6.5 (20.3) | −8.8 (16.2) | −11.9 (10.6) | −16.6 (2.1) |
| Average precipitation mm (inches) | 48.7 (1.92) | 37.4 (1.47) | 37.8 (1.49) | 42.7 (1.68) | 45.5 (1.79) | 52.3 (2.06) | 55.9 (2.20) | 56.0 (2.20) | 52.6 (2.07) | 63.2 (2.49) | 57.0 (2.24) | 53.3 (2.10) | 602.3 (23.71) |
| Average precipitation days (≥ 1.0 mm) | 10.5 | 9.2 | 8.7 | 8.6 | 8.1 | 8.7 | 8.2 | 8.8 | 8.5 | 10.0 | 11.1 | 10.5 | 111.1 |
| Mean monthly sunshine hours | 57.4 | 80.6 | 118.8 | 159.3 | 191.8 | 184.5 | 195.0 | 184.0 | 147.3 | 111.9 | 66.9 | 57.7 | 1,555.2 |
Source 1: Met Office
Source 2: Starlings Roost Weather

== Demography ==
=== Population ===
Between 1801 and 1901, the current area of Huntingdon consisted of four parishes: Huntingdon All Saints, Huntingdon St Benedict, Huntingdon St John and Huntingdon St Mary. The populations of these were counted in the ten-year UK census and ranged in the period between 2,368 in 1801 and 4,735 in 1891. (The census was omitted in 1941.)

| Parish | 1911 | 1921 | 1931 | 1951 | 1961 | 1971 | 1981 | 1991 | 2001 | 2011 |
|---|---|---|---|---|---|---|---|---|---|---|
| Huntingdon | 4,464 | 4,644 | 4,570 | 5,282 | | | 14,648 | 15,451 | 20,099 | 23,732 |
All population census figures are taken from the report Historic Census figures Cambridgeshire to 2011 by Cambridgeshire Insight. For the censuses of 1961 and 1971, Huntingdon was combined with Godmanchester.

In 2011, the parish covered an area of 2,765 acres (1,119 hectares). The population density in that year was 5,493.1 inhabitants per square mile (2,120.9 inhabitants per square kilometre).

== Culture and community ==
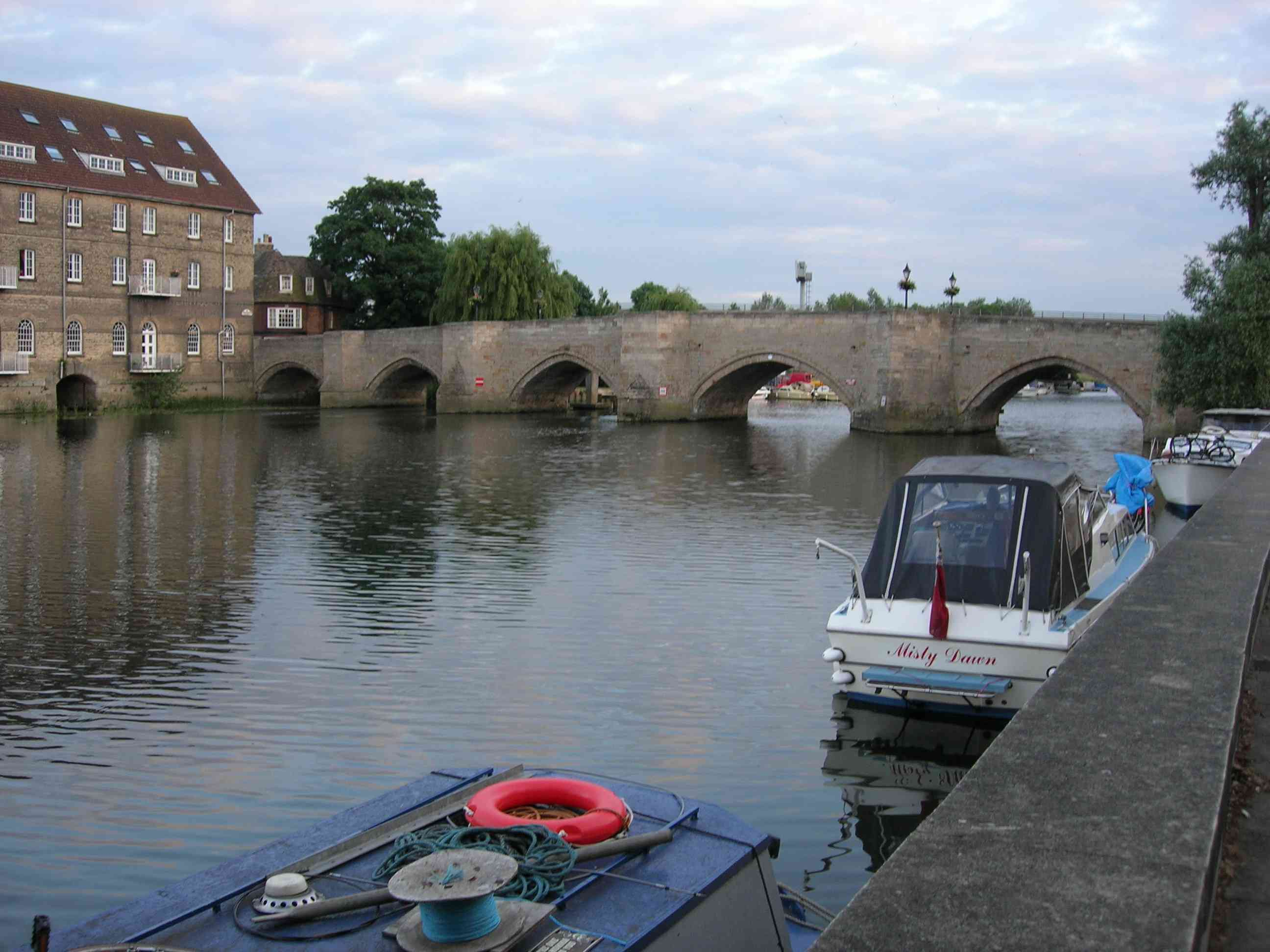
The Old Bridge across the Great Ouse, to Godmanchester

The former Literary and Scientific Institute is now Commemoration Hall.

Following the 2013 closure of RAF Brampton, once home to Headquarters RAF Support Command, there are two operational RAF stations within 4 mi (6 km) of the town: RAF Wyton, once a major flying station but now a facility of the Defence Equipment and Support arm of the MOD; and RAF Alconbury currently occupied by the United States Air Force.

=== Cromwell Museum ===
Part of the medieval infirmary hall of St Johns in the market place became Huntingdon Grammar School. It was attended by Cromwell and by the diarist Samuel Pepys. The building is now the Cromwell Museum, run by Cambridgeshire County Council.

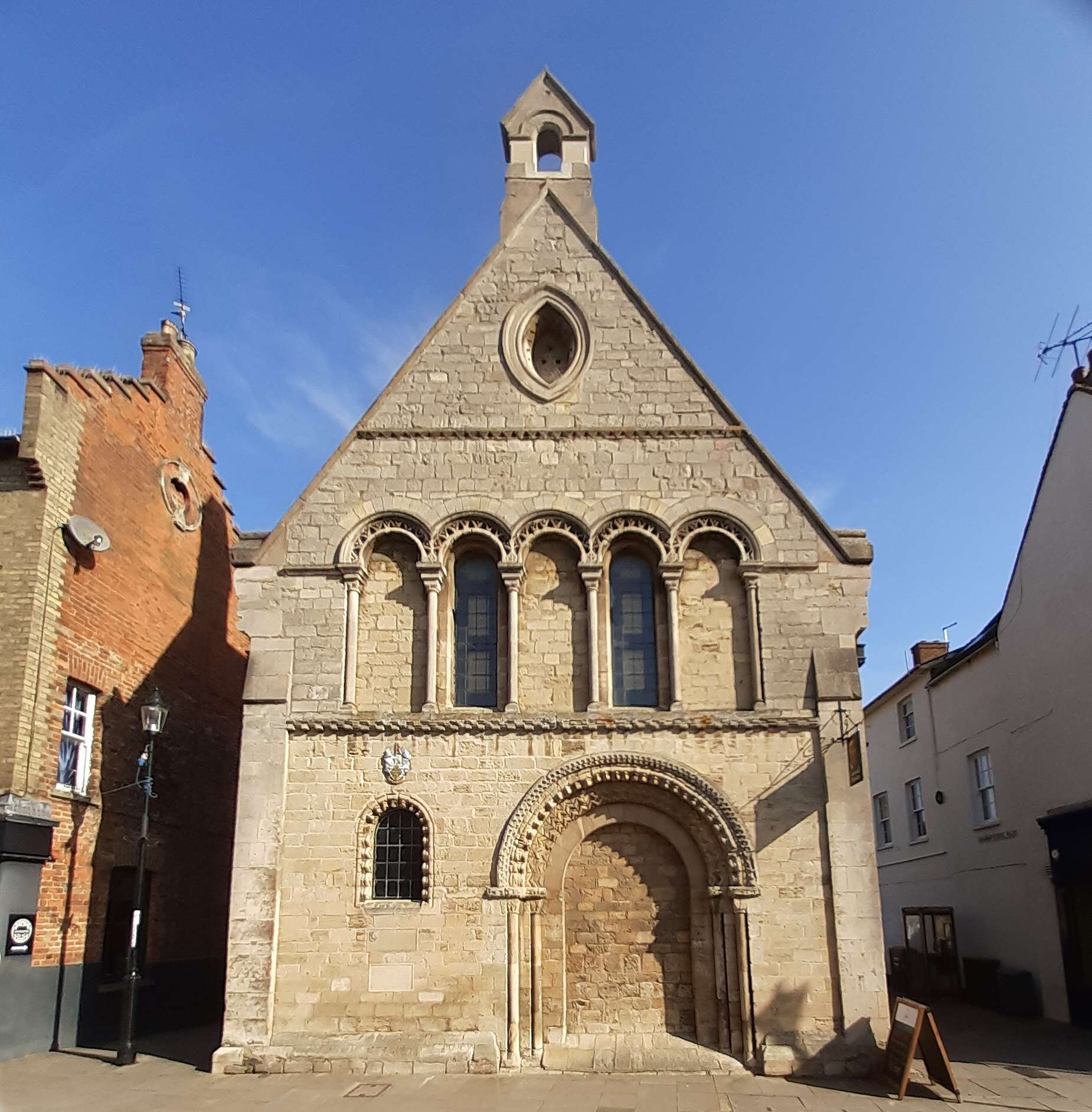
12th century face of the Cromwell Museum from the High Street

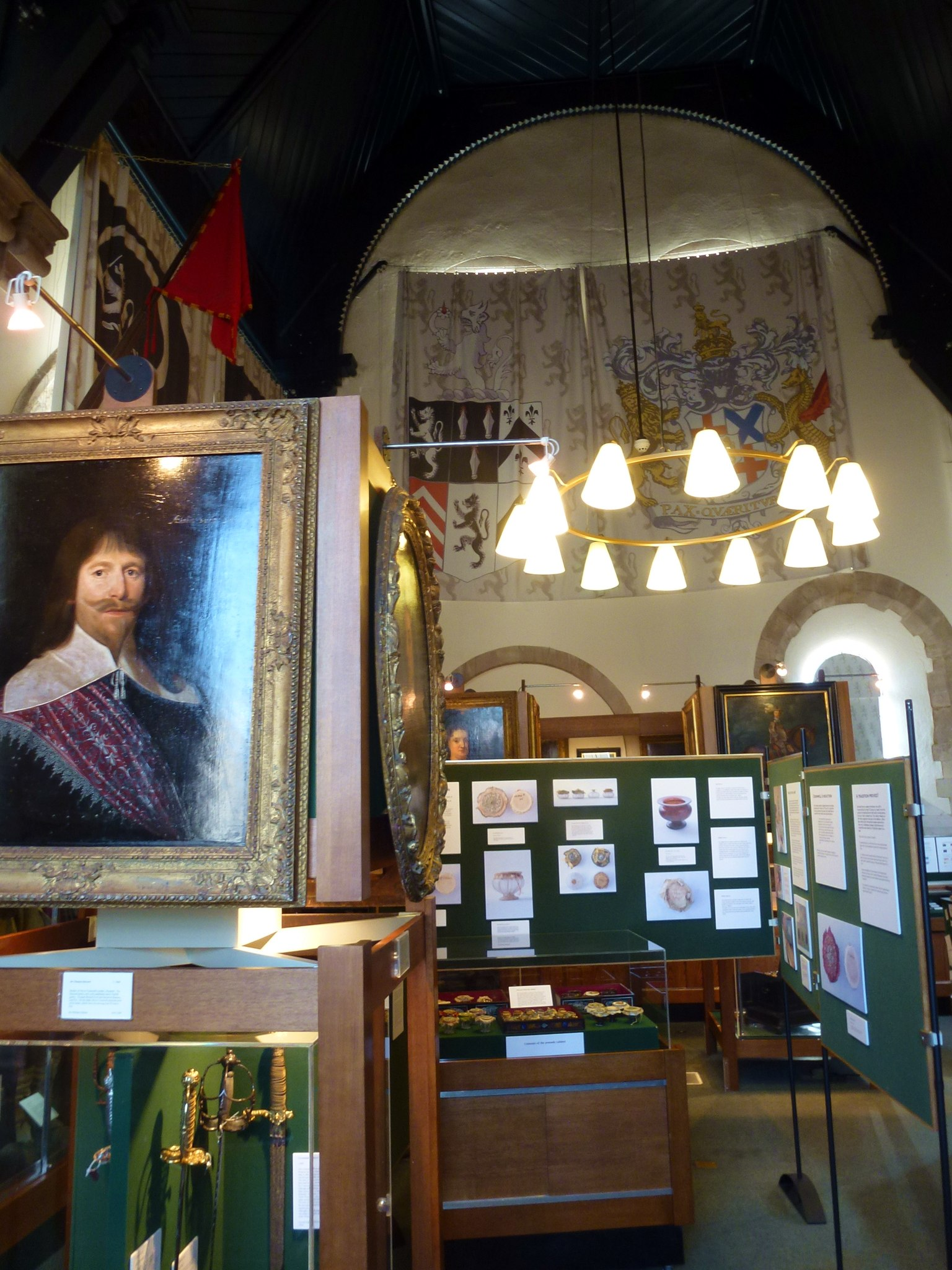
Detail of the interior

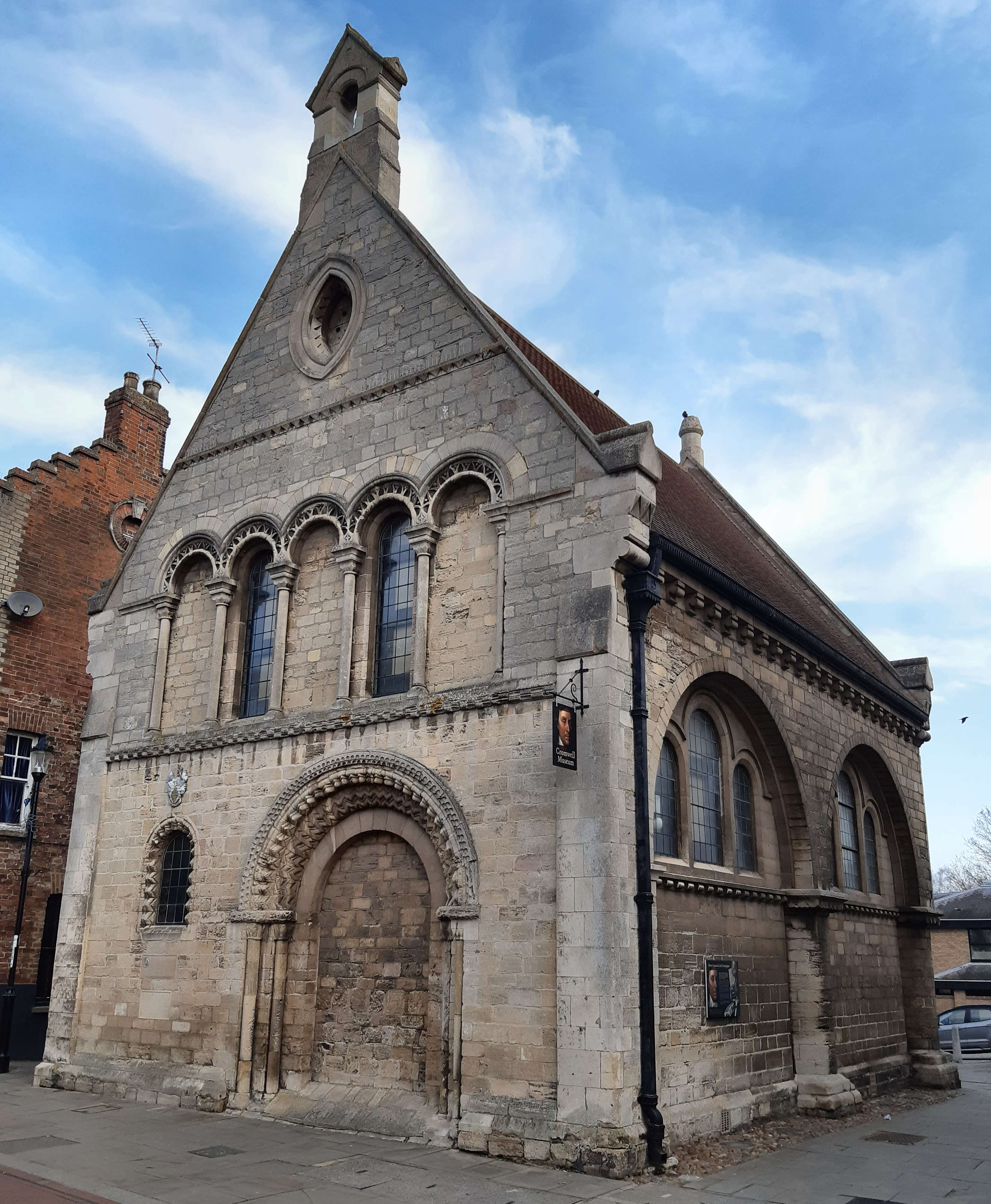
Corner view, showing infilled arches and doorway of the former monastic spital for reuse as Grammar School

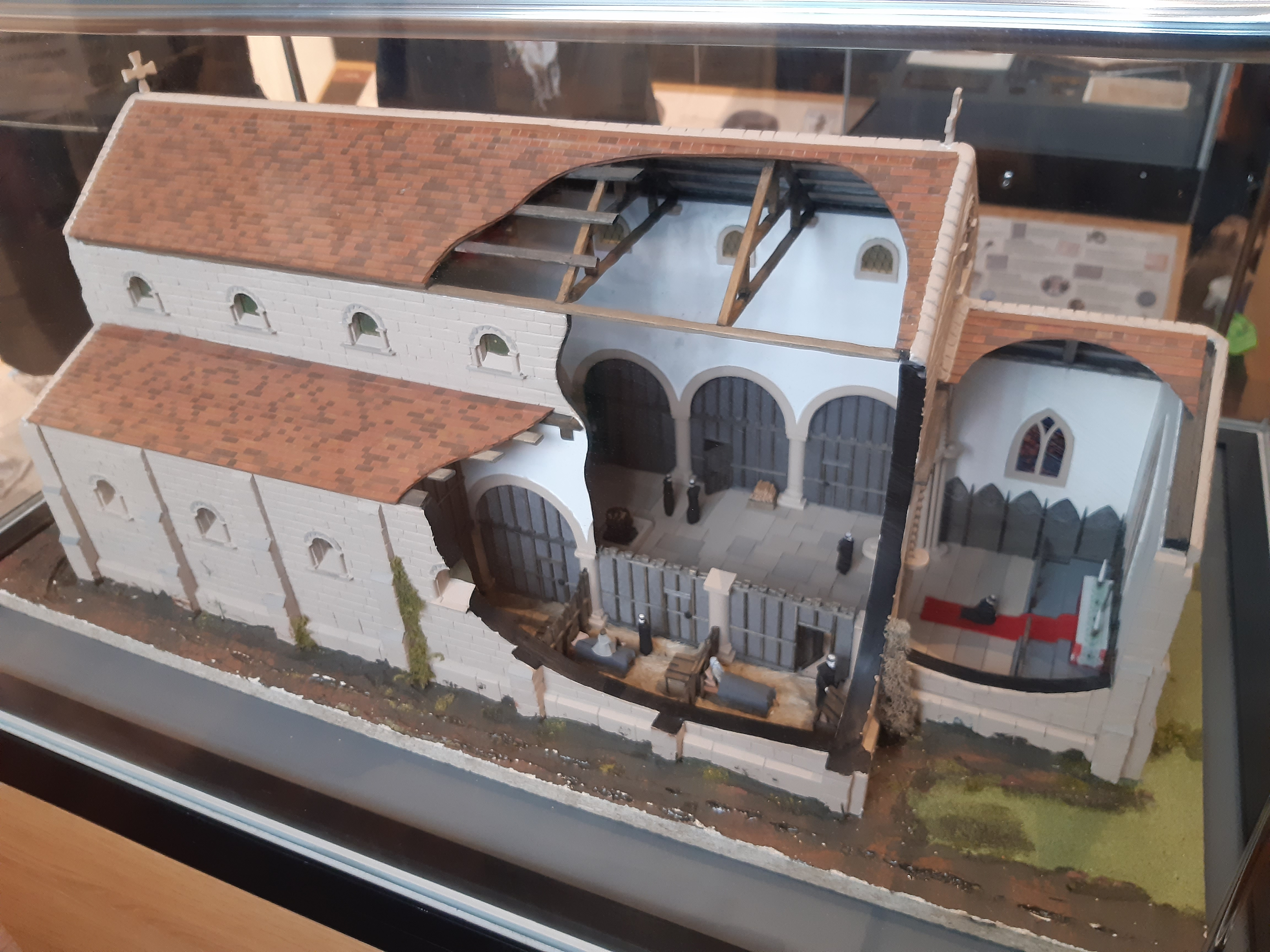
Model of spital that preceded the Grammar School. Arches support the nave, giving access to the now-demolished side buildings. Only the left-hand end of the nave survives.

=== Legends ===
Hinchingbrooke House, once a convent, is said to be haunted. The bridge over the Alconbury Brook named Nun's Bridge is said also to be haunted, by one of the nuns who once lived at the convent. She is said often to be accompanied by another ghost that resembles a nurse. The myth goes that the nun had a monk lover who caused them to be murdered.

== Media ==
Local news and television programmes are provided by BBC East and ITV Anglia. Television signals are received from the Sandy Heath TV transmitter.

Local radio stations are BBC Radio Cambridgeshire, Heart East, Greatest Hits Radio East, Star Radio and HCR FM, a community based station that broadcast from the town.

The Hunts Post is the town's local weekly newspaper.

== Education ==
The local primary schools are Hartford Junior School, Huntingdon Primary School, Thongsley Fields Primary School, St John's Primary School, Stukeley Meadows Primary School and Cromwell Academy Primary School. Spring Common School is a special-needs school. Secondary schools include St Peter's School and Hinchingbrooke School. Further education colleges include Huntingdonshire Regional College, Hinchingbrooke School sixth-form college and St Peter's sixth form.

== Transport ==
=== Railway ===
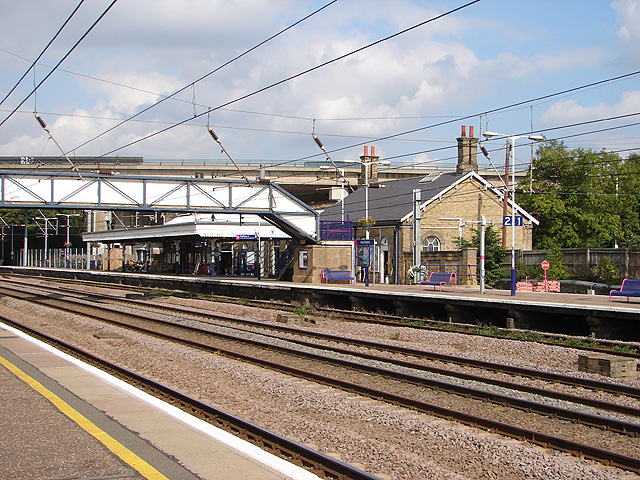
Huntingdon station

Huntingdon railway station is sited on the East Coast Main Line. Services that stop here are operated by Govia Thameslink Railway, on the Thameslink and Great Northern routes.

Great Northern services operate between Peterborough and London Kings Cross station; trains take just over an hour to reach the capital. Thameslink services run between Peterborough and Horsham, in West Sussex, via St Pancras and Blackfriars.

=== Buses ===
Bus services are operated primarily by Stagecoach East and Whippet. Routes serve the town, including Hinchingbrooke Hospital, and connect Huntingdon with Peterborough, St Neots, Ramsey, St Ives and Cambridge.

=== Road ===
Huntingdon is near the junction of the major roads A1 and A14. In 2022, a major bypass of the town opened, diverting A14 traffic to the south.

=== Air ===
Luton and Stansted airports are located within 40 miles (64 km) of the town.

== Religious sites ==
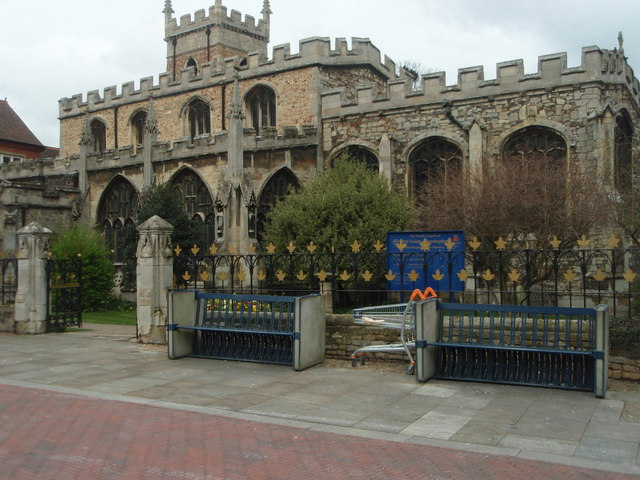
All Saints' Church, from Market Square

There are four Church of England churches in Huntingdon; once there were more, which together with those in the adjacent villages Great and Little Stukeley are members of the Huntingdon Team Ministry in the Diocese of Ely. The four are All Saints' (next to the Market Square), St Mary's (opposite Pathfinder House), St Barnabas (on the Oxmoor estate) and All Saints', Hartford.

Huntingdon Methodist Church is in the High Street. Medway Christian Fellowship is based on Medway Road.

== Sport ==
The highest-ranking football club, Huntingdon Town, plays in the United Counties League. Huntingdon United RGE plays in the Cambridgeshire League.

== Notable residents ==
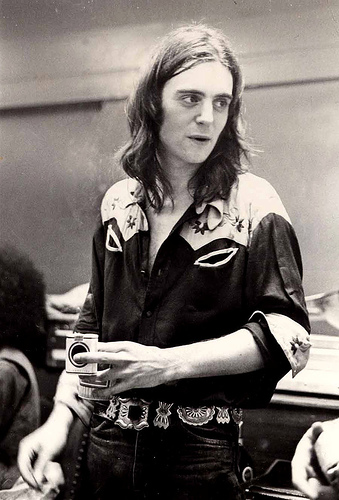
Terry Reid in 1974

Names are in birth order. Data are from the subject's Wikipedia article except where referenced.

=== Arts and entertainment ===
- Henry Compton (Charles Mackenzie, 1805–1877), actor, born in Huntingdon
- George Mackley (1900–1983), wood engraver, born in Huntingdon
- Terry Reid, (1949- 2025), rock vocalist and guitarist, born in Huntingdon
- The Charlottes (formed 1988), indie rock band formed in Huntingdon.
- Ceara O'Neill (born 1990), actor and musician, born in Huntingdon
- Himesh Patel (born 1990), actor, born in Huntingdon

=== Literature ===
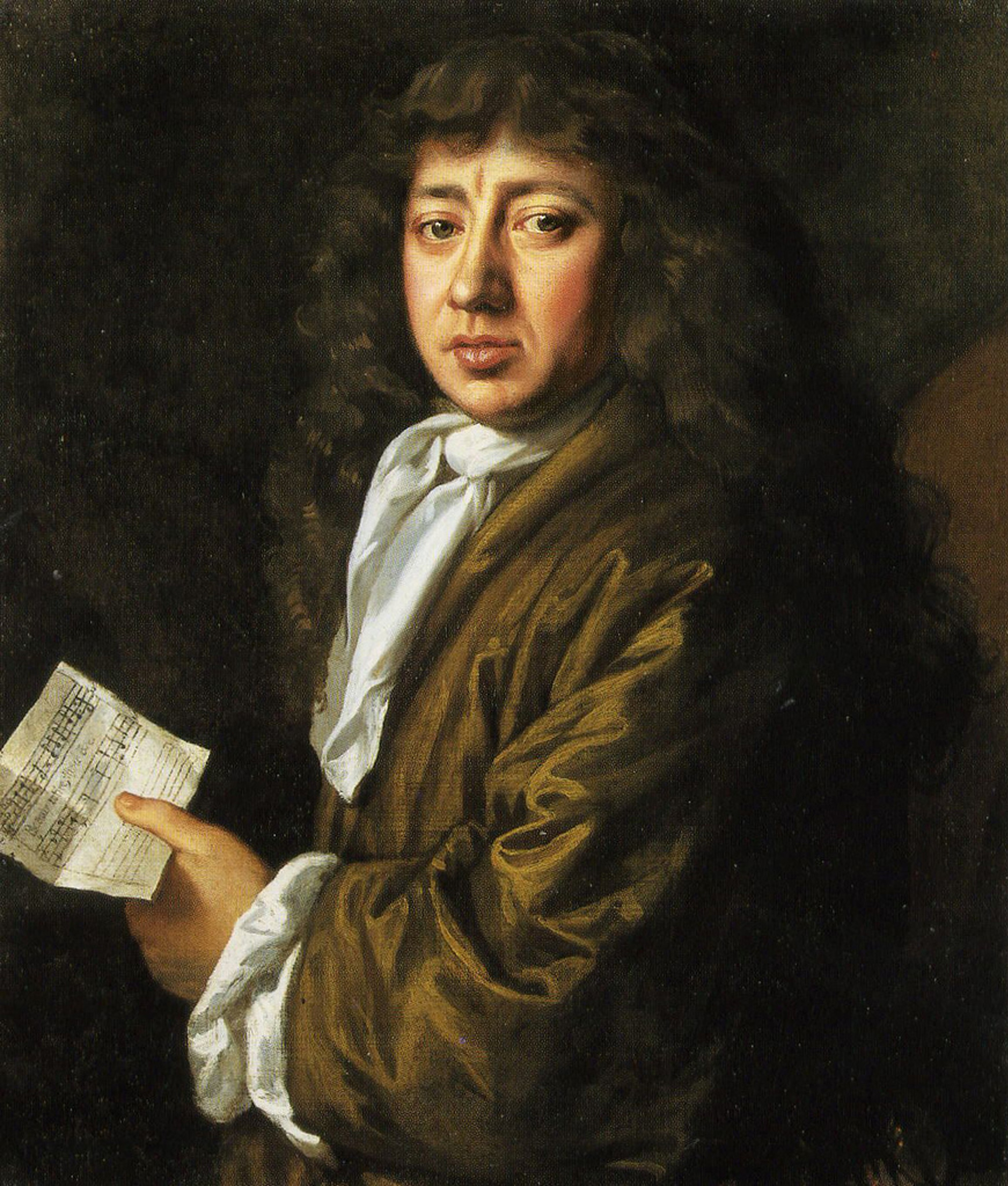
Portrait of Samuel Pepys, by John Hayls, 1666

- Henry of Huntingdon (c. 1088–1157), historian (Historia Anglorum) and Archdeacon of Huntingdon.
- Samuel Pepys (1633–1703), diarist, attended Huntingdon Grammar School in about 1644.
- Basil Montagu (1770–1851), jurist, barrister, writer and philanthropist, and illegitimate son of John Montagu, 4th Earl of Sandwich and Martha Ray
- Robert Carruthers (1799–1878), local historian (History of Huntingdon) and journalist

=== Religion ===
- Christina of Markyate (c. 1096–98 – c. 1155), anchoress and prioress, was born in Huntingdon.
- John Swanel Inskip (1816–1884), American minister and evangelist, was born in Huntingdon.

=== Politics ===
Oliver Cromwell, 1646

- David, Earl of Huntingdon (c. 1144–1219), Scottish prince, was born in Huntingdon.
- Richard Patrick (died 1566), MP for Huntingdon in 1559
- Oliver Cromwell (1599–1658), Lord Protector, was born in Huntingdon.
- Edward Montagu, 1st Earl of Sandwich (1625–1672), English Civil War general and Restoration politician, attended Huntingdon Grammar School.
- Richard Cromwell (1626–1712), Lord Protector (1658–59), was born in Huntingdon.
- Henry Cromwell (1628–1674), Lord Deputy of Ireland and chancellor of Trinity College, Dublin, was born in Huntingdon.
- Charlie Elphicke (born 1971), Conservative member of Parliament for Dover 2010–19 and sex offender, was born in Huntingdon.

=== Science and engineering ===
- Michael Foster (1836–1907), physiologist and academic, was born in Huntingdon.
- Robert William Edis (1839–1927), architect and writer on decoration, was born in Huntingdon and educated at Huntingdon Grammar School.
- Walter Samuel Millard (1864–1952), naturalist and conservationist, was born in Huntingdon.

=== Sport ===
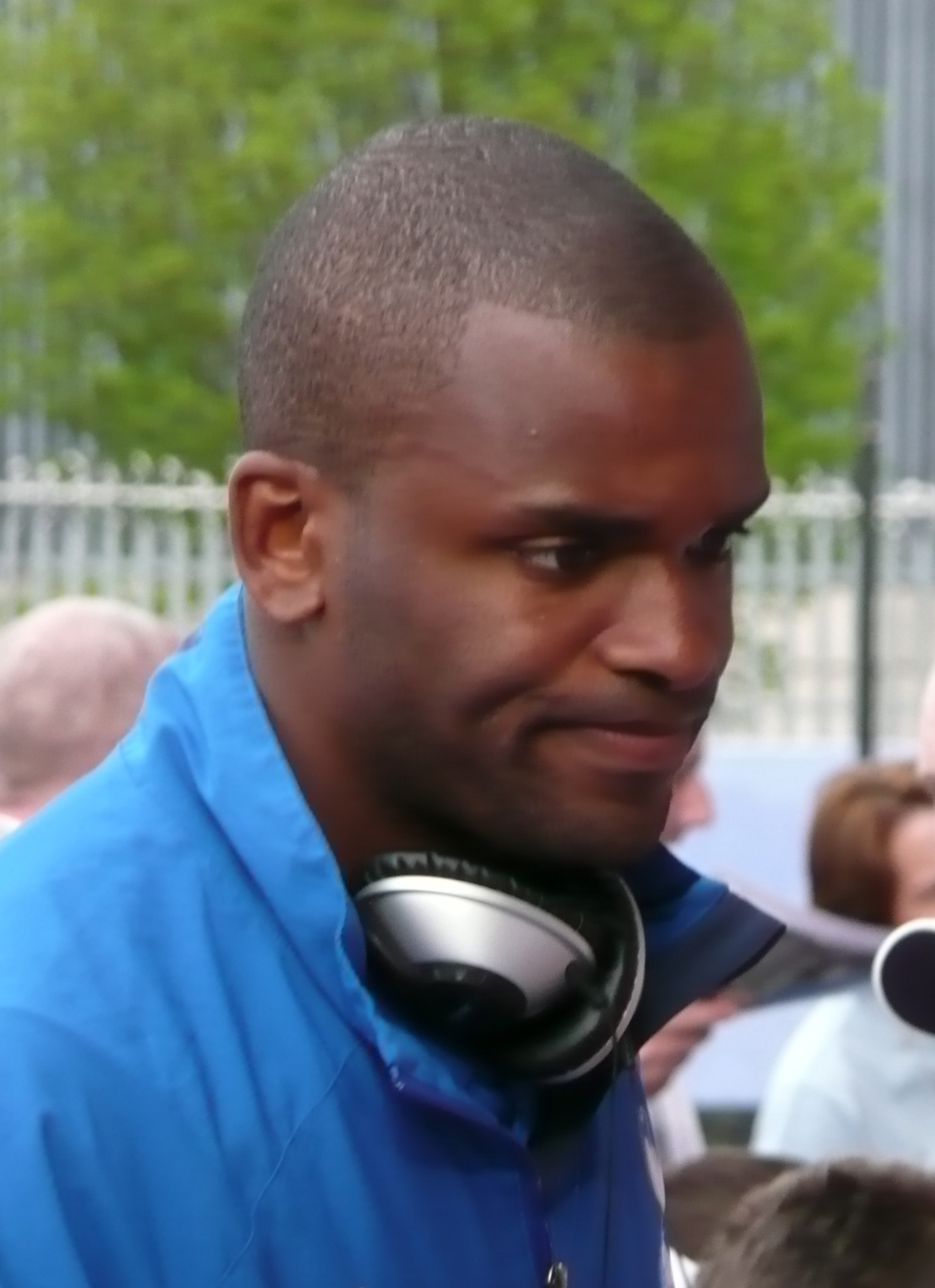
Darren Bent in 2008

- Walter Yarnold (1893–1978), first-class cricketer, was born in Huntingdon.
- Josh Gifford, (1941–2012), National Hunt jockey and trainer, was born in Huntingdon.
- Oliver Gavin (born 1972), racing car driver, was born in Huntingdon.
- Charlotte Edwards (born 1979), international women's cricketer, was born in Huntingdon.
- Darren Bent (born 1984), footballer, was raised in Huntingdon.
- Harriet Lee (born 1991), Paralympic swimmer, was born in Huntingdon.
- James Sykes (born 1992), first-class cricketer, was born in Huntingdon.
- James Kettleborough (born 1992), first-class cricketer, was born in Huntingdon.
- Alex Martin (born 1992), first-class cricketer, was born in Huntingdon.
- Todd Kane (born 1993), footballer, was born in Huntingdon.
- George Furbank (born 1996), England international professional rugby union player was born in Huntingdon

== International relations ==
Huntingdon is twinned with:

- Salon de Provence, France
- Szentendre, Hungary
- Wertheim am Main, Germany
- Gubbio, Italy

== Freedom of the Town ==
The following people and military units have received the Freedom of the Town of Huntingdon.

=== Individuals ===
- Gordon Peacock: 7 May 2022
- Derek Bristow: 7 May 2022

=== Military Units ===
- RAF Wyton: 17 September 1955
- RAF Brampton: 1995
- The Royal Anglian Regiment: 21 January 2010
- The Princess of Wales's Royal Regiment: 23 November 2017
- The 501st Combat Support Wing, USAF: 21 September 2018

== See also ==
- Earl of Huntingdon
- History of Huntingdonshire
