= Grade I listed buildings in Cambridgeshire =

Cambridgeshire shown within England

There are approximately 372,905 listed buildings in England and 2.5% of these are Grade I. This page is a list of these buildings in the county of Cambridgeshire, by district.

== City of Peterborough ==
Name	Location	Type	Completed (Note: The date given is the date used by Historic England as significant for the initial building or that of an important part in the structure's description.)	Date designated	Grid ref. (Note: The grid reference is based on the British national grid reference system, sometimes known as OSGB36, used by the Ordnance Survey.) Geo-coordinates	Entry number (Note: The "List Entry Number" is a unique number assigned to each listed building and scheduled monument by Historic England.)	Image
Church of St Mary	Bainton, City of Peterborough	Church	Early 13th century	19 March 1962	TF0944806050; 52°38′28″N 0°23′02″W	1309975	Church of St Mary More images
Village Cross	Bainton, City of Peterborough	Village Cross	Medieval	19 March 1962	TF0941206015; 52°38′27″N 0°23′04″W	1126875	Village Cross More images
Church of St John the Baptist	Barnack, City of Peterborough	Church	Saxon	19 March 1962	TF0793305060; 52°37′57″N 0°24′24″W	1126844	Church of St John the Baptist More images
North Forecourt Area Railings and Gates at Burghley House	Burghley Park, Barnack, City of Peterborough	Gate	18th century	16 January 1956	TF0483906166; 52°38′35″N 0°27′07″W	1331234	North Forecourt Area Railings and Gates at Burghley House More images
Bath House or Banqueting House at Burghley House	Burghley Park, Barnack, City of Peterborough	Bath House	Circa 1756-1778	19 March 1962	TF0503305806; 52°38′23″N 0°26′57″W	1331235	Bath House or Banqueting House at Burghley House More images
Stables with Forecourt Railings and Service Wings and Servants Wing, Brewery and Porters Lodge at Burghley House	Burghley Park, Barnack, City of Peterborough	Porters Lodge	1756–79	16 January 1956	TF0495606086; 52°38′33″N 0°27′01″W	1127502	Stables with Forecourt Railings and Service Wings and Servants Wing, Brewery and Porters Lodge at Burghley House More images
The Orangery, Burghley House	Burghley Park, Barnack, City of Peterborough	Orangery	1756–63	16 January 1956	TF0486006089; 52°38′33″N 0°27′06″W	1127503	The Orangery, Burghley House More images
Church of St Kyneburgha	Castor	Church	Saxon	15 December 1955	TL1246898530; 52°34′23″N 0°20′31″W	1126803	Church of St Kyneburgha More images
Milton Hall	Milton Park, Castor, City of Peterborough	House	c. 1600	15 December 1955	TL1448699849; 52°35′04″N 0°18′42″W	1162643	Milton Hall More images
Stables Adjoining East of Milton Hall	Milton Hall, Castor, City of Peterborough	Kitchen	1690	15 December 1955	TL1454599866; 52°35′04″N 0°18′39″W	1331549	Upload Photo
Church of St Stephen	Etton	Church	13th century	15 December 1955	TF1408406591; 52°38′42″N 0°18′55″W	1126818	Church of St Stephen More images
Church of St Benedict	Glinton	Church	12th century	15 December 1955	TF1541605974; 52°38′21″N 0°17′45″W	1163848	Church of St Benedict More images
Church of St Botolph	Helpston, City of Peterborough	Church	Saxon	15 December 1955	TF1220205528; 52°38′09″N 0°20′36″W	1164217	Church of St Botolph More images
Church of St Mary	Marholm, City of Peterborough	Church	12th century	15 December 1955	TF1462401916; 52°36′11″N 0°18′32″W	1317603	Church of St Mary More images
Church of St Peter	Maxey, City of Peterborough	Church	Early 12th century	15 December 1955	TF1200907932; 52°39′27″N 0°20′44″W	1331592	Church of St Peter More images
Church of St Andrew	Northborough	Church	Late 12th century to 13th century	15 December 1955	TF1525207959; 52°39′26″N 0°17′51″W	1126693	Church of St Andrew More images
Northborough Manor House	Northborough, City of Peterborough	Manor House	1330–40	15 December 1955	TF1510007829; 52°39′22″N 0°17′59″W	1126697	Upload Photo
The Gate House and Stable Range to North of Northborough Manor House	Northborough, City of Peterborough	Gatehouse	17th century	15 December 1955	TF1508007848; 52°39′22″N 0°18′00″W	1317150	The Gate House and Stable Range to North of Northborough Manor House More images
Church of the Holy Trinity	Orton Longueville, City of Peterborough	Church	c. 1240	13 December 1957	TL1682696516; 52°33′14″N 0°16′42″W	1166191	Church of the Holy Trinity More images
Church of St Mary	Orton Waterville, City of Peterborough	Church	Late 13th century	13 December 1957	TL1563296076; 52°33′01″N 0°17′46″W	1166376	Church of St Mary More images
Church of St Pega	Peakirk, City of Peterborough	Church	11th century	15 December 1955	TF1681306696; 52°38′44″N 0°16′30″W	1221288	Church of St Pega More images
Walcot Hall	Walcot, Southorpe, City of Peterborough	House	Circa 1674-8	19 March 1962	TF0790704162; 52°37′28″N 0°24′26″W	1331241	Walcot Hall More images
Burghley House	Burghley Park, St Martin's Without, City of Peterborough	Country House	c. 1556	16 January 1956	TF0477806074; 52°38′32″N 0°27′11″W	1127501	Burghley House More images
The Bridge	Burghley Park, St Martin's Without, City of Peterborough	Bridge	1775	29 March 1962	TF0434506008; 52°38′30″N 0°27′34″W	1331236	The Bridge More images
Church of St Michael	Sutton, City of Peterborough	Church	Norman	15 December 1955	TL0952398728; 52°34′31″N 0°23′07″W	1127517	Church of St Michael More images
Church of St Mary and St Botolph	Thorney, City of Peterborough	Abbey	972	22 October 1952	TF2823604205; 52°37′14″N 0°06′26″W	1331263	Church of St Mary and St Botolph More images
Thorney Abbey and Abbey House	Thorney, City of Peterborough	House	Late 16th century	22 October 1952	TF2819104180; 52°37′13″N 0°06′28″W	1127481	Thorney Abbey and Abbey House More images
Church of St Andrew	Thornhaugh, City of Peterborough	Church	Late 12th century	19 March 1962	TF0698300584; 52°35′33″N 0°25′20″W	1225298	Church of St Andrew More images
Church of St Andrew	Ufford, City of Peterborough	Church	13th century	19 March 1962	TF0933804035; 52°37′23″N 0°23′10″W	1127466	Church of St Andrew More images
Ufford Hall	Ufford, City of Peterborough	Flats	1962	19 March 1962	TF0930404339; 52°37′33″N 0°23′12″W	1357128	Ufford Hall More images
Church of St John the Baptist	Upton, City of Peterborough	Church	Early 12th century	15 December 1955	TF1102200583; 52°35′30″N 0°21′45″W	1127440	Church of St John the Baptist More images
Church of St Mary the Virgin	Wansford, City of Peterborough	Church	c. 1200	19 March 1962	TL0734299258; 52°34′50″N 0°25′02″W	1127442	Church of St Mary the Virgin More images
Wansford Bridge	Wansford, City of Peterborough	Bridge	1577	24 February 1982	TL0749999118; 52°34′45″N 0°24′54″W	1127445	Wansford Bridge More images
Church of All Saints	Wittering, City of Peterborough	Church	Saxon	19 March 1962	TF0563402017; 52°36′20″N 0°26′30″W	1226058	Church of All Saints More images
Gateway and Walls to Rectangular Enclosure, North East, East and South East of Wothorpe Hall	Wothorpe, City of Peterborough	Gateway and Walls	Early 17th century	19 March 1962	TF0261005282; 52°38′08″N 0°29′07″W	1127450	Gateway and Walls to Rectangular Enclosure, North East, East and South East of Wothorpe Hall
Wothorpe Towers (Hall)	Wothorpe, City of Peterborough	Country House	Circa 1600 Ruins	19 March 1962	TF0253405264; 52°38′08″N 0°29′11″W	1265972	Wothorpe Towers (Hall) More images
Bishops Gate	Peterborough, City of Peterborough	Gate	c. 1220	7 February 1952	TL1929298626; 52°34′21″N 0°14′28″W	1126939	Bishops Gate More images
Bishop's Palace	Peterborough, City of Peterborough	Bishops Palace	Gothic	7 February 1952	TL1934398572; 52°34′19″N 0°14′26″W	1331518	Upload Photo
Canonry House	Peterborough, City of Peterborough	Clergy House	Medieval core	7 February 1952	TL1949898567; 52°34′19″N 0°14′17″W	1126931	Canonry House More images
Chapel of St Thomas of Canterbury	Peterborough, City of Peterborough	Chapel	1330	7 February 1952	TL1925998655; 52°34′22″N 0°14′30″W	1310088	Chapel of St Thomas of Canterbury
Cathedral Church of St Peter, St Paul and St Andrew	Peterborough, City of Peterborough	Cathedral	1118	7 February 1952	TL1941698645; 52°34′21″N 0°14′22″W	1331492	Cathedral Church of St Peter, St Paul and St Andrew More images
Chapter Office	Peterborough, City of Peterborough	Ecclesiastical Office	18th century	7 February 1952	TL1946098558; 52°34′18″N 0°14′20″W	1126933	Chapter Office More images
Church of St Augustine	Peterborough, City of Peterborough	Church	14th century	7 February 1952	TL1858297773; 52°33′54″N 0°15′07″W	1126964	Church of St Augustine More images
Church of St John the Baptist	Stanground, City of Peterborough	Church	c1300 or early 14th century	14 November 1974	TL1999497482; 52°33′43″N 0°13′53″W	1126699	Church of St John the Baptist More images
Church of St Margaret	Fletton, City of Peterborough	Church	c. 1150	14 November 1974	TL1975097086; 52°33′30″N 0°14′06″W	1309143	Church of St Margaret More images
Deanery Gateway and Wall	Peterborough, City of Peterborough	Gate	Early 16th century	7 February 1952	TL1933098683; 52°34′22″N 0°14′26″W	1331494	Deanery Gateway and Wall More images
Diocesan House	Peterborough, City of Peterborough	Building	14th-century origins	7 February 1952	TL1932498622; 52°34′20″N 0°14′27″W	1126938	Diocesan House More images
Former Barns and Stabling to South of No 20, Precincts	Peterborough, City of Peterborough	Garage	1952	7 February 1952	TL1943598484; 52°34′16″N 0°14′21″W	1126930	Former Barns and Stabling to South of No 20, Precincts
Former Outbuilding to Laurel Court Facing Table Hall	Peterborough, City of Peterborough	Outbuilding	18th century	7 May 1973	TL1943898600; 52°34′20″N 0°14′21″W	1161646	Upload Photo
Former Stables to Thorpe Hall	Longthorpe, City of Peterborough	Stable		7 February 1952	TL1700898610; 52°34′22″N 0°16′30″W	1126913	Former Stables to Thorpe Hall
Garden Wall and Gates to Laurel Court	Peterborough, City of Peterborough	Gate		7 May 1973	TL1941398600; 52°34′20″N 0°14′22″W	1331516	Upload Photo
Gateway from Garden to Stables of Thorpe Hall	Longthorpe, City of Peterborough	Gate		7 February 1952	TL1696898595; 52°34′21″N 0°16′32″W	1126914	Upload Photo
Great Cloister	Peterborough, City of Peterborough	Cloister	Early English	7 May 1973	TL1938098590; 52°34′19″N 0°14′24″W	1126937	Upload Photo
Great Gate (Outer Gate, Marsh Foregate)	Peterborough, City of Peterborough	Gate	c1174-94	7 February 1952	TL1925198640; 52°34′21″N 0°14′30″W	1161429	Great Gate (Outer Gate, Marsh Foregate)
Hostry Passage and Little Dorter	Peterborough, City of Peterborough	Refectory	Ruins	7 May 1973	TL1940898554; 52°34′18″N 0°14′22″W	1331517	Hostry Passage and Little Dorter More images
King's Lodging (including Abbot's Prison)	Peterborough, City of Peterborough	Shop	1973	7 February 1952	TL1925198632; 52°34′21″N 0°14′31″W	1161737	King's Lodging (including Abbot's Prison) More images
Laurel Court	Peterborough, City of Peterborough	House	Early 18th century	7 February 1952	TL1943098597; 52°34′20″N 0°14′21″W	1310019	Laurel Court More images
Longthorpe Tower House	Longthorpe, City of Peterborough	Farmhouse	c. 1263	7 February 1952	TL1620298380; 52°34′15″N 0°17′13″W	1162040	Longthorpe Tower House More images
Parish Church of All Saints	Paston, Peterborough	Church	1756	7 February 1952	TF1810102269; 52°36′19″N 0°15′27″W	1162114	Parish Church of All Saints More images
Parish Church of St Botolph	Longthorpe, Peterborough	Bell Tower	1869	7 February 1952	TL1630498389; 52°34′15″N 0°17′07″W	1331544	Parish Church of St Botolph More images
Parish Church of St John the Baptist	Werrington, Peterborough	Parish Church	Early 12th century	7 February 1952	TF1698803152; 52°36′49″N 0°16′25″W	1309749	Parish Church of St John the Baptist More images
Parish Church of St John the Baptist	Peterborough, City of Peterborough	Parish Church	1402	7 February 1952	TL1911198662; 52°34′22″N 0°14′38″W	1331524	Parish Church of St John the Baptist More images
Table Hall	Peterborough, City of Peterborough	House	15th century	7 February 1952	TL1947198582; 52°34′19″N 0°14′19″W	1126932	Table Hall More images
Thorpe Hall	Longthorpe, City of Peterborough	House	1653–6	7 February 1952	TL1705098600; 52°34′21″N 0°16′27″W	1126912	Thorpe Hall More images
Walls, gatepiers and Entrance Gates to Thorpe Hall	Longthorpe, City of Peterborough	Gate		7 May 1973	TL1705498656; 52°34′23″N 0°16′27″W	1331545	Walls, gatepiers and Entrance Gates to Thorpe Hall More images
Well in the Great Cloister	Peterborough, City of Peterborough	Steps	Norman	7 May 1973	TL1939398612; 52°34′20″N 0°14′23″W	1161668	Well in the Great Cloister
No 16, Precincts	Peterborough, City of Peterborough	House	1762	7 February 1952	TL1947298574; 52°34′19″N 0°14′19″W	1331514	No 16, Precincts More images
No 19, Precincts	Peterborough, City of Peterborough	House	13th century	7 February 1952	TL1943598570; 52°34′19″N 0°14′21″W	1331515	No 19, Precincts

== East Cambridgeshire ==
Name	Location	Type	Completed	Date designated	Grid ref. Geo-coordinates	Entry number	Image
Church of Holy Trinity	Bottisham, East Cambridgeshire	Parish Church	Early 13th century	19 August 1959	TL5455860489; 52°13′15″N 0°15′40″E	1127115	Church of Holy Trinity More images
Church of St Mary	Burwell, East Cambridgeshire	Parish Church	12th century	19 August 1959	TL5895866063; 52°16′11″N 0°19′41″E	1126396	Church of St Mary More images
Parish Church of St Mary and the Holy Ghost in Heaven	Cheveley, East Cambridgeshire	Parish Church	Early 14th century	19 August 1959	TL6847560838; 52°13′12″N 0°27′54″E	1318059	Parish Church of St Mary and the Holy Ghost in Heaven More images
Parish Church of St Margaret	Chippenham, East Cambridgeshire	Parish Church	12th century	19 August 1959	TL6635169804; 52°18′04″N 0°26′18″E	1161953	Parish Church of St Margaret More images
Church of St Peter-ad-vincula	Coveney, East Cambridgeshire	Parish Church	13th century	5 February 1952	TL4894182187; 52°25′03″N 0°11′19″E	1331472	Church of St Peter-ad-vincula More images
Parish Church of St Leonard	Little Downham, East Cambridgeshire	Parish Church	12th century	5 February 1952	TL5263584172; 52°26′03″N 0°14′38″E	1127022	Parish Church of St Leonard More images
Parish Church of St Mary	Dullingham, East Cambridgeshire	Parish Church	13th century	19 August 1959	TL6315657697; 52°11′36″N 0°23′08″E	1318002	Parish Church of St Mary More images
The Almonry	Ely, East Cambridgeshire	Almonry/Restaurant	Late 12th century	23 September 1950	TL5424680291; 52°23′56″N 0°15′56″E	1126503	The Almonry More images
Sacristy Gate and Goldsmiths Tower	Ely, East Cambridgeshire	Gate	1322	23 September 1950	TL5419780313; 52°23′57″N 0°15′54″E	1126504	Sacristy Gate and Goldsmiths Tower More images
Barn and Storehouse of the Monastery	Ely, East Cambridgeshire	House	18th century	23 September 1950	TL5400980000; 52°23′47″N 0°15′43″E	1126508	Barn and Storehouse of the Monastery More images
St John's Farmhouse	Ely, East Cambridgeshire	House	C16-C17	23 September 1950	TL5350680210; 52°23′54″N 0°15′17″E	1167882	St John's Farmhouse More images
Barn to South-west of St John's Farmhouse	Ely, East Cambridgeshire	Barn	13th century	23 September 1950	TL5339280178; 52°23′53″N 0°15′11″E	1126456	Upload Photo
Barn to the North of St John's Farmhouse	Ely, East Cambridgeshire	Barn	13th century	23 September 1950	TL5350580231; 52°23′55″N 0°15′17″E	1126455	Upload Photo
Dovecote to St John's Farm	Ely, East Cambridgeshire	Dovecote/House	13th century	23 September 1950	TL5352680198; 52°23′54″N 0°15′18″E	1331739	Upload Photo
Bishop's Palace (the Palace School)	Ely, East Cambridgeshire	Bishops Palace	1486–1501	23 September 1950	TL5395580248; 52°23′55″N 0°15′41″E	1296856	Bishop's Palace (the Palace School) More images
Cathedral of the Holy Trinity	Ely, East Cambridgeshire	Cathedral	1083	23 September 1950	TL5404680281; 52°23′56″N 0°15′46″E	1331690	Cathedral of the Holy Trinity More images
Cellarers House (boarding House of King's School)	Ely, East Cambridgeshire	House	1770	23 September 1950	TL5413680178; 52°23′53″N 0°15′50″E	1126510	Cellarers House (boarding House of King's School) More images
Ely Porta	Ely, East Cambridgeshire	Gate	1397–1418	23 September 1950	TL5400880029; 52°23′48″N 0°15′43″E	1167340	Ely Porta More images
Guest Quarters of the Monastery	Ely, East Cambridgeshire	Guest House	14th century	23 June 1950	TL5401880128; 52°23′51″N 0°15′44″E	1167322	Guest Quarters of the Monastery More images
Parish Church of St Mary	Ely, East Cambridgeshire	Parish Church	Early 13th century	23 September 1950	TL5384980241; 52°23′55″N 0°15′35″E	1126519	Parish Church of St Mary More images
Powcher's Hall	Ely, East Cambridgeshire	Monastery	12th century	23 September 1950	TL5415680201; 52°23′53″N 0°15′52″E	1167407	Powcher's Hall More images
Prior Crauden's Chapel	Ely, East Cambridgeshire	Private Chapel	1324–1325	23 September 1950	TL5404680141; 52°23′51″N 0°15′46″E	1331686	Prior Crauden's Chapel More images
Prior's House (boarding House of the Kings School)	Ely, East Cambridgeshire	Building	17th century	23 September 1950	TL5405580149; 52°23′52″N 0°15′46″E	1167326	Prior's House (boarding House of the Kings School) More images
Stables to Bishop's Palace	Ely, East Cambridgeshire	Stable	13th century	23 September 1950	TL5400380161; 52°23′52″N 0°15′43″E	1126481	Stables to Bishop's Palace
The Black Hostelry and Cellarers Chamber	Ely, East Cambridgeshire	Hostel	c1291-1292	23 September 1950	TL5415680181; 52°23′53″N 0°15′52″E	1167456	The Black Hostelry and Cellarers Chamber More images
The Chapel of the Infirmary (deanery)	Ely, East Cambridgeshire	Deanery	18th century	23 September 1950	TL5419880185; 52°23′53″N 0°15′54″E	1331688	The Chapel of the Infirmary (deanery)
The Dark Cloister	Ely, East Cambridgeshire	Wall	Mid 13th century	23 September 1950	TL5412980195; 52°23′53″N 0°15′50″E	1331687	The Dark Cloister More images
The Great Hall (Bishop's Residence)	Ely, East Cambridgeshire	Bishops Palace	Mid 13th century	23 September 1950	TL5405480174; 52°23′52″N 0°15′46″E	1167260	The Great Hall (Bishop's Residence) More images
The Painted Chamber (Walsingham House)	Ely, East Cambridgeshire	Clergy House	Early 14th century	23 September 1950	TL5417280194; 52°23′53″N 0°15′52″E	1126509	The Painted Chamber (Walsingham House) More images
The Queen's Hall (headmaster's House)	Ely, East Cambridgeshire	Teachers House	1330	23 September 1950	TL5402880172; 52°23′52″N 0°15′45″E	1126505	The Queen's Hall (headmaster's House) More images
Wall to the Garden of the Almonry and Painted Chamber	Ely, East Cambridgeshire	Gate	14th century	19 June 1972	TL5426880290; 52°23′56″N 0°15′58″E	1331684	Wall to the Garden of the Almonry and Painted Chamber More images
Walls to the Guest Quarters of the Monastery and Ely Porta	Ely, East Cambridgeshire	Wall		19 June 1972	TL5402280094; 52°23′50″N 0°15′44″E	1126506	Walls to the Guest Quarters of the Monastery and Ely Porta
Parish Church of St Peters	Fordham, East Cambridgeshire	Parish Church	late C12-early 13th century	19 August 1959	TL6334870722; 52°18′37″N 0°23′41″E	1309769	Parish Church of St Peters More images
Church of Holy Trinity	Haddenham, East Cambridgeshire	Parish Church	Late 13th century	5 February 1952	TL4639175638; 52°21′33″N 0°08′54″E	1331475	Church of Holy Trinity More images
Church of St Andrew	Isleham, East Cambridgeshire	Parish Church	Earlier	19 August 1959	TL6437274409; 52°20′35″N 0°24′41″E	1126475	Church of St Andrew More images
Priory Church of St Margaret of Antioch	Isleham, East Cambridgeshire	Benedictine Alien Cell	c1080-1090	1 December 1951	TL6424574349; 52°20′33″N 0°24′35″E	1126476	Priory Church of St Margaret of Antioch More images
All Saints Parish Church	Kirtling, East Cambridgeshire	Parish Church	12th century	19 August 1959	TL6868657616; 52°11′28″N 0°27′59″E	1126290	All Saints Parish Church More images
Kirtling Tower	Kirtling, East Cambridgeshire	Castle	Saxon	1 December 1951	TL6868357441; 52°11′22″N 0°27′59″E	1126291	Kirtling Tower More images
Anglesey Abbey	Lode, East Cambridgeshire	Country House	Early 17th century	1 December 1951	TL5302162256; 52°14′14″N 0°14′22″E	1331433	Anglesey Abbey More images
Church of St Andrew	Soham, East Cambridgeshire	Church	c1180-1190	19 August 1959	TL5932873177; 52°20′01″N 0°20′13″E	1126450	Church of St Andrew More images
Church of St Andrew	Sutton, East Cambridgeshire	Parish Church	Late 14th century and early 15th century	5 February 1952	TL4483678977; 52°23′23″N 0°07′37″E	1331496	Church of St Andrew More images
The Burystead	Sutton, East Cambridgeshire	House	Medieval	5 February 1952	TL4331678933; 52°23′23″N 0°06′17″E	1126976	The Burystead More images
Church of St Mary the Virgin	Swaffham Bulbeck, East Cambridgeshire	Parish Church	13th century	19 August 1959	TL5552862248; 52°14′11″N 0°16′34″E	1127052	Church of St Mary the Virgin More images
The Abbey	Swaffham Bulbeck, East Cambridgeshire	House	Early 18th century	1 December 1951	TL5587663471; 52°14′50″N 0°16′55″E	1165597	The Abbey More images
Church of St Mary	Swaffham Prior, East Cambridgeshire	Parish Church	c. 1100	19 August 1959	TL5680063932; 52°15′04″N 0°17′44″E	1127040	Church of St Mary More images
Church of St Peter	Wilburton, East Cambridgeshire	Parish Church	13th century remains	5 February 1952	TL4797875000; 52°21′11″N 0°10′17″E	1302304	Church of St Peter More images
Church of St Martin	Witcham, East Cambridgeshire	Parish Church	13th century	5 February 1952	TL4649480045; 52°23′56″N 0°09′06″E	1163097	Church of St Martin More images
Parish Church of St Mary	Woodditton, East Cambridgeshire	Parish Church	Early 13th century	19 August 1959	TL6596859155; 52°12′20″N 0°25′39″E	1164545	Parish Church of St Mary More images

== Fenland ==
Name	Location	Type	Completed	Date designated	Grid ref. Geo-coordinates	Entry number	Image
Church of Saint Peter and Saint Paul	Chatteris, Fenland	Parish Church	14th century	5 July 1950	TL3946686082; 52°27′18″N 0°03′04″E	1126000	Church of Saint Peter and Saint Paul More images
Church of All Saints	Elm, Fenland	Parish Church	Early 13th century	23 June 1952	TF4698706880; 52°38′23″N 0°10′15″E	1331971	Church of All Saints More images
Church of St Leonard	Leverington, Fenland	Parish Church	Mid 13th century	23 June 1952	TF4448511403; 52°40′52″N 0°08′09″E	1160993	Church of St Leonard More images
Leverington Hall	Leverington, Fenland	House	c. 1630	23 June 1952	TF4456311262; 52°40′47″N 0°08′13″E	1125948	Leverington Hall More images
Church of St Wendreda	March, Fenland	Parish Church	Mid 14th century	13 March 1951	TL4151295211; 52°32′11″N 0°05′06″E	1287740	Church of St Wendreda More images
Bell Tower, South East of Church of St Giles	Tydd St Giles, Fenland	Bell Tower	Late 13th century	31 October 1983	TF4273316448; 52°43′37″N 0°06′44″E	1161163	Bell Tower, South East of Church of St Giles More images
Church of St Mary	Whittlesey, Fenland	Parish Church	13th century	11 August 1950	TL2699896959; 52°33′20″N 0°07′42″W	1228792	Church of St Mary More images
St Peter and St Paul's Church	Wisbech, Fenland	Church	Late 17th century	17 July 1951	TF4629609556; 52°39′50″N 0°09′43″E	1229992	St Peter and St Paul's Church More images
Peckover House	Wisbech, Fenland	House	1722	31 October 1983	TF4585809662; 52°39′54″N 0°09′19″E	1331632	Peckover House More images
14 North Brink	Wisbech, Fenland	House	Early 19th century	31 October 1983	TF4587709666; 52°39′54″N 0°09′20″E	1279112	Upload Photo

== Huntingdonshire ==
Name	Location	Type	Completed	Date designated	Grid ref. Geo-coordinates	Entry number	Image
Church of St Andrew	Abbots Ripton, Huntingdonshire	Parish Church	13th century	28 January 1958	TL2306178017; 52°23′11″N 0°11′36″W	1330505	Church of St Andrew More images
Church of Ss Peter and Paul	Alconbury, Huntingdonshire	Parish Church	13th century	28 January 1958	TL1845776120; 52°22′13″N 0°15′41″W	1330459	Church of Ss Peter and Paul More images
Parish Church of St Andrew	Alwalton, Huntingdonshire	Parish Church	c. 1190	13 December 1951	TL1335095943; 52°32′58″N 0°19′47″W	1330532	Parish Church of St Andrew More images
Parish Church of St Mary	Bluntisham, Huntingdonshire	Parish Church	14th century	30 May 1958	TL3724874456; 52°21′04″N 0°00′49″E	1128556	Parish Church of St Mary More images
Church of St Mary	Brampton, Huntingdonshire	Parish Church	13th century	28 January 1958	TL2148770716; 52°19′16″N 0°13′08″W	1330448	Church of St Mary More images
Pepys House	Brampton, Huntingdonshire	House	17th century	21 July 1951	TL2180770878; 52°19′21″N 0°12′51″W	1330472	Pepys House More images
Curtain Wall at Buckden Towers	Buckden, Huntingdonshire	Curtain Wall	Late 15th century	24 October 1951	TL1923467688; 52°17′40″N 0°15′11″W	1330444	Curtain Wall at Buckden Towers More images
Parish Church of St Mary	Buckden, Huntingdonshire	Parish Church	13th century	14 May 1959	TL1927067660; 52°17′39″N 0°15′09″W	1330416	Parish Church of St Mary More images
The Great Tower, Buckden Towers	Buckden, Huntingdonshire	Bishops Palace	1625–42	24 October 1951	TL1925267685; 52°17′40″N 0°15′10″W	1130324	The Great Tower, Buckden Towers More images
The Inner Gatehouse, Buckden Towers	Buckden, Huntingdonshire	House	15th century	24 October 1951	TL1921767714; 52°17′41″N 0°15′12″W	1130290	The Inner Gatehouse, Buckden Towers More images
Church of Holy Cross	Bury, Huntingdonshire	Parish Church	12th century	30 May 1958	TL2871783774; 52°26′12″N 0°06′29″W	1309536	Church of Holy Cross More images
Parish Church of St John the Baptist	Keyston, Bythorn and Keyston, Huntingdonshire	Parish Church	Mid 13th century	28 January 1958	TL0436675445; 52°22′02″N 0°28′07″W	1267649	Parish Church of St John the Baptist More images
Parish Church of St Leonards	Catworth, Huntingdonshire	Parish Church	13th century	14 May 1959	TL0887473365; 52°20′51″N 0°24′11″W	1214188	Parish Church of St Leonards More images
Parish Church of St Michael	Chesterton, Huntingdonshire	Parish Church	12th century	13 December 1957	TL1264895438; 52°32′43″N 0°20′25″W	1130089	Parish Church of St Michael More images
Church of All Saints	Conington, Huntingdonshire	Parish Church	Early 15th century	28 January 1958	TL1804085901; 52°27′30″N 0°15′51″W	1162630	Church of All Saints More images
Parish Church of St Peter	Easton, Huntingdonshire	Parish Church	Early 12th century	28 January 1958	TL1385671574; 52°19′50″N 0°19′50″W	1165141	Parish Church of St Peter More images
Parish Church of All Saints	Ellington, Huntingdonshire	Parish Church	13th century	28 January 1958	TL1602871782; 52°19′55″N 0°17′55″W	1165216	Parish Church of All Saints More images
Elton Hall	Elton, Huntingdonshire	Country House	1662–1689	25 September 1951	TL0882892960; 52°31′25″N 0°23′51″W	1164802	Elton Hall More images
Parish Church of St Peter and St Paul	Fenstanton, Huntingdonshire	Parish Church	Mid 13th century	30 May 1958	TL3201768743; 52°18′03″N 0°03′55″W	1330754	Parish Church of St Peter and St Paul More images
Parish Church of St Nicholas	Glatton, Huntingdonshire	Schoolroom	Early 19th century	13 December 1957	TL1536286108; 52°27′39″N 0°18′13″W	1215294	Parish Church of St Nicholas More images
Church of St Mary	Godmanchester, Huntingdonshire	Bell Tower	1625	28 November 1950	TL2454570716; 52°19′14″N 0°10′27″W	1128664	Church of St Mary More images
Huntingdon Bridge	Godmanchester, Huntingdonshire	Bridge	c. 1300	28 November 1950	TL2429271467; 52°19′38″N 0°10′39″W	1128636	Huntingdon Bridge More images
Church of All Saints	Grafham, Huntingdonshire	Parish Church	13th century or early 14th century	14 May 1959	TL1597269154; 52°18′30″N 0°18′01″W	1288615	Church of All Saints More images
Church of St Bartholomew	Great Gransden, Huntingdonshire	Parish Church	Late 14th century	14 May 1959	TL2709455616; 52°11′03″N 0°08′33″W	1290192	Church of St Bartholomew More images
Church of Holy Trinity	Great Paxton, Huntingdonshire	Church	c. 1050	14 May 1959	TL2099864173; 52°15′45″N 0°13′43″W	1330413	Church of Holy Trinity More images
Church of St Andrew	Great Staughton, Huntingdonshire	Church	14th century	14 May 1959	TL1240164686; 52°16′08″N 0°21′15″W	1214559	Church of St Andrew More images
Church of St Margaret	Hemingford Abbots, Huntingdonshire	Parish Church	13th century	30 May 1958	TL2827471178; 52°19′25″N 0°07′09″W	1162944	Church of St Margaret More images
Church of St James	Hemingford Grey, Huntingdonshire	Sundial	18th century	30 May 1958	TL2923970868; 52°19′15″N 0°06′19″W	1330773	Church of St James More images
The Manor House	Hemingford Grey, Huntingdonshire	First Floor Hall House	c. 1150	24 October 1951	TL2899170673; 52°19′08″N 0°06′32″W	1163135	The Manor House More images
Church of St Mary Magdalene	Hilton, Huntingdonshire	Church	Earlier	30 May 1958	TL2906966097; 52°16′40″N 0°06′34″W	1128440	Church of St Mary Magdalene More images
Parish Church of St John the Baptist	Holywell, Holywell-cum-Needingworth, Huntingdonshire	Parish Church	13th century	30 May 1958	TL3365870814; 52°19′09″N 0°02′26″W	1128422	Parish Church of St John the Baptist More images
Church of All Saints	Wyton, Houghton and Wyton, Huntingdonshire	Church	1958	30 May 1958	TL2778172224; 52°20′00″N 0°07′34″W	1330794	Church of All Saints More images
Church of All Saints	Huntingdon, Huntingdonshire	Parish Church	12th century or earlier	10 January 1951	TL2377571846; 52°19′51″N 0°11′06″W	1128592	Church of All Saints More images
Church of St Mary	Huntingdon, Huntingdonshire	Church	Norman	10 January 1951	TL2409671648; 52°19′44″N 0°10′49″W	1161910	Church of St Mary More images
Hinchingbrooke House	Huntingdon, Huntingdonshire	House	1538–1627	10 January 1951	TL2273971477; 52°19′40″N 0°12′01″W	1128649	Hinchingbrooke House More images
Gatehouse and Walls at Hinchingbrooke House	Huntingdon, Huntingdonshire	Gatehouse	16th century or earlier	27 May 1977	TL2274471535; 52°19′41″N 0°12′01″W	1128651	Upload Photo
Church of St Andrew	Kimbolton, Huntingdonshire	Parish Church	1086	14 May 1959	TL0993067862; 52°17′52″N 0°23′22″W	1210885	Church of St Andrew More images
Kimbolton School	Kimbolton Castle, Kimbolton, Huntingdonshire	House/School	16th century and 17th century	24 October 1951	TL1006867603; 52°17′44″N 0°23′15″W	1221022	Kimbolton School More images
Gatehouse to Kimbolton School	Kimbolton Castle, Kimbolton, Huntingdonshire	Pavilion	1764–66	24 October 1951	TL1000967670; 52°17′46″N 0°23′18″W	1221020	Gatehouse to Kimbolton School More images
Parish Church of St Mary	Leighton, Huntingdonshire	Parish Church	13th century	28 January 1958	TL1157175273; 52°21′51″N 0°21′46″W	1222905	Parish Church of St Mary More images
Parish Church of St John the Evangelist	Little Gidding, Huntingdonshire	Parish Church	Medieval	28 January 1958	TL1270481631; 52°25′16″N 0°20′39″W	1130115	Parish Church of St John the Evangelist More images
Parish Church of All Saints	Morborne, Huntingdonshire	Church	17th century	13 December 1957	TL1391991500; 52°30′34″N 0°19′22″W	1222032	Parish Church of All Saints More images
Church of St Peter	Offord D'Arcy, Offord Cluny and Offord D'Arcy, Huntingdonshire	Church	12th century	14 May 1959	TL2166766416; 52°16′57″N 0°13′04″W	1130249	Church of St Peter More images
Bodsey House	Ramsey, Huntingdonshire	House	16th century	1 May 1951	TL2952687334; 52°28′07″N 0°05′41″W	1166717	Upload Photo
Church of St Thomas à Becket of Canterbury	Ramsey, Huntingdonshire	Guest House	Circa 1180-90	1 May 1951	TL2907085148; 52°26′57″N 0°06′08″W	1157794	Church of St Thomas à Becket of Canterbury More images
Gatehouse to Ramsey Abbey	Ramsey, Huntingdonshire	Gate	Early 19th century	1 May 1951	TL2902585069; 52°26′54″N 0°06′11″W	1130258	Gatehouse to Ramsey Abbey More images
Ramsey Abbey School	Ramsey, Huntingdonshire	Country House	c. 1600	1 May 1951	TL2926985164; 52°26′57″N 0°05′57″W	1156544	Ramsey Abbey School More images
Chapel of St Ledger	Saint Ives, Huntingdonshire	Chapel	1930	24 March 1972	TL3127671153; 52°19′22″N 0°04′31″W	1161567	Chapel of St Ledger More images
Church of All Saints	Saint Ives, Huntingdonshire	Parish Church	12th century	29 September 1951	TL3098171568; 52°19′36″N 0°04′46″W	1128725	Church of All Saints More images
The Bridge	Saint Ives, Huntingdonshire	Bridge	1110	29 September 1951	TL3126671145; 52°19′22″N 0°04′32″W	1161421	The Bridge More images
Stibbington Hall	Stibbington, Sibson-cum-Stibbington, Huntingdonshire	Country House	1624	25 September 1951	TL0892498739; 52°34′32″N 0°23′39″W	1222241	Stibbington Hall More images
Gateway and Boundary Wall to Forecourt of Stibbington Hall	Stibbington, Sibson-cum-Stibbington, Huntingdonshire	Gate	c. 1625	13 December 1957	TL0890298726; 52°34′32″N 0°23′40″W	1274861	Gateway and Boundary Wall to Forecourt of Stibbington Hall
Wansford Bridge (to Cambridgeshire County Boundary)	Wansford, Sibson-cum-Stibbington, Huntingdonshire	Road Bridge	16th century	25 September 1951	TL0750599112; 52°34′45″N 0°24′54″W	1274654	Wansford Bridge (to Cambridgeshire County Boundary) More images
Church of St John the Baptist	Somersham, Huntingdonshire	Parish Church	13th century	30 May 1958	TL3601977861; 52°22′55″N 0°00′11″W	1330810	Church of St John the Baptist More images
Church of St Leonard	Southoe and Midloe, Huntingdonshire	Church	Late 12th century	14 May 1959	TL1829964442; 52°15′56″N 0°16′05″W	1130254	Church of St Leonard More images
Parish Church of St James	Spaldwick, Huntingdonshire	Parish Church	12th century	28 January 1958	TL1275872809; 52°20′30″N 0°20′47″W	1330478	Parish Church of St James More images
Church of St Mary	St Neots, Huntingdonshire	Church	Early 13th century	10 January 1971	TL1846260160; 52°13′37″N 0°16′01″W	1128002	Church of St Mary More images
Church of All Saints	Tilbrook, Huntingdonshire	Parish Church	Late 12th century	14 May 1959	TL0806069225; 52°18′38″N 0°24′59″W	1214784	Church of All Saints More images
Church of St Peter	Upwood, Upwood and the Raveleys, Huntingdonshire	Parish Church	c. 1100	28 January 1958	TL2594382687; 52°25′40″N 0°08′57″W	1130160	Church of St Peter More images
Church of St Mary Magdalene	Warboys, Huntingdonshire	Parish Church	12th century	30 May 1958	TL3026779863; 52°24′05″N 0°05′12″W	1128398	Church of St Mary Magdalene More images
Church of St John the Baptist	Wistow, Huntingdonshire	Church	18th century	30 May 1958	TL2786980976; 52°24′43″N 0°07′17″W	1128371	Church of St John the Baptist More images
Parish Church of St Peter	Yaxley, Huntingdonshire	Parish Church	13th century	13 December 1957	TL1770091842; 52°30′42″N 0°16′02″W	1274392	Parish Church of St Peter More images

== South Cambridgeshire ==
Name	Location	Type	Completed	Date designated	Grid ref. Geo-coordinates	Entry number	Image
Church of St Nicholas	Arrington, South Cambridgeshire	Parish Church	13th century	22 November 1967	TL3251650303; 52°08′07″N 0°03′55″W	1128196	Church of St Nicholas More images
Parish Church of St Peter South West of Babraham Hall	Babraham, South Cambridgeshire	Parish Church	c. 1200	22 November 1967	TL5095950529; 52°07′57″N 0°12′15″E	1331111	Parish Church of St Peter South West of Babraham Hall More images
Church of Holy Trinity	Balsham, South Cambridgeshire	Sculpture	Medieval	22 November 1967	TL5878650861; 52°08′00″N 0°19′07″E	1331425	Church of Holy Trinity More images
Church of All Saints	Barrington, South Cambridgeshire	Parish Church	Early 13th century	22 November 1967	TL3966449963; 52°07′49″N 0°02′20″E	1331176	Church of All Saints More images
Church of St Mary	Bartlow, South Cambridgeshire	Parish Church	12th century	22 November 1967	TL5859945184; 52°04′56″N 0°18′47″E	1318152	Church of St Mary More images
Parish Church of St Peter and St Paul	Bassingbourn cum Kneesworth, South Cambridgeshire	Parish Church	Early 13th century	22 November 1967	TL3306644073; 52°04′45″N 0°03′35″W	1330840	Parish Church of St Peter and St Paul More images
Bourn Mill	Bourn, South Cambridgeshire	Windmill	Early 17th century	31 August 1962	TL3118958004; 52°12′17″N 0°04′54″W	1162375	Bourn Mill More images
Parish Church of St Helen and St Mary	Bourn, South Cambridgeshire	Parish Church	12th century	31 August 1962	TL3244256371; 52°11′23″N 0°03′50″W	1309659	Parish Church of St Helen and St Mary More images
Church of St Mary	Comberton, South Cambridgeshire	Parish Church	Late 13th century	31 August 1962	TL3837655533; 52°10′51″N 0°01′21″E	1310174	Church of St Mary More images
Church of St Peter	Coton, South Cambridgeshire	Parish Church	12th century	31 August 1962	TL4088458887; 52°12′37″N 0°03′38″E	1127774	Church of St Peter More images
Church of All Saints	Cottenham, South Cambridgeshire	Parish Church	13th century	31 August 1962	TL4552168624; 52°17′47″N 0°07′57″E	1127339	Church of All Saints More images
Parish Church of St John	Duxford, South Cambridgeshire	Schoolroom	Mid 17th century	22 November 1967	TL4781346197; 52°05′40″N 0°09′23″E	1330953	Parish Church of St John More images
Parish Church of St Peter	Duxford, South Cambridgeshire	Parish Church	12th century	22 November 1967	TL4806045982; 52°05′33″N 0°09′35″E	1162738	Parish Church of St Peter More images
Parish Church of Holy Trinity	Elsworth, South Cambridgeshire	Parish Church	13th century	31 August 1962	TL3185463578; 52°15′16″N 0°04′11″W	1127266	Parish Church of Holy Trinity More images
Parish Church of St Mary	Fowlmere, South Cambridgeshire	Parish Church	Early 12th century	22 November 1967	TL4225045932; 52°05′36″N 0°04′30″E	1128096	Parish Church of St Mary More images
Church of St Lawrence	Foxton, Cambridgeshire	Parish Church	late C12/early 13th century	22 November 1967	TL4121148335; 52°06′55″N 0°03′39″E	1162382	Church of St Lawrence More images
Church of St Mary the Virgin	Gamlingay, South Cambridgeshire	Parish Church	13th century	22 November 1967	TL2411552293; 52°09′18″N 0°11′14″W	1330908	Church of St Mary the Virgin More images
Church of St Mary	Great Shelford, South Cambridgeshire	Parish Church	12th century	31 August 1962	TL4587251872; 52°08′45″N 0°07′50″E	1127895	Church of St Mary More images
Odsey House	Guilden Morden, South Cambridgeshire	Country House	c. 1723	4 September 1986	TL2953038053; 52°01′33″N 0°06′49″W	1330874	Upload Photo
Parish Church of St Mary	Guilden Morden, South Cambridgeshire	Parish Church	12th century	22 November 1967	TL2798044137; 52°04′51″N 0°08′02″W	1330865	Parish Church of St Mary More images
Church of St Mary	Harlton, South Cambridgeshire	Parish Church	Late 14th century	31 August 1962	TL3871952529; 52°09′13″N 0°01′34″E	1127751	Church of St Mary More images
Church of All Saints	Haslingfield, South Cambridgeshire	Parish Church	12th century	31 August 1962	TL4037352135; 52°08′59″N 0°03′01″E	1331124	Church of All Saints More images
Church of St Edmund	Hauxton, South Cambridgeshire	Parish Church	Early 12th century	31 August 1962	TL4359652172; 52°08′57″N 0°05′50″E	1164672	Church of St Edmund More images
Parish Church of Holy Trinity	Hildersham, South Cambridgeshire	Parish Church	c. 1200	22 November 1967	TL5453548834; 52°06′58″N 0°15′20″E	1127726	Parish Church of Holy Trinity More images
St Andrew's, Histon	Histon, South Cambridgeshire	Parish Church	13th century	31 August 1962	TL43616399; 52°15′19″N 0°06′09″E	1127404	St Andrew's, Histon More images
Church of St Peter	Horningsea, South Cambridgeshire	Church	Early 12th century	31 August 1962	TL4928462647; 52°14′30″N 0°11′06″E	1331295	Church of St Peter More images
Church of All Saints	Horseheath, South Cambridgeshire	Parish Church	14th century	22 November 1967	TL6137547447; 52°06′07″N 0°21′17″E	1127944	Church of All Saints More images
Parish Church of St Mary Magdalen	Ickleton, South Cambridgeshire	Parish Church	Late 11th century	22 November 1967	TL4947443858; 52°04′23″N 0°10′46″E	1128057	Parish Church of St Mary Magdalen More images
Church of St Andrew	Impington, South Cambridgeshire	Parish Church	Early 13th century	31 August 1962	TL4478663218; 52°14′53″N 0°07′10″E	1178832	Church of St Andrew More images
Impington Village College	Impington, South Cambridgeshire	Assembly Hall	1938–9	28 January 1971	TL4462263170; 52°14′52″N 0°07′01″E	1331296	Impington Village College More images
Church of All Saints and St Andrew	Kingston, Cambridgeshire	Parish Church	13th century	22 November 1967	TL3461355430; 52°10′51″N 0°01′57″W	1127592	Church of All Saints and St Andrew More images
Parish Church of All Saints	Landbeach, South Cambridgeshire	Parish Church	13th century	31 August 1962	TL4765865358; 52°16′00″N 0°09′45″E	1127385	Parish Church of All Saints More images
Parish Church of St Mary the Virgin	Linton, South Cambridgeshire	Church	mediaeval and later	22 November 1967	TL5618746676; 52°05′47″N 0°16′43″E	1162094	Parish Church of St Mary the Virgin More images
Church of All Saints	Longstanton, South Cambridgeshire	Parish Church	Mid-late 14th century	31 August 1962	TL3989966417; 52°16′41″N 0°02′57″E	1127295	Church of All Saints More images
Madingley Hall and stable courtyard	Madingley, South Cambridgeshire	Country House	Mid and late 16th century	31 August 1962	TL3926460469; 52°13′29″N 0°02′15″E	1163528	Madingley Hall and stable courtyard More images
Church of Holy Trinity	Meldreth, South Cambridgeshire	Parish Church	Mid 12th century	22 November 1967	TL3777746837; 52°06′10″N 0°00′37″E	1127558	Church of Holy Trinity More images
Church of St Andrew	Orwell, Cambridgeshire	Parish Church	12th century	22 November 1967	TL3622350474; 52°08′09″N 0°00′40″W	1317573	Church of St Andrew More images
Church of St Mary	Over, South Cambridgeshire	Parish Church	13th century	31 August 1962	TL3724770778; 52°19′05″N 0°00′44″E	1317811	Church of St Mary More images
Manor House	Papworth St Agnes, South Cambridgeshire	Cross Wing House	c. 1585	31 August 1962	TL2679664731; 52°15′58″N 0°08′36″W	1127243	Upload Photo
Parish Church of St Mary	Sawston, South Cambridgeshire	Parish Church	c. 1180	22 November 1967	TL4876149236; 52°07′17″N 0°10′17″E	1128065	Parish Church of St Mary More images
Sawston Hall	Sawston, South Cambridgeshire	Country House	Late Medieval	12 February 1958	TL4884049112; 52°07′13″N 0°10′21″E	1330979	Sawston Hall More images
Parish Church of St Andrew	Swavesey, South Cambridgeshire	Church	11th century	31 August 1962	TL3627169382; 52°18′20″N 0°00′10″W	1226375	Parish Church of St Andrew More images
The Old Manor House	Swavesey, South Cambridgeshire	Double Ended Hall House	Late Medieval	31 August 1962	TL3636569334; 52°18′19″N 0°00′05″W	1226398	Upload Photo
Denny Abbey	Waterbeach, South Cambridgeshire	Abbey	c. 1150	31 August 1962	TL4922168404; 52°17′37″N 0°11′12″E	1127360	Denny Abbey More images
Denny Abbey Refectory	Waterbeach, South Cambridgeshire	Franciscan Nunnery	c. 1340	31 August 1962	TL4923368460; 52°17′38″N 0°11′13″E	1331328	Denny Abbey Refectory More images
Parish Church of St Mary	Whaddon, South Cambridgeshire	Parish Church	Early 13th century	22 November 1967	TL3495746587; 52°06′04″N 0°01′52″W	1164317	Parish Church of St Mary More images
Parish Church of St Mary and St Andrew	Whittlesford, South Cambridgeshire	Parish Church	12th century	22 November 1967	TL4737748577; 52°06′57″N 0°09′04″E	1128014	Parish Church of St Mary and St Andrew More images
Church of St Mary and All the Saints	Willingham, South Cambridgeshire	Parish Church	Early 14th century	31 August 1962	TL4047670501; 52°18′53″N 0°03′34″E	1127283	Church of St Mary and All the Saints More images
Wimpole Hall	Wimpole, South Cambridgeshire	Country House	17th century	22 November 1967	TL3355250994; 52°08′28″N 0°02′59″W	1128166	Wimpole Hall More images

== See also ==
- Grade II* listed buildings in Cambridgeshire
