= Listed buildings in Cambridge (centre, western part) =

Non-Civil Parish in Cambridgeshire, England

Cambridge is a city and non-metropolitan district in the county of Cambridgeshire, England It contains 838 listed buildings that are recorded in the National Heritage List for England. Of these 67 are grade I, 54 are grade II* and 717 are grade II.

This list is based on the information retrieved online from Historic England. The quantity of listed buildings in Cambridge requires subdivision into geographically defined lists. This list includes all listed buildings located in western part of the city center.

== Key ==
| Grade | Criteria |
|---|---|
| I | Buildings that are of exceptional interest |
| II* | Particularly important buildings of more than special interest |
| II | Buildings that are of special interest |

== Listing ==
=== Centre, western part ===
| Name | Grade | Location | Type | Completed (Note: The date given is the date used by Historic England as significant for the initial building or that of an important part in the structure's description.) | Date designated | Grid ref. (Note: The grid reference is based on the British national grid reference system, sometimes known as OSGB36, used by the Ordnance Survey.) Geo-coordinates | Notes | Entry number (Note: The "List Entry Number" is a unique number assigned to each listed building and scheduled monument by Historic England.) | Image | Wikidata |
|---|---|---|---|---|---|---|---|---|---|---|
| Lichfield House | II | 1, All Saints Passage | | | 2 November 1972 | TL4485158725; 52°12′28″N 0°07′06″E | | 1126243 | Upload Photo | Q26419218 |
| 2, All Saints Passage | II | 2, All Saints Passage | | | 2 November 1972 | TL4486558716; 52°12′27″N 0°07′07″E | | 1331834 | Upload Photo | Q26616699 |
| 4, All Saints Passage | II | 4, All Saints Passage | | | 2 November 1972 | TL4487658726; 52°12′28″N 0°07′08″E | | 1126244 | Upload Photo | Q26419219 |
| 5-7, All Saints Paasage | II | 5-7, All Saints Paasage | | | 2 November 1972 | TL4488558735; 52°12′28″N 0°07′08″E | | 1331835 | Upload Photo | Q26616700 |
| Stanley House | II | 2, Bene't Street | | | 2 November 1972 | TL4487458327; 52°12′15″N 0°07′07″E | | 1126247 | Upload Photo | Q26419222 |
| Bath Hotel | II | 3, Bene't Street | pub | | 2 November 1972 | TL4486358322; 52°12′15″N 0°07′06″E | | 1331837 | Bath Hotel More images | Q26616702 |
| Entrance to Number 4a | II | 4, Bene't Street | | | 2 November 1972 | TL4485458318; 52°12′15″N 0°07′06″E | | 1126248 | Upload Photo | Q26419223 |
| 5, Bene't Street | II | 5, Bene't Street | | | 26 April 1950 | TL4484858314; 52°12′14″N 0°07′06″E | | 1126249 | Upload Photo | Q26419224 |
| 6 and 8, Bene't Street | II | 6 and 8, Bene't Street | | | 26 April 1950 | TL4484058309; 52°12′14″N 0°07′05″E | | 1338200 | Upload Photo | Q26622546 |
| Three Richardson Candle Wall-mounted Lamps Attached to the North Side of Bene't Street. | II | 6 and 8, Bene't Street | | | 4 April 2013 | TL4487958326; 52°12′15″N 0°07′07″E | | 1414076 | Upload Photo | Q66477633 |
| The Eagle Inn | II | 7, Bene't Street | pub | | 26 April 1950 | TL4482958325; 52°12′15″N 0°07′05″E | | 1126250 | The Eagle Inn More images | Q7731334 |
| 9, Bene't Street | II | 9, Bene't Street | | | 29 March 1962 | TL4482258300; 52°12′14″N 0°07′04″E | | 1126251 | Upload Photo | Q26419226 |
| Former National Westminster Bank | II | 10, Bene't Street | | | 18 May 1967 | TL4481858276; 52°12′13″N 0°07′04″E | | 1122620 | Upload Photo | Q26415742 |
| Culpeper House | II | 13, Bene't Street | | | 2 November 1972 | TL4486458307; 52°12′14″N 0°07′06″E | | 1126254 | Upload Photo | Q26419228 |
| Barclay's Bank | II | 16, Bene't Street | | | 2 November 1972 | TL4489858314; 52°12′14″N 0°07′08″E | | 1126255 | Upload Photo | Q26419229 |
| Arts School | II | Bene't Street, CB2 3QN | | | 2 November 1972 | TL4491358292; 52°12′14″N 0°07′09″E | | 1121119 | Upload Photo | Q26414301 |
| Church of St Bene't | I | Bene't Street | church building | | 26 April 1950 | TL4485558278; 52°12′13″N 0°07′06″E | | 1126252 | Church of St Bene't More images | Q128404 |
| Churchyard Railings and Gates of St Benet's | II | Bene't Street | | | 2 November 1972 | TL4484558297; 52°12′14″N 0°07′05″E | | 1122624 | Upload Photo | Q26415746 |
| 1, 1a and 1b, Botolph Lane | II | 1, 1a and 1b, Botolph Lane | | | 2 November 1972 | TL4484558113; 52°12′08″N 0°07′05″E | | 1126256 | Upload Photo | Q26419230 |
| 2 and 3, Botolph Lane | II | 2 and 3, Botolph Lane | | | 2 November 1972 | TL4485658117; 52°12′08″N 0°07′06″E | | 1122628 | Upload Photo | Q26415750 |
| 4, Botolph Lane | II | 4, Botolph Lane | | | 2 November 1972 | TL4486458119; 52°12′08″N 0°07′06″E | | 1331838 | Upload Photo | Q26616703 |
| 5, 6, 7 and 7a, Botolph Lane | II | 5, 6, 7 and 7a, Botolph Lane | | | 2 November 1972 | TL4487358122; 52°12′08″N 0°07′07″E | | 1122633 | Upload Photo | Q26415754 |
| 8-11, Botolph Lane | II | 8-11, Botolph Lane | | | 2 November 1972 | TL4488858128; 52°12′08″N 0°07′07″E | | 1126257 | Upload Photo | Q26419231 |
| 12 and 13, Botolph Lane | II | 12 and 13, Botolph Lane | | | 2 November 1972 | TL4490258133; 52°12′09″N 0°07′08″E | | 1331839 | Upload Photo | Q26616704 |
| 14-16, Botolph Lane | II | 14-16, Botolph Lane | | | 2 November 1972 | TL4491458136; 52°12′09″N 0°07′09″E | | 1122004 | Upload Photo | Q26415135 |
| Botolph House | II | 17, Botolph Lane | | | 26 April 1950 | TL4492458141; 52°12′09″N 0°07′09″E | | 1126258 | Upload Photo | Q26419232 |
| Church of St Botolph | I | Botolph Lane | church building | | 26 April 1950 | TL4484358142; 52°12′09″N 0°07′05″E | | 1331905 | Church of St Botolph More images | Q17527486 |
| The Red Cow Public House | II | Corn Exchange Street | restaurant | | 30 June 1993 | TL4496058374; 52°12′16″N 0°07′12″E | | 1265272 | The Red Cow Public House More images | Q26555879 |
| Zoological Laboratory | II | Downing Street, New Museum Site | university building | | 18 May 1967 | TL4504158208; 52°12′11″N 0°07′16″E | | 1323018 | Zoological Laboratory More images | Q5025476 |
| Friar House | II | 1, 2 and 2a, Free School Lane | | | 29 March 1962 | TL4486458302; 52°12′14″N 0°07′06″E | | 1126253 | Upload Photo | Q26419227 |
| 3, Free School Lane | II | 3, Free School Lane | | | 26 April 1950 | TL4486958295; 52°12′14″N 0°07′07″E | | 1126217 | Upload Photo | Q26419192 |
| Cavendish Laboratory of Experimental Physics | II | Free School Lane, New Museum Site | | | 26 April 1950 | TL4488658266; 52°12′13″N 0°07′08″E | | 1331808 | Upload Photo | Q26616677 |
| Laboratory of Physical Chemistry | II | Free School Lane, New Museum Site | | | 26 April 1950 | TL4492158195; 52°12′11″N 0°07′09″E | | 1126278 | Upload Photo | Q26419247 |
| The Mill the Mill Bridge and Paved Surround | II | Granta Place | bridge | | 2 November 1972 | TL4469558020; 52°12′05″N 0°06′57″E | | 1081507 | The Mill the Mill Bridge and Paved Surround More images | Q26356951 |
| 1 and 2, Green Street | II | 1 and 2, Green Street | | | 2 November 1972 | TL4494258641; 52°12′25″N 0°07′11″E | | 1126221 | Upload Photo | Q26419196 |
| 3-7, Green Street | II | 3-7, Green Street | | | 2 November 1972 | TL4492958632; 52°12′25″N 0°07′10″E | | 1099221 | Upload Photo | Q26391374 |
| 10, Green Street | II | 10, Green Street | | | 2 November 1972 | TL4490958621; 52°12′24″N 0°07′09″E | | 1331823 | Upload Photo | Q26616691 |
| The Whim | II | 22, Green Street | | | 2 November 1972 | TL4485858578; 52°12′23″N 0°07′07″E | | 1099230 | Upload Photo | Q26391384 |
| 23, Green Street | II | 23, Green Street | | | 2 November 1972 | TL4486458578; 52°12′23″N 0°07′07″E | | 1126222 | Upload Photo | Q26419197 |
| 24, Green Street | II | 24, Green Street | | | 2 November 1972 | TL4486958580; 52°12′23″N 0°07′07″E | | 1331824 | Upload Photo | Q26616692 |
| 25, Green Street | II | 25, Green Street | | | 2 November 1972 | TL4487758582; 52°12′23″N 0°07′08″E | | 1349027 | Upload Photo | Q26632350 |
| 26 and 27, Green Street | II | 26 and 27, Green Street | | | 2 November 1972 | TL4488558587; 52°12′23″N 0°07′08″E | | 1126223 | Upload Photo | Q26419198 |
| Fisher House | II | Guildhall Street | | | 29 March 1962 | TL4496958388; 52°12′17″N 0°07′12″E | | 1331825 | Upload Photo | Q26616693 |
| 1, King's Parade | II | 1, King's Parade | | | 2 November 1972 | TL4481558297; 52°12′14″N 0°07′04″E | | 1126171 | Upload Photo | Q26419149 |
| 2, King's Parade | II | 2, King's Parade | | | 26 April 1950 | TL4481658306; 52°12′14″N 0°07′04″E | | 1331878 | Upload Photo | Q26616737 |
| 3, King's Parade | II | 3, King's Parade | | | 2 November 1972 | TL4481558314; 52°12′15″N 0°07′04″E | | 1126172 | Upload Photo | Q26419150 |
| 4, 4a and 5, King's Parade | II | 4, 4a and 5, King's Parade | | | 26 April 1950 | TL4481558326; 52°12′15″N 0°07′04″E | | 1126173 | Upload Photo | Q26419151 |
| 6 and 6a, King's Parade | II | 6 and 6a, King's Parade | | | 26 April 1950 | TL4481658333; 52°12′15″N 0°07′04″E | | 1331879 | Upload Photo | Q26616738 |
| 7 and 8, King's Parade | II | 7 and 8, King's Parade | | | 26 April 1950 | TL4481858340; 52°12′15″N 0°07′04″E | | 1126174 | Upload Photo | Q26419152 |
| 9, King's Parade | II | 9, King's Parade | | | 26 April 1950 | TL4481858347; 52°12′16″N 0°07′04″E | | 1331880 | Upload Photo | Q26616739 |
| 10 and 11, King's Parade | II | 10 and 11, King's Parade | | | 26 April 1950 | TL4481858354; 52°12′16″N 0°07′04″E | | 1126175 | Upload Photo | Q26419153 |
| 12 and 12a, King's Parade | II | 12 and 12a, King's Parade | | | 26 April 1950 | TL4481858364; 52°12′16″N 0°07′04″E | | 1126176 | Upload Photo | Q26419154 |
| 13, King's Parade | II | 13, King's Parade | | | 10 May 1962 | TL4482358376; 52°12′17″N 0°07′04″E | | 1099908 | Upload Photo | Q26392016 |
| 14, King's Parade | II | 14, King's Parade | | | 26 April 1950 | TL4482458382; 52°12′17″N 0°07′04″E | | 1331881 | Upload Photo | Q26616740 |
| 15, King's Parade | II | 15, King's Parade | | | 10 May 1962 | TL4482458387; 52°12′17″N 0°07′04″E | | 1126177 | Upload Photo | Q26419155 |
| 16, King's Parade | II | 16, King's Parade | | | 29 March 1962 | TL4482458392; 52°12′17″N 0°07′04″E | | 1348510 | Upload Photo | Q26631886 |
| 17, King's Parade | II | 17, King's Parade | | | 29 March 1962 | TL4482458399; 52°12′17″N 0°07′04″E | | 1331843 | Upload Photo | Q26616708 |
| 18-21, King's Parade | II | 18-21, King's Parade | | | 10 May 1962 | TL4482658411; 52°12′18″N 0°07′05″E | | 1126178 | Upload Photo | Q26419156 |
| 22, King's Parade | II | 22, King's Parade | | | 29 March 1962 | TL4482758423; 52°12′18″N 0°07′05″E | | 1100341 | Upload Photo | Q26392475 |
| Letter Box at King's College Gate | II | King's Parade | Penfold pillar box | | 2 November 1972 | TL4478658350; 52°12′16″N 0°07′02″E | | 1331844 | Letter Box at King's College Gate More images | Q26616709 |
| Five Wall-mounted Richardson Candles in Kings Parade | II | 6, 11, 15 and 20, Kings Parade | | | 6 May 2011 | TL4481258362; 52°12′16″N 0°07′04″E | | 1400899 | Upload Photo | Q26675450 |
| 15, 15a, 15b and 16, Magdalene Street | II* | 15, 15a, 15b and 16, Magdalene Street | building | | 26 April 1950 | TL4461759027; 52°12′38″N 0°06′55″E | | 1347915 | 15, 15a, 15b and 16, Magdalene Street More images | Q17543389 |
| 17 and 18, Magdalene Street | II | 17 and 18, Magdalene Street | | | 2 November 1972 | TL4462659019; 52°12′38″N 0°06′55″E | | 1126158 | Upload Photo | Q26419136 |
| 20, Magdalene Street | II | 20, Magdalene Street | | | 29 March 1962 | TL4463859010; 52°12′37″N 0°06′56″E | | 1101513 | Upload Photo | Q26395015 |
| 21 and 22, Magdalene Street | II | 21 and 22, Magdalene Street | | | 29 March 1962 | TL4464359006; 52°12′37″N 0°06′56″E | | 1331874 | Upload Photo | Q26616734 |
| 23, Magdalene Street | II | 23, Magdalene Street | | | 29 March 1962 | TL4465258998; 52°12′37″N 0°06′56″E | | 1126159 | Upload Photo | Q26419137 |
| 24, Magdalene Street | II | 24, Magdalene Street | | | 29 March 1962 | TL4465658994; 52°12′37″N 0°06′57″E | | 1347908 | Upload Photo | Q26631329 |
| Post Office | II | 25, Magdalene Street | | | 26 April 1950 | TL4466458990; 52°12′37″N 0°06′57″E | | 1331875 | Upload Photo | Q26616735 |
| Magdalene College, Benson Court | II* | 25a, Magdalene Street, Magdalene College | architectural structure | | 2 November 1972 | TL4465358983; 52°12′36″N 0°06′56″E | | 1332186 | Magdalene College, Benson Court More images | Q17543378 |
| 26-28, Magdalene Street | II | 26-28, Magdalene Street | | | 23 March 1962 | TL4467058983; 52°12′36″N 0°06′57″E | | 1101458 | Upload Photo | Q26394903 |
| 29, Magdalene Street | II | 29, Magdalene Street | | | 23 March 1962 | TL4468158972; 52°12′36″N 0°06′58″E | | 1126160 | Upload Photo | Q26419138 |
| The Pickerel Inn | II | 30, Magdalene Street | inn | | 23 March 1962 | TL4469058963; 52°12′36″N 0°06′58″E | | 1101465 | The Pickerel Inn More images | Q26394918 |
| 31, Magdalene Street | II | 31, Magdalene Street | | | 26 April 1950 | TL4469858956; 52°12′35″N 0°06′59″E | | 1126161 | Upload Photo | Q26419139 |
| 4, Market Hill | II | 4, Market Hill | | | 2 November 1972 | TL4493858462; 52°12′19″N 0°07′11″E | | 1126133 | Upload Photo | Q26419114 |
| 5, Market Hill | I | 5, Market Hill | building | | 26 April 1950 | TL4493758471; 52°12′19″N 0°07′11″E | | 1331862 | 5, Market Hill More images | Q17527473 |
| 12, Market Hill | II | 12, Market Hill | | | 2 November 1972 | TL4492558507; 52°12′21″N 0°07′10″E | | 1126134 | Upload Photo | Q26419115 |
| 15, Market Hill | II | 15, Market Hill | | | 25 October 1989 | TL4490258515; 52°12′21″N 0°07′09″E | | 1265292 | Upload Photo | Q26555898 |
| 27 and 28, Market Hill | II | 27 and 28, Market Hill | | | 2 November 1972 | TL4484958489; 52°12′20″N 0°07′06″E | | 1343684 | Upload Photo | Q26627465 |
| Church of St Mary the Great | I | Market Hill | church building | | 26 April 1950 | TL4484658460; 52°12′19″N 0°07′06″E | | 1126084 | Church of St Mary the Great More images | Q3585454 |
| Fountain in the Centre of Market Hill | II | Market Hill | | | 2 November 1972 | TL4490158464; 52°12′19″N 0°07′09″E | | 1101735 | Upload Photo | Q26395483 |
| Guildhall | II | Market Place | guild house | | 2 August 1996 | TL4491358414; 52°12′18″N 0°07′09″E | | 1268372 | Guildhall More images | Q5025431 |
| Market Place Paving and Two Sets of Iron Railings | II | | | | 30 October 2019 | TL4490258468; 52°12′19″N 0°07′09″E | | 1467164 | Upload Photo | Q96484248 |
| 1, Market Street | II | 1, Market Street | | | 2 November 1972 | TL4499558564; 52°12′22″N 0°07′14″E | | 1126135 | Upload Photo | Q26419116 |
| 2, Market Street | II | 2, Market Street | | | 2 November 1972 | TL4498858561; 52°12′22″N 0°07′13″E | | 1331863 | Upload Photo | Q26616725 |
| 19,20 and 21, Market Street | II | 19, 20 and 21, Market Street | | | 2 August 1996 | TL4493158513; 52°12′21″N 0°07′10″E | | 1268373 | Upload Photo | Q26558682 |
| Church of the Holy Trinity | II* | Market Street | parish church | | 26 April 1950 | TL4498458527; 52°12′21″N 0°07′13″E | | 1331864 | Church of the Holy Trinity More images | Q5886471 |
| Henry Martyn Hall | II | Market Street | | | 18 May 1967 | TL4496358523; 52°12′21″N 0°07′12″E | | 1126136 | Upload Photo | Q26419117 |
| Railings and Gates at the Church of the Holy Trinity | II | Market Street | | | 2 November 1972 | TL4499558542; 52°12′22″N 0°07′14″E | | 1126137 | Upload Photo | Q26419118 |
| 1, Mill Lane | II | 1, Mill Lane | | | 2 November 1972 | TL4483558068; 52°12′07″N 0°07′05″E | | 1235124 | Upload Photo | Q26528478 |
| Mill Haven, East House | II | 12, Mill Lane | architectural structure | | 26 April 1950 | TL4474258031; 52°12′05″N 0°07′00″E | | 1235125 | Mill Haven, East House More images | Q26528479 |
| Mill Haven, West House | II | 12, Mill Lane | architectural structure | | 2 November 1972 | TL4473058031; 52°12′05″N 0°06′59″E | | 1235126 | Mill Haven, West House More images | Q26528480 |
| The Mill Public House | II | 13 and 14, Mill Lane | pub | | 2 November 1972 | TL4471658025; 52°12′05″N 0°06′58″E | | 1126140 | The Mill Public House More images | Q26419121 |
| Mond Laboratory | II | New Museum Site | | | 2 August 1996 | TL4492158239; 52°12′12″N 0°07′09″E | | 1268374 | Upload Photo | Q26558683 |
| 1, Northampton Street | II* | 1, Northampton Street | | | 26 April 1950 | TL4460959035; 52°12′38″N 0°06′54″E | | 1331873 | Upload Photo | Q17543339 |
| Cory House | II* | 2-6, Northampton Street | house | | 26 April 1950 | TL4459359034; 52°12′38″N 0°06′53″E | | 1126151 | Cory House More images | Q17543286 |
| 7-18, Northampton Street | II | 7-18, Northampton Street | | | 2 November 1972 | TL4455759021; 52°12′38″N 0°06′51″E | | 1084322 | Upload Photo | Q26367958 |
| 19, Northampton Street | II | 19, Northampton Street | | | 2 November 1972 | TL4452259020; 52°12′38″N 0°06′50″E | | 1331869 | Upload Photo | Q26616730 |
| 21-24, Northampton Street | II | 21-24, Northampton Street | | | 2 November 1972 | TL4451159008; 52°12′37″N 0°06′49″E | | 1331892 | Upload Photo | Q26616751 |
| The Merton Arms Public House | II | 25, Northampton Street | | | 2 November 1972 | TL4449659002; 52°12′37″N 0°06′48″E | | 1126112 | Upload Photo | Q26419094 |
| 26-30, Northampton Street | II | 26-30, Northampton Street | | | 2 November 1972 | TL4446958990; 52°12′37″N 0°06′47″E | | 1126113 | Upload Photo | Q26419095 |
| 32-38, Northampton Street | II | 32-38, Northampton Street | | | 2 November 1972 | TL4441258959; 52°12′36″N 0°06′44″E | | 1331894 | Upload Photo | Q26616752 |
| Merton Hall | II* | Northampton Street | | | 26 April 1950 | TL4448258949; 52°12′35″N 0°06′47″E | | 1331893 | Upload Photo | Q17543343 |
| School of Pythagoras | I | Northampton Street | school building | | 26 April 1950 | TL4449858944; 52°12′35″N 0°06′48″E | | 1126114 | School of Pythagoras More images | Q4525039 |
| 3, Parsons Court | II | 3, Parsons Court, CB2 3QE | | | 2 November 1972 | TL4493658340; 52°12′15″N 0°07′10″E | | 1331899 | Upload Photo | Q26616757 |
| Church of St Edward, King and Martyr | II* | Peas Hill | church building | | 26 April 1950 | TL4486958386; 52°12′17″N 0°07′07″E | | 1126076 | Church of St Edward, King and Martyr More images | Q7593020 |
| 4 and 5, Peas Hill | II | 4 and 5, Peas Hill | | | 29 March 1962 | TL4488258352; 52°12′16″N 0°07′07″E | | 1126130 | Upload Photo | Q26419111 |
| Arts Theatre | II | 6, Peas Hill | theatre building | | 29 March 1962 | TL4488458346; 52°12′15″N 0°07′08″E | | 1331900 | Arts Theatre More images | Q5025355 |
| 7, Peas Hill | II | 7, Peas Hill | | | 29 March 1962 | TL4488558338; 52°12′15″N 0°07′08″E | | 1068562 | Upload Photo | Q26321267 |
| 10, Peas Hill | II | 10, Peas Hill | | | 2 November 1972 | TL4491058334; 52°12′15″N 0°07′09″E | | 1126131 | Upload Photo | Q26419112 |
| 11, Peas Hill | II | 11, Peas Hill | | | 2 November 1972 | TL4491758337; 52°12′15″N 0°07′09″E | | 1068572 | Upload Photo | Q26321277 |
| 3, Pembroke Street | II | 3, Pembroke Street | | | 2 November 1972 | TL4486058098; 52°12′07″N 0°07′06″E | | 1126132 | Upload Photo | Q26419113 |
| 4, Pembroke Street | II | 4, Pembroke Street | | | 2 November 1972 | TL4486658102; 52°12′08″N 0°07′06″E | | 1331901 | Upload Photo | Q26616759 |
| 5, Pembroke Street | II | 5, Pembroke Street | | | 2 November 1972 | TL4487358106; 52°12′08″N 0°07′07″E | | 1126093 | Upload Photo | Q26419075 |
| 6-12, Pembroke Street | II | 6-12, Pembroke Street | | | 2 November 1972 | TL4490058119; 52°12′08″N 0°07′08″E | | 1331885 | Upload Photo | Q26616744 |
| 32-33, Petty Cury | II | 32-33, Petty Cury | | | 2 November 1972 | TL4497258448; 52°12′19″N 0°07′12″E | | 1126095 | Upload Photo | Q26419077 |
| Garden Wall at Merton House | II | Queens Road | | | 2 November 1972 | TL4437658939; 52°12′35″N 0°06′42″E | | 1068625 | Upload Photo | Q26321326 |
| Merton Cottage | II | Queens Road | | | 2 November 1972 | TL4437658898; 52°12′34″N 0°06′42″E | | 1126104 | Upload Photo | Q26419085 |
| Merton House | II | Queens Road | | | 2 November 1972 | TL4440058927; 52°12′35″N 0°06′43″E | | 1331886 | Upload Photo | Q26616745 |
| 1-11, Rose Crescent | II | 1-11, Rose Crescent | | | 2 November 1972 | TL4488858552; 52°12′22″N 0°07′08″E | | 1356165 | Upload Photo | Q26638859 |
| 1, Silver Street and 71-72 Trumpington Street | II | 1, Silver Street, 71-72 Trumpington Street, CB3 9EL | building | | 14 February 2022 | TL4480858138; 52°12′09″N 0°07′03″E | | 1477397 | 1, Silver Street and 71-72 Trumpington Street More images | Q111853466 |
| 2 and 3 Silver Street | II | 2 and 3, Silver Street, CB3 9EL | | | 2 November 1972 | TL4479658131; 52°12′09″N 0°07′03″E | | 1068803 | Upload Photo | Q26321496 |
| 4 Silver Street | II | 4, Silver Street, CB3 9EL | | | 2 November 1972 | TL4478458126; 52°12′08″N 0°07′02″E | | 1126089 | Upload Photo | Q26419072 |
| Telephone Kiosks Outside Pitt Building | II | Silver Street | | | 11 February 1988 | TL4480858121; 52°12′08″N 0°07′03″E | | 1126035 | Upload Photo | Q26419021 |
| Three Richardson Candle Wall-mounted Lamps Attached to the North Side of the Mill Lane Site on Silver Street. | II | Silver Street | | | 4 April 2013 | TL4475658108; 52°12′08″N 0°07′00″E | | 1414071 | Upload Photo | Q26676390 |
| Richardson Candle Street Lamp on the South-east Corner of Silver Street | II | Silver Street | | | 4 April 2013 | TL4480858124; 52°12′08″N 0°07′03″E | | 1414074 | Upload Photo | Q26676391 |
| Silver Street Bridge | II | | road bridge | | 24 April 2013 | TL4465958055; 52°12′07″N 0°06′55″E | | 1409450 | Silver Street Bridge More images | Q26676095 |
| 3 and 4, St Edward's Passage | II | 3 and 4, St Edward's Passage | | | 2 November 1972 | TL4486258368; 52°12′16″N 0°07′06″E | | 1126077 | Upload Photo | Q26419061 |
| 8, St Edward's Passage | II | 8, St Edward's Passage | | | 2 November 1972 | TL4484158368; 52°12′16″N 0°07′05″E | | 1126078 | Upload Photo | Q26419062 |
| 9, St Edward's Passage | II | 9, St Edward's Passage | | | 2 November 1972 | TL4483858369; 52°12′16″N 0°07′05″E | | 1126079 | Upload Photo | Q26419063 |
| 10, St Edward's Passage | II | 10, St Edward's Passage | | | 2 November 1972 | TL4483158367; 52°12′16″N 0°07′05″E | | 1126080 | Upload Photo | Q26419064 |
| 12-15, St Edward's Passage | II | 12-15, St Edward's Passage | | | 2 November 1972 | TL4484358390; 52°12′17″N 0°07′05″E | | 1126081 | Upload Photo | Q26419065 |
| 15a and 16, St Edward's Passage | II | 15a and 16, St Edward's Passage | | | 2 November 1972 | TL4484958407; 52°12′17″N 0°07′06″E | | 1331916 | Upload Photo | Q26616772 |
| 1, St Mary's Passage | II | 1, St Mary's Passage | | | 2 November 1972 | TL4483758421; 52°12′18″N 0°07′05″E | | 1126085 | Upload Photo | Q26419068 |
| 3, St Mary's Passage | II | 3, St Mary's Passage, CB2 3PQ | | | 4 August 2020 | TL4484858424; 52°12′18″N 0°07′06″E | | 1469340 | Upload Photo | Q98175669 |
| Fence and Gates at the Church of St Mary the Great | II | St Mary's Passage | | | 2 November 1972 | TL4484258437; 52°12′18″N 0°07′05″E | | 1068763 | Upload Photo | Q26321458 |
| Four K6 Telephone Kiosks Adjacent to Church of St Mary the Great | II | St Mary Street, CB2 3PQ | | | 11 February 1988 | TL4486758476; 52°12′20″N 0°07′07″E | | 1126034 | Upload Photo | Q26419020 |
| Richardson Candle Group in St Johns Street and North Trinity Street, and One Wall-mounted Lamp Attached To The School Of Divinity | II | No.s 14-16 St John's Street, Outside All Saints Garden | | | 6 May 2011 | TL4485258791; 52°12′30″N 0°07′07″E | | 1400850 | Upload Photo | Q26675441 |
| The Cockerell Building (squire Law Library) | I | The Old Schools | law library | | 26 April 1950 | TL4473058480; 52°12′20″N 0°07′00″E | | 1121518 | The Cockerell Building (squire Law Library) More images | Q17527303 |
| 2 Lamp Posts in Senate House Passage at the Entrance to the Old Schools | II | The Old Schools | | | 2 November 1972 | TL4476058488; 52°12′20″N 0°07′01″E | | 1331809 | Upload Photo | Q26616678 |
| Railings and Gates Round the Senate House | I | The Old Schools | | | 26 April 1950 | TL4480958467; 52°12′19″N 0°07′04″E | | 1126280 | Upload Photo | Q26263435 |
| The Law School and University Offices | I | The Old Schools | university building | | 26 April 1950 | TL4473058432; 52°12′18″N 0°07′00″E | | 1126279 | The Law School and University Offices More images | Q17527413 |
| The Senate House | I | The Old Schools | university building | | 26 April 1950 | TL4478658482; 52°12′20″N 0°07′03″E | | 1322818 | The Senate House More images | Q3478506 |
| Urn on Senate House Lawn | II | The Old Schools | | | 26 April 1950 | TL4478658455; 52°12′19″N 0°07′03″E | | 1122675 | Upload Photo | Q26415792 |
| 1, Trinity Street | II | 1, Trinity Street | | | 26 April 1950 | TL4483658486; 52°12′20″N 0°07′05″E | | 1331906 | Upload Photo | Q26616763 |
| 26, St Mary's Street (see Details for Further Address Information) | II | 2, Trinity Street | | | 2 November 1972 | TL4483558492; 52°12′20″N 0°07′05″E | | 1126060 | Upload Photo | Q26419047 |
| 3, Trinity Street | II | 3, Trinity Street | | | 2 November 1972 | TL4483458500; 52°12′21″N 0°07′05″E | | 1331907 | Upload Photo | Q26616764 |
| 4,5 and 6, Trinity Street | II | 4, 5 and 6, Trinity Street | | | 2 August 1996 | TL4483858513; 52°12′21″N 0°07′05″E | | 1268349 | Upload Photo | Q26558663 |
| 9, Trinity Street | II | 9, Trinity Street | | | 2 November 1972 | TL4484558570; 52°12′23″N 0°07′06″E | | 1331908 | Upload Photo | Q26616765 |
| 10, Trinity Street | II | 10, Trinity Street | | | 2 November 1972 | TL4484858577; 52°12′23″N 0°07′06″E | | 1126062 | Upload Photo | Q26419048 |
| 13, Trinity Street | II* | 13, Trinity Street | | | 26 April 1950 | TL4485158593; 52°12′24″N 0°07′06″E | | 1126063 | Upload Photo | Q17543263 |
| 14, Trinity Street | II* | 14, Trinity Street | | | 26 April 1950 | TL4485158602; 52°12′24″N 0°07′06″E | | 1331909 | Upload Photo | Q17543355 |
| 15, Trinity Street | II | 15, Trinity Street | | | 26 April 1950 | TL4485258609; 52°12′24″N 0°07′06″E | | 1126064 | Upload Photo | Q26419049 |
| 16 and 16a, Trinity Street | II | 16 and 16a, Trinity Street | | | 2 November 1972 | TL4485158617; 52°12′24″N 0°07′06″E | | 1331910 | Upload Photo | Q26616766 |
| Blue Boar Hotel | II | 17, Trinity Street | | | 2 November 1972 | TL4484858626; 52°12′25″N 0°07′06″E | | 1075166 | Upload Photo | Q26338012 |
| 19, Trinity Street | II | 19, Trinity Street | | | 2 November 1972 | TL4484558634; 52°12′25″N 0°07′06″E | | 1126065 | Upload Photo | Q26419050 |
| 20 and 21, Trinity Street | II | 20 and 21, Trinity Street | | | 26 April 1950 | TL4484158647; 52°12′25″N 0°07′06″E | | 1126066 | Upload Photo | Q26419051 |
| 26 Trinity Street | II | 26, Trinity Street, CB2 1TB | | | 2 November 1972 | TL4481958641; 52°12′25″N 0°07′05″E | | 1126067 | Upload Photo | Q26419052 |
| 27 and 28, Trinity Street | II | 27 and 28, Trinity Street | | | 2 November 1972 | TL4482958626; 52°12′25″N 0°07′05″E | | 1356541 | Upload Photo | Q26639188 |
| 29, Trinity Street | II | 29, Trinity Street | | | 2 November 1972 | TL4483058617; 52°12′24″N 0°07′05″E | | 1331912 | Upload Photo | Q26616768 |
| 30 and 31, Trinity Street | II* | 30 and 31, Trinity Street | building | | 26 April 1950 | TL4483158609; 52°12′24″N 0°07′05″E | | 1126068 | 30 and 31, Trinity Street More images | Q17543267 |
| 32, Trinity Street | II | 32, Trinity Street | | | 2 November 1972 | TL4483258600; 52°12′24″N 0°07′05″E | | 1356545 | Upload Photo | Q26639191 |
| 33 and 34, Trinity Street | II | 33 and 34, Trinity Street | | | 2 November 1972 | TL4483158590; 52°12′23″N 0°07′05″E | | 1126069 | Upload Photo | Q26419053 |
| 35-37, Trinity Street | II | 35-37, Trinity Street | | | 2 November 1972 | TL4482958577; 52°12′23″N 0°07′05″E | | 1331913 | Upload Photo | Q26616769 |
| 38, Trinity Street | II | 38, Trinity Street | | | 2 November 1972 | TL4482658567; 52°12′23″N 0°07′05″E | | 1067801 | Upload Photo | Q26320596 |
| Richardson Candle Wall Mounted Lamps Attached to 16, 19, 24, 27, 35 and 38 Trinity Street | II | Trinity Street | | | 6 May 2011 | TL4483358656; 52°12′26″N 0°07′05″E | | 1400890 | Upload Photo | Q26675448 |
| Church of St Michael | I | Trinity Street | church building | | 26 April 1950 | TL4484858534; 52°12′22″N 0°07′06″E | | 1126061 | Church of St Michael More images | Q17527392 |
| Cross in the Churchyard of the Destroyed Church of All Saints | II | Trinity Street | | | 2 November 1972 | TL4483758699; 52°12′27″N 0°07′06″E | | 1342869 | Upload Photo | Q26626798 |
| Railings Round Churchyard of the Destroyed Church of All Saints | II | Trinity Street | | | 26 April 1950 | TL4484458688; 52°12′27″N 0°07′06″E | | 1331911 | Upload Photo | Q26616767 |
| Cambridge University Press (pitt Press) University Press | II | Trumpington Street | building | | 26 April 1950 | TL4482058098; 52°12′08″N 0°07′04″E | | 1126282 | Cambridge University Press (pitt Press) University Press More images | Q26419248 |
| Wall and Fence of the Churchyard of the Church of St Botolph | II | Trumpington Street | | | 2 November 1972 | TL4483158128; 52°12′08″N 0°07′04″E | | 1126050 | Upload Photo | Q26419037 |
| 51, Trumpington Street and 2 Pembroke Street with Wall-mounted Richardson Candle | II | 51, Trumpington Street, 2 Pembroke Street, CB2 1RG | | | 2 November 1972 | TL4484858092; 52°12′07″N 0°07′05″E | | 1076984 | Upload Photo | Q26343036 |
| 52, Trumpington Street | II | 52, Trumpington Street | | | 2 November 1972 | TL4484458097; 52°12′07″N 0°07′05″E | | 1331904 | Upload Photo | Q26616762 |
| 53, Trumpington Street | II | 53, Trumpington Street | | | 2 November 1972 | TL4484358103; 52°12′08″N 0°07′05″E | | 1126049 | Upload Photo | Q26419036 |
| 54, Trumpington Street | II | 54, Trumpington Street | | | 2 November 1972 | TL4484058109; 52°12′08″N 0°07′05″E | | 1342715 | Upload Photo | Q26626659 |
| 70 Trumpington Street | II | 70, Trumpington Street | | | 17 October 2011 | TL4479958144; 52°12′09″N 0°07′03″E | | 1402090 | Upload Photo | Q26675525 |
| 1 and 2, Wheeler Street (see Details for Further Address Information) | II | 1 and 2, Wheeler Street | | | 2 November 1972 | TL4492758344; 52°12′15″N 0°07′10″E | | 1331931 | Upload Photo | Q26616784 |
| Corn Exchange | II | Wheeler Street | sports venue | | 18 May 1967 | TL4495558342; 52°12′15″N 0°07′11″E | | 1126025 | Corn Exchange More images | Q5025399 |
| Public Library | II | Wheeler Street | | | 18 May 1967 | TL4491858368; 52°12′16″N 0°07′09″E | | 1331932 | Upload Photo | Q26616785 |
| Two Richardson Candle Wall-mounted Lamps Attached to the Old Guildhall on Wheeler Street. | II | Wheeler Street | | | 4 April 2013 | TL4492158357; 52°12′16″N 0°07′10″E | | 1414075 | Upload Photo | Q26676392 |

=== Clare College ===
| Name | Grade | Location | Type | Completed | Date designated | Grid ref. Geo-coordinates | Notes | Entry number | Image | Wikidata |
|---|---|---|---|---|---|---|---|---|---|---|
| Clare College, Clare Bridge | I | Clare Bridge, Clare College | footbridge | | 26 April 1950 | TL4455758413; 52°12′18″N 0°06′50″E | | 1125549 | Clare College, Clare Bridge More images | Q17527374 |
| Clare College Memorial Court | II* | Clare College | building | | 10 May 1962 | TL4430158417; 52°12′18″N 0°06′37″E | | 1115639 | Clare College Memorial Court More images | Q17543228 |
| Clare College, Gates and Railings to Trinity Hall Lane | I | Clare College | architectural structure | | 26 April 1950 | TL4469158430; 52°12′18″N 0°06′58″E | | 1125550 | Clare College, Gates and Railings to Trinity Hall Lane More images | Q17527381 |
| Clare College, Gateway on West Side of Clare Bridge with Flanking Railings and Gates to College Garden | I | Clare College | architectural structure | | 26 April 1950 | TL4454358411; 52°12′18″N 0°06′50″E | | 1125551 | Clare College, Gateway on West Side of Clare Bridge with Flanking Railings and Gates to College Garden More images | Q17527386 |
| Clare College, Gateway to Clare Hall Piece | II* | Clare College | charitable organization | | 26 April 1950 | TL4443158397; 52°12′18″N 0°06′44″E | | 1332170 | Clare College, Gateway to Clare Hall Piece More images | Q760967 |
| Clare College, Gateway to the University Library | II | Clare College | | | 2 November 1972 | TL4421358413; 52°12′18″N 0°06′32″E | | 1320358 | Upload Photo | Q26606363 |
| Falling Warrior Sculpture in Clare College Memorial Court | II | Queens Road | | | 15 April 1998 | TL4428158401; 52°12′18″N 0°06′36″E | | 1031585 | Upload Photo | Q19758927 |
| Clare College, Railings Gates and Brick Plinth Walls on Either Side of the Causeway Between the College West Gate and the Bridge | II | Clare College | | | 26 April 1950 | TL4458958419; 52°12′18″N 0°06′52″E | | 1115662 | Upload Photo | Q26409361 |
| Clare College, Screen and Gates Fronting Queen's Road | II | Queens Road, Clare College | | | 2 November 1972 | TL4436458420; 52°12′18″N 0°06′40″E | | 1125552 | Upload Photo | Q26418541 |
| Clare College, the Buildings Surrounding the Fore and Principal Courts | I | Clare College | architectural structure | | 26 April 1950 | TL4466558427; 52°12′18″N 0°06′56″E | | 1320280 | Clare College, the Buildings Surrounding the Fore and Principal Courts More images | Q17527431 |
| Clare College, Wall on North Side of Master's Garden | II | Clare College | | | 26 April 1950 | TL4458658447; 52°12′19″N 0°06′52″E | | 1115646 | Upload Photo | Q26409345 |
| Clare College, Wall on South Side of Fellows' Garden | II | Clare College | | | 26 April 1950 | TL4459258392; 52°12′17″N 0°06′52″E | | 1332169 | Upload Photo | Q26617006 |
| Clare College | II | Clare College | | | 1 1985 | TL4445158441; 52°12′19″N 0°06′45″E | | 1000617 | Upload Photo | |

=== Corpus Christi College ===
| Name | Grade | Location | Type | Completed | Date designated | Grid ref. Geo-coordinates | Notes | Entry number | Image | Wikidata |
|---|---|---|---|---|---|---|---|---|---|---|
| Corpus Christi College, Four Lamp Standards in New Court | II | Corpus Christi College | | | 2 November 1972 | TL4483358192; 52°12′11″N 0°07′05″E | | 1320374 | Upload Photo | Q26606377 |
| Corpus Christi College, New Buildings | II | 55-59, Trumpington Street, Corpus Christi College | | | 18 May 1967 | TL4481558247; 52°12′12″N 0°07′04″E | | 1332171 | Upload Photo | Q26617007 |
| Richardson Candle Group at St Catharine's College and Northern Trumpington Street, and Five Richardson Candle Lamp-posts Outside No.s 39 and 56, St Botolph's Church, Pembroke College Old Court and Master's Lodge and Two Outside Corpus Christi College | II | Trumpington Street | | | 6 May 2011 | TL4480958239; 52°12′12″N 0°07′03″E | | 1400909 | Upload Photo | Q26675452 |
| Corpus Christi College, the Buildings Surrounding the Old and New Courts Including the Master's Lodge | I | Corpus Christi College | college of the University of Cambridge | | 26 April 1950 | TL4485258220; 52°12′11″N 0°07′06″E | | 1125553 | Corpus Christi College, the Buildings Surrounding the Old and New Courts Including the Master's Lodge More images | Q536282 |

=== Darwin College ===
| Name | Grade | Location | Type | Completed | Date designated | Grid ref. Geo-coordinates | Notes | Entry number | Image | Wikidata |
|---|---|---|---|---|---|---|---|---|---|---|
| Newnham Grange, Darwin College | II | Silver Street, CB3 9EU | | | 2 November 1972 | TL4456757950; 52°12′03″N 0°06′50″E | | 1115533 | Upload Photo | Q15262174 |
| The Hermitage, Darwin College | II | Silver Street, CB3 9EU | | | 2 November 1972 | TL4453257924; 52°12′02″N 0°06′48″E | | 1320391 | Upload Photo | Q26606393 |
| Darwin College, the Old Granary | II | Silver Street | architectural structure | | 2 November 1972 | TL4461457982; 52°12′04″N 0°06′53″E | | 1332172 | Darwin College, the Old Granary More images | Q26617008 |
| Dining Hall, Darwin College | II | Silver Street, CB3 9EU | | | 8 June 2023 | TL4452857903; 52°12′01″N 0°06′48″E | | 1466370 | Upload Photo | Q122213486 |
| Rayne Building, Darwin College | II | Silver Street, CB3 9EU | | | 8 June 2023 | TL4455557940; 52°12′03″N 0°06′50″E | | 1485694 | Upload Photo | Q122214115 |

=== Gonville and Caius College ===
| Name | Grade | Location | Type | Completed | Date designated | Grid ref. Geo-coordinates | Notes | Entry number | Image | Wikidata |
|---|---|---|---|---|---|---|---|---|---|---|
| Harvey Court, Gonville and Caius College | II* | West Road | university dormitory | | 30 March 1993 | TL4432658137; 52°12′09″N 0°06′38″E | | 1126009 | Harvey Court, Gonville and Caius College More images | Q77063697 |
| Gonville and Caius College, J Staircase of St Michaels Court | II | Gonville And Caius College | | | 2 November 1972 | TL4484658501; 52°12′21″N 0°07′06″E | | 1332159 | Upload Photo | Q26616997 |
| Gonville and Caius College, Lecture Rooms | II* | Gonville And Caius College | | | 2 November 1972 | TL4473058495; 52°12′20″N 0°07′00″E | | 1332158 | Upload Photo | Q17543370 |
| Market Hill Buildings (St Michael's Court), Gonville and Caius College | II | 16-21, Market Hill | | | 18 May 1994 | TL4487558503; 52°12′21″N 0°07′07″E | | 1200398 | Upload Photo | Q26496202 |
| Gonville and Caius College, North and East Ranges of St Michaels Court, Staircases A-F St Michael's Court | II | Gonville And Caius College | | | 2 November 1972 | TL4487458547; 52°12′22″N 0°07′07″E | | 1125528 | Upload Photo | Q26418526 |
| Richardson Candle Group in Trinity Street Including Gonville and Caius College | II | Senate House Hill, and Michaelhouse, Trinity Street, and Wall-mounted Lamp Attached to Nos. 1 and 6 Trinity Street | | | 6 May 2011 | TL4483458540; 52°12′22″N 0°07′05″E | | 1400896 | Upload Photo | Q26675449 |
| Gonville and Caius College, the Buildings Surrounding Gonville Court and Caius Court Including the Hall, Chapel, Master's Lodge and Gate of Virtue, But Excluding the Gate of Honour | I | Gonville And Caius College | architectural structure | | 26 April 1950 | TL4476358534; 52°12′22″N 0°07′01″E | | 1320425 | Gonville and Caius College, the Buildings Surrounding Gonville Court and Caius Court Including the Hall, Chapel, Master's Lodge and Gate of Virtue, But Excluding the Gate of Honour More images | Q17527439 |
| Gonville and Caius College, the Gate of Honour and Flanking Walls | I | Gonville And Caius College | architectural structure | | 26 April 1950 | TL4475958494; 52°12′20″N 0°07′01″E | | 1125526 | Gonville and Caius College, the Gate of Honour and Flanking Walls More images | Q17527343 |
| Gonville and Caius College, the Gate of Humility | I | Gonville And Caius College | architectural structure | | 26 April 1950 | TL4474058500; 52°12′21″N 0°07′00″E | | 1125527 | Gonville and Caius College, the Gate of Humility More images | Q17527349 |
| Gonville and Caius College, the North and East Ranges of Tree Court and South Wall | II* | Gonville And Caius College | architectural structure | | 18 May 1967 | TL4482258534; 52°12′22″N 0°07′05″E | | 1115408 | Gonville and Caius College, the North and East Ranges of Tree Court and South Wall More images | Q17543218 |
| Gonville and Caius College, Wall of Master's Garden Fronting Trinity Hall Lane | II | Wall Of Master's Garden Fronting Trinity Hall Lane, Gonville And Caius College | | | 2 November 1972 | TL4471558514; 52°12′21″N 0°06′59″E | | 1115153 | Upload Photo | Q26408901 |

=== King's College ===
| Name | Grade | Location | Type | Completed | Date designated | Grid ref. Geo-coordinates | Notes | Entry number | Image | Wikidata |
|---|---|---|---|---|---|---|---|---|---|---|
| King's College, Bodley's Buildings | II | King's College | | | 18 May 1967 | TL4462458233; 52°12′12″N 0°06′54″E | | 1125534 | Upload Photo | Q26418530 |
| King's College, Chapel | I | Kings College | chapel | | 26 April 1950 | TL4472858395; 52°12′17″N 0°06′59″E | | 1139003 | King's College, Chapel More images | Q1263246 |
| King's College, Fellows' Building | I | Kings College | building | | 26 April 1950 | TL4469258333; 52°12′15″N 0°06′57″E | | 1125533 | King's College, Fellows' Building More images | Q17527359 |
| King's College, Fountain in the Centre of First Court | II | Kings College | | | 2 November 1972 | TL4473658340; 52°12′15″N 0°07′00″E | | 1318932 | Upload Photo | Q26605040 |
| King's College, Gateway to Queen's Road | II* | Kings College | | | 2 November 1972 | TL4443458234; 52°12′12″N 0°06′44″E | | 1318911 | Upload Photo | Q77056868 |
| King's College, King's Bridge | I | King's College | footbridge | | 26 April 1950 | TL4456758278; 52°12′14″N 0°06′51″E | | 1125535 | King's College, King's Bridge More images | Q17527362 |
| King's College, Railings Between the North East Turret of the Chapel and the East Range of the Schools | II | Kings College | | | 2 November 1972 | TL4477558421; 52°12′18″N 0°07′02″E | | 1318933 | Upload Photo | Q26605041 |
| King's College, Scott's Building | II | Kings College | | | 18 May 1967 | TL4478458278; 52°12′13″N 0°07′02″E | | 1145818 | Upload Photo | Q26438959 |
| King's College, Screens and Entrance Gateway on King's Parade | I | Kings College | architectural structure | | 26 April 1950 | TL4478058346; 52°12′16″N 0°07′02″E | | 1125532 | King's College, Screens and Entrance Gateway on King's Parade More images | Q17527355 |
| King's College, South Range of First Court, Including the Library and the Former Provost's Lodge | I | Kings College | | | 26 April 1950 | TL4474358287; 52°12′14″N 0°07′00″E | | 1139452 | Upload Photo | Q17527425 |
| King's College, South Range of Webb's Court with Gateway to Queen's Lane | II | Kings College | | | 2 November 1972 | TL4470958249; 52°12′13″N 0°06′58″E | | 1332163 | Upload Photo | Q26617001 |
| King's College, Twelve Lamposts in First Court | II | Kings College | | | 2 November 1972 | TL4474458377; 52°12′17″N 0°07′00″E | | 1332162 | Upload Photo | Q26617000 |

=== Magdalene College ===
| Name | Grade | Location | Type | Completed | Date designated | Grid ref. Geo-coordinates | Notes | Entry number | Image | Wikidata |
|---|---|---|---|---|---|---|---|---|---|---|
| Magdalene College, Benson Court Main Block | II | Magdalene College | | | 18 May 1967 | TL4463558941; 52°12′35″N 0°06′55″E | | 1125505 | Upload Photo | Q26418511 |
| Magdalene College, Boundary Wall of College Fronting Magdalene Street and Chesterton Lane | II | Magdalene College | | | 2 November 1972 | TL4464559091; 52°12′40″N 0°06′56″E | | 1125503 | Upload Photo | Q26418509 |
| Magdalene College, Bright's Building | II | Magdalene College | | | 18 May 1967 | TL4474159020; 52°12′37″N 0°07′01″E | | 1125502 | Upload Photo | Q26418508 |
| Magdalene College, Mallory Court | II | 18a, Magdalene Street, Magdalene College | | | 2 November 1972 | TL4462059006; 52°12′37″N 0°06′55″E | | 1125504 | Upload Photo | Q26418510 |
| Magdalene College, Mallory Court, North West Range | II* | Magdalene College | | | 2 November 1972 | TL4457958994; 52°12′37″N 0°06′52″E | | 1332185 | Upload Photo | Q99512459 |
| Magdalene College, Pepys Building | I | Magdalene College | library | | 26 April 1950 | TL4473459055; 52°12′39″N 0°07′01″E | | 1332183 | Magdalene College, Pepys Building More images | Q5042665 |
| Magdalene College, Railings, Gate Piers and Gates to Garden on Magdalene Street | II | Magdalene College | | | 26 April 1950 | TL4470058974; 52°12′36″N 0°06′59″E | | 1332184 | Upload Photo | Q26617017 |
| Magdalene College, the Buildings Surrounding First Court | I | Magdalene College | architectural structure | | 26 April 1950 | TL4468258992; 52°12′37″N 0°06′58″E | | 1125500 | Magdalene College, the Buildings Surrounding First Court More images | Q17527326 |
| Magdalene College, Walls Lining the Second Court on North East and South West Sides | II | Magdalene College | | | 26 April 1950 | TL4471159052; 52°12′38″N 0°07′00″E | | 1125501 | Upload Photo | Q26418507 |

=== Queen's College ===
| Name | Grade | Location | Type | Completed | Date designated | Grid ref. Geo-coordinates | Notes | Entry number | Image | Wikidata |
|---|---|---|---|---|---|---|---|---|---|---|
| Queens' College, Mathematical Bridge | II | Queens College | truss bridge | | 26 April 1950 | TL4463758105; 52°12′08″N 0°06′54″E | | 1125515 | Queens' College, Mathematical Bridge More images | Q2980588 |
| Queens' College, North and East Walls of the President's Garden | II | Queens College | | | 2 November 1972 | TL4464858171; 52°12′10″N 0°06′55″E | | 1125516 | Upload Photo | Q26418517 |
| Queens' College, North Boundary Wall of the Fellows' Fruit Garden | II | Queens College | | | 2 November 1972 | TL4456558130; 52°12′09″N 0°06′50″E | | 1332212 | Upload Photo | Q26617039 |
| Queens' College, North Wall of the Fellows' Garden | II | Queens College | | | 2 November 1972 | TL4463258224; 52°12′12″N 0°06′54″E | | 1326651 | Upload Photo | Q26612121 |
| Three Richardson Candle Wall-mounted Lamps Attached to the South Side of Queens' College, Silver Street. | II | Silver Street | | | 4 April 2013 | TL4466458081; 52°12′08″N 0°06′57″E | | 1414066 | Upload Photo | Q66477632 |
| Queens' College, the Buildings Surrounding Front Court, Cloister Court, Pump Court and Walnut Tree Court | I | Queens College | college of the University of Cambridge | | 26 April 1950 | TL4471558145; 52°12′09″N 0°06′58″E | | 1087041 | Queens' College, the Buildings Surrounding Front Court, Cloister Court, Pump Court and Walnut Tree Court More images | Q765642 |

=== St Catherine's College ===
| Name | Grade | Location | Type | Completed | Date designated | Grid ref. Geo-coordinates | Notes | Entry number | Image | Wikidata |
|---|---|---|---|---|---|---|---|---|---|---|
| The Railings, Piers, Gateway and Screen Wall on the East Side of Principal Court, St Catharines College | I | St Catherines College | wall | | 26 April 1950 | TL4478658198; 52°12′11″N 0°07′02″E | | 1332213 | The Railings, Piers, Gateway and Screen Wall on the East Side of Principal Court, St Catharines College More images | Q123991811 |
| Boundary Wall Fronting Queen's Lane, St Catharine's College | II | St Catherines College | | | 2 November 1972 | TL4472758149; 52°12′09″N 0°06′59″E | | 1125483 | Upload Photo | Q26418494 |
| Bull Hostel, St Catharine's College | II | St Catherines College | hotel | | 26 April 1950 | TL4479158238; 52°12′12″N 0°07′02″E | | 1332215 | Bull Hostel, St Catharine's College More images | Q7720551 |
| Screen and Gates of Master's Lodge Fronting Queen's Lane, St Catharine's College | II | St Catherines College | | | 2 November 1972 | TL4473158125; 52°12′08″N 0°06′59″E | | 1125482 | Upload Photo | Q26418493 |
| The Buildings Surrounding Principal Court, St Catharine's College | I | St Catherines College | building complex | | 26 April 1950 | TL4472658183; 52°12′10″N 0°06′59″E | | 1125480 | The Buildings Surrounding Principal Court, St Catharine's College More images | Q17527306 |
| Two Lamp Posts at the Main Entrance to the College, St Catharine's College | II | St Catherines College | | | 2 November 1972 | TL4480158202; 52°12′11″N 0°07′03″E | | 1125481 | Upload Photo | Q26418492 |
| Master's Lodge, St Catharines College | II | Silver Street, St Catherines College | | | 2 November 1972 | TL4475858129; 52°12′09″N 0°07′01″E | | 1332214 | Upload Photo | Q26617040 |
| St Catharine's College | II | 68, Trumpington Street, | | | 2 November 1972 | TL4480358164; 52°12′10″N 0°07′03″E | | 1125484 | Upload Photo | Q26418495 |

=== St John's College ===
| Name | Grade | Location | Type | Completed | Date designated | Grid ref. Geo-coordinates | Notes | Entry number | Image | Wikidata |
|---|---|---|---|---|---|---|---|---|---|---|
| St John's College, Boundary Wall on Queen's Road Between the Field Gate and Bin Brook | II | St John's College | | | 2 November 1972 | TL4435158802; 52°12′31″N 0°06′40″E | | 1332181 | Upload Photo | Q26617015 |
| Cripps Building at St John's College | II* | St John's College | building | | 31 March 2009 | TL4463658891; 52°12′33″N 0°06′55″E | | 1393223 | Cripps Building at St John's College More images | Q17543396 |
| St Johns' College, Bridge Over Bin Brook Between Trinity and St John's Backs | II | St Johns College | | | 2 November 1972 | TL4455358689; 52°12′27″N 0°06′51″E | | 1105681 | Upload Photo | Q26399615 |
| St John's College, Field Gate | II | St Johns College | | | 26 April 1950 | TL4436058825; 52°12′31″N 0°06′41″E | | 1125490 | Upload Photo | Q26418498 |
| St John's College, Four Gates Onto the Wilderness and the Scholars' Garden, North East Gate, North West Gate, South East Gate and South West Gate | II | St Johns College | | | 2 November 1972 | TL4445558796; 52°12′30″N 0°06′46″E | | 1105683 | Upload Photo | Q26399616 |
| St John's College, Gates of Chapel Court Yard Onto St John's Street | II | St John's College | | | 2 November 1972 | TL4483258793; 52°12′30″N 0°07′05″E | | 1332952 | Upload Photo | Q26617733 |
| St John's College, Gate to Trinity Piece South East of the Wilderness | II* | St Johns College | | | 2 November 1972 | TL4442058647; 52°12′26″N 0°06′44″E | | 1125491 | Upload Photo | Q122853462 |
| St John's College, Gateway and Piers Adjoining the Old Bridge | I | St Johns College | gate | | 26 April 1950 | TL4467058753; 52°12′29″N 0°06′57″E | | 1125489 | St John's College, Gateway and Piers Adjoining the Old Bridge More images | Q17527320 |
| St John's College, Gateway to Kitchen Yard to East of Old Bridge | I | St Johns College | | | 26 April 1950 | TL4468958747; 52°12′29″N 0°06′58″E | | 1125488 | Upload Photo | Q17527315 |
| St John's College, Gateway to St John's Street to South of the College Buildings | I | St Johns College | | | 26 April 1950 | TL4480158700; 52°12′27″N 0°07′04″E | | 1332179 | Upload Photo | Q17527499 |
| St John's College, High Walk Bridge Over Bin Brook | II | St Johns College | | | 2 November 1972 | TL4447758799; 52°12′31″N 0°06′47″E | | 1332180 | Upload Photo | Q26617014 |
| St John's College, Master's Lodge | II | Bridge Street, St Johns College | | | 18 May 1967 | TL4472658878; 52°12′33″N 0°07′00″E | | 1104837 | Upload Photo | Q26398803 |
| St John's College, New Bridge | I | St Johns College | footbridge | | 26 April 1950 | TL4466658797; 52°12′30″N 0°06′57″E | | 1326664 | St John's College, New Bridge More images | Q3397409 |
| St John's College, New Court | I | New Court, St Johns College | architectural structure | | 26 April 1950 | TL4461458836; 52°12′32″N 0°06′54″E | | 1332178 | St John's College, New Court More images | Q17527494 |
| St John's College, Old Bridge | I | Old Bridge, St Johns College | footbridge | | 26 April 1950 | TL4465958756; 52°12′29″N 0°06′56″E | | 1125486 | St John's College, Old Bridge More images | Q17527312 |
| St John's College, Screen Between the Chapel and the East Range of First Court | II | St Johns College | | | 2 November 1972 | TL4481558763; 52°12′29″N 0°07′05″E | | 1125485 | Upload Photo | Q26418496 |
| K6 Outside the Masters Lodge, St John's College | II | St John's College, Bridge Street | | | 14 March 2014 | TL4476658896; 52°12′33″N 0°07′02″E | | 1416696 | Upload Photo | Q26676533 |
| 11, St John's Street | II | 11, St John's Street | | | 2 November 1972 | TL4483658758; 52°12′29″N 0°07′06″E | | 1331917 | Upload Photo | Q26616773 |
| 12, St John's Street | II | 12, St John's Street | | | 2 November 1972 | TL4484058764; 52°12′29″N 0°07′06″E | | 1126083 | Upload Photo | Q26419067 |
| 13, St John's Street | II | 13, St John's Street | | | 2 November 1972 | TL4484258769; 52°12′29″N 0°07′06″E | | 1356125 | Upload Photo | Q26638820 |
| 14 and 15, St John's Street | II | 14 and 15, St John's Street | | | 2 November 1972 | TL4484558775; 52°12′29″N 0°07′06″E | | 1331918 | Upload Photo | Q26616774 |
| 63-65, Bridge Street | II | 63-65, Bridge Street, 16 and 17, St John's Street | | | 2 November 1972 | TL4485458786; 52°12′30″N 0°07′07″E | | 1068752 | Upload Photo | Q26321446 |
| The Divinity School | II | St John's Street | building | | 18 May 1967 | TL4483758737; 52°12′28″N 0°07′06″E | | 1126274 | The Divinity School More images | Q26419245 |
| St John's College, the Buildings Surrounding the First, Second and Third Courts | I | St Johns College | chapel | | 26 April 1950 | TL4476158752; 52°12′29″N 0°07′02″E | | 1332216 | St John's College, the Buildings Surrounding the First, Second and Third Courts More images | Q17527509 |
| St John's College, Stables of Master's Lodge | II | St Johns College | | | 18 May 1967 | TL4470858901; 52°12′34″N 0°06′59″E | | 1125487 | Upload Photo | Q26418497 |
| St John's College, Wilderness Fence Along Queens' Road and Bin Brook | II | St Johns College | | | 2 November 1972 | TL4433558736; 52°12′29″N 0°06′39″E | | 1105691 | Upload Photo | Q26399622 |

=== Trinity Hall ===
| Name | Grade | Location | Type | Completed | Date designated | Grid ref. Geo-coordinates | Notes | Entry number | Image | Wikidata |
|---|---|---|---|---|---|---|---|---|---|---|
| Trinity Hall, Waterhouse Building | II | Trinity Hall | | | 18 May 1967 | TL4468458471; 52°12′20″N 0°06′57″E | | 1126270 | Upload Photo | Q26419241 |
| Trinity Hall, Boundary Wall on Garret Hostel Lane | II | Trinity Hall | | | 2 November 1972 | TL4467558537; 52°12′22″N 0°06′57″E | | 1126272 | Upload Photo | Q26419243 |
| Trinity Hall, Gatehouse Building | II | Trinity Hall | | | 26 April 1950 | TL4459958528; 52°12′22″N 0°06′53″E | | 1126271 | Upload Photo | Q26419242 |
| Trinity Hall, Latham Building | II | Trinity Hall | | | 2 November 1972 | TL4461958526; 52°12′22″N 0°06′54″E | | 1120899 | Upload Photo | Q26414098 |
| Trinity Hall, North Boundary Wall of Fellows' Garden | II | Trinity Hall | | | 2 November 1972 | TL4459458486; 52°12′20″N 0°06′52″E | | 1323164 | Upload Photo | Q26608915 |
| Trinity Hall, the Buildings Surrounding Front Court, with the West Range of South Court, the Masters Lodge and the Library | I | Trinity Hall | college | | 26 April 1950 | TL4465858498; 52°12′21″N 0°06′56″E | | 1331807 | Trinity Hall, the Buildings Surrounding Front Court, with the West Range of South Court, the Masters Lodge and the Library More images | Q1244704 |
| Garret Hostel Bridge Between Clare Bridge and Trinity Bridge on the Cam | II | The Backs | bridge | | 29 May 1998 | TL4455358508; 52°12′21″N 0°06′50″E | | 1119764 | Garret Hostel Bridge Between Clare Bridge and Trinity Bridge on the Cam More images | Q26413057 |

=== Trinity College ===
| Name | Grade | Location | Type | Completed | Date designated | Grid ref. Geo-coordinates | Notes | Entry number | Image | Wikidata |
|---|---|---|---|---|---|---|---|---|---|---|
| Whewell's Court, Trinity College | II | All Saints Passage, Trinity College | university building | | 18 May 1967 | TL4487258693; 52°12′27″N 0°07′07″E | | 1331806 | Whewell's Court, Trinity College More images | Q26616676 |
| Trinity College, Angel Court | II | Trinity College | | | 2 November 1972 | TL4480258608; 52°12′24″N 0°07′04″E | | 1126268 | Upload Photo | Q26419239 |
| Trinity College, Bishop's Hostel | I | Trinity College | | | 26 April 1950 | TL4469858556; 52°12′22″N 0°06′58″E | | 1125498 | Upload Photo | Q17527323 |
| Trinity College, Entrance Gates to the Fellows' Garden | II | Queens Road, Trinity College | | | 26 April 1950 | TL4433358613; 52°12′25″N 0°06′39″E | | 1331805 | Upload Photo | Q26616675 |
| Trinity College, Field Gates to Queen's Road | I | Trinity College | architectural structure | | 26 April 1950 | TL4441458607; 52°12′24″N 0°06′43″E | | 1126266 | Trinity College, Field Gates to Queen's Road More images | Q17527404 |
| Trinity College, Fountain in Great Court | I | Trinity College | fountain | | 26 April 1950 | TL4474658636; 52°12′25″N 0°07′01″E | | 1331803 | Trinity College, Fountain in Great Court More images | Q17527456 |
| Trinity College, Statue in Whewell's Court | II | Trinity College | | | 2 November 1972 | TL4489158700; 52°12′27″N 0°07′08″E | | 1126269 | Upload Photo | Q26419240 |
| Trinity College, Sundial in Great Court | II | Trinity College | | | 26 April 1950 | TL4474458663; 52°12′26″N 0°07′01″E | | 1126264 | Upload Photo | Q26419236 |
| Trinity College, Trinity Bridge | I | Trinity Bridge, Trinity College | road bridge | | 26 April 1950 | TL4454258597; 52°12′24″N 0°06′50″E | | 1331804 | Trinity College, Trinity Bridge More images | Q17527460 |
| Trinity College, Nevile's Gate to Trinity Lane | II* | Trinity College | arch | | 2 November 1972 | TL4470958572; 52°12′23″N 0°06′59″E | | 1325525 | Trinity College, Nevile's Gate to Trinity Lane More images | Q125798404 |
| Junior Parlour Trinity College | II | 23 and 24, Trinity Street | | | 26 April 1950 | TL4483958659; 52°12′26″N 0°07′06″E | | 1342905 | Upload Photo | Q26626827 |
| Trinity College, Two Lamp Standards Outside the Great Gate on Trinity Street | II | Trinity College | | | 2 November 1972 | TL4480758650; 52°12′25″N 0°07′04″E | | 1125499 | Upload Photo | Q26418506 |
| Trinity College, Wall Running West North West from the Master's Lodge to the River | II | Trinity College | | | 2 November 1972 | TL4470358710; 52°12′27″N 0°06′59″E | | 1126267 | Upload Photo | Q26419238 |
| Trinity College, L Shaped Wall on River Front in South West Portion of the Garden, Abutting on Garrett Hostel Lane | II | Trinity College | | | 26 April 1950 | TL4457058522; 52°12′21″N 0°06′51″E | | 1126265 | Upload Photo | Q26419237 |
| Trinity College, the Buildings Surrounding Great Court, Nevile's Court and New Court, and Including King's Hostel | I | Trinity College | library building | | 26 April 1950 | TL4469658629; 52°12′25″N 0°06′58″E | | 1106371 | Trinity College, the Buildings Surrounding Great Court, Nevile's Court and New Court, and Including King's Hostel More images | Q8037746 |

== See also ==
- Grade I listed buildings in Cambridgeshire
- Grade II* listed buildings in Cambridgeshire

== Sources ==
- Bradley, Simon; Pevsner, Nikolaus (2014) [1954], Cambridgeshire, The Buildings of England, New Haven and London: Yale University Press, ISBN 978-0-300-20596-1
