= Stibbington Hall =

17th-century country house in Cambridgeshire, England

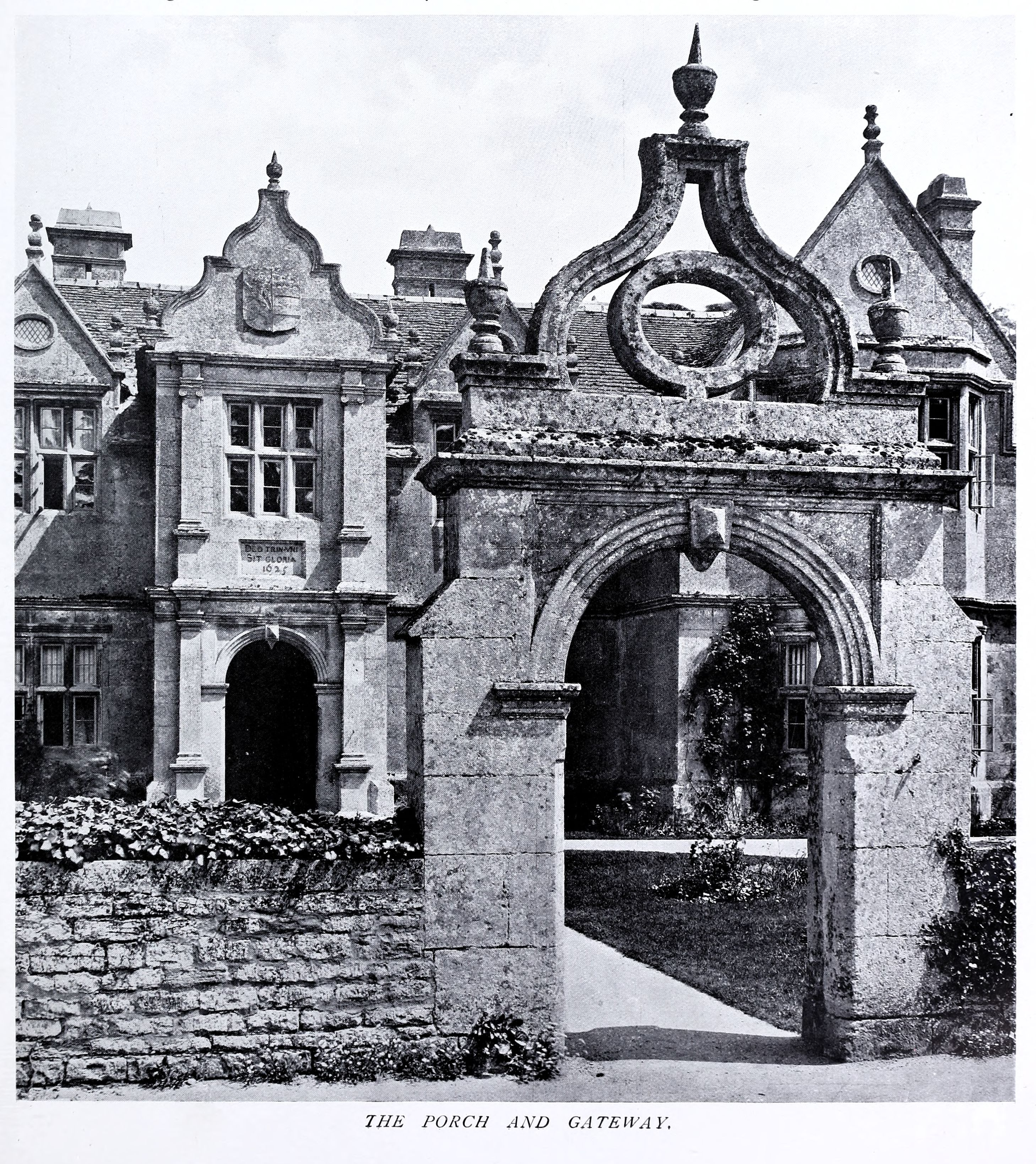
- The entry and gateway of Stibbington Hall

- Location within Cambridgeshire

General information
- Type: Country house
- Architectural style: Jacobean
- Location: Sibson-cum-Stibbington, Huntingdonshire
- Coordinates: 52.575560°N 0.394082°W
- Completed: By 1625/6

Listed Building – Grade I
- Designated: 24 September 1951
- Reference no.: 1222241

Stibbington Hall is a Jacobean country house in Sibson-cum-Stibbington, Huntingdonshire, England. The house and its gateway are Grade I-listed with English Heritage, and additional structures on the 19-acre property are also listed. Sir Nikolaus Pevsner regarded the hall as having "the finest Jacobean façade in the county".

Stibbington Hall lies on the River Nene in Huntingdonshire, now a district in Cambridgeshire. It is built of Ketton stone from Rutland with a roof of Collyweston slate from Northamptonshire.

Very little is known of the origins of Stibbington Hall. The date 1625 (1626), along with the motto DEO TRIN-UNI SIT GLORIA (trans. Glory be to the one triune God), are inscribed on a sunken panel on the façade. Carved onto a raised shield on the front gable are the arms of Peter Edwards of Alleston or Alston (lion rampant) and his wife, Joan (or Jane) Knight of Piddington (Gules two bars argent in chief three wolves' heads erased of the second). The initials "I.E. and I.H." (J.E. and J.H.) are carved next to the panel. In 1619, Edwards' widow remarried John Hanger (1579–1638), the rector of Stibbington, who presumably lived at the hall with her. The initials are presumably for Peter's son John Edwards and his wife, but could possibly be for John and Joan Hanger.

The house underwent renovations in the 17th, 18th, and 20th centuries.

== See also ==
- Grade I listed buildings in Cambridgeshire
