= Stibbington =

Village in Cambridgeshire, England

Coordinates: 52.57°N 0.40°W

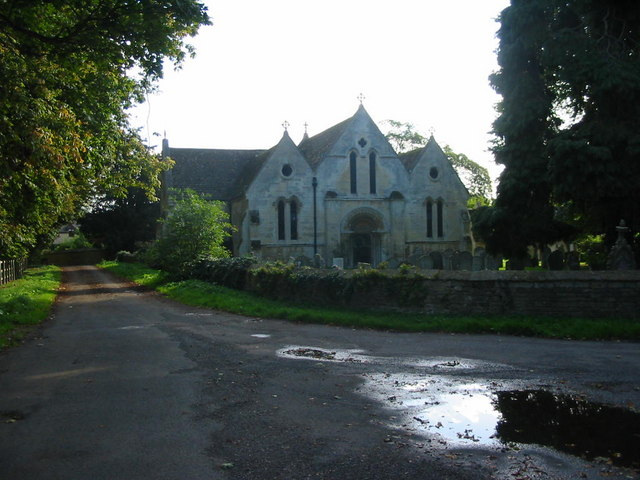
- Stibbington Church

- Location within Cambridgeshire
- Population: 473 (2011)
- OS grid reference: TL084981
- District: Huntingdonshire
- Shire county: Cambridgeshire
- Region: East
- Country: England
- Sovereign state: United Kingdom
- Post town: Peterborough
- Postcode district: PE8
- Police: Cambridgeshire
- Fire: Cambridgeshire
- Ambulance: East of England
- UK Parliament: North West Cambridgeshire

Stibbington is a village in Cambridgeshire, England, located approximately 6 miles (10 km) west of Peterborough city centre in the civil parish of Sibson-cum-Stibbington. It is situated in the far north-west corner of Huntingdonshire, which is a non-metropolitan district of Cambridgeshire, as well as a historic county of England.

== History ==
In 1085 William the Conqueror ordered that a survey should be carried out across his kingdom to discover who owned which parts and what it was worth. The survey took place in 1086 and the results were recorded in what, since the 12th century, has become known as the Domesday Book. Starting with the king himself, for each landholder within a county there is a list of their estates or manors; and, for each manor, there is a summary of the resources of the manor, the amount of annual rent that was collected by the lord of the manor both in 1066 and in 1086, together with the taxable value.

Stibbington was listed in the Domesday Book in the Hundred of Upton in Huntingdonshire; the name of the settlement was written as Stebintone and Stebintune in the Domesday Book. In 1086 there were three manors at Stibbington; the annual rent paid to the lords of the manors in 1066 had been £0. 1 and the rent had increased to £1 in 1086.

The Domesday Book does not explicitly detail the population of a place but it records that there were 18 households at Stibbington. There is no consensus about the average size of a household at that time; estimates range from 3. 5 to 5. 0 people per household. Using these figures then an estimate of the population of Stibbington in 1086 is that it was within the range of 63 and 90 people.

The Domesday Book uses a number of units of measure for areas of land that are now unfamiliar terms, such as hides and ploughlands. In different parts of the country, these were terms for the area of land that a team of eight oxen could plough in a single season and are equivalent to 120 acres (49 hectares); this was the amount of land that was considered to be sufficient to support a single family. By 1086, the hide had become a unit of tax assessment rather than an actual land area; a hide was the amount of land that could be assessed as £1 for tax purposes. The survey records that there were five ploughlands at Stibbington in 1086. In addition to the arable land, there was 17 acres (7 hectares) of meadows, 4 acres (2 hectares) of woodland and a water mill at Stibbington.

The tax assessment in the Domesday Book was known as geld or danegeld and was a type of land-tax based on the hide or ploughland. It was originally a way of collecting a tribute to pay off the Danes when they attacked England, and was only levied when necessary. Following the Norman Conquest, the geld was used to raise money for the King and to pay for continental wars; by 1130, the geld was being collected annually. Having determined the value of a manor's land and other assets, a tax of so many shillings and pence per pound of value would be levied on the land holder. While this was typically two shillings in the pound the amount did vary; for example, in 1084 it was as high as six shillings in the pound. For the manors at Stibbington the total tax assessed was 4. 5 geld.

By 1086 there was already a church at Stibbington.

== Government ==
Stibbington is part of the civil parish of Sibson-cum-Stibbington, which has a parish council. The parish council is elected by the residents of the parish who have registered on the electoral roll; the parish council is the lowest tier of government in England. A parish council is responsible for providing and maintaining a variety of local services including allotments and a cemetery; grass cutting and tree planting within public open spaces such as a village green or playing fields. The parish council reviews all planning applications that might affect the parish and makes recommendations to Huntingdonshire District Council, which is the local planning authority for the parish. The parish council also represents the views of the parish on issues such as local transport, policing and the environment. The parish council raises its own tax to pay for these services, known as the parish precept, which is collected as part of the Council Tax. The parish precept for the financial year 2014–15 was £11, 000. The parish council consists of eight parish councillors.

Stibbington was in the historic and administrative county of Huntingdonshire until 1965. From 1965, the village was part of the new administrative county of Huntingdon and Peterborough. Then in 1974, following the Local Government Act 1972, Stibbington became a part of the county of Cambridgeshire. The second tier of local government is Huntingdonshire District Council which is a non-metropolitan district of Cambridgeshire and has its headquarters in Huntingdon. Huntingdonshire District Council has 52 councillors representing 29 district wards. Huntingdonshire District Council collects the council tax, and provides services such as building regulations, local planning, environmental health, leisure and tourism. Stibbington is a part of the district ward of Stilton, Folksworth & Washingley and is represented on the district council by one councillor. District councillors serve for four-year terms following elections to Huntingdonshire District Council.

For Stibbington the highest tier of local government is Cambridgeshire County Council which has administration buildings in Cambridge. The county council provides county-wide services such as major road infrastructure, fire and rescue, education, social services, libraries and heritage services. Cambridgeshire County Council consists of 69 councillors representing 60 electoral divisions. Stibbington is part of the electoral division of Sawtry & Stilton and is represented on the county council by two councillors.

At Westminster Stibbington is in the parliamentary constituency of North West Cambridgeshire, and elects one Member of Parliament (MP) by the first past the post system of election. Stibbington is represented in the House of Commons by Sam Carling (Labour). Sam Carling has represented the constituency since 2024. The previous member of parliament was Shailesh Vara (Conservative) who represented the constituency between 2005 and 2024.

== Transport ==
South of the village, the A1 was dualled, from early 1959, as the North of Water Newton to Stibbington section, built by A. Monk Ltd, of Padgate. Until April 1959, the railway level crossing took the Northampton and Peterborough Railway over the A1. The Stibbington bypass opened around late 1959. The bridge over the railway, nearby to the west, can be seen in the 1983 Octopussy film, filmed in September 1982.

North of the village, a three-lane road, of three-quarters of a mile, was built towards Wansford in 1956. In 1973, Huntingdonshire agreed to a £600,000 improvement to dual the A1 to Wansford. The A1 section in the early 1970s was a short three-lane single carriageway, which was a known dangerous stretch. The Stibbington-Wansford Improvement began in mid-1973. It had cost £761,700 by 1975. The carriageway, and concrete bridge across the Nene, opened on Monday 21 April 1975, built by A. Monk Ltd.

The former route through Wansford became the A6118. Although the Stibbington-Wansford section was the last single-carriageway section on the A1, between south Hertfordshire and Northumberland, there would be many contraflow sections for repairs for the next twenty years.

== Demography ==
=== Population ===
In the period 1801 to 1901 the population of Sibson-cum-Stibbington was recorded every ten years by the UK census. During this time the population was in the range of 324 (the lowest was in 1801) and 790 (the highest was in 1851).

From 1901, a census was taken every ten years with the exception of 1941 (due to the Second World War).

Parish	1911	1921	1931	1951	1961	1971	1981	1991	2001	2011
Sibson-cum-Stibbington	432	408	495	682	447	388	470	464	438	473

All population census figures from report Historic Census figures Cambridgeshire to 2011 by Cambridgeshire Insight.

In 2011, the parish covered an area of 1,542 acres (624 hectares) and the population density of Sibson-cum-Stibbington in 2011 was 196. 3 persons per square mile (75. 8 per square kilometre).

== Culture and community ==
The church stands about a quarter of a mile east of the Great North Road near the ford to Sutton. Stibbington Hall, near the church, is a Grade I-listed 17th-century house. Stibbington House lies between the Elton Road and the Nene, and was the residence of Sir Stephen Hastings. Stibbington Manor Farm, on the south-west side of the A1 near Sibson Manor House, was built about 1625.

There is a popular environmental residential centre at Stibbington that hosts a variety of courses for primary age children.
