= Church of St Mary the Virgin, Godmanchester =

Historic church in Godmanchester, Huntingdonshire, England

Coordinates: 52.3204°N 0.1741°W

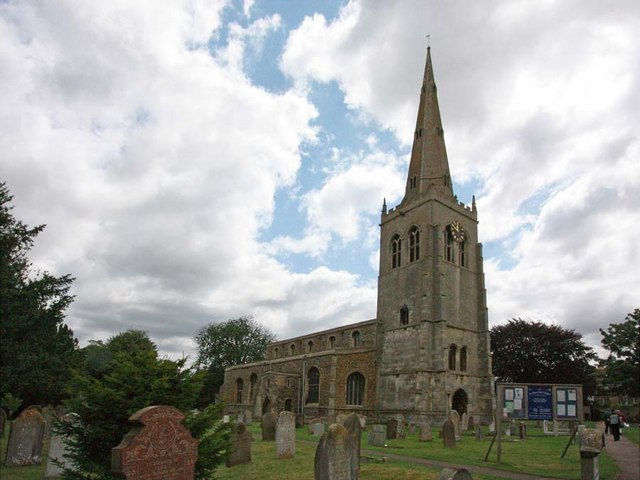
St Mary's Church, Godmanchester

The Church of St Mary the Virgin is a Church of England parish church in Godmanchester, Cambridgeshire. The church is a Grade I listed building with its earliest phase dating to the 13th century. Most of the structure is of 13th- to 15th-century date but the tower was built in 1623. The stalls with misericords date from the late 15th century.

The parish of Godmanchester is part of the Diocese of Ely.

The Parish Church of St Mary the Virgin, Godmanchester: A History, (Friends of St Mary’s Godmanchester, 2019) was published by Dr Ken Sneath.

In October 2003, BBC1's Songs Of Praise was once again (previous transmission 1976) hosted by St Mary's and featured the new hymn tune Godmanchester, written by the then vicar, Peter Moger.
