= St John the Baptist's Church, Barnack =

Coordinates: 52.6326°N 0.407°W

St John the Baptist, Barnack
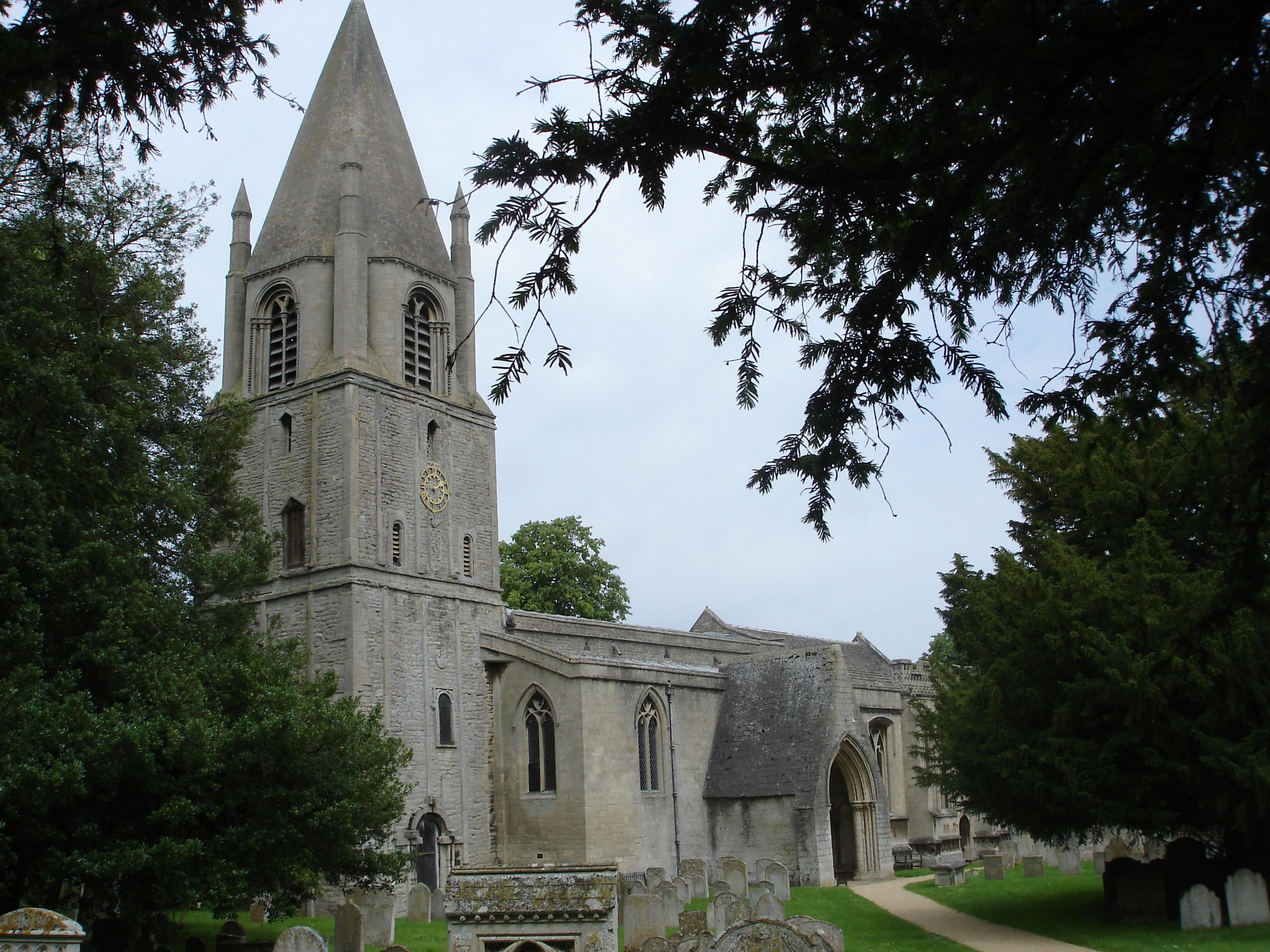
- St John the Baptist's Church, Barnack

- Location in Cambridgeshire
- OS grid reference: TF 07933 05060
- Location: Barnack, Cambridgeshire
- Country: England
- Denomination: Church of England
- Churchmanship: Broad
- Website: https://parishnews-online.co.uk/st-john-the-baptist-church-barnack/

History
- Dedication: John the Baptist

Architecture
- Functional status: Active
- Heritage designation: Grade I
- Designated: 19 March 1962

Administration
- Province: Canterbury
- Diocese: Peterborough
- Archdeaconry: Oakham
- Deanery: Peterborough
- Parish: Barnack with Ufford

Clergy
- Rector: Reverend Gary Alderson

The Church of St John the Baptist, Barnack is a Church of England parish church in the village of Barnack, now in the City of Peterborough unitary authority area of the ceremonial county of Cambridgeshire, England.

== Description ==
Barnack was part of the Soke of Peterborough, a historic area that was traditionally part of Northamptonshire. Barnack is 3.5 miles (6 km) south-east of Stamford in Lincolnshire. The church is a Grade I listed building.

The church, dedicated to John the Baptist, is noted in particular for its Anglo-Saxon tower to which was added a spire of circa 1200, possibly one of the earliest spires in England.

In the north aisle is a large Romanesque sculpture of a seated Christ in Majesty that was discovered under the floor in 1931. Estimates of the date of the Christ vary widely, from the latter part of the 10th century to circa 1200; the Corpus of Romanesque Sculpture in Britain and Ireland settles on the late 12th century.

Simon Jenkins gives the church four stars in his England's Thousand Best Churches (1999) and highlights as features the tower, the stiff-leaf font and the Christ in Majesty.

The height of the surviving Anglo-Saxon work in the tower is 55 feet (17 metres), topped by an octagon and spire of 59 feet high (18 metres), giving a total height to the base of the weathervane of 114 feet (35 metres).

== Gallery ==
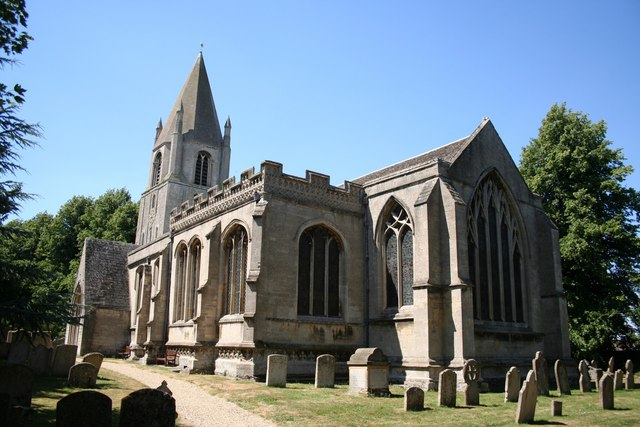
St John from the southeast showing the Lady Chapel at left

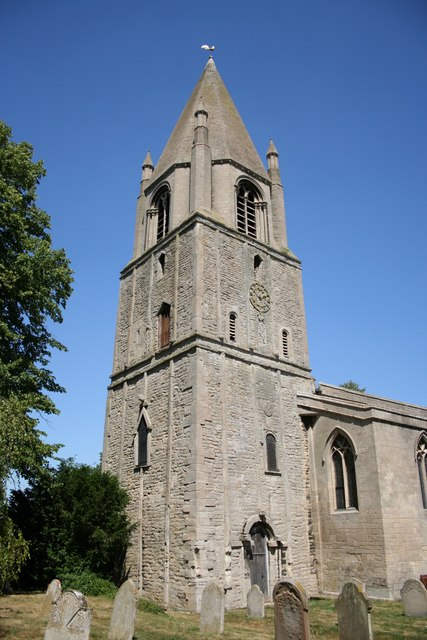
The square Anglo-Saxon tower; the top is later

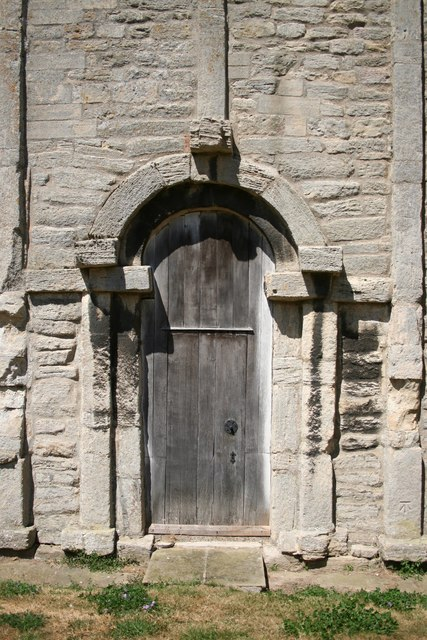
Anglo-Saxon south doorway in the tower

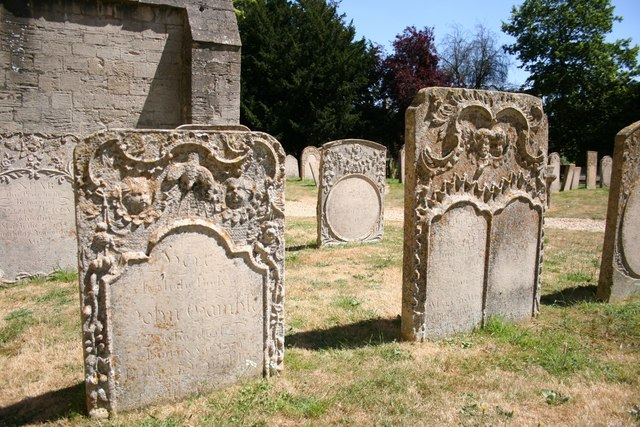
Gravestones in the Churchyard

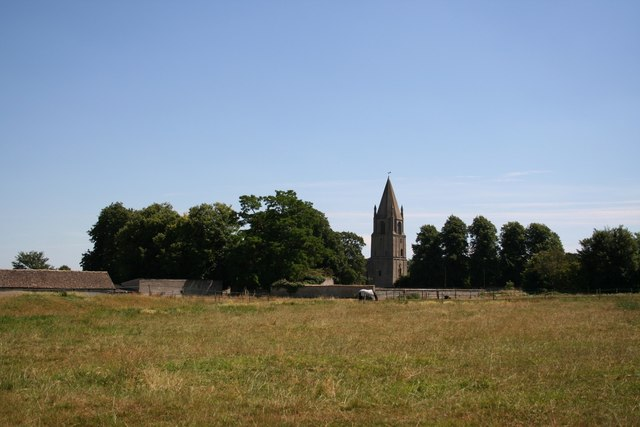
Distant view from the north

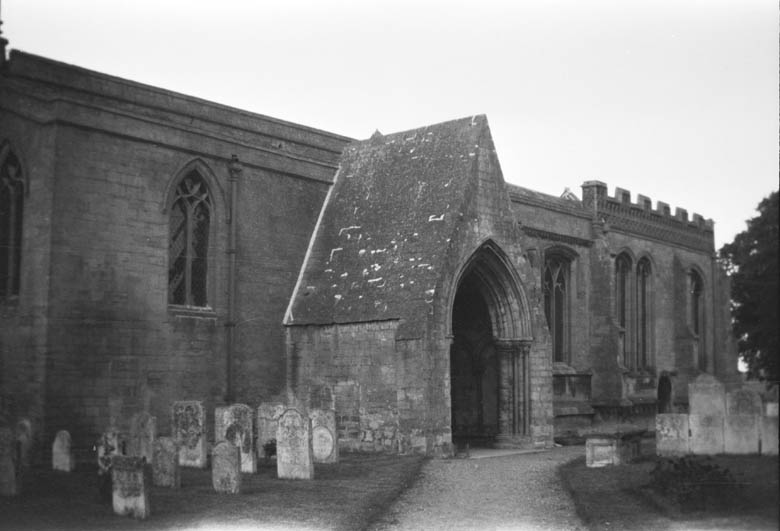
Porch and south aisle, photographed in 1926 by Berit Wallenberg
