= All Saints Church, Landbeach =

Church in Cambridgeshire, England

Coordinates: 52°16′00″N 0°09′45″E

All Saints Church is a Grade I listed parish church in Landbeach, Cambridgeshire, England, with a chancel dating to the thirteenth century.

In the late 18th century, the pulpit and some pews along with the chancel and tower screens were removed from Jesus College, Cambridge, and installed in the church by the rector of the time.
