= St Mary's Church, Huntingdon =

Church in Huntingdon, Cambridgeshire, England

Coordinates: 52.3289°N 0.1804°W

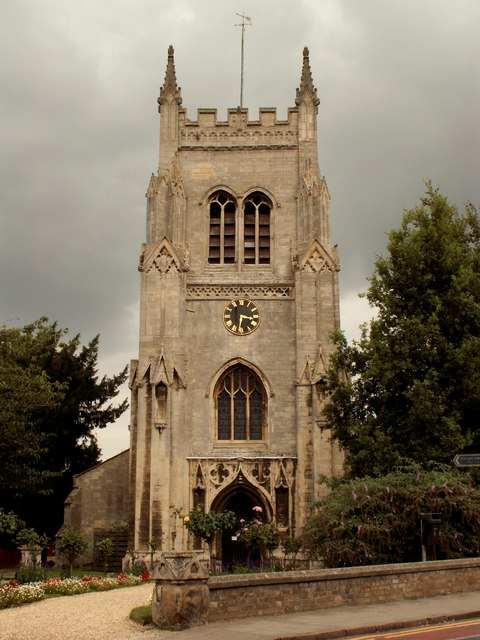
St Mary's Church

St Mary's Church is located in Huntingdon, Cambridgeshire, England. The church is said to have been the "Mother Church of Huntingdon". It occupies what is probably the original site of Huntingdon Priory of Austin Canons, founded in 1140 by Eustace de Lovetot, and seems to have been used initially as a parochial church upon the removal of the priory to the east end of town during the reign of Henry II.

In July 1607, the building fell down, and construction of the present church commenced in March of the following year and finished in 1620. The church's organ chamber and vestry were built later in 1869, and further restorations were carried out in 1876.

It was listed as a Grade I building in January 1951.

== Architecture and fittings ==
The church consists of chancel, cloistered nave, aisles, south porch and a western tower, of Perpendicular Gothic era. Crocketed pinnacles and buttresses are enriched with panelling and niches. The nave is divided from the aisles by four arches on each side, supported by round and octagonal columns. Some of the piers, as well as the chancel, exhibit portions of Early English Period and Decorated Gothic work. There is a stone pulpit, the gift of John Montagu, 7th Earl of Sandwich. The font is Early English, with a plain octagonal bowl, resting on clustered shafts.

The whole building was restored in 1876, adding open oak seats and a new triplet east window (the latter a gift from Gerald Vesey, Archdeacon of Huntingdon) and installing its present eight bells (presented by M. E. Maill). This was under the direction of Reginald Blomfield and was completed at a cost, exclusive of special gifts, of over £2,000. There is a monument to the family of De Carcassonett, erected in 1749, and one erected by the officers of the 31st (Huntingdonshire) Regiment, to the memory of their comrades who fell in the Crimean War. The church has seats for 550 persons. The earliest entry in the register of St. Mary's dates from the year 1593.
