= Sibson-cum-Stibbington =

Civil parish in Cambridgeshire, England

Coordinates: 52°34′17″N 0°23′36″W

Sibson-cum-Stibbington is a civil parish in the Huntingdonshire district of Cambridgeshire, England. The parish includes the villages of Sibson and Stibbington, together with Wansford railway station and that part of Wansford village south of the River Nene. The Nene forms the northern boundary of the parish, in a large loop around it from west to east.

From 1894 to 1935 the parish was under the administrative responsibility of Barnack Rural District in the Soke of Peterborough even though the parish was then in Huntingdonshire; it then transferred to Norman Cross Rural District.

== Demography ==
=== Population ===
In the period 1801 to 1901 the population of Sibson-cum-Stibbington was recorded every ten years by the UK census. During this time the population was in the range of 324 (the lowest was in 1801) and 790 (the highest was in 1851).

From 1901, a census was taken every ten years with the exception of 1941 (due to the Second World War).

Parish	1911	1921	1931	1951	1961	1971	1981	1991	2001	2011
Sibson-cum-Stibbington	432	408	495	682	447	388	470	464	438	473

All population census figures from report Historic Census figures Cambridgeshire to 2011 by Cambridgeshire Insight.

In 2011, the parish covered an area of 1,542 acres (624 hectares) and the population density of Sibson-cum-Stibbington in 2011 was 196.3 persons per square mile (75.8 per square kilometre).
