= Fenland District Council elections =

Local government elections in Cambridgeshire, England

Fenland District Council in Cambridgeshire, England is elected every four years. Since the last boundary changes in 2023, the council has comprised 43 councillors representing 18 wards, with each ward electing one, two or three councillors.

Fenland rejected the introduction of a directly elected mayor by 17,296 votes to 5,509, on a turnout of just under 34%, in a referendum held in July 2005.

== Council elections ==
Election	Conservative	Labour	Liberal Democrat (Note: Liberal Party prior to 1982, SDP-Liberal Alliance from 1982 to 1988.)	Green	Others	Total
1973	20	8	0	0	12	40
1976	27	8	1	0	4	40 (Note: New ward boundaries: The District of Fenland (Electoral Arrangements) Order 1975.)
1979	24	6	3	0	7	40
1983	22	8	6	0	4	40
1987	25	4	6	0	5	40
1991	27	6	2	0	5	40 (Note: Minor alterations to district boundaries: The Cambridgeshire, Essex, Hertfordshire and Lincolnshire (County Boundaries) Order 1989 and The Cambridgeshire, Norfolk and Suffolk (County Boundaries) Order 1990.)
1995	14	21	2	0	3	40
1999	28	7	1	0	3	40 (Note: One seat was left vacant at this election.)
2003	36	3	0	0	1	40 (Note: New ward boundaries: The District of Fenland (Electoral Changes) Order 2002.)
2007	39	0	0	0	1	40
2011	34	0	2	0	4	40
2015	34	0	2	0	3	39 (Note: New ward boundaries: The Fenland (Electoral Changes) Order 2014.)
2019	26	0	2	1	10	39
2023	35	0	2	0	6	43 (Note: New ward boundaries: The Fenland (Electoral Changes) Order 2023.)

=== Composition since 1973 ===
- Notes:

== District result maps ==
2003 results map

2007 results map

2011 results map

2015 results map

2019 results map

2023 results map

== By-election results ==
=== 1995-1999 ===
Manea By-Election 6 March 1997
Party	Candidate	Votes	%	±%
Conservative		278	50.1	
Labour		133	24.0	
Independent		98	17.6	
Liberal Democrats		46	8.2	
Majority		145	26.1	
Turnout		555	50.6	
Conservative gain from Labour		Swing		

Leverington By-Election 31 July 1997
Party	Candidate	Votes	%	±%
Conservative		434	56.7	+10.8
Labour		252	32.9	−21.2
Independent		79	10.3	+10.3
Majority		182	23.8	
Turnout		765	24.4	
Conservative gain from Labour		Swing		

March West By-Election 31 July 1997
Party	Candidate	Votes	%	±%
Labour		574	50.6	−0.3
Conservative		561	49.4	+0.3
Majority		13	1.2	
Turnout		1,135	27.7	
Labour hold		Swing		

March East By-Election 30 October 1997
Party	Candidate	Votes	%	±%
Labour		707	59.4	+8.2
Conservative		483	40.6	+10.0
Majority		224	18.8	
Turnout		1,190		
Labour hold		Swing		

=== 1999-2003 ===
Manea By-Election 24 June 1999
Party	Candidate	Votes	%	±%
Conservative		298	71.8	+71.8
Labour		57	13.7	−37.3
Liberal Democrats		42	10.1	−38.9
Independent Labour		18	4.3	+4.3
Majority		241	58.1	
Turnout		415	37.6	
Conservative gain from Labour		Swing		

March East By-Election 7 June 2001
Party	Candidate	Votes	%	±%
Labour		1,596	49.6	
Conservative		1,366	42.4	
Liberal Democrats		258	8.0	
Majority		230	7.2	
Turnout		3,220		
Labour gain from Conservative		Swing		

Whittlesey Bassenhally By-Election 12 July 2001
Party	Candidate	Votes	%	±%
Conservative		402	49.2	+2.0
Liberal Democrats		343	42.0	−0.8
Labour		72	8.8	−1.2
Majority		59	7.2	
Turnout		817	25.7	
Conservative hold		Swing		

Wisbech South West By-Election 26 July 2001
Party	Candidate	Votes	%	±%
Conservative		546	65.4	+20.5
Labour		289	34.6	+10.1
Majority		257	30.8	
Turnout		835	16.5	
Conservative hold		Swing		

=== 2003-2007 ===
Roman Bank By-Election 30 September 2004
Party	Candidate	Votes	%	±%
Conservative	Philip Hatton	501	50.2	−21.9
Liberal Democrats	Maddy Forster	254	25.5	+25.5
Independent		155	15.5	+15.5
Labour		88	8.8	−19.1
Majority		247	24.7	
Turnout		998	21.0	
Conservative hold		Swing		

Manea By-Election 2 February 2006
Party	Candidate	Votes	%	±%
Conservative	Robert Sears	264	45.0	
Liberal Democrats	Christopher Howes	136	23.2	
Independent	Mark Archer	136	23.2	
Independent	Stephen Wilson	39	6.6	
Labour	Richard Hibbert	12	2.0	
Majority		128	21.8	
Turnout		587	42.1	
Conservative hold		Swing		

Slade Lode By-Election 13 July 2006
Party	Candidate	Votes	%	±%
Conservative	Florence Newell	259	57.2	+17.8
Liberal Democrats	Christopher Howes	194	42.8	+12.0
Majority		65	14.4	
Turnout		453	26.7	
Conservative hold		Swing		

=== 2007-2011 ===
Parsons Drove and Wisbech St Mary By-Election 3 April 2008
Party	Candidate	Votes	%	±%
Conservative	Phil Wait	646	61.8	
Labour	Dave Goode	191	18.3	
Independent	Paul Carpenter	119	11.4	
UKIP	Paul Clapp	55	5.3	
Liberal Democrats	Chris Howes	35	3.3	
Majority		455	43.5	
Turnout		1,046		
Conservative hold		Swing		

Parson Drove and Wisbech St Mary By-Election 11 December 2008
Party	Candidate	Votes	%	±%
Conservative	Robert Scrimshaw	512	50.6	
Liberal Democrats	Gavin Booth	208	20.6	
Labour	Dave Goode	190	18.8	
Green	Paul Carpenter	101	10.0	
Majority		304	30.0	
Turnout		1,011		
Conservative hold		Swing		

March West By-Election 8 October 2009
Party	Candidate	Votes	%	±%
Conservative	Steve Count	803	53.9	−5.2
Labour	Martin Field	460	29.9	+29.9
Liberal Democrats	Ann Elliott	250	16.2	−24.7
Majority		370	24.0	
Turnout		1,540	28	
Conservative hold		Swing		

The Mills By-Election 4 March 2010
Party	Candidate	Votes	%	±%
Conservative	Robert Chambers	301	45.9	−11.2
Liberal Democrats	Christopher Howes	264	40.2	−2.7
UKIP	Sandra Rylance	58	8.8	+8.8
Labour	Max Kelly	33	5.0	+5.0
Majority		37	5.7	
Turnout		656	31.8	
Conservative hold		Swing		

Wisbech Kirkgate By-Election 15 April 2010
Party	Candidate	Votes	%	±%
Liberal Democrats	Dave Patrick	287	51.3	
Conservative	Steve Tierney	145	25.9	
Labour	Barry Diggle	74	13.2	
UKIP	Paul Clapp	54	9.6	
Majority		142	25.4	
Turnout		560	31.1	
Liberal Democrats gain from Conservative		Swing		

=== 2011-2015 ===
Staithe By-Election 22 September 2011
Party	Candidate	Votes	%	±%
Conservative	David Hodgson	228	42.0	−13.1
Labour	John White	166	30.6	+1.8
Liberal Democrats	Robert McLaren	90	16.6	+16.6
UKIP	Will Schooling	39	7.2	−8.9
Independent	Phil Webb	20	3.7	+3.7
Majority		62	11.4	
Turnout		543	28.8	
Conservative hold		Swing		

St Marys By-Election 25 October 2012
Party	Candidate	Votes	%	±%
Conservative	Gary Swan	397	62.5	+16.5
Independent	Roy Gerstner	160	25.2	−15.7
Labour	Colin Gale	78	12.3	+12.3
Majority		237	37.3	
Turnout		635		
Conservative hold		Swing		

Hill By-Election 17 January 2013
Party	Candidate	Votes	%	±%
Conservative	Samantha Hoy	319	59.7	+1.3
Labour	Dean Reeves	110	20.6	−6.2
Independent	John White	105	19.7	+19.7
Majority		209	39.1	
Turnout		534		
Conservative hold		Swing		

Parson Drove and Wisbech St Mary By-Election 28 March 2013
Party	Candidate	Votes	%	±%
Conservative	David Broker	384	44.1	−3.0
Liberal Democrats	Mary Lane	240	27.6	−8.5
UKIP	Alan Lay	214	24.6	+24.6
English Democrat	Maria Goldspink	33	3.8	+3.8
Majority		144	16.5	
Turnout		871		
Conservative hold		Swing		

Elm and Christchurch By-Election 9 December 2013
Party	Candidate	Votes	%	±%
Conservative	Michelle Tanfield	301	43.9	−13.1
UKIP	Alan Burbridge	234	34.1	+34.1
Independent	Phil Webb	73	10.6	+10.6
Labour	Dean Reeves	51	7.4	−10.3
Liberal Democrats	Trevor Brookman	27	3.9	−5.6
Majority		67	9.8	
Turnout		686		
Conservative hold		Swing		

Roman Bank By-Election 8 May 2014
Party	Candidate	Votes	%	±%
Conservative	Samantha Clark	763	48.1	−8.8
UKIP	Alan Lay	537	33.8	+33.8
Labour	Barry Diggle	193	12.2	−14.5
Independent	Erbie Murat	70	4.4	+4.4
Liberal Democrats	Stephen Court	24	1.5	−14.9
Majority		226	14.2	
Turnout		1,587		
Conservative hold		Swing		

Medworth By-Election 16 October 2014
Party	Candidate	Votes	%	±%
Conservative	Steve Tierney	257	44.6	−14.5
UKIP	Andrew Hunt	201	34.9	+34.9
Labour	Kathy Dougall	79	13.7	−17.8
Liberal Democrats	Josie Ratcliffe	24	4.2	−5.2
Independent	Erbie Murat	15	2.6	+2.6
Majority		56	9.7	
Turnout		576		
Conservative hold		Swing		

=== 2015-2019 ===
Birch By-Election 21 June 2018
Party	Candidate	Votes	%	±%
Conservative	Ian Benney	326	62.1	+5.9
Liberal Democrats	Helena Minton	113	21.5	+6.9
Independent	Steve Nicholson	86	16.4	+16.4
Majority		213	40.6	
Turnout		525		
Conservative hold		Swing		

=== 2019-2023 ===
Lattersey By-Election 6 May 2021
Party	Candidate	Votes	%	±%
Conservative	Jason Mockett	449	62.7	−3.6
Labour	Jes Hibbert	267	37.3	+3.6
Majority		182	25.4	
Turnout		716		
Conservative hold		Swing		

=== 2023-2027 ===
Whittlesey South By-Election 4 July 2024
Party	Candidate	Votes	%	±%
Conservative	Gurninder Singh Gill	988	47.0	
Independent	Martin Curtis	841	40.0	
Workers Party	Clayton Payne	274	13.0	
Majority		147	7.0	
Turnout		2,103		
Conservative hold		Swing		

Whittlesey North West By-Election 23 October 2025
Party	Candidate	Votes	%	±%
Conservative	Alec Branton	483	47.5	
Reform	Kevin Marston	346	34.1	
Independent	Martin Curtis	127	12.5	
Labour	Theresa Okogwa	60	5.9	
Majority		137	13.5	
Turnout		1,016		
Conservative hold		Swing		
