= 2007 Fenland District Council election =

2007 UK local government election

← 2003	3 May 2007	2011 →

All 40 seats to Fenland District Council 21 seats needed for a majority

	First party	Second party	Third party
Party	Conservative	Liberal Democrats	Labour
Last election	? seats, ?%	? seats, ?%	? seats, ?%
Seats won	39	0	0
	Fourth party	Fifth party	Sixth party
Leader		N/A
Party	Independent	UKIP	Green
Last election		0 seats, 0%	0 seats, %
Seats before		0	0
Seats won	1	0	0
Seat change		0
Popular vote		0
Percentage		0	%
Swing		N/A	%
Council control before election
Conservative
Council control after election
Conservative

Map of the results of the 2007 Fenland council election. Conservatives in blue and independent in grey.

The 2007 Fenland District Council election took place on 3 May 2007 to elect members of Fenland District Council in Cambridgeshire, England. All 40 seats of the council were up for election and the Conservative Party stayed in overall control of the council.

== Election result ==
The results saw the Conservatives strengthen their majority on the council after winning 39 of the 40 seats on the council. Only 13 of the 27 wards were contested, with Conservatives taking the seats in the other 14 wards without opposition. This meant the Conservatives had been guaranteed a majority even before voting, as 18 of their candidates were unopposed and another 4 were in multi-seat wards where there were not enough candidates from other parties.

Labour lost the 3 seats they had been defending, 2 in Waterlees ward in Wisbech and 1 in March East. What was remarkable, however, about the results was areas such as Waterlees ward, traditionally, had been part of larger wards (until the 2003 boundary changes) that were opposition strongholds. Meanwhile, the Liberal Democrats failed to win any seats, but did come within 37 votes in Slade Lode ward in Chatteris. The only non-Conservative elected was independent Mark Archer, who gained Manea from Conservative Robert Sears by almost 200 votes, in a seat which Sears had won in a by-election in 2006.

Fenland local election result 2007
Party	Seats	Gains	Losses	Net gain/loss	Seats %	Votes %	Votes	+/−
Conservative	39	4	1	+3	97.5	67.6	14,898	+0.1%
Independent	1	1	1	0	2.5	5.6	1,236	-1.1%
Liberal Democrats	0	0	0	0	0	19.3	4,250	+16.4%
Labour	0	0	3	-3	0	7.6	1,668	-14.1%

== Ward results ==
Bassenhally
Party	Candidate	Votes	%	±%
Conservative	Ken Mayor	unopposed		
Conservative hold		Swing		

Benwick, Coates and Eastrea (2 seats)
Party	Candidate	Votes	%	±%
Conservative	Thomas Butcher	841		
Conservative	Pamela Potts	774		
Independent		430		
Conservative hold		Swing		
Conservative hold		Swing		

Birch
Party	Candidate	Votes	%	±%
Conservative	Alan Melton	316		
Liberal Democrats	Christine Colbert	252		
Labour	David Biggs	55		
Majority				
Turnout				
Conservative hold		Swing		

Clarkson
Party	Candidate	Votes	%	±%
Conservative	Carol Cox	unoppposed		
Labour				
Majority				
Turnout				
Conservative hold		Swing		

Delph
Party	Candidate	Votes	%	±%
Conservative	Kay Mayor	unopposed		
Conservative hold		Swing		

Doddington
Party	Candidate	Votes	%	±%
Conservative	Geoffrey Harper	unopposed		
Conservative hold		Swing		

Elm and Christchurch (2 seats)
Party	Candidate	Votes	%	±%
Conservative	Malcolm Cotterell	700		
Conservative	Philip Webb	540		
Independent	Robert Pinnock			
Turnout				
Conservative hold		Swing		
Conservative hold		Swing		

Hill (2 seats)
Party	Candidate	Votes	%	±%
Conservative	Simon King		unopposed	
Conservative	Bruce Wegg	unopposed		
Turnout				
Conservative hold		Swing		

Kingsmoor
Party	Candidate	Votes	%	±%
Conservative	Martin Curtis	unopposed		
Majority				
Turnout				
Conservative hold		Swing		

Kirkgate
Party	Candidate	Votes	%	±%
Conservative	Les Sims	unopposed		
Majority				
Turnout				
Conservative hold		Swing		

Lattersey
Party	Candidate	Votes	%	±%
Conservative	Stephen Garratt	unopposed		
Conservative hold		Swing		

Manea
Party	Candidate	Votes	%	±%
	Mark Archer	487		
Conservative	Robert Sears	unopposed		
		Swing		

March East (3 seats)
Party	Candidate	Votes	%	±%
Conservative	Fred Yeulett	1,026		
Conservative	John Clark	1,011		
Conservative	Bernard Keane	981		
Labour	Barry Howlett	724		
Liberal Democrats	Heather Kinnear	357		
Liberal Democrats	Chris Hancox	322		
Turnout				
Conservative hold		Swing		
Conservative hold		Swing		
Conservative hold		Swing		

March North (3 seats)
Party	Candidate	Votes	%	±%
Conservative	Trevor Quince	862		
Conservative	John West	818		
Conservative	Peter Tunley	737		
Liberal Democrats	Paul Adams	586		
Liberal Democrats	Anthony Fey	573		
Liberal Democrats	Verity Roscoe	470		
Turnout				
Conservative hold		Swing		
Conservative hold		Swing		
Conservative hold		Swing		

March West (3 seats)
Party	Candidate	Votes	%	±%
Conservative	Chris Owen	1,049		
Conservative	Janet French	1,045		
Conservative	Peter Skoulding	883		
Conservative hold		Swing		
Conservative hold		Swing		
Conservative hold		Swing		

Medworth
Party	Candidate	Votes	%	±%
Conservative	Jonathan Farmer	360		
Labour	Mark Plumb	196		
Conservative hold		Swing		

Parson Drove and Wisbech St Mary (2 seats)
Party	Candidate	Votes	%	±%
Conservative	Cyril Bellamy			
Conservative	Clifford Edwards			
Turnout				
Conservative hold		Swing		
Conservative hold		Swing		

Peckover
Party	Candidate	Votes	%	±%
Conservative	David Oliver	unopposed		
Majority				
Turnout				
Conservative hold		Swing		

Roman Bank (3 seats)
Party	Candidate	Votes	%	±%
Conservative	Philip Hatton			
Conservative	Michael Humphrey			
Conservative	Chris Seaton			
Turnout				
Conservative hold		Swing		
Conservative hold		Swing		
Conservative hold		Swing		

Slade Lode
Party	Candidate	Votes	%	±%
Conservative	Florence Newell	260		
Liberal Democrats	Chris Howes	223		
Labour	Grant Osbourn	67		
Majority				
Turnout				
Conservative hold		Swing		

St Andrews
Party	Candidate	Votes	%	±%
Conservative	Mike Speechley	unopposed		
Conservative hold		Swing		

St Marys
Party	Candidate	Votes	%	±%
Conservative	Ken Peachey	unopposed		
Conservative hold		Swing		

Staithe
Party	Candidate	Votes	%	±%
Conservative	Roger Green	unopposed		
Conservative hold		Swing		

The Mills
Party	Candidate	Votes	%	±%
Conservative	Ray German	400		
Liberal Democrats	Diane Baldrey	301		
Majority				
Turnout				

Waterlees (2 seats)
Party	Candidate	Votes	%	±%
Labour				
Labour				
Conservative				
Conservative				
Liberal Democrats				
Turnout				
Conservative hold		Swing		
Conservative hold		Swing		

Wenneye
Party	Candidate	Votes	%	±%
Conservative	Peter Murphy			
Liberal Democrats				
Majority				
Turnout				
Conservative hold		Swing		

Wimblington
Party	Candidate	Votes	%	±%
Conservative				
Labour				
Majority				
Turnout				
Conservative hold		Swing		

== Ward results ==
Bassenhally
Party	Candidate	Votes	%	±%
Conservative	Kenneth Mayor	unopposed		
Conservative hold		Swing		

Benwick, Coates and Eastrea (2)
Party	Candidate	Votes	%	±%
Conservative	Thomas Butcher	841		
Conservative	Pamela Potts	774		
Independent	Linda Keppel-Spoor	430		
Turnout		2,045	39	
Conservative hold		Swing		
Conservative hold		Swing		

Birch
Party	Candidate	Votes	%	±%
Conservative	Alan Melton	316	50.7	−15.8
Liberal Democrats	Christine Colbert	252	40.4	+40.4
Labour	David Biggs	55	8.8	−24.7
Majority		64	10.3	−22.7
Turnout		623	33	+4
Conservative hold		Swing		

Clarkson
Party	Candidate	Votes	%	±%
Conservative	Carol Cox	unopposed		
Conservative hold		Swing		

Delph
Party	Candidate	Votes	%	±%
Conservative	Kay Mayor	unopposed		
Conservative hold		Swing		

Doddington
Party	Candidate	Votes	%	±%
Conservative	Geoffrey Harper	unopposed		
Conservative hold		Swing		

Elm and Christchurch (2)
Party	Candidate	Votes	%	±%
Conservative	Malcolm Cotterell	700		
Conservative	Philip Webb	540		
Independent	Robert Pinnock	319		
Turnout		1,559	28	+1
Conservative hold		Swing		
Conservative hold		Swing		

Hill (2)
Party	Candidate	Votes	%	±%
Conservative	Simon King	unopposed		
Conservative	Bruce Wegg	unopposed		
Conservative hold		Swing		
Conservative hold		Swing		

Kingsmoor
Party	Candidate	Votes	%	±%
Conservative	Martin Curtis	unopposed		
Conservative hold		Swing		

Kirkgate
Party	Candidate	Votes	%	±%
Conservative	Les Sims	unopposed		
Conservative hold		Swing		

Lattersey
Party	Candidate	Votes	%	±%
Conservative	Stephen Garratt	unopposed		
Conservative hold		Swing		

Manea
Party	Candidate	Votes	%	±%
Independent	Mark Archer	487	61.4	
Conservative	Robert Sears	306	38.6	
Majority		181	22.8	
Turnout		793	54	
Independent gain from Conservative		Swing		

March East (3)
Party	Candidate	Votes	%	±%
Conservative	Frederick Yeulett	1,026		
Conservative	John Clark	1,011		
Conservative	Bernard Keane	981		
Labour	Barry Howlett	724		
Liberal Democrats	Heather Kinnear	357		
Liberal Democrats	Christopher Hancox	322		
Turnout		4,421	34	+5
Conservative hold		Swing		
Conservative gain from Labour		Swing		
Conservative hold		Swing		

March North (3)
Party	Candidate	Votes	%	±%
Conservative	Trevor Quince	862		
Conservative	John West	818		
Conservative	Peter Tunley	737		
Liberal Democrats	Paul Adams	586		
Liberal Democrats	Anthony Fey	573		
Liberal Democrats	Verity Roscoe	470		
Turnout		4,046	29	+5
Conservative hold		Swing		
Conservative hold		Swing		
Conservative gain from Independent		Swing		

March West (3)
Party	Candidate	Votes	%	±%
Conservative	Christopher Owen	1,049		
Conservative	Janet French	1,045		
Conservative	Peter Skoulding	883		
Liberal Democrats	Stephen Court	727		
Turnout		3,704	32	
Conservative hold		Swing		
Conservative hold		Swing		
Conservative hold		Swing		

Medworth
Party	Candidate	Votes	%	±%
Conservative	Jonathan Farmer	360	64.7	
Labour	Mark Plumb	196	35.3	
Majority		164	29.4	
Turnout		556	32	
Conservative hold		Swing		

Parson Drove and Wisbech St Mary (2)
Party	Candidate	Votes	%	±%
Conservative	Cyril Bellamy	unopposed		
Conservative	Clifford Edwards	unopposed		
Conservative hold		Swing		
Conservative hold		Swing		

Peckover
Party	Candidate	Votes	%	±%
Conservative	David Oliver	unopposed		
Conservative hold		Swing		

Roman Bank (3)
Party	Candidate	Votes	%	±%
Conservative	Philip Hatton	unopposed		
Conservative	Michael Humphrey	unopposed		
Conservative	Christopher Seaton	unopposed		
Conservative hold		Swing		
Conservative hold		Swing		
Conservative hold		Swing		

Slade Lode
Party	Candidate	Votes	%	±%
Conservative	Florence Newell	260	47.3	+7.9
Liberal Democrats	Christopher Howes	223	40.5	+9.7
Labour	Grant Osbourn	67	12.2	−17.6
Majority		37	6.7	−1.9
Turnout		550	31	+5
Conservative hold		Swing		

St Andrews
Party	Candidate	Votes	%	±%
Conservative	Mike Speechley	unopposed		
Conservative hold		Swing		

St Marys
Party	Candidate	Votes	%	±%
Conservative	Kenneth Peachey	unopposed		
Conservative hold		Swing		

Staithe
Party	Candidate	Votes	%	±%
Conservative	Roger Green	unopposed		
Conservative hold		Swing		

The Mills
Party	Candidate	Votes	%	±%
Conservative	Albert German	400	57.1	−4.8
Liberal Democrats	Diane Baldry	301	42.9	+42.9
Majority		99	14.1	−9.6
Turnout		701	35	+4
Conservative hold		Swing		

Waterlees (2)
Party	Candidate	Votes	%	±%
Conservative	Raymond Griffin	538		
Conservative	David Wheeler	528		
Labour	Ann Purt	316		
Labour	Avis Gilliatt	310		
Turnout		1,692	44	+26
Conservative gain from Labour		Swing		
Conservative gain from Labour		Swing		

Wenneye
Party	Candidate	Votes	%	±%
Conservative	Peter Murphy	488	68.3	+12.2
Liberal Democrats	Colleen Bryce	226	31.7	−12.2
Majority		262	36.7	+24.5
Turnout		714	36	+1
Conservative hold		Swing		

Wimblington
Party	Candidate	Votes	%	±%
Conservative	Jillian Tuck	435	67.1	−12.8
Liberal Democrats	Michael Watkins	213	32.9	+32.9
Majority		222	34.3	−25.5
Turnout		648	38	+1
Conservative hold		Swing		
