= 1976 Fenland District Council election =

← 1973	6 May 1976	1979 →

All 40 seats in the Fenland District Council 21 seats needed for a majority
	First party	Second party	Third party
Party	Conservative	Labour	Liberal
Seats won	27	8	1
Popular vote	?	?	?
Percentage	46.7%	27.5%	13.9%
	Fourth party
Party	Independent
Seats won	4
Popular vote	?
Percentage	9.1%
Council control before election
Conservative
Council control after election
Conservative

The 1976 Fenland District Council election took place on 6 May 1976 to elect members of Fenland District Council in the Isle of Ely, Cambridgeshire, England. This was on the same day as the other local elections. The Conservative Party achieved a majority on the council.

== Ward results ==
Benwick and Doddington
Party	Candidate	Votes	%	±%
Conservative	D Dunham*	unopposed		
Conservative hold		Swing		

=== Chatteris East ===
Chatteris East
Party	Candidate	Votes	%
Conservative	R Heading*	unopposed	
Conservative win (new seat)			

=== Chatteris North ===
Chatteris North
Party	Candidate	Votes	%
Conservative	Rita Goodge	unopposed	
Conservative win (new seat)			

=== Chatteris South ===
Chatteris South
Party	Candidate	Votes	%
Conservative	J Weller	unopposed	
Conservative win (new seat)			

=== Chatteris West ===
Chatteris West
Party	Candidate	Votes	%
Conservative	Albert German	unopposed	
Conservative win (new seat)			

=== Elm ===
Elm (2 seats)
Party	Candidate	Votes	%	±%
Conservative	R Curston*	546	45.5	
Independent	Arthur Ingle*	505		
Conservative hold		Swing		
Independent hold		Swing		

=== Leverington ===
Leverington (2 seats)
Party	Candidate	Votes	%	±%
Conservative	Gerald Salter*	unopposed		
Conservative	R Wallace*	unopposed		
Conservative hold		Swing		
Conservative hold		Swing		

=== Manea ===
Manea
Party	Candidate	Votes	%	±%
Conservative	R Morris*	unopposed		
Conservative hold		Swing		

=== March East ===
March East (3 seats)
Party	Candidate	Votes	%
Labour	Fred Clark*	1,088	53.2
Conservative	H Aveling*	959	46.8
Labour	Don Cherry*	899	
Labour	M Boon	882	
Conservative	D Billingsby	776	
Turnout			81.8
Registered electors			
Labour win (new seat)			
Conservative win (new seat)			
Labour win (new seat)			

=== March North ===
March North (3 seats)
Party	Candidate	Votes	%
Labour	G Campbell*	970	46.5
Labour	D Dagless*	956	
Conservative	G Brewin	801	38.4
Labour	B Chapman	792	
Conservative	G Taylor	716	
Conservative	H Smith	602	
Liberal	B Fox	314	15.1
Liberal	J Longley	216	
Turnout			
Registered electors			
Labour win (new seat)			
Labour win (new seat)			
Conservative win (new seat)			

=== March West ===
March West (3 seats)
Party	Candidate	Votes	%
Conservative	Freddie Grounds*	1,028	64.0
Conservative	P Skoulding*	991	
Conservative	D Fleming*	962	
Labour	C Bennett	579	36.0
Labour	J Rose	488	
Labour	F Wilkinson	455	
Turnout			
Registered electors			
Conservative win (new seat)			
Conservative win (new seat)			
Conservative win (new seat)			

=== Newton and Tydd St Giles ===
Newton and Tydd St Giles
Party	Candidate	Votes	%	±%
Conservative	Michael Palmer	362	55.7	
Independent	G Cragg	171	26.3	
Independent	A Cater*	117	18.0	
Conservative gain from Independent		Swing		

=== Outwell and Upwell ===
Outwell and Upwell
Party	Candidate	Votes	%	±%
Conservative	R Hannam	unopposed		

=== Parson Drove and Wisbech St Mary ===
Parson Drove and Wisbech St Mary (2 seats)
Party	Candidate	Votes	%	±%
Independent	Peter Barnes*	668	34.1	
Liberal	Ellis Plumb	592	30.2	
Conservative	P Ward	530	27.0	
Independent	Neil Payne*	524		
Independent	D Barnes	170		
Labour	G Owen	170	8.7	
Independent	Clifford Edwards	73		
Turnout				
Registered electors				
Independent hold		Swing		
Liberal gain from Independent		Swing		

=== Whittlesey Bassenhally ===
Whittlesey Bassenhally
Party	Candidate	Votes	%
Conservative	Geoffrey Shelton	324	72.5
Labour	C Wroath	123	27.5
Turnout			
Registered electors		1,619	
Conservative win (new seat)			
Labour win (new seat)			

=== Whittlesey East ===
Whittlesey East
Party	Candidate	Votes	%	±%
Conservative	P Dennis	259	53.2	
Liberal	G Spenceley	228	46.8	

=== Whittlesey Kingsmoor ===
Whittlesey Kingsmoor
Party	Candidate	Votes	%
Labour	Albert Hannington*	220	55.8
Conservative	L Hart	174	44.2
Majority			
Turnout			
Labour win (new seat)			

=== Wimblington ===
Wimblington
Party	Candidate	Votes	%	±%
Conservative	E Morris*	unopposed		
Conservative hold		Swing		

=== Wisbech East ===
Wisbech East (2 seats)
Party	Candidate	Votes	%
Conservative	Bob Lake*	588	58.9
Conservative	Leslie Slaymaker	559	
Labour	P Pomeroy	410	41.1
Labour	L Purt	380	
Turnout			
Registered electors			
Conservative win (new seat)			
Conservative win (new seat)			

=== Whittlesey Central ===
Whittlesey Central
Party	Candidate	Votes	%	±%
Conservative	Richard Hinton*	unopposed		

=== Whittlesey South ===
Whittlesey South
Party	Candidate	Votes	%	±%
Conservative	Raymond Whitwell	unopposed		

=== Whittlesey West ===
Whittlesey West
Party	Candidate	Votes	%	±%
Conservative	Harold Lilley*	unopposed		

=== Wisbech North ===
Wisbech North (3 seats)
Party	Candidate	Votes	%	±%
Labour	Harry Potter	819	64.0	
Labour	Ken Williams*	735		
Labour	D Perry*	712		
Conservative	S Marshall	460	36.0	
Turnout				
Registered electors				
Labour hold		Swing		
Labour hold		Swing		
Labour hold		Swing		

=== Wisbech North East ===
Wisbech North East (2 seats)
Party	Candidate	Votes	%
Conservative	Beryl Petts*	610	52.7
Conservative	Michael Osborn*	591	
Labour	T Morley	482	
Labour	Ron Harris	548	47.3
Turnout			
Registered electors			
Conservative win (new seat)			
Conservative win (new seat)			

=== Wisbech South West ===
Wisbech South West (3 seats)
Party	Candidate	Votes	%	±%
Conservative	June Bond	1,317	49.6	
Conservative	L Rands*	977		
Conservative	T Piggott*	835		
Liberal	P Coulten	831	31.3	
	C Rolfe	506	19.1	
Turnout				
Registered electors				
Conservative hold		Swing		
Conservative hold		Swing		
Conservative hold		Swing		
