= 2015 Fenland District Council election =

2015 UK local government election

- 7 May 2015

All 39 seats to Fenland District Council 20 seats needed for a majority

	First party	Second party	Third party
Party	Conservative	Liberal Democrats	Labour
Last election	? seats, ?%	? seats, ?%	? seats, ?%
	Fourth party	Fifth party	Sixth party
Party	Independent	UKIP	Green
Last election		seats, %	0 seats, %
Seats before			0
Seats won			0
Percentage		%	%
Swing		%	%
Council control before election
Conservative
Council control after election
Conservative

The 2015 Fenland District Council election took place on 7 May 2015 to elect members of the Fenland District Council in England. It was held on the same day as other local elections. It used the new boundaries from The Fenland (Electoral Changes) Order 2014.

== Results summary ==
Fenland District Council election, 2015
Party	Seats	Gains	Losses	Net gain/loss	Seats %	Votes %	Votes	+/−
Conservative	34	0	0	0		59.9	35,069	+2.9
Independent	3	0	0	-1		11.0	7,059	-1.6
Liberal Democrats	2	0	0	0		5.6	3,599	-9.0
UKIP	0	0	0	0		13.0	8,312	+11.7
Labour	0	0	0	0		10.8	6,923	-6.9
Green	0	0	0	0		4.7	3,021	+2.8

== Ward results ==
Bassenhally (2 seats)
Party	Candidate	Votes	%	±%
Conservative	Christopher Paul Bowden	1,355		
Conservative	Kay Frances Mayor	1,150		
Liberal Democrats	David Chapman	510		
Labour	Colin Gale	367		
Turnout				
Conservative hold		Swing		
Conservative hold		Swing		

=== Benwick, Coates and Eastrea ===
Benwick, Coates and Eastrea (2 seats)
Party	Candidate	Votes	%	±%
Conservative	Thomas Ralph Butcher	1,423		
Conservative	Alexander William Miscandlon	993		
Green	Shane Alexander	730		
Turnout				
Conservative hold		Swing		
Conservative hold		Swing		

=== Birch (Chatteris) ===
Birch (1 seat)
Party	Candidate	Votes	%	±%
Conservative	David Robert Green	780		
UKIP	Sandra Muriel Rylance	405		
Liberal Democrats	Josephine Ratcliffe	203		
Turnout				
Conservative hold		Swing		

=== Clarkson (Wisbech) ===
Clarkson (1 seat)
Party	Candidate	Votes	%	±%
Conservative	Carol Cox	351		
UKIP	Norman Adrian Booth	261		
Labour	Ann Rosemary Purt	185		
Turnout				
Conservative hold		Swing		

=== Doddington and Wimblington ===
Doddington and Wimblington (2 seats)
Party	Candidate	Votes	%	±%
Conservative	Connor, David William	Unopposed	N/A	±0.0
Conservative	Davis, Maureen Thérése	Unopposed	N/A	±0.0
Turnout		N/A	N/A	
Conservative hold		Swing		
Conservative hold		Swing		

=== Elm and Christchurch ===
Elm and Christchurch (2 seats)
Party	Candidate	Votes	%	±%
Conservative	Will Sutton	1,034		
Conservative	Michelle Tanfield	1,047		
UKIP	Martin John Bower	749		
UKIP	Philip John Webb	739		
Green	Jane Margaret Feaviour-Clarke	356		
Green	Anthony David Feaviour	278		
Turnout				
Conservative hold		Swing		
Conservative hold		Swing		

=== Kirkgate (Wisbech) ===
Kirkgate (1 seat)
Party	Candidate	Votes	%	±%
Conservative	Garry Tibbs*	495		−
Independent	David Patrick	424		
Turnout				
Conservative hold		Swing		

Lattersey (1 seat)
Party	Candidate	Votes	%	±%
Conservative				
Turnout				
Conservative hold		Swing		

=== Manea ===
Manea (1 seat)
Party	Candidate	Votes	%	±%
Independent	Ian Michael Woodward	368		
Conservative	Mark Alan Buckton	763		
Turnout				
Conservative hold		Swing		

March East (3 seats)

March North (3 seats)

March West (3 seats)

Medworth (Wisbech)

Octavia Hill (Wisbech)

Parson Drove and Wisbech St Mary (2 seats)

Peckover (Wisbech)

Roman Bank (3 seats)

=== Slade Lode (Chatteris) ===
Slade Lode (1 seat)
Party	Candidate	Votes	%	±%
Conservative		Unopposed	N/A	N/A
Turnout		N/A	N/A	
Conservative hold		Swing		

St Andrews (Whittlesey)

Staithe (Wisbech)

Stonald (Whittlesey)

=== The Mills (Chatteris) ===
The Mills (1 seat)
Party	Candidate	Votes	%	±%
Conservative		Unopposed	N/A	N/A
Turnout		N/A	N/A	
Conservative hold		Swing		

Waterlees Village (Wisbech)

Wenneye (Chatteris)
