= 1979 Fenland District Council election =

1979 UK local government election

← 1976	3 May 1979	1983 →

All 40 seats in the Fenland District Council 21 seats needed for a majority
	First party	Second party	Third party
Party	Conservative	Labour	Liberal
Seats before	27	8	1
Seats won	24	6	3
Popular vote	?	?	?
Percentage	?%	?%	?%
	Fourth party
Party	Independent
Seats before	4
Seats won	7
Popular vote	?
Percentage	?%
Council control before election
Conservative
Council control after election
Conservative

The 1979 Fenland District Council election took place on 3 May 1979 to elect members of Fenland District Council in the Isle of Ely, Cambridgeshire, England. This was on the same day as the 1979 General Election and other local elections however the town and the parish council elections were pushed back to 24 May 1979 and may well have affected both sets of local elections. Despite a net loss of 3 seats the Conservatives retained overall control of the council. Sitting town mayors and deputy mayors were particularly unsuccessful, in Wisbech Labour mayor Charles Bowden and his conservative deputy Feodor Rikovski failed to win seats and in March Labour mayor Don Dagless lost his seat. The Liberals gained two seats in Wisbech.

== 1979 Fenland District Council elections ==
1979 Fenland local election results
Party	Seats	Gains	Losses	Net gain/loss	Seats %	Votes %	Votes	+/−
Conservative	24	0	3	-3	60.0			
Independent	7	2	0	+2	17.5			
Liberal	3	2	0	+2	7.5			
Labour	6	0	1	-1	15.0			

== Ward results ==
(* denotes sitting councillor)

Benwick and Doddington
Party	Candidate	Votes	%	±%
Conservative	Richard Dunham*	747	66	
Independent	Heinz Miller	384	34	
Majority				
Turnout			85.5	
Conservative hold		Swing		

Chatteris East
Party	Candidate	Votes	%	±%
Conservative	Noel Carney	unopposed		
Conservative hold		Swing		

Chatteris North
Party	Candidate	Votes	%	±%
Conservative	Rita Goodge*	unopposed		
Conservative hold		Swing		

Chatteris South
Party	Candidate	Votes	%	±%
Conservative	Geoffrey Brinton	unopposed		
Conservative hold		Swing		

Chatteris West
Party	Candidate	Votes	%	±%
Conservative	Albert German*	unopposed		
Conservative hold		Swing		

Elm (2 seats)
Party	Candidate	Votes	%	±%
Conservative	Mac Cotterell	unopposed		
Independent	Arthur Ingle*	unopposed		
Conservative hold		Swing		
Independent hold		Swing		

Leverington (2 seats)
Party	Candidate	Votes	%	±%
Conservative	Robert Wallace*	unopposed		
Independent	Ronald Dixon	unopposed		
Conservative hold		Swing		
Independent hold		Swing		

Manea
Party	Candidate	Votes	%	±%
Conservative	George Acton	unopposed		
Conservative hold		Swing		

March East (3 seats)
Party	Candidate	Votes	%	±%
Labour	Fred Clark*	1,733	39.7	
Conservative	George Brewin	1,438	32.9	
Labour	Don Cherry*	1,351		
Labour	Wilfred Fordham	992		
Conservative	Andrew Woollard	911		
Liberal	John Longley	775	17.8	
Independent	Bruce Pearce	420	9.6	
Turnout			81.8	
Registered electors				
Labour hold		Swing		
Conservative hold		Swing		
Labour hold		Swing		

March North (3 seats)
Party	Candidate	Votes	%	±%
Independent	Peter Jackman	1,570	35.2	
Conservative	Geoff Taylor	1,451	32.5	
Labour	George Campbell*	1,445	32.4	
Labour	Don Dagless*	1,405		
Labour	Paddy Overland	762		
Turnout				
Registered electors				
Independent hold		Swing		
Conservative hold		Swing		
Labour hold		Swing		

March West (3 seats)
Party	Candidate	Votes	%	±%
Conservative	Freddie Grounds*	1,330	40.7	
Conservative	Doreen Fleming*	1,324		
Conservative	Peter Skoulding*	1,178		
Liberal	Barry Fox	1,028	31.5	
Labour	Ann Clark	908	27.8	
Labour	Alan Guy	709		
Turnout				
Registered electors				
Conservative hold		Swing		
Conservative hold		Swing		
Conservative hold		Swing		

Newton and Tydd St Giles
Party	Candidate	Votes	%	±%
Conservative	Michael Palmer*	unopposed		
Conservative hold		Swing		

Outwell and Upwell
Party	Candidate	Votes	%	±%
Conservative	John Bloom	unopposed		
Conservative hold		Swing		

Parson Drove and Wisbech St Mary (2 seats)
Party	Candidate	Votes	%	±%
Independent	Peter Barnes*	1,348	49.9	
Liberal	Ellis Plumb*	954	35.3	
Independent	Neil Payne	783		
Conservative	Clifford Edwards	397	14.7	
Turnout				
Registered electors		2,569		
Independent hold		Swing		
Liberal hold		Swing		

Whittlesey Bassenhally
Party	Candidate	Votes	%	±%
Conservative	Geoffrey Shelton*	797	64.6	
Independent	George Scott	436	35.4	
Turnout			77.1	
Majority				
Conservative hold		Swing		

Whittlesey East
Party	Candidate	Votes	%	±%
Conservative	Ursula Cuffe	677	69	
Labour	Gordon Owen	303	31	
Majority		374		
Turnout		980	75.0	
Conservative hold		Swing		

Whittlesey Kingsmoor
Party	Candidate	Votes	%	±%
Labour	Albert Hannington*	536	55.1	
Conservative	Donald Roberts	437	44.9	
Majority				
Turnout			73.8	
Labour hold		Swing		

Wimblington and Stonea
Party	Candidate	Votes	%	±%
Independent	Dorothy Camp	583	68.1	
Labour	Geoffrey Lambert	273	31.9	
Majority				
Turnout			83.5	
Independent hold		Swing		

Wisbech East (2 seats)
Party	Candidate	Votes	%	±%
Conservative	Bob Lake*	1,074	55.7	
Conservative	Leslie Slaymaker*	1,043		
Labour	Marian Usher	853	44.3	
Turnout				
Registered electors				
Conservative hold		Swing		
Conservative hold		Swing		

Whittlesey Central
Party	Candidate	Votes	%	±%
Conservative	Richard Hinton*	unopposed		
Conservative hold		Swing		

Whittlesey South
Party	Candidate	Votes	%	±%
Conservative	Raymond Whitwell*	unopposed		
Conservative hold		Swing		

Whittlesey West
Party	Candidate	Votes	%	±%
Conservative	Harold Lilley*	unopposed		
Conservative hold		Swing		

Wisbech North (3 seats)
Party	Candidate	Votes	%	±%
Labour	Harry Potter*	1,168	41.9	
Labour	Ken Williams*	959		
Liberal	Kathleen Brennan	899	32.3	
Liberal	Bernard Martin	889		
Conservative	Feodor Rikovsky	720	25.8	
Labour	Alec Worlding	701		
Turnout				
Registered electors				
Labour hold		Swing		
Labour hold		Swing		
Liberal gain from Labour		Swing		

Wisbech North East (2 seats)
Party	Candidate	Votes	%	±%
Conservative	Beryl Petts*	774	41.1	
Conservative	Michael Osborn*	749		
Liberal	Gary Morgen	614	32.6	
Labour	Charles Bowden	494	26.2	
Labour	Ron Harris	389		
Turnout				
Registered electors				
Conservative hold		Swing		
Conservative hold		Swing		

Wisbech South West (3 seats)
Party	Candidate	Votes	%	±%
Conservative	June Bond*	1,931	57.0	
Liberal	Michael Sharp	1,459	43.0	
Conservative	Leslie Rands*	1,280		
Conservative	Tom Piggott*	1,238		
Turnout				
Registered electors				
Conservative hold		Swing		
Liberal gain from Conservative		Swing		
Conservative hold		Swing		
