= 1973 Fenland District Council election =

1973 UK local government election

7 June 1973	1976 →

All 40 seats in the Fenland District Council 21 seats needed for a majority
	First party	Second party	Third party
Party	Conservative	Labour	Liberal
Seats won	20	8	0
Popular vote	?
	Fourth party
Party	Independent
Seats won	12
Council control before election
N/A
Council control after election
NOC

The 1973 Fenland District Council election took place on 7 June 1973 to elect members for Fenland District Council in the Isle of Ely, Cambridgeshire, England. The Conservative Party became the largest bloc on the new council, with half the seats.

== 1973 Fenland District Council elections ==
1973 Fenland local election results
Party	Seats	Gains	Losses	Net gain/loss	Seats %	Votes %	Votes	+/−
Conservative	20	-	-	-	50			
Independent	12	-	-	-	30			-
Liberal	0	-	-	0	0	0	0	-
Labour	8	-	-	-	20			-

== Summary ==
At the first meeting of the council, Edward Morris (Independent) was elected chairman.

== Ward results ==
For 1 April 1974 (first election 7 June 1973) to 6 May 1976:

=== Benwick and Doddington ===
Benwick and Doddington
Party	Candidate	Votes	%
Independent	R Dunham	334	43.3
Labour	H Miller	280	36.3
Conservative	L Richards	158	20.5
Independent win (new seat)			

=== Chatteris ===
Chatteris (4 seats)
Party	Candidate	Votes	%
Conservative	R Heading	1,308	46.6
Independent	H Oakley	969	32.7
Independent	R Goodger	956	
Independent	S Barrett	885	
Labour	J Oldfield	613	20.7
Conservative win (new seat)			
Independent win (new seat)			
Independent win (new seat)			
Independent win (new seat)			

=== Elm ===
Elm (2 seats)
Party	Candidate	Votes	%
Independent	R Curston	810	81.0
Independent	Arthur Ingle	714	
Labour	V Neave	190	
Independent win (new seat)			
Independent win (new seat)			

=== Leverington ===
Leverington (2 seats)
Party	Candidate	Votes	%
Conservative	J Salter	606	69.0
Conservative	R Wallace	532	
Labour	J Hawkins	272	31.0
Conservative win (new seat)			
Conservative win (new seat)			

=== Manea ===
Manea
Party	Candidate	Votes	%
Conservative	D Morris	231	60.9
Independent	S Rutterford	148	39.1
Conservative win (new seat)			

=== March Eastern ===
March Eastern (5 seats)
Party	Candidate	Votes	%
Labour	Fred Clark	1,975	59.8
Labour	G Campbell	1,818	
Labour	D Daglesst	1,743	
Labour	Don Cherry	1,345	
Conservative	V Aveling	1,325	40.2
Labour	A Fahey	1,268	
Conservative	J Coleman	1,232	
Turnout			
Registered electors			
Labour win (new seat)			
Labour win (new seat)			
Labour win (new seat)			
Labour win (new seat)			
Conservative win (new seat)			

=== March Western ===
March Western (4 seats)
Party	Candidate	Votes	%
Independent	C Spooner	1,445	41.5
Independent	P Skoulding	1,288	
Conservative	F Grounds MBE	1,205	34.6
Conservative	D Fleming	1,123	
Conservative	G Morton	1,108	
Labour	W Fordham	832	23.9
Labour	O Driver	809	
Labour	M Boon	723	
Conservative	S Manley	650	
Labour	P Mulgrew	568	
Majority			
Turnout			
Registered electors			
Independent win (new seat)			
Independent win (new seat)			
Conservative win (new seat)			
Conservative win (new seat)			

=== Newton and Tydd St Giles ===
Newton and Tydd St Giles
Party	Candidate	Votes	%
Independent	A Cater	181	61.4
Independent	T Dykes	114	38.6
Independent win (new seat)			

=== Outwell and Upwell ===
Outwell and Upwell
Party	Candidate	Votes	%
Conservative	D Edgson	unopposed	
Conservative win (new seat)			

=== Parson Drove and Wisbech St Mary ===
Parson Drove and Wisbech St Mary (2 seats)
Party	Candidate	Votes	%
Independent	Peter Barnes	583	47.5
Independent	N Payne	565	
Conservative	R Aveling	492	40.1
Conservative	C Edwards	196	
Labour	E Usher	152	12.4
Turnout			
Registered electors			
Independent win (new seat)			
Independent win (new seat)			

=== Whittlesey Ponnders Bridge and Kingsmoor ===
Whittlesey Ponders Bridge & Kingsmoor (3 seats)
Party	Candidate	Votes	%
Labour	A Hanington	595	50.0
Conservative	D Hinton	594	50.00
Labour	J Lee	511	
Conservative	J French	507	
Conservative	A Bates	495	
Labour	V Copeman	449	
Labour win (new seat)			
Conservative win (new seat)			
Labour win (new seat)			

=== Whittlesey East Central ===
Whittlesey East Central
Party	Candidate	Votes	%
Conservative	M Dixon-Spain	488	74.4
Labour	L Wallace	168	25.6
Majority			
Turnout			
Conservative win (new seat)			

=== Whittlesey West Central ===
Whittlesey West Central
Party	Candidate	Votes	%
Conservative	H Lilley	363	60.2
Labour	H Cocksedge	241	39.8
Majority			
Turnout			
Conservative win (new seat)			

=== Whittlesey Coates ===
Whittlesey Coates
Party	Candidate	Votes	%
Conservative	D Marston	303	78.9
Labour	A Clarke	81	21.1
Majority			
Turnout			
Conservative win (new seat)			

=== Wimblington ===
Wimblington
Party	Candidate	Votes	%
Conservative	E Morris	388	76.7
Independent	P Miller	118	23.3
Majority			
Turnout			
Conservative win (new seat)			

=== Wisbech East ===
Wisbech East (4 seats)
Party	Candidate	Votes	%
Conservative	M Osborn	992	61.7
Conservative	Bob Lake	967	
Conservative	P Green	860	
Conservative	B Petts	846	
Labour	W Pomeroy	617	38.3
Labour	N Ogden	563	
Labour	L Bowden	541	
Labour	H Clarke	535	
Turnout			
Registered electors			
Conservative win (new seat)			
Conservative win (new seat)			
Conservative win (new seat)			
Conservative win (new seat)			

=== Whittlesey Central ===
Whittlesey Central
Party	Candidate	Votes	%
Conservative	Richard Hinton	unopposed	
Conservative win (new seat)			

=== Whittlesey South ===
Whittlesey South
Party	Candidate	Votes	%
Conservative	Raymond Whitwell	unopposed	
Conservative win (new seat)			

=== Whittlesey West ===
Whittlesey West
Party	Candidate	Votes	%
Conservative	Harold Lilley	unopposed	
Conservative win (new seat)			

=== Wisbech North ===
Wisbech North (3 seats)
Party	Candidate	Votes	%
Independent	G Gibbs	1,383	54.5
Labour	D Perry	607	23.9
Labour	K Williams	567	
Conservative	B Drew	547	21.6
Labour	K Brennan	434	
Independent	O Alderman	336	
Turnout			
Registered electors			
Independent win (new seat)			
Labour win (new seat)			
Labour win (new seat)			

=== Wisbech South and West ===
Wisbech South and West (3 seats)
Party	Candidate	Votes	%
Conservative	L Rands	757	37.3
Conservative	H Piggott	695	
Conservative	N Gibson	676	
Labour	Harry Potter	652	32.3
Independent	T Coleman	611	30.2
Labour	M Usher	422	
Turnout			
Registered electors			
Conservative win (new seat)			
Conservative win (new seat)			
Conservative win (new seat)			
