= 1983 Fenland District Council election =

1983 UK local government election

← 1979	5 May 1983	1987 →

All 40 seats in the Fenland District Council 21 seats needed for a majority
	First party	Second party	Third party
Party	Conservative	Labour	Liberal
Seats won	24	8	5
Popular vote	?	?	?
Percentage	?	?%	?%
	Fourth party
Party	Independent
Seats won	3
Popular vote	?
Percentage	?%
Council control before election
Conservative
Council control after election
Conservative

The 1983 Fenland District Council election took place on 5 May 1983 to elect all members of Fenland District Council in the Isle of Ely, Cambridgeshire, England.

== 1983 Fenland District Council elections ==
1983 Fenland local election results
Party	Seats	Gains	Losses	Net gain/loss	Seats %	Votes %	Votes	+/−
Conservative	24			▼				
Independent	3			▲				
Liberal	5		0	▲				
Labour	8			▼				

== Ward results ==
(* denotes sitting councillor)

Benwick and Doddington
Party	Candidate	Votes	%	±%
Conservative	R Dunham	unopposed		
Conservative hold		Swing		

Chatteris East
Party	Candidate	Votes	%	±%
Conservative	A Melton*	unopposed		
Conservative hold		Swing		

Chatteris North
Party	Candidate	Votes	%	±%
Conservative	R Goodger	unopposed		
Conservative hold		Swing		

Chatteris South
Party	Candidate	Votes	%	±%
Conservative	G Brinton*	unopposed		
Conservative hold		Swing		

Chatteris West
Party	Candidate	Votes	%	±%
Conservative	A German*	unopposed		
Conservative hold		Swing		

Elm (2 seats)
Party	Candidate	Votes	%	±%
Conservative	Mac Cotterell*	unopposed		
Independent	A Ingle*	unopposed		
Conservative hold		Swing		
Independent hold		Swing		

Leverington (2 seats)
Party	Candidate	Votes	%	±%
Conservative	R Dixon*	unopposed		
Conservative	R Wallace	unopposed		
Conservative hold		Swing		
Conservative hold		Swing		

Manea
Party	Candidate	Votes	%	±%
Conservative	H Fox	unopposed		
Conservative hold		Swing		

March East (3 seats)
Party	Candidate	Votes	%	±%
Labour	F Clark*	1,064	47.6	
Labour	C Bennett	890		
Labour	D Cherry*	836		
Conservative	G Brewin*	834	37.3	
Conservative	J Thornton	575		
Conservative	K Ansell	522		
Independent	S Green	335	15.0	
Turnout			54.4	
Registered electors				
Labour hold		Swing		
Labour gain from Conservative		Swing		
Labour hold		Swing		

March North (3 seats)
Party	Candidate	Votes	%	±%
Liberal	P Jackman*	879	35.3	
Labour	G Campbell*	860	34.6	
Labour	D Dagless	761		
Conservative	G Taylor*	748	30.1	
Labour	A Clark	714		
Turnout				
Registered electors				
Liberal hold		Swing		
Labour hold		Swing		
Labour gain from Conservative		Swing		

March West (3 seats)
Party	Candidate	Votes	%	±%
Conservative	D Fleming*	891	45.5	
Conservative	F Grounds*	850		
Conservative	P Skoulding*	668		
Liberal	D Dack	621	31.7	
Liberal	B Fox	506		
Labour	D Kent	448	22.9	
Labour	S Smart	419		
Turnout				
Registered electors				
Conservative hold		Swing		
Conservative hold		Swing		
Conservative hold		Swing		

Newton and Tydd St Giles
Party	Candidate	Votes	%	±%
Conservative	M Palmer*	unopposed		
Conservative hold		Swing		

Outwell and Upwell
Party	Candidate	Votes	%	±%
Conservative	G Pritchard	unopposed		
Conservative hold		Swing		

Parson Drove and Wisbech St Mary (2 seats)
Party	Candidate	Votes	%	±%
Independent	Peter Barnes*	649	40.3	
Liberal	Neil Payne	660	41.0	
Conservative	J Foster	301	18.7	
Turnout				
Registered electors				
Independent hold		Swing		
Liberal hold		Swing		

Whittlesey Bassenhally
Party	Candidate	Votes	%	±%
Conservative	K Mayor	330	50.4	
Liberal	S Richards	235		
Independent	D Roberts	90		
Turnout				
Registered electors				

Whittlesey Central
Party	Candidate	Votes	%	±%
Conservative	C Lovell	unopposed		
Conservative hold		Swing		

Whittlesey East
Party	Candidate	Votes	%	±%
Conservative	U Cuffe*			
Liberal	G Spenceley	230		
Conservative hold		Swing		

Whittlesey Kingsmoor
Party	Candidate	Votes	%	±%
Liberal	O Oliver	169	38.6	
Conservative	P Gray	155	35.4	
Majority				
Turnout				

Whittlesey South
Party	Candidate	Votes	%	±%
Conservative	Raymond Whitwell*	unopposed		
Conservative hold		Swing		

Whittlesey West
Party	Candidate	Votes	%	±%
Conservative	Harold Lilley*	unopposed		
Conservative hold		Swing		

Wimblington and Stonea
Party	Candidate	Votes	%	±%
Independent	A Hopper	unopposed		
Independent hold		Swing		

Party	Candidate	Votes	%	±%
Conservative				
Labour				
Majority				
Turnout				

Wisbech East (2 seats)
Party	Candidate	Votes	%	±%
Conservative	Bob Lake*	685	51.7	
Labour	Ron Harris	640	48.3	
Conservative	H Piggott	576		
Labour	A Purt	517		
Turnout				
Registered electors				
Conservative hold		Swing		
Labour gain from Conservative		Swing		

Wisbech North (3 seats)
Party	Candidate	Votes	%	±%
Labour	Harry Potter*	631	53.9	
Labour	Ken Williams*	568		
Liberal	Bernard Martin	539	46.1	
Liberal	Kathleen Brennan*	525		
Labour	A Worlding	418		
Turnout				
Registered electors				
Labour hold		Swing		
Labour hold		Swing		
Liberal hold		Swing		

Wisbech North East (2 seats)
Party	Candidate	Votes	%	±%
Conservative	Beryl Petts*	640	63.6	
Conservative	Michael Osborn*	580		
Liberal	Gary Monger	367	36.4	
Turnout				
Registered electors				
Conservative hold		Swing		
Conservative hold		Swing		

Wisbech South West (3 seats)
Party	Candidate	Votes	%	±%
Conservative	June Bond*	unopposed		
Liberal	Michael Sharp	unopposed		
Conservative	Malcolm Moss	Unopposed		
Turnout				
Registered electors				
Conservative hold		Swing		
Liberal hold		Swing		
Conservative hold		Swing		
