= 1999 Fenland District Council election =

1999 UK local government election

← 1995	6 May 1999	2003 →

All 40 seats to Fenland District Council 21 seats needed for a majority

	First party	Second party	Third party
Party	Conservative	Liberal Democrats	Labour
Last election	? seats, ?%	? seats, ?%	? seats, ?%
	Fourth party
Party	Independent
Council control before election
Conservative
Council control after election
Conservative

The 1999 Fenland District Council election took place on 6 May 1999, to elect 40 members of the Fenland District Council in Cambridgeshire, England. The whole council was up for election, and the Conservative Party gained overall control of the council from no overall control.

== Ward results ==
(*Sitting councillor)

Benwick & Doddington
Party	Candidate	Votes	%	±%
Conservative	G Harper	638	79.8	
Labour	P Waterfield	161	20.2	
Majority		477		
Turnout				

Chatteris East
Party	Candidate	Votes	%	±%
Conservative	A Melton*	451	74.1	
Labour		158	25.9	
Majority		293		
Turnout				

Chatteris North
Party	Candidate	Votes	%	±%
Conservative	P Murphy*	198	56.4	
Labour	G Osbourn	56	16.0	
Independent	C Greenwood	55	15.7	
Liberal Democrats	J Wilson	42	12.0	
Majority		142		
Turnout				

Chatteris South
Party	Candidate	Votes	%	±%
Liberal Democrats	F Newell*	216	65.5	
Conservative	L Ashley	114	34.5	
Majority		102		
Turnout				

Chatteris West
Party	Candidate	Votes	%	±%
Conservative	A German*	350	65.5	
Independent	P Dickerson	184	34.5	
Majority		166		
Turnout				

Elm (2 seats)
Party	Candidate	Votes	%	±%
Conservative	M Cotterell*	538	58.9	
Conservative	E Green*	465	-	
Labour	R Symonds	230	25.2	
Ind. Conservative	R Pinnock	145	15.9	
Turnout				

Leverington (2 seats)
Party	Candidate	Votes	%	±%
Conservative	M Humphrey*	554	62.6	
Conservative	P Webb	473	-	
Labour	B Diggle	331	37.4	
Labour	A Humphreys*	282		
Turnout				

Manea
Party	Candidate	Votes	%	±%
Conservative	H Fox	298	71.8	
Labour	P Osborne	57	13.7	
Independent	S Wilson	42	10.1	
Independent Labour	C Bennett	18	4.3	
Majority		241		
Turnout				

March East (3 seats)
Party	Candidate	Votes	%	±%
Labour	D Cameron	849	47.1	
Labour	B Wales	775	-	
Conservative	B Keane*	729	40.4	
Conservative	M French	656		
Conservative	A Gooch	622		
Labour	M Field*	611		
Independent Labour	Ms C Bennett*	226	12.5	
Majority				
Turnout				

March North (3 seats)
Party	Candidate	Votes	%	±%
Independent	Ms P Brewin*	491	30.8	
Labour	I Manning	477	30.0	
Conservative	J West	472	29.6	
Labour	J Heslop	466		
Conservative	W Boulton	455		
Labour	P Osbourne	388		
Independent Labour	M Manning*	152	9.5	
Independent Labour	Ms C Bennett*	128		
Turnout				

Newton & Tydd
Party	Candidate	Votes	%	±%
Conservative				

March West (3 seats)
Party	Candidate	Votes	%	±%
Conservative	C Owen	877	61.2	
Conservative	P Skoulding	779	-	
Conservative	Ms J French	755	-	
Labour	B Howlett	557	38.8	
Labour	Ms E Agley	433		
Labour	C Osbourne	415		
Turnout				

Wisbech North (3 seats)
Party	Candidate	Votes	%	±%
Labour	S Cawthorne	316	44.1	
Labour	J Diggle*	304	-	
Labour	Ms A Gilliat	258	-	
Liberal Democrats	K Brennan*	242	33.8	
Liberal Democrats	Ms G Dedman	179		
Conservative	R Barnwell	158	22.1	
Turnout				

Wisbech South West (3 seats)
Party	Candidate	Votes	%	±%
Conservative	Ms E A Carlisle*	848	49.3	
Conservative	P Humphrey	767	-	
Conservative	Ms J Tuck	703	-	
Labour	S Massey	27.9		
Independent	J White	392	22.8	
Majority				
Turnout				

Outwell & Upwell
Party	Candidate	Votes	%	±%
Conservative	P West*	unopposed		

Parson Drove and Wisbech St Mary (2 seats)
Party	Candidate	Votes	%	±%
Conservative	C Bellamy	719	46.1	
Independent	P Barnes	533	34.2	
Conservative	B Britain	525		
Liberal Democrats	S Wilson	160	10.3	
Labour	Ms I Henson	147	9.4	
Turnout				

Whittlesey Bassenhally
Party	Candidate	Votes	%	±%
Conservative	C Rodziewicz	448	47.2	
Labour	D Lewis*	406	42.8	
Liberal Democrats	M Larholt	95	10.0	
Majority		42		
Turnout				

Whittlesey Central
Party	Candidate	Votes	%	±%
Conservative	P Gray*	282	68.1	
Labour	R Penton	84	20.3	
Liberal Democrats	Ms J larshot	48	11.6	
Majority		198		
Turnout				

Whittlesey East
Party	Candidate	Votes	%	±%
Conservative	S Garratt	448	68.5	
Labour	A Wilson	206	31.5	
Majority		242		
Turnout				

Whittlesey Kingsmoor
Party	Candidate	Votes	%	±%
Labour	R Hibbert*	211	58.4	
Conservative	J Watson	150	41.6	
Majority		61		
Turnout				

Whittlesy South
Party	Candidate	Votes	%	±%
Conservative	Ms P Potts*			
Liberal Democrats	S Watkins	357	39.3	

Whittlesey West
Party	Candidate	Votes	%	±%
Conservative	R Speechley*	512	67.5	
Labour	Ms M Hart	247	32.5	
Majority				
Turnout				

Wisbech East (2 seats}
Party	Candidate	Votes	%	±%
Conservative	J Barker*	635	56.8	
Conservative	A Green	607	-	
Labour	Ann Purt	322	28.8	
Independent	E Dopson	161	14.4	
Turnout				
Majority				

Party	Candidate	Votes	%	±%
Conservative				
Liberal Democrats				
Majority				
Turnout				

Wimblington
Party	Candidate	Votes	%	±%
Independent	P Jolley*	472	62.3	
Conservative	T McGuinness	286	37.7	
Majority		186		
Turnout				

== Election results ==
One seat was vacant at the time of the election.

Fenland local election result 1999
Party	Seats	Gains	Losses	Net gain/loss	Seats %	Votes %	Votes	+/−
Conservative	28			+13	71.8			
Labour	7			-8	17.9			
Independent	3			-1	7.7			
Liberal Democrats	1			-1	2.6			
Others	0			-3	0.0			
