= 2011 Fenland District Council election =

2011 UK local government election

- 5 May 2011

All 40 seats to Fenland District Council

	First party	Second party	Third party
Leader			N/A
Party	Conservative	Liberal Democrats	Labour
Leader since			N/A
Leader's seat			N/A
Last election	39 seats, 97.5%	0 seats, 0%	0 seats, %
Seats before	38	1	0
Seats won	34	2	0
Seat change	-4	+1	0
	Fourth party	Fifth party	Sixth party
Party	Independent	UKIP	Green
Last election	1	0 seats, %	0 seats, %
Seats before		0	0
Seats won	4	0	0
Seat change	+3	0
Percentage		%	%
Swing		%	%
Council control before election
Conservative
Council control after election
Conservative

Map of the results of the 2011 Fenland council election. Conservatives in blue, independents in grey and Liberal Democrats in yellow.

The 2011 Fenland District Council election took place on 5 May 2011 to elect members of Fenland District Council in Cambridgeshire, England. The whole council was up for election and the Conservative Party stayed in overall control of the council.

== Background ==
In the 2007 election, the Conservatives won 39 of the 40 seats, with the only other seat being won by an independent. However, in April 2010 Liberal Democrat Dave Patrick gained a seat at a by-election from the Conservatives in Kirkgate ward.

A total of 96 candidates stood in the election for the 40 seats on the council. 2 Conservatives candidates were unopposed at the election, Martin Curtis in Kingsmoor and Pop Jolley in Wimblington, a substantial drop from the number at the 2007 election. For the other 38 seats the candidates were 38 Conservatives, 20 Labour, 19 Liberal Democrats, 10 independents, 4 United Kingdom Independence Party and 3 Green Party. The most candidates were in Waterlees ward in Wisbech, where 9 candidates stood for 2 seats on the council.

== Election result ==
The Conservatives retained control of the council, but their majority was reduced slightly. They won 34 of the 40 seats on the council, after losing 4 seats, 3 to independents and 1 to the Liberal Democrats. The wins for the Conservatives included Will Sutton in Elm and Christchurch, where he defeated the former Conservative member of the cabinet Phil Webb, who been deselected before the election and stood as an independent. Conservative leader of the council Alan Melton, who comfortably held his own seat in Birch ward in Chatteris, said he was "ecstatic" at the results, which he said showed support for his party's policies.

The Conservatives losses came in Waterlees, where independents Michael and Virginia Bucknor gained both seats from the Conservatives, and in March West where independent Rob Skoulding took one of the three seats. Meanwhile, Liberal Democrat Gavin Booth gained one of the two seats in Parson Drove and Wisbech St Mary from the Conservatives. After independent Mark Archer and Liberal Democrat Dave Patrick held their seats, this meant the opposition on the council was 4 independent and 2 Liberal Democrat councillors.

Fenland local election result 2011
Party	Seats	Gains	Losses	Net gain/loss	Seats %	Votes %	Votes	+/−
Conservative	34	0	4	▼4	85.0	59.9	24,602	-7.7
Independent	4	3	0	▲3	10.0	11.3	4,647	+5.7
Liberal Democrats	2	1	0	▲1	5.0	10.9	4,463	-8.4
Labour	0	0	0	0	0	15.4	6,321	+7.8
Green	0	0	0	0	0	1.3	541	+1.3
UKIP	0	0	0	0	0	1.2	497	+1.2

== Ward results ==
=== Bassenhally (Whittlesey) ===
Bassenhally
Party	Candidate	Votes	%	±%
Conservative	Ken Mayor	392	79.0	
Liberal Democrats	Tracey Wilkes	104	21.0	
Majority		288	58.0	
Turnout		496	39.8	
Conservative hold		Swing		

=== Benwick, Coates and Eastrea ===
Benwick, Coates and Eastrea (2)
Party	Candidate	Votes	%	±%
Conservative	Ralph Butcher	880		
Conservative	Alex Miscandlon	530		
Independent	Bob Wicks	414		
Labour	Aidan Hervey	248		
Green	Shane Alexander	194		
Turnout		2,266	41.5	+2
Conservative hold		Swing		
Conservative hold		Swing		

=== Birch (Chatteris ===
Birch
Party	Candidate	Votes	%	±%
Conservative	Alan Melton	424	55.4	+4.7
Liberal Democrats	Christine Colbert	234	30.6	−9.8
UKIP	Sandra Rylance	107	14.0	+14.0
Majority		190	24.8	+14.5
Turnout		765	40.6	+8
Conservative hold		Swing		

=== Clarkson (Wisbech) ===
Clarkson
Party	Candidate	Votes	%	±%
Conservative	Carol Cox	258	56.7	
Labour	Ann Purt	127	27.9	
Liberal Democrats	Robert McLaren	70	15.4	
Majority		131	28.8	
Turnout		455	26.2	
Conservative hold		Swing		

=== Delph ===
Delph
Party	Candidate	Votes	%	±%
Conservative	Kay Mayor	434	72.2	
Labour	David Lewis	167	27.8	
Majority		267	44.4	
Turnout		601	39.3	
Conservative hold		Swing		

=== Doddington ===
Doddington
Party	Candidate	Votes	%	±%
Conservative	David Connor	554	76.6	
Liberal Democrats	Janet Feekins	169	23.4	
Majority		385	53.2	
Turnout		723	42.9	
Conservative hold		Swing		

=== Elm and Christchurch ===
Elm and Christchurch (2)
Party	Candidate	Votes	%	±%
Conservative	Mac Cotterell	711		
Conservative	Will Sutton	489		
Independent	Phil Webb	268		
Labour	Nicholas Poole	221		
Independent	Robert Pinnock	198		
Liberal Democrats	Verity Roscoe	118		
Turnout		2,005	34.3	+6
Conservative hold		Swing		
Conservative hold		Swing		

=== Hill (Wisbech) ===
Hill (2)
Party	Candidate	Votes	%	±%
Conservative	Simon King	797		
Conservative	Bruce Wegg	677		
Labour	Dean Reeves	366		
Liberal Democrats	Luke Roscoe	202		
Turnout		2,042	30.3	
Conservative hold		Swing		
Conservative hold		Swing		

=== Kingsmoor (Whittlesey)) ===
Kingsmoor
Party	Candidate	Votes	%	±%
Conservative	Martin Curtis	unopposed		
Conservative hold		Swing		

=== Kirkgate (Wisbech) ===
Kirkgate
Party	Candidate	Votes	%	±%
Liberal Democrats	David Patrick	311	48.6	
Conservative	Robert Lawrence	233	36.4	
Labour	John White	96	15.0	
Majority		78	12.2	
Turnout		640	35.1	
Liberal Democrats hold		Swing		

=== Lattersey (Whittlesey) ===
Lattersey
Party	Candidate	Votes	%	±%
Conservative	Steve Garratt	453	67.9	
Labour	Jes Hibbert	162	24.3	
Liberal Democrats	Paul Adams	52	7.8	
Majority		291	43.6	
Turnout		667	35.7	
Conservative hold		Swing		

=== Manea ===
Manea
Party	Candidate	Votes	%	±%
Independent	Mark Archer	568	73.9	+12.5
Conservative	James Carney	201	26.1	−12.5
Majority		367	47.7	+24.9
Turnout		769	47.7	−6
Independent hold		Swing		

=== March East ===
March East (3)
Party	Candidate	Votes	%	±%
Conservative	John Clark	1,154		
Conservative	Bernard Keane	1,002		
Conservative	Fred Yeulett	914		
Labour	Martin Field	727		
Labour	Louis Sugden	617		
Labour	John Williams	613		
Independent	Reg Kemp	537		
Turnout		5,564	38.4	+4
Conservative hold		Swing		
Conservative hold		Swing		
Conservative hold		Swing		

=== March North ===
March North (3)
Party	Candidate	Votes	%	±%
Conservative	Mike Cornwell	1,064		
Conservative	Trevor Quince	923		
Conservative	Peter Tunley	827		
Labour	Matthew Routledge	627		
Liberal Democrats	William McAdam	468		
Turnout		3,909	34.8	+6
Conservative hold		Swing		
Conservative hold		Swing		
Conservative hold		Swing		

=== March West ===
March West (3)
Party	Candidate	Votes	%	±%
Conservative	Kit Owen	1,117		
Independent	Rob Skoulding	1,082		
Conservative	Jan French	1,019		
Conservative	Adam Triggs	813		
Independent	Matt Broadfield	483		
Labour	Christopher Carter	472		
Liberal Democrats	Stephen Court	460		
Turnout		5,446	43.3	+11
Conservative hold		Swing		
Independent gain from Conservative		Swing		
Conservative hold		Swing		

=== Medworth (Wisbech) ===
Medworth
Party	Candidate	Votes	%	±%
Conservative	Jonathan Farmer	364	59.1	−5.6
Labour	Mark Plum	194	31.5	−3.8
Liberal Democrats	Christopher Randall	58	9.4	+9.4
Majority		170	27.6	−1.9
Turnout		616	30.5	−2
Conservative hold		Swing		

=== Parson Drove & Wisbech St Mary ===
Parson Drove and Wisbech St Mary (2)
Party	Candidate	Votes	%	±%
Conservative	Robert Scrimshaw	849		
Liberal Democrats	Gavin Booth	652		
Conservative	Steve Tierney	602		
Liberal Democrats	Mary Lane	405		
Labour	David Goode	303		
Turnout		2,811	42.9	
Conservative hold		Swing		
Liberal Democrats gain from Conservative		Swing		

=== Peckover (Wisbech) ===
Peckover
Party	Candidate	Votes	%	±%
Conservative	David Oliver	446	69.8	
Labour	Simon Massen	131	20.5	
Liberal Democrats	Heather Kinnear	62	9.7	
Majority		315	49.3	
Turnout		639	34.5	
Conservative hold		Swing		

=== Roman Bank ===
Roman Bank (3)
Party	Candidate	Votes	%	±%
Conservative	Michael Humphrey	1,256		
Conservative	Philip Hatton	1,092		
Conservative	Chris Seaton	1,007		
Labour	Kay Scott	590		
Liberal Democrats	Nicholas Smith	361		
Turnout		4,306	40.4	
Conservative hold		Swing		
Conservative hold		Swing		
Conservative hold		Swing		

=== Slade Lode ===
Slade Lode
Party	Candidate	Votes	%	±%
Conservative	Florrie Newell	301	46.5	−0.8
Liberal Democrats	Chris Howes	206	31.8	−8.7
Labour	Grant Osbourn	140	21.6	+9.4
Majority		95	14.7	+8.0
Turnout		647	33.3	+2
Conservative hold		Swing		

=== Staithe (Wisbech) ===
Staithe
Party	Candidate	Votes	%	±%
Conservative	Roger Green	301	55.1	
Labour	Reg Mee	157	28.8	
UKIP	Will Schooling	88	16.1	
Majority		144	26.3	
Turnout		546	29.9	
Conservative hold		Swing		

St Andrews
Party	Candidate	Votes	%	±%
Conservative	Derek Stebbing	542	69.0	
Green	David Chivall	243	31.0	
Majority		299	38.0	
Turnout		785	38.3	
Conservative hold		Swing		

St Marys
Party	Candidate	Votes	%	±%
Conservative	Ken Peachey	364	46.0	
Independent	Roy Gerstner	324	40.9	
Green	Hilary Chivall	104	13.1	
Majority		40	5.1	
Turnout		792	39.3	
Conservative hold		Swing		

The Mills

The Mills
Party	Candidate	Votes	%	±%
Conservative	John Chambers	422	57.3	+0.2
Liberal Democrats	Diane Baldry	314	42.7	−0.2
Majority		108	14.7	+0.6
Turnout		736	36.1	+1
Conservative hold		Swing		

Waterlees (2)
Party	Candidate	Votes	%	±%
Independent	Virginia Bucknor	392		
Independent	Michael Bucknor	381		
Conservative	Ray Griffin	298		
Conservative	David Wheeler	285		
Labour	Barry Diggle	186		
Labour	Avis Gilliatt	177		
UKIP	Paul Clapp	165		
UKIP	Christopher Schooling	137		
Liberal Democrats	Christopher Hancox	31		
Turnout		2,052	27.0	−17
Independent gain from Conservative		Swing		
Independent gain from Conservative		Swing		

Wenneye
Party	Candidate	Votes	%	±%
Conservative	Peter Murphy	607	76.5	+8.2
Liberal Democrats	Josie Ratcliffe	186	23.5	−8.2
Majority		421	53.1	+16.4
Turnout		793	39.8	+4
Conservative hold		Swing		

Wimblington
Party	Candidate	Votes	%	±%
Conservative	Pop Jolley	unopposed		
Conservative hold		Swing		
