= 2019 Fenland District Council election =

2019 local election in Fenland, Cambridgeshire, England

- 2 May 2019

All 39 seats to Fenland District Council 20 seats needed for a majority

	First party	Second party
Party	Conservative	Independent
Last election	34 seats, 59.9%	3 seats, 11.0%
Seats won	26	10
Seat change	▼8	▲7
Popular vote	12,972	5,140
Percentage	54.2%	21.5%
Swing	▼5.7%	▲10.5%
	Third party	Fourth party
Party	Liberal Democrats	Green
Last election	2 seats, 5.6%	0 seats, 4.7%
Seats won	2	1
Seat change	Steady	▲1
Popular vote	2,662	1,618
Percentage	11.1%	6.8%
Swing	▲5.5%	▲2.1%
- Winner of each seat at the 2019 Fenland District Council election
Council control before election
Conservative
Council control after election
Conservative

The 2019 Fenland District Council election took place on 2 May 2019 for all 39 seats of the Fenland District Council in England. It was held on the same day as other local elections.

In these elections, twelve councillors were returned unopposed, with Fenland District Council topping the Electoral Reform Society's list of 'rotten boroughs'.

== Summary ==
=== Background ===
In recent months a number of prominent Tories had failed to win selection for wards they had held in many instances for several years. Some of these stood as independent candidates. Nick Meekins standing as an independent took David Oliver's seat. Cllr Michelle Tanfield retained her Elm and Christchurch seat along with Will Sutton as independents.

UKIP did not put up any candidates this election - former UKIP county councillor for Wisbech North ward (2013–2017), Paul Clapp said he felt he could "achieve more outside of the political system than in it". The local Green Party said it had "pushed hard" to field more candidates, but found "limited interest". The Labour candidate Martin Field (March East ward), felt uncontested seats were "bad for democracy". Labour had not a candidate standing in every seat in Fenland since 1995. Liberal Democrat candidate (Parson Drove & Wisbech St Mary), Gavin Booth said: "The state of national politics now puts people off and this has caused a lot of apathy for local politics, which is a shame."

Two Independent councillors Virginia and Michael Bucknor stepped down, after 12 years in local politics, due to Mrs Bucknor's ill health. A former conservative councillor Andy Maul took one of the two seats they were vacating. A number of former Tory councillors standing as independents gained seats across the district, collectively they are forming the largest opposition for many years.

=== Election result ===
2019 Fenland District Council election
Party	Candidates	Seats	Gains	Losses	Net gain/loss	Seats %	Votes %	Votes	+/−
Conservative	39	26	0	8	▼8	66.6	50.1	12,646	–9.8
Independent	15	10	7	0	▲7	25.6	20.4	5,140	+9.4
Liberal Democrats	5	2	1	1	Steady	5.1	10.5	2,662	+4.9
Green	5	1	1	0	▲1	2.7	12.8	3,236	+8.1
Labour	5	0	0	0	Steady	0.0	6.5	1,554	–4.6

== Ward results ==
12 seats were uncontested. (* denotes sitting councillor)

=== Bassenhally (Whittlesey) ===
Bassenhally (2 seats)
Party	Candidate	Votes	%	±%
Conservative	Christopher Boden*	Unopposed	N/A	N/A
Conservative	Kay Mayor*	Unopposed	N/A	N/A
Turnout		N/A	N/A	N/A
Conservative hold		Swing		
Conservative hold		Swing		

=== Benwick, Coates and Eastrea ===
Benwick, Coates and Eastrea (2 seats)
Party	Candidate	Votes	%	±%
Conservative	Alex Miscandlon*	395	39.7	
Independent	Bob Wicks	381	38.3	N/A
Conservative	Graham Costello	372	37.4	
Independent	Maria Goldspink	291	29.3	N/A
Independent	Stephen Goldspink	274	27.6	N/A
Majority		9	0.9	
Turnout		1,026	28.71	
Rejected ballots		32	3.1	
Conservative hold		Swing		
Independent gain from Conservative		Swing		

=== Birch (Chatteris) ===
Birch
Party	Candidate	Votes	%	±%
Conservative	Ian Benney	Unopposed	N/A	N/A
Turnout		N/A	N/A	N/A
Conservative hold		Swing		

=== Clarkson (Wisbech) ===
Clarkson
Party	Candidate	Votes	%	±%
Conservative	Andrew Lynn	Unopposed	N/A	N/A
Turnout		N/A	N/A	
Conservative hold		Swing		

=== Doddington and Wimblington ===
Doddington and Wimblington
Party	Candidate	Votes	%	±%
Conservative	David Connor*	Unopposed	N/A	±0.0
Conservative	Maureen Davis*	Unopposed	N/A	±0.0
Turnout		N/A	N/A	
Conservative hold		Swing		
Conservative hold		Swing		

=== Elm and Christchurch ===
Elm and Christchurch (2 seats)
Party	Candidate	Votes	%	±%
Independent	Will Sutton*	451	46.3	
Independent	Michelle Tanfield*	444	45.5	
Conservative	Phil Webb	291	29.8	
Conservative	Pete Wheeler	282	28.9	
Green	Victoria Bunting	213	21.8	
Majority		153	15.7	
Turnout		1,002	26.25	
Rejected ballots		27	2.7	
Independent gain from Conservative		Swing		
Independent gain from Conservative		Swing		

=== Kirkgate (Wisbech) ===
Kirkgate (1 seat)
Party	Candidate	Votes	%	±%
Independent	David Patrick	230	56.2	N/A
Conservative	Garry Tibbs*	179	43.8	−10.1
Majority		51	12.5	
Turnout		415	22.44	
Rejected ballots		6	1.4	
Independent gain from Conservative		Swing		

=== Lattersey (Whittlesey) ===
Lattersey (1 seat)
Party	Candidate	Votes	%	±%
Conservative	Alan Bristow	407	66.3	+66.3
Labour	Jes Hibbert	207	33.7	N/A
Majority		200	32.6	
Turnout		630	29.28	
Rejected ballots		16	2.5	
Conservative hold		Swing		

=== Manea ===
Manea (1 seat)
Party	Candidate	Votes	%	±%
Independent	Charlie Marks	404	54.2	N/A
Conservative	Emma Kujat	258	34.6	−32.9
Green	Robert White	84	11.3	N/A
Majority		146	19.6	
Turnout		760	37.55	
Rejected ballots		14	1.8	
Independent gain from Conservative		Swing		

=== March East ===
March East (3 seats)
Party	Candidate	Votes	%	±%
Conservative	John Clark*	581	38.6	
Conservative	Mark Purser	520	34.6	
Independent	Fred Yeulett*	514	34.2	
Independent	Andrew Pugh*	485	32.2	
Conservative	Raymond Jack	483	32.1	
Green	Andrew Crawford	408	27.1	N/A
Labour	Martin Field	403	26.8	
Labour	Katharine Bultitude	400	26.6	
Majority		29	1.9	
Turnout		1,520	25.72	
Rejected ballots		15	1.0	
Conservative hold		Swing		
Conservative hold		Swing		
Independent gain from Conservative		Swing		

=== March North ===
March North (3 seats)
Party	Candidate	Votes	%	±%
Independent	Mike Cornwell*	524	42.9	
Conservative	Steve Count*	471	38.6	
Conservative	Kim French	449	36.8	
Green	Ruth Johnson	389	31.9	
Conservative	Peter Thompson	379	31.0	
Liberal Democrats	Stephen Court*	365	29.9	
Liberal Democrats	Silke Ibbotson	295	24.2	
Majority		60	4.9	
Turnout		1,241	22.27	
Rejected ballots		20	1.6	
Independent gain from Liberal Democrats		Swing		
Conservative hold		Swing		
Conservative hold		Swing		

=== March West ===
March West (3 seats)
Party	Candidate	Votes	%	±%
Conservative	Rob Skoulding*	1,008	64.8	
Conservative	Jan French	847	54.5	
Green	Simon Wilkes	524	33.7	
Conservative	Kit Owen*	510	32.8	
Labour	Matthew Routledge	369	23.7	
Majority		14	0.9	
Turnout		1,584	27.47	
Rejected ballots		29	1.8	
Conservative hold		Swing		
Conservative hold		Swing		
Green gain from Independent		Swing		

=== Medworth (Wisbech) ===
Medworth
Party	Candidate	Votes	%	±%
Conservative	Steven Tierney*	Unopposed	N/A	N/A
Turnout		N/A	N/A	
Conservative hold		Swing		

=== Octavia Hill (Wisbech) ===
Octavia Hill (2 seats)
Party	Candidate	Votes	%	±%
Conservative	Samantha Hoy*	639	64.0	
Conservative	Susan Wallwork	487	48.8	
Independent	Peter Freeman	420	42.1	N/A
Labour	Clayton Payne	175	17.5	
Majority		67	6.7	
Turnout		1,007	24.58	
Rejected ballots		9	0.9	
Conservative hold		Swing		
Conservative hold		Swing		

=== Parson Drove and Wisbech St Mary ===
Parson Drove and Wisbech St Mary (2 seats)
Party	Candidate	Votes	%	±%
Liberal Democrats	Gavin Booth*	815	70.1	
Liberal Democrats	Sarah Bligh*	722	62.1	
Conservative	Rita Drinkwater	350	30.1	
Conservative	Dean Rogers	268	23.0	
Majority		372	32.0	
Turnout		1,194	29.20	
Rejected ballots		31	2.6	
Liberal Democrats hold		Swing		
Liberal Democrats gain from Conservative		Swing		

=== Peckover (Wisbech) ===
Peckover (1 seat)
Party	Candidate	Votes	%	±%
Independent	Nick Meekins	292	57.3	+18.3
Conservative	David Oliver*	218	42.7	−18.3
Majority		74	14.5	
Turnout		519	28.19	
Rejected ballots		9	1.7	
Independent gain from Conservative		Swing		

Nick Meekins rejoined the Conservatives in 2021.

=== Roman Bank ===
Roman Bank (3 seats)
Party	Candidate	Votes	%	±%
Conservative	Samantha Clark*	927	65.7	
Conservative	Michael Humphrey*	859	60.8	
Conservative	Chris Seaton*	794	56.2	
Liberal Democrats	Diane Cutler	465	32.9	N/A
Majority		329	23.3	
Turnout		1,487	27.48	
Rejected ballots		75	5.0	
Conservative hold		Swing		
Conservative hold		Swing		
Conservative hold		Swing		

=== Slade Lode (Chatteris) ===
Slade Lode (1 seat)
Party	Candidate	Votes	%	±%
Independent	Daniel Divine	248	60.0	N/A
Conservative	Florence Newell*	165	40.0	+40.0
Majority		83	20.1	
Turnout		422	20.57	
Rejected ballots		9	2.1	
Independent gain from Conservative		Swing		

=== St Andrews (Whittlesey) ===
St Andrews
Party	Candidate	Votes	%	±%
Conservative	David Mason*	Unopposed	N/A	N/A
Turnout		N/A	N/A	
Conservative hold		Swing		

=== Staithe (Wisbech) ===
Staithe
Party	Candidate	Votes	%	±%
Conservative	David Topgood	Unopposed	N/A	N/A
Turnout		N/A	N/A	N/A
Conservative hold		Swing		

=== Stonald (Whittlesey) ===
Stonald (1 seat)
Party	Candidate	Votes	%	±%
Conservative	Denise Laws*	Unopposed	N/A	N/A
Turnout		N/A	N/A	
Conservative hold		Swing		

=== The Mills (Chatteris) ===
The Mills (1 seat)
Party	Candidate	Votes	%	±%
Conservative	Anne Hay	Unopposed	N/A	±0.0
Turnout		N/A	N/A	
Conservative hold		Swing		

=== Waterlees Village (Wisbech) ===
Waterlees Village (2 seats)
Party	Candidate	Votes	%	±%
Conservative	Billy Rackley	449	51.4	
Independent	Andy Maul	440	50.4	N/A
Conservative	Aigars Balsevics	384	44.0	
Independent	Ray Pearson	266	30.5	N/A
Majority		56	6.4	
Turnout		893	22.42	
Rejected ballots		20	2.2	
Conservative gain from Independent		Swing		
Independent gain from Independent		Swing		

=== Wenneye (Chatteris) ===
Wenneye (1 seat)
Party	Candidate	Votes	%	±%
Conservative	Peter Murphy*	Unopposed	N/A	N/A
Turnout		N/A	N/A	
Conservative hold		Swing		

== Changes 2019–2023 ==
- On 19 April 2020, Conservative councillor Alan Bristow, who represented Lattersey, died. A by-election was delayed by the COVID-19 pandemic and held in May 2021.
- In May 2021, Nick Meekins, who had been elected as an independent for Peckover, rejoined the Conservatives.
- In October 2022, Jason Mockett, elected as a Conservative for Lattersey, left the party to sit as an independent; he had rejoined the Conservatives by February 2023.
- In February 2023, John Clark, a former leader of the council who had been elected as a Conservative for March East, left the party to sit as an independent.

=== By-elections ===
==== Lattersey ====
The by-election followed the death of Conservative councillor Alan Bristow.

Lattersey by-election, 6 May 2021
Party	Candidate	Votes	%	±%
Conservative	Jason Mockett	449	62.7	–3.6
Labour	Jes Hibbert	267	37.3	+3.6
Majority		182	25.4	
Turnout		719	33.19	
Rejected ballots		3	0.4	
Conservative hold		Swing	▼3.6	
