= 2023 Fenland District Council election =

- 4 May 2023

All 43 seats to Fenland District Council 22 seats needed for a majority

	First party	Second party
Leader	Chris Boden	Mike Cornwell (defeated)
Party	Conservative	Independent
Last election	26 seats, 50.1%	10 seats, 20.4%
Seats before	26	10
Seats after	35	6
Seat change	▲9	▼4
Popular vote	25,075	7,827
Percentage	56.9%	17.8%
Swing	▲6.8%	▼2.6%
	Third party	Fourth party
Party	Liberal Democrats	Green
Last election	2 seats, 10.5%	1 seat, 12.8%
Seats before	2	1
Seats after	2	0
Seat change	Steady	▼1
Popular vote	2,202	1,942
Percentage	5.0%	4.4%
Swing	▼5.5%	▼8.4%
- Map of the results
Leader before election
Chris Boden
Conservative
Leader after election
Chris Boden
Conservative

The 2023 Fenland District Council election took place on 4 May 2023 to elect members of Fenland District Council in Cambridgeshire, England. This was on the same day as other local elections across England. The Conservatives increased their majority on the council, against the national trend for local elections held on that day, giving the Conservative Party their largest numerical majority of any lower tier principal authority in the country.

== Overview ==
Prior to the election the council had been under Conservative majority control since 1999, and the leader of the council was Chris Boden, who had been in post since 2019. The independent councillors, Liberal Democrats and the Green councillor formed a single political group called the "Fenland Independent Alliance", led by independent councillor Mike Cornwell.

New ward boundaries took effect for this election, increasing the number of seats on the council from 39 to 43.

The Conservatives won 35 of the seats on the council, increasing their majority on the council from 13 to 27. The Green Party lost their only seat on the council, and the opposition group leader, Mike Cornwell, lost his seat by a single vote.

== Overall results ==
Fenland District Council's composition after the 2023 local elections

The overall results were:

2023 Fenland District Council election
Party	Candidates	Seats	Gains	Losses	Net gain/loss	Seats %	Votes %	Votes	+/−
Conservative	43	35	1	0	▲9	81.4	56.9	25,074	+6.8
Independent	19	6	0	1	▼4	14.0	17.8	7,827	–2.6
Liberal Democrats	5	2	0	0	Steady	4.7	5.0	2,202	–5.5
Labour	20	0	0	0	Steady	0.0	14.4	6,326	+7.9
Green	6	0	0	0	▼1	0.0	4.4	1,942	–8.4
Alliance for Democracy and Freedom (UK)	2	0	0	0	Steady	0.0	1.0	424	N/A
Breakthrough Party	1	0	0	0	Steady	0.0	0.3	154	N/A
Reform	1	0	0	0	Steady	0.0	0.3	115	N/A

== Ward results ==
The Statement of Persons Nominated, which details the candidates standing in each ward, was released by Fenland District Council following the close of nominations on 5 April 2023. The results by each ward were as follows, with an asterisk(*) indicating a sitting councillor standing for re-election.

=== Chatteris North & Manea ===
Chatteris North & Manea (3 seats)
Party	Candidate	Votes	%	±%
Conservative	Charlie Marks*	825	56.2	
Conservative	Alan Gowler	701	47.8	
Conservative	James Carney	692	47.2	
Green	Emma Pollard	527	35.9	
Labour	Janet O'Keefe	425	29.0	
Green	Liz Wright	396	27.0	
Majority		165	11.2	
Turnout		1,471	25.48	
Rejected ballots		4	0.3	
Conservative win (new seat)				
Conservative win (new seat)				
Conservative win (new seat)				

=== Chatteris South ===
Chatteris South (3 seats)
Party	Candidate	Votes	%	±%
Conservative	Ian Benney*	578	48.0	
Conservative	Peter Murphy*	517	42.9	
Conservative	Anne Hay*	509	42.2	
Independent	Daniel Divine*	383	31.8	
Labour	Amanda Hirson	307	25.5	
Independent	Aurelia Stempien-Wyrwal	296	24.6	
Green	Steven Chappell	286	23.7	
Breakthrough Party	Matt Jeal	154	12.8	
Majority		126	10.5	
Turnout		1,208	25.92	
Rejected ballots		3	0.2	
Conservative win (new seat)				
Conservative win (new seat)				
Conservative win (new seat)				

=== Doddington & Wimblington ===
Doddington & Wimblington (2 seats)
Party	Candidate	Votes	%	±%
Conservative	Maureen Davis*	732	60.5	
Conservative	David Connor*	708	58.6	
Labour	Katie Clark	256	21.2	
Labour	Philip Snowdon	246	20.3	
Liberal Democrats	Liam O'Rourke	218	18.0	
Majority		452	37.4	
Turnout		1,217	30.90	
Rejected ballots		8	0.7	
Conservative hold		Swing		
Conservative hold		Swing		

=== Elm & Christchurch ===
Elm & Christchurch (2 seats)
Party	Candidate	Votes	%	±%
Independent	Matthew Summers	447	45.7	
Independent	Dal Roy	402	41.1	
Conservative	Petya Kneksis	396	40.5	
Conservative	Boryana Pehlivanova	317	32.4	
Labour	Marian Phillips	211	21.6	
Majority		6	0.6	
Turnout		980	25.11	
Rejected ballots		2	0.2	
Independent hold		Swing		
Independent hold		Swing		

=== Leverington & Wisbech Rural ===
Leverington & Wisbech Rural (3 seats)
Party	Candidate	Votes	%	±%
Conservative	Samantha Clark*	926	59.9	
Conservative	Chris Seaton*	889	57.5	
Conservative	Brenda Barber	818	52.9	
Labour	Benedict Allen	406	26.3	
ADF	Hermien Dyer	215	13.9	
ADF	Mark Dyer	209	13.5	
Independent	Charles Cutler	167	10.8	
Majority		412	26.6	
Turnout		1,554	30.07	
Rejected ballots		8	0.5	
Conservative win (new seat)				
Conservative win (new seat)				
Conservative win (new seat)				

=== March East ===
March East (3 seats)
Party	Candidate	Votes	%	±%
Independent	John Clark*	604	41.4	
Conservative	Mark Purser*	555	38.0	
Conservative	Stuart Harris	509	34.9	
Conservative	Levent Ali	477	32.7	
Independent	Jennifer Lawler	455	31.2	
Labour	Martin Field	445	30.5	
Labour	Angela Mayes	419	28.7	
Labour	Katharine Bultitude	410	28.1	
Majority		32	2.2	
Turnout		1,463	28.28	
Rejected ballots		4	0.3	
Independent hold		Swing		
Conservative hold		Swing		
Conservative gain from Independent		Swing		

John Clark was elected in 2019 as a Conservative, but had left the party to sit as an independent in February 2023.

=== March North ===
March North (3 seats)
Party	Candidate	Votes	%	±%
Conservative	Steve Count*	563	33.5	
Conservative	Kim French*	558	33.2	
Independent	Paul Hicks	553	32.9	
Independent	Mike Cornwell*	552	32.9	
Labour	Hannah Orbell	471	28.1	
Conservative	Ashley Smith	447	26.6	
Labour	Martyn Balmont	392	23.3	
Labour	George Broughton	372	22.2	
Liberal Democrats	Stephen Court	319	19.0	
Reform	David Maryan	115	6.8	
Majority		1	0.1	
Turnout		1,697	28.29	
Rejected ballots		18	1.1	
Conservative hold		Swing		
Conservative hold		Swing		
Independent hold		Swing		

=== March South ===
March South (2 seats)
Party	Candidate	Votes	%	±%
Conservative	Jan French*	416	51.7	
Conservative	Gary Christy	409	50.8	
Labour	Clare Hale	263	32.7	
Labour	Robert Williams	207	25.7	
Green	Simon Wilkes*	174	21.6	
Majority		146	18.1	
Turnout		806	26.76	
Rejected ballots		1	0.1	
Conservative win (new seat)				
Conservative win (new seat)				

=== March West & Benwick ===
March West & Benwick (2 seats)
Party	Candidate	Votes	%	±%
Conservative	Andrew Woollard	549	59.0	
Conservative	Tim Taylor	533	57.3	
Labour	Stewart Hearn	359	38.6	
Majority		174	18.7	
Turnout		943	25.11	
Rejected ballots		13	1.4	
Conservative win (new seat)				
Conservative win (new seat)				

=== Parson Drove & Wisbech St Mary ===
Parson Drove & Wisbech St Mary (3 seats)
Party	Candidate	Votes	%	±%
Liberal Democrats	Gavin Booth*	706	50.8	
Conservative	Michael Humphrey*	688	49.5	
Liberal Democrats	Diane Cutler	617	44.4	
Conservative	Anthony Georgiou	552	39.7	
Conservative	Clayton Payne	495	35.6	
Liberal Democrats	Rasa McGill	342	24.6	
Labour	Sebastian O'Keefe	194	14.0	
Majority		65	4.7	
Turnout		1,402	26.77	
Rejected ballots		12	0.9	
Liberal Democrats hold		Swing		
Liberal Democrats hold		Swing		
Conservative win (new seat)				

=== Whittlesey East & Villages ===
Whittlesey East & Villages (3 seats)
Party	Candidate	Votes	%	±%
Conservative	Chris Boden*	698	53.9	
Conservative	Alex Miscandlon*	631	48.8	
Conservative	Haq Nawaz	579	44.7	
Independent	Bob Wicks*	520	40.2	
Green	David Habbin	312	24.1	
Labour	Stephen Clay	302	23.3	
Majority		59	4.6	
Turnout		1,299	25.92	
Rejected ballots		5	0.4	
Conservative win (new seat)				
Conservative win (new seat)				
Conservative win (new seat)				

=== Whittlesey Lattersey ===
Whittlesey Lattersey
Party	Candidate	Votes	%	±%
Conservative	Jason Mockett*	190	61.3	
Labour	Ian Moyes	120	38.7	
Majority		70	22.6	
Turnout		312	24.51	
Rejected ballots		2	0.6	
Conservative hold		Swing		

=== Whittlesey North West ===
Whittlesey North West (2 seats)
Party	Candidate	Votes	%	±%
Conservative	Dee Laws*	689	69.9	
Conservative	Elisabeth Sennitt Clough	597	60.5	
Labour	Peter Gilman	266	27.0	
Green	John Male	247	25.1	
Majority		331	33.6	
Turnout		988	25.95	
Rejected ballots		2	0.2	
Conservative win (new seat)				
Conservative win (new seat)				

=== Whittlesey South ===
Whittlesey South (2 seats)
Party	Candidate	Votes	%	±%
Conservative	Kay Mayor*	537	51.1	
Independent	Roy Gerstner	472	45.0	
Conservative	Maria Boccia	432	41.1	
Independent	Peter Bibb	337	32.1	
Majority		40	3.8	
Turnout		1,056	28.90	
Rejected ballots		6	0.6	
Conservative win (new seat)				
Independent win (new seat)				

=== Wisbech North ===
Wisbech North
Party	Candidate	Votes	%	±%
Conservative	Lucie Foice-Beard	198	60.2	
Independent	Alan Wheeldon	96	29.2	
Independent	Marina Jennings	35	10.6	
Majority		102	31.0	
Turnout		336	17.01	
Rejected ballots		7	2.1	
Conservative win (new seat)				

=== Wisbech Riverside ===
Wisbech Riverside (2 seats)
Party	Candidate	Votes	%	±%
Conservative	Nick Meekins*	447	61.8	
Conservative	Dave Oliver	400	55.3	
Labour	Kathryn Hearn	255	35.3	
Majority		145	20.1	
Turnout			19.85	
Rejected ballots		14	1.9	
Conservative win (new seat)				
Conservative win (new seat)				

Nick Meekins had stood unsuccessfully for UKIP in 2015 and had been elected in 2019 as an independent, but had rejoined the Conservatives in 2021.

=== Wisbech South ===
Wisbech South (3 seats)
Party	Candidate	Votes	%	±%
Conservative	Samantha Hoy*	859	62.8	
Conservative	Steve Tierney*	823	60.2	
Conservative	Susan Wallwork*	792	58.0	
Independent	Ruth Freeman	496	36.3	
Independent	Peter Freeman	491	35.9	
Majority		296	21.6	
Turnout		1,379	24.70	
Rejected ballots		11	0.8	
Conservative win (new seat)				
Conservative win (new seat)				
Conservative win (new seat)				

=== Wisbech Walsoken & Waterlees ===
Wisbech Walsoken & Waterlees (3 seats)
Party	Candidate	Votes	%	±%
Conservative	Sidney Imafidon	656	49.5	
Conservative	Billy Rackley*	638	48.2	
Independent	David Patrick*	557	42.0	
Conservative	Sylwia Salvidge	549	41.4	
Independent	Garry Monger	523	39.5	
Independent	Simon Crowson	441	33.3	
Majority		8	0.6	
Turnout		1,341	25.24	
Rejected ballots		16	1.2	
Conservative win (new seat)				
Conservative win (new seat)				
Independent win (new seat)				

== Changes 2023–2027 ==
=== By-elections ===
==== Whittlesey South ====
Conservative councillor Kay Mayor, who had served since 2007, stood down in June 2024, prompting this by-election.

Whittlesey South by-election, 4 July 2024
Party	Candidate	Votes	%	±%
Conservative	Gurninder Gill	988	47.0	–16.4
Independent	Martin Curtis	841	40.0	N/A
Workers Party	Clayton Payne	274	13.0	N/A
Majority		147	7.0	N/A
Turnout		2,160	58.21	+29.3
Rejected ballots		57	2.6	
Conservative hold				

==== Whittlesey North West ====
The by-election was called after the resignation of Conservative councillor Elisabeth Sennitt Clough.

Whittlesey North West by-election, 23 October 2025
Party	Candidate	Votes	%	±%
Conservative	Alec Branton	483	47.5	–9.8
Reform	Kevin Marston	346	34.1	N/A
Independent	Martin Curtis	127	12.5	N/A
Labour	Theresa Okogwa	60	5.9	–16.2
Majority		137	13.5	N/A
Turnout		1,022	27.26	+1.3
Rejected ballots		6	0.6	
Conservative hold				
