= 2003 Fenland District Council election =

Election in England

- 1 May 2003

All 40 seats to Fenland District Council

	First party	Second party	Third party
Party	Conservative	Liberal Democrats	Labour
Last election	? seats, ?%	? seats, ?%	? seats, ?%
	Fourth party
Party	Independent
Council control before election
Conservative
Council control after election
Conservative

Map of the results of the 2003 Fenland council election. Conservatives in blue, Labour in red and independent in grey.

The 2003 Fenland District Council election took place on 1 May 2003 to elect members of Fenland District Council in Cambridgeshire, England. The whole council was up for election with boundary changes since the last election in 1999. The Conservative Party stayed in overall control of the council.

== Election result ==
The results saw the Conservatives easily stay in control of the council taking 36 of the 40 seats, with Conservative candidates having been unopposed in 11 wards. The only ward where any other group won all of the seats was in Waterlees in Wisbech, where Labour took both seats.

Fenland local election result 2003
Party	Seats	Gains	Losses	Net gain/loss	Seats %	Votes %	Votes	+/−
Conservative	36	-	-	+7	90.0	67.5	13,088	
Labour	3	-	-	-4	7.5	21.7	4,209	
Independent	1	-	-	-2	2.5	6.7	1,306	
Liberal Democrats	0	-	-	-1	0	2.9	567	
Green	0	-	-	0	0	1.1	223	

14 Conservative candidates were unopposed at the election.

== Ward results ==
Bassenhally (Whittlesey)
Party	Candidate	Votes	%
Conservative	Kenneth Mayor	unopposed	
Conservative win (new seat)			

Benwick, Coates and Eastrea (2 seats)
Party	Candidate	Votes	%
Conservative	Thomas Butcher	unopposed	
Conservative	Pamela Potts	unopposed	
Conservative win (new seat)			
Conservative win (new seat)			

Birch (Chatteris)
Party	Candidate	Votes	%
Conservative	Alan Melton	304	66.5
Labour	David Biggs	153	33.5
Majority		151	33.0
Turnout		457	28.7
Conservative win (new seat)			

Clarkson (Wisbech)
Party	Candidate	Votes	%
Conservative	Carol Cox	245	64.6
Labour	Ann Purt	134	35.4
Majority		111	29.2
Turnout		379	23.9
Conservative win (new seat)			

Delph
Party	Candidate	Votes	%
Conservative	Denise Laws	unopposed	
Conservative win (new seat)			

Doddington
Party	Candidate	Votes	%
Conservative	Geoffrey Harper	unopposed	
Conservative win (new seat)			

Elm and Christchurch (2 seats)
Party	Candidate	Votes	%	±%
Conservative	Malcolm Cotterell	550		
Conservative	Evelyn Green	486		
Independent	Phillip Webb	368		
Turnout		1,404	27.2	

Hill (Wisbech) (2 seats)
Party	Candidate	Votes	%
Conservative	Simon King	621	
Conservative	Henry Wegg	574	
Labour	Lewis Purt	258	
Turnout		1,453	25.4
Conservative win (new seat)			
Conservative win (new seat)			

Kingsmoor (Whittlesey)
Party	Candidate	Votes	%	±%
Conservative	Martin Curtis	239	57.6	
Labour	Douglas Costain	176	42.4	
Majority		63	15.2	
Turnout		415	32.1	

Kirkgate (Wisbech)
Party	Candidate	Votes	%
Conservative	Leslie Sims	245	66.9
Labour	Ronald Harris	121	33.1
Majority		124	33.8
Turnout		366	21.6
Conservative win (new seat)			

Lattersey
Party	Candidate	Votes	%
Conservative	Stephen Garratt	unopposed	
Conservative win (new seat)			

Manea
Party	Candidate	Votes	%	±%
Conservative	Paul Jolley	unopposed		

March East (3 seats)
Party	Candidate	Votes	%	±%
Conservative	Bernard Keane	805		
Conservative	Frederick Yeulett	674		
Labour	Barry Howlett	672		
Labour	Barry Wales	662		
Conservative	Leon Hyde	624		
Labour	Martin Field	509		
Green	Christopher Bennett	223		
Turnout		4,169	29.0	

March North (3 seats)
Party	Candidate	Votes	%	±%
Independent	Patricia Brewin	716		
Conservative	Trevor Quince	641		
Conservative	John West	633		
Conservative	Kimberley French	612		
Turnout		2,602	24.1	

March West (3 seats)
Party	Candidate	Votes	%	±%
Conservative	Janet French	unopposed		
Conservative	Christopher Owen	unopposed		
Conservative	Peter Skoulding	unopposed		

Medworth (Wisbech)
Party	Candidate	Votes	%
Conservative	Jonathon Farmer	unopposed	
Conservative win (new seat)			

Parson Drove and Wisbech St Mary (2 seats)
Party	Candidate	Votes	%	±%
Conservative	Cyril Bellamy	683		
Conservative	Clifford Edwards	630		
Labour	John Cook	264		
Turnout		1,577	29.7	

Peckover (Wisbech)
Party	Candidate	Votes	%
Conservative	Elizabeth Carlisle	295	77.2
Labour	Simon Massen	87	22.8
Majority		208	54.4
Turnout		382	22.9
Conservative win (new seat)			

Roman Bank (3 seats)
Party	Candidate	Votes	%
Conservative	Michael Humphrey	851	
Conservative	Brian Hardy	849	
Conservative	Peter Ward	810	
Labour	Richard Hibbert	329	
Turnout		2,839	27.8
Conservative win (new seat)			
Conservative win (new seat)			
Conservative win (new seat)			

Slade Lode
Party	Candidate	Votes	%
Conservative	Peter Dickinson	165	39.4
Liberal Democrats	Christopher Howes	129	30.8
Labour	Grant Osbourn	125	29.8
Majority		36	8.6
Turnout		419	25.6
Conservative win (new seat)			

St Andrews
Party	Candidate	Votes	%
Conservative	Ronald Speechley	unopposed	
Conservative win (new seat)			

St Marys
Party	Candidate	Votes	%
Conservative	Ursula Cuffe	unopposed	
Conservative win (new seat)			

Staithe (Wisbech)
Party	Candidate	Votes	%
Conservative	Anthony Green	unopposed	
Conservative win (new seat)			

The Mills
Party	Candidate	Votes	%
Conservative	Albert German	360	61.9
Independent	Stephen Wilson	222	38.1
Majority		138	23.8
Turnout		582	31.1
Conservative win (new seat)			

Waterlees (Wisbech) (2 seats)
Party	Candidate	Votes	%
Labour	Stephen Cawthorne	317	
Labour	Avis Gilliatt	297	
Conservative	Yvonne Lawrence	230	
Conservative	Susanah Farmer	192	
Liberal Democrats	Paul Clapp	162	
Turnout		1,198	17.7
Labour win (new seat)			
Labour win (new seat)			

Wenneye
Party	Candidate	Votes	%
Conservative	Peter Murphy	353	56.1
Liberal Democrats	Florence Newell	276	43.9
Majority		77	12.2
Turnout		629	35.1
Conservative win (new seat)			

Wimblington
Party	Candidate	Votes	%	±%
Conservative	Jillian Tuck	417	79.9	
Labour	Claire Osbourn	105	20.1	
Majority		312	59.8	
Turnout		522	37.4	
