= Fenland District =

Non-metropolitan district in Cambridgeshire, England

Coordinates: 52.575°N 0.049°E

- Non-metropolitan district
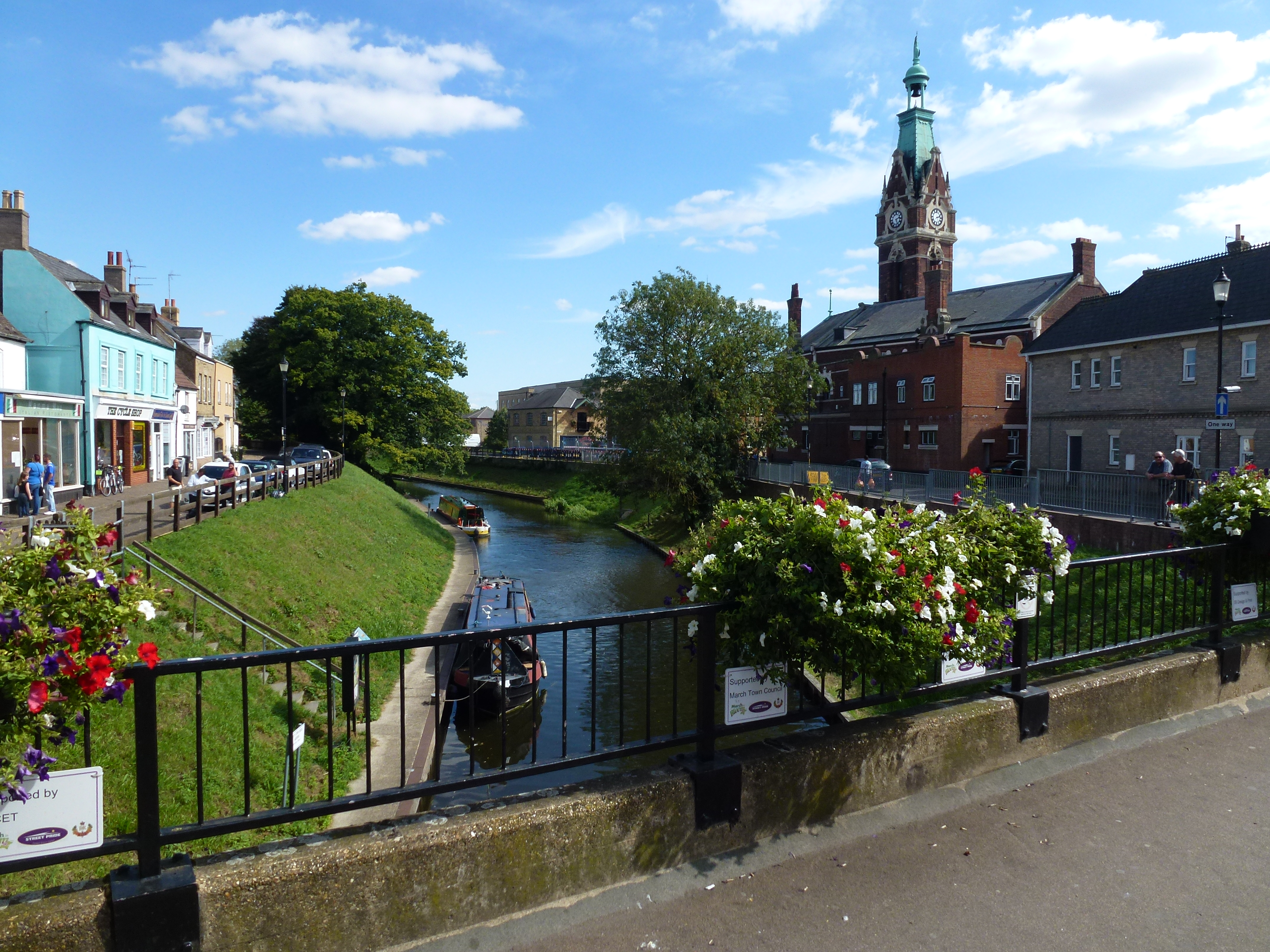
- March town centre

- Fenland shown within Cambridgeshire
- Sovereign state: United Kingdom
- Constituent country: England
- Region: East of England
- Non-metropolitan county: Cambridgeshire
- Status: Non-metropolitan district
- Admin HQ: Fenland Hall, March
- Incorporated: 1 April 1974

Government
  - Type: Non-metropolitan district council
  - Body: Fenland District Council
  - MP: Steve Barclay (C)

Area
  - Total: 210.99 sq mi (546.45 km^{2})
  - Rank: 72nd (of 296)

Population (2025)
  - Total: 105,930
  - Rank: 236th (of 296)
  - Density: 502.07/sq mi (193.85/km^{2})

Ethnicity (2021)
  - Ethnic groups: List: 95.9% White; 1.4% Mixed; 1.2% Asian; 0.8% Black; 0.7% other

Religion (2021)
  - Religion: List: 52.1% Christianity; 39.9% no religion; 7.3% other; 0.7% Islam
- Time zone: UTC0 (GMT)
  - Summer (DST): UTC+1 (BST)
- ONS code: 12UD (ONS); E07000010 (GSS)
- OS grid reference: TL417969

Fenland is a local government district in Cambridgeshire, England. It was historically part of the Isle of Ely. The district covers around 500 square kilometres (190 sq mi) of mostly agricultural land in the extremely flat Fens. The council is based in Fenland Hall, in March. Other towns include Chatteris, Whittlesey and Wisbech, the largest of the four.

Since 2017 the district has been a constituent member of the Cambridgeshire and Peterborough Combined Authority, led by the directly-elected Mayor of Cambridgeshire and Peterborough.

The neighbouring districts are East Cambridgeshire, Huntingdonshire, Peterborough, South Holland and King's Lynn and West Norfolk.

== History ==
The district was formed on 1 April 1974 under the Local Government Act 1972. The new district covered the area of six former districts, which were all abolished at the same time:

- Chatteris Urban District
- March Urban District
- North Witchford Rural District
- Wisbech Municipal Borough
- Wisbech Rural District
- Whittlesey Urban District

The new district was named Fenland, referencing its position within the Fens.

== Governance ==
Fenland District Council

Type
- Type: Non-metropolitan district

Leadership
- Chair: Brenda Barber, Conservative since 19 May 2025
- Leader: Chris Boden, Conservative since 23 May 2019
- Chief Executive: Paul Medd since October 2011

Structure
- Seats: 43 councillors
- Graph of the party split among 43 seats.
- Political groups: Administration (35) Conservative (35) Other parties (8) Independent (6) Liberal Democrats (2)

Elections
- Voting system: First-past-the-post
- Last election: 4 May 2023
- Next election: 2027

Meeting place
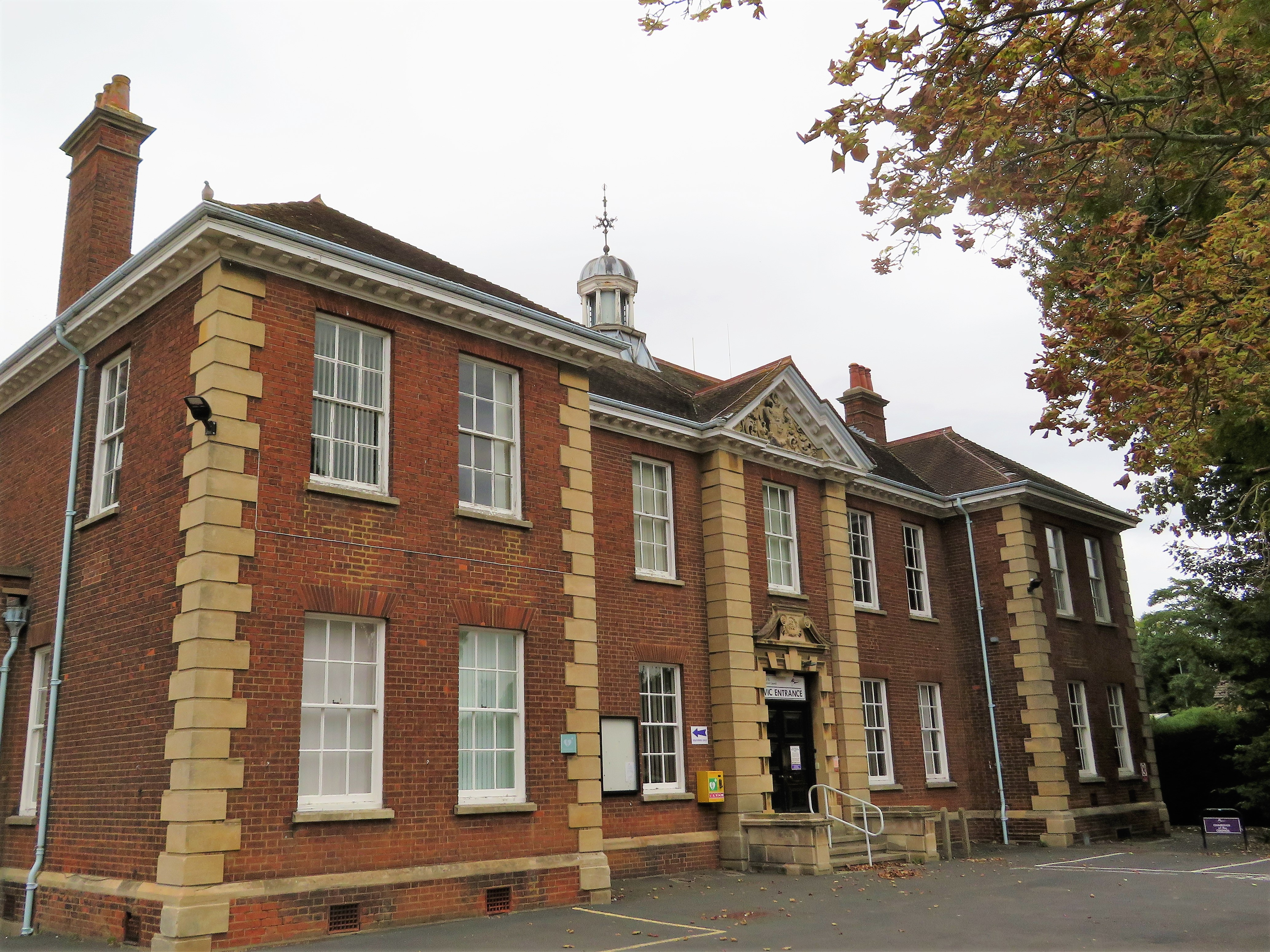
- Fenland Hall, County Road, March, PE15 8NQ

Website
- www.fenland.gov.uk

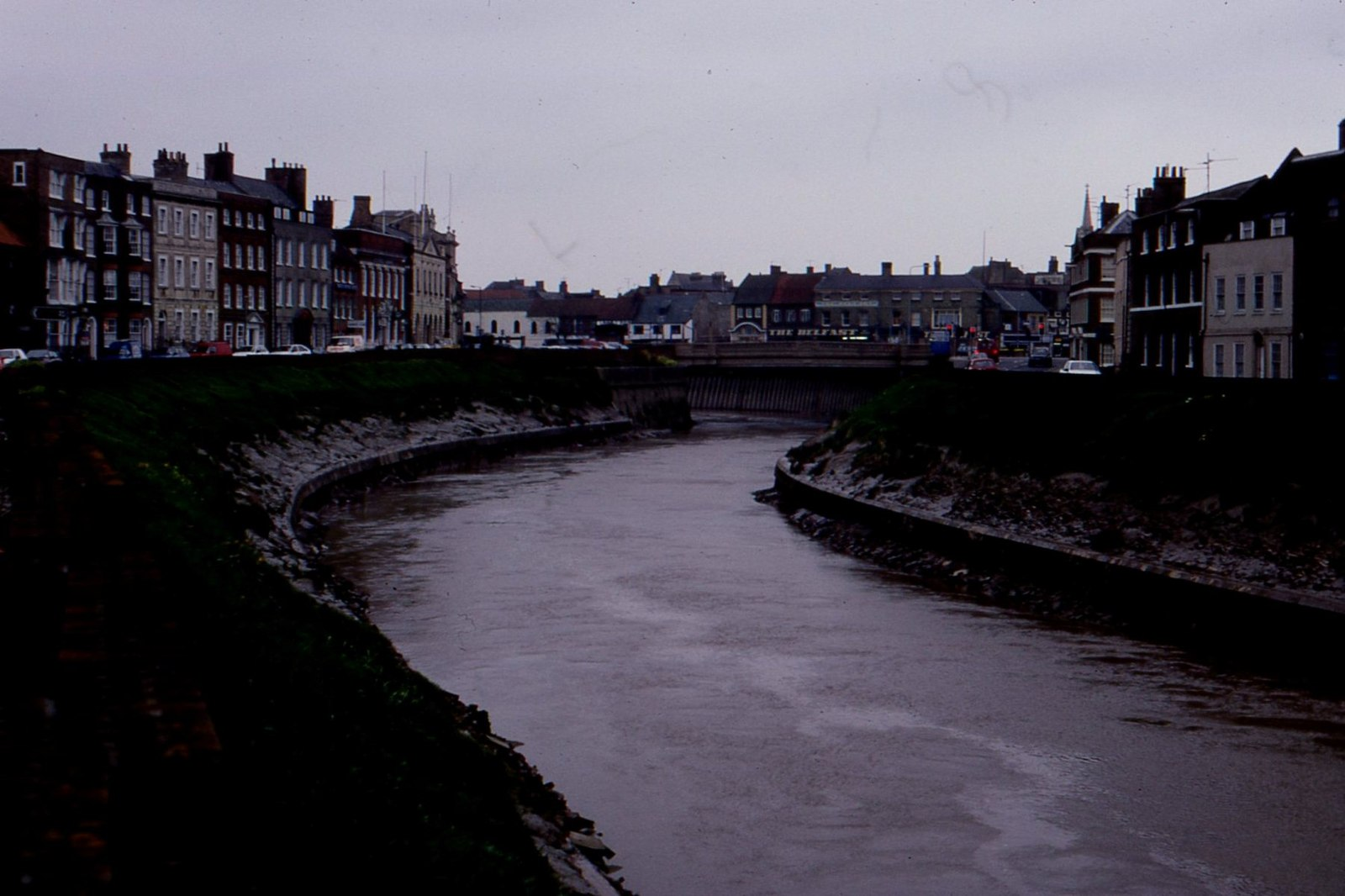
Wisbech, known as the "Capital of the Fens" is the largest settlement in the district

Fenland District Council provides district-level services. County-level services are provided by Cambridgeshire County Council. The whole district is also covered by civil parishes, which form a third tier of local government.

=== Political control ===
The council has been under Conservative control since 1999.

The first election to the council was held in 1973, initially operating as a shadow authority alongside the outgoing authorities until the new arrangements came into effect on 1 April 1974. Political control of the council since 1974 has been as follows:

Party in control	Years
No overall control	1974–1976
Conservative	1976–1995
Labour	1995–1999
Conservative	1999–present

=== Leadership ===
The leaders of the council since 2014 have been:

Councillor	Party	From	To
Alan Melton	Conservative		8 May 2014
John Clark	Conservative	8 May 2014	12 Jan 2018
Chris Seaton	Conservative	22 Feb 2018	23 May 2019
Chris Boden	Conservative	23 May 2019	

=== Composition ===
Following the 2023 election, the composition of the council was:

Party	Councillors
Conservative	35
Independent	6
Liberal Democrats	2
Total	43

The next election is due in 2027.

=== Elections ===
Since the last boundary changes in 2023, the council has comprised 43 councillors representing 18 wards, with each ward electing one, two or three councillors. Elections are held every four years.

In the 2019 election, twelve councillors – all Conservative – were returned unopposed to Fenland District Council, which topped the Electoral Reform Society's list of 'rotten boroughs'.

=== Premises ===
The council is based at Fenland Hall in March. The opening ceremony for the original building was held on 28 July 1909 as the county hall for the former Isle of Ely County Council.

== Parishes ==
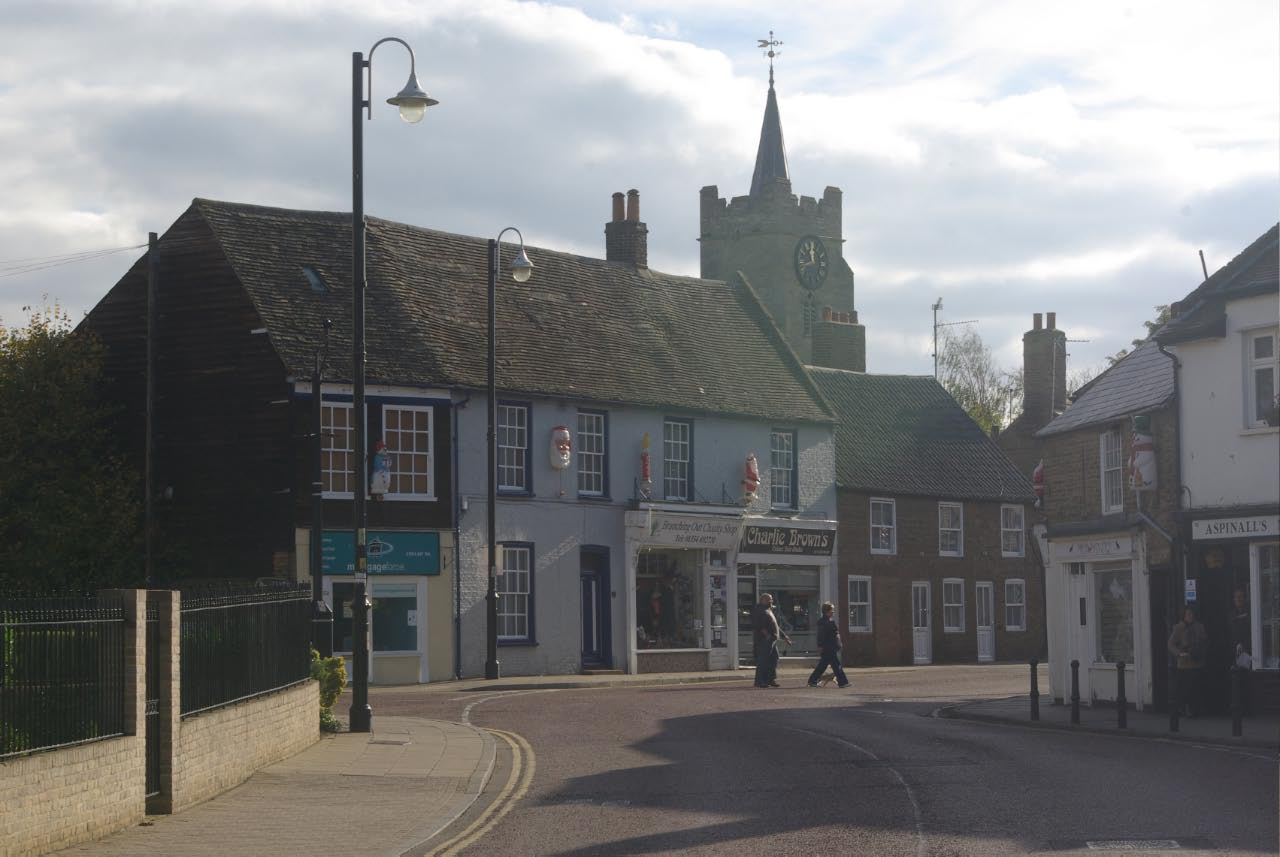
Chatteris, one of the Fenland market towns

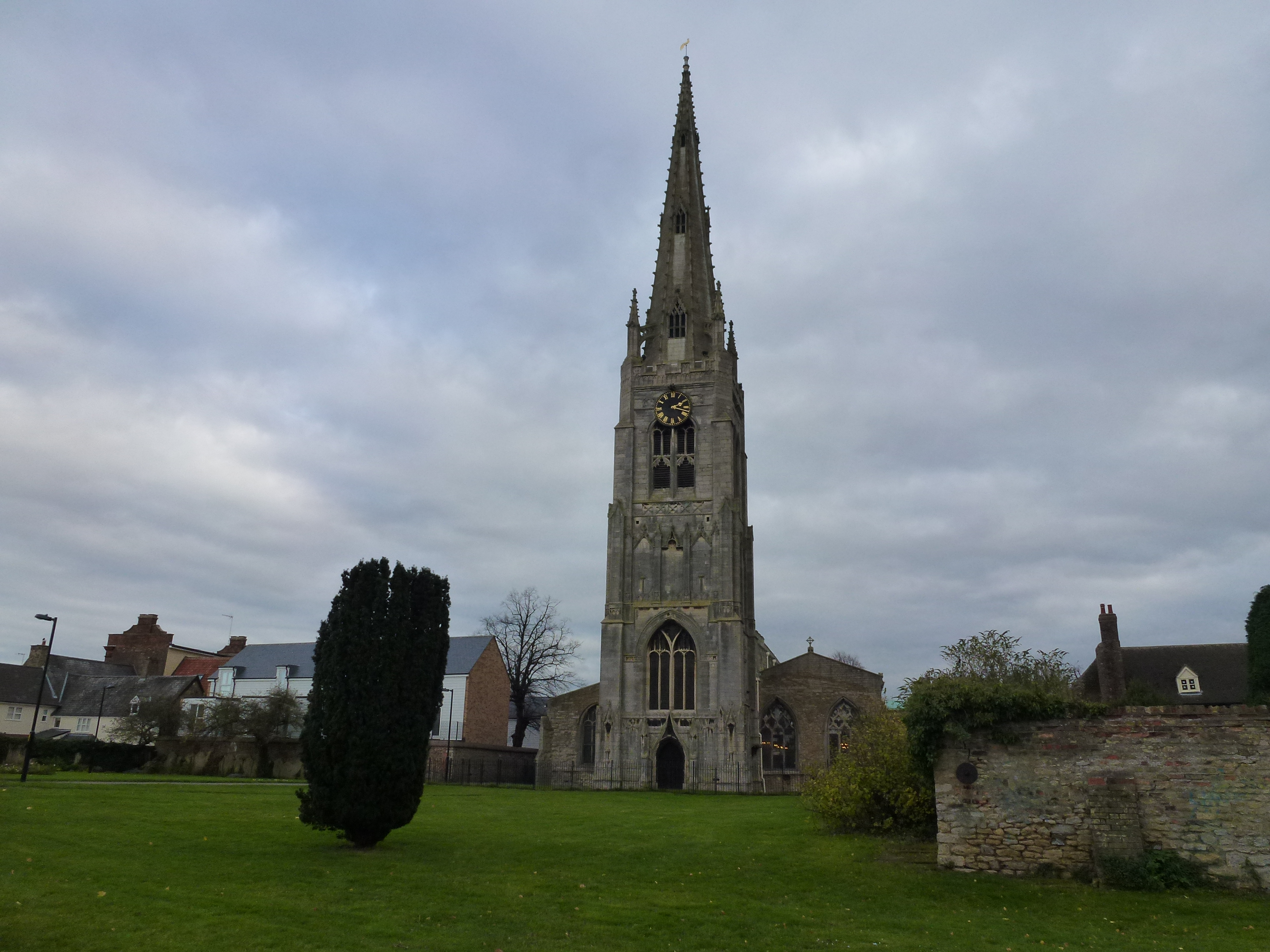
Whittlesey, one of the Fenland market towns

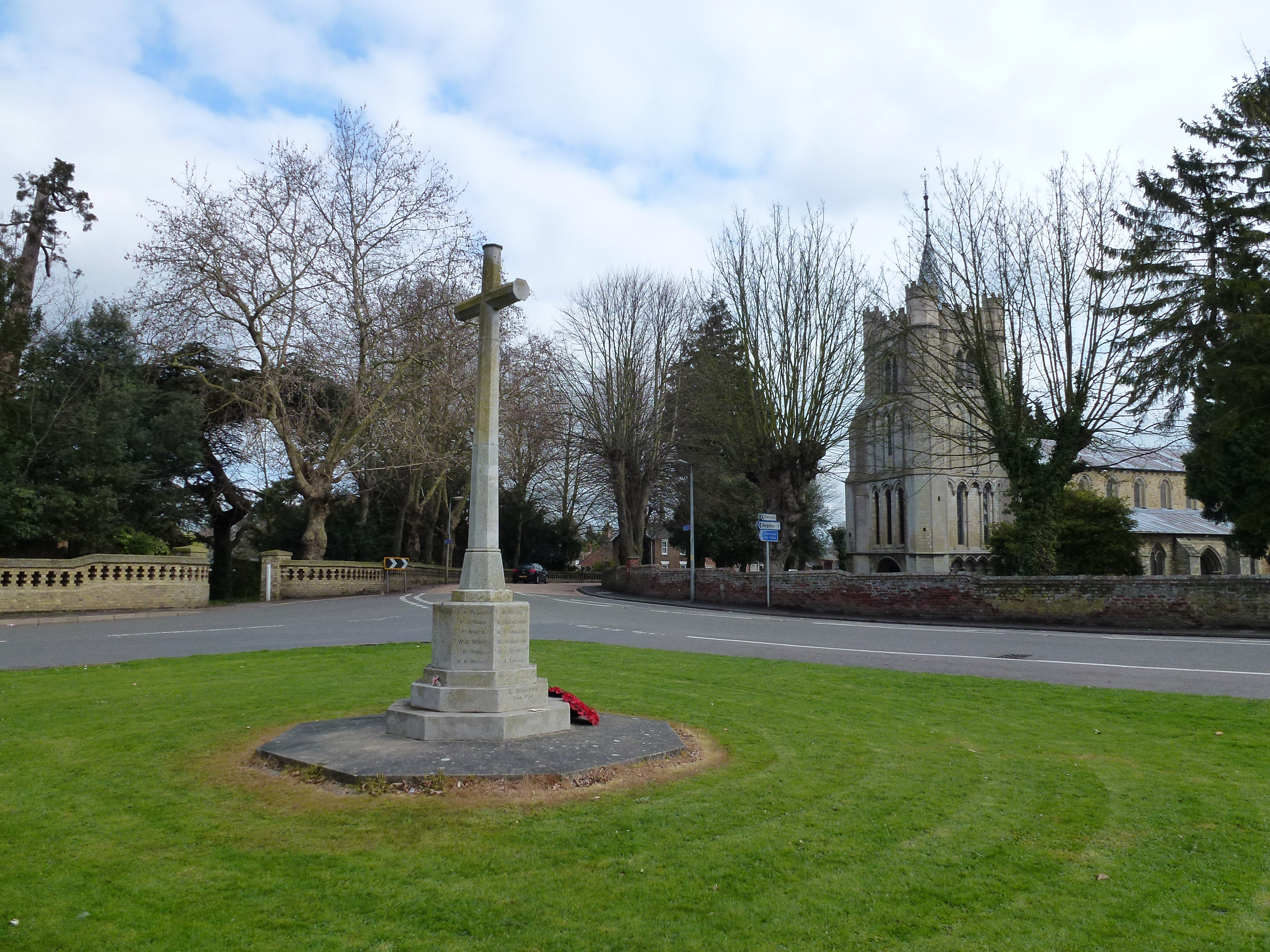
Elm, one of the many Fenland villages.

The whole district is divided into 16 civil parishes. The parish councils for Chatteris, March, Whittlesey and Wisbech take the style "town council".

- Benwick
- Chatteris (town)
- Christchurch
- Doddington
- Elm
- Gorefield
- Leverington
- Manea
- March (town)
- Newton-in-the-Isle
- Parson Drove
- Tydd St Giles
- Whittlesey (town)
- Wimblington
- Wisbech (town)
- Wisbech St Mary

== Economy ==
The local economy has traditionally been built upon farming and other food-related industries. The food industry is well-established, and related processing, storage, packaging and distribution have become more sophisticated and diverse. The predominantly rural economy of the area also includes a strong industrial tradition, including brewing, brick making, can making, pet food production, printing and engineering, and many local residents commute outside the district to work or study. The River Nene provides access to the sea via the Port of Wisbech. Other waterways provide opportunities for angling and other water based activities. Marinas are located in Wisbech and March.

The council run markets in three of the towns (the market in Wisbech is run by Wisbech Town Council) and a number of festivals and other events.

A proposal for a new Fenland rail link was agreed in June 2020.

Fenland council handed £370,400 to its chief executive, Tim Pilsbury, when he took early retirement in 2010–11.

== Awareness and promotion ==
The term "Fen Tiger" is associated with the Fens. A flag with a tiger emblazoned on it is now representative of this part of the county.

A number of organisations such as the Fenland Archaeological Society (FenArch) and publications such as the Fenland Citizen and The Fens magazine cover much or all of the district. The Wisbech & Fenland Museum for many years was the only museum covering the area. However, the district council ceased funding the museum in 2016.

== Fenland Poet Laureate ==
Since 2012, local poets have been eligible for the Fenland Poet Laureate award. Laureates include:

- Elaine Ewart (2012)
- Leanne Moden (2013)
- Poppy Kleiser (2014)
- Jonathan Totman (2015)
- Mary Livingstone (2016)
- Kate Caoimhe Arthur (2017)
- CJ Atkinson (2019)
- Kim Allen (2020, 2021)
- Qu Gao (2022)
- Hannah Teasdale (2024)
- Felix Dawson (2025)

== Twin towns and sister cities ==
Fenland is twinned with:

- Nettetal, North Rhine-Westphalia, Germany
- Cook County, New Zealand
- Sunshine Coast, Australia

== See also ==
- Fenland Survey
- The Fens
