= Grade II* listed buildings in East Cambridgeshire =

There are over 20,000 Grade II* listed buildings in England. This page is a list of these buildings in the district of East Cambridgeshire in Cambridgeshire.

== List ==
Name	Location	Type	Completed (Note: The date given is the date used by Historic England as significant for the initial building or that of an important part in the structure's description.)	Date designated	Grid ref. (Note: The grid reference is based on the British national grid reference system, sometimes known as OSGB36, used by the Ordnance Survey.) Geo-coordinates	Entry number (Note: The "List Entry Number" is a unique number assigned to each listed building and scheduled monument by Historic England.)	Image
Parish Church of St Mary	Brinkley	Parish church	13th century	19 August 1951	TL6294854831; 52°10′04″N 0°22′52″E	1331800	Parish Church of St Mary More images
Church of St Augustine	Burrough Green	Parish church	13th century	19 August 1959	TL6353255443; 52°10′23″N 0°23′24″E	1318128	Church of St Augustine More images
Six Mile Bottom Windmill	Bungalow Hill, Burrough Green	Post mill	Rebuilt 1846	20 February 1980	TL5882258183; 52°11′56″N 0°19′21″E	1126339	Six Mile Bottom Windmill More images
Isacsons	Burwell	House	Early to mid-14th century	19 August 1959	TL5907665913; 52°16′06″N 0°19′47″E	1160982	Isacsons
Stevens Mill	Burwell	Tower mill	Early 19th century	1 December 1951	TL5902466413; 52°16′22″N 0°19′45″E	1126407	Stevens Mill More images
Lodges, gateway and railings to south of Chippenham Park	Chippenham Park, Chippenham	Gate lodge	c.1745	2 April 1976	TL6635768199; 52°17′12″N 0°26′15″E	1126376	Upload Photo
Stable block	Chippenham Park, Chippenham	Workshop	Late 17th century	1 December 1951	TL6647969438; 52°17′52″N 0°26′24″E	1126375	Upload Photo
The School House	Chippenham	House	Late 17th century	1 December 1951	TL6627069763; 52°18′03″N 0°26′13″E	1126377	The School House More images
Mansion Farmhouse	Coveney	Farmhouse	Late 16th century	5 February 1952	TL4898582256; 52°25′05″N 0°11′21″E	1127005	Mansion Farmhouse More images
Barn to east of Tower Farmhouse	Downham	Barn	1486–1500	5 February 1952	TL5187884172; 52°26′04″N 0°13′58″E	1310362	Upload Photo
Hundred Foot Pumping Station	Pymore, Downham	Boiler house	1830	26 February 1985	TL5076489150; 52°28′46″N 0°13′07″E	1160847	Hundred Foot Pumping Station More images
Outbuilding to west of Tower Farmhouse	Downham	Farmhouse	1486–1500	5 February 1952	TL5191684194; 52°26′05″N 0°14′00″E	1160886	Upload Photo
The Guildhall	Dullingham	House	Before 1495	25 April 1984	TL6297857882; 52°11′42″N 0°22′59″E	1126323	The Guildhall More images
Church of the Holy Cross	Stuntney, Ely	Church	12th-century origins	23 September 1950	TL5558678335; 52°22′51″N 0°17′04″E	1252346	Church of the Holy Cross More images
Hill House	Ely	House	18th century	23 September 1950	TL5402779931; 52°23′45″N 0°15′44″E	1126521	Hill House More images
16 & 18, High St, including Steeple Gate	Ely	House	19th century	23 September 1950	TL5410180336; 52°23′58″N 0°15′49″E	1331714	16 & 18, High St, including Steeple Gate
Sessions House	Ely	Sessions house	Built 1821	23 September 1950	TL5406980515; 52°24′03″N 0°15′48″E	1296765	Sessions House More images
St Mary's Vicarage (Oliver Cromwell's House)	Ely	House	18th century	23 September 1950	TL5380980260; 52°23′55″N 0°15′33″E	1126467	St Mary's Vicarage (Oliver Cromwell's House) More images
The Chantry	Ely	House	18th century	23 September 1950	TL5393780333; 52°23′58″N 0°15′40″E	1126493	The Chantry More images
3 Palace Green	Ely	House	18th century	23 September 1950	TL5399280331; 52°23′58″N 0°15′43″E	1126494	3 Palace Green More images
41 and 41a Broad Street	Ely	House	16th–17th century	23 September 1950	TL5431279884; 52°23′43″N 0°15′59″E	1126523	41 and 41a Broad Street
Parish Church of St Nicholas	Kennett	Parish church	Early 13th century	19 August 1959	TL6999068352; 52°17′13″N 0°29′27″E	1162359	Parish Church of St Nicholas More images
Church of St George	Littleport	Parish church	14th–15th century	5 February 1952	TL5660486934; 52°27′28″N 0°18′12″E	1127027	Church of St George More images
Four urns, at Rose Garden, at Anglesey Abbey	Lode	Urns	Early 18th century	15 June 1984	TL5297062197; 52°14′12″N 0°14′19″E	1165115	Four urns, at Rose Garden, at Anglesey Abbey
Pair of urns, at Hyacinth Garden at Anglesey Abbey	Lode	Urn	17th century	15 June 1984	TL5288562184; 52°14′12″N 0°14′15″E	1127058	Upload Photo
Pair of urns, at Hyacinth Garden, at Anglesey Abbey	Lode	Urn	17th century	15 June 1984	TL5291962172; 52°14′11″N 0°14′17″E	1127061	Upload Photo
Pedestal and urn, at Mill Lawn, at Anglesey Abbey	Lode	Urn	Early 18th century	15 June 1984	TL5305362462; 52°14′21″N 0°14′24″E	1317669	Pedestal and urn, at Mill Lawn, at Anglesey Abbey More images
Sculpture group of Diana and Actaeon, at Jubilee Walk, at Anglesey Abbey	Lode	Sculpture	1720	15 June 1984	TL5310662493; 52°14′22″N 0°14′27″E	1317635	Upload Photo
Urn and temple, at Emperor's Walk, at Anglesey Abbey	Lode	Garden temple	Roman	15 June 1984	TL5320162316; 52°14′16″N 0°14′32″E	1127093	Urn and temple, at Emperor's Walk, at Anglesey Abbey
Church of St Mary	Mepal	Parish church	13th century	5 February 1952	TL4406681106; 52°24′32″N 0°07′00″E	1162875	Church of St Mary More images
Parish Church of St Peter	Snailwell	Parish church	Early 13th century	19 August 1959	TL6421467573; 52°16′54″N 0°24′21″E	1331773	Parish Church of St Peter More images
The Old Rectory and Old Garden Wall	Snailwell	House	12th century	1 December 1951	TL6420867479; 52°16′51″N 0°24′21″E	1331772	The Old Rectory and Old Garden Wall
Downfield Windmill	Downfield, Soham	Mill	1726	1 December 1951	TL6080771752; 52°19′13″N 0°21′29″E	1331761	Downfield Windmill More images
Manor House	Soham	House	c.1730	1 December 1951	TL5938873097; 52°19′58″N 0°20′16″E	1126449	Upload Photo
Northfield Windmill	The Shades, Soham	Corn mill	Early 18th century	17 November 1983	TL5872575101; 52°21′04″N 0°19′44″E	1126418	Northfield Windmill More images
St Nicholas Barway	Barway, Soham	Former church	14th century	19 August 1959	TL5451675777; 52°21′30″N 0°16′03″E	1160740	Upload Photo
Parish Church of St Peter	Stetchworth	Parish church	13th century	19 August 1959	TL6424959028; 52°12′18″N 0°24′08″E	1331821	Parish Church of St Peter More images
Stable block to Egerton Stud	Stetchworth	Stable	1891	25 April 1984	TL6078461319; 52°13′36″N 0°21′10″E	1317792	Upload Photo
Church of St James	Stretham	Parish church	14th century	5 February 1952	TL5119774610; 52°20′55″N 0°13′06″E	1127032	Church of St James More images
Old Engine House	Stretham	Boiler house	1831	13 May 1988	TL5165973009; 52°20′03″N 0°13′28″E	1127031	Old Engine House More images
The Rectory	Stretham	Vicarage	Possibly medieval but mainly late 17th or early 18th century	5 February 1952	TL5116874552; 52°20′54″N 0°13′04″E	1178610	The Rectory
Village Cross	Stretham	Village cross	Early 15th century	5 February 1952	TL5123674616; 52°20′56″N 0°13′08″E	1126992	Village Cross More images
Burgh Hall	Swaffham Bulbeck	House	Late 15th century	1 December 1951	TL5551662016; 52°14′04″N 0°16′33″E	1165918	Burgh Hall More images
Baldwin Manor	Swaffham Prior	Manor house	c.1500	1 December 1951	TL5647663938; 52°15′05″N 0°17′27″E	1331468	Upload Photo
Church of St Cyriac and Julitta	Swaffham Prior	Parish church	c.1500	19 August 1959	TL5682263899; 52°15′03″N 0°17′45″E	1127041	Church of St Cyriac and Julitta More images
The Hall	Swaffham Prior	Manor house	15th century	8 April 1975	TL5673264283; 52°15′16″N 0°17′41″E	1127071	Upload Photo
Windmill, to rear of the Mill House	Swaffham Prior	Smock mill	1864	19 August 1959	TL5722764232; 52°15′14″N 0°18′07″E	1165568	Windmill, to rear of the Mill House More images
Church of St George	Little Thetford, Thetford	Church	Late 14th century	5 February 1952	TL5313176306; 52°21′48″N 0°14′51″E	1302358	Church of St George More images
Church of St Peter	Wentworth	Parish church	12th century	5 February 1952	TL4806378556; 52°23′06″N 0°10′27″E	1331500	Church of St Peter More images
Parish Church of St Mary the Less	Westley Waterless	Parish church	12th century	19 August 1959	TL6179256222; 52°10′50″N 0°21′54″E	1127104	Parish Church of St Mary the Less More images
Church of St Lawrence	Wicken	Church	13th century	19 August 1959	TL5772070584; 52°18′39″N 0°18′44″E	1160994	Church of St Lawrence More images
Windmill	Wicken	Smock mill	Late 18th century or early 19th century	17 November 1983	TL5705470578; 52°18′39″N 0°18′09″E	1126423	Windmill More images
The Burystead	Wilburton	House	c.1610	5 February 1952	TL4860274938; 52°21′09″N 0°10′50″E	1331469	The Burystead More images
The Rectory	Wilburton	First-floor hall house	15th century	5 February 1952	TL4797074898; 52°21′08″N 0°10′16″E	1331470	Upload Photo
Church of St Andrew	Witchford	Parish church	13th century	5 February 1952	TL5038178789; 52°23′11″N 0°12′30″E	1127000	Church of St Andrew More images

== See also ==
- Grade I listed buildings in Cambridgeshire
- Grade II* listed buildings in Cambridgeshire
  - Grade II* listed buildings in Cambridge
  - Grade II* listed buildings in South Cambridgeshire
  - Grade II* listed buildings in Huntingdonshire
  - Grade II* listed buildings in Fenland
  - Grade II* listed buildings in Peterborough (unitary)
