= Grade II* listed buildings in Cambridge =

There are 51 Grade II* listed buildings in Cambridge, England. In the United Kingdom, a listed building is a building or structure of special historical or architectural importance. These buildings are legally protected from demolition, as well as from any extensions or alterations that would adversely affect the building's character or destroy historic features. Listed buildings in England are divided into three categories—Grade II buildings are buildings of special interest; Grade II* buildings are buildings of particular importance; and Grade I buildings, which are those of "exceptional" interest. Around four per cent of listed buildings are given Grade II* status.

Cambridge is a university town located in East Anglia, England. It is home to the University of Cambridge, founded in 1209, and many of the listed buildings are part of the university or its constituent colleges.

== List ==
Name	Location	Type	Completed (Note: The date given is the date used by Historic England as significant for the initial building or that of an important part in the structure's description.)	Date designated	Grid ref. (Note: The grid reference is based on the British national grid reference system, sometimes known as OSGB36, used by the Ordnance Survey.) Geo-coordinates	Entry number (Note: The "List Entry Number" is a unique number assigned to each listed building and scheduled monument by Historic England.)	Image
Anstey Hall	Maris Lane, Trumpington	House	Late 17th century	2 November 1972	TL 44376 54834; 52°10′22″N 0°06′35″E	1331876	Anstey Hall More images
Workshop and store of Arts Theatre (formerly Theatre Royal and Festival Theatre, now Cambridge Buddhist Centre)	36 Newmarket Road	Theatre	1816	26 April 1950	TL4594558775; 52°12′28″N 0°08′04″E	1126148	Workshop and store of Arts Theatre (formerly Theatre Royal and Festival Theatre, now Cambridge Buddhist Centre) More images
Barnwell Priory (the Cellarer's Checker)	Cambridge	Augustinian monastery	13th century	26 April 1950	TL4625158974; 52°12′35″N 0°08′20″E	1126103	Barnwell Priory (the Cellarer's Checker) More images
Church of St Clement	Bridge Street	Church	Late 12th–early 13th century	26 April 1950	TL4481758881; 52°12′33″N 0°07′05″E	1126262	Church of St Clement More images
Church of St Edward, King and Martyr	Peas Hill/St Edward's Passage	Church	Early 13th century	26 April 1950	TL4486958386; 52°12′17″N 0°07′07″E	1126076	Church of St Edward, King and Martyr More images
Church of St Giles	Castle Street	Church	Early 12th century	26 April 1950	TL4460059110; 52°12′40″N 0°06′54″E	1331828	Church of St Giles More images
Church of St Mary the Less (Little St Mary's)	Trumpington Street	Church	12th century	26 April 1950	TL4485557996; 52°12′04″N 0°07′05″E	1051677	Church of St Mary the Less (Little St Mary's) More images
Church of St Peter	St Peter's Street	Church	Late 11th–early 12th century	26 April 1950	TL4453059089; 52°12′40″N 0°06′50″E	1331919	Church of St Peter More images
Church of the Holy Trinity	Market Street	Church	Late 12th century	26 April 1950	TL4498458527; 52°12′21″N 0°07′13″E	1331864	Church of the Holy Trinity More images
Clare College Memorial Court	Clare College	Courtyard	1922–33	10 May 1962	TL4430158417; 52°12′18″N 0°06′37″E	1115639	Clare College Memorial Court More images
Clare College, Gateway to Clare Hall Piece	Clare College	Gate	Early 18th century	26 April 1950	TL4443158397; 52°12′18″N 0°06′44″E	1332170	Clare College, Gateway to Clare Hall Piece More images
Cory House	Northampton Street	House	18th century	26 April 1950	TL4459359034; 52°12′38″N 0°06′53″E	1126151	Cory House More images
Cripps Building at St John's College	St John's College	Hall of residence	Designed 1962–63	31 March 2009	TL4463658891; 52°12′33″N 0°06′55″E	1393223	Cripps Building at St John's College More images
Finella	Queen's Road	House	c.1840	2 August 1996	TL4442258025; 52°12′06″N 0°06′43″E	1268344	Finella More images
Gonville and Caius College, Lecture Rooms	Gonville and Caius College	University college	1883	2 November 1972	TL4473058495; 52°12′20″N 0°07′00″E	1332158	Gonville and Caius College, Lecture Rooms More images
Gonville and Caius College, the north and east ranges of Tree Court and South Wall	Gonville and Caius College	University college	1870	18 May 1967	TL4482258534; 52°12′22″N 0°07′05″E	1115408	Gonville and Caius College, the north and east ranges of Tree Court and South Wall More images
Harvey Court, Gonville and Caius College	Gonville and Caius College	Hall of residence	1960–62	30 March 1993	TL4432658137; 52°12′09″N 0°06′38″E	1126009	Harvey Court, Gonville and Caius College More images
Hobson's Conduit	Lensfield Road/Trumpington Road	Fountain	1614	26 April 1950	TL4515257638; 52°11′52″N 0°07′21″E	1067788	Hobson's Conduit More images
Kerbstones to pool in courtyard to west of Hall, Murray Edwards College (formerly New Hall)	Murray Edwards College	Fountain	1962–66	30 March 1993	TL4412459442; 52°12′52″N 0°06′29″E	1227647	Kerbstones to pool in courtyard to west of Hall, Murray Edwards College (formerly New Hall)
King's College, Gateway to Queen's Road	King's College	Gate	1818	2 November 1972	TL4443458234; 52°12′12″N 0°06′44″E	1318911	King's College, Gateway to Queen's Road More images
Lloyds Bank	1–5 Sidney Street	Bank (financial)	1891	2 November 1972	TL4506758494; 52°12′20″N 0°07′17″E	1331920	Lloyds Bank More images
Magdalene College, Benson Court	Magdalene College	Timber-framed house	16th century	2 November 1972	TL4465358983; 52°12′36″N 0°06′56″E	1332186	Magdalene College, Benson Court More images
Magdalene College, Mallory Court, north-west range	Magdalene College	University college	17th century	2 November 1972	TL4457958994; 52°12′37″N 0°06′52″E	1332185	Magdalene College, Mallory Court, north-west range More images
Merton Hall	Northampton Street	House	17th century	26 April 1950	TL4448258949; 52°12′35″N 0°06′47″E	1331893	Merton Hall
Murray Edwards College (formerly New Hall)	Huntingdon Road	University college	1962–66	30 March 1993	TL4415559425; 52°12′51″N 0°06′31″E	1331922	Murray Edwards College (formerly New Hall) More images
Newnham College, Clough Hall	Newnham College		1875–1910	18 May 1967	TL4407757862; 52°12′01″N 0°06′24″E	1186757	Newnham College, Clough Hall More images
Newnham College, Kennedy Buildings	Newnham College	University college	1905	18 May 1967	TL4401757873; 52°12′01″N 0°06′21″E	1125508	Newnham College, Kennedy Buildings More images
Newnham College, Old Library	Newnham College	Library	1897	18 May 1967	TL4414557869; 52°12′01″N 0°06′28″E	1332187	Newnham College, Old Library More images
Newnham College, Peile Hall	Newnham College		1875–1910	18 May 1967	TL4399357818; 52°11′59″N 0°06′20″E	1186762	Newnham College, Peile Hall More images
Newnham College, Pfeiffer Building	Newnham College	Gate	1892	18 May 1967	TL4420357802; 52°11′59″N 0°06′31″E	1125506	Newnham College, Pfeiffer Building More images
Newnham College, Sidgwick Hall	Newnham College	University college	1880	18 May 1967	TL4416857833; 52°12′00″N 0°06′29″E	1145889	Newnham College, Sidgwick Hall More images
Pembroke College, Library	Pembroke College	Library	1875–77	18 May 1967	TL4493758041; 52°12′06″N 0°07′10″E	1125510	Pembroke College, Library More images
Pembroke College, New Court	Pembroke College	University college	1883	18 May 1967	TL4500558170; 52°12′10″N 0°07′14″E	1125512	Pembroke College, New Court More images
Schlumberger Gould Research Centre	Cambridge	Research centre	1985	17 February 2017	TL4233359154; 52°12′44″N 0°04′54″E	1438644	Schlumberger Gould Research Centre More images
Shawms	Conduit Head Road	Timber-framed house	1938	2 August 1996	TL4280659562; 52°12′57″N 0°05′20″E	1268363	Shawms More images
Sidney Sussex College, Cloister Court	Sidney Sussex College	Walk	1891	18 May 1967	TL4497058735; 52°12′28″N 0°07′13″E	1125496	Sidney Sussex College, Cloister Court More images
St John's College, gate to Trinity Piece south-east of the Wilderness	St John's College	Gate	Early/mid-18th century	2 November 1972	TL4442058647; 52°12′26″N 0°06′44″E	1125491	St John's College, gate to Trinity Piece south-east of the Wilderness
The Old House	Church Lane, Trumpington	House	Late 16th century	26 April 1950	TL4442354969; 52°10′27″N 0°06′38″E	1111864	The Old House More images
Trinity College, Nevile's Gate to Trinity Lane	Trinity College	Gate	c.1610	2 November 1972	TL4470958572; 52°12′23″N 0°06′59″E	1325525	Trinity College, Nevile's Gate to Trinity Lane More images
Trumpington War Memorial	High Street, Trumpington	Cross	1921	12 February 1999	TL4455455119; 52°10′31″N 0°06′45″E	1245571	Trumpington War Memorial More images
Wanstead House	2, Hills Road	House	c.1825	26 April 1950	TL4553657679; 52°11′53″N 0°07′41″E	1099114	Wanstead House More images
Willow House	Conduit Head Road	House	1932	3 August 1992	TL4286959393; 52°12′51″N 0°05′23″E	1331936	Willow House More images
30 and 31 Trinity Street	30 and 31, Trinity Street	House	18th century	26 April 1950	TL4483158609; 52°12′24″N 0°07′05″E	1126068	30 and 31 Trinity Street More images
1 Northampton Street	1 Northampton Street, 13 and 14 Magdalene Street	House	17th century	26 April 1950	TL4460959035; 52°12′38″N 0°06′54″E	1331873	1 Northampton Street
15, 15a, 15b and 16 Magdalene Street	15, 15a, 15b and 16, Magdalene Street	House	17th century	26 April 1950	TL4461759027; 52°12′38″N 0°06′55″E	1347915	15, 15a, 15b and 16 Magdalene Street More images
13 Trinity Street	13, Trinity Street	House	Late 18th century	26 April 1950	TL4485158593; 52°12′24″N 0°07′06″E	1126063	13 Trinity Street
14 Trinity Street	14, Trinity Street	House	Late 16th century	26 April 1950	TL4485158602; 52°12′24″N 0°07′06″E	1331909	14 Trinity Street
31 Trumpington Street	31, Trumpington Street	House	c.1700	26 April 1950	TL4498657913; 52°12′01″N 0°07′12″E	1077008	31 Trumpington Street
The David Parr House	186, Gwydir Street	House		4 August 2020	TL4626457917; 52°12′00″N 0°08′20″E	1470294	The David Parr House More images
48 Storey's Way	48, Storey's Way	House	1913	18 May 1967	TL4357259503; 52°12′54″N 0°06′00″E	1126090	48 Storey's Way More images

== See also ==
- Grade I listed buildings in Cambridge
- Grade II* listed buildings in Cambridgeshire
  - Grade II* listed buildings in South Cambridgeshire
  - Grade II* listed buildings in Huntingdonshire
  - Grade II* listed buildings in Fenland
  - Grade II* listed buildings in East Cambridgeshire
  - Grade II* listed buildings in Peterborough (unitary)
