= Listed buildings in Cambridge (centre, eastern part) =

Non-Civil Parish in Cambridgeshire, England

Cambridge is a city and non-metropolitan district in the county of Cambridgeshire, England It contains 838 listed buildings that are recorded in the National Heritage List for England. Of these 67 are grade I, 54 are grade II* and 717 are grade II.

This list is based on the information retrieved online from Historic England. The quantity of listed buildings in Cambridge requires subdivision into geographically defined lists. This list includes all listed buildings located in eastern and southern part of the city center.

== Key ==
Grade	Criteria
I	Buildings that are of exceptional interest
II*	Particularly important buildings of more than special interest
II	Buildings that are of special interest

== Listing ==
=== Centre, eastern part ===
Name	Grade	Location	Type	Completed (Note: The date given is the date used by Historic England as significant for the initial building or that of an important part in the structure's description.)	Date designated	Grid ref. (Note: The grid reference is based on the British national grid reference system, sometimes known as OSGB36, used by the Ordnance Survey.) Geo-coordinates	Notes	Entry number (Note: The "List Entry Number" is a unique number assigned to each listed building and scheduled monument by Historic England.)	Image	Wikidata
1, Bene't Place	II	1, Bene't Place			19 June 1969	TL4515857672; 52°11′53″N 0°07′21″E		1126187	Upload Photo	Q26419165
4 and 5, Benet Place	II	4 and 5, Bene't Place			26 April 1950	TL4521657678; 52°11′54″N 0°07′24″E		1126188	Upload Photo	Q26419166
1 and 2, Bridge Street	II	1 and 2, Bridge Street	building		2 November 1972	TL4491258741; 52°12′28″N 0°07′10″E		1338534	1 and 2, Bridge Street More images	Q26622849
3, Bridge Street	II	3, Bridge Street			26 April 1950	TL4490458749; 52°12′29″N 0°07′09″E		1126259	Upload Photo	Q26419233
4, Bridge Street	II	4, Bridge Street			26 April 1950	TL4489958756; 52°12′29″N 0°07′09″E		1331840	Upload Photo	Q26616705
8 and 9, Bridge Street	II	8 and 9, Bridge Street			2 November 1972	TL4488158782; 52°12′30″N 0°07′08″E		1338498	Upload Photo	Q26622815
16, Round Church Street (see Details for Further Address Information)	II	10-14, Bridge Street			9 April 1969	TL4485258831; 52°12′31″N 0°07′07″E		1121992	Upload Photo	Q26415124
15 and 16, Bridge Street	II	15 and 16, Bridge Street			26 April 1950	TL4483958844; 52°12′32″N 0°07′06″E		1331841	Upload Photo	Q26616706
The Mitre Public House	II	17 and 18, Bridge Street	pub		2 November 1972	TL4483558851; 52°12′32″N 0°07′06″E		1126261	The Mitre Public House More images	Q26419234
The Baron of Beef Public House	II	19, Bridge Street	pub		2 November 1972	TL4482858861; 52°12′32″N 0°07′05″E		1338552	The Baron of Beef Public House More images	Q7715679
21-24, Bridge Street	II	21-24, Bridge Street			2 November 1972	TL4477758908; 52°12′34″N 0°07′03″E		1121967	Upload Photo	Q26415102
25 and 26, Bridge Street	II	25 and 26, Bridge Street			2 November 1972	TL4477058917; 52°12′34″N 0°07′02″E		1331842	Upload Photo	Q26616707
29, Bridge Street	II	29, Bridge Street			2 November 1972	TL4476058929; 52°12′34″N 0°07′02″E		1126263	Upload Photo	Q26419235
30, Bridge Street	II	30, Bridge Street			2 November 1972	TL4475658932; 52°12′35″N 0°07′02″E		1126225	Upload Photo	Q26419200
66, Bridge Street	II	66, Bridge Street			2 November 1972	TL4486058781; 52°12′30″N 0°07′07″E		1126226	Upload Photo	Q26419201
67, Bridge Street	II	67, Bridge Street			2 November 1972	TL4486458775; 52°12′29″N 0°07′07″E		1126227	Upload Photo	Q26419202
68, Bridge Street	II	68, Bridge Street			2 November 1972	TL4487258764; 52°12′29″N 0°07′08″E		1126228	Upload Photo	Q26419203
69, Bridge Street	II	69, Bridge Street			26 April 1950	TL4487758758; 52°12′29″N 0°07′08″E		1126229	Upload Photo	Q26419204
Entrance Doorway to No 70 and No 70 (the Flying Stag) to Rear	II	71, 71a, 72, Bridge Street			2 November 1972	TL4488658746; 52°12′28″N 0°07′08″E		1126230	Upload Photo	Q26419205
73, Bridge Street	II	73, Bridge Street			2 November 1972	TL4489458740; 52°12′28″N 0°07′09″E		1126231	Upload Photo	Q26419206
Cambridge Union Society Building Union Society Building	II	Bridge Street			18 May 1967	TL4491758829; 52°12′31″N 0°07′10″E		1331810	Upload Photo	Q26616679
Church of St Clement	II*	Bridge Street	church building		26 April 1950	TL4481758881; 52°12′33″N 0°07′05″E		1126262	Church of St Clement More images	Q17543294
Church of the Holy Sepulchre	I	Bridge Street	church building		26 April 1950	TL4488358807; 52°12′30″N 0°07′08″E		1126260	Church of the Holy Sepulchre More images	Q12060465
K6 Telephone Kiosk on the Quayside Pedestrian Area, Cambridge	II	Bridge Street			28 February 2014	TL4473858943; 52°12′35″N 0°07′01″E		1416702	Upload Photo	Q26676535
Magdalene Bridge the Great Bridge	II	Bridge Street	bridge		12 February 1969	TL4471358956; 52°12′35″N 0°06′59″E		1331826	Magdalene Bridge the Great Bridge More images	Q26616694
Telephone Kiosk Outside St Clement's Church	II	Bridge Street			11 February 1988	TL4480058883; 52°12′33″N 0°07′04″E		1265288	Upload Photo	Q26555895
1-10, Brunswick Walk	II	1-10, Brunswick Walk			2 November 1972	TL4560558834; 52°12′31″N 0°07′46″E		1126233	Upload Photo	Q26419208
Jesus Green Lock House	II	Chesterton Road			2 November 1972	TL4501859275; 52°12′45″N 0°07′16″E		1111846	Upload Photo	Q26405642
Jesus Green Lock and Bridge	II	Chesterton Road	bridge		3 August 1989	TL4499359284; 52°12′46″N 0°07′15″E		1126036	Jesus Green Lock and Bridge More images	Q6188205
Pair of K6 Telephone Kiosks by Jesus Lock Bridge	II	Chesterton Road			8 November 2010	TL4497259331; 52°12′47″N 0°07′14″E		1395880	Upload Photo	Q26674710
Botany Building, University of Cambridge	II	Downing Street, CB2 3EA	university building		10 July 2017	TL4508958140; 52°12′09″N 0°07′18″E		1446109	Botany Building, University of Cambridge More images	Q66478752
1-42, Eden Street	II	1-42, Eden Street			2 November 1972	TL4565058540; 52°12′21″N 0°07′48″E		1126212	Upload Photo	Q26419187
3, Emmanuel Road	II	3, Emmanuel Road			2 November 1972	TL4536858427; 52°12′18″N 0°07′33″E		1331856	Upload Photo	Q26616719
8-12, Emmanuel Road	II	1, Earl Street			2 November 1972	TL4539358485; 52°12′20″N 0°07′35″E		1126213	Upload Photo	Q26419188
Gates of the Engineering Laboratories Facing Coe Fen	II	Engineering Laboratory			2 November 1972	TL4493857626; 52°11′52″N 0°07′09″E		1121149	Upload Photo	Q26414331
Church Army Hostel.	II	1-5, Fair Street			2 November 1972	TL4557958729; 52°12′27″N 0°07′45″E		1126214	Upload Photo	Q26419189
17, Fitzroy Street	II	17, Fitzroy Street			21 August 2008	TL4567058659; 52°12′25″N 0°07′49″E		1392720	Upload Photo	Q26671928
1-12, Fitzwilliam Street (see Details for Further Address Information)	II	1-12, Fitzwilliam Street			2 November 1972	TL4502957909; 52°12′01″N 0°07′14″E		1111821	Upload Photo	Q26405617
13, Fitzwilliam Street	II	13, Fitzwilliam Street			2 November 1972	TL4508857944; 52°12′02″N 0°07′18″E		1126215	Upload Photo	Q26419190
15, Fitzwilliam Street	II	15, Fitzwilliam Street			2 November 1972	TL4506257951; 52°12′03″N 0°07′16″E		1111823	Upload Photo	Q26405619
16-24, Fitzwilliam Street	II	16-24, Fitzwilliam Street			2 November 1972	TL4502957928; 52°12′02″N 0°07′15″E		1331858	Upload Photo	Q26616721
Cambridge University Centre	II	Granta Place			18 February 2013	TL4472858001; 52°12′04″N 0°06′59″E		1407952	Upload Photo	Q26675969
County Hall	II	Hobson Street	county hall		2 November 1972	TL4507658642; 52°12′25″N 0°07′18″E		1265198	County Hall More images	Q26555811
1-4, Jesus Lane	II	1-4, Jesus Lane			2 November 1972	TL4492758756; 52°12′29″N 0°07′10″E		1265199	Upload Photo	Q26555812
8-10, Jesus Lane	II	8-10, Jesus Lane			2 November 1972	TL4495458782; 52°12′30″N 0°07′12″E		1126201	Upload Photo	Q26419177
Garden Walls, Railings and Gates of Number 16 (little Trinity)	I	Jesus Lane			26 April 1950	TL4498458814; 52°12′31″N 0°07′14″E		1099109	Upload Photo	Q17527282
Little Trinity	I	16, Jesus Lane	architectural structure		26 April 1950	TL4498058837; 52°12′31″N 0°07′13″E		1331853	Little Trinity More images	Q17527467
20-22, Jesus Lane	II	20-22, Jesus Lane			26 April 1950	TL4500458829; 52°12′31″N 0°07′15″E		1126202	Upload Photo	Q26419178
31, Jesus Lane	II	31, Jesus Lane			26 February 1970	TL4509658839; 52°12′31″N 0°07′19″E		1099933	Upload Photo	Q26392041
32, Jesus Lane	II	32, Jesus Lane			26 April 1950	TL4510858838; 52°12′31″N 0°07′20″E		1331854	Upload Photo	Q26616718
33 and 34, Jesus Lane	II	33 and 34, Jesus Lane			2 November 1972	TL4508058817; 52°12′31″N 0°07′19″E		1126203	Upload Photo	Q26419179
35-37, Jesus Lane	II	35-37, Jesus Lane			2 November 1972	TL4510758813; 52°12′30″N 0°07′20″E		1099938	Upload Photo	Q26392045
47 and 48, Jesus Lane	II	47 and 48, Jesus Lane			2 November 1972	TL4522958780; 52°12′29″N 0°07′26″E		1099950	Upload Photo	Q26392057
49, Jesus Lane	II	49, Jesus Lane			2 November 1972	TL4524858775; 52°12′29″N 0°07′27″E		1126205	Upload Photo	Q26419180
Radegund Buildings	II	50-61, Jesus Lane			2 November 1972	TL4530658763; 52°12′29″N 0°07′30″E		1126206	Upload Photo	Q26419181
62 and 63, Jesus Lane	II	62 and 63, Jesus Lane			2 November 1972	TL4536458749; 52°12′28″N 0°07′33″E		1126207	Upload Photo	Q26419182
All Saints Church	I	Jesus Lane	church building		26 April 1950	TL4517758791; 52°12′30″N 0°07′24″E		1126204	All Saints Church More images	Q4729452
Gateway to Lane Between Numbers 49 and 50	II	Jesus Lane			2 November 1972	TL4525958778; 52°12′29″N 0°07′28″E		1099914	Upload Photo	Q26392023
University Pitt Club	II	Jesus Lane	building		26 April 1950	TL4494358776; 52°12′29″N 0°07′11″E		1099104	University Pitt Club More images	Q26391260
Wesley House	II	Jesus Lane, CB5 8BJ	seminary		22 November 2013	TL4507358865; 52°12′32″N 0°07′18″E		1416617	Wesley House More images	Q7983934
Westcott House	II	Jesus Lane	seminary		18 May 1967	TL4513158809; 52°12′30″N 0°07′21″E		1331855	Westcott House More images	Q7987309
1-9, Jesus Terrace	II	1-9, Jesus Terrace			2 November 1972	TL4557058528; 52°12′21″N 0°07′44″E		1126170	Upload Photo	Q26419148
10, Jesus Terrace	II	10, Jesus Terrace			2 November 1972	TL4554658519; 52°12′20″N 0°07′43″E		1331877	Upload Photo	Q26616736
46 and 48, King Street	II	46 and 48, King Street			2 November 1972	TL4518958685; 52°12′26″N 0°07′24″E		1348480	Upload Photo	Q26631857
50 and 52, King Street	II	50 and 52, King Street			2 November 1972	TL4519958686; 52°12′26″N 0°07′25″E		1126179	Upload Photo	Q26419157
54, King Street	II	54, King Street			2 November 1972	TL4520658687; 52°12′26″N 0°07′25″E		1126180	Upload Photo	Q26419158
56 and 58, King Street	II	56 and 58, King Street			2 November 1972	TL4521658690; 52°12′26″N 0°07′26″E		1100346	Upload Photo	Q26392486
62 and 64, King Street	II	62 and 64, King Street			2 November 1972	TL4523958692; 52°12′26″N 0°07′27″E		1331845	Upload Photo	Q26616710
66, King Street	II	66, King Street			2 November 1972	TL4525058690; 52°12′26″N 0°07′27″E		1126181	Upload Photo	Q26419159
The Champion of the Thames Inn	II	68, King Street	pub		2 November 1972	TL4526058689; 52°12′26″N 0°07′28″E		1100277	The Champion of the Thames Inn More images	Q7722052
The Horse and Groom Public House	II	86, King Street	pub		5 March 1971	TL4531558682; 52°12′26″N 0°07′31″E		1348543	The Horse and Groom Public House More images	Q6412095
Jakenett's Almshouses	II	90 and 94, King Street	almshouse		5 March 1971	TL4533258684; 52°12′26″N 0°07′32″E		1126182	Jakenett's Almshouses More images	Q26419160
Wesley Church and Attached Library	II	King Street	church building		20 February 1987	TL4542558694; 52°12′26″N 0°07′37″E		1265284	Wesley Church and Attached Library More images	Q26555891
Lensfield Road	II	2 and 3, Bene't Place			19 June 1969	TL4517957673; 52°11′53″N 0°07′22″E		1100627	Upload Photo	Q26393133
2 and 4, Lensfield Road	II	2 and 4, Lensfield Road			2 November 1972	TL4546757806; 52°11′57″N 0°07′37″E		1126184	Upload Photo	Q26419162
The Oak Public House	II	6, Lensfield Road			2 November 1972	TL4546657798; 52°11′57″N 0°07′37″E		1126185	The Oak Public House More images	Q26419163
8, Lensfield Road	II	8, Lensfield Road			2 November 1972	TL4546457790; 52°11′57″N 0°07′37″E		1100621	Upload Photo	Q26393125
10-14, Lensfield Road	II	10-14, Lensfield Road			2 November 1972	TL4545957780; 52°11′57″N 0°07′37″E		1126186	Upload Photo	Q26419164
16, Lensfield Road	II	16, Lensfield Road			2 November 1972	TL4545557772; 52°11′56″N 0°07′37″E		1348348	Upload Photo	Q26631738
Number 1 Little St Marys Lane Including Gas Lamp Attached to the South East Corner	II	1, Little St Marys Lane			2 November 1972	TL4483458013; 52°12′05″N 0°07′04″E		1126152	Upload Photo	Q26419130
8-11, Little St Mary's Lane	II	8-11, 12-14, Little St Mary's Lane			29 March 1962	TL4480757998; 52°12′04″N 0°07′03″E		1331870	Upload Photo	Q26616731
Museum of Classical Archaeology Peterhouse, Arch in North Boundary Wall of the College	II	Little St Mary's Lane, Peterhouse			2 November 1972	TL4477057959; 52°12′03″N 0°07′01″E		1126153	Upload Photo	Q26419131
Railings and Gates and Gas Lamp Bordering the Churchyard of St Mary the Less on North and West Sides	II	Little Saint Marys Lane			14 November 2003	TL4483558003; 52°12′04″N 0°07′04″E		1390744	Upload Photo	Q26670124
19-44 Lower Park Street	II	19-44, Lower Park Street			2 August 1996	TL4497858964; 52°12′35″N 0°07′13″E		1268378	Upload Photo	Q26558687
4 and 6, Maid's Causeway	II	4 and 6, Maid's Causeway			2 November 1972	TL4547558724; 52°12′27″N 0°07′39″E		1101473	Upload Photo	Q26394935
8-18, Maid's Causeway (see Details for Further Address Information)	II	20, Maid's Causeway			26 April 1950	TL4553258731; 52°12′27″N 0°07′42″E		1126163	Upload Photo	Q26419141
27-33, Maid's Causeway	II	27-33, Maid's Causeway			2 November 1972	TL4561258778; 52°12′29″N 0°07′47″E		1126165	Upload Photo	Q26419143
32-50, Maid's Causeway	II	32-50, Maid's Causeway			2 November 1972	TL4565058746; 52°12′28″N 0°07′48″E		1101771	Upload Photo	Q26395558
39-53, Maid's Causeway	II	39-53, Maid's Causeway			2 November 1972	TL4566458784; 52°12′29″N 0°07′49″E		1347789	Upload Photo	Q26631217
55-71, Maid's Causeway	II	55-71, Maid's Causeway			2 November 1972	TL4572358796; 52°12′29″N 0°07′52″E		1126166	Upload Photo	Q26419144
73, Maid's Causeway	II	73, Maid's Causeway			2 November 1972	TL4576358818; 52°12′30″N 0°07′55″E		1126167	Upload Photo	Q26419145
Footway and Iron Railings Stretching from the Short Street Corner Outside Number 2 to Number 70	II	Maid's Causeway			2 November 1972	TL4547158740; 52°12′28″N 0°07′39″E		1126162	Upload Photo	Q26419140
The Brick Wall Joining Number 20 to Number 1 Fair Street	II	Maid's Causeway			2 November 1972	TL4557058741; 52°12′28″N 0°07′44″E		1126164	Upload Photo	Q26419142
7-11, Malcolm Street (see Details for Further Address Information)	II	1-6, Malcolm Street			2 November 1972	TL4508658768; 52°12′29″N 0°07′19″E		1347815	Upload Photo	Q26631242
1-16, Melbourne Place	II	1-16, Melbourne Place			2 November 1972	TL4559358365; 52°12′15″N 0°07′45″E		1331865	Upload Photo	Q26616726
5-10, Park Street	II	5-10, Park Street			2 August 1996	TL4496258873; 52°12′32″N 0°07′12″E		1268377	Upload Photo	Q26558686
Fort St George Public House	II	Midsummer Common	pub		2 November 1972	TL4547559270; 52°12′45″N 0°07′40″E		1126138	Fort St George Public House More images	Q5472087
Nos. 1-32 and 35-48 New Square	II	1-4, New Square			2 November 1972	TL4558758573; 52°12′22″N 0°07′45″E		1126150	Upload Photo	Q26419129
49, New Square	II	49, New Square			2 November 1972	TL4547658676; 52°12′26″N 0°07′39″E		1346207	Upload Photo	Q26629777
6 and 8, Newmarket Road	II	6 and 8, Newmarket Road			2 November 1972	TL4580458781; 52°12′29″N 0°07′57″E		1338846	Upload Photo	Q26623137
26, Newmarket Road	II	26, Newmarket Road			2 November 1972	TL4592458798; 52°12′29″N 0°08′03″E		1331866	Upload Photo	Q26616727
Arts Theatre Workshop and Store	II*	36, Newmarket Road, Barnwell	theatre building		26 April 1950	TL4594558775; 52°12′28″N 0°08′04″E		1126148	Arts Theatre Workshop and Store More images	Q31680911
38, Newmarket Road	II	38, Newmarket Road			2 August 1996	TL4596058797; 52°12′29″N 0°08′05″E		1268375	Upload Photo	Q26558684
Church of Christ Church	II	Newmarket Road	church building		2 November 1972	TL4587158770; 52°12′28″N 0°08′00″E		1126147	Church of Christ Church More images	Q26419127
Churchyard Wall and Railings and Parish Room of Christ Church	II	Newmarket Road			2 November 1972	TL4585558792; 52°12′29″N 0°07′59″E		1338870	Upload Photo	Q26623156
9a, Orchard Street	II	1-9, Orchard Street			29 March 1962	TL4549658530; 52°12′21″N 0°07′40″E		1331895	Upload Photo	Q26616753
16, Orchard Street	II	16, Orchard Street			2 November 1972	TL4555858492; 52°12′20″N 0°07′43″E		1126116	Upload Photo	Q26419097
1-6, Park Terrace	II	1-6, Park Terrace			26 April 1950	TL4540058244; 52°12′12″N 0°07′35″E		1366287	Upload Photo	Q26647893
7 and 8, Park Terrace	II	7 and 8, Park Terrace			2 November 1972	TL4541758274; 52°12′13″N 0°07′35″E		1331898	Upload Photo	Q26616756
9-14, Park Terrace	II	9-14, Park Terrace			26 April 1950	TL4543358304; 52°12′14″N 0°07′36″E		1126129	Upload Photo	Q26419110
Camden House	II	Park Terrace			26 April 1950	TL4538258216; 52°12′11″N 0°07′34″E		1126128	Upload Photo	Q26419109
Furness Lodge	II	Park Terrace			8 September 1970	TL4536858198; 52°12′10″N 0°07′33″E		1126127	Upload Photo	Q26419108
Park Lodge	II	Park Terrace			2 November 1972	TL4545158337; 52°12′15″N 0°07′37″E		1068550	Upload Photo	Q26321256
1-6, Parker Street	II	1-6, Parker Street			2 November 1972	TL4539058393; 52°12′17″N 0°07′34″E		1126119	Upload Photo	Q26419100
7 and 7a, Parker Street	II	7 and 7a, Parker Street			2 November 1972	TL4541958380; 52°12′16″N 0°07′36″E		1126120	Upload Photo	Q26419101
8, Parker Street	II	8, Parker Street			2 November 1972	TL4543458374; 52°12′16″N 0°07′37″E		1063719	Upload Photo	Q26317013
9-13, Parker Street	II	9-13, Parker Street			2 November 1972	TL4545458364; 52°12′16″N 0°07′38″E		1126121	Upload Photo	Q26419102
14-16, Parker Street	II	14-16, Parker Street			2 November 1972	TL4541958357; 52°12′15″N 0°07′36″E		1065688	Upload Photo	Q26318738
Lamp Standard	II	Parkers Piece, CB1 1NA			2 August 1996	TL4553558129; 52°12′08″N 0°07′41″E		1268376	Upload Photo	Q130177
20 and 21, Parkside	II	20 and 21, Parkside			2 November 1972	TL4548358350; 52°12′15″N 0°07′39″E		1126122	Upload Photo	Q26419103
22, Parkside	II	22, Parkside			2 November 1972	TL4549658344; 52°12′15″N 0°07′40″E		1357599	Upload Photo	Q26640106
23-25, Parkside	II	23-25, Parkside			2 November 1972	TL4551158336; 52°12′15″N 0°07′41″E		1126123	Upload Photo	Q26419104
27, Parkside	II	27, Parkside			2 November 1972	TL4553658319; 52°12′14″N 0°07′42″E		1126124	Upload Photo	Q26419105
28, Parkside	II	28, Parkside			2 November 1972	TL4554858312; 52°12′14″N 0°07′42″E		1126125	Upload Photo	Q26419106
29, Parkside (see Details for Further Address Information)	II	29, Parkside			2 November 1972	TL4555158309; 52°12′14″N 0°07′43″E		1331896	Upload Photo	Q26616754
York House	II	30-32, Parkside			2 November 1972	TL4556558303; 52°12′13″N 0°07′43″E		1065694	Upload Photo	Q26318742
33, Parkside	II	33, Parkside			2 November 1972	TL4557658297; 52°12′13″N 0°07′44″E		1065712	Upload Photo	Q26318757
35, Parkside	II	35, Parkside			2 November 1972	TL4559158292; 52°12′13″N 0°07′45″E		1126126	Upload Photo	Q26419107
36 and 37, Parkside	II	36 and 37, Parkside			2 November 1972	TL4560558278; 52°12′13″N 0°07′45″E		1331897	Upload Photo	Q26616755
38-40, Parkside	II	38-40, Parkside			2 November 1972	TL4562558263; 52°12′12″N 0°07′46″E		1065717	Upload Photo	Q26318762
3-9, Portland Place	II	3-9, Portland Place			2 November 1972	TL4560858521; 52°12′20″N 0°07′46″E		1126096	Upload Photo	Q26419078
8, Portugal Place	II	8, Portugal Place			2 November 1972	TL4485458894; 52°12′33″N 0°07′07″E		1126097	Upload Photo	Q26419079
9-14, Portugal Place	II	9-14, Portugal Place			2 November 1972	TL4485858911; 52°12′34″N 0°07′07″E		1126098	Upload Photo	Q26419080
16-18, Portugal Place	II	16-18, Portugal Place			2 November 1972	TL4487158935; 52°12′35″N 0°07′08″E		1126099	Upload Photo	Q26419081
23-27, Portugal Place	II	23-27, Portugal Place			2 November 1972	TL4485258923; 52°12′34″N 0°07′07″E		1126100	Upload Photo	Q26419082
28 and 29, Portugal Place	II	28 and 29, Portugal Place			2 November 1972	TL4484458907; 52°12′34″N 0°07′06″E		1126101	Upload Photo	Q26419083
Numbers 1, 1a, 2 and 3 and Attached Railings	II	1, 2 and 3, Prospect Row			6 July 1999	TL4564758440; 52°12′18″N 0°07′48″E		1245572	Upload Photo	Q26538089
Downing College, Gate Lodge and Gates	II	36, Regent Street, Downing College			26 April 1950	TL4533558037; 52°12′05″N 0°07′31″E		1125518	Upload Photo	Q26418518
Glengary Hotel	II	41, Regent Street	hotel		2 November 1972	TL4537058023; 52°12′05″N 0°07′33″E		1331887	Glengary Hotel More images	Q26616746
78 and 80, Regent Street	II	78 and 80, Regent Street			2 November 1972	TL4540857912; 52°12′01″N 0°07′34″E		1356196	Upload Photo	Q26638884
112-116, Regent Street	II	112-116, Regent Street			2 November 1972	TL4546457816; 52°11′58″N 0°07′37″E		1126105	Upload Photo	Q26419086
Nos. 1-12 Scroope Terrace, the 1959 Rear Extension to No. 1 Scroope Terrace and the Railings to the Front	II	1-12, Scroope Terrace			2 November 1972	TL4508057695; 52°11′54″N 0°07′17″E		1049092	Upload Photo	Q26301147
1-4, Short Street	II	1-4, Short Street			2 November 1972	TL4545658720; 52°12′27″N 0°07′38″E		1068782	Upload Photo	Q26321476
Lloyd's Bank	II*	1, 2, 3, 4 and 5, Sidney Street	bank building		2 November 1972	TL4506758494; 52°12′20″N 0°07′17″E		1331920	Lloyd's Bank More images	Q26268214
Harrington House Kent House Montagu House Sidney House Sussex House	II	23, 24 and 25, Sidney Street			2 August 1996	TL4503658616; 52°12′24″N 0°07′16″E		1268348	Upload Photo	Q26558662
35, 36 and 37, Sidney Street	II	35, 36 and 37, Sidney Street, CB2 3HX			2 November 1972	TL4492958685; 52°12′26″N 0°07′10″E		1126087	Upload Photo	Q26419070
46, Sidney Street	II	46, Sidney Street			2 November 1972	TL4495458648; 52°12′25″N 0°07′12″E		1126088	Upload Photo	Q26419071
47 and 48, Sidney Street	II	47 and 48, Sidney Street			2 November 1972	TL4495858635; 52°12′25″N 0°07′12″E		1356115	Upload Photo	Q26638810
49, Sidney Street	II	49, Sidney Street			2 November 1972	TL4496358627; 52°12′25″N 0°07′12″E		1331921	Upload Photo	Q26616775
Pair of K6 Telephone Kiosks Outside Holy Trinity War Memorial Shelter	II	Sidney Street			8 November 2010	TL4501258523; 52°12′21″N 0°07′15″E		1395878	Upload Photo	Q26674708
4-7, St Andrew's Street	II	4-7, St Andrew's Street			2 November 1972	TL4511558398; 52°12′17″N 0°07′20″E		1068665	Upload Photo	Q26321363
22, St Andrew's Street	II	22, St Andrew's Street			2 November 1972	TL4516758312; 52°12′14″N 0°07′22″E		1126108	Upload Photo	Q26419089
23, St Andrew's Street	II	23, St Andrew's Street			2 November 1972	TL4516958307; 52°12′14″N 0°07′22″E		1068674	Upload Photo	Q26321372
24, St Andrew's Street	II	24, St Andrew's Street			2 November 1972	TL4517158302; 52°12′14″N 0°07′23″E		1331890	Upload Photo	Q26616749
25, St Andrew's Street	II	25, St Andrew's Street			2 November 1972	TL4517458297; 52°12′14″N 0°07′23″E		1126109	Upload Photo	Q26419090
33 and 34, St Andrew's Street	II	33 and 34, St Andrew's Street			2 November 1972	TL4520958242; 52°12′12″N 0°07′24″E		1068676	Upload Photo	Q26321374
35, St Andrew's Street	II	35, St Andrew's Street			2 November 1972	TL4521258237; 52°12′12″N 0°07′25″E		1126110	Upload Photo	Q26419092
K6 Telephone Kiosk, St Andrew's Street	II	38-39, St Andrews Street, CB2 3AR			24 June 2025	TL4525358207; 52°12′11″N 0°07′27″E		1493712	Upload Photo	Q136386166
Former Police Station	II	42-44, St Andrews Street, CB2 3AS			18 May 1967	TL4526158157; 52°12′09″N 0°07′27″E		1068682	Upload Photo	Q26321380
Belmont	II	55, St Andrew's Street			26 April 1950	TL4527558193; 52°12′10″N 0°07′28″E		1331891	Upload Photo	Q26616750
Church of St Andrew the Great	II	St Andrew's Street	church building		26 April 1950	TL4508658428; 52°12′18″N 0°07′18″E		1331889	Church of St Andrew the Great More images	Q20128106
St Andrew the Great War Memorial, Cambridge	II	St. Andrews Street, CB2 3AX	war memorial		9 May 2016	TL4508358446; 52°12′19″N 0°07′18″E		1434610	St Andrew the Great War Memorial, Cambridge More images	Q26678028
Trumpington Street	II	1-7, St Peter's Terrace			2 November 1972	TL4505557748; 52°11′56″N 0°07′16″E		1049122	Upload Photo	Q26301175
4-12, Tennis Court Road	II	4-12, Tennis Court Road			18 May 1967	TL4506858002; 52°12′04″N 0°07′17″E		1331883	Upload Photo	Q26616742
Kellett Lodge	II	Tennis Court Road			2 November 1972	TL4517857778; 52°11′57″N 0°07′22″E		1343654	Upload Photo	Q26627437
1-6, Tennis Court Terrace	II	1-6, Tennis Court Terrace			2 November 1972	TL4503358005; 52°12′04″N 0°07′15″E		1126092	Upload Photo	Q26419074
29, Thompson's Lane	II	29, Thompson's Lane			2 November 1972	TL4481158980; 52°12′36″N 0°07′05″E		1126057	Upload Photo	Q26419044
30, Thompson's Lane	II	30, Thompson's Lane			26 April 1950	TL4480658967; 52°12′36″N 0°07′04″E		1126058	Upload Photo	Q26419045
31 Thompson's Lane	II	31, Thompson's Lane			2 November 1972	TL4480158949; 52°12′35″N 0°07′04″E		1126059	Upload Photo	Q26419046
The Old Vicarage	II	Thompson's Lane			29 March 1962	TL4480858913; 52°12′34″N 0°07′04″E		1331884	Upload Photo	Q26616743
74, Trumpington Street	II	74, Trumpington Street			29 March 1962	TL4484258049; 52°12′06″N 0°07′05″E		1126051	Upload Photo	Q26419038
House Adjoining Number 74 on the North	II	Trumpington Street			2 November 1972	TL4484058062; 52°12′06″N 0°07′05″E		1051670	Upload Photo	Q26303513
Railings and Gates of St Peter's Terrace Fronting Trumpington Street	II	Trumpington Street			2 November 1972	TL4508557756; 52°11′56″N 0°07′17″E		1126054	Upload Photo	Q26419041
Telephone Kiosk Outside Addenbrooke's Hospital	II	Trumpington Street			11 February 1988	TL4506457827; 52°11′59″N 0°07′16″E		1227597	Upload Photo	Q26521500
Gates, Gate Piers and Railings of the Cambridge Judge Business School Fronting Trumpington Street	II	University Of Cambridge, Trumpington Street, CB2 1AG			2 November 1972	TL4505057844; 52°11′59″N 0°07′16″E		1331902	Upload Photo	Q26616760
Emmanuel United Reformed Church	II	Trumpington Street	church building		2 August 1996	TL4485258024; 52°12′05″N 0°07′05″E		1268350	Emmanuel United Reformed Church More images	Q5373357
Hobson's Conduit	II	Trumpington Street			18 December 2007	TL4509757730; 52°11′55″N 0°07′18″E		1408939	Upload Photo	Q26676042
Church Fence of St Mary the Less Fronting Trumpington Street	II	Trumpington Street			2 November 1972	TL4487758014; 52°12′05″N 0°07′07″E		1126052	Upload Photo	Q26419039
Church of St Mary the Less	II*	Trumpington Street	church building		26 April 1950	TL4485557996; 52°12′04″N 0°07′05″E		1051677	Church of St Mary the Less More images	Q5117577
Cambridge Judge Business School	II*	Trumpington Street, CB2 1AG			29 October 1986	TL4510557867; 52°12′00″N 0°07′18″E		1126031	Upload Photo	Q26419017
Fence Along Street Frontage of the Main Block of the Fitzwilliam Museum	I	Trumpington Street			26 April 1950	TL4496457907; 52°12′01″N 0°07′11″E		1126277	Upload Photo	Q67600705
Grove Lodge and Outbuilding to South	II	Trumpington Street			26 April 1950	TL4499457786; 52°11′57″N 0°07′12″E		1126053	Upload Photo	Q26419040
K6 Telephone Kiosk Outside St Peter's Terrace	II	Near The Junction With Trumpington Street, CB2 1QQ			17 September 2021	TL4505957796; 52°11′58″N 0°07′16″E		1475174	Upload Photo	Q111853480
Construction in Aluminium by Kenneth Martin, Department of Engineering, University of Cambridge	II	Department Of Engineering, University Of Cambridge, Trumpington Street, CB2 1PZ	sculpture		19 January 2016	TL4509657722; 52°11′55″N 0°07′18″E		1430147	Construction in Aluminium by Kenneth Martin, Department of Engineering, University of Cambridge More images	Q26677576
1, Trumpington Street	II	1, Trumpington Street			2 November 1972	TL4513857674; 52°11′54″N 0°07′20″E		1126040	Upload Photo	Q26419026
2, Trumpington Street	II	2, Trumpington Street			2 November 1972	TL4513357689; 52°11′54″N 0°07′20″E		1126041	Upload Photo	Q26419027
10, Trumpington Street	II	10, Trumpington Street			26 April 1950	TL4512457737; 52°11′56″N 0°07′19″E		1331939	Upload Photo	Q26616791
11 and 12, Trumpington Street	II	11 and 12, Trumpington Street			2 November 1972	TL4511657746; 52°11′56″N 0°07′19″E		1126042	Upload Photo	Q26419028
13 and 14, Trumpington Street	II	13 and 14, Trumpington Street			2 November 1972	TL4511257755; 52°11′56″N 0°07′19″E		1331940	Upload Photo	Q26616792
15 and 16, Trumpington Street	II	15 and 16, Trumpington Street			2 November 1972	TL4510857765; 52°11′56″N 0°07′18″E		1126043	Upload Photo	Q26419029
Four Richardson Candles Outside No.s 10, 16, 19 and Opposite 19 Trumpington Street	II	16 and 19 And Opposite No. 19, Trumpington Street			6 May 2011	TL4511557732; 52°11′55″N 0°07′19″E		1400907	Upload Photo	Q26675451
17, Trumpington Street	II	17, Trumpington Street			26 April 1950	TL4509957777; 52°11′57″N 0°07′18″E		1331941	Upload Photo	Q26616793
18 and 19, Trumpington Street	II	18 and 19, Trumpington Street			2 November 1972	TL4509157790; 52°11′57″N 0°07′18″E		1126044	Upload Photo	Q26419031
21, Trumpington Street	II	21, Trumpington Street			2 November 1972	TL4508157803; 52°11′58″N 0°07′17″E		1126045	Upload Photo	Q26419032
25-27, Trumpington Street	II	25-27, Trumpington Street			2 November 1972	TL4502057881; 52°12′00″N 0°07′14″E		1356610	Upload Photo	Q26639250
30, Trumpington Street	II	30, Trumpington Street			26 April 1950	TL4499857905; 52°12′01″N 0°07′13″E		1126046	Upload Photo	Q26419033
31, Trumpington Street	II*	31, Trumpington Street			26 April 1950	TL4498657913; 52°12′01″N 0°07′12″E		1077008	Upload Photo	Q17543201
Buildings Surrounding Tunwell's Court	II	33 and 34, Trumpington Street			26 April 1950	TL4497357922; 52°12′02″N 0°07′12″E		1331903	Upload Photo	Q26616761
35 and 36, Trumpington Street	II	35 and 36, Trumpington Street			2 November 1972	TL4496957932; 52°12′02″N 0°07′11″E		1126047	Upload Photo	Q26419034
The Little Rose Inn	II	37 and 38, Trumpington Street	inn		26 April 1950	TL4495557945; 52°12′02″N 0°07′11″E		1342743	The Little Rose Inn More images	Q26626687
39 and 40, Trumpington Street	II	39 and 40, Trumpington Street			2 November 1972	TL4494357956; 52°12′03″N 0°07′10″E		1126048	Upload Photo	Q26419035
Fitzwilliam Museum and Boundary Wall, Plinths and Gates to the North-east	I	Trumpington Street			26 April 1950	TL4497157865; 52°12′00″N 0°07′11″E		1126276	Upload Photo	Q67600449
Richardson Candle Group in Trumpington Street Including the Fitzwilliam Museum	II	Trumpington Street			6 May 2011	TL4488358030; 52°12′05″N 0°07′07″E		1400913	Upload Photo	Q26675453
Victoria Bridge	II	Victoria Avenue	road bridge		2 November 1972	TL4533059358; 52°12′48″N 0°07′33″E		1126056	Victoria Bridge More images	Q7926572
2-17, Willow Walk	II	2-17, Willow Walk			2 November 1972	TL4552258695; 52°12′26″N 0°07′42″E		1126026	Upload Photo	Q26419013

=== Christ's College ===
Name	Grade	Location	Type	Completed	Date designated	Grid ref. Geo-coordinates	Notes	Entry number	Image	Wikidata
Christ's College, Bathing Pool and Summer House, Including the Busts of Cudworth, Milton and Saunderson and Stone Vase in Memory of Joseph Mede	I	Christs College			26 April 1950	TL4522958644; 52°12′25″N 0°07′26″E		1125548	Upload Photo	Q17527367
Christ's College, North East Range, Third Court	II	Christs College			18 May 1967	TL4512758604; 52°12′24″N 0°07′21″E		1125547	Upload Photo	Q26418540
Christ's College, the Buildings Surrounding Entrance Court, with the South East Range of Second Court	I	Christs College			26 April 1950	TL4509958461; 52°12′19″N 0°07′19″E		1332166	Upload Photo	Q130550308
Christ's College, Fellows Building	I	Christs College			26 April 1950	TL4517958531; 52°12′21″N 0°07′23″E		1320286	Upload Photo	Q17527435
Christ's College, Tutor's House	II	18, Hobson Street, Christs College			2 November 1972	TL4508258576; 52°12′23″N 0°07′18″E		1115720	Upload Photo	Q26409416
Christ's College, 'X' Staircase	II	32, Hobson Street	house		26 April 1950	TL4507458622; 52°12′24″N 0°07′18″E		1332167	Christ's College, 'X' Staircase More images	Q26617004
Christ's College, Wall Bounding the Fellows' Garden on East Side and Fronting Miltons Walk	II	Christs College			2 November 1972	TL4522658591; 52°12′23″N 0°07′26″E		1332168	Upload Photo	Q26617005
Christ's College, Wall Bounding the Fellows' Garden on North and West Sides	II	Christs College			26 April 1950	TL4518058661; 52°12′25″N 0°07′24″E		1115691	Upload Photo	Q26409389

=== Downing College ===
Name	Grade	Location	Type	Completed	Date designated	Grid ref. Geo-coordinates	Notes	Entry number	Image	Wikidata
Downing College, Boundary Wall Fronting Tennis Court Road	II	Downing College			2 November 1972	TL4514457876; 52°12′00″N 0°07′21″E		1125521	Upload Photo	Q26418521
Fence and Gates to Downing Site Fronting Tennis Court Road Railings of Downing Site	II	Downing College			2 November 1972	TL4507058039; 52°12′05″N 0°07′17″E		1126275	Upload Photo	Q26419246
Geological Museum, Law School and University Museum of Archaeology and Ethnology	II	Downing Street, Downing Site			18 May 1967	TL4507858192; 52°12′10″N 0°07′18″E		1120793	Upload Photo	Q26414001
Downing College, North West Gate Onto Tennis Court Road Opposite Fitzwilliam Street	II	Downing College			2 November 1972	TL4510757951; 52°12′03″N 0°07′19″E		1125520	Upload Photo	Q26418520
Downing College, the East and West Ranges, Including the Hall, the Master's Lodge and the East and West Lodges	I	Downing College	college of the University of Cambridge		26 April 1950	TL4520457907; 52°12′01″N 0°07′24″E		1125517	Downing College, the East and West Ranges, Including the Hall, the Master's Lodge and the East and West Lodges More images	Q181461
Downing College, West Gate Onto Tennis Court Road, Including Short Screen Walls on Either Side	II	Downing College			2 November 1972	TL4512957909; 52°12′01″N 0°07′20″E		1125519	Upload Photo	Q26418519

=== Emmanuel College ===
Name	Grade	Location	Type	Completed	Date designated	Grid ref. Geo-coordinates	Notes	Entry number	Image	Wikidata
Emmanuel College, Boundary Wall Facing Emmanuel Street and Drummer	II	Emmanuel College			2 November 1972	TL4524958397; 52°12′17″N 0°07′27″E		1332195	Upload Photo	Q26617023
Emmanuel College, Buildings Surrounding Front and New Courts and the Brick Building	I	Emmanuel College	college of the University of Cambridge		26 April 1950	TL4523558308; 52°12′14″N 0°07′26″E		1332193	Emmanuel College, Buildings Surrounding Front and New Courts and the Brick Building More images	Q797892
Emmanuel College, Emmanuel House	II	Emmanuel College			18 May 1967	TL4535758390; 52°12′16″N 0°07′33″E		1125522	Upload Photo	Q26418522
Emmanuel College, Hostel (next South of Emmanuel House)	II	Emmanuel College			2 November 1972	TL4538358377; 52°12′16″N 0°07′34″E		1125523	Upload Photo	Q26418523
Emmanuel College, North Court	II	Emmanuel College	architectural structure		18 May 1967	TL4520358426; 52°12′18″N 0°07′24″E		1332196	Emmanuel College, North Court More images	Q26617024
Emmanuel College, Railings of North Court Fronting Drummer Street	II	Emmanuel College			2 November 1972	TL4524258448; 52°12′18″N 0°07′27″E		1115416	Upload Photo	Q26409150
Emmanuel College, the Bath	II	Emmanuel College			2 November 1972	TL4526758399; 52°12′17″N 0°07′28″E		1125524	Upload Photo	Q26418524
Emmanuel College, the Library	II	Emmanuel College			18 May 1967	TL4533858260; 52°12′12″N 0°07′31″E		1332194	Upload Photo	Q26617022
Emmanuel College, Wall Bounding the Paddock on the South East and Backing the Gardens of Park Terrace	II	Emmanuel College			2 November 1972	TL4538858311; 52°12′14″N 0°07′34″E		1115440	Upload Photo	Q26409170
Emmanuel College, Wall Facing St Andrew's Street to the South East of Front Court	II	Emmanuel College			2 November 1972	TL4524058244; 52°12′12″N 0°07′26″E		1125525	Upload Photo	Q26418525

=== Jesus College ===
Name	Grade	Location	Type	Completed	Date designated	Grid ref. Geo-coordinates	Notes	Entry number	Image	Wikidata
Jesus College, Boundary Wall, Piers and Gates on Jesus Lane and the Walls Flanking the Chimney	II	Jesus College	building		26 April 1950	TL4518258843; 52°12′31″N 0°07′24″E		1125530	Jesus College, Boundary Wall, Piers and Gates on Jesus Lane and the Walls Flanking the Chimney More images	Q26418528
Jesus College, East Range of Chapel Court	II	Jesus College			2 November 1972	TL4531058925; 52°12′34″N 0°07′31″E		1125531	Upload Photo	Q26418529
Jesus College, Gateway and Screen on North Side of Chapel Court	II	Jesus College			2 November 1972	TL4527158957; 52°12′35″N 0°07′29″E		1139030	Upload Photo	Q26431985
Jesus College, Gateway to Victoria Avenue	II	Jesus College			2 November 1972	TL4542758926; 52°12′34″N 0°07′37″E		1332161	Upload Photo	Q26616999
North Court, Jesus College	II	Jesus Lane			30 March 1993	TL4513459023; 52°12′37″N 0°07′22″E		1126004	Upload Photo	Q26418992
Jesus College, North Range of New Court	II	Jesus College			2 November 1972	TL4520558984; 52°12′36″N 0°07′25″E		1329916	Upload Photo	Q26615101
Jesus College, North Range of Outer Court	I	Jesus College			26 April 1950	TL4518058933; 52°12′34″N 0°07′24″E		1139049	Upload Photo	Q17527421
Jesus College, the Buildings Surrounding Cloister and Outer Courts, and the East Range of Pump Court (excluding the North Range of Outer Court)	I	Jesus College	charitable organization		26 April 1950	TL4520258890; 52°12′33″N 0°07′25″E		1125529	Jesus College, the Buildings Surrounding Cloister and Outer Courts, and the East Range of Pump Court (excluding the North Range of Outer Court) More images	Q1146700
Jesus College, Wall of Fellows' Garden in Outer Court	II	Jesus College			2 November 1972	TL4514958892; 52°12′33″N 0°07′22″E		1332160	Upload Photo	Q26616998

=== Pembroke College ===
Name	Grade	Location	Type	Completed	Date designated	Grid ref. Geo-coordinates	Notes	Entry number	Image	Wikidata
Pembroke College, Boundary Wall Fronting Tennis Court Terrace	II	Pembroke College			2 November 1972	TL4502258018; 52°12′05″N 0°07′14″E		1332191	Upload Photo	Q26617021
Pembroke College, Library	II*	Pembroke College			18 May 1967	TL4493758041; 52°12′06″N 0°07′10″E		1125510	Upload Photo	Q17543253
Pembroke College, New Court	II*	Pembroke College	college of the University of Cambridge		18 May 1967	TL4500558170; 52°12′10″N 0°07′14″E		1125512	Pembroke College, New Court More images	Q956501
Pembroke College, Old Master's Lodge	II	Pembroke College			18 May 1967	TL4496258126; 52°12′08″N 0°07′11″E		1125511	Upload Photo	Q26418513
Block Between Ivy Court and Old Master's Lodge	II	Pembroke College			18 May 1967	TL4493558128; 52°12′08″N 0°07′10″E		1087091	Upload Photo	Q26379568
Pembroke College, Red Building	II	Pembroke College			18 May 1967	TL4490058013; 52°12′05″N 0°07′08″E		1087084	Upload Photo	Q26379561
Pembroke College, Screen Entrance from Trumpington Street Between the Chapel and the Red Building	II	Pembroke College			2 November 1972	TL4488358028; 52°12′05″N 0°07′07″E		1332189	Upload Photo	Q26617019
Pembroke College, Statue of William Pitt the Younger Outside the Library	II	Pembroke College	statue		2 November 1972	TL4493358049; 52°12′06″N 0°07′10″E		1087088	Pembroke College, Statue of William Pitt the Younger Outside the Library More images	Q26379565
Pembroke College, Sundial in New Court	II	Pembroke College			2 November 1972	TL4498958126; 52°12′08″N 0°07′13″E		1335828	Upload Photo	Q26620388
Pembroke College, the Buildings Surrounding Old Court (except the Chapel and Cloister) and Ivy Court	I	Pembroke College	architectural structure		26 April 1950	TL4486258069; 52°12′07″N 0°07′06″E		1087104	Pembroke College, the Buildings Surrounding Old Court (except the Chapel and Cloister) and Ivy Court More images	Q17527276
Pembroke College, the Chapel with Hitcham's Cloister	I	Pembroke College	chapel		26 April 1950	TL4489258042; 52°12′06″N 0°07′07″E		1125509	Pembroke College, the Chapel with Hitcham's Cloister More images	Q17527331
Pembroke College, Wall, Gateway and Screen Between Ivy Court and New Court	II	Pembroke College			2 November 1972	TL4494758072; 52°12′07″N 0°07′10″E		1332190	Upload Photo	Q26617020

=== Peterhouse ===
Name	Grade	Location	Type	Completed	Date designated	Grid ref. Geo-coordinates	Notes	Entry number	Image	Wikidata
Peterhouse, Entrance Screen to First Court	I	Peterhouse	architectural structure		2 November 1972	TL4490057982; 52°12′04″N 0°07′08″E		1125514	Peterhouse, Entrance Screen to First Court More images	Q17527335
Peterhouse, Gates and Piers of the Master's Lodge	I	Peterhouse			2 November 1972	TL4491157989; 52°12′04″N 0°07′08″E		1332192	Upload Photo	Q77062270
Peterhouse, Outbuilding to North East of Master's Lodge	II	Peterhouse			2 November 1972	TL4493358027; 52°12′05″N 0°07′10″E		1087035	Upload Photo	Q26379520
William Stone Building	II	Peterhouse College, Trumpington Street	residential building		30 March 1993	TL4497957734; 52°11′56″N 0°07′12″E		1265227	William Stone Building More images	Q18395000
Peterhouse, the Buildings Surrounding First Court, Old Court and Gisborne Court	I	Peterhouse			26 April 1950	TL4483357943; 52°12′03″N 0°07′04″E		1087054	Upload Photo	Q17527268
Peterhouse, the Master's Lodge	I	Peterhouse			26 April 1950	TL4493358002; 52°12′04″N 0°07′10″E		1087070	Upload Photo	Q17527272
Fen Court at Peterhouse	II	Trumpington Street			23 January 2003	TL4478057942; 52°12′03″N 0°07′01″E		1350395	Upload Photo	Q26633606
Peterhouse, West Boundary Wall of the Grove	II	Peterhouse			26 April 1950	TL4483257880; 52°12′00″N 0°07′04″E		1125513	Upload Photo	Q26418514

=== Sidney Sussex College ===
Name	Grade	Location	Type	Completed	Date designated	Grid ref. Geo-coordinates	Notes	Entry number	Image	Wikidata
Sidney Sussex College, Cloister Court	II*	Sidney Sussex College	college of the University of Cambridge		18 May 1967	TL4497058735; 52°12′28″N 0°07′13″E		1125496	Sidney Sussex College, Cloister Court More images	Q327116
Sidney Sussex College, East Boundary Wall Flanking Malcom Street	II	Sidney Sussex College			2 November 1972	TL4507258804; 52°12′30″N 0°07′18″E		1125497	Upload Photo	Q26418505
Sidney Sussex College, Gateway Entrance from Jesus Lane to the College Garden	II	Sidney Sussex College			26 April 1950	TL4506658824; 52°12′31″N 0°07′18″E		1106363	Upload Photo	Q26400232
Sidney Sussex College, the Buildings Surrounding Hall Court and Chapel Court	I	Sidney Sussex College	architectural structure		26 April 1950	TL4498858679; 52°12′26″N 0°07′14″E		1106237	Sidney Sussex College, the Buildings Surrounding Hall Court and Chapel Court More images	Q17527291
Sidney Sussex College, Walls Fronting Sidney Street, Wall of Hall Court, Wall of Chapel Court	II	Sidney Sussex College			2 November 1972	TL4495158675; 52°12′26″N 0°07′12″E		1125495	Upload Photo	Q26418504

== See also ==
- Grade I listed buildings in Cambridgeshire
- Grade II* listed buildings in Cambridgeshire

== Sources ==
- Bradley, Simon; Pevsner, Nikolaus (2014) [1954], Cambridgeshire, The Buildings of England, New Haven and London: Yale University Press, ISBN 978-0-300-20596-1
