= Grade II* listed buildings in Cambridgeshire =

Cambridgeshire shown within England

The county of Cambridgeshire is divided into six districts. The districts of Cambridgeshire are Cambridge, South Cambridgeshire, Huntingdonshire, Fenland, East Cambridgeshire and Peterborough (unitary).

As there are 488 Grade II* listed buildings in the county they have been split into separate lists for each district.

- Grade II* listed buildings in Cambridge
- Grade II* listed buildings in South Cambridgeshire
- Grade II* listed buildings in Huntingdonshire
- Grade II* listed buildings in Fenland
- Grade II* listed buildings in East Cambridgeshire
- Grade II* listed buildings in Peterborough (unitary)

== See also ==
- Grade I listed buildings in Cambridgeshire
