= Nene Viaduct =

Railway viaduct in the East of England

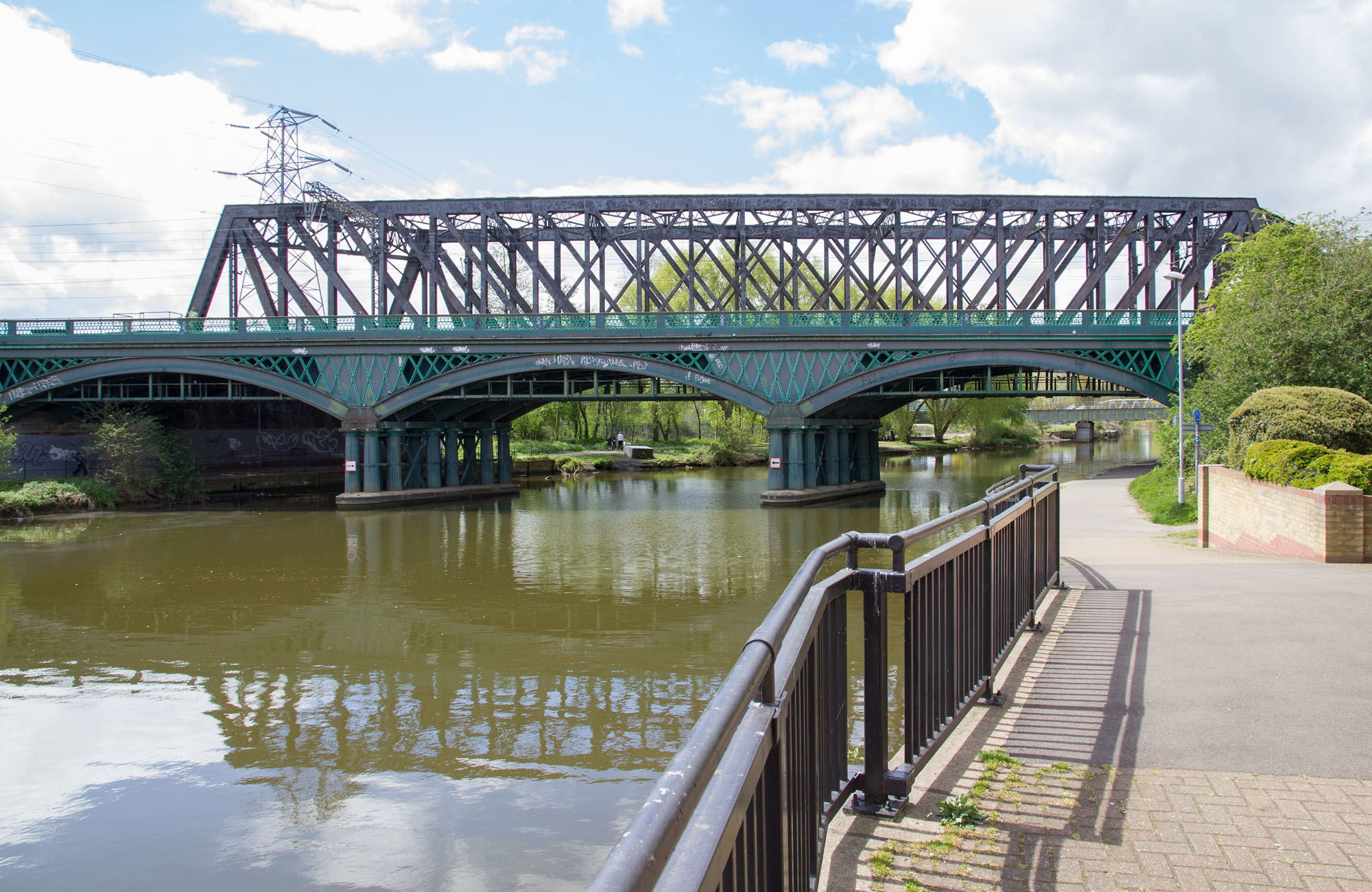
- The viaduct from the River Nene
- Coordinates: 52.568347°N 0.245527°W
- Carries: East Coast Main Line
- Crosses: River Nene
- Locale: Peterborough, England
- Named for: River Nene
- Owner: Network Rail
- Maintained by: Network Rail
- Heritage status: Grade II* listed

Rail characteristics
- No. of tracks: 2
- Electrified: Yes

History
- Architect: William Cubitt, Joseph Cubitt
- Built: 1850

Location
- Interactive map of Nene Viaduct

The Nene Viaduct is a railway viaduct that carries the East Coast Main Line on the River Nene in the East of England. It is situated approximated 1 mile (1.6 km) to the south of Peterborough railway station, and its two tracks still carry high-speed trains in the modern day. It has been Grade II* listed since 1998.

Built to carry the Great Northern Railway, the viaduct was designed by engineers William Cubitt and Joseph Cubitt, with construction finishing in 1850 as one of the last parts of the track between London and Werrington to be laid. The viaduct was strengthened in 1910 and 1914 and blue engineering brick has been added to some parts since the viaduct was built. When the line was quadrupled in 1924, a second bridge was constructed which is attached to the abutments of the first. However, this is not considered to be part of the structure.

The viaduct is owned and maintained by Network Rail, forming part of its Strategic Route Section G.01, which covers the East Coast Main Line and North East route between London Kings Cross and Peterborough. The overhead electrification supplies a 25kV AC current to electric trains.

== Design ==
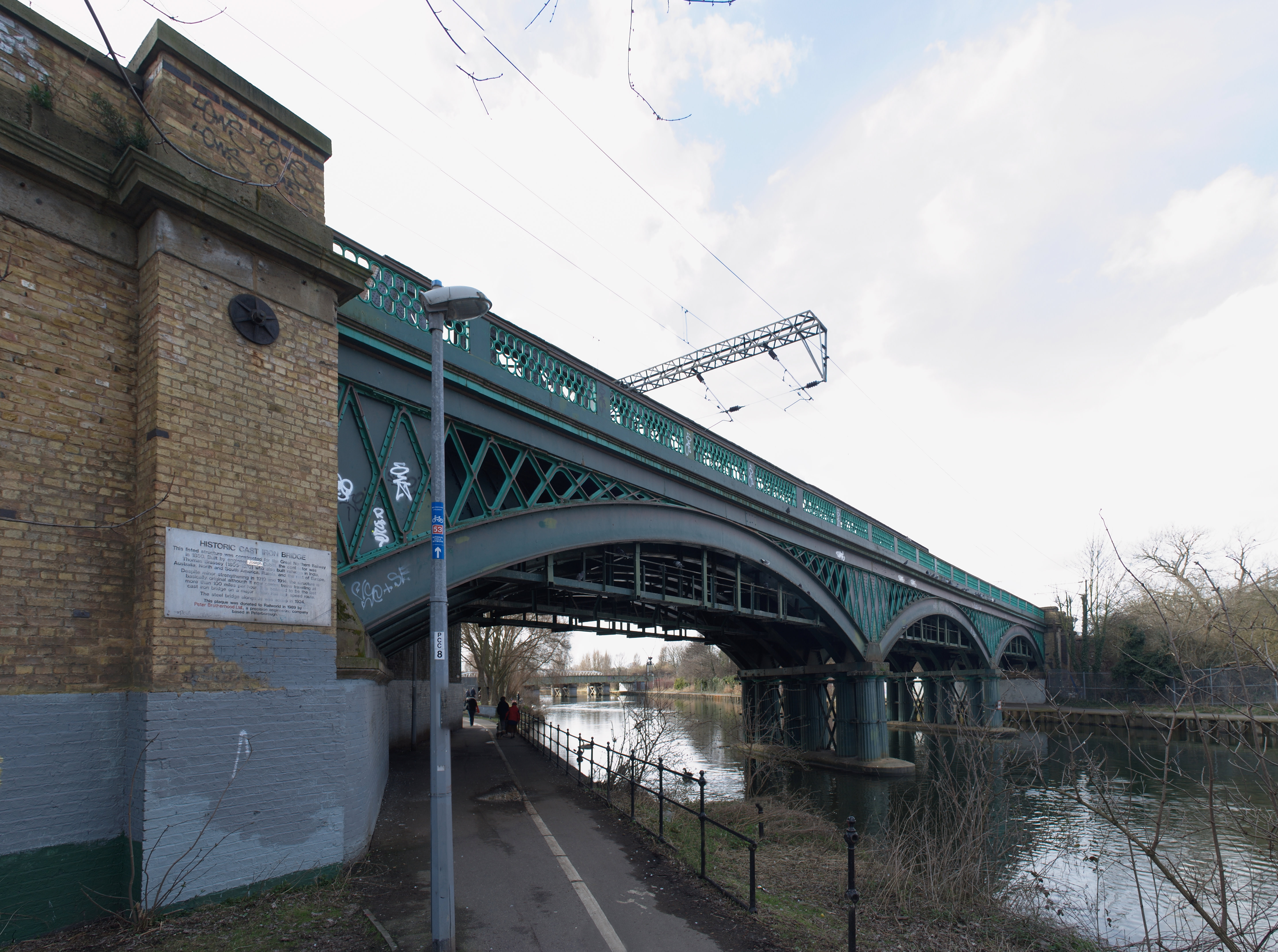
A close-up view of the viaduct from the riverbank

The East Coast Main Line is a railway that runs between Kings Cross in London and Edinburgh Waverley stations, and it forms a vital part of the UK's railway network. The viaduct is bridge number 184 on the line, and where the Up lines (southbound towards London) cross the River Nene approximated 1 mile (1.6 km) to the south of Peterborough railway station, which serves the city of the same name.

The bridge has three arches, which are built from cast iron, and white brick and stone facings. The viaduct's abutments were originally built from white brick, although some have had blue engineering brick added to them as well. The abutments are adorned with details moulded from ashlar stone, and the side sections' bricks are blue and surround the arches.

The viaduct comprises three arches, which are each formed from six curved girders. These are supported by two sets of twelve cast iron columns, which are fluted in the Doric style, but lack bases. The columns stand on two cast iron caissons sunk into the riverbed, and an ornate iron balustrade tops the bridge. This stands out clearly in contrast to the second bridge, which is not considered part of the viaduct.

The viaduct forms part of a longer section of embankment and bridges; immediately to the south of the viaduct and the parallel truss bridge, there are two more parallel truss bridges. These carry two tracks of the East Coast Main Line each over the Hereward Line which connects Peterborough to Ely. These are separated by a short section of embankment.

== History ==
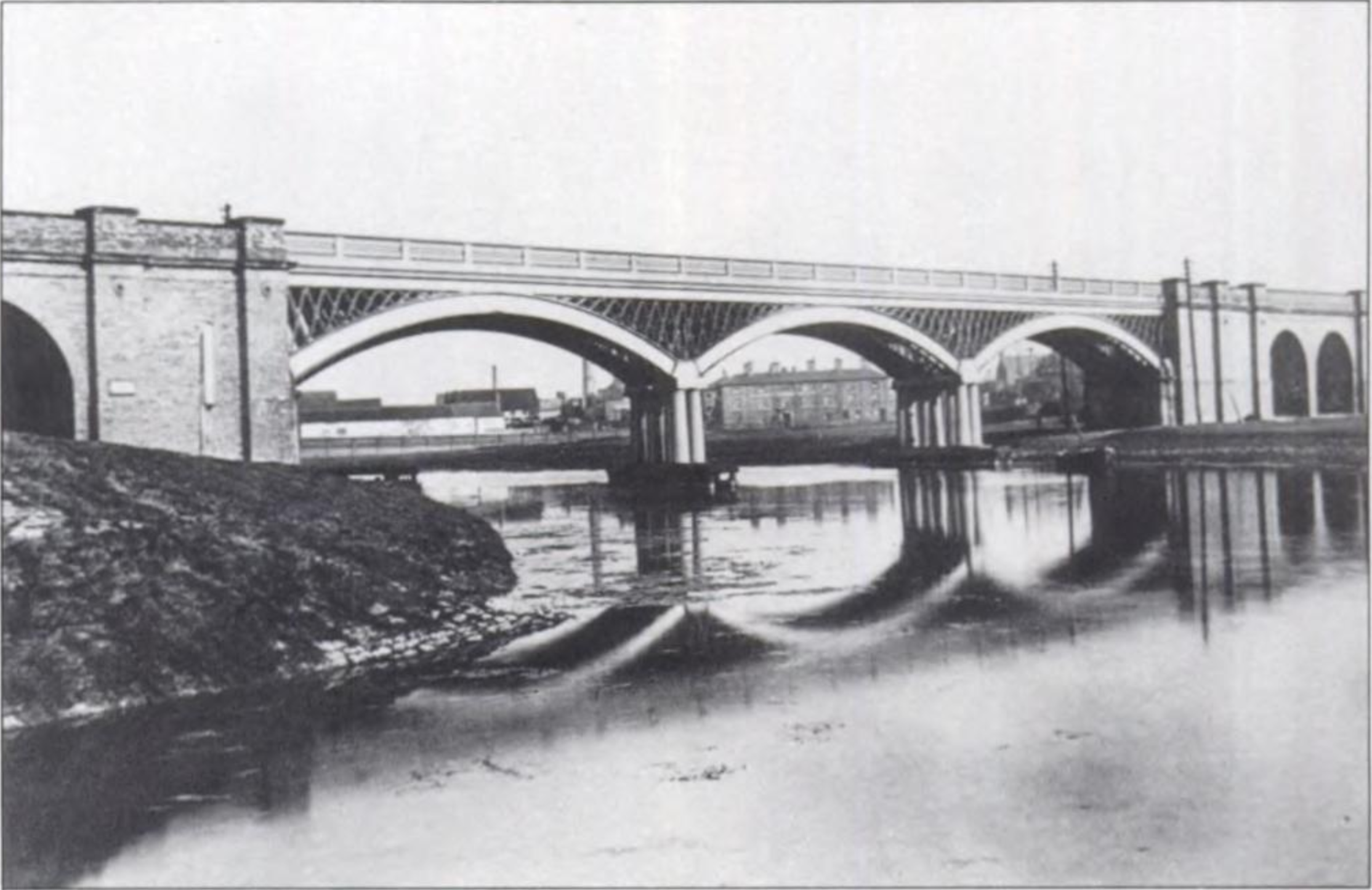
The viaduct photographed before the second bridge was added

The viaduct was built in 1850 to carry the Great Northern Railway over the River Nene. It was designed by railway engineer William Cubitt and his son Joseph Cubitt, and built by contractor Thomas Brassey. The construction process for the bridge began with sinking the caissons into the riverbed, which then formed a stable base on which the columns would be supported. These were then used to support the metal spans and the brick abutments, which were built on the riverbanks.

On 29–30 July 1850, George Wynne of the Royal Engineers inspected the Great Northern Railway between London and Werrington. He found that the track bed was yet to be laid over the viaduct as well as in other places, and so deemed the line unsafe for use. At the time, the expected completion date for the track bed was 2 August. The line between Kings Cross and Peterborough began demonstrative operations on 5 August and eight passenger trains per day from 7 August.

On 21 August 1865, a collision occurred on the viaduct when a goods train could not properly climb the gradient south of Peterborough railway station, and was hit by another goods train travelling behind it. There were no serious injuries or deaths; the viaduct sustained minor damages as a result of the accident. The viaduct was strengthened using steel ties, first in 1910 and then again in 1914. On 1 January 1923, the Great Northern Railway and its assets were amalgamated into the London and North Eastern Railway (LNER), one of the "big four" railway companies.

When Peterborough gained new railway links in 1924, the railway was expanded from two tracks to four tracks, and thus a second bridge was built to the west of the viaduct to carry these across the River Nene. The second bridge is a steel truss bridge called a Whipple Murphy truss bridge; whilst it is abutted to the viaduct, it is not considered part of it and is not a listed structure. The trusses of the second bridge have been claimed to "dominate" the view and negate from the viaduct's contribution to the landscape.

On 1 January 1948, British Railways was created as a publicly-owned amalgamation of the "big four" companies including all of their assets. It then changed hands once again as part of the privatisation of British Rail when Railtrack was formally established as a private company on 1 April 1994. It absorbed British Rail's infrastructure, including track, stations, signalling, bridges, and tunnels. The viaduct has been Grade II* listed since 24 October 1998, meaning that it is a "particularly important [structure] of special interest".

On 3 October 2003, Network Rail succeeded Railtrack due to their troubled history including crashes at Hatfield, Southall, and Ladbroke Grove. As part of the handover, Network Rail was given all of Railtrack's assets and the responsibility for their maintenance. As of 2024, the viaduct is still used by modern high-speed trains every day; it is also the last example of cast-iron engineering that is still in use on a mainline railway, and this is recognised by a plaque on the bridge. It has been listed by author Lorna Talbott as one of the fifty most defining structures in Peterborough. The viaduct has also been noted for passengers' ability to see Peterborough Cathedral from their train as it passes over.

== See also ==
- Grade II* listed buildings in Peterborough
- Infrastructure of the East Coast Main Line
- List of railway bridges and viaducts in the United Kingdom
