= Grade II* listed buildings in Fenland =

There are over 20,000 Grade II* listed buildings in England. This page is a list of these buildings in the district of Fenland in Cambridgeshire.

== List ==
Name	Location	Type	Completed (Note: The date given is the date used by Historic England as significant for the initial building or that of an important part in the structure's description.)	Date designated	Grid ref. (Note: The grid reference is based on the British national grid reference system, sometimes known as OSGB36, used by the Ordnance Survey.) Geo-coordinates	Entry number (Note: The "List Entry Number" is a unique number assigned to each listed building and scheduled monument by Historic England.)	Image
Parish Church of St Mary	Doddington, Fenland	Parish Church	Mid 13th century	25 October 1951	TL4001990557; 52°29′42″N 0°03′40″E	1126575	Parish Church of St Mary More images
Elm House	Elm, Fenland	House	c. 1630	23 June 1952	TF4711407012; 52°38′27″N 0°10′22″E	1125941	Upload Photo
Park House	Leverington, Fenland	House	slightly earlier	23 June 1952	TF4356211995; 52°41′12″N 0°07′21″E	1310313	Upload Photo
Norland House	March, Fenland	Apartment	1985	22 February 1985	TL4166796200; 52°32′43″N 0°05′16″E	1216221	Upload Photo
38 West End	March, Fenland	House	1626	13 March 1951	TL4136396820; 52°33′03″N 0°05′01″E	1366042	Upload Photo
Church of St James	Newton-in-the-Isle, Fenland	Parish Church	13th century	23 June 1952	TF4402814811; 52°42′42″N 0°07′50″E	1125956	Church of St James More images
Church of St John the Baptist	Parson Drove, Fenland	Church	Late 12th century	23 June 1952	TF3903009088; 52°39′42″N 0°03′15″E	1331998	Church of St John the Baptist More images
Church of St Giles	Tydd St. Giles, Fenland	Parish Church	Late 12th century	23 June 1952	TF4270716472; 52°43′37″N 0°06′42″E	1125926	Church of St Giles More images
Church of St Andrew	Whittlesey, Fenland	Parish Church	13th century	11 August 1950	TL2667396919; 52°33′19″N 0°07′59″W	1227881	Church of St Andrew More images
Grove House	Whittlesey, Fenland	House	c. 1680	11 August 1950	TL2684696771; 52°33′14″N 0°07′50″W	1216541	Grove House
Market Cross	Whittlesey, Fenland	Market Cross	Late 17th century	11 August 1950	TL2703197043; 52°33′23″N 0°07′40″W	1287355	Market Cross More images
Post Office	Whittlesey, Fenland	House	Late 18th century	31 July 1970	TL2702397006; 52°33′22″N 0°07′40″W	1228131	Upload Photo
Vinpenta House	Whittlesey, Fenland	House	c. 1740	11 August 1950	TL2707997074; 52°33′24″N 0°07′37″W	1287392	Upload Photo
Wilderness House	Whittlesey, Fenland	House	Early 18th century	11 August 1950	TL2671196933; 52°33′20″N 0°07′57″W	1287350	Upload Photo
North House	Wimblington, Fenland	House	Late 17th century or early 18th century	25 October 1951	TL4153092145; 52°30′32″N 0°05′02″E	1161423	North House
Clarkson Memorial	Wisbech, Fenland	Statue	1880	10 February 1969	TF4606309627; 52°39′53″N 0°09′30″E	1228597	Clarkson Memorial More images
Dicken's Tavern	Wisbech, Fenland	House	Mid 18th century	10 February 1969	TF4619509787; 52°39′58″N 0°09′38″E	1228928	Upload Photo
Empire Cinema	Wisbech, Fenland	Cinema	1932	31 October 1983	TF4632809744; 52°39′56″N 0°09′45″E	1125906	Empire Cinema
Horace Friend Warehouse Number 2	Wisbech, Fenland	Prison	Early 19th century	10 February 1969	TF4610709744; 52°39′57″N 0°09′33″E	1126629	Horace Friend Warehouse Number 2
Octavia Hill Birthplace Museum	Wisbech, Fenland	House	c. 1740	31 October 1983	TF4595909608; 52°39′52″N 0°09′25″E	1126599	Octavia Hill Birthplace Museum More images
Oldham Chemists	Wisbech, Fenland	Shop	Late 18th century	31 October 1983	TF4618109715; 52°39′56″N 0°09′37″E	1126657	Upload Photo
Former Queen's Hotel	Wisbech, Fenland	House	Early to mid 18th century	31 October 1983	TF4588709577; 52°39′51″N 0°09′21″E	1278862	Former Queen's Hotel More images
Queen's School	Wisbech, Fenland	House	Mid 18th century	31 October 1983	TF4586509564; 52°39′51″N 0°09′20″E	1229902	Upload Photo
Stable to North West of No 15 (Peckover House)	Wisbech, Fenland	Tack Room	Mid to late 18th century	10 February 1969	TF4581109658; 52°39′54″N 0°09′17″E	1126639	Stable to North West of No 15 (Peckover House)
The Castle	Wisbech, Fenland	Villa	1816	31 October 1983	TF4622009565; 52°39′51″N 0°09′38″E	1229170	The Castle More images
The Conservative Club	Wisbech, Fenland	Guildhall	c. 1379	31 October 1983	TF4621009759; 52°39′57″N 0°09′38″E	1126681	The Conservative Club More images
The Museum	Wisbech, Fenland	Museum	1846-7	10 February 1969	TF4626009567; 52°39′51″N 0°09′41″E	1126669	The Museum More images
The Rose and Crown Inn	Wisbech, Fenland	Courtyard	Early 17th century	31 October 1983	TF4614209706; 52°39′55″N 0°09′35″E	1126656	The Rose and Crown Inn More images
12 North Street	Wisbech, Fenland	House	Late 18th century	19 November 1976	TF4604109840; 52°40′00″N 0°09′29″E	1126622	12 North Street
1 and 2 Old Market	Wisbech, Fenland	House	Late 18th century	31 October 1983	TF4605509809; 52°39′59″N 0°09′30″E	1229806	Upload Photo
8 and 9 Old Market	Wisbech, Fenland	House	Second half 18th century	10 February 1969	TF4604009761; 52°39′57″N 0°09′29″E	1126590	Upload Photo
32 Old Market	Wisbech, Fenland	House	1723	31 October 1983	TF4597809801; 52°39′59″N 0°09′26″E	1126595	32 Old Market
6 North Brink	Wisbech, Fenland	House	Early 18th century	31 October 1983	TF4593709682; 52°39′55″N 0°09′24″E	1279135	6 North Brink
7 North Brink	Wisbech, Fenland	House	c. 1747	31 October 1983	TF4593009678; 52°39′55″N 0°09′23″E	1126635	7 North Brink
8 and 9 North Brink	Wisbech, Fenland	House	Late 18th century	31 October 1983	TF4592209676; 52°39′55″N 0°09′23″E	1279141	8 and 9 North Brink
12 North Brink	Wisbech, Fenland	House	Early 18th century	31 October 1983	TF4588609670; 52°39′54″N 0°09′21″E	1126637	Upload Photo
19 North Brink	Wisbech, Fenland	House	1983	31 October 1983	TF4583409642; 52°39′54″N 0°09′18″E	1279125	19 North Brink More images
6 The Crescent	Wisbech, Fenland	Terraced House	c. 1793	31 October 1983	TF4619209529; 52°39′50″N 0°09′37″E	1331608	Upload Photo
3 School Lane	Wisbech, Fenland	Town House	1701	31 October 1983	TF4616409816; 52°39′59″N 0°09′36″E	1331650	Upload Photo
Chapel of Ease	Guyhirn, Wisbech St. Mary, Fenland	Chapel of Ease	1983	23 June 1952	TF4014003785; 52°36′50″N 0°04′06″E	1331986	Chapel of Ease More images
Church of St Mary	Wisbech St. Mary, Fenland	Parish Church	14th century	23 June 1952	TF4197108142; 52°39′09″N 0°05′50″E	1161226	Church of St Mary More images
The Manor House	Wisbech St. Mary, Fenland	House	1791	23 June 1952	TF4208508817; 52°39′30″N 0°05′57″E	1125899	The Manor House More images
