= Trumpington War Memorial =

Monument in Trumpington, Cambridgeshire, England

Coordinates: 52.1754°N 0.1126°E

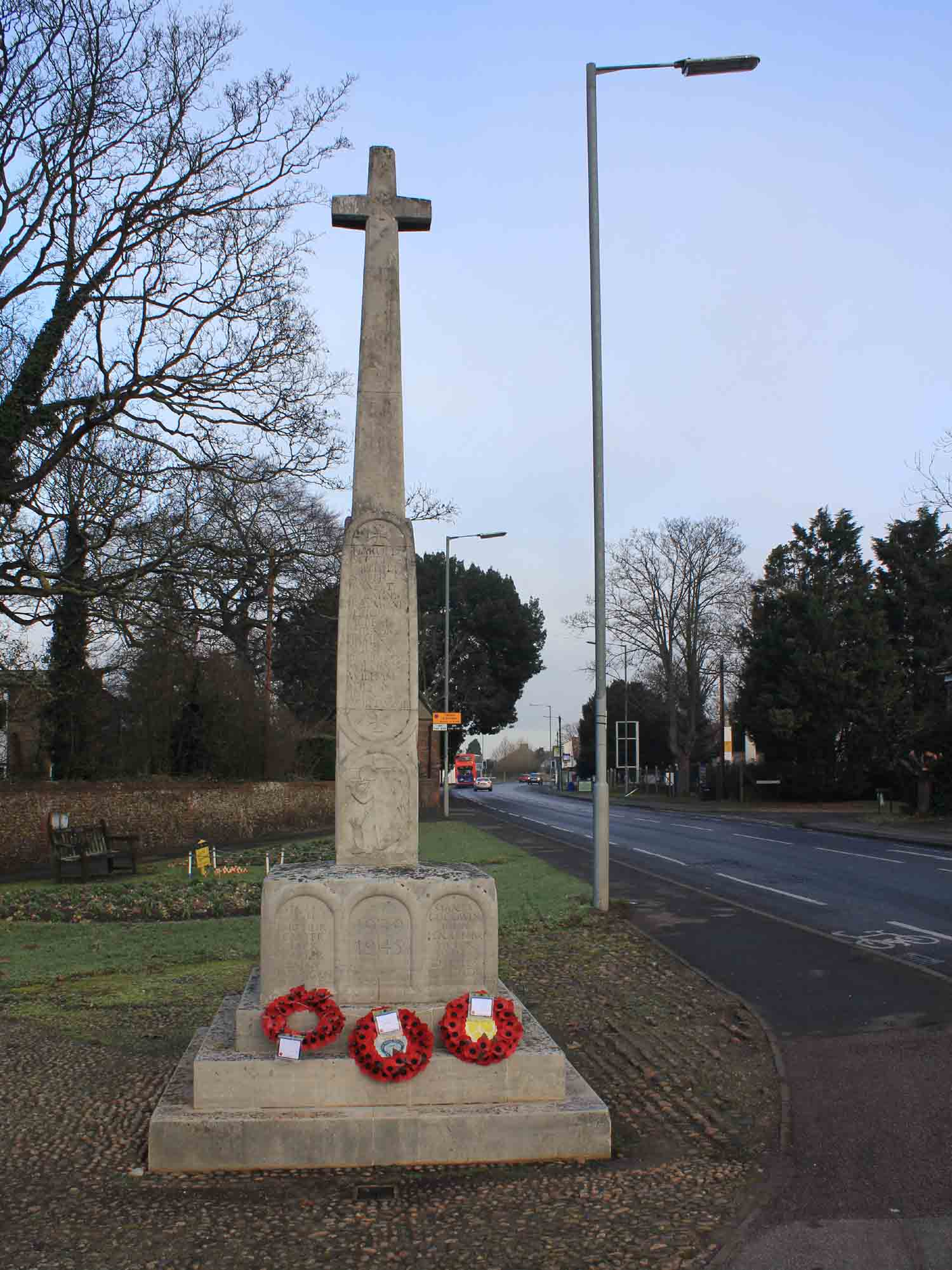

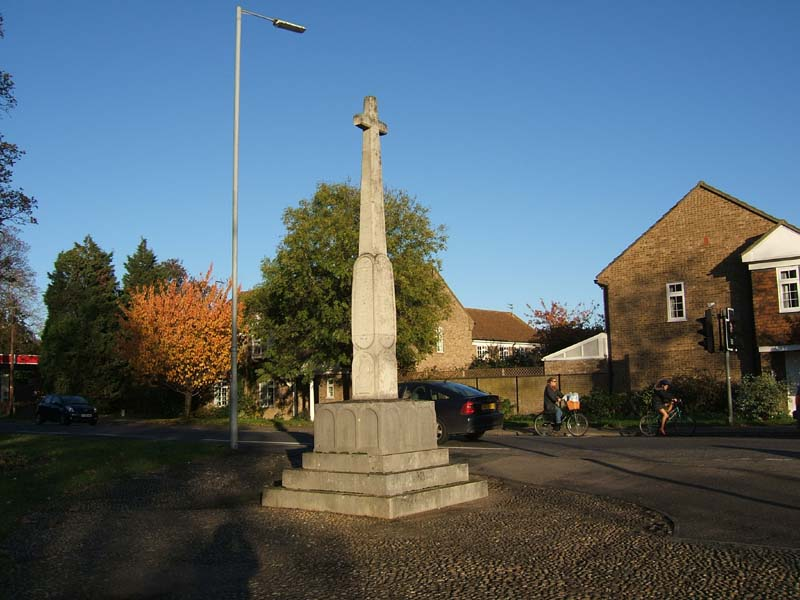

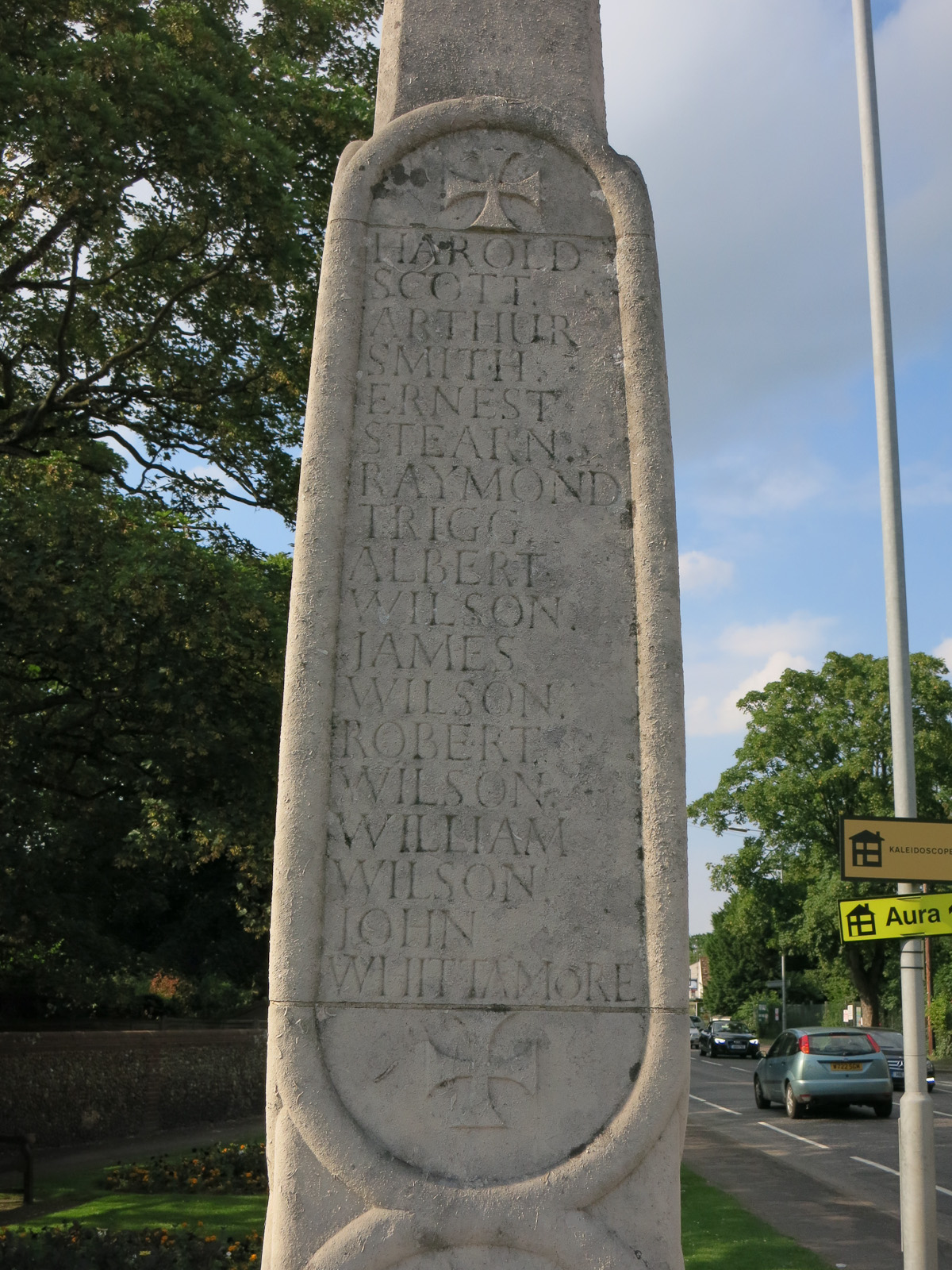
Gill's lettering of the names of the dead

Trumpington War Memorial is a war memorial cross in the village of Trumpington, on the southern outskirts of Cambridge. The memorial was designed by Eric Gill. It was unveiled in 1921, and became a Grade II* listed building in 1999.

Proposals for a war memorial were considered by a sub-committee of the Trumpington parish council in May 1919; members included the parish priest, Rev. Arthur Christopher Moule (former Professor of Chinese at Cambridge University, and son of Bishop George Moule), and the medical doctor William Warburton Wingate (husband of Viola Pemberton, whose family owned Trumpington Hall). Options considered included a memorial garden with tennis courts, a clock tower, and an obelisk, but the committee selected a memorial cross. The cost of the memorial was raised by public subscription, with the Pemberton family contributing £200. Eric Gill was commissioned to make the cross. He had already carved the inscription for a memorial for a member of the Pemberton family at the parish church of St Mary and St Michael nearby.

The memorial is located at a site in the centre of the village, formerly called Cross Hill, at the junction of the High Street, and Church Lane which leads towards the church, becoming Grantchester Road and continuing west towards Grantchester. Originally the cross was located in the road to Grantchester, with the carriageway passing to either side; now it is surrounded by a paved area, with the road passing to the south. During construction, excavation works for the foundations uncovered a large square Barnack stone with a socket, inscribed in memory of John Stockton and his wife Agnes; the stone is believed to be the 13th-century base for a wooden roadside cross, and it is now preserved inside the church.

The memorial is built from Portland stone. It comprises a 14.5 feet (4.4 m) Latin cross standing on a 4 feet (1.2 m) square plinth, itself standing on a square base of three steps.

Each of the four sides of the cross shaft bears two carved and inscribed panels. The lower round-headed panels have high-relief images representing the parish's two patron saints - the Virgin Mary (on the west side, with a baby and cradle) and Saint Michael (on the north side, with wings, slaying a dragon) - and also the patron saint of England Saint George (on the east side, accompanied by a human figure, also slaying a dragon), with the fourth panel to the south showing a tired soldier (this panel based on a David Jones design). The upper panels are elongated ovals, each inscribed with nine names commemorating the 36 men from the village killed in the First World War, with small crosses at the top and bottom.

The four sides of the plinth are decorated with three carved round-headed arches. The east side, towards the High Street, bears the dates "1914" and "1918" in the side arches, with an inscription in the centre arch: "MEN / OF TRUM- / PINGTON / WHO GAVE / THEIR LIVES / IN THE / GREAT / WAR". The south side, towards Church Lane, has the inscribed dates "1939–1945" in the central arch, with the names of 8 war dead from the Second World War in the two side arches (inscriptions added later, probably by David Kindersley). The west side bears the inscription "FOR / LIBERTY / AND / JUSTICE'" in the centre arch, with the ones to either side blank. The arches to the north side bear no inscriptions.

The memorial was unveiled on Sunday 11 December 1921, with a service at the parish church nearby by Rev. Moule. It was renovated in 2014 when a further Second World War name, Lieutenant Jack Neville Creek (Argyll and Sutherland Highlanders) was added.

== See also ==
- Grade II* listed war memorials in England
- John Pendlebury, named among the dead from the Second World War
