= Church of St Cyriac and St Julitta, Swaffham Prior =

Coordinates: 52.2509°N 0.2959°E

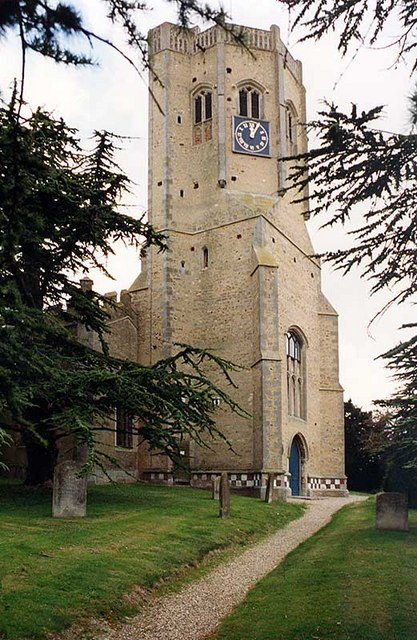
- The tower of the Church of St Cyriac and St Julitta, Swaffham Prior

- Location in Cambridgeshire
- OS grid reference: TL 568 639
- Location: Swaffham Prior, Cambridgeshire
- Country: England
- Denomination: Anglican
- Website: Churches Conservation Trust

History
- Dedication: Saints Cyriac and Julitta

Architecture
- Functional status: Redundant
- Heritage designation: Grade II*
- Designated: 19 August 1959
- Architect: Charles Humfrey
- Architectural type: Church
- Style: Gothic, Gothic Revival

Specifications
- Materials: Tower in flint and clunch with limestone dressings Body in gault brick with stone dressings Roof slated

The Church of St Cyriac and St Julitta is a redundant Anglican church in the village of Swaffham Prior, Cambridgeshire, England. It is recorded in the National Heritage List for England as a designated Grade II* listed building, and is under the care of the Churches Conservation Trust. The church stands in an elevated position above the village street, the B1102 road, some 7 miles (11 km) northeast of Cambridge. It is less than 30 metres (100 ft) from the adjoining Church of St Mary, and both churches share the same churchyard.

== History ==
The church has a dual dedication to Saints Cyriac and Julitta (Quiricus and Julietta), Saint Julitta being the mother of Saint Cyriac. Both this church and the adjacent church of St Mary were established by the early 13th century. Initially separate parishes, their benefices were united in 1667. In 1743 the nave and chancel of St Cyriac's were restored, but by 1783 the church was in a dilapidated state, and services were being held in St Mary's. By the 1790s the roof of St Cyriac's was collapsing, and it was overgrown with ivy. However, in 1779 the tower of St Mary's had been struck by lightning, and in 1802, when builders were working on the tower, part of it collapsed. It was then decided to demolish St Cyriac's church, other than the tower, and rebuild it.

Work began in 1806 to designs by Charles Humfrey of Cambridge. The cost of the work was over £3,100 (equivalent to £240,000 in 2025), and the church was re-consecrated in 1809. Towards the end of the century, work was carried out to restore St Mary's. St Mary's was re-opened in 1903, and it then became the sole parish church. The fabric of St Cyriac's was left to decay, and by the 1960s its ceiling was collapsing. Its tower was restored in 1959–60, and in 1974 the Redundant Churches Fund, the forerunner of the Churches Conservation Trust, spent £10,000 (equivalent to £90,000 in 2025) on repairing and restoring the rest of the church. Since then, it has been used occasionally for exhibitions and concerts. Since 2017, it has been available as a 'champing' church, one of 27 churches in England and Scotland in which you can camp overnight.

Scottish poet Edwin Muir (1887 – 1959) is buried in the churchyard.

== Architecture ==
The tower is constructed in clunch and flint with limestone dressings. The rest of the church is in gault brick with stone dressings. The roof is slated. Its plan consists of a three-bay nave with north and south aisles, north and south transepts, a chancel, and a west tower. The tower is in three stages with buttresses. The lower two stages are square, and the top stage is octagonal. At the northeast angle is a staircase. The tower is set on a plinth with a frieze decorated in a chequerboard pattern in brick and stone. In the bottom stage of the tower is a west doorway, and above this is a three-light window. The top stage contains two-light bell openings on each face. The parapet is decorated with flushwork. At the west end of the church is a gallery. There is a ring of six bells, all cast in 1791 by John Briant. Although St Mary's also has a fine Romanesque tower, only the tower of Ss. Cyriac & Julitta contains bells, and so they are still rung every Sunday for services at St Mary's. As of February 2019, the tenor bell has been deemed 'unringable'.

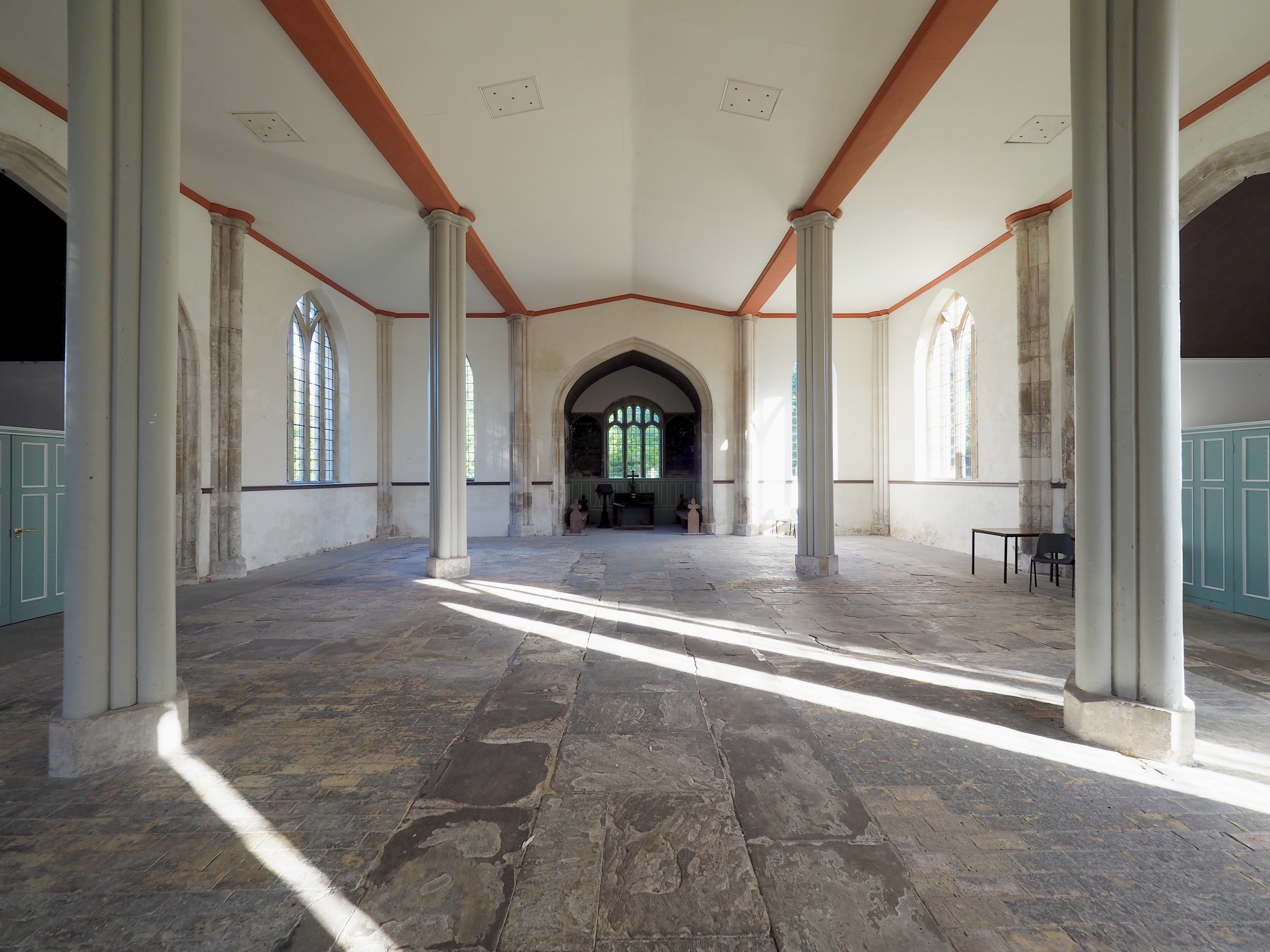
St Cyriac and Julitta from the west looking towards the sanctuary
