= Parson Drove =

Village in Cambridgeshire, England

Coordinates: 52.66°N 0.03°E

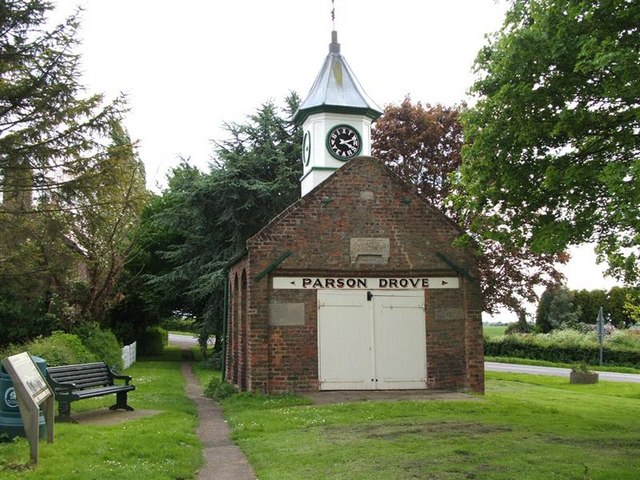
- The Cage, Parson Drove.

- Location within Cambridgeshire
- Population: 1,030 (2001)
- OS grid reference: TF370085
- Civil parish: Parson Drove
- District: Fenland
- Shire county: Cambridgeshire
- Region: East
- Country: England
- Sovereign state: United Kingdom
- Post town: Wisbech
- Postcode district: PE13
- Dialling code: 01945

Parson Drove is a fen village and civil parish in the Isle of Ely, Cambridgeshire, England. A linear settlement, it is 6 miles (10 km) west of Wisbech, the nearest town. The village is named after the central thoroughfare along which the village developed, a green drove, much wider than the current metalled road (B1166). The population at the 2001 Census was 1,030. The city of Peterborough is 19 miles (31 km) to the west, and the town of King's Lynn is 21 miles (34 km) to the east.

== History ==
The area was farmed by the Romans, who left evidence of their presence in several places throughout Parson Drove and the surrounding parish.

Samuel Pepys wrote about Parson Drove in his diary for 17 September 1663, describing it as a "heathen place" where he found his uncle and aunt in a "sad poor thatched cottage", after which he took them to a "miserable inn" (the Swan Inn), where he was staying, and where his uncle's horse was subsequently stolen. A lawyer's clerk from London was, by his uncle and aunt, suspected as the thief, who was then detained at the inn. At about midnight Pepys, after he had retired to a "cold, stony chamber", was informed that the horse was found.

John Peck (1787 – 1851), was a well-known member of the local community. He set up a farm in Parson Drove and later lived at Inham Hall. He served on local drainage boards. He held the office of Parish Constable for 35 years. He kept diaries throughout his life, and these were transcribed in the 1990s and have become a useful source of local history.

== Landmarks ==
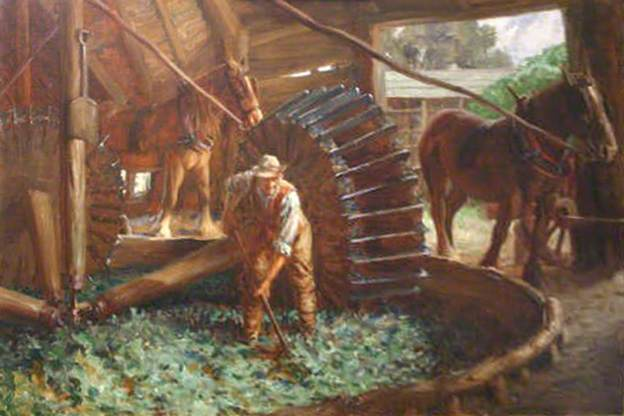
Woad mill, Parson Drove by James Doyle Penrose (1906)

Parson Drove has buildings dating from the 16th century, ten of which are Grade II listed. The village has three public houses, including The Swan Inn, in which Pepys stayed in the 17th century.

The village churches are The Emmanuel Church, Southea (also known as the "New Church") which dates from 1873 and contains chandeliers originally from St Paul's Cathedral , and St John the Baptist (also known as the "Old Church") which dates from the 12th century, and includes additions and renovations from the 14th, 15th, and 17th centuries; it is Grade II* listed, and under the care of the Churches Conservation Trust.

The Cage was built in 1829 as a village lock-up for local criminals and stray livestock, and housed the village fire pump for nearly 100 years.

The last working temporary woad mill in Britain was in Parson Drove. It stood opposite St John the Baptist church, and closed in 1910. It was demolished in 1914 and the last permanent woad mills at Algarkirk (1927) and Skirbeck (1932). A model of the woad mill is in Wisbech & Fenland Museum.

== Education ==
The village is served by the Alderman Payne Primary School - formerly known as the Payne County Primary School, the Payne Council School and the Parson Drove Council School. It is a designated Community School operating under the control of Cambridgeshire County Council. The school is named for Alderman John William Payne.

== Sport ==
The local football club, Parson Drove, play in the Eastern Counties League Division One North.
