= St John the Baptist's Church, Parson Drove =

Coordinates: 52.6617°N 0.0543°E

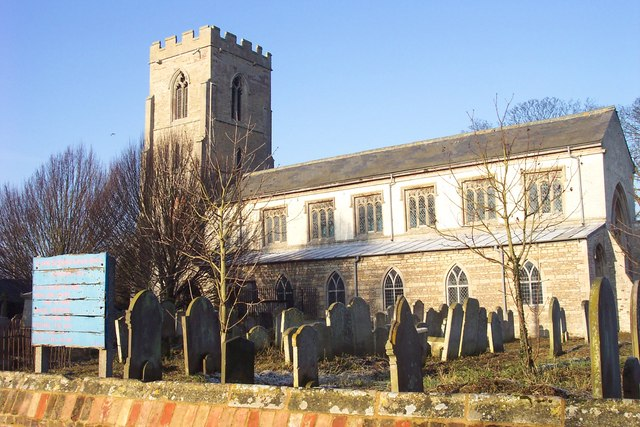
- St John the Baptist's Church, Parson Drove, from the southeast

- Location in Cambridgeshire
- OS grid reference: TF 390 091
- Location: Parson Drove, Cambridgeshire
- Country: England
- Denomination: Anglican
- Website: Churches Conservation Trust

History
- Dedication: Saint John the Baptist

Architecture
- Functional status: Redundant
- Heritage designation: Grade II*
- Designated: 23 June 1952
- Architectural type: Church
- Style: Gothic

St John the Baptist's Church is a redundant Anglican church in the village of Parson Drove, in north Cambridgeshire, England. It is recorded in the National Heritage List for England as a designated Grade II* listed building, and is under the care of the Churches Conservation Trust. The church stands at the east end of the village, on the north side of the B1169 road, some 6 miles (10 km) west of Wisbech.

== History ==
The church was originally a chapelry of Leverington parish. Its earliest substantial part, the north aisle, dates from the 14th century, although there is a north doorway surviving from the previous century. Most of the fabric of the present church is from the late 15th or early 16th century. In 1613 the chancel was destroyed by floods. The south aisle was largely rebuilt about 1800. The south wall of the south aisle was rebuilt in the early part of the 19th century. St John's became a separate parish in 1870. Because of increasing population growth, a second church, Emmanuel Church, was built in the village in 1872. In 1895 the nave roof was reconstructed. By the later part of the 20th century, there was no need for two churches in the village, and in 1974 St John's was declared redundant.

== Architecture ==
=== Exterior ===
The church is constructed mainly in rubble stone and brick. The tower is partly faced with Barnack limestone. The roof of the nave is slated, and the aisles and south porch are roofed in lead. Its plan consists of a nave with a clerestory, north and south aisles with a vestry at the east end of the north aisle, north and south porches, a chancel, and a west tower. The tower is in three stages on a plinth. It has angle buttresses, an embattled parapet, and a stair turret on the northeast. In the lowest stage is a west doorway and, at a higher level, three-light windows on the north, south and west sides. There is a lancet window on each side of the middle stage. The bell openings have two lights. Beneath the parapet, the cornice has two gargoyles on each side. On the south side of the plinth is a re-used 12th-century stone carved with the figure of a man. Along the clerestory on each side are six three-light square-headed windows. The south aisle has a three-light east window, six two-light windows along the south wall, and a two-light west window. The south porch has two-light windows in its east and west walls. The north aisle includes a three-light east window, five two-light windows along the north wall, and a two-light west window. The east window in the chancel has three lights.

=== Interior ===
Inside the church, both arcades have seven bays. The lower stage of the tower internally has vaulting carved with devices including Tudor roses and grotesques. In the body of the church, the roofs have corbels carved with grotesque heads. In the north aisle is a piscina with a sharply pointed head. The oak pulpit is dated 1677, and stands on a 20th-century deal base. The octagonal font is from the 15th century, and is Perpendicular in style. Also in the church is an iron-bound chest dating from the 16th or 17th century. There are fragments of 15th-century stained glass in three of the windows of the north aisle. Each consists of a shield, one bearing the arms of the Diocese of Ely, one representing the Trinity, and the third containing three chalices and wafers. There is a ring of five bells cast in or about 1787 by Thomas Osborn.

== Associated features ==
In the Wisbech and Fenland Museum is a pillar piscina that was formerly in the church. It was donated to the museum in 1872.

== See also ==
- List of churches preserved by the Churches Conservation Trust in the East of England
