= Grade II* listed buildings in Peterborough (unitary) =

There are over 20,000 Grade II* listed buildings in England. This page is a list of these buildings in the district of Peterborough in Cambridgeshire.

== List ==
Name	Location	Type	Completed (Note: The date given is the date used by Historic England as significant for the initial building or that of an important part in the structure's description.)	Date designated	Grid ref. (Note: The grid reference is based on the British national grid reference system, sometimes known as OSGB36, used by the Ordnance Survey.) Geo-coordinates	Entry number (Note: The "List Entry Number" is a unique number assigned to each listed building and scheduled monument by Historic England.)	Image
7 Station Road	Barnack, City of Peterborough	House	Late 16th century or early 17th century	19 March 1962	TF0814005294; 52°38′05″N 0°24′13″W	1226449	Upload Photo
Castor House	Castor, City of Peterborough	Bishops Palace	18th century	15 December 1955	TL1275298208; 52°34′12″N 0°20′16″W	1162854	Upload Photo
Durobrivae and Pump Against South Wall of Kitchen	Castor, City of Peterborough	Kitchen	Early 18th century	15 December 1955	TL1223998577; 52°34′24″N 0°20′43″W	1331585	Durobrivae and Pump Against South Wall of Kitchen More images
Gates, Gate Piers and Flanking Garden Boundary Walls to South of Castor House	Castor, City of Peterborough	Gate	Late 17th century	15 December 1955	TL1274398185; 52°34′11″N 0°20′17″W	1126842	Upload Photo
Lodge on Peterborough Drive North East of Ferryhill Plantation	Milton Park, Castor, City of Peterborough	Lodge	1791	15 December 1955	TL1500698782; 52°34′29″N 0°18′16″W	1126840	Upload Photo
Old Laundry to South East of Milton Hall	Milton Park, Castor, City of Peterborough	Flats	c. 1700	15 December 1955	TL1454299814; 52°35′03″N 0°18′39″W	1309470	Upload Photo
Orangery to South East of Kitchen Garden to Milton Hall	Milton Park, Castor, City of Peterborough	Orangery	c. 1791	24 February 1982	TL1465499587; 52°34′55″N 0°18′33″W	1309489	Upload Photo
Range of Stables and Smithy to East of Milton Hall	Milton Park, Castor, City of Peterborough	Stable	1720	15 December 1955	TL1457199860; 52°35′04″N 0°18′37″W	1309500	Upload Photo
Bridge over the River Welland	Deeping Gate, City of Peterborough	Bridge	1651	6 May 1952	TF1507109497; 52°40′16″N 0°17′59″W	1360154	Bridge over the River Welland More images
Manor House	Etton, City of Peterborough	House	16th century	15 December 1955	TF1411106615; 52°38′43″N 0°18′54″W	1126822	Upload Photo
Woodcroft Castle	Etton, City of Peterborough	Castle	Late 13th century	15 December 1955	TF1400604502; 52°37′35″N 0°19′02″W	1126782	Woodcroft Castle More images
Northolme House	Eye, City of Peterborough	House	C16/17	15 December 1955	TF2301404332; 52°37′22″N 0°11′03″W	1365659	Upload Photo
Manor House	Glinton, City of Peterborough	House	Circa 1630-40	15 December 1955	TF1562205944; 52°38′20″N 0°17′34″W	1126792	Manor House More images
Stables immediately North North West of Manor House	Glinton, City of Peterborough	Stable	17th century	15 December 1955	TF1561105957; 52°38′21″N 0°17′35″W	1317981	Upload Photo
Clare Cottage	Helpston, City of Peterborough	House	C17/early 18th century	15 December 1955	TF1212205333; 52°38′03″N 0°20′41″W	1331603	Clare Cottage More images
Lolham Bridges	Helpston, City of Peterborough	Bridge	1642	15 December 1955	TF1114807093; 52°39′01″N 0°21′31″W	1365654	Lolham Bridges More images
Market Cross	Helpston, City of Peterborough	Market Cross	14th century	15 December 1955	TF1216705446; 52°38′07″N 0°20′38″W	1164278	Market Cross More images
Marholm Farmhouse	Marholm, City of Peterborough	Farmhouse	17th century	25 February 1950	TF1498802366; 52°36′25″N 0°18′12″W	1317528	Upload Photo
Ferry Bridge	Orton Waterville, City of Peterborough	Bridge	1716	15 December 1955	TL1433498459; 52°34′19″N 0°18′52″W	1126812	Ferry Bridge More images
Greystones	Peakirk, City of Peterborough	House	18th century	15 December 1955	TF1691606471; 52°38′36″N 0°16′25″W	1221470	Upload Photo
Gatepiers North North East of Thorney Abbey and Abbey House	Thorney, City of Peterborough	Gate Pier	Late 17th century	24 February 1982	TF2819204202; 52°37′14″N 0°06′28″W	1331264	Upload Photo
Gatepiers North North West of Thorney Abbey and Abbey House	Thorney, City of Peterborough	Gate Pier	Late 17th century	24 February 1982	TF2816604190; 52°37′13″N 0°06′29″W	1127482	Upload Photo
Manor House	Thornhaugh, City of Peterborough	Manor House	17th century	19 March 1962	TF0672900533; 52°35′32″N 0°25′33″W	1127458	Upload Photo
Sacrewell Mill and Mill House and Stables	Thornhaugh, City of Peterborough	Garage	1982	28 November 1972	TF0789000063; 52°35′16″N 0°24′32″W	1127493	Sacrewell Mill and Mill House and Stables More images
Sibberton Lodge	Thornhaugh, City of Peterborough	House	Medieval	19 March 1962	TL0630399914; 52°35′12″N 0°25′57″W	1331255	Upload Photo
Flats Nos 1 to 8	Ufford, City of Peterborough	Flats	1982	19 March 1962	TF0930204385; 52°37′34″N 0°23′12″W	1127469	Upload Photo
The Old Rectory	Ufford, City of Peterborough	House	18th century	19 March 1962	TF0938104026; 52°37′23″N 0°23′08″W	1225771	Upload Photo
Garden and Boiler Houses immediately South East of Ufford Hall	Ufford, City of Peterborough	Garden House	18th century	19 March 1962	TF0932904327; 52°37′33″N 0°23′11″W	1357427	Upload Photo
Gatepiers and Wall adjoining South of Stables at Ufford Hall	Ufford, City of Peterborough	Gate Pier	Late 18th century	24 February 1982	TF0931504371; 52°37′34″N 0°23′11″W	1066548	Upload Photo
Wall, Gates and Gatepiers to East of Ufford Hall between Stables to North and Garden House to South	Ufford, City of Peterborough	Gate	18th century	24 February 1982	TF0933104353; 52°37′33″N 0°23′10″W	1127470	Upload Photo
Great North Road Bridge carrying North Bound Carriageway over the River Nene	Wansford, City of Peterborough	Road Bridge	1925-28	14 October 1991	TL0762999368; 52°34′53″N 0°24′47″W	1331276	Great North Road Bridge carrying North Bound Carriageway over the River Nene More images
Barn adjoining North of Wothorpe Farmhouse	Wothorpe, City of Peterborough	Barn	17th century	19 March 1962	TF0243405258; 52°38′07″N 0°29′16″W	1127451	Upload Photo
Disused Grandstand to Former Race Course	Wothorpe, City of Peterborough	Grandstand	1766	10 April 1981	TF0358304146; 52°37′31″N 0°28′16″W	1127413	Upload Photo
Wothorpe Farmhouse	Wothorpe, City of Peterborough	Farmhouse	17th century	19 March 1962	TF0243505236; 52°38′07″N 0°29′16″W	1265974	Upload Photo
Barn to Oxney Farmhouse	Oxney, City of Peterborough	Barn	17th century	7 February 1952	TF2250000973; 52°35′34″N 0°11′35″W	1126924	Upload Photo
Church of All Saints	Peterborough, City of Peterborough	Church	1901	7 May 1973	TF1943400007; 52°35′05″N 0°14′19″W	1126985	Church of All Saints More images
Crescent Waggon Repair Shop	City of Peterborough	Railway Wagon Works	c. 1870	12 January 2001	TL1855798688; 52°34′23″N 0°15′07″W	1334940	Crescent Waggon Repair Shop
Deanery	Peterborough, City of Peterborough	House	12th century	7 February 1952	TL1946298537; 52°34′18″N 0°14′19″W	1126929	Deanery More images
Great Northern Railway Bridge Number 184	Peterborough, City of Peterborough	Railway Viaduct	1850	24 October 1988	TL1903498140; 52°34′05″N 0°14′43″W	1126894	Great Northern Railway Bridge Number 184 More images
Old Guild Hall	Peterborough, City of Peterborough	Guildhall	1671	7 February 1952	TL1915998643; 52°34′21″N 0°14′35″W	1126990	Old Guild Hall More images
Oxney Farmhouse	Oxney, City of Peterborough	Farmhouse	14th century	7 February 1952	TF2245900941; 52°35′33″N 0°11′37″W	1162109	Upload Photo
The Rectory	Paston, City of Peterborough	House	circa C13-C14	7 February 1952	TF1832902224; 52°36′18″N 0°15′15″W	1126925	Upload Photo
10 Queen Street	Peterborough, City of Peterborough	Building	18th century	7 February 1952	TL1904698687; 52°34′23″N 0°14′41″W	1331523	10 Queen Street
12 and 12a Minster Precincts	Peterborough, City of Peterborough	House	13th century core	7 February 1952	TL1936898722; 52°34′24″N 0°14′24″W	1310073	12 and 12a Minster Precincts
Pearl Centre war memorial	Orton Waterville, City of Peterborough	War Memorial	1921	19 March 2019	TL1407596510	1462803	Pearl Centre war memorial
