= Grade II* listed buildings in Huntingdonshire =

There are over 20,000 Grade II* listed buildings in England. This page is a list of these buildings in the district of Huntingdonshire in Cambridgeshire.

== List ==
Name	Location	Type	Completed (Note: The date given is the date used by Historic England as significant for the initial building or that of an important part in the structure's description.)	Date designated	Grid ref. (Note: The grid reference is based on the British national grid reference system, sometimes known as OSGB36, used by the Ordnance Survey.) Geo-coordinates	Entry number (Note: The "List Entry Number" is a unique number assigned to each listed building and scheduled monument by Historic England.)	Image
Church of St Margaret	Abbotsley, Huntingdonshire	Church	16th century	14 May 1959	TL2277556538; 52°11′36″N 0°12′19″W	1210868	Church of St Margaret More images
Manor Farmhouse	Alconbury, Huntingdonshire	Farmhouse	Early to mid 17th century	21 July 1951	TL1849876081; 52°22′12″N 0°15′39″W	1130210	Upload Photo
Milepost	Alconbury Weston, Huntingdonshire	Milepost	c. 1770	21 October 1983	TL1863078130; 52°23′18″N 0°15′30″W	1130211	Milepost More images
Alwalton Lodge	Alwalton, Huntingdonshire	House	Early 19th century	16 November 1988	TL1344596095; 52°33′03″N 0°19′42″W	1130085	Alwalton Lodge More images
The Manor House	Alwalton, Huntingdonshire	Manor House	Early 17th century to Mid 17th century	25 September 1951	TL1348296172; 52°33′06″N 0°19′40″W	1164628	Upload Photo
Parish Church of St Giles	Barham, Barham and Woolley, Huntingdonshire	Parish Church	Late 12th century	28 January 1958	TL1370575466; 52°21′56″N 0°19′53″W	1130126	Parish Church of St Giles More images
Bluntisham House	Bluntisham, Huntingdonshire	Vicarage	c. 1720	24 October 1951	TL3681774494; 52°21′05″N 0°00′26″E	1162482	Bluntisham House More images
Stapenhill	Bluntisham, Huntingdonshire	Farmhouse	Mid 18th century	30 May 1958	TL3677274620; 52°21′09″N 0°00′24″E	1309640	Upload Photo
Walnut Trees	Bluntisham, Huntingdonshire	House	18th century	24 October 1951	TL3673974845; 52°21′17″N 0°00′23″E	1330735	Upload Photo
Parish Church of All Saints	Brington, Brington and Molesworth, Huntingdonshire	Parish Church	14th century	28 January 1958	TL0825775958; 52°22′16″N 0°24′41″W	1130131	Parish Church of All Saints More images
Parish Church of St Peter	Molesworth, Brington and Molesworth, Huntingdonshire	Sundial	Late 13th century	28 January 1958	TL0702475805; 52°22′11″N 0°25′46″W	1130132	Parish Church of St Peter More images
The Old Manor House	Brington, Brington and Molesworth, Huntingdonshire	Farmhouse	Mid 16th century	9 March 1973	TL0847375989; 52°22′16″N 0°24′29″W	1317752	Upload Photo
Parish Church of All Saints	Broughton, Huntingdonshire	Parish Church	12th century	30 May 1958	TL2806377907; 52°23′03″N 0°07′11″W	1128531	Parish Church of All Saints More images
Outer Gateway and Boundary Wall, 50, High St	Buckden, Huntingdonshire	Boundary Wall	Late 15th century	24 October 1951	TL1916767696; 52°17′40″N 0°15′15″W	1161771	Upload Photo
The Manor House & Three Willows	Buckden, Huntingdonshire	Houses	Early 17th century	24 October 1951	TL1928867590; 52°17′37″N 0°15′08″W	1161627	Upload Photo
Parish Church of All Saints	Buckworth, Huntingdonshire	Parish Church	12th century	28 January 1958	TL1480976786; 52°22′38″N 0°18′53″W	1130189	Parish Church of All Saints More images
Parish Church of St Lawrence	Bythorn, Bythorn and Keyston, Huntingdonshire	Parish church	Late 13th century	28 January 1958	TL0570275911; 52°22′16″N 0°26′56″W	1130139	Parish Church of St Lawrence More images
All Saints' Church (previously St Margaret's Church)	Covington, Huntingdonshire	Church	12th century	14 May 1959	TL0544370773; 52°19′30″N 0°27′15″W	1214317	All Saints' Church (previously St Margaret's Church) More images
Former Parish Church of St Mary Magdalene	Caldecote, Denton and Caldecote, Huntingdonshire	Dwelling	Recent	13 December 1957	TL1408388420; 52°28′54″N 0°19′18″W	1215182	Former Parish Church of St Mary Magdalene More images
Church of St Lawrence	Diddington, Huntingdonshire	Church	13th century	14 May 1959	TL1904465956; 52°16′44″N 0°15′23″W	1130308	Church of St Lawrence More images
Woodlands	Earith, Huntingdonshire	House	18th century	30 May 1958	TL3851774776; 52°21′13″N 0°01′57″E	1128505	Upload Photo
91 High Street	Earith, Huntingdonshire	Farmhouse	Early 18th century	4 November 1982	TL3829974835; 52°21′15″N 0°01′45″E	1162718	Upload Photo
Parish Church of All Saints	Overend, Elton, Huntingdonshire	Parish Church	c. 1270	13 December 1957	TL0887193562; 52°31′45″N 0°23′48″W	1317486	Parish Church of All Saints More images
Service Range or Former Stable Range circa 20 Metres South East of Elton Hall on the South-western Side of the Open Courtyard	Elton, Huntingdonshire	Stable	Early 18th century	16 November 1988	TL0887592948; 52°31′25″N 0°23′48″W	1164913	Upload Photo
Stables Circa 30 Metres East of Elton Hall	Elton, Huntingdonshire	House	c. 1870	16 November 1988	TL0893392975; 52°31′26″N 0°23′45″W	1130095	Upload Photo
Church of St Mary	Farcet, Huntingdonshire	Parish Church	12th century	13 December 1957	TL2016994639; 52°32′11″N 0°13′47″W	1215281	Church of St Mary More images
Grove House	Fenstanton, Huntingdonshire	House	Early 18th century	24 October 1951	TL3139068498; 52°17′56″N 0°04′29″W	1128485	Grove House
Kirkby Cottage, Windwhistle & Ye Old Croft	Fenstanton, Huntingdonshire	Farmhouse	Early 17th century	30 May 1958	TL3186068724; 52°18′03″N 0°04′04″W	1162784	Upload Photo
Manor House, Cambridge Rd	Fenstanton, Huntingdonshire	Farmhouse	Early-mid 18th century	24 October 1951	TL3107468760; 52°18′05″N 0°04′45″W	1128510	Manor House, Cambridge Rd More images
The Manor House, Chequer St	Fenstanton, Huntingdonshire	Manor House	17th century	30 May 1958	TL3177568759; 52°18′04″N 0°04′08″W	1128512	The Manor House, Chequer St
Parish Church of St Helen	Folksworth and Washingley, Huntingdonshire	Parish Church	c. 1150	13 December 1957	TL1464490356; 52°29′57″N 0°18′45″W	1317442	Parish Church of St Helen More images
Farm Hall	Godmanchester, Huntingdonshire	Farmhouse	1746	28 November 1950	TL2421970186; 52°18′57″N 0°10′45″W	1128580	Farm Hall More images
Island Hall	Godmanchester, Huntingdonshire	House	Mid 18th century	28 November 1950	TL2439270793; 52°19′16″N 0°10′35″W	1330716	Island Hall More images
Meadow Wall facing Number 24	Godmanchester, Huntingdonshire	Gate Pier	18th century	27 May 1977	TL2420770208; 52°18′57″N 0°10′45″W	1330709	Upload Photo
The Chinese Bridge	Godmanchester, Huntingdonshire	Ornamental Bridge	1827	29 May 1969	TL2443670584; 52°19′09″N 0°10′33″W	1128661	The Chinese Bridge More images
Tudor House, 2 Earning St	Godmanchester, Huntingdonshire	Timber Framed House	c1600-1603	28 November 1950	TL2487870468; 52°19′05″N 0°10′10″W	1330671	Tudor House, 2 Earning St More images
Two Piers and Railings at No 24 along Street front	Godmanchester, Huntingdonshire	Gate Pier	Mid 18th century	27 May 1977	TL2420970191; 52°18′57″N 0°10′45″W	1162402	Upload Photo
Parish Church of St Michael	Great Gidding, Huntingdonshire	Parish Church	Mid 13th century	28 January 1958	TL1165583130; 52°26′05″N 0°21′33″W	1130104	Parish Church of St Michael More images
Barn to East of Old Barn Farmhouse	Great Gransden, Huntingdonshire	Barn	Early 17th century	24 October 1951	TL2681155778; 52°11′08″N 0°08′47″W	1211238	Upload Photo
Marley's Cottage	Great Gransden, Huntingdonshire	House	17th century	18 November 1983	TL2707955840; 52°11′10″N 0°08′33″W	1211199	Upload Photo
Post Mill	Great Gransden, Huntingdonshire	Post Mill	c. 1612	18 November 1983	TL2771755522; 52°10′59″N 0°08′00″W	1211279	Post Mill More images
Rippington Manor	Great Gransden, Huntingdonshire	Farmhouse	16th century	24 October 1951	TL2715455605; 52°11′03″N 0°08′30″W	1290193	Upload Photo
Place House	Great Staughton, Huntingdonshire	Country House	1539–57	24 October 1951	TL1231764680; 52°16′08″N 0°21′20″W	1288544	Upload Photo
Parish Church of St Mary	Haddon, Huntingdonshire	Parish Church	11th century	13 December 1957	TL1343692489; 52°31′07″N 0°19′47″W	1274855	Parish Church of St Mary More images
Parish Church of St Nicholas	Hail Weston, Huntingdonshire	Parish Church	13th century	14 May 1959	TL1652062079; 52°14′40″N 0°17′41″W	1330437	Parish Church of St Nicholas More images
Parish Church of St Andrew	Steeple Gidding, Hamerton and Steeple Gidding, Huntingdonshire	Parish Church	12th century	28 January 1958	TL1320581355; 52°25′07″N 0°20′13″W	1130118	Parish Church of St Andrew More images
Parish of All Saints	Hamerton, Hamerton and Steeple Gidding, Huntingdonshire	Parish Church	13th century	28 January 1958	TL1371379656; 52°24′11″N 0°19′48″W	1222799	Parish of All Saints More images
Hemingford Park Hall	Hemingford Abbots, Huntingdonshire	Country House	1842-3	24 October 1951	TL2761570942; 52°19′18″N 0°07′45″W	1330770	Upload Photo
The Old Rectory	Hemingford Abbots, Huntingdonshire	House	Now	4 November 1982	TL2822871169; 52°19′25″N 0°07′12″W	1309410	Upload Photo
Broom Lodge	Hemingford Grey, Huntingdonshire	House	Early 18th century	30 May 1958	TL2923070648; 52°19′07″N 0°06′20″W	1128477	Upload Photo
Hemingford Grey House	Hemingford Grey, Huntingdonshire	House	1697	24 October 1951	TL2929270950; 52°19′17″N 0°06′16″W	1163066	Hemingford Grey House More images
River House	Hemingford Grey, Huntingdonshire	House	Mid 18th century	24 October 1951	TL2913670722; 52°19′10″N 0°06′25″W	1163089	River House More images
The Anchor	Hemingford Grey, Huntingdonshire	Open Hall House	Mid-late 16th century	4 November 1982	TL2930970782; 52°19′12″N 0°06′15″W	1163059	The Anchor More images
Hilton Hall, Gate Piers Forecourt Wall	Hilton, Huntingdonshire	House	Early 17th century	24 October 1951	TL2908866366; 52°16′49″N 0°06′33″W	1163219	Upload Photo
St Johns College Farmhouse	Hilton, Huntingdonshire	Farmhouse	15th century	24 October 1951	TL2864466504; 52°16′54″N 0°06′56″W	1330759	Upload Photo
Parish Church of St Giles	Holme, Huntingdonshire	Parish Church	12th century	13 December 1957	TL1893287968; 52°28′36″N 0°15′01″W	1215533	Parish Church of St Giles More images
Anchor Cottage	Holywell, Holywell-cum-Needingworth, Huntingdonshire	House	17th century	16 August 1971	TL3411470602; 52°19′02″N 0°02′02″W	1163321	Upload Photo
The Chestnuts	Needingworth, Holywell-cum-Needingworth, Huntingdonshire	Farmhouse	1710	24 October 1951	TL3450072314; 52°19′57″N 0°01′39″W	1330788	Upload Photo
Houghton Mill	Houghton, Houghton and Wyton, Huntingdonshire	Watermill	rebuilt from 18th century	24 October 1951	TL2815871971; 52°19′51″N 0°07′14″W	1128403	Houghton Mill More images
Manor Farmhouse	Houghton, Houghton and Wyton, Huntingdonshire	Farmhouse	Late 16th century	30 May 1958	TL2827272335; 52°20′03″N 0°07′08″W	1128408	Upload Photo
1 The Green	Houghton, Houghton and Wyton, Huntingdonshire	House	1983	4 November 1982	TL2817472231; 52°20′00″N 0°07′13″W	1163390	Upload Photo
Castle Hill House	Huntingdon, Huntingdonshire	House	1787	23 July 1969	TL2406371584; 52°19′42″N 0°10′51″W	1128637	Castle Hill House More images
Church of All Saints	Hartford, Huntingdon, Huntingdonshire	Church	Early 12th century	10 January 1951	TL2558572550; 52°20′12″N 0°09′30″W	1330670	Church of All Saints More images
Cowper House	Huntingdon, Huntingdonshire	House	Early 18th century or earlier	10 January 1951	TL2399371651; 52°19′44″N 0°10′55″W	1128638	Upload Photo
Cromwell Museum	Huntingdon, Huntingdonshire	Grammar School	1854–1856	10 January 1951	TL2380671856; 52°19′51″N 0°11′04″W	1161870	Cromwell Museum More images
Park Wall of Hinchingbrooke House Fronting Brampton Road	Huntingdon, Huntingdonshire	Park Wall	17th century	27 May 1977	TL2270871372; 52°19′36″N 0°12′03″W	1128652	Upload Photo
The George Hotel	Huntingdon, Huntingdonshire	Hotel	Late 17th century	10 January 1951	TL2374971871; 52°19′52″N 0°11′07″W	1161746	The George Hotel More images
The Manor House	Hartford, Huntingdon, Huntingdonshire	Jettied House	Late 15th century or early 16th century	10 January 1951	TL2574972799; 52°20′20″N 0°09′21″W	1128627	Upload Photo
Town Hall	Huntingdon, Huntingdonshire	Town Hall	1745	10 January 1951	TL2382471797; 52°19′49″N 0°11′04″W	1128584	Town Hall More images
Walden House	Huntingdon, Huntingdonshire	House	Late 17th century	10 January 1951	TL2377071820; 52°19′50″N 0°11′06″W	1128590	Walden House More images
28 High Street	Huntingdon, Huntingdonshire	House	Early 18th century	10 January 1950	TL2402471651; 52°19′44″N 0°10′53″W	1161677	Upload Photo
Court House	Kimbolton, Huntingdonshire	House	Late 17th century or early 18th century	24 October 1951	TL0990367792; 52°17′50″N 0°23′23″W	1290388	Upload Photo
La Cote d'Or Restaurant	Kimbolton, Huntingdonshire	House	16th century	24 October 1951	TL0993067761; 52°17′49″N 0°23′22″W	1210579	Upload Photo
Main and Side Gates and Four Gate Piers to South East of Kimbolton School	Kimbolton, Huntingdonshire	Gate	Early 18th century	24 October 1951	TL1042767519; 52°17′41″N 0°22′56″W	1210891	Main and Side Gates and Four Gate Piers to South East of Kimbolton School
Two Flights of Stone Steps, to East Front of Kimbolton School	Kimbolton, Huntingdonshire	Steps	Early 18th century	28 April 1983	TL1010967575; 52°17′43″N 0°23′13″W	1221025	Upload Photo
Warren House	Kimbolton, Huntingdonshire	House	1979	15 November 1979	TL1067668354; 52°18′08″N 0°22′42″W	1211750	Upload Photo
White House	Kimbolton, Huntingdonshire	House	Late 18th century or early 19th century	24 October 1951	TL0988967807; 52°17′51″N 0°23′24″W	1210624	Upload Photo
5 East Street	Kimbolton, Huntingdonshire	House	Early 18th century	24 October 1951	TL1005267752; 52°17′49″N 0°23′16″W	1290574	Upload Photo
Church of St Peter	Kings Ripton, Huntingdonshire	Parish Church	13th century	28 January 1958	TL2611776582; 52°22′22″N 0°08′56″W	1309498	Church of St Peter More images
The Castle	Leighton, Huntingdonshire	House	Mid 17th century	21 July 1951	TL1166875210; 52°21′49″N 0°21′41″W	1330513	The Castle More images
Little Paxton Hall	Little Paxton, Huntingdonshire	House	Mid 17th century	24 October 1951	TL1872762898; 52°15′05″N 0°15′44″W	1162401	Upload Photo
Parish Church of St James	Little Paxton, Huntingdonshire	Parish Church	Late 12th century	14 May 1959	TL1890262760; 52°15′01″N 0°15′35″W	1130279	Parish Church of St James More images
Church of All Saints	Offord Cluny, Offord Cluny and Offord D'Arcy, Huntingdonshire	Church	13th century	14 May 1959	TL2185567042; 52°17′17″N 0°12′54″W	1130281	Church of All Saints More images
Manor House	Offord Cluny and Offord D'Arcy, Huntingdonshire	Farmhouse	1613	3 June 1983	TL2164066366; 52°16′55″N 0°13′06″W	1130248	Upload Photo
Church of St Peter	Old Hurst, Huntingdonshire	Parish Church	13th century	30 May 1958	TL3001277303; 52°22′42″N 0°05′29″W	1163560	Church of St Peter More images
Parish Church of St Swithin	Old Weston, Huntingdonshire	Church	c. 1200	28 January 1958	TL0939577206; 52°22′55″N 0°23′39″W	1130116	Parish Church of St Swithin More images
Gaynes Hall	West Perry, Perry, Huntingdonshire	House	Late 17th century	28 April 1983	TL1466366223; 52°16′56″N 0°19′14″W	1288478	Gaynes Hall
Fenton Manor Farmhouse	Fenton, Pidley cum Fenton, Huntingdonshire	Farmhouse	Early 18th century	24 October 1951	TL3209879645; 52°23′56″N 0°03′36″W	1330787	Upload Photo
Stanley Farmhouse	Pidley, Pidley cum Fenton, Huntingdonshire	Farmhouse	c. 1700	24 October 1951	TL3324477701; 52°22′52″N 0°02′38″W	1128416	Upload Photo
Fountain, approx. 50 Metres South of Ramsey Abbey	Ramsey, Huntingdonshire	Fountain		8 June 1983	TL2920384985; 52°26′51″N 0°06′01″W	1330429	Fountain, approx. 50 Metres South of Ramsey Abbey
Precinct Wall running along the Eastern and Southern Side of Church Green and along the Eastern and Southern Side of Abbey Green	Ramsey, Huntingdonshire	Wall	Medieval	8 June 1983	TL2914485125; 52°26′56″N 0°06′04″W	1130265	Upload Photo
The Gables	Ramsey, Huntingdonshire	Hall House	Medieval	8 June 1983	TL2860384994; 52°26′52″N 0°06′33″W	1330454	Upload Photo
Manor House	St Ives, Huntingdonshire	House	Late 16th century	29 September 1951	TL3127671189; 52°19′23″N 0°04′31″W	1128709	Manor House More images
New Bridges	Saint Ives, Huntingdonshire	Bridge	1822	4 November 1982	TL3116970977; 52°19′16″N 0°04′37″W	1163147	New Bridges More images
Manor House Farmhouse	Sawtry, Huntingdonshire	Farmhouse	Late 17th century	21 July 1951	TL1713182673; 52°25′46″N 0°16′43″W	1162796	Manor House Farmhouse More images
Great North Road Bridge carrying North Bound Carriageway over the River Nene	Sibson-cum-Stibbington, Huntingdonshire	Road Bridge	1925-8	14 October 1991	TL0763099360; 52°34′53″N 0°24′47″W	1274340	Upload Photo
Parish Church of St John the Baptist	Stibbington, Sibson-cum-Stibbington, Huntingdonshire	Parish Church	Early to mid 12th century	13 December 1957	TL0902398666; 52°34′30″N 0°23′34″W	1274862	Parish Church of St John the Baptist More images
The Haycock Hotel	Wansford, Sibson-cum-Stibbington, Huntingdonshire	Hotel	18th century	25 September 1951	TL0756499057; 52°34′43″N 0°24′51″W	1237866	The Haycock Hotel More images
The Old Rectory	Stibbington, Sibson-cum-Stibbington, Huntingdonshire	Dairy	Early to mid 17th century	25 September 1951	TL0904198632; 52°34′29″N 0°23′33″W	1222331	Upload Photo
The George	Spaldwick, Huntingdonshire	Inn	16th century and 17th century	21 July 1951	TL1292272806; 52°20′30″N 0°20′38″W	1130204	The George More images
The Limes	Spaldwick, Huntingdonshire	Farmhouse	Late 17th century	21 July 1951	TL1308072766; 52°20′29″N 0°20′30″W	1130203	Upload Photo
Brook House	St Neots, Huntingdonshire	House	Early 18th century	10 January 1951	TL1837560172; 52°13′37″N 0°16′06″W	1309921	Upload Photo
Crosshall	Eaton Socon, St. Neots, Huntingdonshire	Farmhouse	17th century	7 May 1952	TL1741661201; 52°14′11″N 0°16′55″W	1331024	Upload Photo
Ford House	Eaton Socon, St. Neots, Huntingdonshire	Box Frame House	Mid-late 15th century	13 July 1964	TL1765659978; 52°13′32″N 0°16′44″W	1128743	Upload Photo
Parish Church of St Mary	Eynesbury, St. Neots, Huntingdonshire	Bell Tower	1688	10 January 1951	TL1838859836; 52°13′26″N 0°16′06″W	1127993	Parish Church of St Mary More images
Parish Church of St Mary	Eaton Socon, St. Neots, Huntingdonshire	Parish Church	C14-15	13 July 1964	TL1704058869; 52°12′56″N 0°17′18″W	1127971	Parish Church of St Mary More images
Tudor House	Eynesbury, St. Neots, Huntingdonshire	House	Late 17th century	10 January 1951	TL1830059926; 52°13′29″N 0°16′10″W	1128739	Upload Photo
Parish Church of St Mary	Stilton, Huntingdonshire	Parish Church	Earlier	13 December 1957	TL1595989264; 52°29′20″N 0°17′37″W	1215661	Parish Church of St Mary More images
The Bell Inn	Stilton, Huntingdonshire	House	19th century	25 September 1951	TL1630389289; 52°29′21″N 0°17′19″W	1216001	The Bell Inn More images
Church of St Botolph	Stow Longa, Huntingdonshire	Village Cross	Late 12th century	14 May 1959	TL1070171151; 52°19′38″N 0°22′37″W	1214736	Church of St Botolph More images
Church of St Bartholomew	Great Stukeley, The Stukeleys, Huntingdonshire	Parish Church	12th century	28 January 1958	TL2169774567; 52°21′20″N 0°12′52″W	1165400	Church of St Bartholomew More images
Church of St Martin	Little Stukeley, The Stukeleys, Huntingdonshire	Parish Church	12th century	28 January 1958	TL2094875684; 52°21′57″N 0°13′30″W	1130165	Church of St Martin More images
Hardened Aircraft Shelters	The Stukeleys, Huntingdonshire	Hardened Aircraft Shelter	Built c1983	10 September 2007	TL2188077147; 52°22′44″N 0°12′39″W	1392250	Upload Photo
The Avionics Building	The Stukeleys, Huntingdonshire	Engineering Workshop	Extant 1989–1995	10 September 2007	TL2156676882; 52°22′35″N 0°12′56″W	1392251	Upload Photo
Manor House	Tilbrook, Huntingdonshire	Timber Framed House	17th century	28 April 1983	TL0815269516; 52°18′47″N 0°24′54″W	1288422	Upload Photo
Parish Church of St Michael	Toseland, Huntingdonshire	Parish Church	18th century	14 May 1959	TL2402162596; 52°14′51″N 0°11′05″W	1290027	Parish Church of St Michael More images
Toseland Hall	Toseland, Huntingdonshire	Manor House	Early 17th century	24 October 1951	TL2351262575; 52°14′51″N 0°11′32″W	1211590	Toseland Hall More images
Church of St Margaret	Upton, Upton and Coppingford, Huntingdonshire	Parish Church	Late 11th century	28 January 1958	TL1744878506; 52°23′31″N 0°16′32″W	1130171	Church of St Margaret More images
Former St James Church	Little Raveley, Upwood and the Raveleys, Huntingdonshire	House	c. 1980	3 February 1987	TL2559079947; 52°24′11″N 0°09′19″W	1130121	Former St James Church More images
The Old Barn	Upwood, Upwood and the Raveleys, Huntingdonshire	House	16th century	2 March 1987	TL2584082793; 52°25′43″N 0°09′02″W	1162855	Upload Photo
28 Church Road	Warboys, Huntingdonshire	Kitchen	17th century	24 October 1951	TL3023079891; 52°24′06″N 0°05′14″W	1128357	Upload Photo
Church of St James the Great	Waresley-cum-Tetworth, Huntingdonshire	Parish Church	1855-7	14 May 1959	TL2495954548; 52°10′30″N 0°10′27″W	1289920	Church of St James the Great More images
Tetworth Hall at End of Lane from Dove Road to Tetworth Hall	Waresley-cum-Tetworth, Huntingdonshire	Country House	1710	24 October 1951	TL2176353054; 52°09′44″N 0°13′17″W	1290026	Tetworth Hall at End of Lane from Dove Road to Tetworth Hall More images
Parish Church of St Remigius	Water Newton, Huntingdonshire	Parish Church	12th century	13 December 1957	TL1088397322; 52°33′45″N 0°21′56″W	1237953	Parish Church of St Remigius More images
Parish Church of All Saints	Winwick, Huntingdonshire	Parish Church	12th century	28 January 1958	TL1047480700; 52°24′47″N 0°22′38″W	1223069	Parish Church of All Saints More images
Church of St Andrew	Wood Walton, Huntingdonshire	Parish Church	13th century	28 January 1958	TL2088882168; 52°25′27″N 0°13′25″W	1130123	Church of St Andrew More images
Church of St John the Baptist	Woodhurst, Huntingdonshire	Parish Church	Late 12th century	30 May 1958	TL3157576107; 52°22′02″N 0°04′08″W	1163919	Church of St John the Baptist More images
Holdick Farmhouse	Woodhurst, Huntingdonshire	Farmhouse	Early 18th century	30 May 1958	TL3182675916; 52°21′56″N 0°03′55″W	1128376	Upload Photo
Parish Church of the Holy Cross	Yelling, Huntingdonshire	Parish church	1180–90	14 May 1959	TL2622162468; 52°14′45″N 0°09′10″W	1211788	Parish Church of the Holy Cross More images
