= Hamerton Zoo Park =

Hamerton Zoo
- Interactive map of Hamerton Zoo
- 52.409°N 0.328°W
- Date opened: 15 June 1990
- Location: Hamerton, Huntingdonshire, England
- Land area: 25 acres
- Memberships: EAZA
- Major exhibits: Cats, Primates and Birds
- Website: www.hamertonzoopark.com

Hamerton Zoo Park is situated in Hamerton, near Sawtry, Huntingdonshire, England.

== Development ==
Planning permission for change of use from agricultural land to a zoo was granted in 1988, with the park being opened on 15 June 1990 by local MP, then-Chancellor, and future Prime Minister John Major. The zoo has two large wind turbines to provide power for the park erected during the second half of November 2012; the zoo was described as being the "most environmentally-friendly zoo in Europe" in 2014. An application for two 50 kW turbines was turned down in August 2015 by Huntingdonshire District Council.

== Conservation ==
The zoo has a conservation sanctuary which has a collection of nearly 100 different species including rare / endangered animals and birds.

== Tiger incident ==
The park was evacuated on the morning of 29 May 2017 after what was described as a 'serious incident'. It was later confirmed that zookeeper Rosa King, age 33, had been killed in the tiger enclosure at about 11:15 a.m. that day.
