= Huntingdon Town Hall =

Municipal building in Huntingdon, Cambridgeshire, England

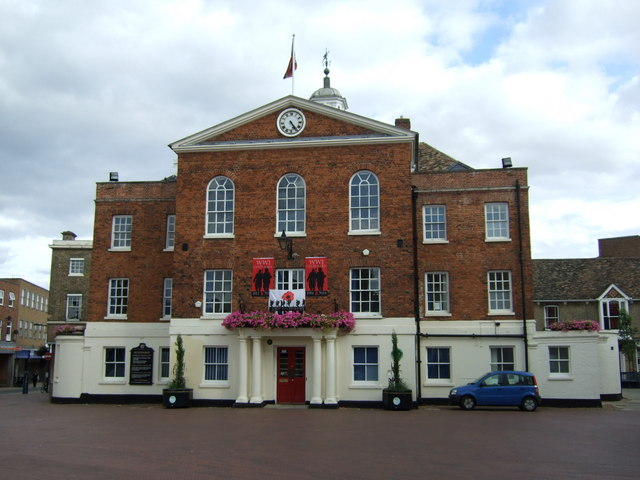
- Huntingdon Town Hall

- Shown in Cambridgeshire
- 52.3303°N 0.1843°W
- Location: Market Hill, Huntingdon

History
- Built: 1745

Site notes
- Architect: Benjamin Timbrell
- Architectural style: Neoclassical style

Listed Building – Grade II*
- Official name: Town Hall
- Designated: 10 January 1951
- Reference no.: 1128584

Huntingdon Town Hall is a municipal structure on Market Hill in Huntingdon, Cambridgeshire, England. The town hall, which was the headquarters of Huntingdon Borough Council, is a Grade II* listed building.

== History ==
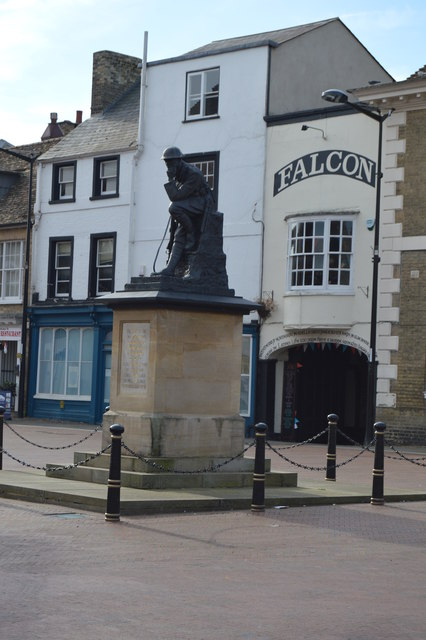
Huntingdon War Memorial

The first municipal building on Market Hill was a 17th-century courthouse which was arcaded on the ground floor, so that markets could be held, with an assembly room on the first floor. It was demolished in the mid-18th century to allow construction of the current building.

The current building was designed by Benjamin Timbrell in the neoclassical style, built in red brick with stone dressings and was completed in 1745. Initially the building was of two storeys over an open ground floor, but in 1817-18 it was reconfigured by S. P. Cockerell: the ground floor was enclosed to form an entrance hall, and two new law courts to the rear.

As rebuilt, the design involved a symmetrical main frontage with seven bays facing onto Market Hill with the ground floor rendered and painted; the central section of three bays, which projected forward, featured a doorway flanked by two pairs of Tuscan order columns supporting an entablature; there was a balcony and a French door flanked by casement windows on the first floor and there were three tall round headed windows on the second floor. At roof level there was a large pediment with a clock in the tympanum and central cupola above that. Internally, the principal rooms were on the top floor: the assembly hall (or 'ballroom'), which featured three chandeliers and a series of important portraits, the Mayor's Parlour and the council chamber, which featured boards listing the names of former mayors of the town. The main staircase was recovered from the earlier courthouse.

After the First World War, a war memorial in the form of a bronze statue of a soldier was designed by the sculptor, Kathleen Scott and erected in front of the town hall by the local contractor, Thackray and Co; the statue, which became known as "the Thinking Soldier", was unveiled by the Lord Lieutenant of Huntingdonshire, the Earl of Sandwich, on 11 November 1923. The building continued to serve as the headquarters of Huntingdon Borough Council and, from 1961, of Huntingdon and Godmanchester Borough Council and briefly remained the local seat of government when the enlarged Huntingdonshire District Council was formed in 1974. Although the district council relocated to modern facilities at Pathfinder House in St Mary's Street in Huntingdon in 1977, the town hall continued to be used as a meeting place by Huntingdon Town Council and, following a major programme of refurbishment works costing £0.9 million which was completed in 2012, the building became an approved location for marriages and civil partnership ceremonies.

Works of art in the town hall include a portrait by John Shackleton of King George II and by Gainsborough Dupont of Queen Caroline, as well as portraits by Allan Ramsay of King George III and of Queen Charlotte. There are also portraits by Peter Lely of Oliver Cromwell, by Sir Joshua Reynolds of the Duke of Cumberland and by Godfrey Kneller of the former local member of parliament, Sir Lionel Walden, as well as portraits by Francis Grant of the Lord Chief Baron of the Exchequer, Sir Frederick Pollock and of the former Secretary of State for War, Jonathan Peel.

== See also ==
- Grade II* listed buildings in Huntingdonshire
