= Hamerton =

Village in Cambridgeshire, England

Coordinates: 52.4°N 0.317°W

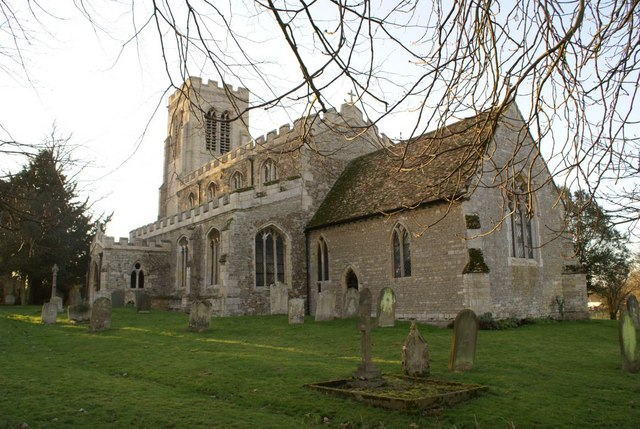
- All Saints' Church, Hamerton

- Location within Cambridgeshire
- Population: 87 (2001 census)
- OS grid reference: TL145794
- Civil parish: Hamerton and Steeple Gidding
- District: Huntingdonshire
- Shire county: Cambridgeshire
- Region: East
- Country: England
- Sovereign state: United Kingdom
- Post town: Huntingdon
- Postcode district: PE28
- Police: Cambridgeshire
- Fire: Cambridgeshire
- Ambulance: East of England
- UK Parliament: North West Cambridgeshire

Hamerton is a village in the civil parish of Hamerton and Steeple Gidding, in Cambridgeshire, England. Hamerton lies approximately 8 miles (13 km) north-west of Huntingdon. Hamerton is situated within Huntingdonshire which is a non-metropolitan district of Cambridgeshire as well as being a historic county of England. Hamerton Zoo is on the north side of the village. The village has a church dedicated to All Saints. In 2001 the parish had a population of 87.

The civil parish of Hamerton and Steeple Gidding incorporates the nearby hamlet of Steeple Gidding, which has a 14th-century church St Andrew's that is now redundant and preserved by the Churches Conservation Trust. Along with its nearby neighbour Great Gidding, Steeple Gidding forms part of a cluster of villages known as the Giddings.

== History ==
Hamerton was listed in the Domesday Book in the Hundred of Leightonstone in Huntingdonshire; the name of the settlement was written as Hambertune in the Domesday Book. In 1086 there was just one manor in Hamerton; the annual rent paid to the lord of the manor in 1066 had been £12 and the rent was the same in 1086. The Domesday Book does not explicitly detail the population of a place but it records that there were 26 households at Hamerton. There is no consensus about the average size of a household at that time; estimates range from 3. 5 to 5. 0 people per household.

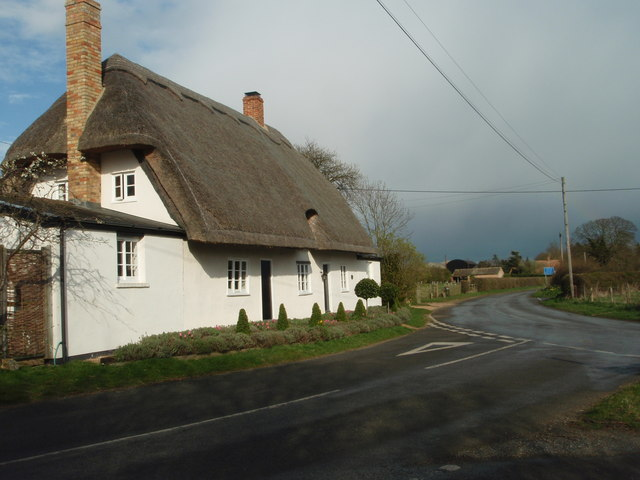
Thatched cottage at Hamerton

Steeple Gidding was listed in the Domesday Book in the Hundred of Leightonstone in Huntingdonshire; the name of the settlement was written as Redinges in the Domesday Book. In 1086 there was just one manor at Steeple Gidding; the annual rent paid to the lord of the manor in 1066 had been £5 and the rent was the same in 1086. The Domesday Book does not explicitly detail the population of a place but it records that there was 18 households and eight ploughlands at Steeple Gidding in 1086. In addition to the arable land, there was 20 acres (8 hectares) of meadows and 40 acres (16 hectares) of woodland at Steeple Gidding.

== Government ==
Hamerton is part of the civil parish of Hamerton and Steeple Gidding; it does not have a parish council but just holds an annual parish meeting. On 1 April 2010 the parish of Hamerton was abolished to form "Hamerton and Steeple Gidding".

Hamerton was in the historic and administrative county of Huntingdonshire until 1965. From 1965, the village was part of the new administrative county of Huntingdon and Peterborough. Then in 1974, following the Local Government Act 1972, Hamerton became a part of the county of Cambridgeshire.

The second tier of local government is Huntingdonshire District Council which is a non-metropolitan district of Cambridgeshire and has its headquarters in Huntingdon. Huntingdonshire District Council has 52 councillors representing 29 district wards. Huntingdonshire District Council collects the council tax, and provides services such as building regulations, local planning, environmental health, leisure and tourism. Hamerton is a part of the district ward of Sawtry and is represented on the district council by two councillors. District councillors serve for four-year terms following elections to Huntingdonshire District Council.

For Hamerton the highest tier of local government is Cambridgeshire County Council which has administration buildings in Cambridge. The county council provides county-wide services such as major road infrastructure, fire and rescue, education, social services, libraries and heritage services. Cambridgeshire County Council consists of 69 councillors representing 60 electoral divisions. Hamerton is part of the electoral division of Sawtry and Ellington and is represented on the county council by one councillor.

At Westminster Hamerton is in the parliamentary constituency of North West Cambridgeshire, and elects one Member of Parliament (MP) by the first past the post system of election. Hamerton is represented in the House of Commons by Shailesh Vara (Conservative). Shailesh Vara has represented the constituency since 2005. The previous member of parliament was Brian Mawhinney (Conservative) who represented the constituency between 1997 and 2005.

== Demography ==
=== Population ===
In the period 1801 to 1901 the population of Hamerton was recorded every ten years by the UK census. During this time the population was in the range of 129 (the lowest was in 1801) and 187 (the highest was in 1871).

From 1901, a census was taken every ten years with the exception of 1941 (due to the Second World War).

Parish	1911	1921	1931	1951	1961	1971	1981	1991	2001	2011
Hamerton	159	140	121	141	130	93	100	101	87	
Steeple Gidding	81	62	59	57	56	43	39	27	33	
Hamerton and Steeple Gidding	240	202	180	198	186	136	139	128	120	112

All population census figures from report Historic Census figures Cambridgeshire to 2011 by Cambridgeshire Insight.

In 2011, the parish covered an area of 3,284 acres (1,329 hectares) and the population density for Hamerton and Steeple Gidding in 2011 was 21.8 persons per square mile (8.4 per square kilometre).
