= Eynesbury Hardwicke =

Former civil parish in Cambridgeshire, England

Coordinates: 52.1938°N 0.2389°W

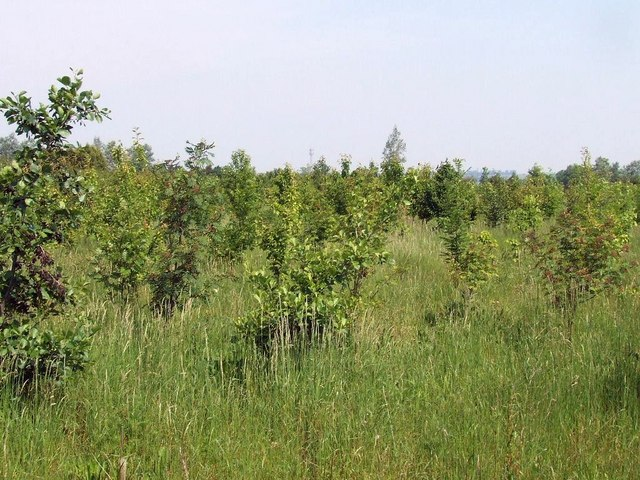

- Location within Cambridgeshire
- Population: 1,124 (2001 Census)
- OS grid reference: TL2056
- District: Huntingdonshire
- Shire county: Cambridgeshire
- Region: East
- Country: England
- Sovereign state: United Kingdom
- Post town: St Neots
- Postcode district: PE19
- Dialling code: 01480
- Police: Cambridgeshire
- Fire: Cambridgeshire
- Ambulance: East of England

Eynesbury Hardwicke was an English civil parish which existed between 1895 and 2010; it was initially in the county of Huntingdonshire, and after 1974 it was in Cambridgeshire. The parish was created from the part of the ancient parish of Eynesbury which lay outside the urban district of St Neots. The old village of Eynesbury was within the urban district, and so Eynesbury Hardwicke covered the more rural parts of the old parish, including Caldecote Manor, Eynesbury Hardwick House, and the site of the deserted medieval village of Weald. The parish was abolished in 2010, when its area was split between the parishes of St Neots and Abbotsley.

== History ==
Eynesbury was an ancient parish. In 1876 the western part of the parish, including the village of Eynesbury itself, was incorporated into the local government district of St Neots. Under the Local Government Act 1894, such districts were reconstituted as urban districts, and civil parishes were no longer allowed to straddle district boundaries. The civil parish of Eynesbury was therefore reduced to just cover the part of the old parish within the urban district, and the remaining rural part of the old Eynesbury parish outside the urban district became a new civil parish called Eynesbury Hardwicke with effect from 1 April 1895.

The Eynesbury Hardwicke parish had an area of 2,641 acres (11 km^{2}) and was primarily countryside. It included Caldecote Manor, Eynesbury Hardwicke House, and the site of a deserted medieval village called Weald. Eynesbury Hardwicke did not include any notable settlements, but did have a parish council.

By the early 2000s, the urban area of St Neots had started to extend into Eynesbury Hardwicke.

The civil parish was abolished on 1 April 2010 and its area was divided between the neighbouring parishes of Abbotsley and St Neots. At the 2001 census (the last before the abolition of the civil parish), Eynesbury Hardwicke had a population of 1,124.
