= Steeple Gidding =

Village in Cambridgeshire, England

Coordinates: 52.419082°N 0.33030866°W

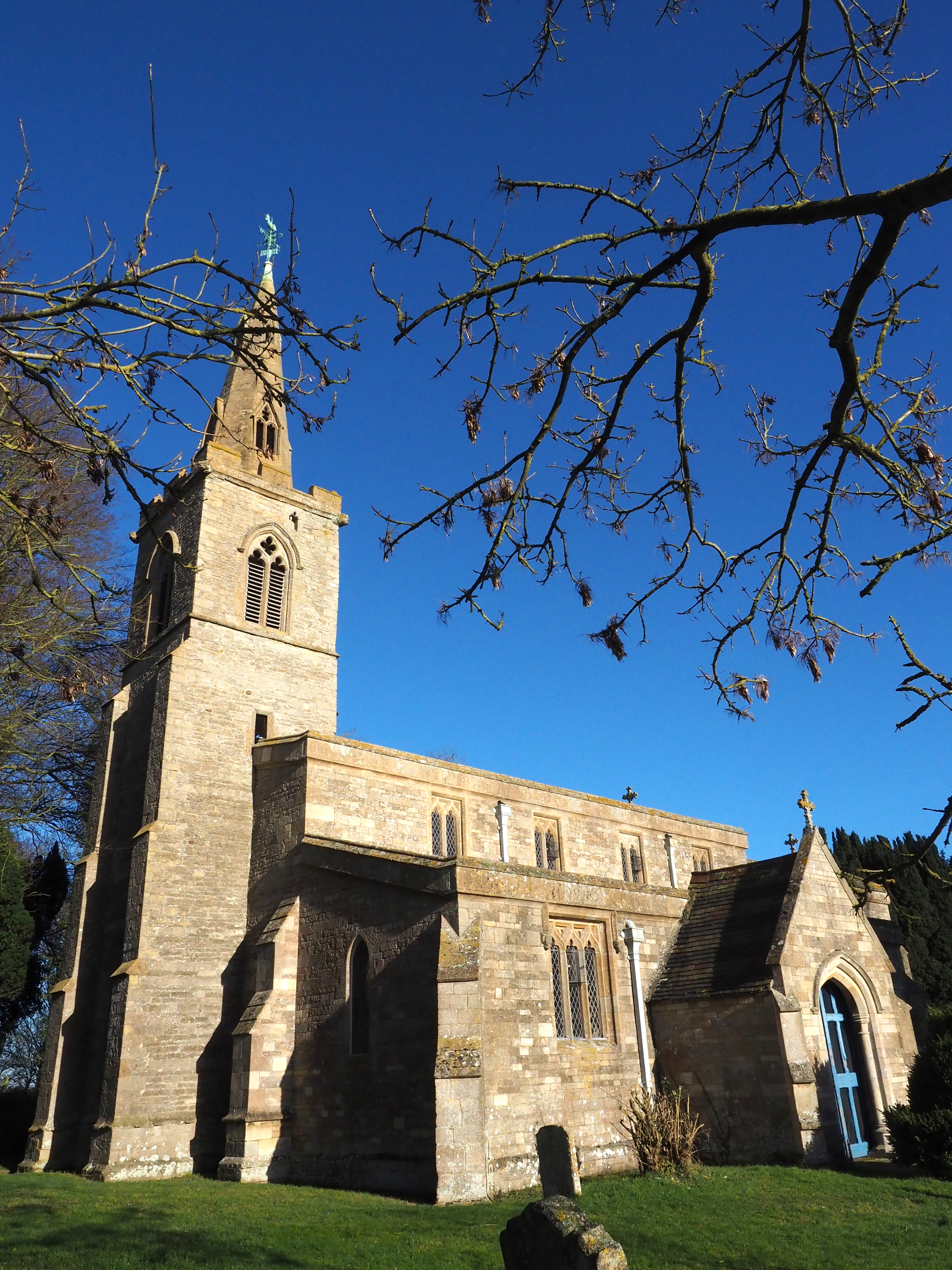

- Location within Cambridgeshire
- Population: 38 (2001 census)
- Civil parish: Hamerton and Steeple Gidding
- District: Huntingdonshire
- Shire county: Cambridgeshire
- Region: East
- Country: England
- Sovereign state: United Kingdom
- Police: Cambridgeshire
- Fire: Cambridgeshire
- Ambulance: East of England

Steeple Gidding is a village in the civil parish of Hamerton and Steeple Gidding, in the Huntingdonshire district, in the county of Cambridgeshire, England. It is 24 miles (39 km) from Cambridge. In 2001 the parish had a population of 38. Steeple Gidding has a church called St Andrew's Church. Steeple Gidding is one of the Giddings which also comprises the villages of Great Gidding and Little Gidding.

== History ==
The name "Steeple Gidding" means 'Gydda's/Gydela's people'. Steeple Gidding was recorded in the Domesday Book as Redinges. Steeple Gidding was "Redinges", in the 11th century, "Giddingges" and "Giddinge" in the 12th century and "Stepel Geddynge" in the 15th century.

Steeple Gidding was in Leightonstone hundred. In 1894 Steeple Gidding became part of Huntingdon Rural District. In 1965 it became part of Huntingdon and Peterborough, in 1974 it became part of Huntingdon non-metropolitan district in the non-metropolitan county of Cambridgeshire.
