= Nikephor Alphery =

Dispossessed clergy at the time of the English Civil War

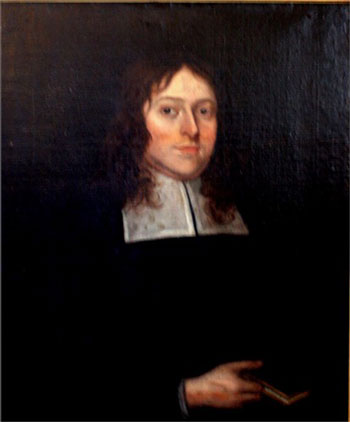

Nikephor Alphery (fl. 1618–1660) was one of the dispossessed clergy in the time of the English Civil War.

The only authority for the particulars of his ejection is John Walker's Sufferings of the Clergy, where the author is not sure of the Christian name, and calls him Mikefer, but says he was descended from a branch of the imperial line of Russia, and was sent to England by Mr. Joseph Bidell, a Russian merchant, to be educated at Oxford, when his and his two brothers' lives were in danger from a powerful faction in Russia. In an article in the 'S. D. U. K. Dictionary', Mr. Thomas Watts is unable to connect this story definitely with any records in Russian historians. He became rector of Woolley, in Huntingdonshire, in 1618, and was ejected in or about 1643. It appears that the 'fifths' were duly paid to him by his successor. At the Restoration in 1660 he was reinstated, but after some time retired to his son's house at Hammersmith, where he died. The particular hardships he endured are narrated by Walker, but, they are not worth recording, as they are given upon mere hearsay, derived from a letter from Peter Phelips, minister of Woolley, to Mr. Clavel. He was twice invited back to Russia, but preferred remaining in England to the chance of regaining a doubtful position in his native country.
