= Woolley, Cambridgeshire =

Hamlet in Cambridgeshire, England

Coordinates: 52.3564°N 0.3055°W

Woolley
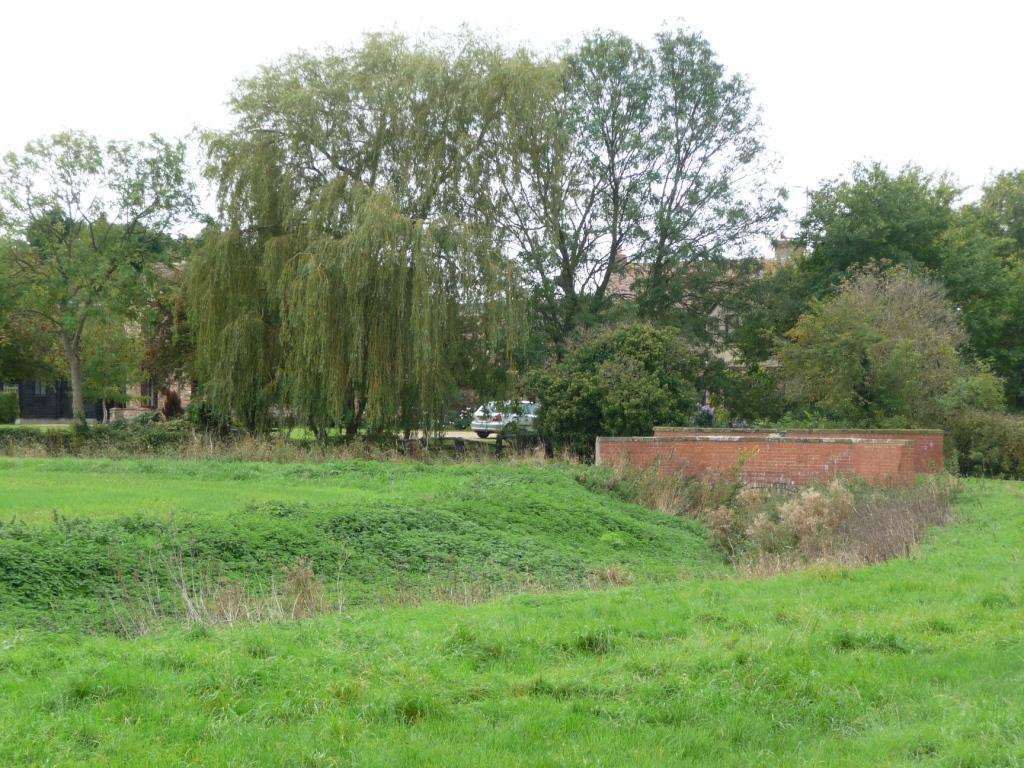
- Woolley Bridge

- Location within Cambridgeshire
- OS grid reference: TL1574
- Civil parish: Barham and Woolley
- District: Huntingdonshire
- Shire county: Cambridgeshire
- Region: East
- Country: England
- Sovereign state: United Kingdom
- Post town: Huntingdon
- Postcode district: PE28
- Dialling code: 01480
- Police: Cambridgeshire
- Fire: Cambridgeshire
- Ambulance: East of England
- UK Parliament: North West Cambridgeshire

Woolley is a hamlet and former civil parish, now in the parish of Barham and Woolley, in Cambridgeshire, England. Woolley lies approximately 5 miles (8 km) west of Huntingdon. The hamlet is in Huntingdonshire, which is a non-metropolitan district of Cambridgeshire as well as being a historic county of England. In 1931 the parish had a population of 29.

A 12th century church dedicated to St Mary was demolished in 1962 due to dwindling population and the deteriorating fabric of the building.

== History ==
In 1085 William the Conqueror ordered that a survey should be carried out across his kingdom to discover who owned which parts and what it was worth. The survey took place in 1086 and the results were recorded in what, since the 12th century, has become known as the Domesday Book. Starting with the king himself, for each landholder within a county there is a list of their estates or manors; and, for each manor, there is a summary of the resources of the manor, the amount of annual rent that was collected by the lord of the manor both in 1066 and in 1086, together with the taxable value.

Woolley was listed in the Domesday Book in the Hundred of Leightonstone in Huntingdonshire; the name of the settlement was written as Cileulai in the Domesday Book. In 1086 there were two manors at Woolley; the annual rent paid to the lords of the manors in 1066 had been £3 and the rent was the same in 1086.

The Domesday Book does not explicitly detail the population of a place but it records that there was 14 households at Woolley. There is no consensus about the average size of a household at that time;estimates range from 3.5 to 5.0 people per household. Using these figures then an estimate of the population of Woolley in 1086 is that it was within the range of 49 and 70 people.

The Domesday Book uses a number of units of measure for areas of land that are now unfamiliar terms, such as hides and ploughlands. In different parts of the country, these were terms for the area of land that a team of eight oxen could plough in a single season and are equivalent to 120 acres (49 hectares); this was the amount of land that was considered to be sufficient to support a single family. By 1086, the hide had become a unit of tax assessment rather than an actual land area; a hide was the amount of land that could be assessed as £1 for tax purposes. The survey records that there were six ploughlands at Woolley in 1086 and that there was the capacity for a further ploughland. In addition to the arable land, there was 20 acres (8 hectares) of meadows at Woolley.

The tax assessment in the Domesday Book was known as geld or danegeld and was a type of land-tax based on the hide or ploughland. It was originally a way of collecting a tribute to pay off the Danes when they attacked England, and was only levied when necessary. Following the Norman Conquest, the geld was used to raise money for the King and to pay for continental wars; by 1130, the geld was being collected annually. Having determined the value of a manor's land and other assets, a tax of so many shillings and pence per pound of value would be levied on the land holder. While this was typically two shillings in the pound the amount did vary; for example, in 1084 it was as high as six shillings in the pound. For the manors at Woolley the total tax assessed was 3.5 geld.

== Church ==
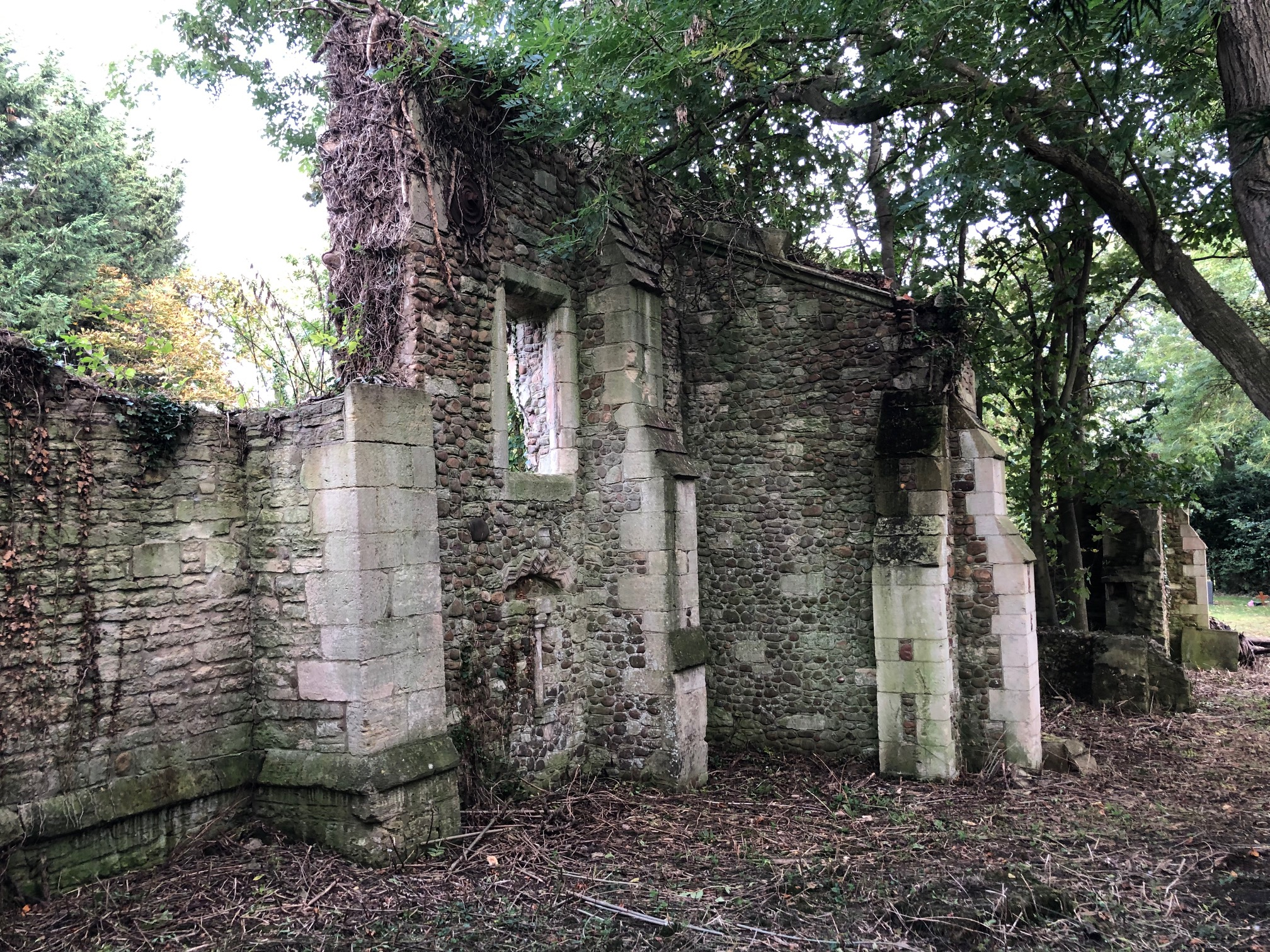
St Mary's church, Woolley, Cambs, from south (2021)

The church is not mentioned in the Domesday Survey of 1086, but the Romanesque stone chevrons built into the south nave wall suggest the existence of a building here in the 12th century. The chancel, nave, aisles and transepts were built c1300. The nave was lengthened and the tower and spire built in the late 14th century. The chancel was restored in 1857; the south transept and aisle were rebuilt in 1907, and the north aisle restored in 1914. The nave arcades were strengthened and the tower and spire restored in the 1930s.

Unfortunately the church was partly demolished in 1962. However, much of the south wall survives, as does elements of the west tower.

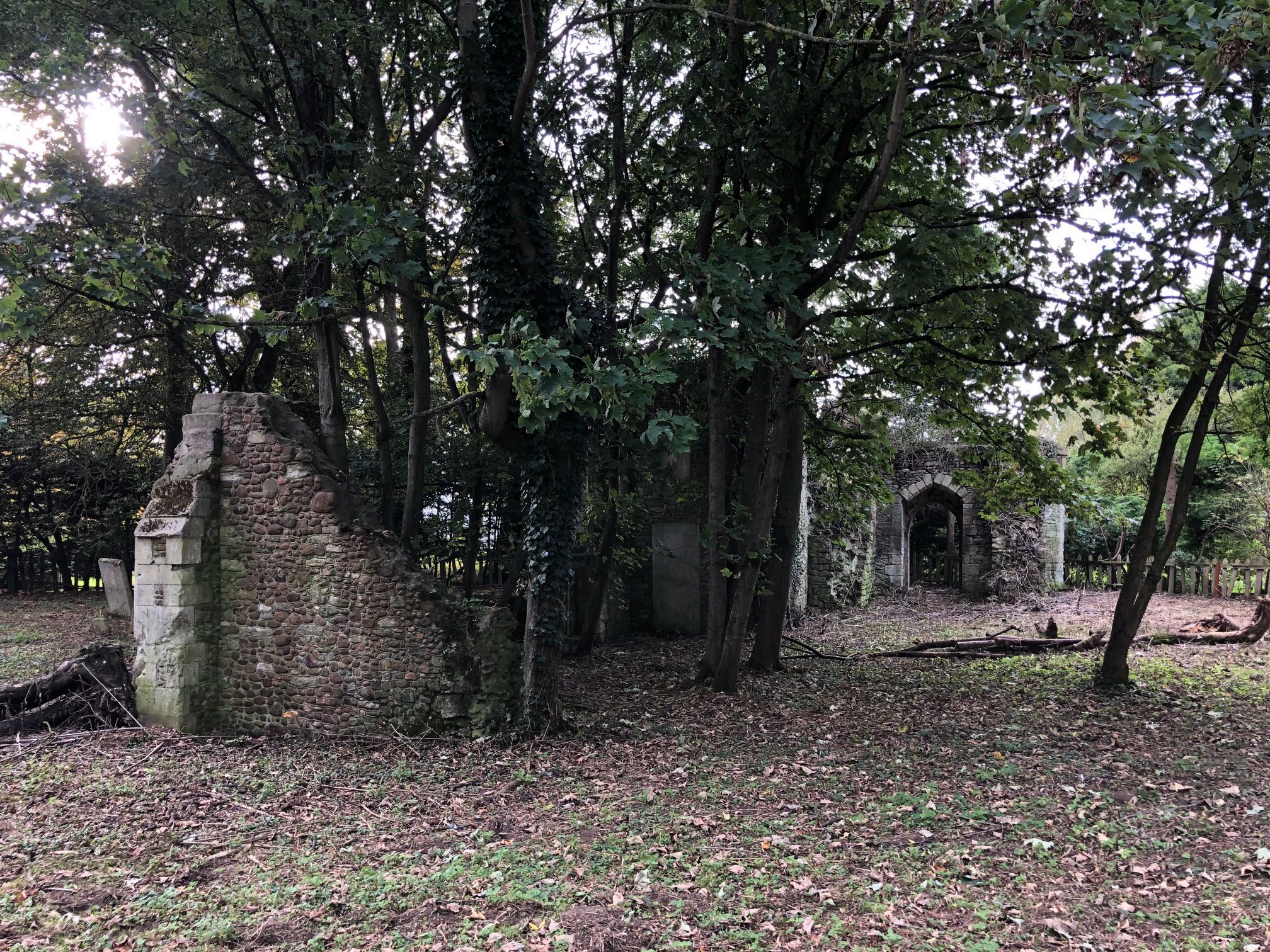
St Mary's church, Woolley, Cambridgeshire, from the east (2021)

== Government ==
Woolley is part of the civil parish of'Barham and Woolley which has a parish council. The parish council is elected by the residents of the parish who have registered on the electoral roll; the parish council is the lowest tier of government in England. A parish council is responsible for providing and maintaining a variety of local services including allotments and a cemetery; grass cutting and tree planting within public open spaces such as a village green or playing fields. The parish council reviews all planning applications that might affect the parish and makes recommendations to Huntingdonshire District Council, which is the local planning authority for the parish. The parish council also represents the views of the parish on issues such as local transport, policing and the environment. The parish council raises its own tax to pay for these services, known as the parish precept, which is collected as part of the Council Tax. On 1 April 1935 the parish of Woolley was abolished to form "Barham and Woolley".

Woolley was in the historic and administrative county of Huntingdonshire until 1965. From 1965, the village was part of the new administrative county of Huntingdon and Peterborough. Then in 1974, following the Local Government Act 1972, Woolley became a part of the county of Cambridgeshire.

The second tier of local government is Huntingdonshire District Council which is a non-metropolitan district of Cambridgeshire and has its headquarters in Huntingdon. Huntingdonshire District Council has 52 councillors representing 29 district wards. Huntingdonshire District Council collects the council tax, and provides services such as building regulations, local planning, environmental health, leisure and tourism. Woolley is a part of the district ward of Ellington, represented on the district council by one councillor. District councillors serve for four-year terms following elections to Huntingdonshire District Council.

For Woolley the highest tier of local government is Cambridgeshire County Council which has administration buildings in Cambridge. The county council provides county-wide services such as major road infrastructure, fire and rescue, education, social services, libraries and heritage services. Cambridgeshire County Council consists of 69 councillors representing 60 electoral divisions. Woolley is part of the electoral division of Sawtry and Ellington and is represented on the county council by one councillor.

At Westminster Woolley is in the parliamentary constituency of North West Cambridgeshire, and elects one Member of Parliament (MP) by the first past the post system of election. Woolley is represented in the House of Commons by Shailesh Vara (Conservative). Shailesh Vara has represented the constituency since 2005. The previous member of parliament was Brian Mawhinney (Conservative) who represented the constituency between 1997 and 2005.

== Demography ==
=== Population ===
In the period 1801 to 1901 the population of Woolley was recorded every ten years by the UK census. During this time the population was in the range of 40 (the lowest was in 1901) and 114 (the highest was in 1861).

From 1901, a census was taken every ten years with the exception of 1941 (due to the Second World War).

Parish	1911	1921	1931	1951	1961	1971	1981	1991	2001	2011
Woolley	54	42	29							

All population census figures from report Historic Census figures Cambridgeshire to 2011 by Cambridgeshire Insight.

== Notable people ==
- Nikephor Alphery
