= St Andrew's Church, Steeple Gidding =

Coordinates: 52.4185°N 0.3369°W

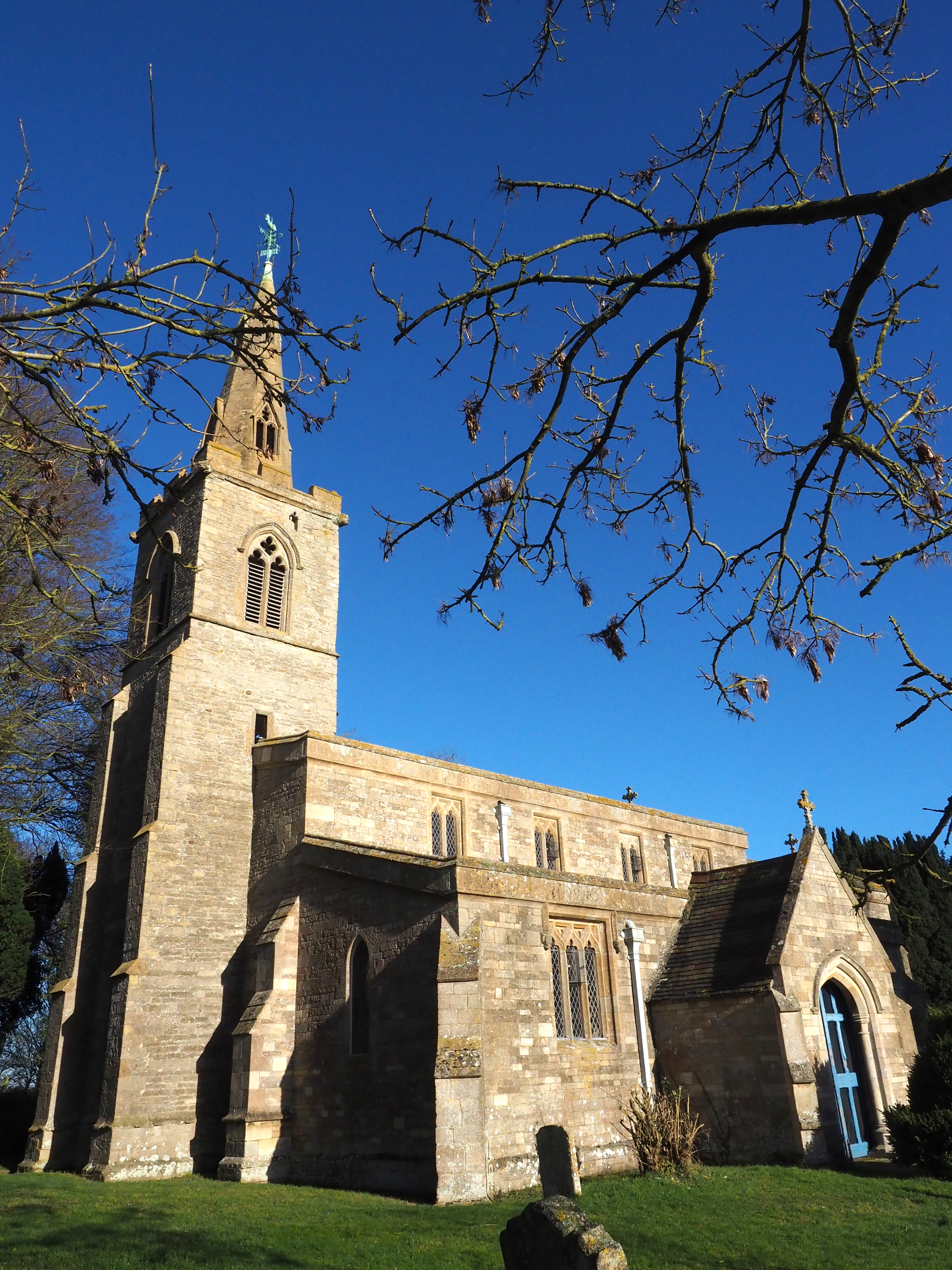
- St Andrew's Church, Steeple Gidding, from the southwest

- Location in Cambridgeshire
- OS grid reference: TL 133 813
- Location: Steeple Gidding, Cambridgeshire
- Country: England
- Denomination: Anglican
- Website: Churches Conservation Trust

History
- Dedication: Saint Andrew

Architecture
- Functional status: Redundant
- Heritage designation: Grade II*
- Designated: 28 January 1958
- Architectural type: Church
- Style: Norman, Gothic

St Andrew's Church is a redundant Anglican church in the hamlet of Steeple Gidding, about 10 miles (16 km) northwest of Huntingdon, Cambridgeshire, England. It is recorded in the National Heritage List for England as a designated Grade II* listed building, and is under the care of the Churches Conservation Trust.

== History ==
The oldest surviving part of the church is the south doorway which dates from the 12th century. Some stone from the 13th century has been incorporated elsewhere into the fabric. The south aisle and its arcade were built in the 14th century, and in about 1330 the chancel was built and the nave was rebuilt. The west tower was added in the late 14th century. In 1874 a new south porch was built to replace an older porch, and the chancel, nave and aisle were restored. Restoration of the tower took place in 1899.

== Architecture ==
The church is constructed in rubble and ashlar, with dressings in Ketton and Barnack stone; it has a lead roof. Its plan consists of a nave with a south aisle, a clerestory, and a south porch, a chancel, and a west tower which is partly enclosed within the nave. The tower is in two stages and stands on a moulded plinth. It has an embattled parapet with gargoyles at the corners, and an octagonal spire. The gabled porch stands in centre of the south aisle, and leads to the Norman south doorway. In the south wall of the aisle are two three-light windows, one on each side of the porch. Along the south wall of the clerestory are four two-light windows. The chancel contains two two-light windows dating from about 1330, and a south doorway.

Inside the church, there is a four-bay arcade carried on octagonal piers. In the chancel is a 14th-century piscina, and a three-seated sedilia. There is another 14th-century piscina in the south aisle. The font dates from the 16th century and consists of an octagonal bowl in Ketton stone on an octagonal stem, standing on a chamfered base. Its oak cover dates possibly from the 17th century. Near the south door is a 12th-century stoup. Also in the church are memorials from the 17th century, the oldest being dated 1640.
