= Denton and Caldecote =

Civil parish in Cambridgeshire, England

Coordinates: 52.478°N 0.313°W

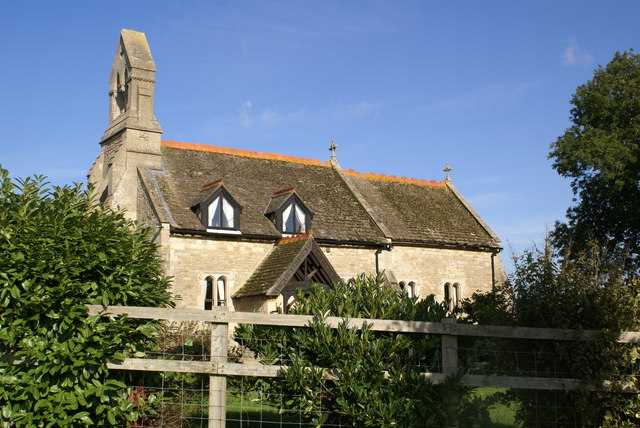
- Caldecote

- Location within Cambridgeshire
- Population: 76 (2011)
- Civil parish: Denton and Caldecote
- District: Huntingdonshire
- Shire county: Cambridgeshire
- Region: East
- Country: England
- Sovereign state: United Kingdom

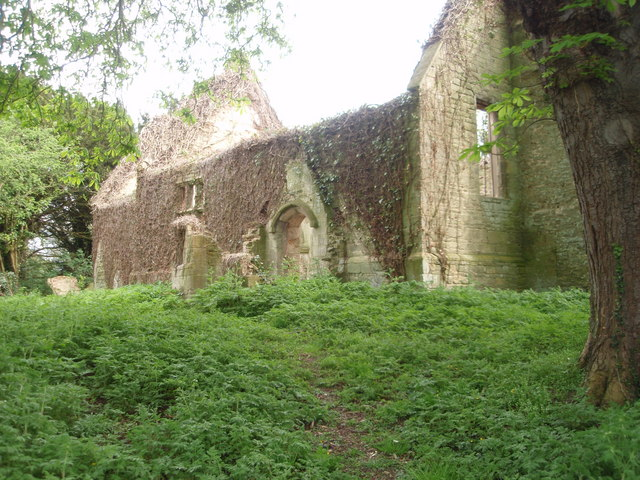
Denton

Denton and Caldecote – in Huntingdonshire (now part of Cambridgeshire), England – is a civil parish near Glatton south west of Yaxley. The parish was formed on 1 April 1935 from "Caldecote" and "Denton". In 2011 it had a population of 76.

== Demography ==
=== Population ===
In the period 1801 to 1901 the population of Denton and Caldecote was recorded every ten years by the UK census. During this time the population was in the range of 83 (the lowest was in 1891) and 157 (the highest was in 1861).

From 1901, a census was taken every ten years with the exception of 1941 (due to the Second World War).

Parish	1911	1921	1931	1951	1961	1971	1981	1991	2001	2011
Caldecote	28	36	27							
Denton	67	66	76							
Denton and Caldecote	95	102	103	108	89	73	62	60	75	76

All population census figures from report Historic Census figures Cambridgeshire to 2011 by Cambridgeshire Insight.
