= Island Hall =

Grade II* listed Georgian mansion in Godmanchester

Coordinates: 52°19′16.23″N 0°10′34.86″W

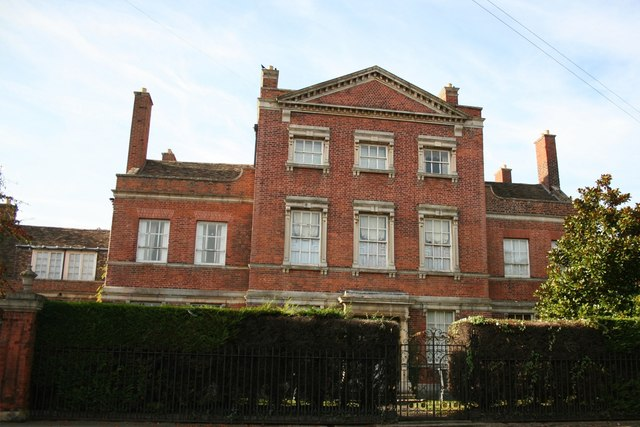
Island Hall (2007)

Island Hall is a Grade II* listed Georgian mansion located near the River Great Ouse in Godmanchester, Cambridgeshire, England.

== History ==
Named after a two-acre ornamental island on the River Great Ouse, the house was built in 1749 as a combined 21st birthday and wedding present for John Jackson, the receiver general for Huntingdonshire, and his family. He sold it to Jacob Julian Baumgartner in 1804 for 2,000 guineas in order to pay his debts.

It remained a family house until the Second World War, where it was requisitioned and used by the Royal Air Force's Women's Auxiliary Air Force and Pathfinder squadron in 1942. The garden was used for Nissen huts.

After the war, the building became the property of the Huntingdonshire District Council under the Emergency Housing Act and was converted into 15 council flats.

During the 1977 Firemen's Strike, a fire broke out on the ground floor. It was brought under control, but broke out again during the night, severely damaging the south wing. The main body of the house was unaffected.

After the fire in 1979, the house was sold to the Heritage family, who initiated a major restoration process. The Nissen huts and internal partitions were removed from the garden and building, respectively, and the fire damage was cleaned up.

The custodianship of Island Hall in December 2020 has passed to Grace Vane Percy and her family who continuous the renovation and restoration of this historic family home.

== Bridge ==
A Chinese style bridge, being Godmanchester's first, connects Island Hall with the island that it was named after. The bridge was built around the same time as the building.

== Access ==
The house and gardens are now privately owned.
