= Barham, Huntingdonshire =

Village in Cambridgeshire, England

Coordinates: 52.36°N 0.33°W

Barham
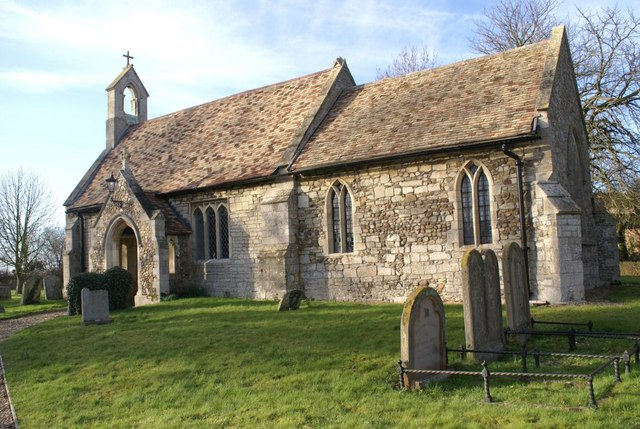
- Barham Church

- Location within Cambridgeshire
- Population: 36
- OS grid reference: TL137749
- Civil parish: Barham and Woolley
- District: Huntingdonshire
- Shire county: Cambridgeshire
- Region: East
- Country: England
- Sovereign state: United Kingdom
- Post town: Huntingdon
- Postcode district: PE28
- Dialling code: 01480
- Police: Cambridgeshire
- Fire: Cambridgeshire
- Ambulance: East of England
- UK Parliament: North West Cambridgeshire

Barham is a village and former civil parish, now in the parish of Barham and Woolley, in Cambridgeshire, England. Barham lies approximately 7 miles (11 km) west of Huntingdon. Barham is situated within Huntingdonshire which is a non-metropolitan district of Cambridgeshire as well as being a historic county of England. In 1931 the parish had a population of 34.

Barham has over time been known by various spellings. Bercheham (11th Century) Bercham, Bergham, Berwham, Berewam, Bereuham, Beruham (13th Century) Barram, Barrham (16th Century) Barham (Modern)

Barham is around 200 feet above sea level. The church dates from the 12th Century with a modern late Norman doorway.

== Government ==
Barham is part of the civil parish of Barham and Woolley, which has a parish council. The parish council is elected by the residents of the parish who have registered on the electoral roll; the parish council is the lowest tier of government in England. A parish council is responsible for providing and maintaining a variety of local services including allotments and a cemetery; grass cutting and tree planting within public open spaces such as a village green or playing fields. The parish council reviews all planning applications that might affect the parish and makes recommendations to Huntingdonshire District Council, which is the local planning authority for the parish. The parish council also represents the views of the parish on issues such as local transport, policing and the environment. The parish council raises its own tax to pay for these services, known as the parish precept, which is collected as part of the Council Tax.

On 1 April 1935 the parish of Barham was abolished to form "Barham and Woolley". Barham was in the historic and administrative county of Huntingdonshire until 1965. From 1965, the village was part of the new administrative county of Huntingdon and Peterborough. Then in 1974, following the Local Government Act 1972, Barham became a part of the county of Cambridgeshire.

The second tier of local government is Huntingdonshire District Council which is a non-metropolitan district of Cambridgeshire and has its headquarters in Huntingdon. Huntingdonshire District Council has 52 councillors representing 29 district wards. Huntingdonshire District Council collects the council tax, and provides services such as building regulations, local planning, environmental health, leisure and tourism. Barham is part of the district ward of Ellington and is represented on the district council by one councillor. District councillors serve for four-year terms following elections to Huntingdonshire District Council.

For Barham the highest tier of local government is Cambridgeshire County Council which has administration buildings in Cambridge. The county council provides county-wide services such as major road infrastructure, fire and rescue, education, social services, libraries and heritage services. Cambridgeshire County Council consists of 69 councillors representing 60 electoral divisions. Barham is a part of the electoral division of Sawtry and Ellington and is represented on the county council by one councillor. County councillors serve for four-year terms following elections to Cambridgeshire County Council.

At Westminster, Barham is in the parliamentary constituency of North West Cambridgeshire and elects one Member of Parliament (MP) by the first past the post system of election. Barham and is represented in the House of Commons by Shailesh Vara (Conservative). Shailesh Vara has represented the constituency since 2005. The previous member of parliament was Brian Mawhinney (Conservative) who represented the constituency between 1997 and 2005.

== Demography ==
=== Population ===
In the period 1801 to 1901 the population of Barham was recorded every ten years by the UK census. During this time the population was in the range of 57 (the lowest in 1891) and 115 (the highest in 1861).

From 1901, a census was taken every ten years with the exception of 1941 (due to the Second World War).

Parish	1911	1921	1931	1951	1961	1971	1981	1991	2001	2011
Barham	49	43	34							

All population census figures from report Historic Census figures Cambridgeshire to 2011 by Cambridgeshire Insight.

The separate parishes of Barham and Woolley were combined into a single parish in 1935.

== Culture and Community ==
In Barham there is a Bed and Breakfast, Ye Olde Globe and Chequers. The Victorian guest house in the village, first dwelling on this site was built in the 16th century and was lost to fire in 1855. The brewhouse was saved and the dwelling that now stands became the village inn known as The Globe and even though the brew house was demolished the Inn served the village up until 1965. The original stable block built for the dray houses and the blacksmith's forge has subsequently been converted and are now part of the guest house.
