= Abbotsley =

Village in Cambridgeshire, England

Coordinates: 52.19299°N 0.20533°W

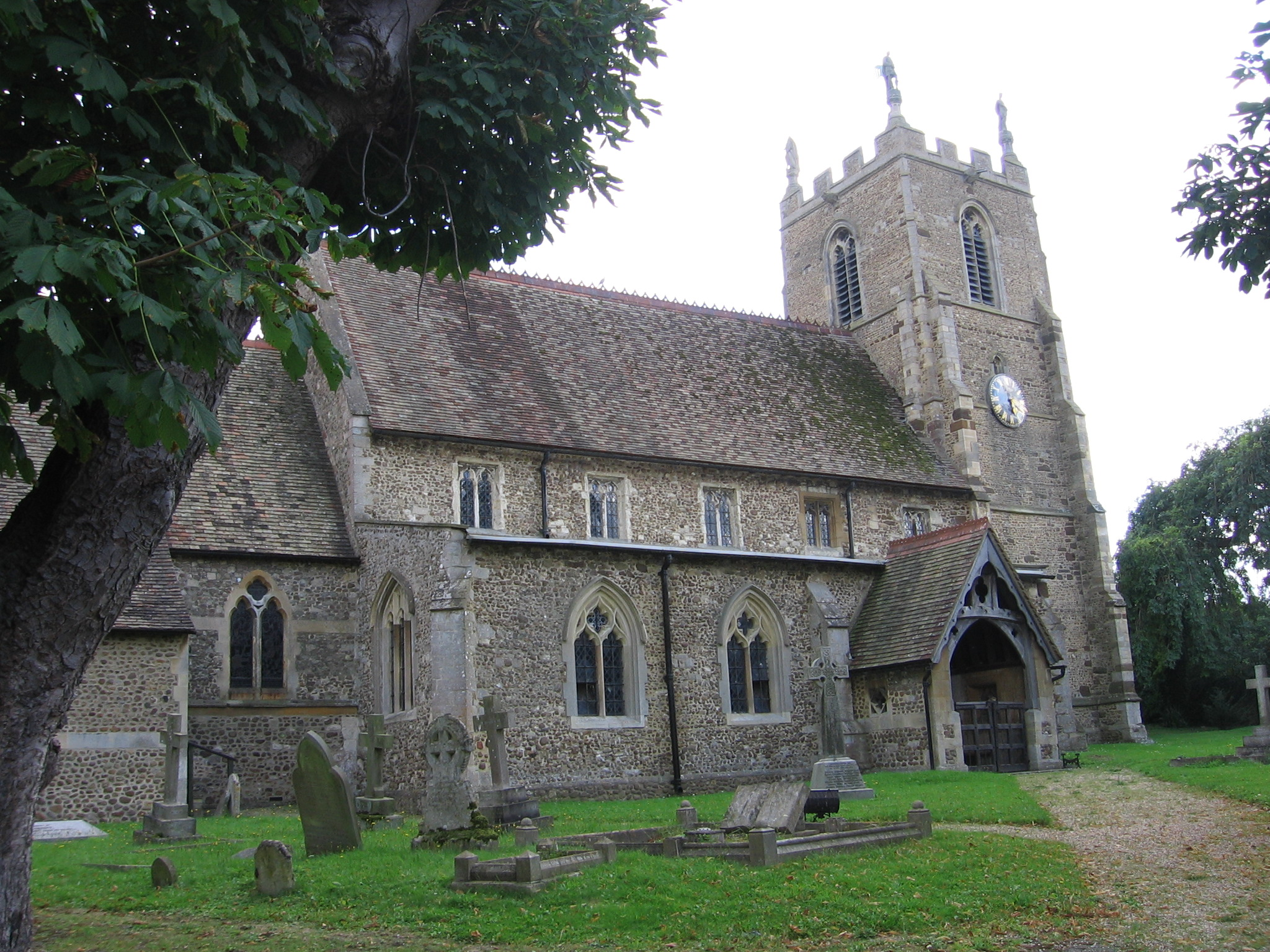
- St Margaret's Church, Abbotsley

- Location within Cambridgeshire
- Population: 446 (2011)
- OS grid reference: TL227564
- District: Huntingdonshire
- Shire county: Cambridgeshire
- Region: East
- Country: England
- Sovereign state: United Kingdom
- Post town: St Neots
- Postcode district: PE19
- Dialling code: 01767
- Police: Cambridgeshire
- Fire: Cambridgeshire
- Ambulance: East of England
- UK Parliament: Huntingdon

Abbotsley is a village and civil parish within the Huntingdonshire district of Cambridgeshire, England. It is three miles from St Neots and 14 miles from the county town of Cambridge. At the time of the 2001 census, the resident population was 425 people living in 164 households. increasing to a population of 446 at the 2011 Census, however its population decreased to 420 in the 2021 census.

== History ==
The village's name is derived from 'woodland clearing of a man called Ealdbeald' (Old English personal name Eadbald + lēah) The name is recorded as Adboldesl’ in the 12th century, as Adboldeslee and Albedesleg in the 13th century, Albo(t)deste(g), Albo(t)desley and Abbodesle in the 13th-14th century, and Abbot(t)esle(y) from late 13th to late 15th century.

Twenty to twenty first centuries

In 1876, the village of Eynesbury and part of the rural parish were included in the district controlled by the Local Board of St Neots. A further rearrangement was made in 1895, when Eynesbury was divided into two civil parishes. The urban portion of 394 acres was now called the parish of Eynesbury, and included in the St Neots Urban District; the rest, with 2,641 acres of land, formed the parish of Eynesbury Hardwicke. in 2010, the parish of Eynesbury Hardwicke was abolished, and divided between Abbotsley and St Neots.

== Government ==
As a civil parish, Abbotsley has a parish council. Abbotsley parish council comprises seven councillors, a chairman and clerk. The second tier of local government is Huntingdonshire District Council which is a non-metropolitan district of Cambridgeshire and has its headquarters in Huntingdon. Abbotsley is a part of the district ward of Gransden and The Offords and is represented on the district council by two councillors. The highest tier of local government for Abbotsley is Cambridgeshire County Council which has administration buildings in Cambridge. Abbotsley is a part of the electoral division of Buckden, Gransden and The Offords and is represented on the county council by one councillor.

Abbotsley was in the historic and administrative county of Huntingdonshire until 1965. From 1965, the village was part of the new administrative county of Huntingdon and Peterborough. Then in 1974, following the Local Government Act 1972, Abbotsley became a part of the county of Cambridgeshire.

At Westminster, Abbotsley is in the parliamentary constituency of Huntingdon. Since 2024 the village has been represented in the House of Commons by Ben Obese-Jecty (Labour).

== Geography ==
Abbotsley village is 14 miles from the county town of Cambridge and 47 miles from London. It is on the B1046 road between Great Gransden and St Neots. The elevation of the parish is between 22 and 60 metres (72–197 feet) above sea level. The subsoil is Oxford and Ampthill clay.

== Demography ==
=== Population ===
In the period 1801 to 1901 the population of Abbotsley was recorded every ten years by the UK census. During this time the population was in the range of 287 (the lowest in 1801) and 498 (the highest in 1871).

From 1901, a census was taken every ten years with the exception of 1941 (due to the Second World War).

Parish	1911	1921	1931	1951	1961	1971	1981	1991	2001	2011
Abbotsley	328	321	263	283	263	307	346	346	425	446

All population census figures from report Historic Census figures Cambridgeshire to 2011 by Cambridgeshire Insight.

In 2011, the parish covered an area of 5,676 acres (2,297 hectares)

The ethnic group of all residents was white; 78% described themselves as Christian.

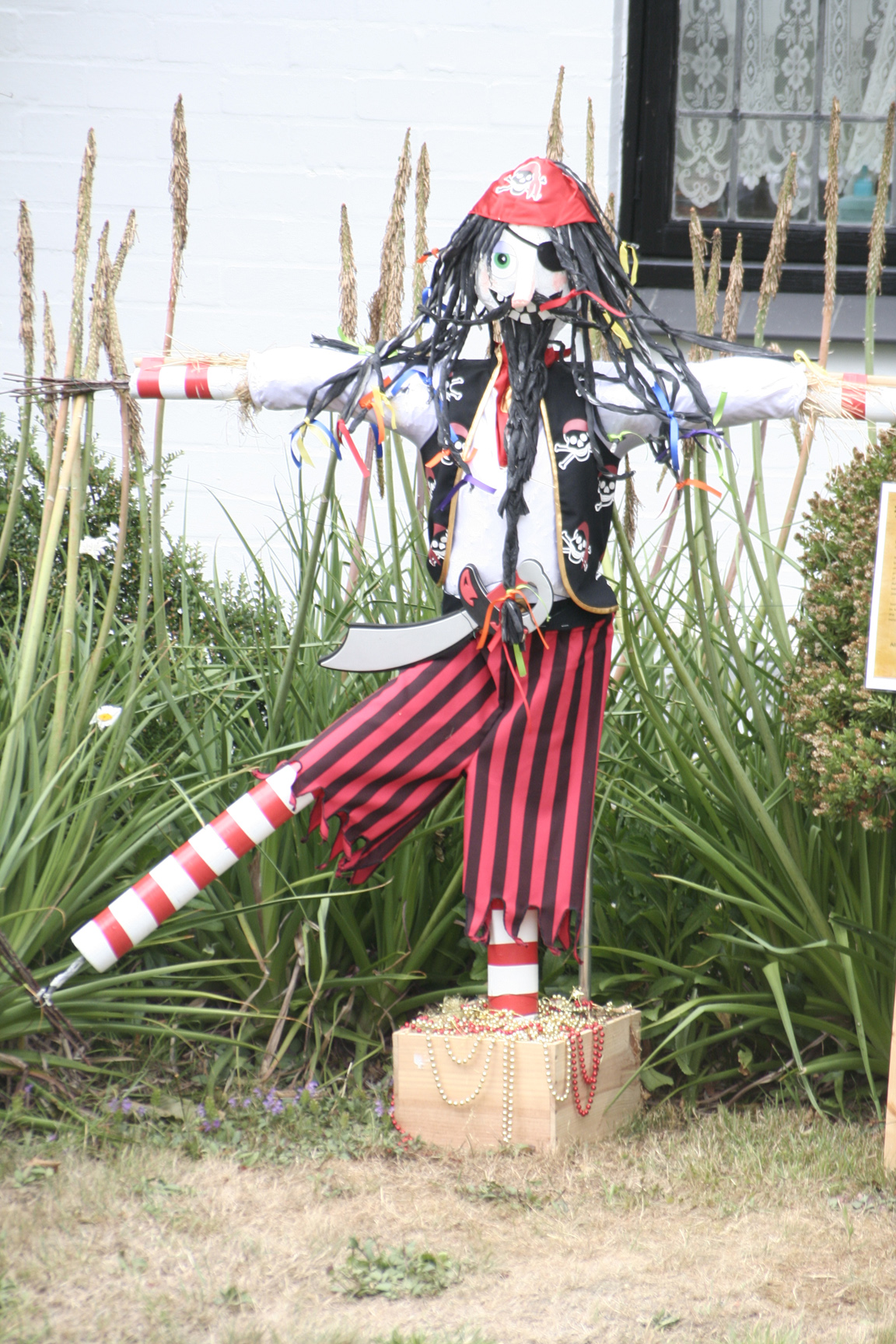
Scarecrow Festival Abbotsley

== Landmarks ==
A war memorial which stands in the churchyard commemorates Abbotsley men who died in the First and Second World Wars.

19 buildings in Abbotsley are listed (including the church). Among them are four houses along Blacksmiths Lane, nine houses along the High Street, a red telephone box and a table tomb in the churchyard.

== Religious sites ==
St Margaret's Church has stood in Abbotsley since around 1300, though there was a church in the village as early as 1138. The current building was restored in 1854 and 1861 and the tower in 1884; it is a Grade II* listed building. Abbotsley is part of the deanery of St Neots and diocese of Ely.

== Culture and community ==
A village hall is used for meetings, events and private functions. An annual Feast Week and Scarecrow Festival is held to raise money for maintenance of the village hall. Residents construct themed scarecrows and place them outside their houses for a week while there are various fundraising events held.

Michael Palin, the writer, Monty Python comedian and TV personality, was married at Abbotsley Church.
