= Barham and Woolley =

Civil parish in Cambridgeshire, England

Coordinates: 52.37°N 0.33°W

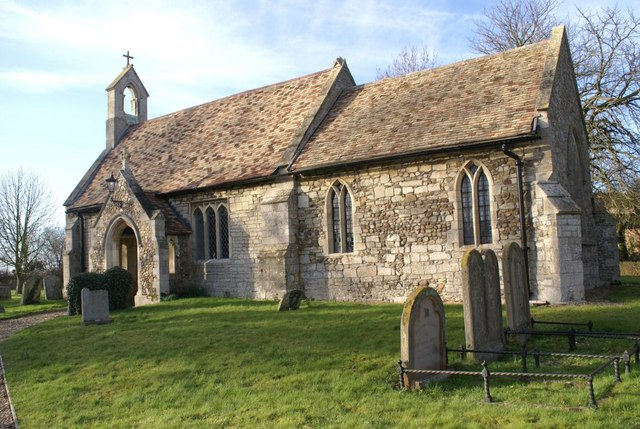
- Barham Church

- Location within Cambridgeshire
- Population: 61 (2011 Census)
- OS grid reference: TL136760
- District: Huntingdonshire
- Shire county: Cambridgeshire
- Region: East
- Country: England
- Sovereign state: United Kingdom
- Post town: Huntingdon
- Postcode district: PE28

Barham and Woolley is a civil parish in the Huntingdonshire district of Cambridgeshire, England. The parish includes the villages of Barham and Woolley.

== Demography ==
=== Population ===
In the period 1801 to 1901 the population of Barham and Woolley was recorded every ten years by the UK census. During this time the population was in the range of 97 (the lowest in 1901) and 229 (the highest in 1861).

From 1901, a census was taken every ten years with the exception of 1941 (due to the Second World War).

Parish	1911	1921	1931	1951	1961	1971	1981	1991	2001	2011
Barham and Woolley	103	85	63	72	78	71	60	53	51	61

All population census figures from report Historic Census figures Cambridgeshire to 2011 by Cambridgeshire Insight. The population figures prior to 1951 are calculated by combining the population figures for the two separate parishes of Barham and of Woolley.

In 2011, the parish covered an area of 1,893 acres (766 hectares) and so the population density for Barham & Woolley in 2011 was 20.6 persons per square mile (8 per square kilometre).
