= St Margaret's Church, Abbotsley =

Coordinates: 52.1935°N 0.2053°W

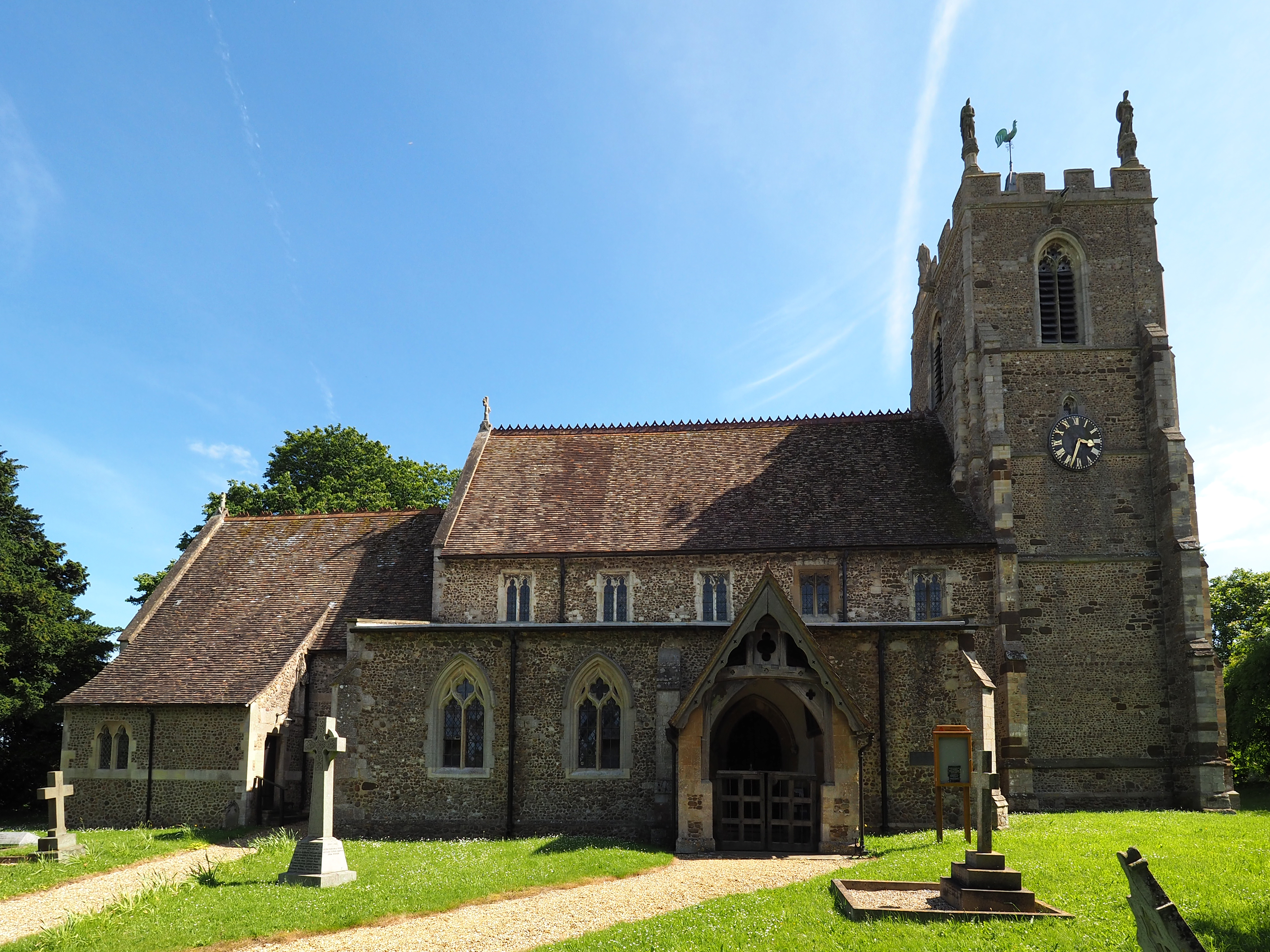
- St Margaret's Church, Abbotsley, from the north

- Location in Cambridgeshire
- OS grid reference: TL 227 565
- Location: Abbotsley, Cambridgeshire
- Country: England
- Denomination: Anglican
- Website: Churches Conservation Trust

Architecture
- Heritage designation: Grade II*
- Designated: 14 May 1959
- Architect(s): William Butterfield (1861 restoration)
- Architectural type: Church
- Style: Gothic, Gothic Revival

Specifications
- Materials: Pebblestone with dressings in stone and clunch

St Margaret's Church is a historic Anglican church in the village of Abbotsley, Cambridgeshire, England. It is recorded in the National Heritage List for England as a designated Grade II* listed building, and is under the care of The Churches Conservation Trust. The church stands in the centre of the village, to the south of the B1046 road.

== History ==
The earliest record of a church on the site is in about 1138, but the earliest surviving fabric in the present church dates from about 1300–10. The church at that time consisted of a nave, a chancel and a south aisle. About twenty years later a north aisle was added. Towards the end of the 14th century the tower was built, the nave was extended and the clerestory was added. A clock was added to the tower in the early 17th century. The church was restored in 1854. A further restoration was carried out in 1861 by William Butterfield, in the process of which the chancel, north vestry and north porch were rebuilt. The tower was restored in 1884. Although the church is now vested in the Churches Conservation Trust, its chancel is still used as a parish church.

== Architecture ==
=== Exterior ===
The church is constructed mainly in pebblestone, with dressings in stone and clunch. It is roofed in stone and lead. Its plan consists of a nave with a clerestory, north and south aisles, a north porch, a chancel with a north vestry, and a west tower. The tower is in four stages. It is set on a plinth, and has four buttresses and a staircase at the southwest angle. In the lowest stage is a west door, above which is a three-light window. The third stage contains one-light windows in the north and west walls, and a quartrefoil window in the south wall. There is a two-light bell opening on each side of the top stage. The summit has a battlemented parapet, with gargoyles in the centre of each side. At the corners, rather than pinnacles, there are statues of kings. These are said to represent the English kings Harold and William the Conqueror, and the Scottish kings Macbeth and Malcolm III.

The north aisle has a 14th-century two-light window in the west wall, and two similar windows in the north wall. Also in the north wall is a doorway, and a niche with a pointed head. In the east wall is a 15th-century three-light window, and two brackets supported by carved angels. The clerestory has five two-light square-headed windows on each side. In the north wall of the chancel are a two-light window and a small door. The west wall of the vestry contains a re-set 15th-century niche with a crocketed canopy, and another bracket supported by angels. The chancel east window has three lights, and in the south wall is a two-light window. In the east wall of the south aisle is a three-light window. The south wall contains two two-light windows, and a doorway with a 16th-century stoup to its east. In the west wall is another two-light window.

=== Interior ===
Both arcades have four bays. The piers of the north arcade consist of four grouped shafts, while those of the south arcade are octagonal. In the south wall of the chancel is a piscina and a sedilia. In the south wall of the south aisle is an elaborately carved tomb recess dating from the 14th century. Above the recess are two coats of arms. The 13th-century font consists of a tapering octagonal limestone bowl set on an octagonal base. Under the chancel arch is a 16th-century oak screen with three bays, including the central opening. There is a ring of five bells, the oldest being dated 1575.

== External features ==
In the churchyard is a table tomb dated 1688. It is constructed in limestone and on its sides are panels carved with emblems of mortality. The tomb is listed at Grade II.

== See also ==
- The Churches Conservation Trust: St Margaret's Church, Abbotsley, Cambridgeshire
