= Great Gidding =

Village in Cambridgeshire, England

Coordinates: 52.434°N 0.358°W

- Location within Cambridgeshire
- Population: 363 (2011)
- OS grid reference: TL117830
- Civil parish: Great Gidding
- District: Huntingdonshire
- Shire county: Cambridgeshire
- Region: East
- Country: England
- Sovereign state: United Kingdom
- Post town: HUNTINGDON
- Postcode district: PE28
- Dialling code: 01832
- UK Parliament: North West Cambridgeshire

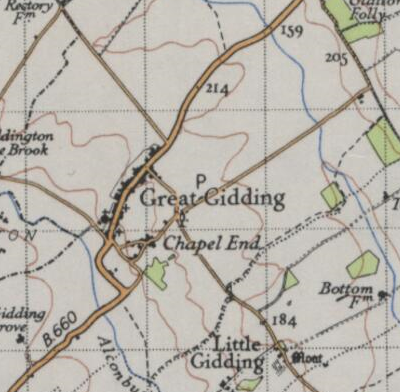
Obtained from the vision of Britain website

Great Gidding is a village and civil parish in the Huntingdonshire district of Cambridgeshire, England.

Great Gidding lies approximately 10 miles (16 km) north-west of Huntingdon. The village has a playing field, corner shop, village hall and several local businesses. There is one pub in the village, The Fox and Hounds. Surrounding towns and cities are Huntingdon, Oundle and Peterborough.

In 1870 Great Gidding was described as follows:

"GIDDING (Great), a parish in the district of Oundle and county of Huntingdon; on Alconbury brook, adjacent to Northamptonshire, 6 miles SW by S of Stilton, and 6½ SW of Holme r. station. Post town, Hamerton, under St."

At the 2011 Census, the parish had a population of 363.

== History ==
Great Gidding was listed as Geddinge, Gedelinge and Redinges in the Domesday Book in the Hundred of Leightonstone in Huntingdonshire. The village contained three manors and 40.5 households.

On 10 June 1944, the US 8th Air Force was sent in a Flying Fortress called Bam Bam from RAF Molesworth to Nantes to shut down the German airfield there. Bam Bam had already done 42 missions and the crew reported strong smell of fuel inside however they were told to continue in air they reported to control that the smell was getting constantly worse and wanted to return. Soon after, it exploded 1/4 of a mile SW of Great Gidding. Six out of the ten aircrew died and four survived. Due to the controversy that the crew raised concerns but were ordered to fly, this was kept a secret for 70 years until 2014

== Government ==
Great Gidding has a parish council consisting of six councillors. The second tier of local government is Huntingdonshire District Council. Great Gidding is part of Sawtry ward and returns two councillors to the council. District councillors serve for four-year terms following elections to Huntingdonshire District Council. The village's highest tier of local government is Cambridgeshire County Council. Great Gidding is part of the electoral division of Sawtry and Ellington and is represented on the county council by one councillor.

At Westminster Great Gidding is in the parliamentary constituency of North West Cambridgeshire, and has been represented in the House of Commons by Shailesh Vara (Conservative) since 2005.

Great Gidding was in the historic and administrative county of Huntingdonshire until 1965. From 1965, the village was part of the new administrative county of Huntingdon and Peterborough. Then in 1974, following the Local Government Act 1972, Great Gidding became a part of the county of Cambridgeshire.

== Geography ==
The village is near the Alconbury brook, which has a course of about 13 miles, rising near Lullington and joining the Ouse at Huntingdon. "The normal level of the Alconbury Brook at Hamerton in average weather conditions is between 1.05m and 1.87m."

== Demography ==
=== Population ===
In the period 1801 to 1901 the population of Great Gidding was recorded every ten years by the UK census. During this time the population was in the range of 337 (the lowest was in 1901) and 563 (the highest was in 1851).

From 1901, a census was taken every ten years with the exception of 1941 (due to the Second World War).

Parish	1911	1921	1931	1951	1961	1971	1981	1991	2001	2011
Great Gidding	313	271	274	252	239	209	297	304	304	363

All population census figures from report Historic Census figures Cambridgeshire to 2011 by Cambridgeshire Insight.

In 2011, the parish covered an area of 2,330 acres (943 hectares) and so the population density for Great Gidding in 2011 was 92.8 persons per square mile (35.8 per square kilometre).

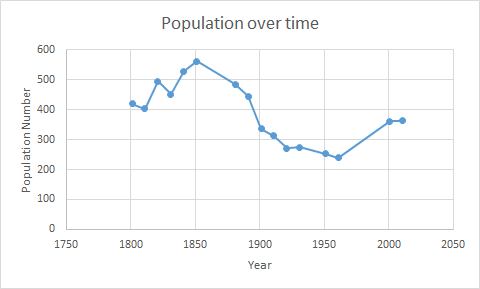
Total Population of Great Gidding civil parish Huntingdonshire as reported by the Census of Population from 1801–2011

In 1881, most workers were male and working in agriculture in comparison with the majority of women working in unknown category.

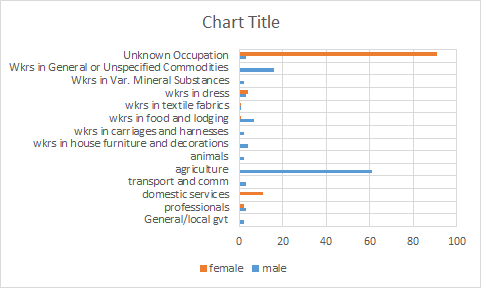
Occupations of Great Gidding residents (1881)

In the 2011 census, 195 people were employed: 38 worked in associate professional and technical occupations; 35 were managers, directors and senior officials; 34 were professionals; 23 were in the administrative sector; 10 were in elementary positions; six were in sales.

=== Age structure ===
Through comparing census data of both 2001 and 2011 we can see that in 2011 there were fewer young people but more old people. This is seen as in 2011 there were 101 people over 60 while 2001 had 73. In 2001 117 people were 29 and below while 2011 had only 106 people. Therefore, the mean age is different because in 2011 its 42.7 while 2001 was 37.57 This also gives further evidence to the current ageing population of the country

=== Marital and civil partnership status ===
In 2001 the large majority 173 out of 277 people were married, remarried or technically still married. 53 were widowed or divorced and 51 are single (never married). In 2011 however there was the added option of same-sex civil partnerships. Of this 4 out of the 304 people were in a same-sex civil partnership and 56.9% were married and 7 technically married. 24.7% were single (never married) while 45 people where divorced or widowed respectively.

=== Religion ===
In 2001, the village was 73% Christian and 11.6% no religion, with five people who identified as Hindu. In 2011, the village was 63% Christian and 21.5% no religion, with five Hindus, five Jews, four Muslims, and two Buddhists.

== Culture and community ==
In 2002 a small wood was planted in the northeast of the village with public access via a path to celebrate the Queen's Golden Jubilee. It has a range of trees including oak and ash.

== Education ==
The only school in Great Gidding, St Michael School, is now closed. The school is next to the church and was founded in 1845 by the Church of England but there is evidence of a school since 1750. In the past the role of headmaster went through families; for example, both Benjamin Horsford and his son Cornelius were headmasters from 1754. In 1944 the local education authority took over control but the school formerly had very strong links with the church for events such as Harvest and Easter.

== Transport ==
Public transport to Great Gidding consists of one bus a week to Oundle and Huntingdon and one a month to Peterborough.67.6% of residents do not use the public buses. The main road is the B660.

== Religious sites ==
The main church is called St. Michael. It has been recorded in historical reports since the 13th century, although it is not mentioned in the Domesday Book. From September 2019, the Benefice Rector has been Revd. Mandy Flaherty, with Revd. Canon Fiona Brampton as Associate Priest. After being in poor condition it was restored in 1870, and again in 1925. There are five bells at St Michael and many stained-glass windows as well as weathered gargoyles. It also contains a war memorial in the form of a stone plaque for the fallen, listing 36 names for World War I and 37 for World War II.
