= Ely Rural District =

Former local government area in the UK

Coordinates: 52.415°N 0.161°E

- Rural district
- Area
  - 1901: 63,999 acres (259.0 km^{2})
  - 1961: 66,082 acres (267.4 km^{2})
- Population
  - 1901: 12,383
  - 1971: 14,820
- History
  - Created: 28 December 1894
  - Abolished: 31 March 1974
  - Succeeded by: East Cambridgeshire
  - HQ: Ely

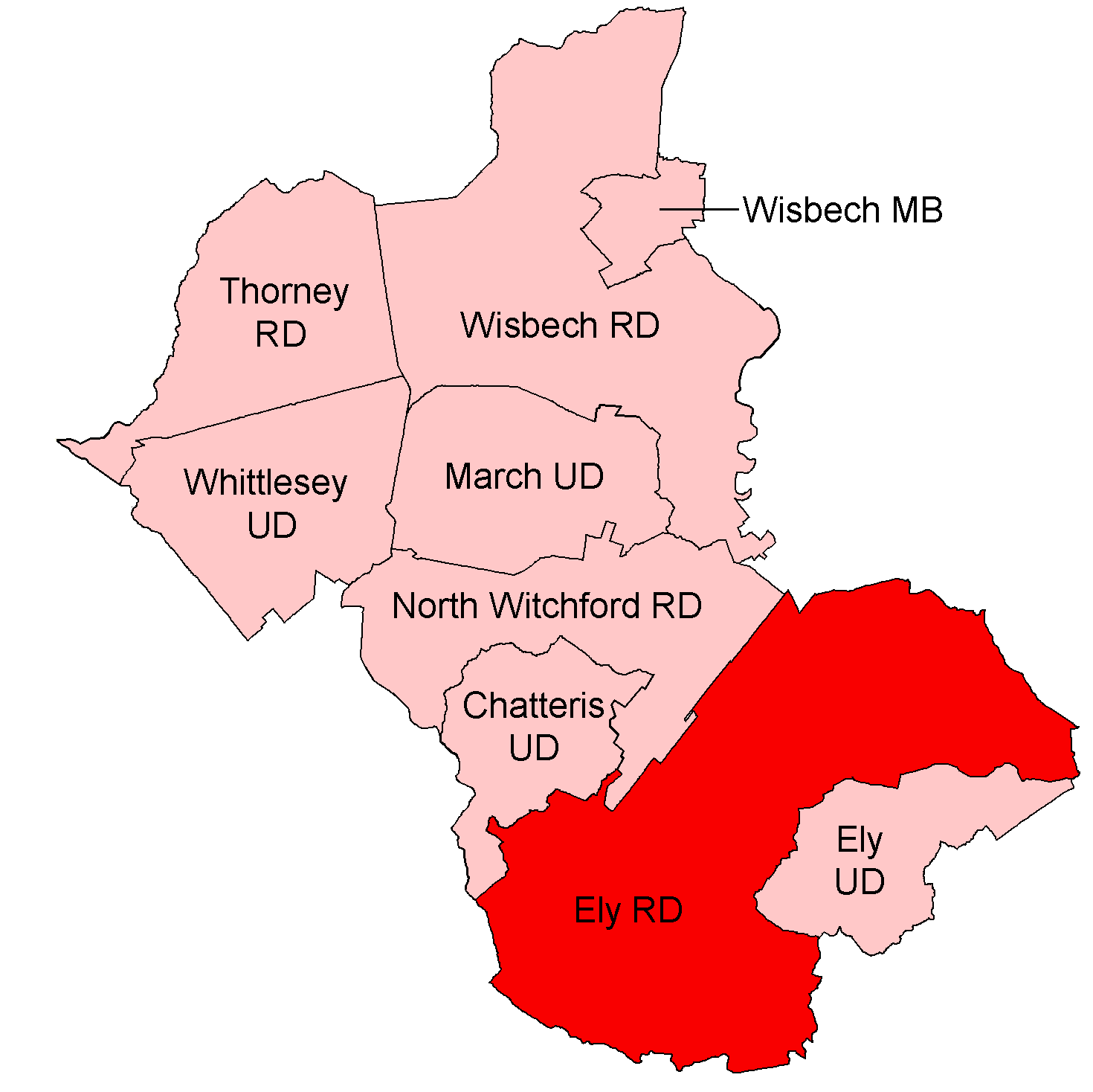
Position within Isle of Ely, 1935

Ely Rural District was a rural district in England from 1894 to 1974. It was named after Ely, but did not include the city itself, instead covering the rural area to the west and north of it. It formed part of the administrative county of the Isle of Ely from 1894 to 1965, when this was merged into Cambridgeshire and Isle of Ely.

== History ==
The district had its origins in the Ely Poor Law Union, which had been created in 1836, covering Ely and several surrounding parishes. In 1872 sanitary districts were established, giving public health and local government responsibilities for rural areas to the existing boards of guardians of poor law unions. The Ely Rural Sanitary District therefore covered the area of the poor law union except for Ely itself, which already had a local board of health and so formed its own urban sanitary district. The Ely Rural Sanitary District was administered from Ely Union Workhouse, which had been built in 1837 at Tower Road in Ely.

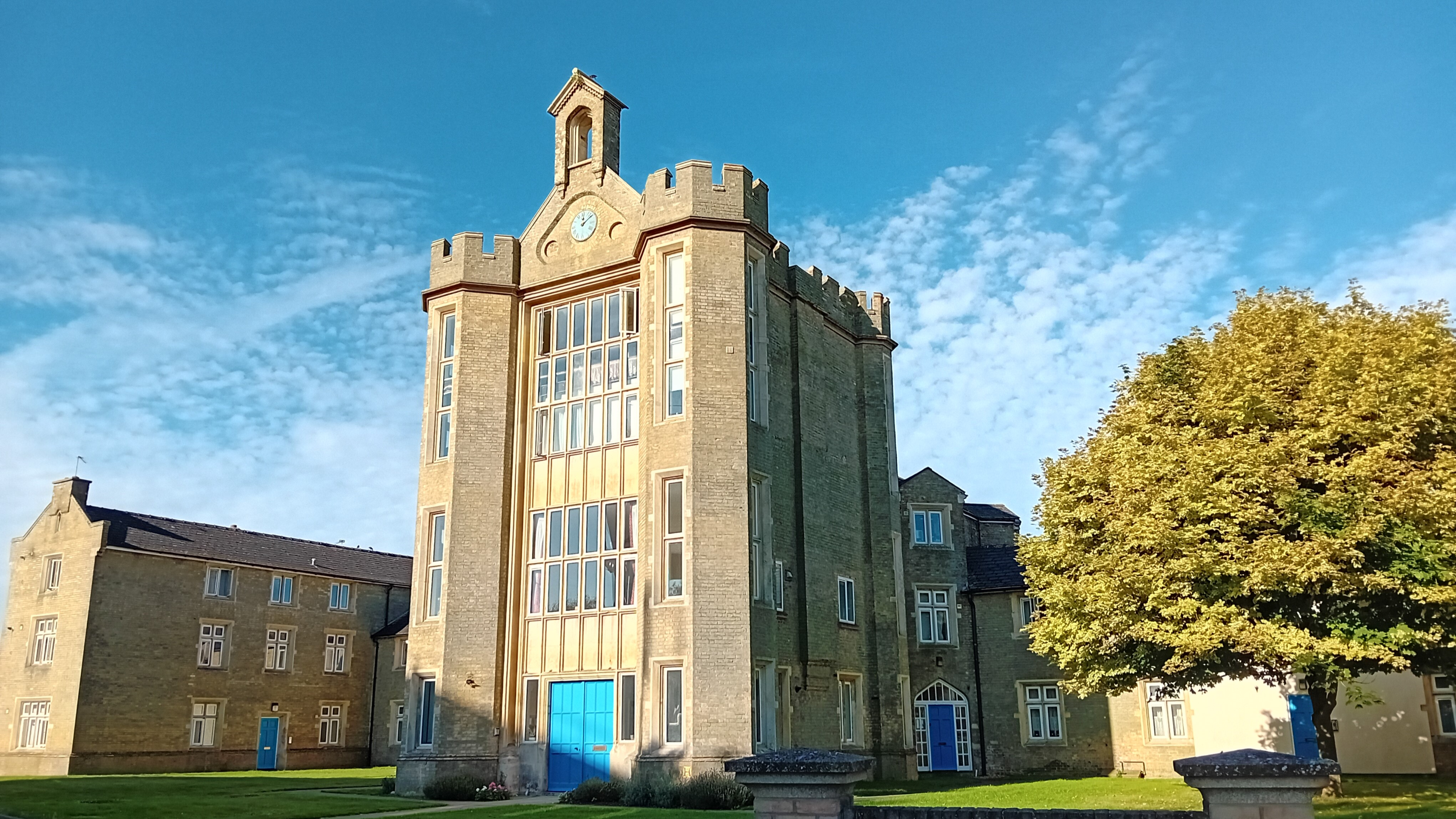
Ely Union Workhouse: Council's meeting place until 1940s.

Under the Local Government Act 1894, rural sanitary districts became rural districts from 28 December 1894. The act also specified that rural sanitary districts which straddled county boundaries should be split into separate rural districts for the part in each county. Whilst most of the Ely Rural Sanitary District was in the Isle of Ely, it also contained Redmere, a small parish in Norfolk which had a population of about 40. An inquiry was held and it was decided to amend the county boundary to transfer Redmere from Norfolk into the Isle of Ely. In the event the change of county boundary did not take effect until 30 September 1895, a few months after Ely Rural District had come into being, and Redmere was therefore briefly a rural district on its own. However, the act allowed for such small rural districts to be temporarily administered by the district from which they had been separated, as long as separate accounts were kept. In practice therefore, Redmere Rural District was an accounting distinction; it was always administered by Ely Rural District.

Ely Rural District Council held its first meeting on 3 January 1895 at the workhouse, when James Luddington of Littleport, a Conservative, was appointed the first chairman of the council.

In 1974 Ely Rural District was abolished, and its area made part of the new East Cambridgeshire district of Cambridgeshire.

== Parishes ==
The district comprised the parishes of:

- Coveney
- Downham
- Grunty Fen
- Haddenham
- Littleport
- Mepal
- Redmere (abolished 1933 and absorbed into Littleport)
- Stretham
- Sutton
- Thetford
- Wentworth
- Wilburton
- Witcham
- Witchford

== Statistics ==
Year	Area (ha)	Population	Density (pop/ha)
1911	25,900	12,916	0.50
1921	25,900	12,883	0.50
1931	25,900	13,532	0.52
1951	26,743	14,717	0.55
1961	26,743	14,442	0.54

== Premises ==
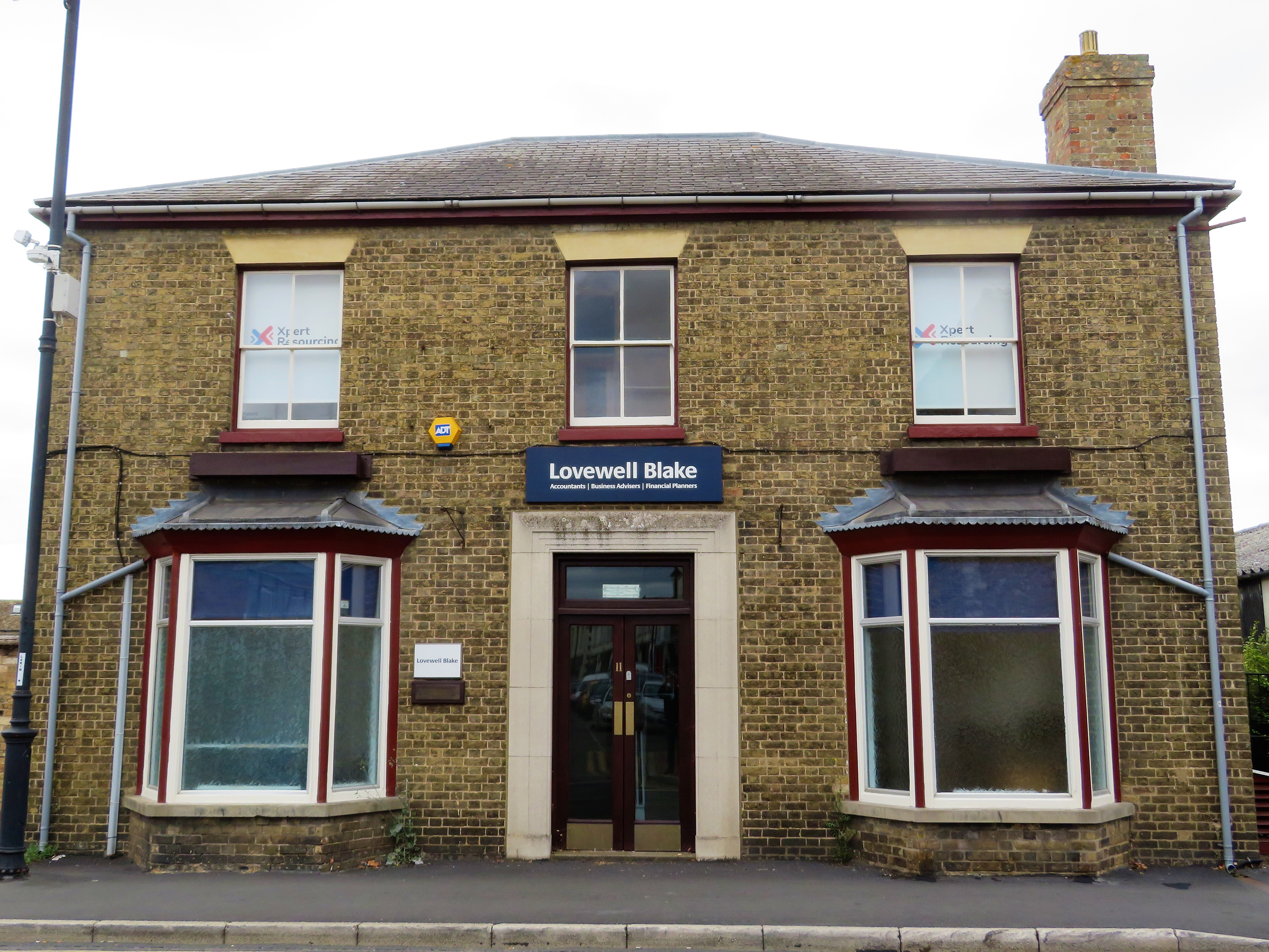
11 Lynn Road, Ely: Council's headquarters c. 1921–1974

The council continued to meet at the workhouse, later called Tower House, until the late 1940s. Tower House became Tower Hospital following the creation of the National Health Service in 1948, after which the council moved its meeting place to the council chamber at its neighbour Ely Urban District Council's offices at 6 Lynn Road in Ely. From the early 1920s until the council's abolition in 1974, Ely Rural District Council's staff were based at offices at 11 Lynn Road in Ely.
