= Little Thetford =

Village in Cambridgeshire, England

Coordinates: 52.36°N 0.25°E

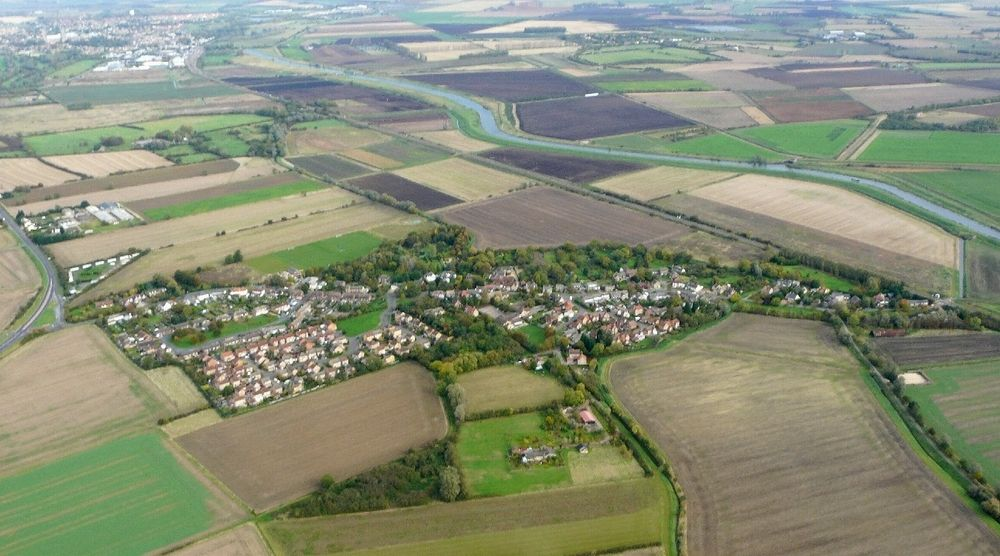
- Little Thetford looking north-east. Ely is north—top left. The A10 road at Thetford corner is west and the River Great Ouse is east. The south-west block of housing is where the Iron Age settlement and Romano-British tile kiln were found.

- Location within Cambridgeshire
- Area: 2 sq mi (5.2 km^{2})
- Population: 744 (2021)
  - Density: 372/sq mi (144/km^{2})
- OS grid reference: TL530764
  - London: 62 mi (100 km) S
- Civil parish: Thetford
- District: East Cambridgeshire
- Shire county: Cambridgeshire
- Region: East
- Country: England
- Sovereign state: United Kingdom
- Post town: ELY
- Postcode district: CB6
- Dialling code: 01353
- Police: Cambridgeshire
- Fire: Cambridgeshire
- Ambulance: East of England
- UK Parliament: South East Cambridgeshire
- Website: ECDC

Little Thetford /ˈθɛtfɔːrd/ is a small village in the civil parish of Thetford, 3 miles (5 km) south of Ely in Cambridgeshire, England, about 76 miles (122 km) by road from London. The village is built on a boulder clay island surrounded by flat fenland countryside, typical of settlements in this part of the East of England.

During the Mesolithic era, the fenland basin was mostly dry and forested, although subject to salt and fresh water incursions. The marshes and meres of this fenland may therefore have been difficult to occupy, other than seasonally, but there is evidence of human settlement on the island since the late Neolithic Age; a Bronze Age causeway linked the village with the nearby Barway, to the south-east. An investigation undertaken before a 1995 development in the village discovered a farm and large tile-kiln of Romano-British origin; further investigations uncovered an earlier settlement of the Pre-Roman Iron Age. The Roman road Akeman Street passed through the north-west corner of the parish, and the lost 7th century Anglo-Saxon village of Cratendune may be nearby.

The 10th-century Old English name, lȳtel Thiutforda, suggests a ford across the nearby River Great Ouse, which today forms most of the village's eastern boundary. In 1007, an Anglo-Saxon noblewoman named Ælfwaru granted her lands in Cambridgeshire and Norfolk, including the "land at Thetford and the fisheries around those marshes", to the abbots of Ely Abbey; the village was still listed as a fishery in the Domesday Book, 79 years later. Pasture farming, and harvesting of reeds, peat, and rushes were the other dominant activities of the time. The draining of the land, which began in the 17th century, enabled arable farming activity that continues to this day. During the late 19th century, coprolite, a phosphate-rich fossil used as a fertiliser, was mined in shallow pits around the village.

Little Thetford resisted the parliamentary inclosure acts of William IV for seven years, which may have led to the strong Baptist following amongst the poor of the village. About half of Little Thetford was eventually enclosed under the Thetford Inclosure and Drainage Act 1844 (7 & 8 Vict. c.xxix) of Victoria.

The river flooding, which affected 30 counties in England during March 1947, caused the Great Ouse to break its banks at Little Thetford. Heavy rain following a very severe winter overwhelmed multiple rivers throughout England and eastern Wales. It was the worst flooding in over two hundred years. The dismantled Ely and St Ives Railway crossed the A10 road at Thetford corner. The Cambridge station to Ely station section of the Fen Line passes through the east of the village. Occupying an area of 2 square miles (5 km^{2}), and with a population of 792, Little Thetford is the smallest civil parish in the ward of Stretham; notable buildings in the village date from the 14th century.

== History ==
=== Prehistory and Roman period ===
There is evidence of human settlement at Little Thetford since the Neolithic Age. A 1996 search along the Anglian Water pipeline at Little Thetford—Cawdle Fen uncovered an important and unusually dense concentration of late Neolithic (3000–2201 BC) remains. This is unusual because, although the fenland basin was dry and forested during the Mesolithic era, the area was sometimes subject to marine incursions, and at other times, fresh-water flooding. This led to marshes and open water areas which may have been difficult to settle on—except perhaps for seasonal activity. A Neolithic polished flint axe (4000–2201 BC) was found in the village in 1984 at Bedwell Hey Farm. Fourteen pre-Roman flints of various finishes were also discovered in 1998 at the same site.

A more substantial Bronze Age settlement is known to have existed; the remains of what may have been a causeway were discovered in 1934, in the form of wooden piles unearthed by a farmer between Little Thetford and nearby Barway. A Bronze Age ring and a late Bronze Age sherd were excavated nearby. There have been a number of Bronze Age finds in the area, including a pre–701 BC palstave at nearby Fordey farm, Barway, and at Little Thetford, a middle Bronze Age (1600–1001 BC) rapier in 1953, and a late Bronze Age flesh-hook in 1929.

A Romano-British farm around 200 AD, largely built upon a previous Iron Age settlement dating from 200 to 100 BC, was discovered during the Watson's Lane development in 1994. Pre-Roman Iron Age and Romano-British pottery was found on the site, as well as human skeletal remains. A single-flue-chamber tile kiln was also uncovered. Roofing tile fragments were found near the kiln, including tegulae, imbrices, lydions, pedales and sesquipedales. The Roman road Akeman Street is three-quarters of a mile (1.2 km) due west of the village.

=== Medieval ===
A middle Saxon pendant dating from 601 to 700 AD was discovered in a field in Little Thetford in 1952. This 3-centimetre (1.18 in) diameter by 1-centimetre (0.39 in) thick pendant, made from rock-crystal, gold, garnet, and amethyst coloured-glass, has been worked in a lathe. The workmanship is not of a high standard. Æthelberht of Kent was said to have built a church at Cratendune around 600 AD, about a mile from what is now Ely Cathedral. In 673 AD, Æthelthryth considered restoring this church, thought to have been destroyed by Penda of Mercia, but instead made what is now Ely Cathedral the site of her monastery. An early Anglo-Saxon cemetery, used at some point between 410 and 1065 AD, was uncovered around 1945 near Little Thetford (52.376N, 0.2375E), and was thought to be this lost village of Cratendune. A deserted Saxon settlement, 410–1065 AD, examined in 1999 in Ely, may also be a candidate for this lost site of worship.

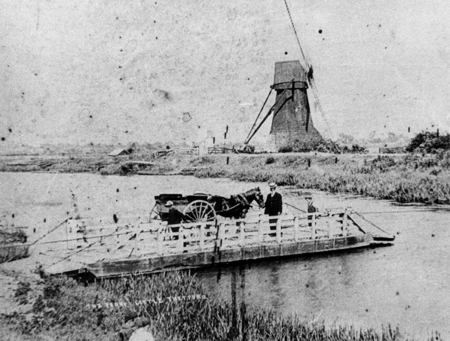
Chain ferry at Little Thetford c. 1905. Harrimere windmill is seen on the Barway side of the River Great Ouse.

Little Thetford means little public or people's ford—Old English lȳtel Thiutforda (c. 972) and Liteltedford [sic] (1086)—compare with Thetford, Norfolk—Old English Thēodford (late 9th century) and Tedfort (1086). The online Domesday Book records the settlement under the name Liteltetford [sic]. (Note: Liteltedford in Mills (1991–1998) Thetford, Little Cambs. Thiutforda c. 972, Liteltedford 1086 (DB). Affix is OE ltel; Liteltedford in Briggs, Keith (2010) Domesday Book place-name forms; Liteltedford in (2010) National Archives. Liteltetford in (1999–2010) The Domesday Book Online; Mills (1991–1998) Tetford Lincs. Tedforde 1086 (DB) 'People's or public ford'. OE Thēod + ford) The first written evidence that Ely Abbey had inherited the Little Thetford lands was in the 12th-century chronicle, Liber Eliensis. The will of Ælfwaru (d. 1007), an Anglo-Saxon noblewoman, granted estates in Cambridgeshire and Norfolk to the Abbey, which included "... that land at Thetford and fisheries around those marshes". In 1110, Hervey le Breton, Bishop of Ely, granted the manor to William Brito, his Archdeacon and also his nephew. Chapel Hill in the village, near the river, commemorates the site of Harrimere Chapel, used since 1381. Some of the stone from this chapel, dismantled in 1571, was used in the building of St George's Church. By 1539, the Little Thetford manor and its estates contained arable land, pasture, gardens, and orchards. In the mid-16th century, the antiquary William Bowyer owned the farm.

There was once a medieval windmill in Thetford Field, west of the main built up area of the village. This may have been the site of the look-out tower that village legend says had been used during the Norman Conquest by Hereward the Wake's defence of the Isle of Ely; (Note: Leaflet: St. George's Church, Little Thetford, History) a deserted settlement at this location may once have been the centre of the village. The stump of a late medieval (roughly 1540–1900 AD) windmill in the present centre of the village was converted into a house. The site of this mill is where the Roundhouse still stands. The Harrimere windmill was on the east bank of the River Great Ouse at Barway. The chain ferry linked Barway with Little Thetford.

=== Modern ===
The apothecary and botanist William Sole was born in Little Thetford in 1741 (Note: ODNB 2010 says was born Thetford, Norfolk. Dictionary of National Biography, 1885-1900, Volume 53 and parish records state that Sole was born in Little Thetford, Cambridgeshire) and educated at King's School, Ely. Sole was apprenticed to Robert Cory of Cambridge for five years; he followed this by setting up a solo apothecary practice in Bath and later a practice in partnership with Thomas West. Sole published Menthae Britannicae; he was one of the first elected associates of the Linnean Society of London, and Sprengel named the plant species Solea (now Viola) after him.

Thetford Inclosure and Drainage Act 1844
- Act of Parliament
- Parliament of the United Kingdom
- Long title: An Act for dividing, allotting, and inclosing Lands in the Hamlet of Thetford in the Parish of Streatham in the Isle of Ely and County of Cambridge; and for draining and embanking certain Parts of the said Lands, and other Lands in the said Hamlet, and in other Parishes in the said Isle and County.
- Citation: 7 & 8 Vict. c.xxix

Dates
- Royal assent: 23 May 1844

Thetford Drainage Act 1852
- Act of Parliament
- Parliament of the United Kingdom
- Long title: An Act to amend an Act passed in the Seventh Year of the Reign of Her Majesty Queen Victoria, for inclosing Lands in the Hamlet of Thetford in the Isle of Ely, and for draining certain Lands in the said Hamlet and in other Parishes in the said Isle, so far as relates to such draining.
- Citation: 15 & 16 Vict. c. xxix

Dates
- Royal assent: 28 May 1852

Text of statute as originally enacted

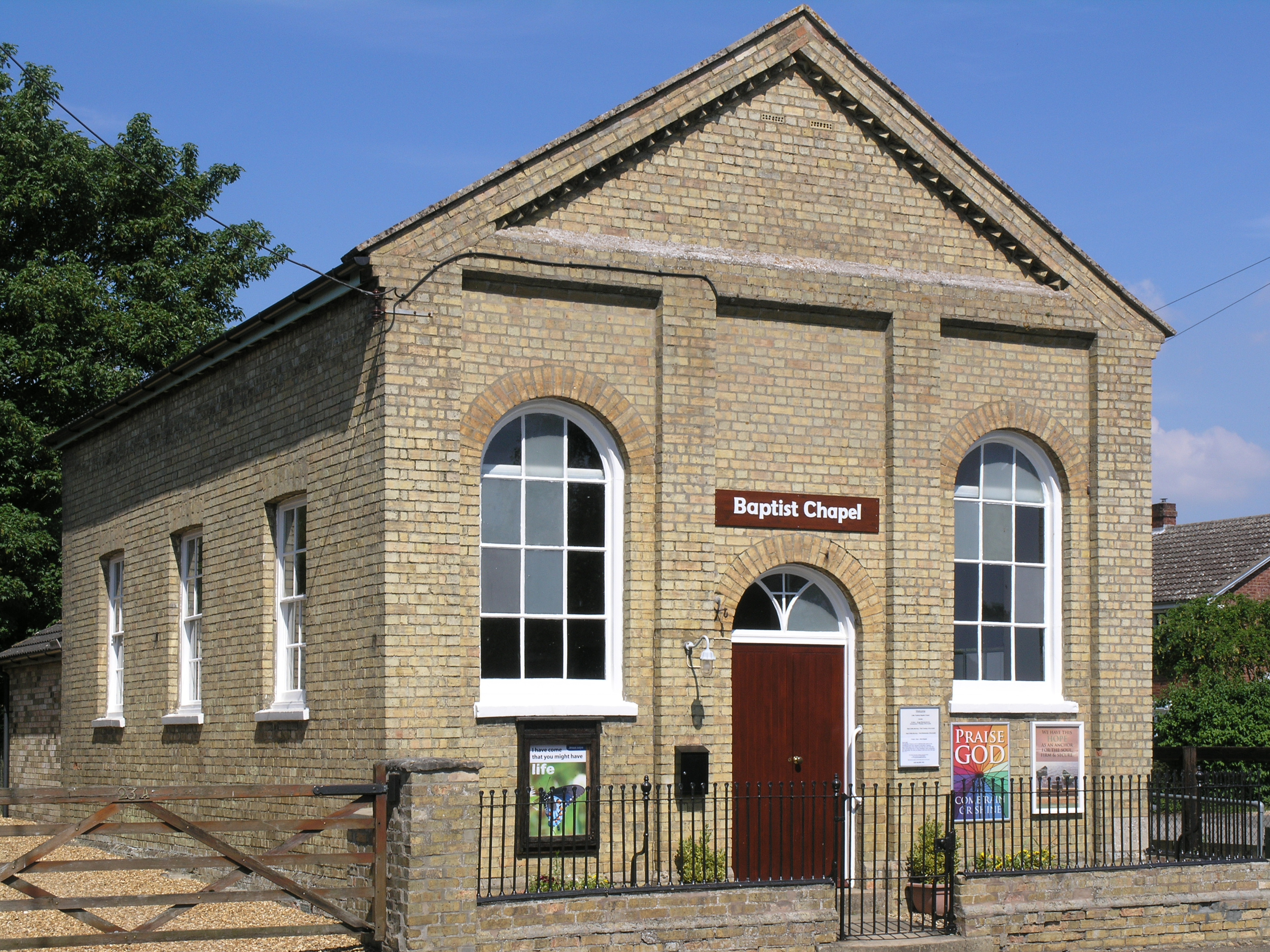
19th-century Baptist chapel

An inclosure act is a parliamentary authority to fence-off common land, thus making that land private property, while awarding commoners land in compensation. Inclosure is the name given to the parliamentary statute thus created. The enclosure process began in the 13th century and was supported by acts of Parliament from 1640. In November 1833, the Isle of Ely intended to apply for acts of Parliament to enclose the lands of Little Thetford. Officials arrived in the village armed with nothing more than a notice to be pinned on the Church of England's St. George's church door, but were prevented from doing so by a dozen villagers. They returned later with ten constables, authorised by Ely magistrates, and were confronted this time by 150 stick-wielding protesters, who continued to prevent due process. When the clergyman, Henry Hervey Baber, arrived the following afternoon, he was prevented from carrying out his normal Sunday service. Villagers may have rebelled against the church at this time, perhaps believing it was acting on behalf of the establishment in the enclosure acts. This event may have been the trigger that, five years later, encouraged a strong Baptist following amongst the poorer villagers. About half the total area of Little Thetford was eventually enclosed by the Thetford Inclosure and Drainage Act 1844 (7 & 8 Vict. c.xxix), seven years after that of Stretham by the Stretham Inclosure Act 1835 (5 & 6 Will. 4. c. 13 Pr.).

The village sent 61 men to fight in the First World War, which represented over 30 per cent of the village population of 1911. (Note: The vicar of Stretham and Little Thetford, Rev. S. Stewart Stitt, who lost his son in the war, recorded all those who took part in the war at the Church Annual Vestry Meeting in 1919.) Two villagers won Distinguished Conduct Medals. Thirteen villagers—over six per cent of the village—died at battles including La Cateau, Second Battle of Ypres, Gallipoli Campaign, Battle of the Somme, and the Battle of Arras. (Note: St. George's church 1914–1918 memorial inside the church)

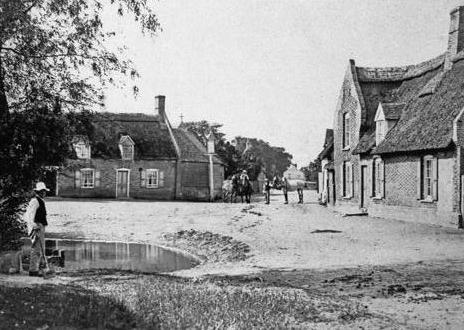
Little Thetford Main Street, 1906. Three Horse Shoes public house on left. Thatched building, c. 13th century, on right which burned down on 6 November 1930.

One of the thatched houses in Little Thetford was destroyed by fire. Reported in the Cambridge Chronicle 6 November 1930, the cause of the fire at the c. 13th-century six-room building was not known. Fireworks were being discharged at the other end of the village. All that remained were burnt beams and smouldering walls, which were apparently made of old fen-mud. The villagers saved the nearby Three Horseshoes public house, by forming a bucket chain, and pouring water on its thatched roof.

Two residents of the village were killed in action during the Second World War. (Note: St. George's church 1939–1945 memorial inside the church) One villager, serving with the 5th Battalion of the Suffolk Regiment, was captured during the Battle of Singapore, and died in captivity in Thailand. Another villager, serving on board HMS Warspite, was fatally wounded at Salerno during his ship's support of the Allied invasion of Italy.

The river floods that began in mid-March 1947 affected over 1,000 square miles (2,600 km^{2}) of England. Some parts of thirty out of the forty English counties were underwater for nearly two weeks, during the worst flooding for over 200 years. Before the flooding, snow had been falling continuously since 23 January, with drifts up to 23 feet (7.0 m) deep in places. The winter of 1946–1947 had been very severe, with mean average temperatures 4 °C (7 °F) below normal, for that time of year. As the thaw began in mid-March, the warmer weather brought heavy rains. The rain running off the frozen ground, combined with the thaw, overwhelmed multiple rivers in England and eastern Wales, which flooded. The River Great Ouse collapsed at Little Thetford on 17 March, flooding over 3 square miles (7.8 km^{2}) of nearby land. The army was drafted in to help repair the river banks, assisted by villagers, including women, and German prisoners.

Built in 1958, the village hall houses the village social club, which started in a small extension to the hall in 1973. The club was extended in 1981, as the membership had grown to over 400. Ely Member of Parliament, Clement Freud, opened the new room, built mainly by members themselves, on 7 May 1981.

== Governance ==
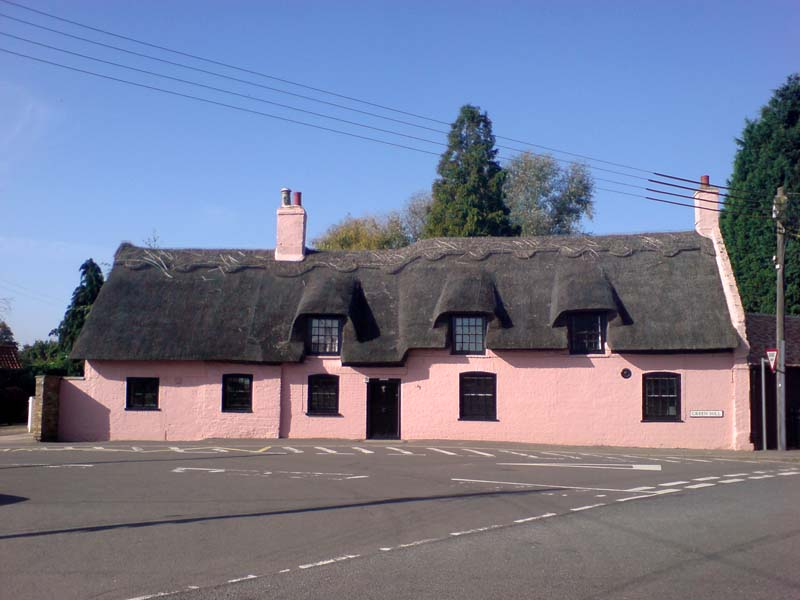
Horseshoes, 17th-century thatched cottage, formerly the Three Horse Shoes public house

In 1929, Stretham and Little Thetford were together one of the twelve parishes of the South Witchford Hundred, with a total area of 58 square miles (150 km^{2}). The village of Little Thetford is coterminous with the civil parish of Thetford. The civil parish today is in the ward of Stretham, which comprises three civil parishes, Stretham, Thetford, and Wilburton, each of which has an elected council. Thetford seems to be the preferred administrative name used for the village, but it is easily confused with Thetford in Norfolk. Parish council services include bus shelters, cemeteries, shared equity housing, local planning consultation, play areas, village halls, and war memorials. Parish council meetings are held in the village hall situated in each civil parish. Little Thetford is also an ecclesiastical parish, although the church no longer has the same administrative responsibilities as it had until the early 19th century. A civil parish need not cover the same area as an ecclesiastical parish, but in the case of Little Thetford, they do.

The civil parish councils were governed by Ely Rural District council from 1894 until 1974. East Cambridgeshire District Council (ECDC) was formed in 1974 with administration buildings in Ely. The district council collects council tax, provides services such as building regulations and local planning, leisure and tourism, handles issues strategic to the district, and many other services. ECDC is in turn governed by Cambridgeshire County Council which has administration buildings in Cambridge. The county council provides county-wide services such as major road infrastructure, fire and rescue, libraries and heritage, and strategic planning. A mobile library visits the village every fortnight.

The parish is represented in the House of Commons of the Parliament of the United Kingdom as part of South East Cambridgeshire. It elects one Member of Parliament (MP) by the first past the post system of election.

== Geography ==
=== Geology and topography ===
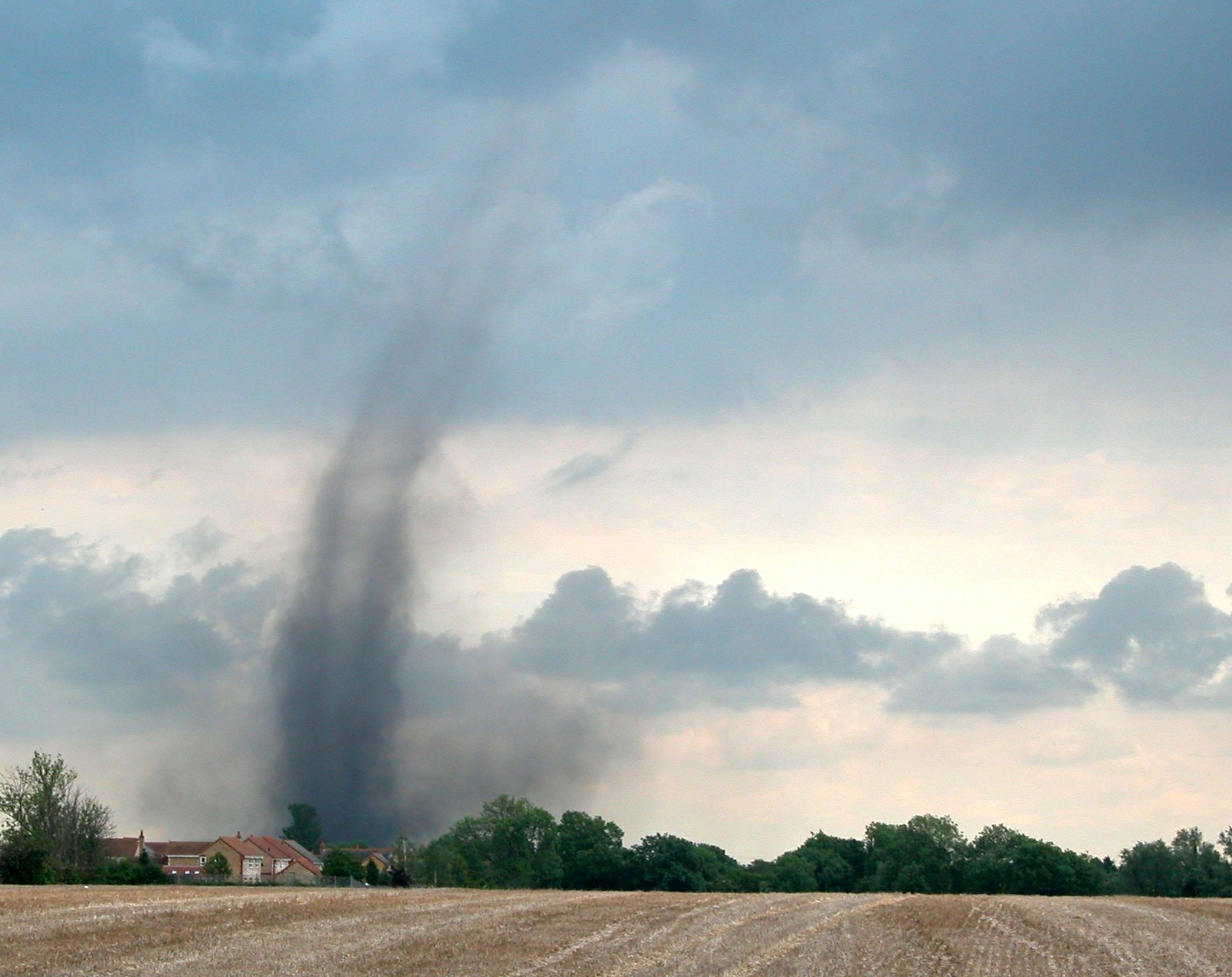
Tornado over the flat fenland countryside around Little Thetford

Map showing Isle of Ely surrounded by water (1648)

The village, which is at about 16 feet (5 m) above sea-level, sits largely on the Kimmeridge Clay, a Jurassic shallow-water shelf-sea deposit, with an overall south-south-east to south-east dip. Underlying the Kimmeridge Clay, are similarly dipping older Jurassic clays, which also contain thin beds of limestone and sandstone. Overlying the Kimmeridge Clay and lying some distance to the east of the village are similarly dipping, younger Cretaceous rocks, comprising the Greensand and Chalk. At the west of the village, an outlier of Greensand forms the foundation of a hill rising to some 30 feet (9 m) above sea-level. This hill is capped by much younger (Pleistocene) boulder clay, the result of large ice sheets having moved over the wider general area.

The Greensand also crops out to the south of the village. There it forms the eastern end of a similar outlier, on top of which is sited the village of Stretham. To the north-west of Little Thetford, a further outlier of Greensand, capped by boulder clay, occurs in the vicinity of Bedwell Hey Farm. Northwards, an even larger outlier of Greensand, partly capped by glacial deposits, forms a hill rising to 85 feet (26 m) above sea-level. This, the highest point locally, has allowed the development of the regionally important Saxon settlement of Ely, Cambridgeshire.

Even more geologically recent gravel, alluvium and fen deposits are found in the valley of the River Great Ouse at the eastern end of the village; they merge into the extensive flat tracts of The Fens which stretch north-north-west towards The Wash. Holme at nine feet (2.75 m) below sea-level is East Cambridgeshire's (and the United Kingdom's) lowest point, and is 22 miles (35 km) north-west.

=== Boundaries ===
The A10 road forms most of the western boundary. The fourth longest river in the United Kingdom, the River Great Ouse, forms most of the eastern boundary. The northern boundary of the village extends from the north of Bedwell Hey Farm then eastwards across the A10 road to the River Great Ouse. Braham Farm falls just outside the village boundary to the north. The southern boundary encloses the Stretham coprolite pits, between Hundred Acre and Holt Fen, thus putting the pits firmly within the Little Thetford boundary. The size of the parish has changed. It was two and a half square miles (1,600 acres; 6.5 km^{2}) in 1861; one point seven square miles (1,100 acres; 4.4 km^{2}) between 1891 and 1931; then changed to the present value of two square miles (1,300 acres; 5.2 km^{2}) from 1951 onwards.

=== Drainage and the Fens ===
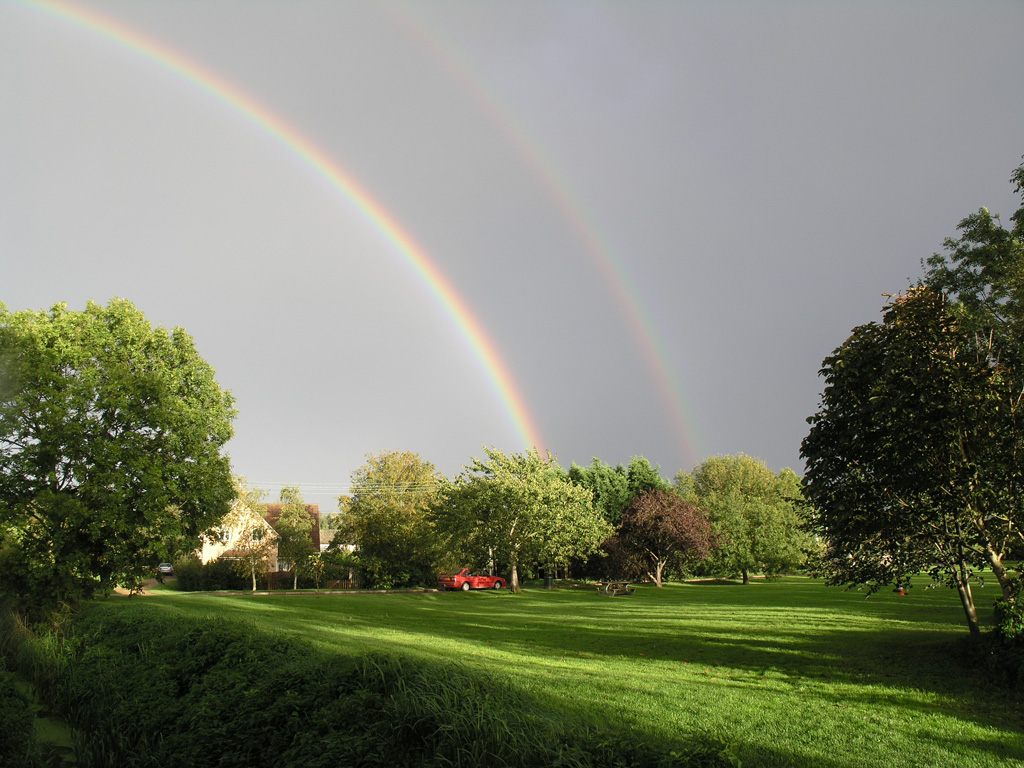
Village green with part of the Thetford catchwater drain on the left

There are many man-made waterways, or Lodes nearby, including Wicken Lode and Soham Lode. Researchers suggest the Fenland Lodes are Roman in origin—almost certainly Soham Lode. Other researchers disagree, presenting a case for such lodes being Anglo-Saxon or later. The Thetford catchwater (drain), constructed in 1838, runs south-west to north-east around the eastern edge of the built-up part of the village. It drains by gravity, into the River Great Ouse north-east of the village, at the Braham Dock drain.

The Earl of Bedford carried out extensive venture-capital led Fen draining schemes during the 17th century. The Fens continue to be drained to this day. Wicken Fen, one of Britain's oldest nature reserves, is two miles (3 km) south-east of the village. Little Thetford is in the Internal Drainage board of Littleport and Downham, which itself is part of the Ely Group of Internal Drainage Boards. Stretham and Prickwillow local museums preserve examples of steam-driven and diesel-driven pumping stations, respectively. The Little Thetford pumping station is just inside the eastern boundary of the village.

=== Climate ===
With an average annual rainfall of 24 inches (600 mm), Cambridgeshire is one of the driest counties in the British Isles. Protected from the cool onshore coastal breezes east of the region, Cambridgeshire is warm in summer and cold and frosty in winter. Regional weather forecasting and historical summaries are available from the UK Met Office. The nearest Met Office weather station is Cambridge NIAB. Additional local weather stations report periodic figures to the internet such as Weather Underground, Inc.

Climate data for Cambridge (1971–2000 averages)
Month	Jan	Feb	Mar	Apr	May	Jun	Jul	Aug	Sep	Oct	Nov	Dec	Year
Mean daily maximum °F (°C)	44.6 (7.0)	45.3 (7.4)	50.4 (10.2)	54.7 (12.6)	61.7 (16.5)	66.9 (19.4)	72.0 (22.2)	72.1 (22.3)	66.0 (18.9)	58.3 (14.6)	49.8 (9.9)	46.0 (7.8)	57.4 (14.1)
Mean daily minimum °F (°C)	34.3 (1.3)	34.0 (1.1)	37.2 (2.9)	39.2 (4.0)	44.1 (6.7)	49.6 (9.8)	53.6 (12.0)	53.4 (11.9)	50.2 (10.1)	44.8 (7.1)	38.7 (3.7)	36.1 (2.3)	43.0 (6.1)
Average rainfall inches (mm)	1.77 (45.0)	1.29 (32.7)	1.63 (41.5)	1.70 (43.1)	1.75 (44.5)	2.12 (53.8)	1.50 (38.2)	1.92 (48.8)	2.01 (51.0)	2.12 (53.8)	2.01 (51.1)	1.97 (50.0)	21.79 (553.5)
Source: Met Office

== Demography ==
Between 1881 and 1961, the village population density remained static at around 0.15/acre (37/km^{2}; 96/sq mi). In contrast, the England and Wales figures for the same period almost doubled, rising from around 0.75/acre (190/km^{2}; 480/sq mi) to around 1.2/acre (300/km^{2}; 770/sq mi). Little Thetford is in output area classification zones (CGM) six and seven. The area is classified as type three-C, accessible countryside. In this classification, most residents are remote workers in agriculture or fishing. The areas in this classification are less densely populated than other areas of the country. The usually detached households generally have two or more cars. Varied ethnic backgrounds are less likely in such areas.

Historical population of Little Thetford
Year	1801	1811	1821	1831	1841	1851	1861	1871	1881	1891	1901	1911
Population	119	147	229	257	250	366 (Note: Inflated due to local fair at time of census)	306	317	242	221	204	209
Year	1921	1931	1941	1951	1961	1971	1981	1991	2001	2011	2021	
Population	150	191	(Note: No census 1941 due to World War II)	263	283	290	389	446	693	792	744	
Census: 1801–2001 2011 2021

== Economy ==
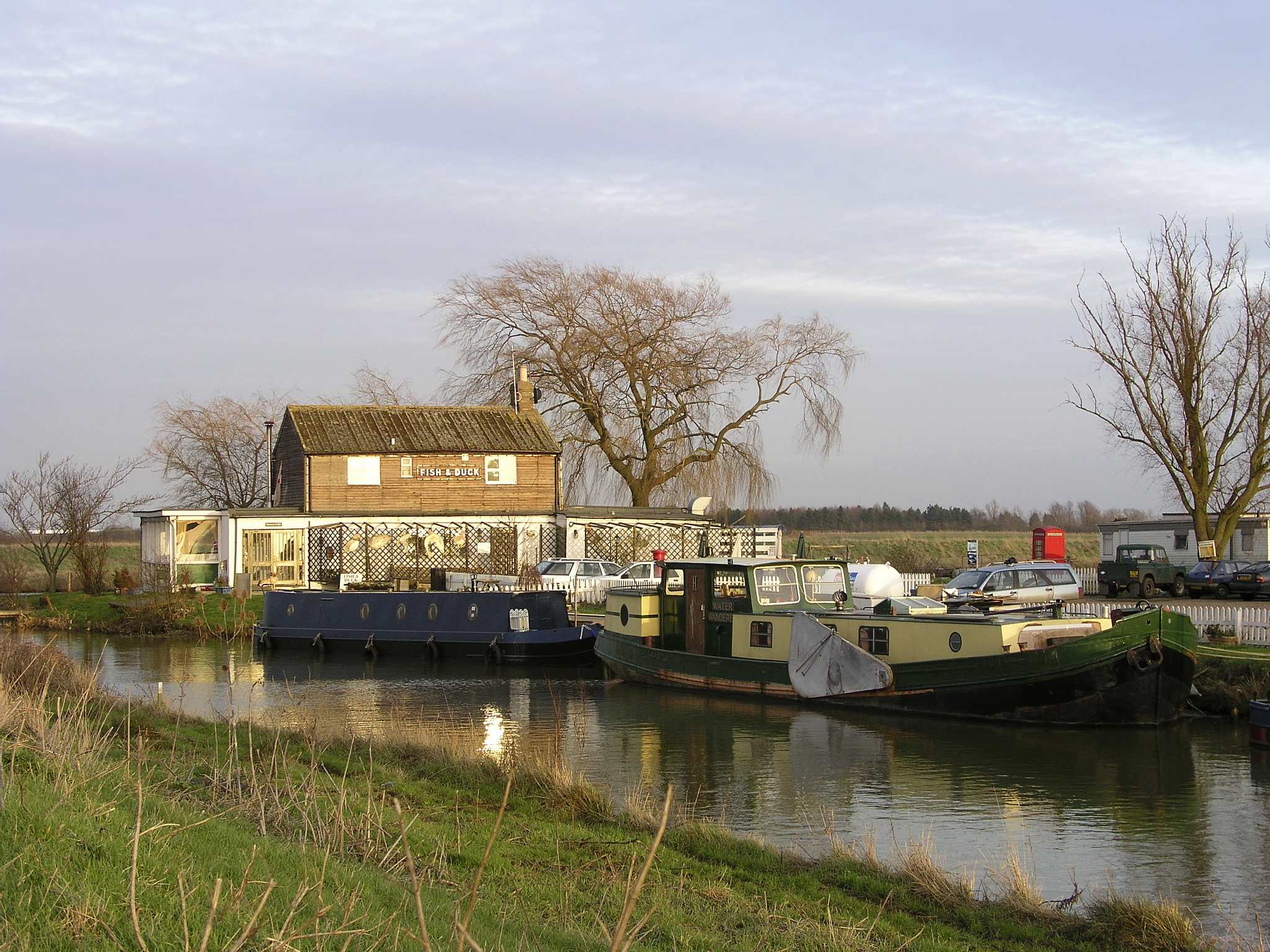
Fish and Duck public house on the River Great Ouse in Little Thetford

The marshes and meres surrounding the village supported fishing since Saxon times, at least until significant draining during the 17th century. Eels were plentiful in the waters in and around the Isle of Ely (Eel–ey). In 1086, Little Thetford was worth 3,250 eels to the nearby abbots. In one year, 1087, it was written that 52,000 eels were caught in and around the city. The islands in this landscape supported pastures; whilst reeds, peat, and rushes were harvested from the wetlands. As the land was drained, arable farming became the dominant activity, as it is today.

Little Thetford played a part in the coprolite mining rush of c. 1858–1900. Coprolites are phosphate-rich fossils found 2 and 10 feet (0.61 and 3.05 m) below the surface in 33 feet (10 m) deep by rarely more than 5 miles (8.0 km) wide Gault clay beds. When mixed with sulphuric acid, the coprolite forms a fertiliser. One author attributes the Stretham coprolite pit, in Little Thetford, as being owned by John Bailey Denton, 1814–1893, the surveyor and civil engineer. The site was worked from 1866. Mainly local labour was used in shovelling the coprolite from the pit, for washing and sorting. In 1871, six per cent of the population of Little Thetford worked at the pit. The coprolite was transported to the James Fison (now Fisons Ltd) factory in Thetford, Norfolk, by river and then onwards by railway.

The Three Horseshoes, now a residential property, was one of seven public houses known to be within the village boundaries since the mid-19th century. The British Beer and Pub Association estimated in 2001 that "six rural pubs close each week". There was a public house at Little Thetford, the Fish and Duck, situated along the river nearer Stretham; it closed in 2006, and the owning company dissolved on 11 May 2010. There is a combined newsagent, post office, and grocery store in Stretham, 2 miles (3 km) south of the village. The one remaining local store is the recumbent bicycle shop, D.Tek, on the main street.

The average distance the village population travels to work, by any means, is 13.6 miles (21.9 km). Most residents commute to Cambridge, although some villagers use the 75-minute Fen Line commuter service to London from Ely railway station, 2 miles (3.2 km) away. There is a train every 30 minutes during peak time.

== Community facilities ==
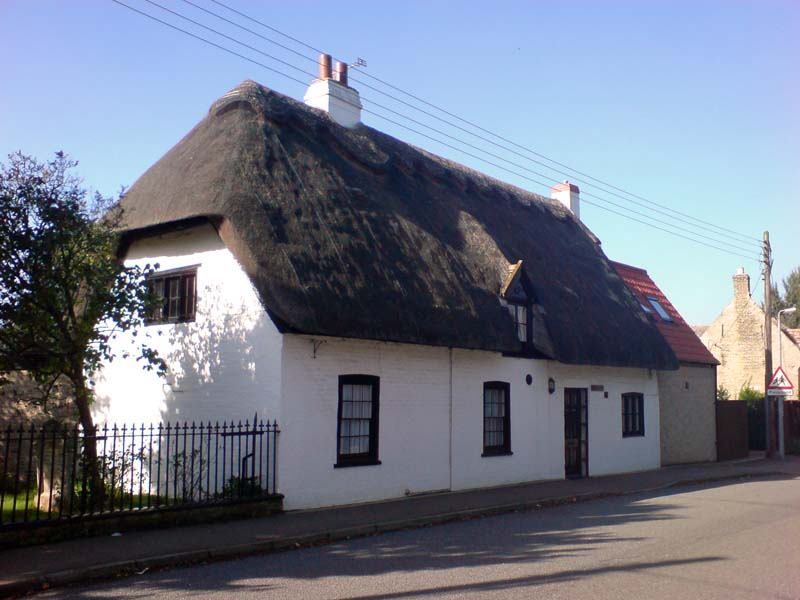
April Thatch cottage, 18th century

Sports and social activities including regular quiz-nights, netball, and cricket, are held in and around the village hall. (Note: Lt. Thetford Village Hall & Social Club notice board) The hall is a brick building erected in 1958. (Note: Plaque on front of building LITTLE THETFORD VILLAGE HALL 1958) The larger of the two village greens is used as a play area. A picnic bench shaded by large trees is available for passing walkers. The green has a full-sized basketball hoop at one end. Dog control orders are in force. In the Upware to Ely section of Judith Bambers Rough Guide to walks in London and the south-east, a 7-mile (11 km) walk is described which passes Little Thetford on the east bank of the River Great Ouse.

Saffron Walden Angling Club, formed in 1960, has a number of venues, including Little Thetford on the River Great Ouse. Fish species caught, along the weed and reed-lined river at Little Thetford, include roach, bream, rudd, perch and bleak. In addition, some tench to 6 pounds (3 kg) and rarely carp have been landed. A family run all-year-round grass camp site is in the village, offering 36 pitches for caravans or tents, with toilet facilities, showers, a laundry room, a vegetable preparation area, and washing-up facilities.

== Notable buildings ==
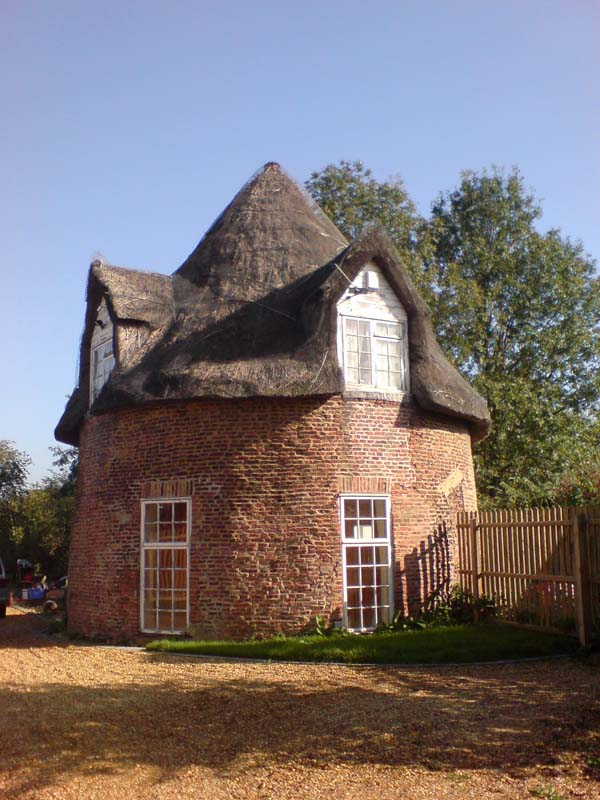
The Round House

St George's Church is a 14th-century stone building with slate roof. The roof was thatched until 1863, when the church was heavily restored. In 1886, it was struck by lightning and required extensive rebuilding. Today, the church consists of a chancel, nave, north porch, and south vestry. The octagonal bowl font still has an original lead lining. St. George's Church, a Grade II* listed building, is part of the Ely Team Ministry. The Baptist chapel was erected in 1867 on the site of its 1839 predecessor.

The history of the Round House in Main Street is disputed. It has been claimed that it is a late 15th-century dovecote. A Sun firemark insurance policy still exists, number 616606, dated July 1793, the earliest known written record of the house. Other sources suggest the Round House is an 18th-century thatched cottage, similar to the South African rondavel. A further source claims the building is a post-medieval, AD 1540–1900, tower mill. A family of 13 children lived in the building during the 19th century. (Note: Local history display inside St. George's Church) The now private dwelling was re-thatched in 2009.

The Horseshoes is a Grade II listed residential thatched cottage, which was originally the Three Horseshoes public house, a 17th-century pink-painted cottage built to follow the curve of the road. April Thatch is a former public house, now a Grade II listed residential property. This white-painted early 18th-century cottage used to be the Rose & Crown.

== Transport ==
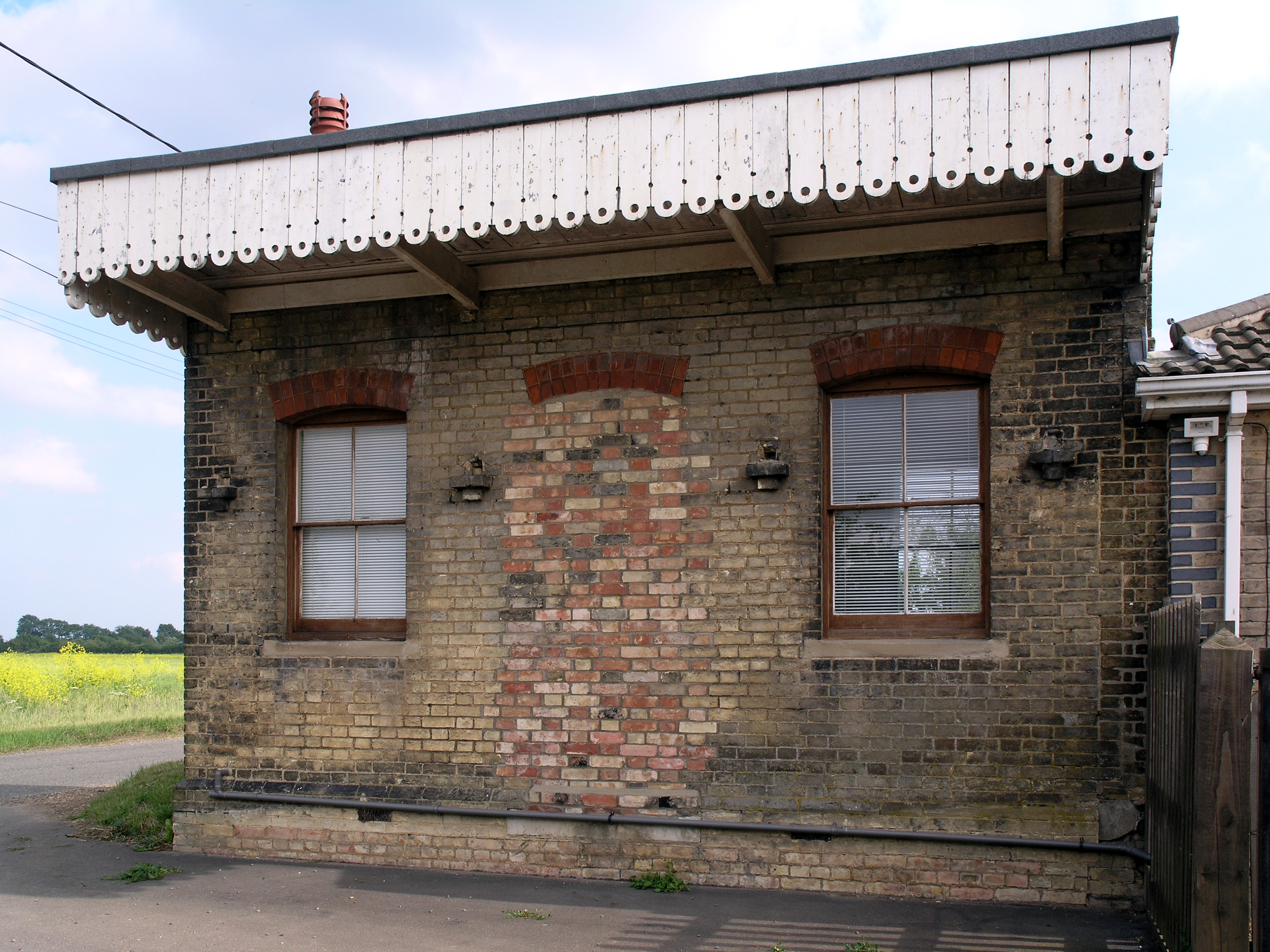
Stretham disused railway station near Little Thetford

A half-mile (1 km) section of the Roman road Akeman Street is shown on the 1903 Ordnance Survey map, three-quarters of a mile (1.2 km) due west of the village. This straight north-north-east section originates in Stretham and heads towards Ely. John Cary, the 18th-century cartographer, documents a coach route from London to King's Lynn passing by the village in his Cary's New Itinerary Road vehicle access to the village is now from the A10 road at Thetford Corner. Stagecoach operate the X9 bus service, Cambridge to March via Ely. This service stops near The Wyches, Thetford Corner. The village is a cul-de-sac to road vehicles, with no possible passage except in and out. It is a five-minute walk to the River Great Ouse from the eastern end of Holt Fen.

The former Ely and St Ives Railway, known locally as the Grunty Fen express, crossed the A10 road at Thetford Corner. Passenger service ceased in February 1931; the line was never popular because of the high cost of travel. In 1866, a year after the Ely–Sutton section opened, for example, the 7 1/2 miles (12.1 km) return journey from Ely to Sutton cost 2s 0d. That equates to a cost of almost £10 at present worth, as of 2025. The line completely closed in 1964. The nearest station was Stretham railway station, situated on nearby Grunty Fen. The Fen Line, Cambridge to Ely railway is close to the River Great Ouse as they both pass the village. Little Thetford "presents a picturesque appearance from the railway. The main line running close to its eastern end". The nearest station is at Ely, 2 miles (3.2 km) north-east of the village, about one hour 15 minutes away from London by rail.

The village can also be accessed by boat. The River Great Ouse passes to the east, forming much of the village's eastern boundary, and there are mooring bollards inside the village boundary. A privately owned 1945 de Havilland Dragon Rapide, based at the Shuttleworth Trust's Old Warden airfield, passes over the village during sightseeing tours to Ely. A privately maintained light aircraft airfield is located at Bedwell Hey Farm in the village.

== Education ==
Little Thetford School is a Church of England primary school. In 1870, there was a school in the village using run-down premises lent by Townsend's Feoffee, now the John Townsend charity. Following local subscriptions and charitable donations, a 75-place school, designed by J. P. St. Aubyn, was erected in 1872. This late Victorian building now provides education to around 100 pupils. The school was ranked joint-top in all of Cambridgeshire by aggregate-scores in all three key-stage 2 test subjects in 2009. The secondary education school, City of Ely Community College, is 5 miles (8 km) from the village. The independent school King's Ely, established c. 970, is also in Ely. King's provides education to pupils of nursery age through to international study.

== Public services ==
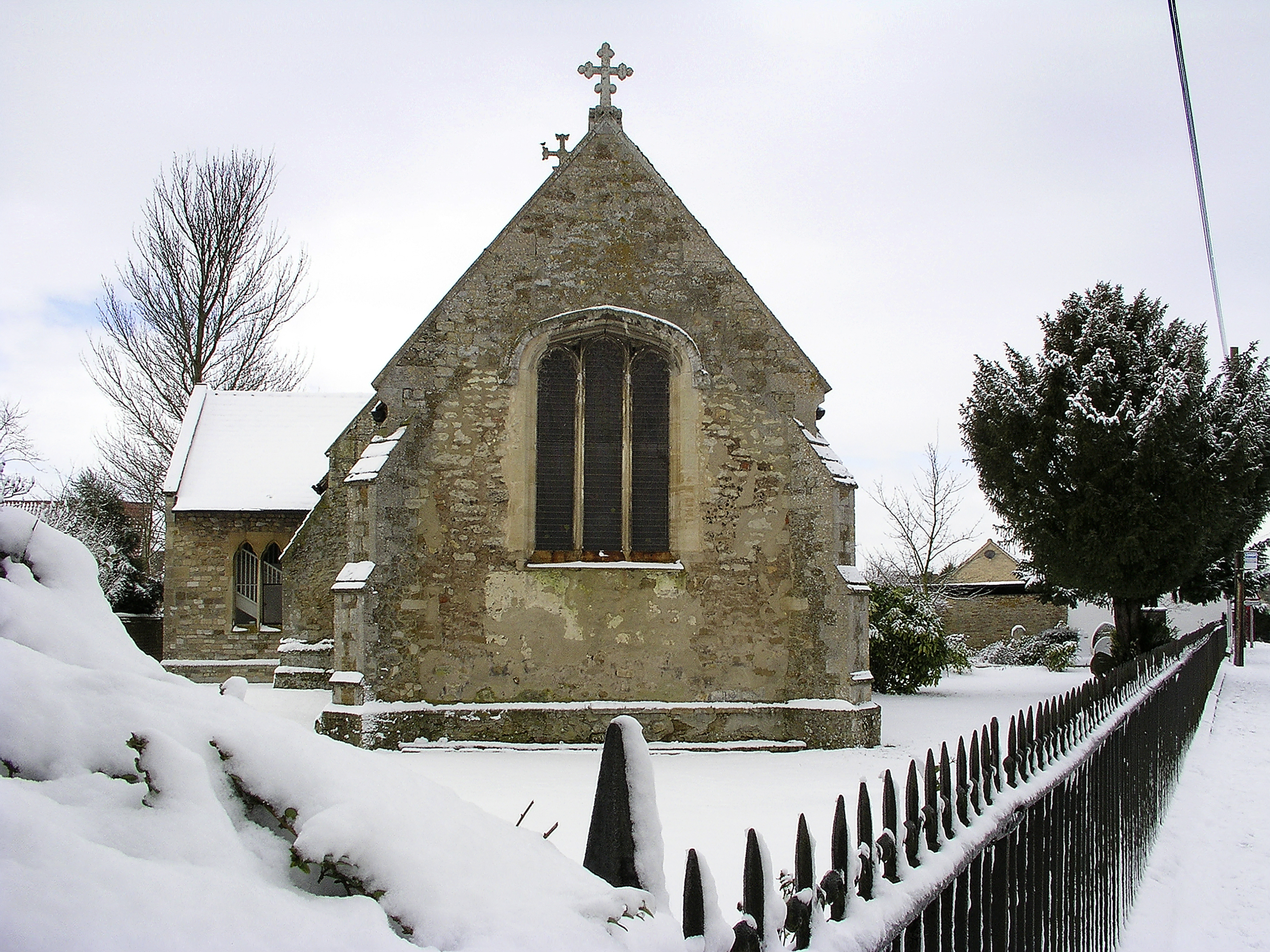
St George's church, 14th century

Anglian Water supplies the village water and sewage services from their Ely Public Water Supply zone FE33. The water quality was reported as excellent in 2009. In the same report, the hardness was reported as 304 mg/L. This is in the hard range of the scale which is more than moderately hard and less than very hard. The nearest reservoir, Grafham Water, is 24 miles (39 km) due west of the village.

The distribution network operator for electricity is EDF Energy. The largest straw-burning power station in the world is at nearby Sutton. This renewable energy resource power station rated at 36.85 MW from burning biomass, nearly 25 per cent of the total renewable energy reported for Cambridgeshire in 2009. The world's largest poultry litter power plant, 38.5 MW, at Thetford, refers to the other Thetford in Norfolk.

East Cambridgeshire District Council is part of the Recycling in Cambridgeshire and Peterborough (RECAP) Partnership, which was granted Beacon status for waste and recycling in 2006–2007.

National health services (NHS) for the village are administered by NHS East of England. Acute cases are handled by four hospitals, including Addenbrooke's Hospital and Royal Papworth Hospital‘s, both 16 miles (26 km) south of the village. The nearest doctor's surgery is Haddenham Surgery, Stretham, 2 miles (3 km) south of the village. This is a satellite surgery for the main surgery in Haddenham, Cambridgeshire, 5 miles (8 km) west of the village.

== Development ==
In March 2021, a community land trust was formed. Following a call for land on 18 March 2021, the trust completed the selection process during July 2021 for the development of 70+ new homes. Villagers have voiced a number of objections, such as the in-camera land selection process, and apparent undeclared conflicts of interest amongst the trustees.

== See also ==
- List of places in Cambridgeshire
- History of Cambridgeshire
