= William Sole =

British botanist

- Born: 1739; Witchford, Cambridgeshire
- Died: 7 February 1802 (aged 62–63); Bath, Somersetshire
- Burial place: St John the Baptist Church, Batheaston, Somersetshire
- Education: King's Ely
- Occupations: Apothecary, botanist

William Sole (1739 – 7 February 1802) was a British apothecary and botanist.

The Oxford Dictionary of National Biography states that William Sole was born in 1741 in Little Thetford, Cambridgeshire, However, evidence suggest that he was born in 1739 and Baptised on 28 September in Witchford, Cambridgeshire.

William Sole was the first son of John and Martha Sole. Sometime after his birth, the family moved to Little Thetford. John and Martha had a further six children. John (bapt. 14 June 1741), Sarah (bapt. 15 May 1743), Elizabeth (bapt. 24 February 1744), Francis (bapt. 19 February 1748), Robert (bapt. 13 May 1750), Martha (bapt. 3 October 1752). In his will dated 15 March 1802, Sole mentions all of his siblings, with the exception of Elizabeth.

Sole studied at King's Ely, then served an apprenticeship as an apothecary in Cambridge. On qualifying, he moved to Bath, where he practised is profession from premises in Trim Street with partner Thomas West. During their partnership, Sole and West brought at least five apprentices into their business. This partnership ended in 1895 and Sole continued to work alone until his death in 1802.

It is Sole's botanical research that he is most noted for. He specialised in the study of mints, in his garden and by the specimens he collected from a number of places in the United Kingdom. In 1798, he published Menthae Britannicae, and this was the publication that he became most known for. He also researched grasses and the local flora of Bath, and was elected as one of the first associates of the Linnean Society.

Sprengel named the genus Solea for Sole, although this was later merged into Hybanthus, or into Pombalia, in recent studies.

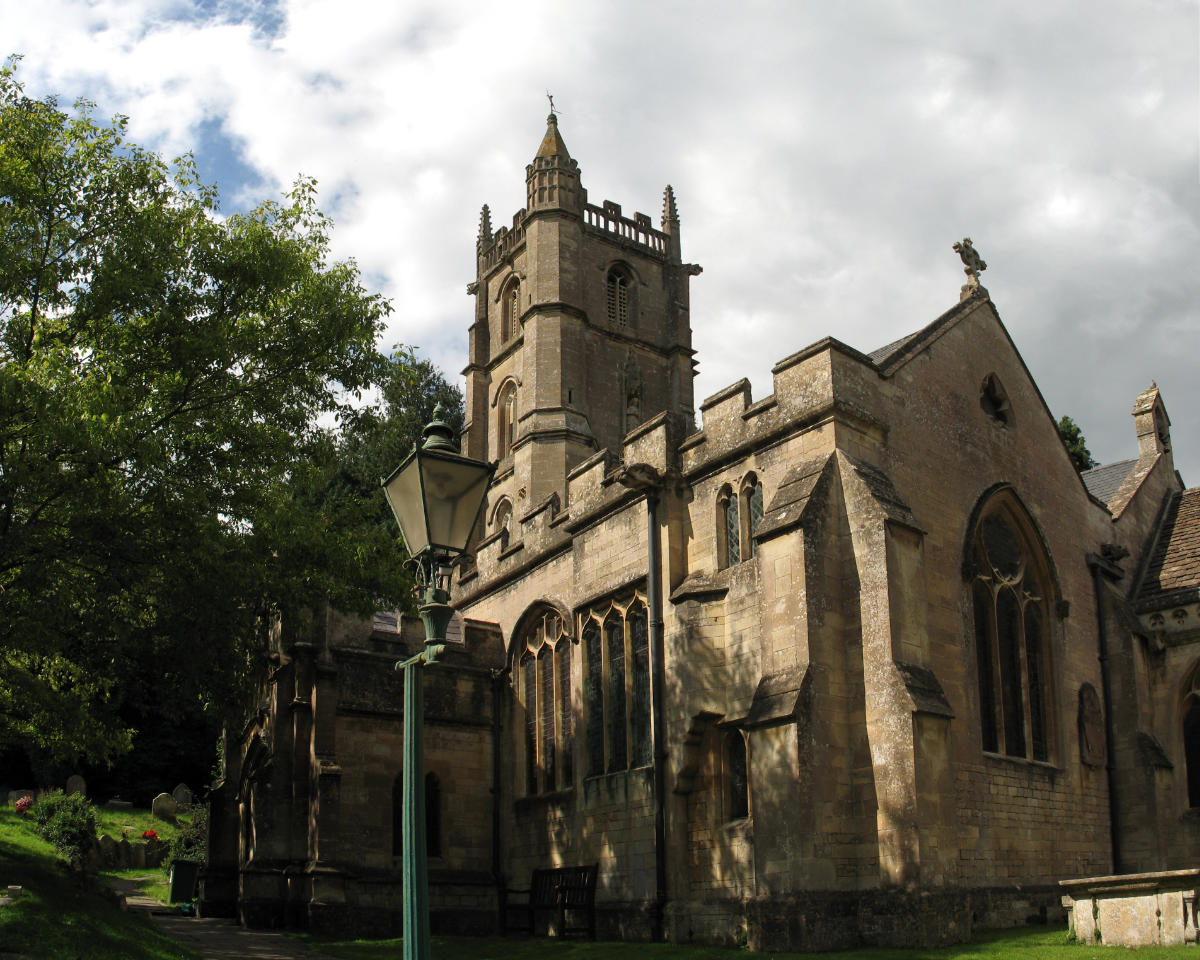
St John the Baptist Church, Batheaston

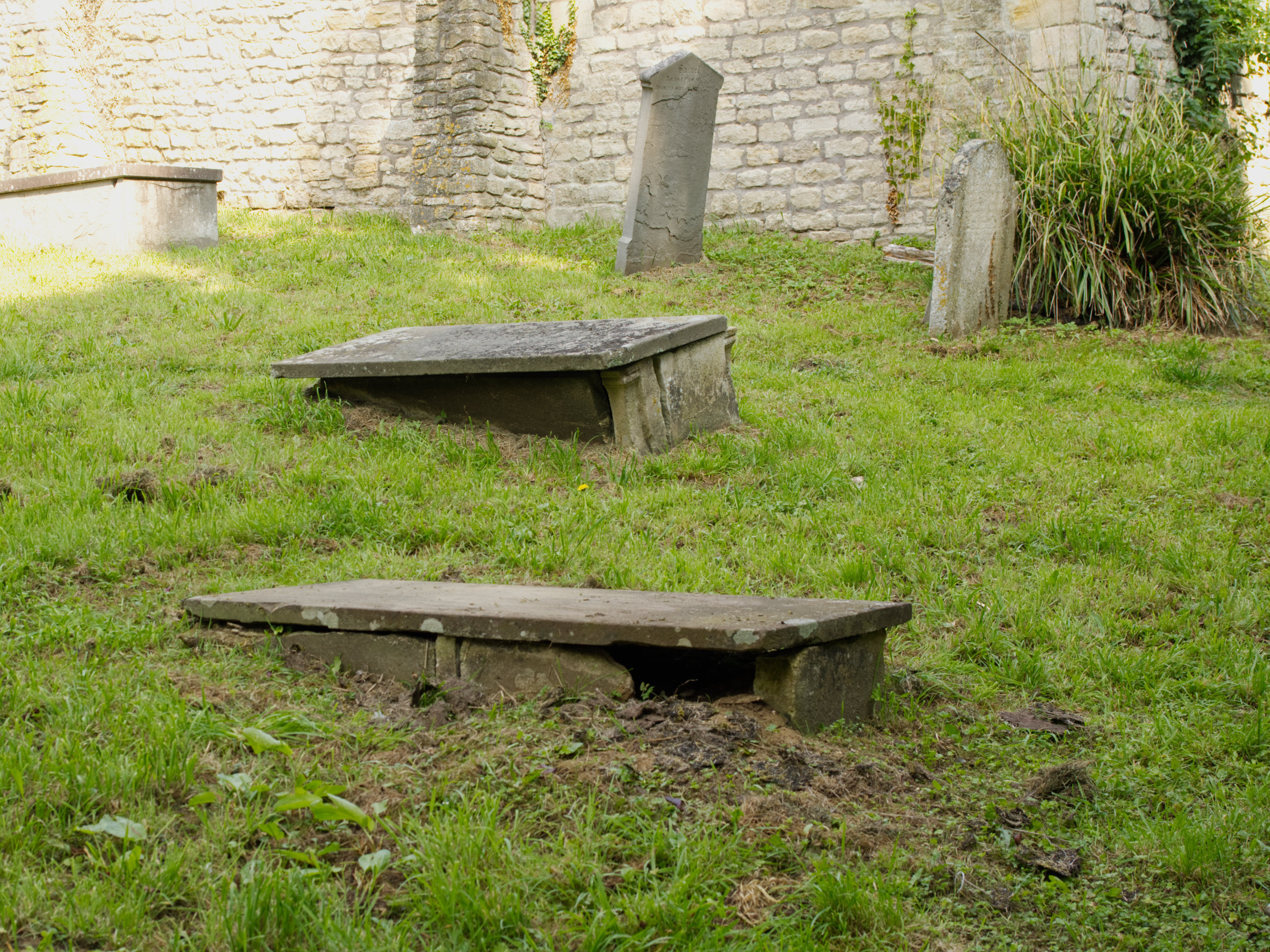
William Sole's grave in St John the Baptist churchyard, Batheaston

William Sole made his will shortly before his death on 15 January 1802 and left his estate to his siblings living in Cambridgeshire. There is no evidence that he married. He died on 7 February 1802, aged 62, and was buried at Church of St John The Baptist, Batheaston. His gravestone may be found towards the top of the churchyard.

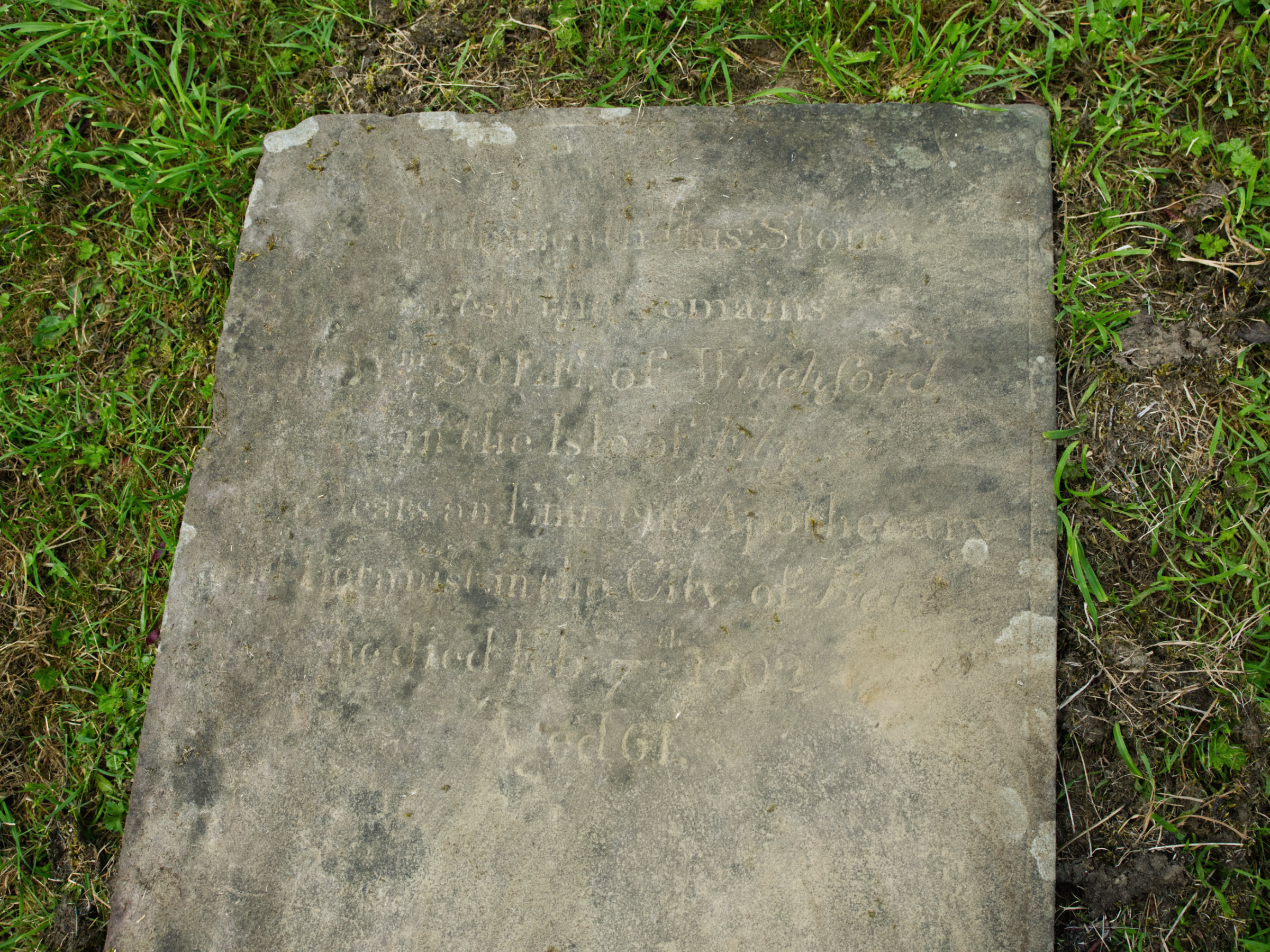
Epitaph on William Sole's grave: "Underneath this Stone lies the remains of W^{m} SOLE of Witchford in the Isle of Ely many Years an Eminent Apothecary and Botanist in the City of Bath who died Feb 7th 1802 Aged 61"

Known publications and papers
Title	Notes
Sole, W., 1782. Flora Bathonica	A lost manuscript, Flora Bathonica, or Flora of Somerset, said to date from 1782, but is said to have been known by 19th Century botanists.
Sole, W., 1798. Menthae Britannicae: being a new botanical arrangement of all the British mints hitherto discovered	The book included 24 full-plate etchings, all executed by William Hibbert from artwork by several artists.
Sole, W., 1799. On the principal English grasses	To be found in vol. 9 of Letters and papers on agriculture, planting, &c ... A journal published by the Royal Bath & West of England Society (as it is now known). This article included pull out illustrations, engraved by Hibbert, of twelve samples collected by Sole.
Sole, W., n.d. An account of the principal English grasses, with descriptions of their respective excellencies and defects in regard to agricultural uses ... with accurate drawings of each species of grass.	Also known by the short title of ‘Sole’s Book of Grasses’ this is a folio of hand painted illustrations said to have been donated to the Bath & West of England Society by William Sole. It is held in the Bath & West Library Collection at the University of Bath Library.
Bath Philosophical Society papers	Sole also contributed papers to the Bath Philosophical Society, though these papers are lost

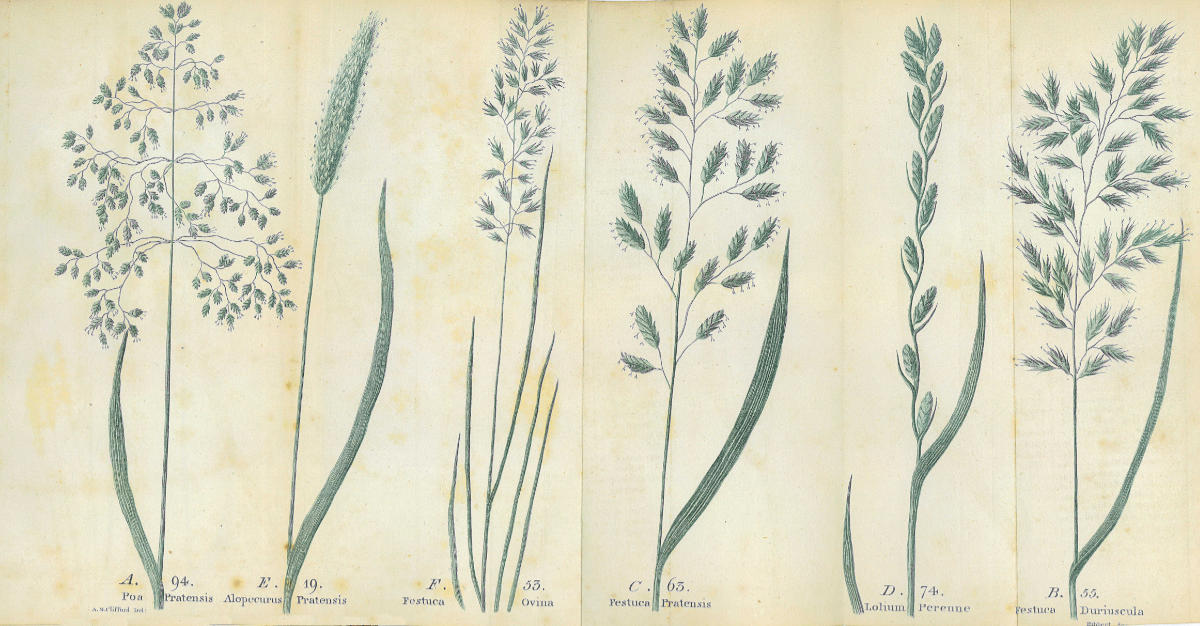
Example from Sole's 1799 article on English grasses.

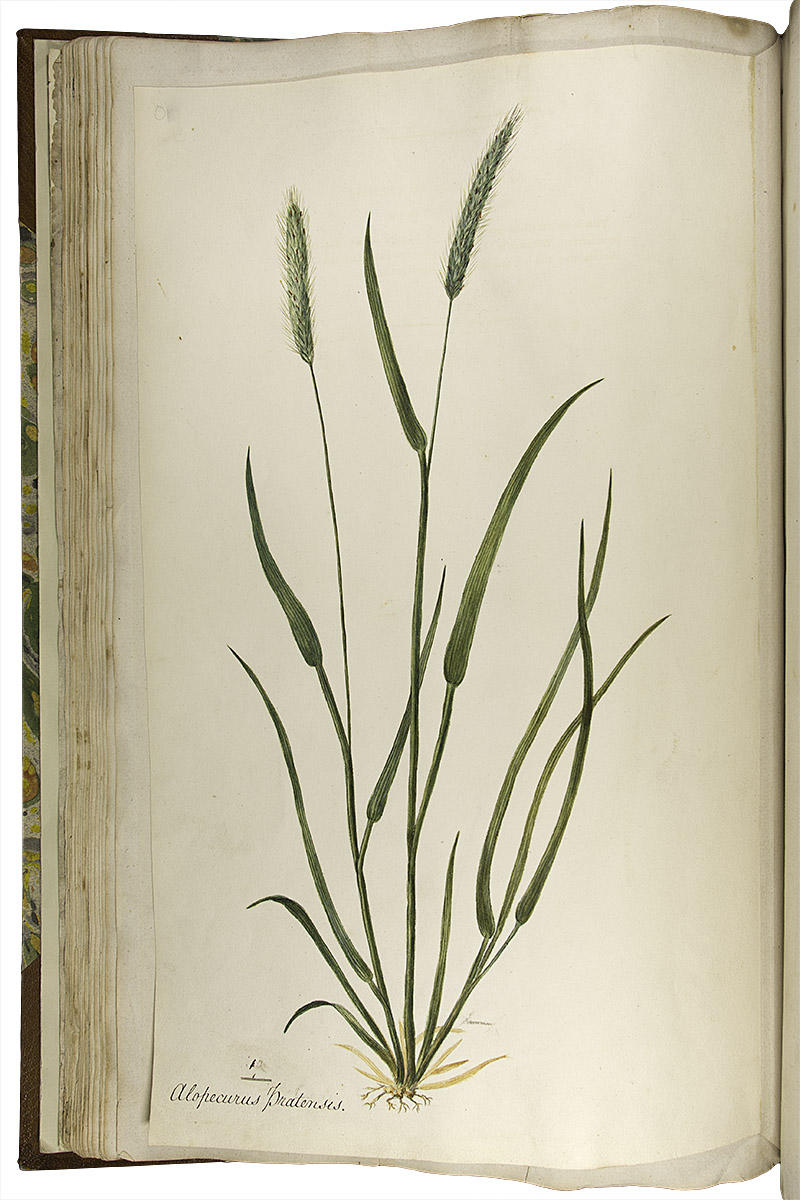
Meadow foxtail grass. Artist unknown. lllustration created for William Sole's book of grasses
