= Cratendune =

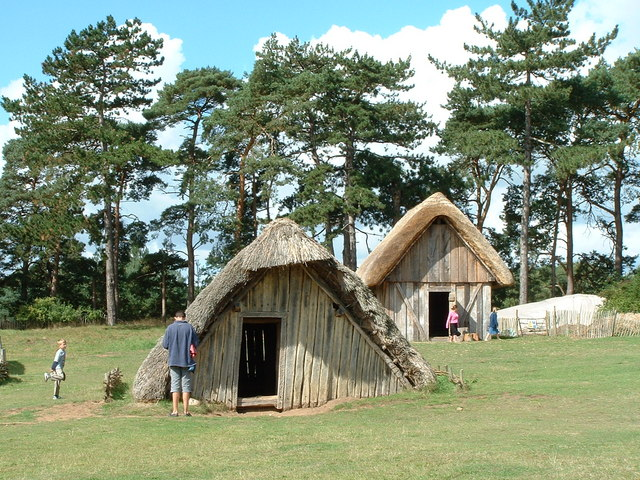
- Reconstruction of an Anglo-Saxon village in West Stow
- District: East Cambridgeshire
- Shire county: Cambridgeshire
- Region: East
- Country: England
- Sovereign state: United Kingdom

Cratendune (Medieval Latin: vallis Cracti) is the name of the lost village reported in the Liber Eliensis, the history of the abbey, then Ely Cathedral, compiled towards the end of the 12th century, as the 500th anniversary of the traditional founding date drew near. As no direction is indicated in Liber Eliensis, a number of archaeological sites are therefore candidates for this lost village.

== History ==
Reading from the Liber Eliensis MS folio 2, which is a 12th century Benedictine history of Ely written in Latin, Bentham describes Æthelberht of Kent, Chief of the Saxon Kings, founding a church at the insistence of Augustine (died 26 May 604). The church, dedicated to the Virgin Mary, was located about 1.6 kilometres (1 mi) (Note: Bentham (1771) p. 11 says about a mile distant from the present city) from what is now Ely Cathedral at a place called Cratendune. The date mentioned for this founding was the year 607, (Note: The date is given in Chronicon Abbatum et Episcoporum Eliensum, which depends in part on Liber Eliensis and shares the same source material. However, the date is not consistent with the death of Augustine of Canterbury in 604) three years after Augustine's death. This incongruity was attributed by Bentham to a mistake by the monk transcribing this history.

Fairweather, translating the same Latin text, records the site 1.6 kilometres (1 mi) from the present site of the Cathedral:

In times of old, so it is said, there was a vill, that is, in Latin, Vallis Cracti (Note: Here the translator Janet Fairweather inserts 'the down of Cactus') a mile away from the city which now exists. There one frequently finds implements of iron-work and the coinage of past kings, and the fact that it was for a long time a place inhabited by men is clear from various pieces of evidence. But after Æthelthryth, beloved of God, chose to dwell there, ...she sited her living-quarters near the course of the river, on higher ground

Staffed by Benedictine monks, the church was abandoned, perhaps destroyed in around 650 by or on the orders of the pagan Penda of Mercia.

No direction is indicated in Liber Eliensis; a number of archaeological sites, therefore, are candidates for this lost village. Two candidate locations are based on the survival of the toponym Cratenden. One, Cratendon Field, was identified as the lost site by the antiquarian James Bentham just south of the city of Ely, and the identification was repeated by James Sargant Storer, in The Antiquarian Itinerary, 1816. Janet Fairweather notes that in the Ely Coucher book Cratendune Field is listed next to Grunty Fen, corroborating this identification. Cratendune also survived as a toponym associated with Chettisham in a 1251 survey.

== Geography ==
As there is no documented direction for Cratendune, the place could be anywhere. These modern places are all within 4 kilometres (2 mi) of the present day site of Ely cathedral. The cathedral is built on boulder clay resting on a Jurassic Kimmeridge Clay bed; the old course of the River Great Ouse is 2 kilometres (1 mi) south-east. The highest point in the area at 26 metres (85 ft) is 0.8 kilometres (0.5 mi) south-west towards Witchford aerodrome, now disused. At Witchford, 3 kilometres (2 mi) south-west, Fowler found an Anglo-Saxon cemetery: see below.

== Archaeology ==
The search for Cratendune continues, though evidence that any one site is the lost village remains sparse. In 1999 there was media attention during preparation work for new buildings at West Fen Road, Ely. The archaeology work subsequently undertaken indeed shows Romano-British and Anglo-Saxon occupation. However, it was shown that the site was still active in the 13th century and there were no signs of an earlier Anglo-Saxon settlement here. This makes the West Fen Road site an unlikely Cratendune location.

During World War II whilst constructing an aerodrome at Witchford, near Little Thetford, a cemetery was discovered. Major Gordon Fowler reports witnessing a bulldozer leveling off ground and in so doing was crushing skeletons. The urgent war effort could not be stopped so little archaeological work could be undertaken. He was, however, able to recover some objects from the graves, which were later dated by Lethbridge to be consistent with the period AD 450–650. Recent survey work has not repeated the 1943 report of an Anglo-Saxon cemetery here, instead of finding Iron-Age and Roman period domestic and other remains. It has been suggested that an Anglo-Saxon settlement within Ely was perhaps more spread out, with no single core settlement.

== See also ==
- Anglo-Saxon England
- Anglo-Saxon settlement of Britain
