= Doghouse Grove =

Nature reserve in Cambridgeshire, England

Coordinates: 52.349°N 0.172°E

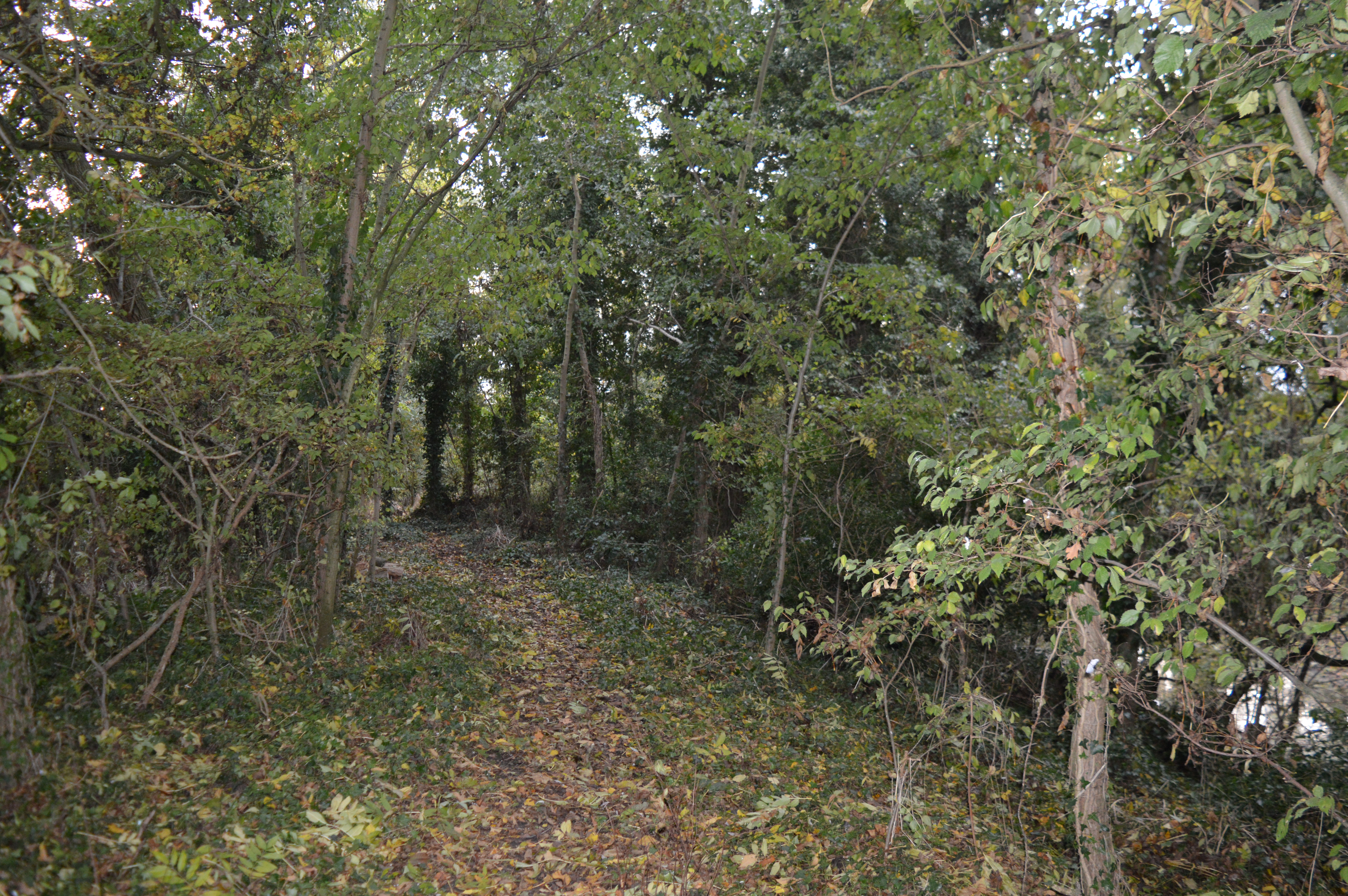
- Interactive map of Doghouse Grove
- Type: Nature reserve
- Location: Wilburton, Cambridgeshire
- OS grid: TL 480 745
- Area: 0.8 hectares (2.0 acres)
- Manager: Wildlife Trust for Bedfordshire, Cambridgeshire and Northamptonshire

Doghouse Grove is a 0.8-hectare (2.0-acre) nature reserve in Wilburton in Cambridgeshire. It is managed by the Wildlife Trust for Bedfordshire, Cambridgeshire and Northamptonshire.

In the medieval period this was a series of monastic fishponds, which can still be seen in wetter periods. It is now an ash wood, with flowers including bluebells and lords-and-ladies.

There is access by a permissive footpath from Twenty Pence Road.
