= St George's Church, Little Thetford =

Coordinates: 52.363°N 0.248°E

St George's
- St George's Church, Little Thetford
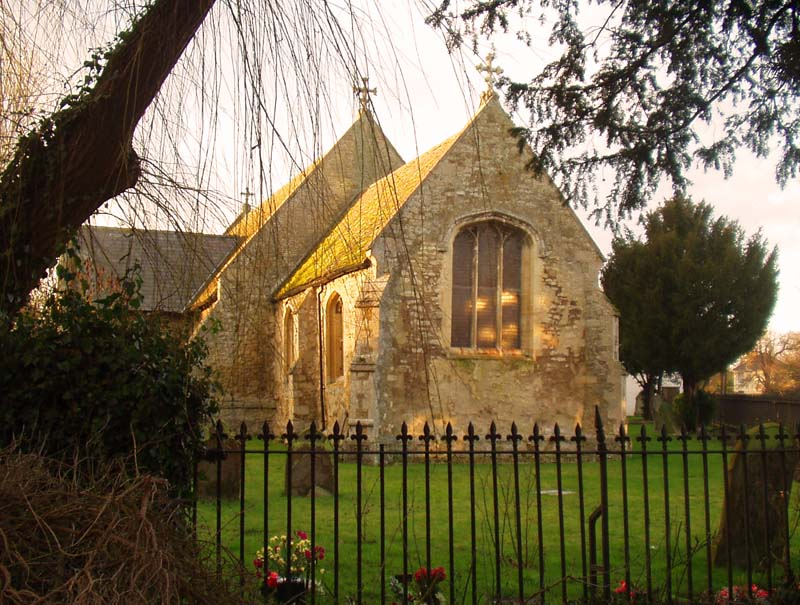
- East gable of the chancel

- Location in Cambridgeshire
- Location: Little Thetford, Cambridgeshire
- Country: England
- Denomination: Church of England
- Website: Little Thetford, St George

History
- Founded: c. 14th century
- Dedication: Saint George
- Events: Major restoration 1863

Architecture
- Functional status: Active
- Heritage designation: Grade II*
- Designated: 5 February 1952
- Architectural type: Church
- Style: Gothic
- Completed: 1867

Specifications
- Capacity: 140
- Length: 19.5 metres (64 ft)
- Width: 4 metres (13 ft)
- Materials: Fieldstone & limestone rubble & dressed limestone with plain tiled roof having end parapets

Administration
- Province: Province of Canterbury
- Diocese: Diocese of Ely
- Parish: Little Thetford with Stretham

Clergy
- Bishop: Bishop of Ely
- Vicar: Rev. Chris Hill

St George's Church, Little Thetford, is an Anglican church in the village of Little Thetford, Cambridgeshire, England.

== History ==
St. George's Church is a 14th-century stone building with slate roof. In 1751 it was recorded as a chapel of ease attached to Stretham served by the rector there. The roof was thatched until 1863, when the church was heavily restored. In 1886, it was struck by lightning and required extensive rebuilding. Today, the church consists of a chancel, nave, north porch, and south vestry. The 14th-century octagonal bowl font still has an original lead lining. St. George's Church, a Grade II* listed building, is part of the Ely Team Ministry. The complete registers start in 1654 and are kept at the Cambridge Records Office.

== Architecture ==
=== Exterior ===
The previously thatched roof has been plain tiles since the extensive restorations of 1863. The east gable of the nave, rebuilt in 1665, is of narrow local brick. The 19th-century west gable end has a gabled double bellcote with two-centred arches and one bell installed. The 19th-century west window has three trefoil lights. The North and South walls of the nave have, in each wall, one window of three cinquefoil lights in ogee arches and square head. The clunch tracery and the mullion and architrave are of limestone, which may indicate they are part of an earlier restoration. The gabled, brick and rubblestone north porch is 19th century. The chancel has in the north wall two windows, each of two cinquefoil lights in four centred arch. The restored east window has three cinquefoil lights and has an original label with mask stops. The windows in the south wall were restored c. 1980.

=== Interior ===
In a survey recorded in 1751, two bells were noted in the west end and the nave and chancel were thatched. The present single bell, marked "chapel of Ely house, London", is dated 1769. The 19th-century roof is of collar rafter type. The two centred chancel arch, 19th century, have two moulded orders, the inner on engaged colonnettes. The 1980 vestry conversion included toilet, refreshment facilities and improved access for the disabled.

Inside St George's

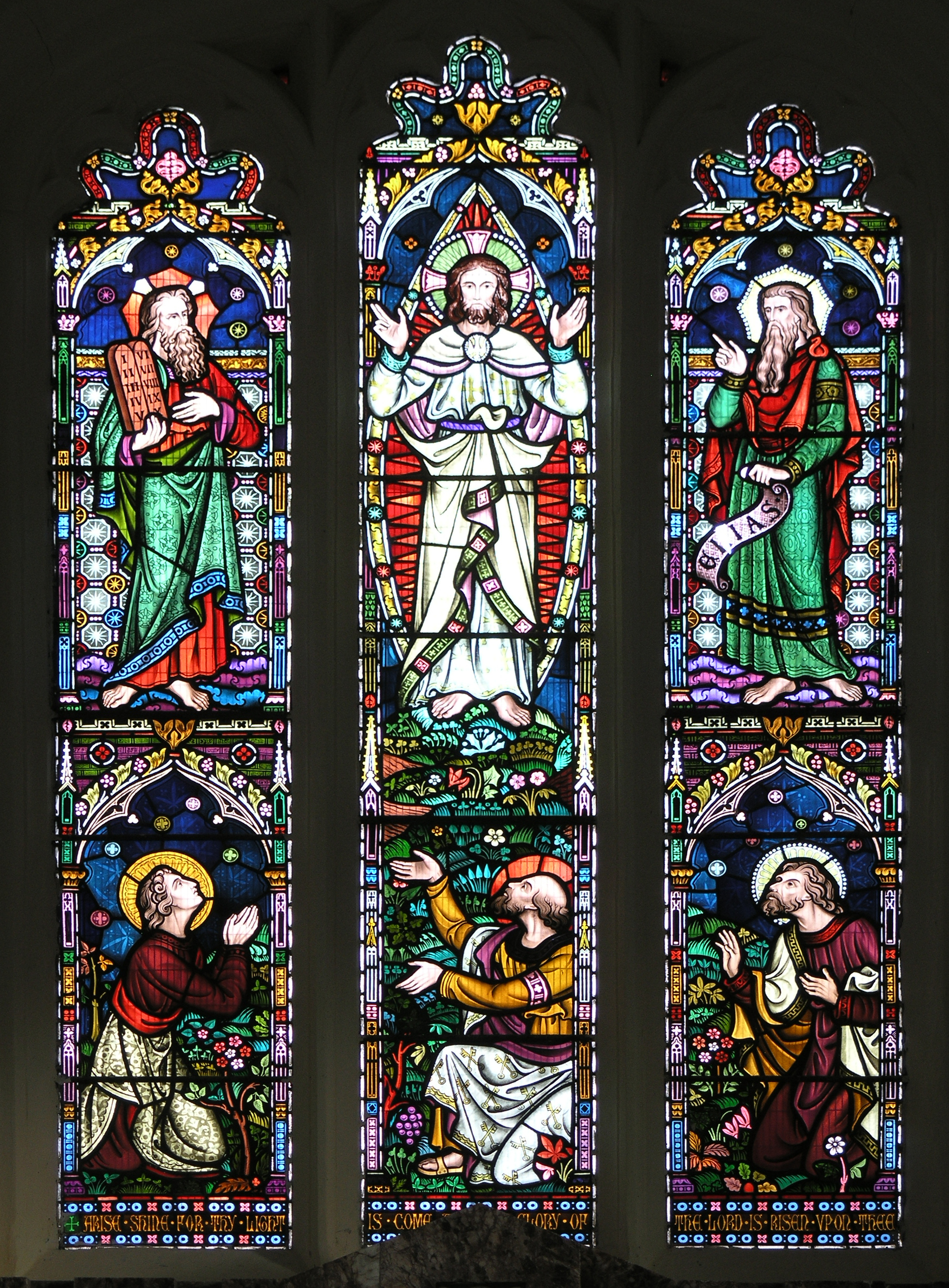
Chancel east three-light window

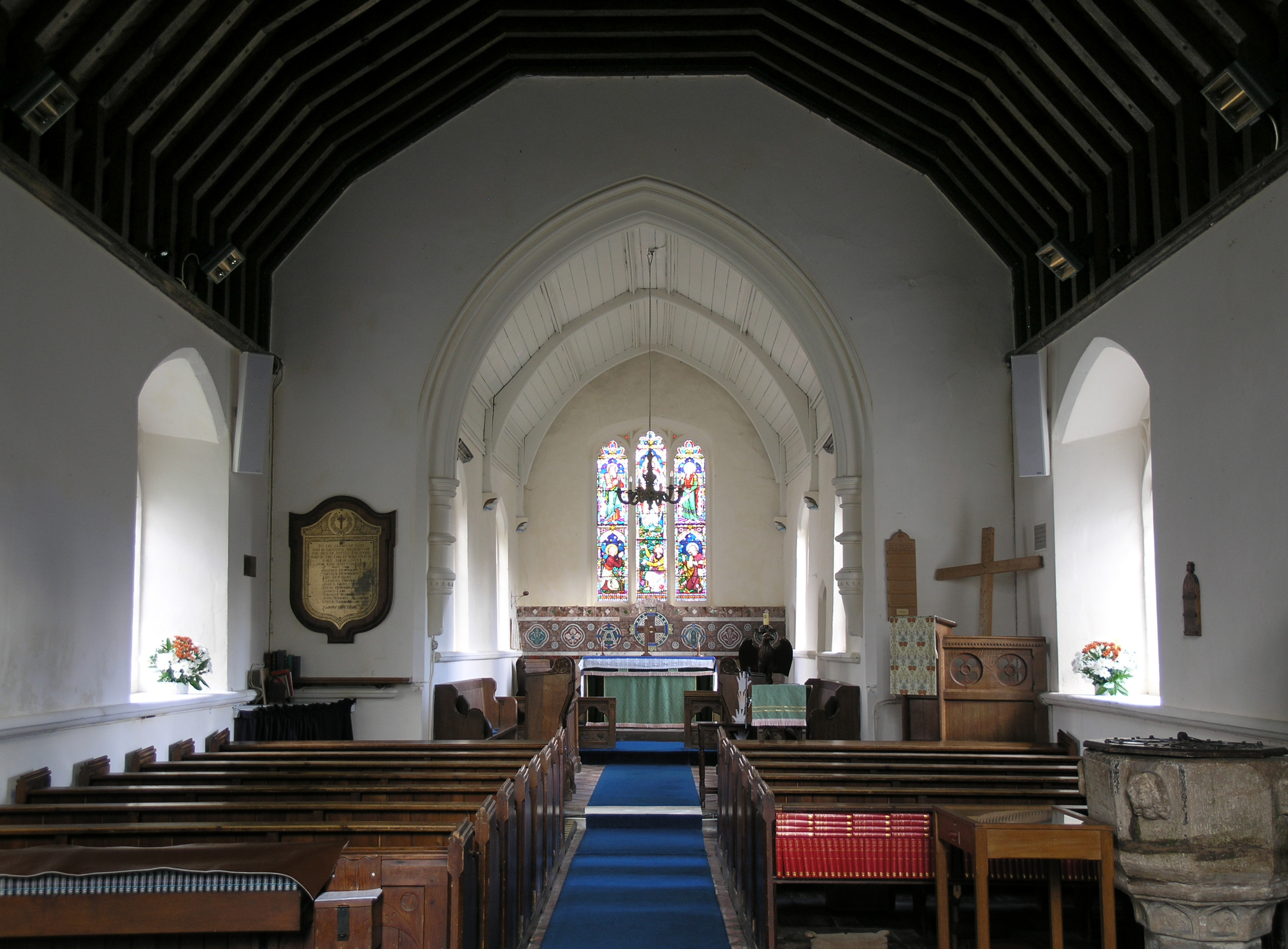
Nave looking east towards chancel
