= Wentworth, Cambridgeshire =

Village in Cambridgeshire, England

Coordinates: 52.3849°N 0.1745°E

Wentworth
- Location within Cambridgeshire
- Population: 200 2011 census
- Civil parish: Wentworth
- Shire county: Cambridgeshire
- Region: East
- Country: England
- Sovereign state: United Kingdom
- Post town: Ely
- Postcode district: CB6
- Police: Cambridgeshire
- Fire: Cambridgeshire
- Ambulance: East of England

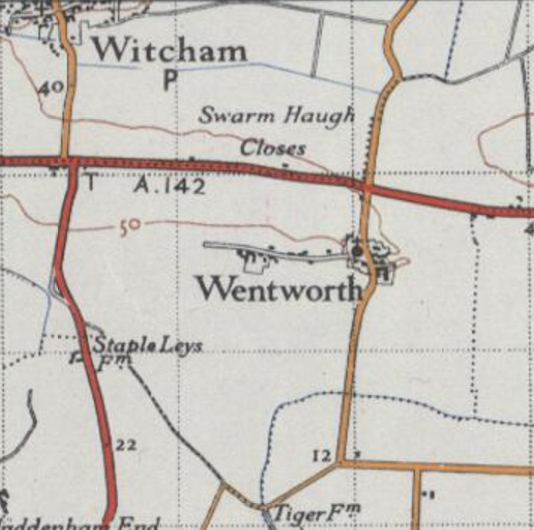
Ordnance survey 20th century map of Wentworth, Cambridgeshire

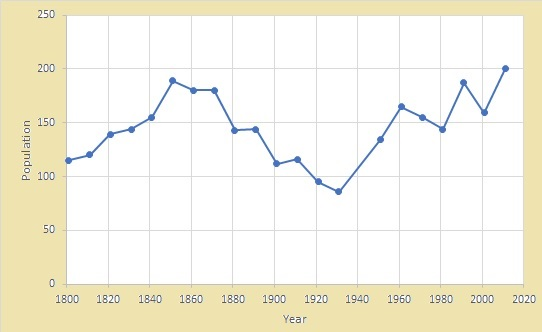
Changes in Wentworth population

Occupations by gender in Wentworth 1881

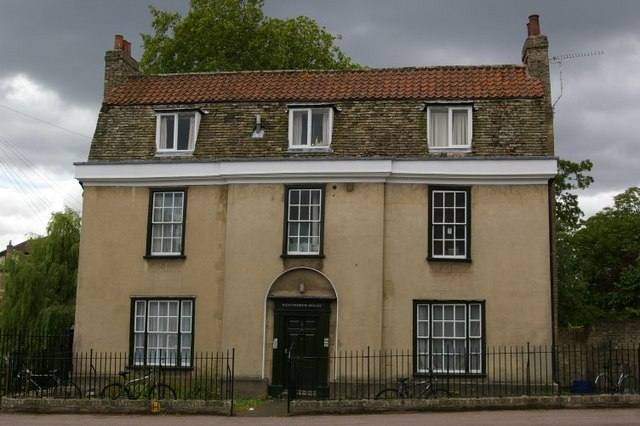
Wentworth House

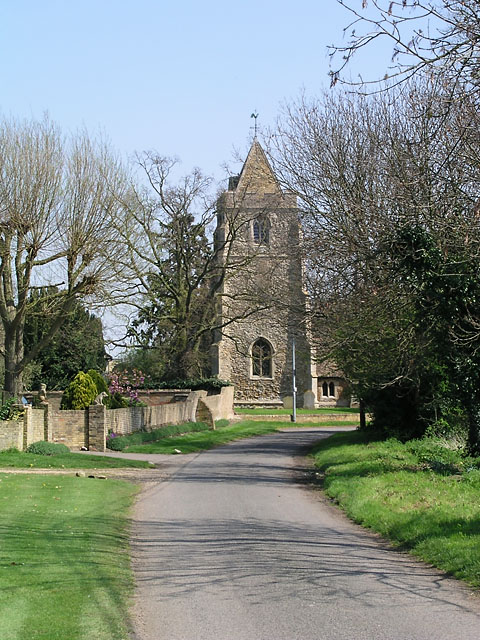
Looking west towards the church

Wentworth is a small village near Ely in Cambridgeshire, England. It is in the Isle of Ely, adjacent to Grunty Fen, Wentworth lies south of the A142 between Witchford and Sutton, approximately 5 miles west of Ely.

The village is centred on St Peter's Church and a number of listed buildings at the junction of Main Street and Church Road. Residents travel to nearby settlements, including Ely for many goods and services. There was no public transportation serving the village until 2017, when limited bus service began. The nearest railway station serving the village is Ely railway station.

In the 1870s, Wentworth, Cambridgeshire was described as:

" a parish in Ely district, Cambridge; 4½ miles W by S of Ely r. station. Post town, Ely. Acres, 1,437. Real property, £2,653. Pop., 180. Houses, 40. The living is a rectory in the diocese of Ely. Value, £450.* Patrons, the Dean and Chapter of Ely. The church is partly Norman, chiefly early English, and all good."

It is thought the name 'Wentworth' is:

"English: habitational name from places in Cambridgeshire and South Yorkshire called 'Wentworth', probably from the Old English byname Wintra meaning 'winter' + Old English worð 'enclosure'. It is, however, also possible that the name referred to a settlement inhabited only in winter."

The Domesday entry for Wentworth suggests that the village was then a fairly large one. Later, however, it declined in size.

== Demographics ==
The population of the civil parish at the 2011 census was 200. According to the 2011 census there were 78 males and 122 females living in the parish. "In the first national Census of 1881, the total population was recorded as 115. The population has remained very small since that time. It had dropped to 81 by the 1931 Census and now stands at 200." The time series graph below shows the change in population, 1801-2011. There was no census conducted in 1941: The population breakdown by age as at 2011 is shown in the table below:

Resident population by age
Age (years)	Number	% of total	District %
0-4	13	6.5	6.6
5-9	12	6.0	6.0
10-14	16	8.0	5.7
15-19	13	6.5	5.4
20-24	9	4.5	4.9
25-44	43	21.5	27.6
45-59	45	22.5	20.1
60-64	15	7.5	6.5
65-74	20	10.0	9.0
75-84	11	5.5	5.8
85-89	2	1.0	1.5
90+	1	0.5	0.8

These statistics have been compiled by Cambridgeshire County Council using data published by the Office for National Statistics to develop an excel data base for ease of access.

== Industry ==
The tables below show:

The population breakdown by occupation in Wentworth by gender, 1881 (left). Total population at the time was 143. However, this data only refers to 49% of the total population. The breakdown of economic activity in 2011 (right). This information has also been collated by Cambridgeshire County Council .

Occupation by gender 1881			Economic activity 2011				
Occupation	Male	Female	Economic activity (16–74 years population)				
					Number	% of total	District %
Professional occupation		2	Economically active	Working	103	72.0	72.8
Domestic services		9	Economically active	Employees	71	49.7	58.5
Railway officials/servants	1		Economically active	Self-employed	28	19.6	11.9
Agriculture	33		Economically active	working student	4	2.8	2.3
Shirt maker/seamstress		1	Economically active	Unemployed	1	0.7	2.9
General labourer	1		Economically inactive	Retired	16	11.2	13.5
Unspecified occupations		18	Economically inactive	Students	8	5.6	2.9
Unknown occupations	1	4	Economically inactive	Looking after home/family	8	5.6	4.2
Total	36	34	Economically inactive	Sick disabled	3	2.1	2.4
			Economically inactive	Other	4	2.8	1.3

== The Church of St Peter ==
The Grade II* listed parish church is dedicated to St Peter. "There has been a church on the site since the 12th century. This was extended in the 13th and 14th centuries and extensively restored and partially rebuilt in 1868. The church site now also serves as a venue for the Village Hall and is located in the centre of the village."

=== School ===
Wentworth had a small dame school in 1789. In 1846-7 it was reported that a Sunday-school, attended by 8 boys and 15 girls, was held in the chancel of the church. The parish clerk taught the pupils, and also held classes on weekday evenings in summer. In 1899, the average attendance was only 38 and in 1922 only 16. In the latter year, the county council, in the face of much local protest, closed the school. Children now attend school at Witchford.

== Present day ==
In 2011, the household summary statistics were as follows:

- Resident population - 200
- Number of households - 72
- Number of dwellings (approx) - 74
- Average household size (people) - 2.78

In 2010, the village was fortunate to receive funding for a new playpark from both the East Cambs. District Council Pathfinder Scheme, and the National Lottery.

== Local plan ==
The current local plan for East Cambridgeshire District Council (dated 2015) sets out a general blueprint for future growth (including Wentworth) up to 2031. It says that growth during this period will continue with an estimated 11 new dwellings, which will increase the total number of dwellings to 119. The Plan aims to prevent sprawl into the open countryside unless there are exceptional circumstances, such as essential dwellings for rural workers, or affordable housing. It also says that new employment proposals will be supported in principle, noting that there are no business premises in the village, though a handful of businesses are run from residential properties. It also aims to resist the loss of any community facilities and secure funding for improvements where possible.

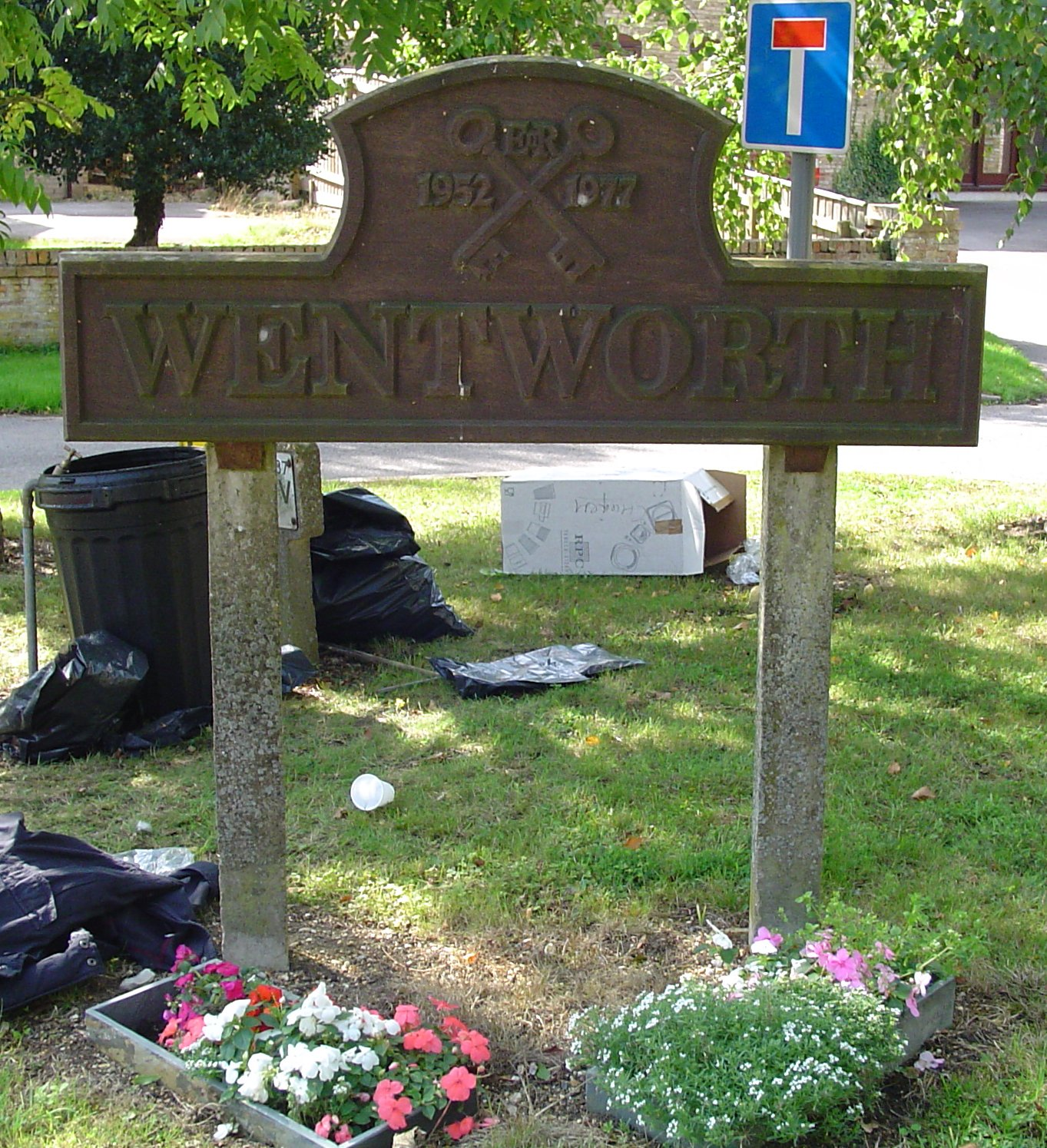
Village sign in Wentworth
