= Barway =

Village in Cambridgeshire, England

Coordinates: 52.35817°N 0.26969°E

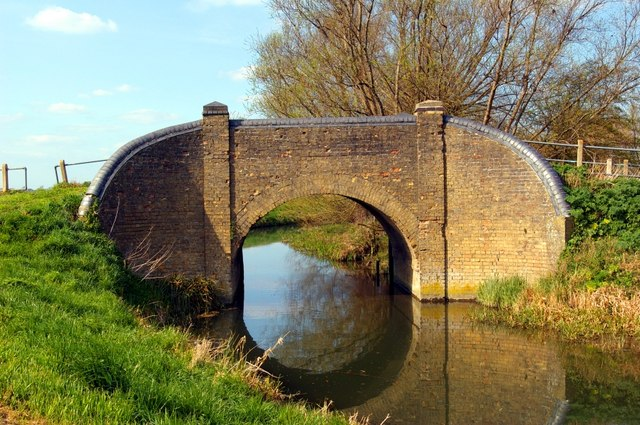
- Bridge over Soham Lode

- Location within Cambridgeshire
- OS grid reference: TL546757
- District: East Cambridgeshire
- Shire county: Cambridgeshire
- Region: East
- Country: England
- Sovereign state: United Kingdom
- Post town: CB7
- Dialling code: 01353
- Police: Cambridgeshire
- Fire: Cambridgeshire
- Ambulance: East of England

Barway is a village in Cambridgeshire, England, about three miles south of Ely. It is on Soham Lode, which flows into the River Cam. The population is included in the civil parish of Soham.

Its name is derived from the old English beorh, meaning barrow.
