= Grunty Fen =

Fen in Cambridgeshire, England

Coordinates: 52°22′5″N 00°11′5″E

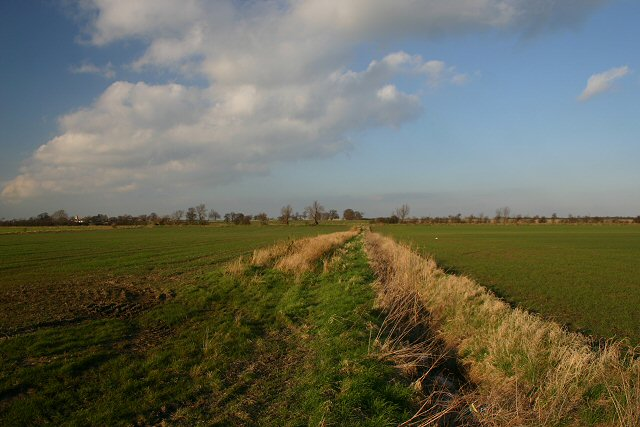
- Grunty Fen fields

- Location within Cambridgeshire
- Civil parish: Wilburton
- District: East Cambridgeshire
- Shire county: Cambridgeshire
- Region: East
- Country: England
- Sovereign state: United Kingdom

Map showing Isle of Ely with Grunty Fen near the centre in 1648 by J Blaeu

Grunty Fen is a fen and former civil parish, now in the parish of Wilburton, in the East Cambridgeshire district, in Cambridgeshire, England. It is 4 miles south west of Ely. In 1931 the parish had a population of 95.

== History ==
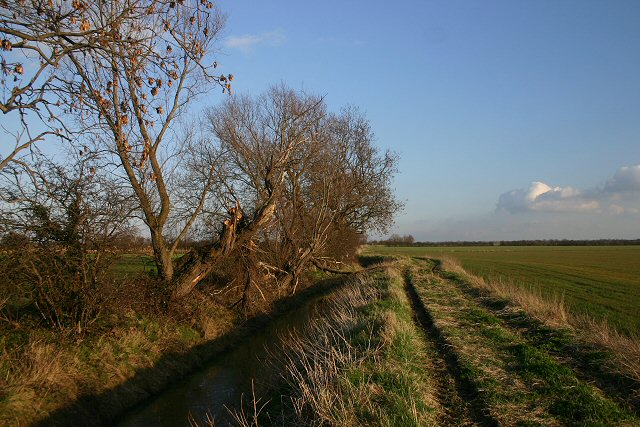
The catchwater drain, south of Wentworth

Grunty Fen consists of the low-lying land at the centre of the Isle of Ely that separates the villages of Wilburton and Stretham from Witchford and Wentworth; the area lies at under 5 metres above sea-level. Despite the importance of nearby Ely, the land around Grunty Fen was uninhabitable even following the draining of The Fens in the seventeenth century, and was still only used for sheep grazing and turf cutting through the eighteenth century. One of the last parts of The Fens to be drained, a catchwater drain was dug in 1838, though it took another couple of decades for the land to become completely dry. Following enclosure the land was farmed, but the thin peaty soil soon eroded and by the Second World War the area was largely uncultivated once more. There are now several working farms covering the fen.

The parish of Grunty Fen was situated in the hundred of South Witchford and covered an area of 1793 acres. At one stage the it was considered extra-parochial, with the area divided between the parishes of Ely, Witchford, Wentworth, Haddenham, Wilburton, Stretham, and Little Thetford. From 1858 Grunty Fen was a civil parish in its own right until it was abolished on 1 April 1933 and merged with Wilburton.

The Ely and St Ives Railway crossed the area and was jokingly called the "Grunty Fen Express". The former railway stations of Wilburton and Stretham that opened in 1866 both fell within the parish, closing to passenger traffic in 1931 and closing completely in July 1964.

The area made national headlines when Isle of Ely MP Clement Freud asked the Prime Minister Margaret Thatcher whether she had plans to visit Grunty Fen where residents were concerned about the level of wage settlements. Thatcher replied that the 97 residents were a happy, agricultural community with a low rate of unemployment. Clement Freud used to race a horse called Grunty Fen.

== Popular culture ==
From the late 1980s BBC Radio Cambridgeshire broadcast a weekly slot featuring Dennis of Grunty Fen, "Britain's favourite vocal yokel", a fictional character who lives in a converted railway carriage with his 92-year-old grandmother. Despite the death of the creator, Pete Sayers, in 2005, the character's popularity continues.

An annual race known as the Grunty Fen Half Marathon has been run annually since 1991. The race starts and ends at Witchford Village College.
