= Thetford, Cambridgeshire =

Civil parish in Cambridgeshire, England

Coordinates: 52.3595°N 0.2407°E

Village sign, 2010

Thetford is a civil parish in the ward of Stretham, near Ely, in the East Cambridgeshire district, in the county of Cambridgeshire, England. The village of Little Thetford is coterminous with the parish. In the 2001 census, the parish had a population of 639.
