= Catchwater drain =

Artificial ditch for rain collection

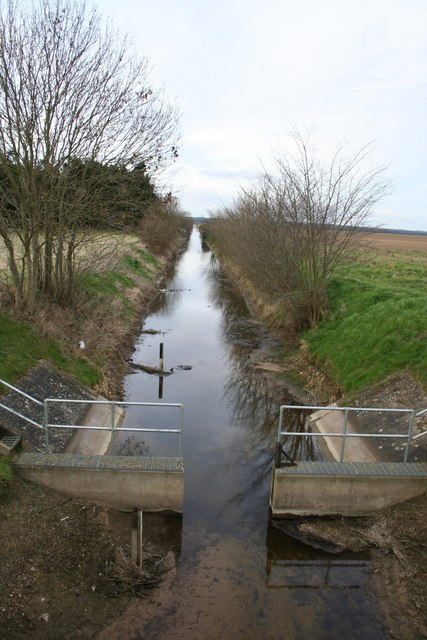
Catchwater drain facing north at Tumby Woodside

A catchwater drain is a man-made land drain, a ditch cut across the fall of the land, typically just above the level of low-lying, level ground such as The Fens of eastern England, where some land, tens of kilometres from the sea is at about sea level. Its purpose is to gather water draining from the higher, sloping ground before it reaches the flat land whence it would be difficult or expensive to remove. The water may be on the surface, in streams or in the ground before it is gathered, perhaps to be led away across the lowland by an embanked river.

There are other circumstances in which a catchwater may be employed. A hill-top or hillside may be used to trap rainwater which is then gathered by the catchwater and fed to a reservoir. From this a house, village or town may be supplied. Catchwater may be used to slow down runoff before running on impervious surfaces to reduce runoff.

== See also ==
- Nullah
