= Wilburton =

Village in Cambridgeshire, England

Coordinates: 52.3521°N 0.1766°E

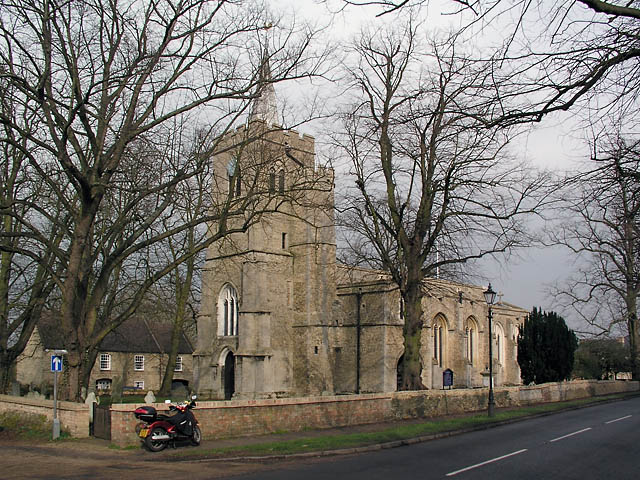

- Location within Cambridgeshire
- Area: 0.6564 km^{2} (0.2534 sq mi)
- Population: 921 (2024 estimate)
  - Density: 1,403/km^{2} (3,630/sq mi)
- OS grid reference: TL484750
  - London: 60 mi (97 km) S
- Civil parish: Wilburton
- District: East Cambridgeshire
- Shire county: Cambridgeshire
- Region: East
- Country: England
- Sovereign state: United Kingdom
- Post town: ELY
- Postcode district: CB6
- Dialling code: 01353
- Police: Cambridgeshire
- Fire: Cambridgeshire
- Ambulance: East of England
- UK Parliament: South East Cambridgeshire

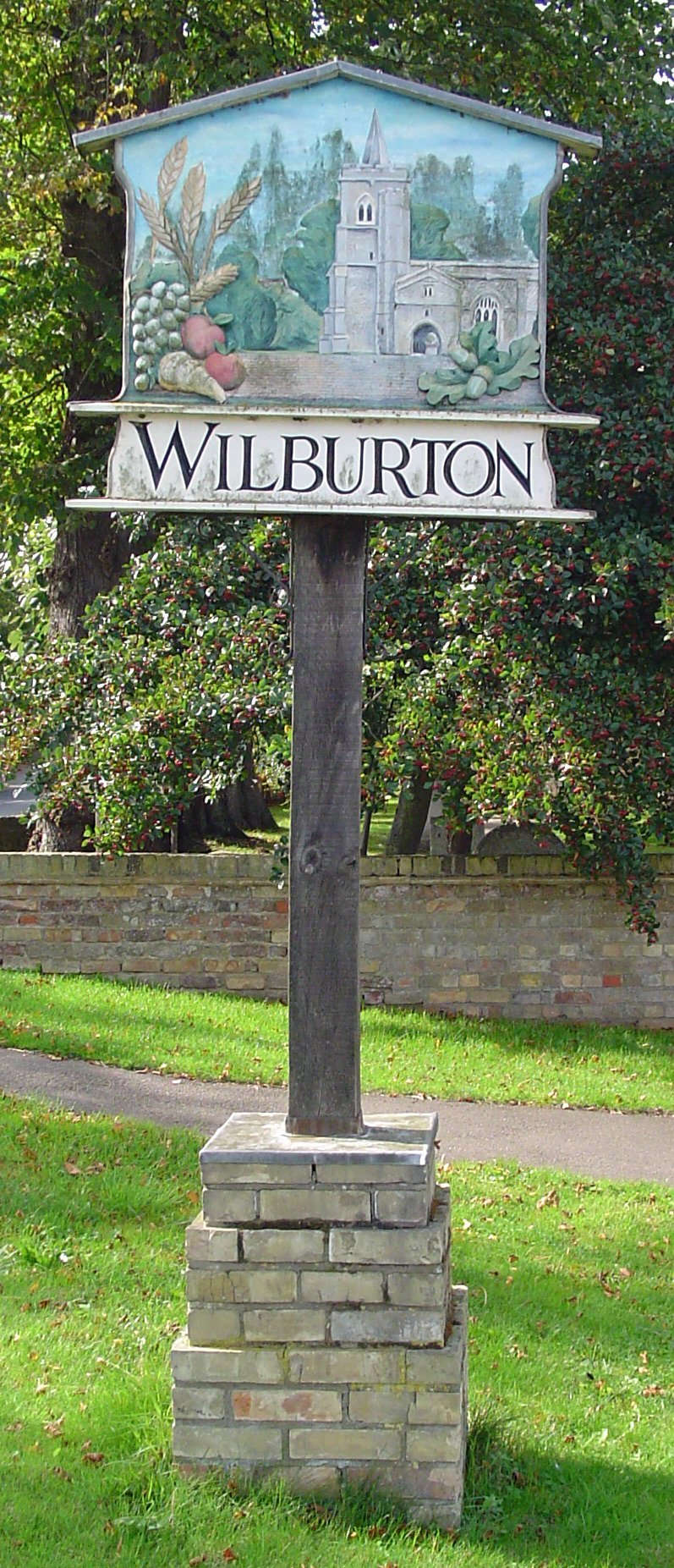
Signpost in Wilburton

Wilburton is a village and civil parish in the East Cambridgeshire district, in the county of Cambridgeshire, England. It is 6 miles south west of Ely. While nominally an agricultural village, many residents work in Cambridge, Ely or London. In 2024 the built-up area had an estimated population of 921. In 2024 the parish had an estimated population of 1585.

== History ==
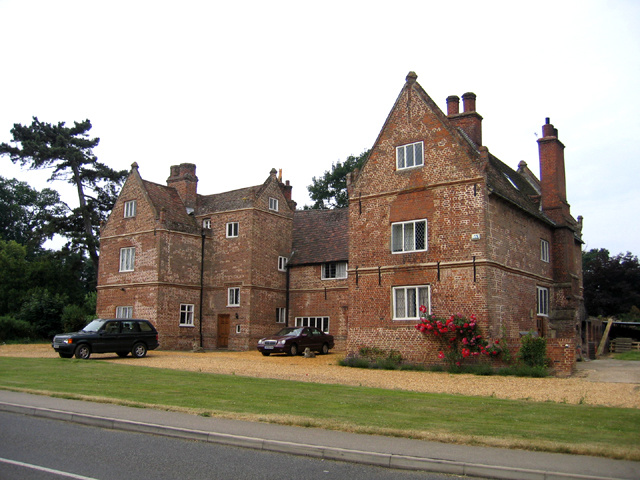
Burystead

Wilburton is a parish of around 800 acres lying on the important medieval route from Earith to Stretham, and extending south to the River Great Ouse. As much of the land in the region is fenland, the village's position on the ridge between Stretham and Haddenham at the southern end of the Isle of Ely was important in its growth and success. Listed as Wilburhtun in 970 and Wilbertone in the Domesday Book, the name "Wilburton" means "Farmstead or village of a woman called Wilburh".

The village contains a number of old buildings, and was described in the 19th century as "very neat and contains some excellent houses". These include the Burystead (the former manor house, built c.1600), one of the few surviving half-timbered houses in the region, and the Victoria Place row of cottages. For the last few hundred years, the Pell family were the prominent local landowners, sponsoring the Ely and St Ives Railway in the late 19th century. Wilburton railway station, built in 1866, has been open for goods trains only since 1931.

== Church ==
The parish church, dedicated to St Peter consists of a chancel, north vestry and organ chamber, a nave, north chapel, south porch, and west tower. The chancel arch and tower date from the 13th century and the extensive rebuilding in the second half of the 15th century produced the chancel, vestry, nave, and porch. The organ chamber and north chapel were added in the late 19th century. The three-storey tower contains five bells, all dating from the 17th century.

== Wilburton-Wallington Phase ==
The Wilburton-Wallington Phase is the name given by archaeologists to a metalworking stage of the Bronze Age in Britain spanning the period between c. 1140 BC and c. 1020 BC. The Wilburton complex was present in the south of Britain and the Wallington (Northumberland) complex in the north. Both are characterised by the introduction of copper-lead-tin alloys in bronze making and by the manufacture of leaf-shaped slashing swords, socketed spearheads secured to a shaft with a peg, horse-bits and socketed axes. It is paralleled by the Poldar industries in Scotland and the Roscommon industries in Ireland as well as being linked with the Urnfield A2-B1 in South Germany. It is preceded in Britain by the Penard Period, and followed by the Blackmoor Period.

== Village life ==
Their village is home to an Elizabethan manor house and a garden centre. There was one public house, The King's Head which closed in 2020 but plans exist for the public house to be reopend in the near future. There is also a hall called St Peter's Hall that is used for events by the local community, such as school plays, wedding receptions, and after-school clubs. Adjoining St Peter's Hall is a social club. The village holds a fireworks display around Guy Fawkes night and an annual beer festivals.

Wilburton is home to two amateur football teams, Wilburton Blades and Wilburton Albion. Wilburton Fc was formed in 2006 by two local residents after both previous teams folded. The club grew into having a first and reserve team with having over 50 players associated to the club. The club ran for over 6 years turning from bottom of the table to competing for the league and winning several Invitational cups and trophies during its 6-year history.

== See also ==
- Doghouse Grove nature reserve, south of the village
- Grunty Fen, a former parish, now amalgamated with the village
