= Witchford =

Village in Cambridgeshire, England

Coordinates: 52.387°N 0.206°E

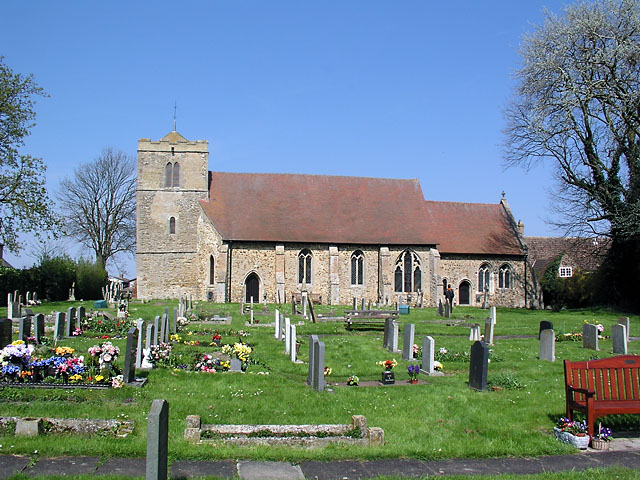
- St Andrew's parish church

- Location within Cambridgeshire
- Population: 2,385 (2011 Census)
- OS grid reference: TL5078
- Civil parish: Witchford
- District: East Cambridgeshire
- Shire county: Cambridgeshire
- Region: East
- Country: England
- Sovereign state: United Kingdom
- Post town: Ely
- Postcode district: CB6
- Dialling code: 01353
- Police: Cambridgeshire
- Fire: Cambridgeshire
- Ambulance: East of England
- UK Parliament: North East Cambridgeshire
- Website: Witchford Online

Witchford /ˈwɪtʃfɔːrd/ is a village and civil parish about 2.5 miles (4 km) west of Ely, Cambridgeshire, England. The 2011 Census recorded the parish's population as 2,385.

== History ==
=== Anglo-Saxon cemetery ===
When the site of RAF Witchford was being cleared a bulldozer driver found an Anglo-Saxon pagan cemetery on the site. The bulldozer unearthed and crushed about 30 skeletons. Little archaeological work could be undertaken but some artefacts were recovered, which T. C. Lethbridge stated to be consistent with the period AD 450–650.

More recent survey work has found Iron Age and Roman domestic and other remains. An Anglo-Saxon cemetery was not found at that time, leading to the conclusion that this was not the site of the lost village of Cratendune.

=== Hundreds ===
Two hundreds of the Isle of Ely, North Witchford and South Witchford, took their name from the place and had their meeting-place at Witchford.

=== RAF Witchford ===
RAF Witchford was an RAF Bomber Command station that was built in 1942 and closed and dismantled in 1946. From July to September 1943 it was the base of No. 196 Squadron RAF which operated Vickers Wellington medium bombers. From November 1943 until April 1945 No. 115 Squadron RAF was based at Witchford operating Avro Lancaster heavy bombers.

After the Second World War it was proposed to convert the airfield to a missile base. Rumours said it was to become a Blue Streak base. Hence some older residents refer to the site (now an industrial park) as "The Rocket Base".

The village has an RAF Witchford Museum.

== Church and chapel ==
=== Parish church ===
The oldest part of the Church of England parish church of St Andrew are its 13th-century font and west tower. The nave and chancel were rebuilt in 1376. Two 14th- or 15th-century niches flank the chancel arch. The timber frame of the nave roof is 17th-century. The west tower has a ring of three bells, all cast by Christopher Graye of Haddenham in 1671. St Andrew's is a Grade II* listed building.

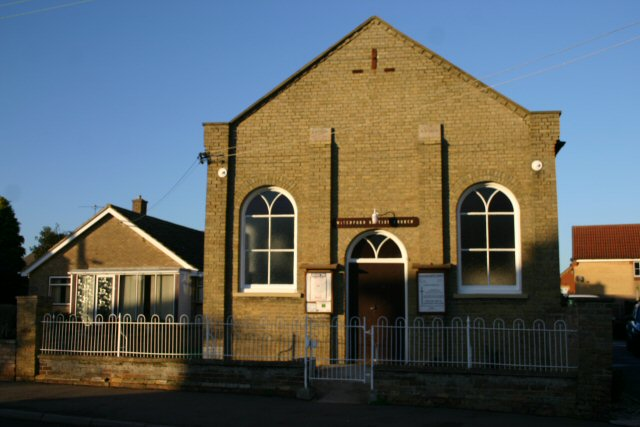
Former Baptist Chapel, Main Street, Witchford

=== Baptist chapel ===
Witchford had a Baptist chapel up until 2021. The building was originally constructed in 1875. It is currently in use as a village shop.

== Amenities ==
=== School ===
Witchford Village College is a secondary school that serves all the surrounding parishes, including Haddenham, Little Thetford, Mepal, Stretham, Sutton, Wilburton and Witcham.

=== Pub ===
Witchford has a pub, the Village Inn.

=== Half Marathon ===
The parish hosts the Grunty Fen Half Marathon road race, which has been held here annually since 1991. The race begins and ends at Witchford Village College and involves two laps into the nearby Grunty Fen.
