= List of churches in East Cambridgeshire =

The following is a list of churches in East Cambridgeshire.

== Active churches ==
There are churches in every civil parish.

The district has an estimated 71 churches for 87,800 inhabitants, a rato of one church to every 1,237 people.

Name	Civil parish	Dedication	Web	Founded	Denomination	Benefice	Notes
St Mary, Brinkley	Brinkley	Mary		Medieval	Church of England	Raddesley Group	Benefice includes one church in South Cambridgeshire
St George Mission Church, Six Mile Bottom	Brinkley (Six Mile Bottom)	George		1890s	Church of England	Fulbourn & the Wilbrahams	Building 1933. Benefice includes 3 churches in S Cambs.
St Augustine of Canterbury, Burrough Green	Burrough Green	Augustine of Canterbury		Medieval	Church of England	Raddesley Group	
St Mary the Less, Westley Waterless	Westley Waterless	Mary		Medieval	Church of England	Raddesley Group	
St Mary, Dullingham	Dullingham	Mary		Medieval	Church of England	Raddesley Group	
St Peter, Stetchworth	Stetchworth	Peter		Medieval	Church of England	Raddesley Group	
Stetchworth United Reformed Church	Stetchworth				URC		Current building 1963
All Saints, Kirtling	Kirtling	All Saints		Medieval	Church of England	Cheveley Group	
Our Lady & St Philip, Kirtling	Kirtling	Mary & Philip			Roman Catholic	Newmarket & Kirtling Parish	
St Mary, Woodditton	Woodditton	Mary		Medieval	Church of England	Cheveley Group	
Saxon Street Methodist Church	Woodditton (Saxon Street)			pre-1885	Methodist	Ely & Newmarket Circuit	Current building 1885
St Mary, Cheveley	Cheveley	Mary		Medieval	Church of England	Cheveley Group	
Cheveley United Reformed Church	Cheveley				URC		
St Mary, Ashley with Silverley	Ashley	Mary		Medieval	Church of England	Cheveley Group	Hospitaller chapel used from 1550. Rebuilt 1845
Holy Trinity, Bottisham	Bottisham	Trinity		Medieval	Church of England	Anglesey Group	Benefice includes one church in South Cambridgeshire.
RENEW Church	Bottisham				Baptist Union		Met in Lode Chapel; now use Bottisham Primary School
St Mary, Swaffham Bulbeck	Swaffham Bulbeck	Mary		Medieval	Church of England	Anglesey Group	
St James, Lode with Longmeadow	Lode	James		1853	Church of England	Anglesey Group	
St Mary, Swaffham Prior	Swaffham Prior	Mary		Medieval	Church of England	Anglesey Group	
St Etheldreda & Holy Trinity, Reach	Reach	Æthelthryth & Trinity		1861	Church of England	Burwell & Reach	Older medieval church was ruined C18th for 100 years
St Mary, Burwell	Burwell	Mary		Medieval	Church of England	Burwell & Reach	
Burwell Baptist Church	Burwell				Baptist Union		
Trinity Church Burwell	Burwell	Trinity			Methodist / URC	Ely & Newmarket Circuit	
St Laurence, Wicken	Wicken	Laurence of Rome		Medieval	Church of England	Soham & Wicken	
Wicken Methodist Church	Wicken				Methodist	Ely & Newmarket Circuit	
St Andrew, Soham	Soham	Andrew		Medieval	Church of England	Soham & Wicken	
Soham Baptist Church	Soham			1752	FIEC		Current building 1832. Joined FIEC 1984
Soham Methodist Church	Soham			pre-1869	Methodist	Ely & Newmarket Circuit	Current building 1869
Soham Salvation Army	Soham				Salvation Army		
SS Peter & Mary Magdalene, Fordham	Fordham	Peter, Mary Magdalene		Medieval	Church of England	Three Rivers Group	
St Andrew, Isleham	Isleham	Andrew		Medieval	Church of England	Three Rivers Group	
Pound Lane Free Church	Isleham				FIEC		
High Street Church, Isleham	Isleham			1812			Began as High St Baptist Church. New building 2008
St Margaret, Chippenham	Chippenham	Margaret the Virgin		Medieval	Church of England	Three Rivers Group	
St Nicholas, Kennett	Kennett	Nicholas		Medieval	Church of England	Three Rivers Group	
St Peter, Snailwell	Snailwell	Peter		Medieval	Church of England	Three Rivers Group	
St James, Stretham	Stretham	James		Medieval	CoE / Methodist	Ely Team	Reconstructed 1876
St George, Little Thetford	Thetford	George		Medieval	Church of England	Ely Team	Formerly chapel of ease to Stretham
Little Thetford Baptist Church	Thetford			1867	Baptist Union		
Cathedral of the Holy & Undivided Trinity, Ely	Ely	Trinity		Medieval	Church of England	Ely Cathedral & St Peter's	Cath. since 1109. Ded. to SS Etheldreda, Peter till C16th
St Mary, Ely	Ely	Mary		Medieval	Church of England	Ely Team	
St Peter-in-Ely	Ely	Peter		1890	Church of England		
St Etheldreda, Ely	Ely	Æthelthryth		1890-1892	Roman Catholic		Current building 1903, consecrated 1987
Ely Methodist Church	Ely				Methodist	Ely & Newmarket Circuit	
Countess Free Church Ely	Ely			C18th	CHC		
New Connexions Free Church Ely	Ely			2007	CHC		Meets in Ely St Mary's School, High Barns
Ely Gospel Hall	Ely				Gospel Hall		
Lighthouse Ely	Ely				?		
Ely City Church	Ely				?		Was Olive Tree Fellowship until 2016
Holy Cross, Stuntney	Ely (Stuntney)	Cross		Medieval	Church of England	Ely Team	Rebuilt 1876. Formerly chapel of ease to Ely Holy Trinity
Prickwillow Baptist Church	Ely (Prickwillow)			1875	Baptist Union		
St Michael & All Angels, Chettisham	Ely (Chettisham)	Michael & Angels		Medieval	Church of England	Ely Team	Chapel of ease to Ely St Mary until 1876
St Leonard, Little Downham	Downham	Leonard of Noblac		Medieval	CoE / Methodist	Ely Team	
Pymoor Methodist Church	Downham (Pymoor)				Methodist	Ely & Newmarket Circuit	
St Peter, Wilburton	Wilburton	Peter		Medieval	Church of England		
Wilburton Community Baptist Church	Wilburton				Baptist Union		
Holy Trinity, Haddenham	Haddenham	Trinity		Medieval	Church of England		
Haddenham Baptist Church	Haddenham				Baptist Union		
Haddenham Methodist Church	Haddenham				Methodist	Ely & Newmarket Circuit	
St Andrew, Witchford	Witchford	Andrew		Medieval	Church of England	Witchford & Wentworth	
Witchford Baptist Church	Witchford				Baptist Union		
St Peter, Wentworth	Wentworth	Peter		Medieval	Church of England	Witchford & Wentworth	
St Andrew, Sutton-in-the-Isle	Sutton	Andrew		Medieval	Church of England		
St Martin, Witcham	Witcham	Martin of Tours		Medieval	Church of England	Witcham & Mepal	
St Mary, Mepal	Mepal	Mary		Medieval	Church of England	Witcham & Mepal	
St Peter-ad-Vincula, Coveney	Coveney	Peter		Medieval	Church of England		
Coveney Methodist Church	Coveney				Methodist	Ely & Newmarket Circuit	
St George, Littleport	Littleport	George		Medieval	Church of England		
St John's Methodist Church, Littleport	Littleport	John the Evangelist		1835	Methodist	Ely & Newmarket Circuit	
Littleport Salvation Army	Littleport				Salvation Army		
The Vine Community Church, Littleport	Littleport			1987	?		Planted from High Street Church, Isleham

== Defunct churches ==
Name	Civil parish	Dedication	Founded	Redundant	Denomination	Notes
St Cyriac and St Julitta, Swaffham Prior	Swaffham Prior	Quiricus and Julietta	Medieval	1903	Church of England	Rebuilt 1806-1809. Churches Conservation Trust
St Peter, Prickwillow	Ely (Prickwillow)	Peter	1866-1868	2008	Church of England	
St Matthew, Littleport	Littleport	Matthew	1870s		Church of England	Now a house
All Saints, Silverley	Ashley	All Saints	Medieval	C16th	Church of England	

== Map of medieval parish churches ==
=== Cambridgeshire ===
Medieval parish churches in Cambridgeshire

=== Central Cambridge ===
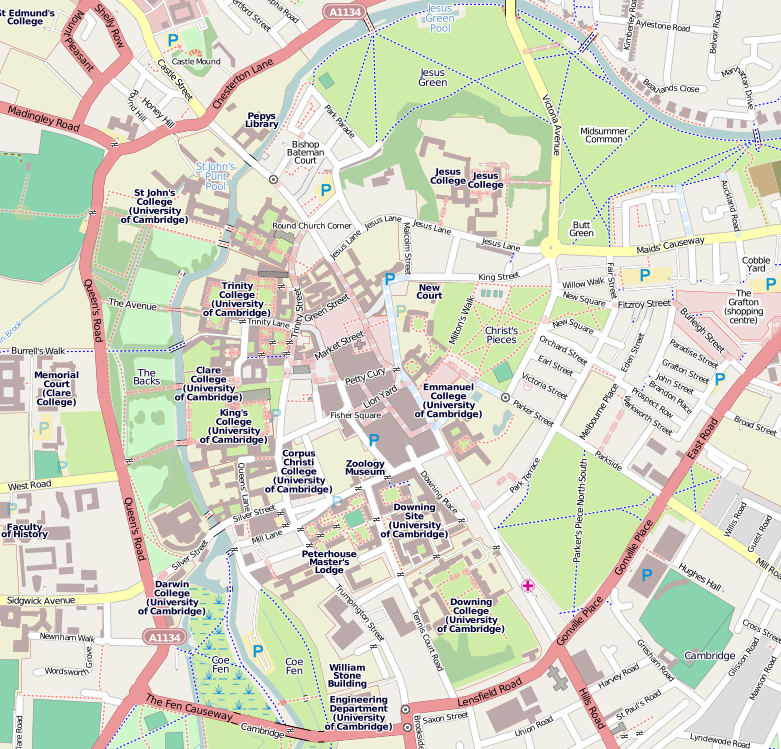
Medieval parish churches in Cambridge Central
