= East Cambridgeshire District Council elections =

Local government elections in Cambridgeshire, England

East Cambridgeshire District Council is a non-metropolitan district council in the county of Cambridgeshire in the United Kingdom. Elections are held every four years.

== Council elections ==
Election	Conservative	Labour	Liberal Democrat (Note: Liberal Party prior to 1982, SDP-Liberal Alliance from 1982 to 1988.)	Others	Total
1973	0	2	0	33	35
1976	4	0	0	31	35
1979	2	0	0	33	35
1983	3	1	1	32	37 (Note: New ward boundaries: The District of East Cambridgeshire (Electoral Arrangements) Order 1980)
1987	3	1	5	28	37
1991	6	1	4	26	37
1995	0	3	12	22	37 (Note: Minor alterations to district boundaries: The Cambridgeshire and Suffolk (County Boundaries) Order 1992.)
1999	1	4	20	12	37
2003	15	0	18	6	39 (Note: New ward boundaries: The District of East Cambridgeshire (Electoral Changes) Order 2002.)
2007	24	0	13	2	39
2011	25	0	10	4	39
2015	36	0	2	1	39
2019	15	0	13	0	28 (Note: New ward boundaries: The East Cambridgeshire (Electoral Changes) Order 2016)
2023	15	0	13	0	28

- Notes:

== Results maps ==
2003 results map

2007 results map

2011 results map

2015 results map

2019 results map

2023 results map

== By-election results ==
=== 2003-2007 ===
The Swaffhams By-Election 6 May 2004
Party	Candidate	Votes	%	±%
Conservative	Allen Alderson	389	50.4	+50.4
Liberal Democrats	Francesca Marlow	344	44.6	−41.0
Labour	Steven O'Dell	39	5.1	−9.3
Majority		45	5.8	
Turnout		772		
Conservative gain from Liberal Democrats		Swing		

The Swaffhams By-Election 20 October 2005
Party	Candidate	Votes	%	±%
Conservative		539	66.5	+4.8
Liberal Democrats		202	24.9	−0.4
Labour		70	8.6	−5.2
Majority		337	41.6	
Turnout		811		
Conservative hold		Swing		

=== 2011-2015 ===
Ely East By-Election 5 September 2013
Party	Candidate	Votes	%	±%
Conservative	Lis Every	418	37.5	−4.5
Liberal Democrats	Dian Warman	322	28.9	−8.2
UKIP	Jeremy Tyrrell	145	13.0	+13.0
Labour	Jane Frances	138	12.4	−8.6
Independent	John Borland	93	8.3	+8.3
Majority		96	8.6	
Turnout		1,116		
Conservative hold		Swing		

Sutton By-Election 24 April 2014
Party	Candidate	Votes	%	±%
Liberal Democrats	Lorna Dupre	523	50.9	+27.0
Conservative	Neil Hitchin	280	27.2	−19.2
UKIP	Daniel Divine	162	15.8	+15.8
Labour	Jane Frances	63	6.1	−23.6
Majority		243	23.6	
Turnout		1,028		
Liberal Democrats gain from Conservative		Swing		

Soham South By-Election 19 June 2014
Party	Candidate	Votes	%	±%
Conservative	Hamish Ross	363	34.4	−1.5
UKIP	Daniel Divine	201	19.1	+19.1
Liberal Democrats	Charles Warner	191	18.1	−1.0
Independent	Geoffrey Woollard	148	14.0	+14.0
Independent	Gerard Hobbs	80	7.6	+7.6
Labour	Fiona Ross	71	6.7	−9.4
Majority		162	15.4	
Turnout		1,054		
Conservative gain from Independent		Swing		

=== 2015-2019 ===
Bottisham By-Election 4 February 2016
Party	Candidate	Votes	%	±%
Conservative	Alan Sharp	421	43.6	−8.2
Liberal Democrats	Steven Aronson	403	41.7	+9.8
Labour	Steven O'Dell	99	10.2	−6.1
UKIP	Daniel Divine	43	4.5	+4.5
Majority		18	1.9	
Turnout		966		
Conservative hold		Swing		

Soham North By-Election 22 June 2017
Party	Candidate	Votes	%	±%
Conservative	Mark Goldsack	423	59.7	−4.2
Liberal Democrats	Alec Jones	178	25.1	+4.6
Labour	Peter Tyson	108	15.2	−0.4
Majority		245	34.6	
Turnout		709		
Conservative hold		Swing		

Ely South By-Election 7 September 2017
Party	Candidate	Votes	%	±%
Liberal Democrats	Christine Whelan	527	39.9	+13.2
Conservative	Sarah Bellow	411	31.1	−19.7
Labour	Rebecca Denness	384	29.0	+6.4
Majority		116	8.8	
Turnout		1,322		
Liberal Democrats gain from Conservative		Swing		

=== 2019-2023 ===
Soham North By-Election 23 September 2021
Party	Candidate	Votes	%	±%
Conservative	Mark Goldsack	484	50.8	+8.6
Liberal Democrats	Anne Pallett	369	38.8	−9.1
Labour	Sam Mathieson	71	7.5	−2.4
Green	Andrew Cohen	28	2.9	+2.9
Majority		115	12.1	
Turnout		952		
Conservative gain from Liberal Democrats		Swing		

=== 2023-2027 ===
Ely West By-Election 18 April 2024
Party	Candidate	Votes	%	±%
Liberal Democrats	Ross Trent	1,125	47.9	
Conservative	David Ambrose Smith	760	32.3	
Labour	Adam Wilson	466	19.8	
Majority		365	15.5	
Turnout		2,351		
Liberal Democrats hold		Swing		

The by-election followed the resignation of Lib Dem Councillor Rob Pitt.

Stretham By-Election 1 May 2025
Party	Candidate	Votes	%	±%
Liberal Democrats	Lee Denney	820	36.8	
Conservative	William Ralph Furness	655	29.4	
Reform	Ryan Coogan	526	23.6	
Green	David Woricker	131	5.9	
Labour	Mark Hucker	95	4.3	
Majority		165	7.4	
Turnout		2,230	39.18%	
Liberal Democrats hold		Swing		

The by-election followed the resignation of Lib Dem Councillor Caroline Shepherd.
