= Barcroft =

Barcroft as a personal name can refer to:

- Barcroft Boake (poet) (1866–1892), Australian poet
- Stacy Barcroft Lloyd, Jr. (1908–1994), American businessman, horse breeder, dairy cattle farmer and yachtsman

Barcroft as a family name can refer to:

- George Barcroft (before 1574–c.1610), English composer of church music
- Sir Joseph Barcroft (1872–1947), British physiologist
- Judith Barcroft (born 1942), American Broadway and soap opera actress
- Peter Barcroft (1929–1977), English cricketer
- Roy Barcroft (1902–1969), American character actor
- Tom Barcroft (1870–after 1909), English football secretary-manager

Barcroft as a place name can refer to:

- Barcroft, West Yorkshire, a place in West Yorkshire in the United Kingdom
- Barcroft, a neighborhood in Arlington County, Virginia
- Barcroft Community House, a historic community center located at Arlington, Virginia, United States
- Barcroft Islands, a group of small islands in Antarctica named after Sir Joseph Barcroft
- Barcroft Park, a baseball venue located in Arlington, Virginia, United States
- Lake Barcroft, Virginia, a census-designated place in Fairfax County, Virginia, United States
- Barcroft TV
