= Upware North Pit =

Protected area in Cambridgeshire, England

Coordinates: 52.331°N 0.264°E

- Site of Special Scientific Interest
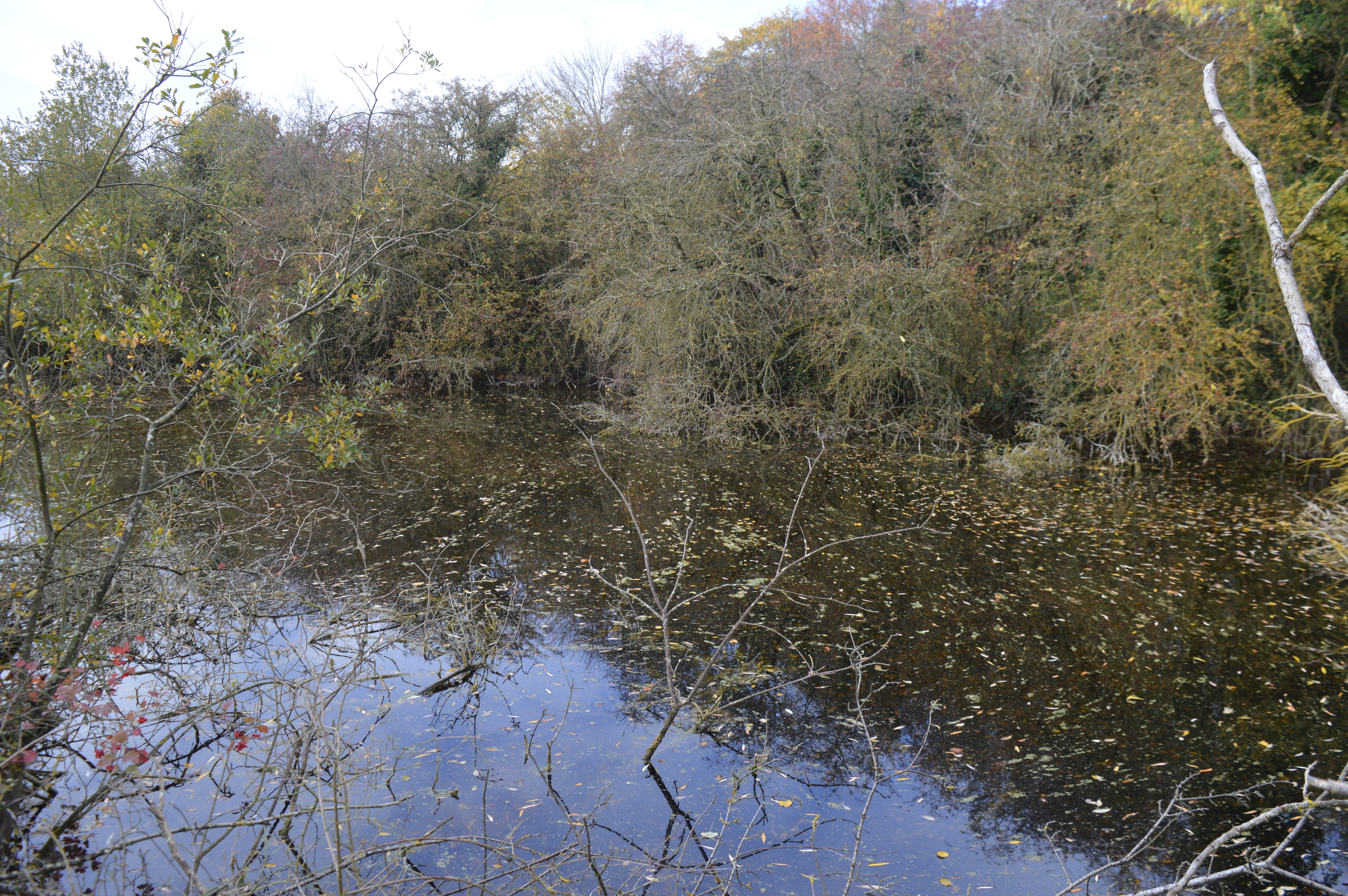
- Location of Upware North Pit.
- Area of search: Cambridgeshire
- Grid reference: TL 544 727
- Interest: Biological
- Area: 1.1 hectares
- Notification date: 1985
- Location map: Magic Map

Upware North Pit is a 1.1-hectare (2.7-acre) biological Site of Special Scientific Interest north-west of Wicken in Cambridgeshire.

This site has several flooded pits with areas of willow and hawthorn. It is one of only two British sites which has water germander, a plant listed in the British Red Data Books of threatened species. Other unusual aquatic plants are great water dock and greater pond sedge.

There is access to the site from the Fen Rivers Way north of Upware.
