= Mereham =

Planned town in Cambridgeshire, England

Coordinates: 52.35°N 0.2°E

Mereham was a potential new town near Ely in East Cambridgeshire, England. Developer Multiplex Stannifer has not received planning permission yet. East Cambridgeshire District Council turned down the initial planning application, though the developers subsequently appealed. The inquiry closed on 8 January 2008. The Planning Inspector, Richard Ogier, made his report in April 2008, and in August 2008 the Secretary of State for Communities, Hazel Blears, announced that permission for the development had been refused.

== Overview ==
Plans for Merham have been rejected by East Cambridgeshire District Council (supported by Cambridgeshire County Council) and the necessary associated works to the A10 in the adjacent District of South Cambridgeshire were also refused. The main concerns were the size of the town (which would consist of around 5000 new homes) and the transport links to the development sites both to Ely and Cambridge. The site is south of the A1123, west of the A10, north of the River Ouse and east of the B1049 Twenty Pence Road.

An Inquiry took over a week to hear evidence from local residents on a number of issues including traffic, impact on local wildlife and the potential drain on local services.

== Opposition ==
'Say No to Mereham', a protest group of villagers in Haddenham, Wilburton, Stretham and Witchford, has been set up to oppose the building of Mereham..

According to an article in the Ely Standard newspaper, the campaign members are also taking court action against Multiplex to reimburse their members for lost wages and expenses incurred during the public inquiry. The local district and county councils are also claiming costs incurred via their legal representatives.

== Decision ==
The Planning Inspector submitted his report to Hazel Blears at the end of April 2008. The decision was released on Friday 29 August 2008, with all 3 appeals being dismissed by the Secretary of State. Ms Blears concurred that there were significant deficiencies in the plans but she recognised the inevitability of substantial new housing development in the district in the coming years. No awards of costs were made in connection with the appeals.

== Re-submission ==
On 5 November 2008, the Ely Standard reported that Multiplex Stannifer have re-submitted the proposal, this time to the East of England Regional Authority, which has a housing construction target for the area.
