= Charlotte Cane =

British politician

Charlotte Cane MP
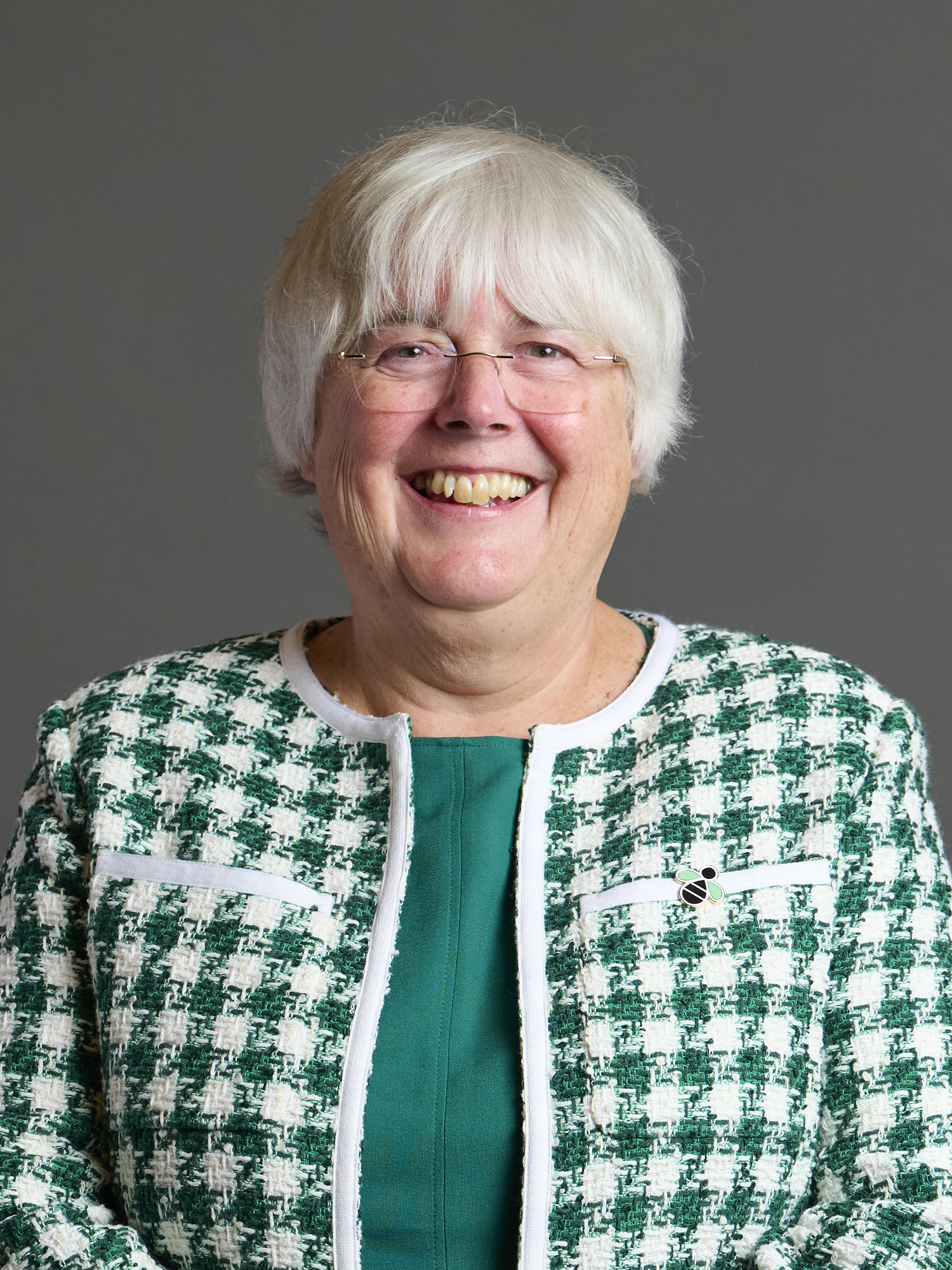
- Official portrait, 2024

Member of Parliament for Ely and East Cambridgeshire
- Incumbent
- Assumed office 4 July 2024
- Preceded by: Constituency established
- Majority: 495 (0.9%)

Personal details
- Born: Charlotte Kathryn Bourne Hilton; June 1958 (age 68)
- Party: Liberal Democrats
- Children: 2
- Education: University of Birmingham

Charlotte Kathryn Bourne Cane (née Hilton; born June 1958) is a British Liberal Democrat politician who has been the Member of Parliament for Ely and East Cambridgeshire since 2024.

== Early life and education ==
Charlotte Kathryn Bourne Hilton was born in June 1958 and moved around growing up as her father was in the army, while her mother was a teacher.

She was privately educated at St Helen's School, before studying ancient history and archaeology at the University of Birmingham, where she met her husband. The couple worked together as field archaeologists, but due to financial circumstances, Cane retrained as a chartered accountant.

At the time of the general election campaign, Cane had retired from her finance positions which had latterly been in the third sector.

== Political career ==
=== Local council ===
Cane was elected unopposed to East Cambridgeshire District Council in 1999 representing The Swaffhams, retaining her seat four years later. The following year she resigned her seat and the by-election resulted in a gain by the Conservatives.

By 2011, Cane had returned to Cambridgeshire politics, standing unsuccessfully for East Cambridgeshire District Council in The Swaffhams and coming second to the incumbent Conservative in a two-candidate election. She stood again in 2015, also coming second, of three candidates. This ward was abolished in 2019, and Cane stood successfully in Bottisham ward, topping the poll in a two-member seat. She successfully defended her council seat in 2023.

Cane continues to represent Bottisham ward on East Cambridgeshire District Council, and donates her monthly allowance of £691.43 directly to charity.

Cane twice stood unsuccessfully for Cambridgeshire County Council in Burwell ward in 2017 and 2021, coming second on each occasion, of four and three candidates respectively.

In November 2014, Cane joined Reach Parish Council. She stood down from this in the summer of 2024.

=== Parliamentary candidate ===
Cane first stood for election to Parliament in the 1987 general election as the Liberal candidate in Birmingham Selly Oak where she came third of four candidates with 15.4% of the vote. She stood again in the 2019 general election, as the Liberal Democrat candidate in Harlow coming in third of three candidates with 5.5% of the vote, enough to save the election deposit. She was elected as the member of Parliament for Ely and East Cambridgeshire in the 2024 general election. Cane narrowly defeated Lucy Frazer, Conservative MP for South East Cambridgeshire, becoming the first Liberal MP to represent Ely since Clement Freud in 1983.

=== Parliamentary career ===
On 28 October 2024, Cane became a member of the Public Administration and Constitutional Affairs Select Committee. On 6 November 2024, she made her maiden speech in the House of Commons.

In May 2025, Ms Cane launched 'Charlotte's Chippy Competition' in which local residents were asked to vote for their favourite chip shop in the constituency. In June 2025, she announced that Rumbles Fish Bar in Sutton was the winner. In July 2025, Ms Cane launched a Publicans' Network to help protect rural pubs in her constituency.

In February 2026, Cane had to apologise to the UK House of Commons for failing to declare a registered interest of £800 hospitality tickets from the Jockey Club when she tabled Written Questions about taxes on horserace gambling. She said "When I tabled these questions, I inadvertently failed to declare a relevant interest, the receipt of hospitality from the Jockey Club. This was a breach of the rules, and I apologise to the House for this error."

== Personal life ==
In 1994, Cane moved to Reach, Cambridgeshire, for an arts charity job, where she later raised her two children.

Parliament of the United Kingdom
New constituency	Member of Parliament for Ely and East Cambridgeshire; 2024–present	Incumbent
