= Aldreth =

Hamlet in Cambridgeshire, England

Coordinates: 52.34°N 00.12°E

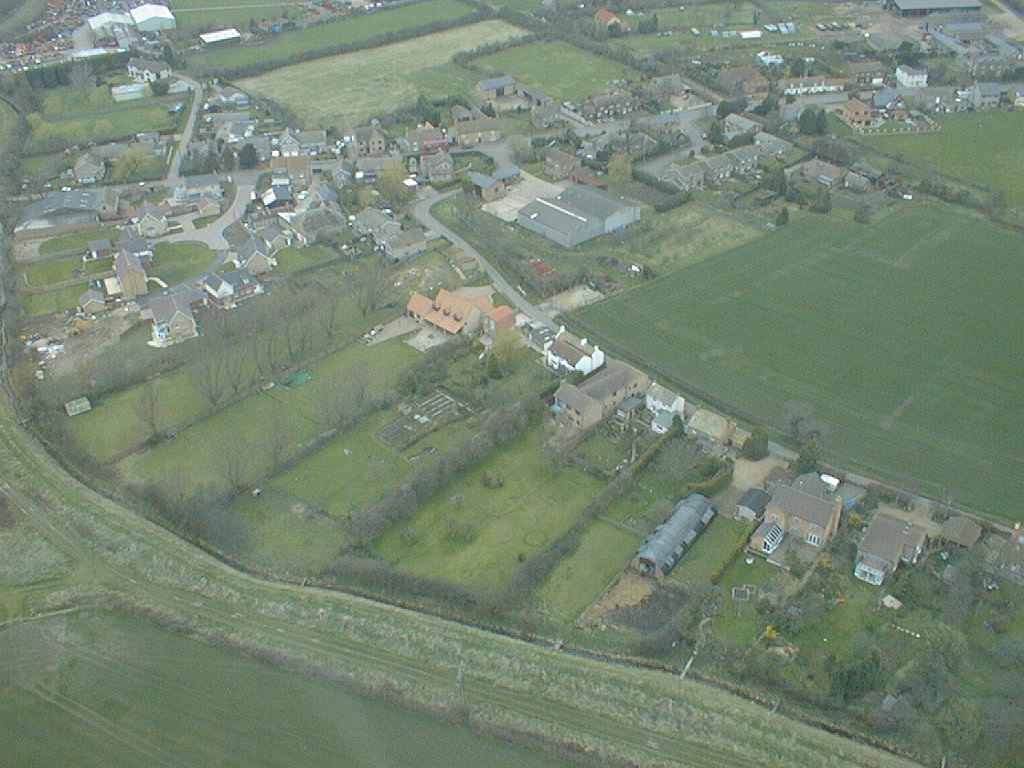
- Aerial view of Aldreth

- Location within Cambridgeshire
- OS grid reference: TL446735
  - London: 62 mi (100 km) S
- Civil parish: Haddenham
- District: East Cambridgeshire
- Shire county: Cambridgeshire
- Region: East
- Country: England
- Sovereign state: United Kingdom
- Post town: ELY
- Postcode district: CB6
- Dialling code: 01353
- Police: Cambridgeshire
- Fire: Cambridgeshire
- Ambulance: East of England
- UK Parliament: South East Cambridgeshire
- Website: ECDC

Aldreth is a hamlet in Cambridgeshire with about 260 residents (2001 census). It is located near the larger village of Haddenham (where the population is listed) and falls under the same Parish council. Aldreth is surrounded by fenland on all sides and is close to the River Great Ouse.

== History ==
=== Toponymy ===
The name "Aldreth" occurs as Alreheða in the 1170 Pipe rolls, and means "landing-place by the alders", from a combination of the Old English words for "alder" and "hythe". The name also occurs a number of times in the text of the 12th-century Liber Eliensis, as Alreheðe, with one variant as Alhereðe.

=== Battles ===
Aldreth may have been the site of two battles between Hereward the Wake (Anglo-Saxons) and William the Conqueror (Normans). Aldreth was one of three routes, or causeways, into the Isle of Ely at that time; Stuntney Causeway 2.25 miles (3.62 km) to the south-east, the Earith Causeway 10 miles (16 km) to the west-south-west and the Aldreth Causeway 7 miles (11 km) south-west of the Isle of Ely.

== Geography ==
Map showing Isle of Ely surrounded by water Joan Blaeu (1648) Regiones Inundatae

=== Geology ===
The village is on an east–west running boulder clay (middle-Pleistocene till) ridge sitting on a belt of mainly Jurassic Kimmerigian clays running south-west from The Wash. To the east is a north–south running belt of geologically more recent Upper-Cretaceous Lower Greensand capped by Lower-Cretaceous Gault Clay; the whole area is surrounded by even more recent fen deposits. To the west, again running north-east—south-west, is a scarp belt of middle-Jurassic sedimentary rocks including limestone and sandstone.

The flat fenland countryside around the village, typical for this part of the region, lies about 16 feet (5 m) above sea-level. The highest point in the village is 23 feet (7 m) above sea-level and the highest point in the area is 85 feet (26 m) at Ely, seven-mile (11 km) north-east. In contrast, the highest point in Cambridgeshire, 479 feet (146 m) above sea-level, is at Great Chishill, 21 miles (34 km) almost due south. Holme at nine feet (2.75 m) below sea-level is East Cambridgeshire's (and the United Kingdom's) lowest point, and is 18 miles (29 km) north-west.

== Community ==
Aldreth shares an annual village open day, Blossoms & Bygones, with neighbouring village Haddenham. The event, which includes tractor rides, vintage car and tractor displays, and open gardens, held its 40th anniversary in 2011 with a VE Day theme, with villagers dressed in 1940s costume.

== Bibliography ==
- Darby, H C (1974). The Medieval Fenland. Cambridge University Press. ISBN 0-7153-5919-3.
- Fairweather, Janet (2005). Liber Eliensis: a history of the Isle of Ely from the seventh century to the twelfth. The Boydell Press. p. 502. ISBN 1-84383-015-9.*
- Head, Vincent (1995). Hereward. Alan Sutton Publishing Inc. pp. 86. ISBN 0-7509-0807-6.
- Lethbridge, T.C. (1934). "Investigations of the Ancient Causeway in the Fen between Fordy and Little Thetford". Proceedings of the Cambridge Antiquarian Society. XXXV.
- Miller, S H; Rev. W D Sweeting (1895). De Gestis herwardi Saxonis. Geo. C. Caster, Market Place, Peterborough. Archived from the original on 21 January 2011.
