= Countess Free Church =

Church in Ely, Cambridgeshire, England

Coordinates: 52°24′3.82″N 0°15′44.35″E

Countess Free Church Ely
- Countess of Huntingdon Free Church Ely
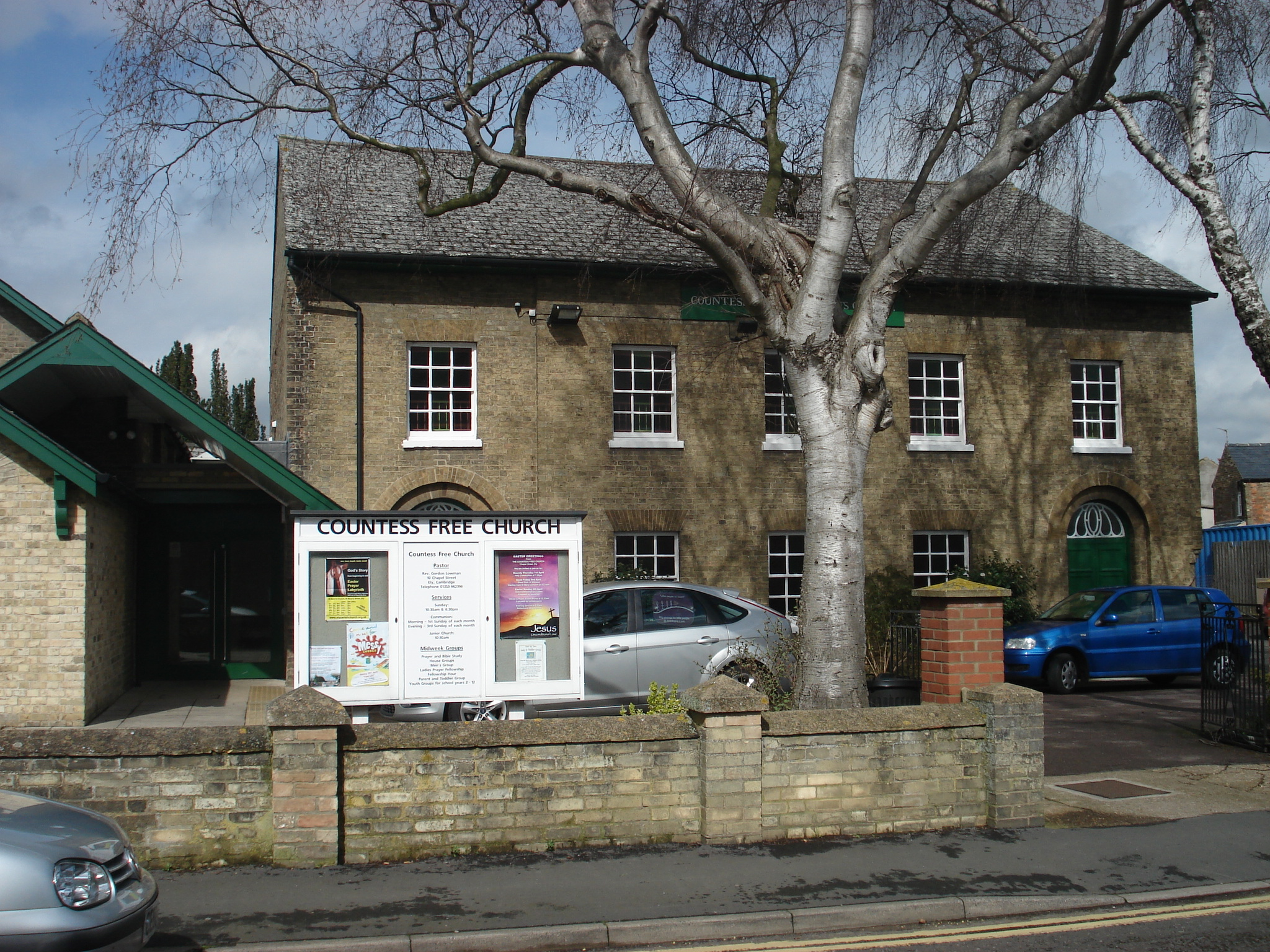
- Countess Free Church Ely
- Location: Ely, Cambridgeshire
- Country: England
- Denomination: Countess of Huntingdon Connexion
- Website: www.countessely.co.uk

History
- Founded: 1700s
- Founder: Countess of Huntingdon

Clergy
- Pastor: Satyajit Deodhar

The Countess Free Church is a church based in the centre of Ely, Cambridgeshire, which also holds events across the city. The church meets on a Sunday morning at 10.30am and also has activities and groups for people of all ages through the week, including a strong community focus by hosting meetings mid-week. The church buildings are located in Chapel Street, near Ely Cathedral.

== Mission and vision ==
The members understand themselves as "a church in mission across the city", with a tag-line of "Seeking to Worship, Seeking to Serve". The church functions as a Baptist church, practising believers baptism and a congregational governance model.

== History ==
The Countess of Huntingdon Free Church Ely was founded in 1785 by Selina Hastings, the Countess of Huntingdon. The church is part of the Countess of Huntingdon's Connexion, a small protestant denomination of just over 20 churches. During its history it has also been part of the historic Congregational Union. The congregation now is baptistic in nature, practising believer's baptism and having a congregational model of church governance. In 2019 the church also associated with the Eastern Baptist Association, a region of Baptists Together in the United Kingdom.

In recent years the church has been at the forefront of city-wide initiatives in partnership with other churches in the city, such as Ely Foodbank, the Ely CAP Debt Centre, and an in-school chaplaincy in the local secondary school. With the city growing, the church is active in considering new pioneer opportunities among the new housing estates.
