= Kennett, Cambridgeshire =

Village in Cambridgeshire, England

Coordinates: 52.2879°N 0.4843°E

Kennett
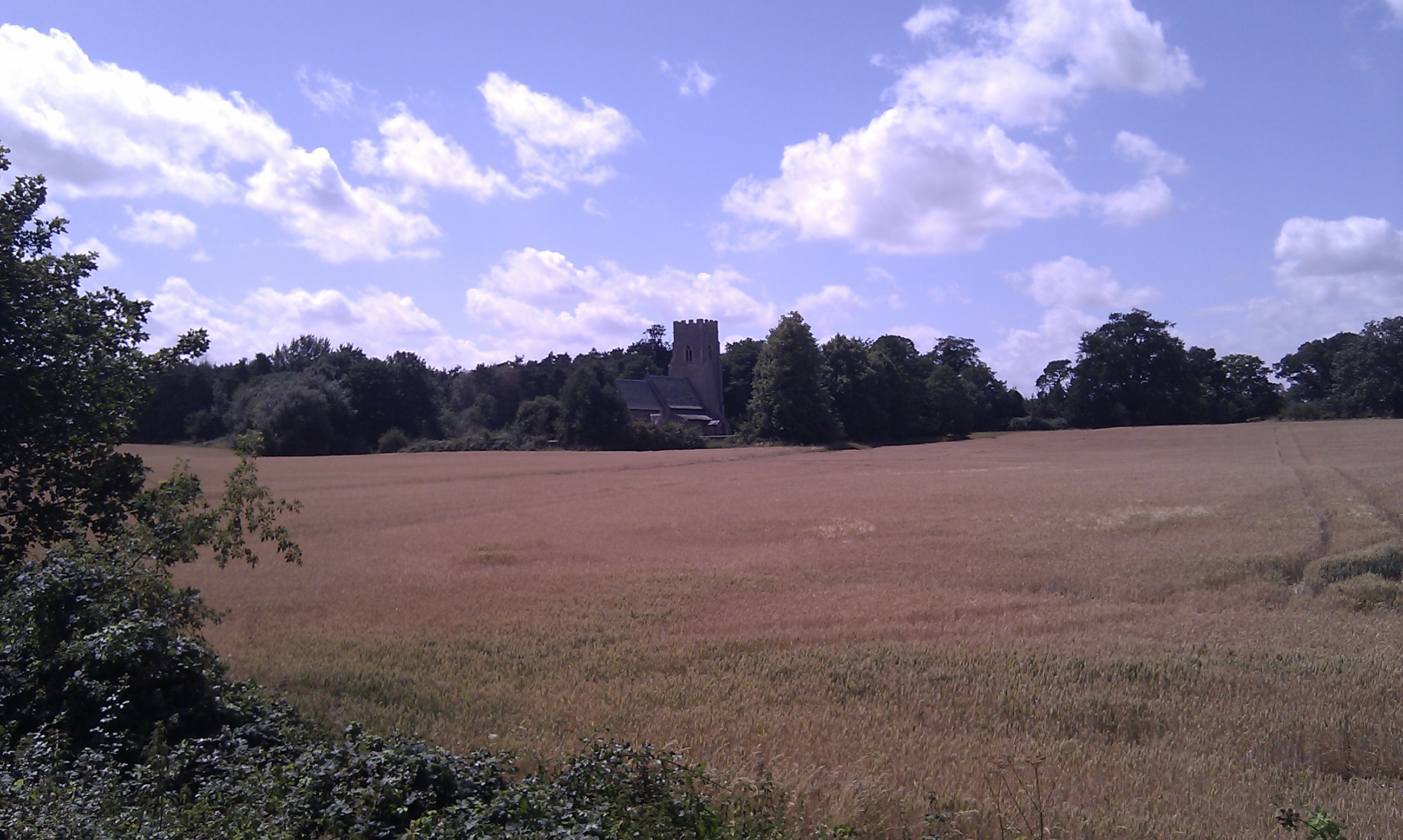
- View of St Nicholas' Church, Kennett

- Location within Cambridgeshire
- Population: 353 (2011)
- OS grid reference: TL6968
- District: East Cambridgeshire
- Shire county: Cambridgeshire
- Region: East
- Country: England
- Sovereign state: United Kingdom
- Post town: Newmarket
- Postcode district: CB8
- Dialling code: 01638
- Police: Cambridgeshire
- Fire: Cambridgeshire
- Ambulance: East of England

Kennett is a small village and civil parish at the very eastern tip of Cambridgeshire, England. Situated around 2.5 miles (4.0 km) north-east of Newmarket and 4 miles (6.4 km) north-west of Bury St Edmunds, it borders the county of Suffolk.

== History ==
The small parish of Kennett covers 1,431 acres (579 ha) at the easternmost point of the spur of Cambridgeshire that stretches into Suffolk. Listed as Chenet in the Domesday Book of 1086, the village is named after the river Kennett, a tributary of the River Lark. The origin of the river's name is unclear, but it is of Celtic origin perhaps partially derived from cwm meaning "summit".

The parish is roughly square in shape, and borders Suffolk to its east. The eastern border is largely made up of the meandering medieval course of the River Kennett, though the river has been straightened in sections since the border was defined. The border deviates to the east of the river for a kilometre or so, such that the land around Kennett Hall falls into the parish. The straight southern border with Suffolk follows the ancient Icknield Way. The relatively straight west and north borders are former field boundaries that separate it from Chippenham.

The earliest parts of the parish church of St Nicholas date to the 12th century. The river was forded at the south-east of the parish in around 1161 (from which the village of Kentford takes its name) and was navigable until at least the early 14th century, leading eventually to King's Lynn. A 13th century ferry across the Kennett was known as Kentfayre, and the Newmarket to Bury St Edmunds road had a bridge over the river added in around 1600 on what became a busy turnpike. Occasional flooding of the Kennett would damage the east of the parish, and a flood in 1968 destroyed the railway bridge at Kennett End. A pumping station was built just to the east of the church in 1977 to control flow.

A watermill in Kennett was granted to Sibton Abbey in 1163.

The railway reached the parish in 1854 and Kennett railway station was opened at the south-east of the parish. It closed to goods trains in 1965 and became unstaffed after 1967, though trains between Cambridge and Ipswich still stop there, the only stop between Newmarket and Bury St Edmunds. The Newmarket by-pass opened in the early 1970s (now the A14) and runs alongside the railway at the south of the parish.

The village's population increased from 90 in the 1790s to a peak of 208 in 1851 before dropping to around 160 by the end of the 19th century. Increasing to around 200 between 1930 and 1950 it remained steady at about 270 between 1961 and 1991. In 2001 it stood at 364.

Kennett Hall, on the site which served as the manor house from the 12th century, was built in around 1870 by William Godfrey. The house has Neo-Palladian windows on the three-bayed south-west front. In 1958 it was divided into flats, and rented by members of the American armed forces.

== Village life ==
The Bell Inn, the only pub in the parish, stands at the crossroads at Kennett End and dates from the 16th century. Village playing fields were opened to the east of Station Road in 1951 and are shared with Kentford in Suffolk.

A former quarry at the north west of the parish was bought in 1991 for use as a centre for off-road activities, claiming to own the largest collection of privately owned military vehicles in the country.
