= 2023 East Cambridgeshire District Council election =

2023 English local election

- 4 May 2023

All 28 seats to East Cambridgeshire District Council 15 seats needed for a majority

	First party	Second party	Third party
Leader	Anna Bailey	Lorna Dupré	Sue Austen
Party	Conservative	Liberal Democrats	Independent
Last election	15 seats, 41.9%	13 seats, 40.7%	0 seats, 1.9%
Seats before	16	10 (Note: Including one vacant seat at Ely East last held by Matthew Downey who was elected as a Liberal Democrat in 2019 but was removed from the party and subsequently disqualified from the council in March 2023 for non-attendance.)	2
Seats after	15	13	0
Seat change	Steady	Steady	Steady
- Winner of each seat
Leader before election
Anna Bailey
Conservative
Leader after election
Anna Bailey
Conservative

The 2023 East Cambridgeshire District Council election took place on 4 May, 2023, to elect all 28 members of East Cambridgeshire District Council in Cambridgeshire, England. The Conservative Party retained control of the Council.

== Overview ==
Prior to the election the council was under Conservative control. At the previous election in 2019 the Conservatives had won 15 seats and the Liberal Democrats had won 13 seats. A by-election and changes of allegiance between 2019 and 2022 meant that going into the election the Conservative held 16 seats and the Liberal Democrats 9 seats, with an independent group comprising two former Liberal Democrats. There was also one vacant seat.

Following the results, the council remained under Conservative control; the overall result in seat numbers was the same as that of 2019, with the Conservatives taking 15 seats and the Liberal Democrats 13 seats.

2023 East Cambridgeshire District Council election
Party	Seats	Change
Conservative Party	15	Steady
Liberal Democrats	13	Steady

In November 2024, Cllr Lay who represents Woodditton resigned from the Conservatives to join the newly formed Liberal Democrat and Independent Group. This put the Council on a tie 14-14 for councillors, but the Conservatives continued to run the Council on the casting vote of the chair. Cllr Denney who was elected as a Lib Dem in the Stretham by-election joined the Conservatives in June 2026 (having been in the 'Conservative and Independent group' for the previous two months). As a result, the Council returned to majority Conservative control.

== Election result ==
2023 East Cambridgeshire District Council election
Party	Candidates	Seats	Gains	Losses	Net gain/loss	Seats %	Votes %	Votes	+/−
Conservative	27	15	0	0	Steady	53.6	38.4	18,226	–3.5
Liberal Democrats	28	13	0	0	Steady	46.4	39.7	18,831	–1.0
Labour	28	0	0	0	Steady	0.0	17.9	8,489	+7.6
Independent	3	0	0	0	Steady	0.0	2.6	1,220	+0.7
Green	2	0	0	0	Steady	0.0	1.2	560	–3.5
UKIP	1	0	0	0	Steady	0.0	0.2	85	–0.3

== Ward results ==
The results for each ward were:

=== Bottisham ===
Bottisham
Party	Candidate	Votes	%	±%
Liberal Democrats	Charlotte Cane*	888	49.0	+2.5
Liberal Democrats	John Trapp*	831	45.8	+2.5
Conservative	Ruth Betson	625	34.5	+1.0
Conservative	Toby Huffer	562	31.0	+1.5
Labour	Steven O'Dell	260	14.3	+1.3
Labour	Mike Swift	196	10.8	−6.5
Green	Mark Slade	159	8.8	−1.2
Majority				
Turnout		1,813	40.3	
Liberal Democrats hold		Swing		
Liberal Democrats hold		Swing		

At the General Election on 4 July 2024, Councillor Cane was elected as MP of Ely and East Cambridgeshire. As of June 2026, she continues as a councillor on top of her parliamentary duties. One of a very small number of MPs who have chosen to continue in both roles.

=== Burwell ===
Burwell
Party	Candidate	Votes	%	±%
Conservative	David Brown*	827	48.4	+4.8
Conservative	Lavinia Edwards*	817	47.8	+9.3
Liberal Democrats	Catherine Wrench	468	27.4	±0.0
Labour	Liz Swift	424	24.8	+10.2
Liberal Democrats	James Forsyth	411	24.0	+3.0
Labour	Geraldine Tait	379	22.2	+9.3
Majority				
Turnout		1,710	34.8	
Conservative hold		Swing		
Conservative hold		Swing		

=== Downham ===
Downham
Party	Candidate	Votes	%	±%
Conservative	Anna Bailey*	598	57.4	+5.9
Liberal Democrats	Martha Zantides	333	32.0	−4.7
Labour	Lois Appleyard	110	10.6	N/A
Majority				
Turnout		1,041	42.6	
Conservative hold		Swing		

=== Ely East ===
Ely East
Party	Candidate	Votes	%	±%
Liberal Democrats	Mary Wade	942	52.2	+8.5
Liberal Democrats	Kathrin Holtzmann	855	47.5	+8.7
Conservative	Rachel Butler	665	36.9	−3.8
Conservative	Sana Sheikh	510	28.3	−7.7
Labour	Caoimhe Ni Dhonaill	270	15.0	+6.4
Labour	Daniel Rudderham	261	14.5	+6.0
Majority				
Turnout		1,801	40.1	
Liberal Democrats hold		Swing		
Liberal Democrats gain from Conservative		Swing		

=== Ely North ===
Ely North
Party	Candidate	Votes	%	±%
Liberal Democrats	Alison Whelan*	883	57.9	+8.2
Liberal Democrats	Chika Akinwale	841	55.1	+9.6
Conservative	Richard Hobbs	434	28.5	−6.0
Conservative	Tom Boucher	430	28.2	−6.2
Labour	Clem Butler	205	13.4	
Labour	Frank Danes	176	11.5	−3.5
Majority				
Turnout		1,525	39.9	
Liberal Democrats hold		Swing		
Liberal Democrats hold		Swing		

=== Ely West ===
Ely West
Party	Candidate	Votes	%	±%
Liberal Democrats	Christine Whelan*	1,405	44.0	−0.9
Liberal Democrats	Christine Colbert	1,324	41.5	−5.1
Liberal Democrats	Robert Pitt	1,272	39.9	−4.2
Labour	Rebecca Denness	848	26.6	+13.6
Conservative	David Ambrose Smith	831	26.1	−3.9
Conservative	Roderick Mair	809	25.4	−3.9
Conservative	Lawrence Whitworth	747	23.4	+0.1
Labour	Mark Hucker	718	22.5	+12.4
Labour	Adam Wilson	599	18.8	+8.8
Green	Pip Gardner	401	12.6	−4.6
No Description	Sue Austen*	282	8.8	−37.8
Majority				
Turnout		3,190	44.0	
Liberal Democrats hold		Swing		
Liberal Democrats hold		Swing		
Liberal Democrats hold		Swing		

Seats recorded as Liberal Democrat holds for comparison with 2019, but two of the three councillors in this ward had subsequently left the party and formed an independent group in 2020. One of them, Sue Austen, stood for re-election as an independent but was unsuccessful.

=== Fordham & Isleham ===
Fordham & Isleham
Party	Candidate	Votes	%	±%
Conservative	Julia Huffer*	858	58.3	+4.5
Conservative	Kelli Pettitt	764	51.9	+5.0
Liberal Democrats	Connor Docwra	396	26.9	+4.7
Liberal Democrats	Rupert Moss-Eccardt	302	20.5	+7.1
Labour	Simon Cull	262	17.8	+8.3
Labour	Mark Pithers	222	15.1	+5.9
Majority				
Turnout		1,472	28.7	
Conservative hold		Swing		
Conservative hold		Swing		

=== Haddenham ===
Haddenham
Party	Candidate	Votes	%	±%
Liberal Democrats	Gareth Wilson*	496	47.6	−3.3
Conservative	Steve Cheetham	431	41.4	+6.6
Labour	Lydia Hill	114	11.0	+4.5
Majority				
Turnout		1,041	39.1	
Liberal Democrats hold		Swing		

=== Littleport ===
Littleport
Party	Candidate	Votes	%	±%
Conservative	Christine Ambrose-Smith*	781	48.2	
Conservative	Martin Goodearl	729	45.0	
Conservative	David Miller	652	40.2	
Labour	Adam Cooley	523	32.3	
Labour	Chris Dorrington	507	31.3	
Labour	Hilary Noculak	489	30.2	
Liberal Democrats	Janet Porter	289	17.8	
Liberal Democrats	Rachel Winters	283	17.5	
Liberal Democrats	Stephen Newton	274	16.9	
Majority				
Turnout		1,621	22.4	
Conservative hold		Swing		
Conservative hold		Swing		
Conservative hold		Swing		

=== Soham North ===
Soham North
Party	Candidate	Votes	%	±%
Conservative	Mark Goldsack*	601	45.8	+3.2
Conservative	Keith Horgan	412	31.4	−6.1
Independent	Josh Schumann	396	30.2	N/A
Liberal Democrats	Alec Jones*	387	29.5	−15.5
Liberal Democrats	Sarah Marsh	363	27.7	−20.6
Labour	Kim Brady	150	11.4	+1.4
Labour	Chris Horne	130	9.9	+1.3
Majority				
Turnout		1,312	26.9	
Conservative gain from Liberal Democrats		Swing		
Conservative gain from Liberal Democrats		Swing		

Both seats are recorded as Conservative gains from Liberal Democrats to allow comparison with the 2019 result, but Mark Goldsack had earlier won his seat for the Conservatives in a by-election in 2021.

=== Soham South ===
Lucius Vellacott was 18 on the date of his election, making him the youngest District Councillor in the United Kingdom at the time.

Soham South
Party	Candidate	Votes	%	±%
Conservative	Ian Bovingdon*	591	50.3	+2.2
Conservative	Lucius Vellacott	517	44.0	−2.2
Liberal Democrats	Elizabeth Blaney	351	29.9	−3.6
Liberal Democrats	Kieran Park	296	25.2	−6.6
Labour	Jane Harris	252	21.4	+3.0
Labour	Louis Needs	205	17.4	+3.8
Majority		166		
Turnout		1,175	25.6	
Conservative hold		Swing		
Conservative hold		Swing		

=== Stretham ===
Stretham
Party	Candidate	Votes	%	±%
Liberal Democrats	Caroline Shepherd	1,063	42.2	+6.5
Conservative	Bill Hunt*	1,019	40.5	−7.0
Liberal Democrats	Pauline Wilson	909	36.1	+2.9
Conservative	William Thurston	821	32.6	−13.2
No Description	Doug Stuart	542	21.5	N/A
Labour	Molly Butler	253	10.0	−7.6
Labour	Sarah Perkins	208	8.3	−2.8
Majority				
Turnout		2,518	46.2	
Liberal Democrats gain from Conservative		Swing		
Conservative hold		Swing		

Cllr Shepherd resigned in late March 2025 triggering a by-election that took place in May 2025 and was held by the Lib Dems.

=== Sutton ===
Sutton
Party	Candidate	Votes	%	±%
Liberal Democrats	Lorna Dupre*	1,233	74.8	+4.9
Liberal Democrats	Mark Inskip*	1,003	60.9	+7.0
Conservative	Sarah Bradley	435	26.4	−4.9
Labour	Jack Allum	123	7.5	N/A
Labour	Dominic Myers	97	5.9	N/A
Majority				
Turnout		1,648	37.3	
Liberal Democrats hold		Swing		
Liberal Democrats hold		Swing		

=== Woodditton ===
Woodditton
Party	Candidate	Votes	%	±%
Conservative	Alan Sharp*	918	56.5	+3.8
Conservative	James Lay	842	51.8	+0.8
Liberal Democrats	Helen Barker	404	24.9	+5.8
Liberal Democrats	Lindsey Moss-Eccardt	329	20.2	+2.2
Labour	Sarah Fraser	283	17.4	+5.5
Labour	Jacqueline Lacey-Eresh	225	13.8	+3.1
UKIP	Richard Fullerton	85	5.2	−9.2
Majority				
Turnout		1,625	32.6	
Conservative hold		Swing		
Conservative hold		Swing		

In November 2024, James Lay resigned from the Conservative Party to sit as an independent although part of the, then newly established, Liberal Democrat and Independent group on the Council.

== By-elections ==
=== Ely West ===
Triggered by resignation of Liberal Democrat councillor Robert Pitt.

Ely West by-election, 18 April 2024
Party	Candidate	Votes	%	±%
Liberal Democrats	Ross Trent	1,125	47.9	10.6
Conservative	David Ambrose Smith	760	32.3	+10.3
Labour	Adam Wilson	466	19.8	−2.7
Majority		365	15.6	N/A
Turnout		2,374	33.3	−10.7
Liberal Democrats hold		Swing	+0.1	

=== Stretham ===
Triggered by resignation of Liberal Democrat councillor Caroline Shepherd.

Stretham By-Election 1 May 2025
Party	Candidate	Votes	%	±%
Liberal Democrats	Lee Denney	820	36.8	−5.4
Conservative	William Ralph Furness	655	29.4	−3.2
Reform	Ryan Coogan	526	23.6	N/A
Green	David Woricker	131	5.9	N/A
Labour	Mark Hucker	95	4.3	−5.7
Majority		165	7.4	
Turnout		2,230	39.18	
Liberal Democrats hold		Swing		

In April 2026, Cllr Denney left the Liberal Democrats and joined the Conservative and Independent Group on the Council In June 2026, Cllr Denney joined the Conservatives.
