= St Nicholas Church, Kennett =

Coordinates: 52.28698°N 0.49082°E

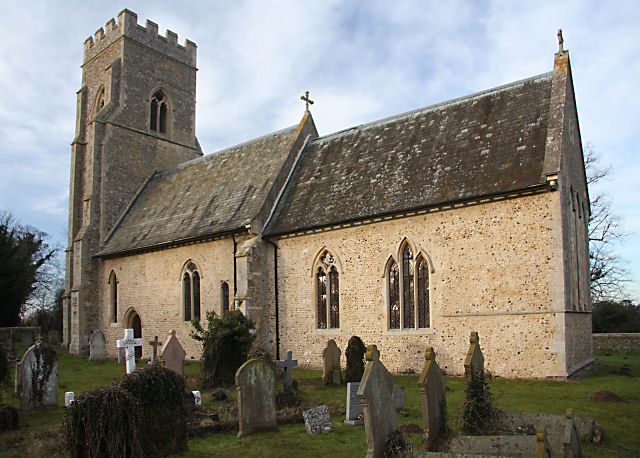
St Nicholas Church

St Nicholas Church is the parish church of the village of Kennett in east Cambridgeshire. It has been dedicated to St Nicholas since the 13th century. The building consists of a chancel and an aisled nave with north porch and west tower. The oldest parts of the building are the nave and north porch which were built in the 12th century, with the chancel dating from the 13th century. Its impressive 15th-century tower dominates the local landscape and contains three bells, including one from the 13th century.
