= Stetchworth =

Village in Cambridgeshire, England

Coordinates: 52.2°N 0.4°E

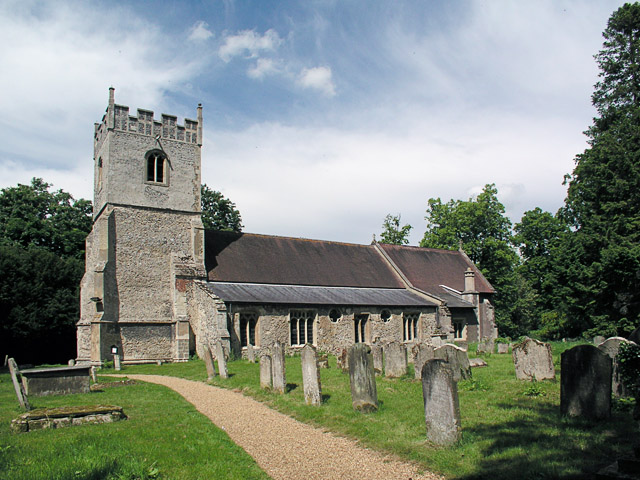
- Stetchworth, St Peter

- Location within Cambridgeshire
- Population: 704 (2011)
- OS grid reference: TL639585
- District: East Cambridgeshire
- Shire county: Cambridgeshire
- Region: East
- Country: England
- Sovereign state: United Kingdom
- Post town: NEWMARKET
- Postcode district: CB8
- Dialling code: 01638

Stetchworth is a small village and civil parish in East Cambridgeshire, England, 3 miles (5 km) to the south of the horse-racing centre of Newmarket and around 12 miles (19 km) east of Cambridge.

== History ==
The parish of Stetchworth is long and thin in shape, around six miles long and one mile wide and covering an area of 2,891 acres (1,170 ha). It stretches southeast from Newmarket Heath to the border with Suffolk. Its relatively straight north-east border with Burwell and Woodditton follows the Devil's Dyke to its southern end just west of Ditton Green, from where the border follows field boundaries. Its long western border with Dullingham also follows field boundaries, most of which also follow the course of the Stour Valley Path, a long-distance footpath. It also has a short border with Kirtling at the southeastern end and another with Swaffham Prior at its northwest edge.

Devil's Dyke (or Ditch), an Anglo-Saxon earthwork built between the Cambridgeshire villages of Reach and Wood Ditton, runs through Stetchworth. It consists of a ditch and a mound of earth which continues for over seven miles, and is a popular place for local walks. The Devils Dyke Morris Men dance along its length to end up at the 800-year-old Reach Fair on May Day. The relatively rare pasque flower grows along the dyke in the chalky soil.

The ancient trackway, Icknield Way, passes through the village. Much of its route, including in Stetchworth, is followed by the Icknield Way Path, a multi-user route for walkers, horse riders and off-road cyclists from Ivinghoe Beacon in Buckinghamshire to Knettishall Heath in Suffolk.

The village had 25 inhabitants at the time of the Domesday Book in 1086 when the parish was owned by Hardwin of Scales, the Abbot of Ely, and Count Alan. The Domesday Book also mentions that Stetchworth was "once a town".

The railway reached the parish when the Cambridge to Newmarket line was opened in 1848, though there is no station in Stetchworth. Dullingham railway station is just over a mile to the west of the village.

The National Stud partially falls within the parish boundaries, and the July Racecourse at Newmarket Racecourse finishes in the parish, running parallel to the Devil's Dyke.

Listed as Steuicheswrthe in around 1050 and Stiuicesuuorde in the Domesday Book of 1086, the name "Stetchworth" either means "enclosure amongst the tree-stumps" or "enclosure of a man called Styfic".

== Church ==
The parish church has been dedicated to St Peter since at least the 13th century, and is the oldest building in the village. There are records of a church in the village in the 12th century, but the earliest part of the present building is the chancel which dates from the 13th century. The nave dates from the 14th century and the west tower was extensively rebuilt in the 15th century.

There are bells in the tower dating from 1450 onwards, but they have not been used in recent years. The church boasts examples of early English graffiti (apparently carved into a pillar during a visit to Stetchworth by Queen Philippa) depicting a woman in an elaborate head-dress, and several animals.

The village also has a United Reformed Church that opened in 1963 on the site of the former Congregationalist Church.

== Village life ==
Stetchworth has one public house, The Marquis of Granby, which opened in 1937. Former pubs include The White Horse which opened opposite Church Lane in the first half of the 19th century, and rebuilt for the Earl of Ellesmere in 1905. It closed in the 1930s. The Live and Let Live opened opposite the school in 1890, but closed at some point between 1961 and 1973.

A school was opened in the village in the 1860s and attendance grew to a peak of 168 in 1905–6, falling to 33 by 1938. Older children were transferred to Bottisham Village College in 1947, and the primary school closed in 1990. Primary age pupils from Stetchworth now typically attend Kettlefields School which is just in Dullingham although it is closer to the centre of Stetchworth.

The Ellesmere Centre, on the Southern edge of the village, is a community centre, including a post office, and community store. It has a good range of sports facilities and a playground available.

== Stetchworth House and Stetchworth Park Stud ==
Stetchworth House was built in 1786 by Richard Eaton, father of Richard Jefferson Eaton and a Newmarket banker. It replaced the original Stetchworth manor house; it is Grade II listed. Stetchworth Park has its own private entrance to St Peter's Church.

In 1883, the estate passed to Francis Egerton, 3rd Earl of Ellesmere, who founded Stetchworth Park Stud. The stud was later run by Lt. Col. Douglas Gray, former Director of the National Stud in Newmarket. The GB Showjumping Team trained at Stetchworth Park before the 2012 Summer Olympics. In 2012, the estate was put up for sale, valued at over £11 million.
