= Isleham Hoard =

Bronze age British hoard

Coordinates: 52.343°N 0.411°E

The Isleham Hoard is a hoard of more than 6,500 pieces of worked and unworked bronze, dating from the Bronze Age, found in 1959 by William 'Bill' Houghton and his brother, Arthur, at Isleham, near Ely, in the English county of Cambridgeshire.

It is the largest Bronze Age hoard ever discovered in England and one of the finest. It consists in particular of swords, spear-heads, arrows, axes, palstaves, knives, daggers, armour, decorative equipment (in particular for horses) and many fragments of sheet bronze, all dating from the Wilburton-Wallington Phase of the late Bronze Age (about 1000 BCE). The swords show holes where rivets or studs held the wooden hilts in place.

The greater part of these objects have been entrusted to St Edmundsbury Borough Council Heritage Service and some are on display at West Stow Anglo-Saxon Village outside Bury St Edmunds, while other items are held by the Museum of Archaeology and Anthropology, University of Cambridge in Cambridge.

== See also ==
- List of hoards in Britain
