= Barcroft TV =

British news agency

- Formation: 2004; 22 years ago
- Headquarters: Hoxton, London, England, United Kingdom
- Official language: English
- Key people: Sam Barcroft
- Website: www.barcroft.tv

Barcroft TV is a British news agency. Sam Barcroft is the founder of the company. Barcroft Media founded itself as an alternative media news agency for weird and unusual news stories. British broadcaster Channel 4 had a controlling stake in Barcroft Media until November 2019 when it was sold to Total Film/SFX publisher Future plc. In 2020, Barcroft TV changed their channel name on YouTube to "truly", with a television channel of the same name due to be launched on the European version of Pluto TV in July 2020. Barcroft also expanded their truly brand to other online web online platforms, including Rumble.

== Shows on truly ==
- Born Different
- Brand New Me
- Hooked On The Look
- Love Don’t Judge
- Shake My Beauty
