= Fenland Survey =

The Fenland Survey was an intense archaeological survey of the Fenlands of England that took place between 1982 and 1989. During the survey, approximately 250,000 hectares (615,000 acres) of land was fieldwalked by four archaeologists in the interest of creating a comprehensive overview of the sites within the area.

More than two thousand sites and potential sites were found, including more than 300 Roman and Iron Age salt production locations.

The area of study included:
Cambridgeshire: 142,000 ha (351,000 acres)
Lincolnshire: 71,000 ha (175,000 acres)
Norfolk: 36,000 ha (89,000 acres)

The results of the survey were published in 1994.
