= George Barcroft =

English composer

George Barcroft (before 1574 – c.1610) was an English composer of church music.

Barcroft matriculated as a sizar of Trinity College, Cambridge on 12 December 1574, and proceeded to the degree of BA in 1577–78. He was appointed a minor canon and organist at Ely Cathedral in 1579. He was ordained priest at Peterborough on 30 August 1590. He was appointed vicar of Dullingham, Cambridgeshire in 1589. It is supposed that he died about 1610. Two anthems composed by him are extant, and to him has been ascribed a service in G. It appears, however, that this service was composed in 1532; probably by Thomas Barcroft, who is said to have been organist of Ely about 1535.
