= Congregational Union =

Congregational Union may refer to:

- American Congregational Union
- Congregational Union of Australia
- Congregational Union of England and Wales
- Guyana Congregational Union
- Congregational Union of Ireland
- Congregational Union of New Zealand
- Congregational Union of Scotland
