= Dullingham =

Village in Cambridgeshire, England

Coordinates: 52.1952°N 0.3838°E

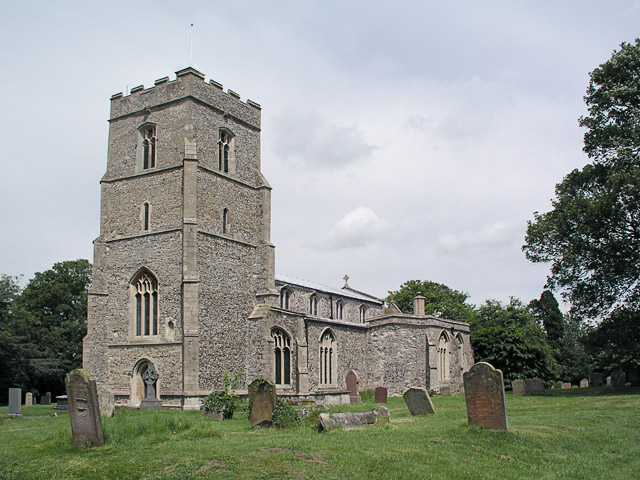
- The Parish Church of St Mary, Dullingham

- Location within Cambridgeshire
- Population: 767 (2011)
- OS grid reference: TL617584
- District: East Cambridgeshire
- Shire county: Cambridgeshire
- Region: East
- Country: England
- Sovereign state: United Kingdom
- Post town: NEWMARKET
- Postcode district: CB8
- Dialling code: 01638
- Police: Cambridgeshire
- Fire: Cambridgeshire
- Ambulance: East of England

Dullingham is a small village and civil parish in East Cambridgeshire, England. It is situated 4 miles (6 km) south of Newmarket and 14 miles (23 km) east of Cambridge.

== History ==
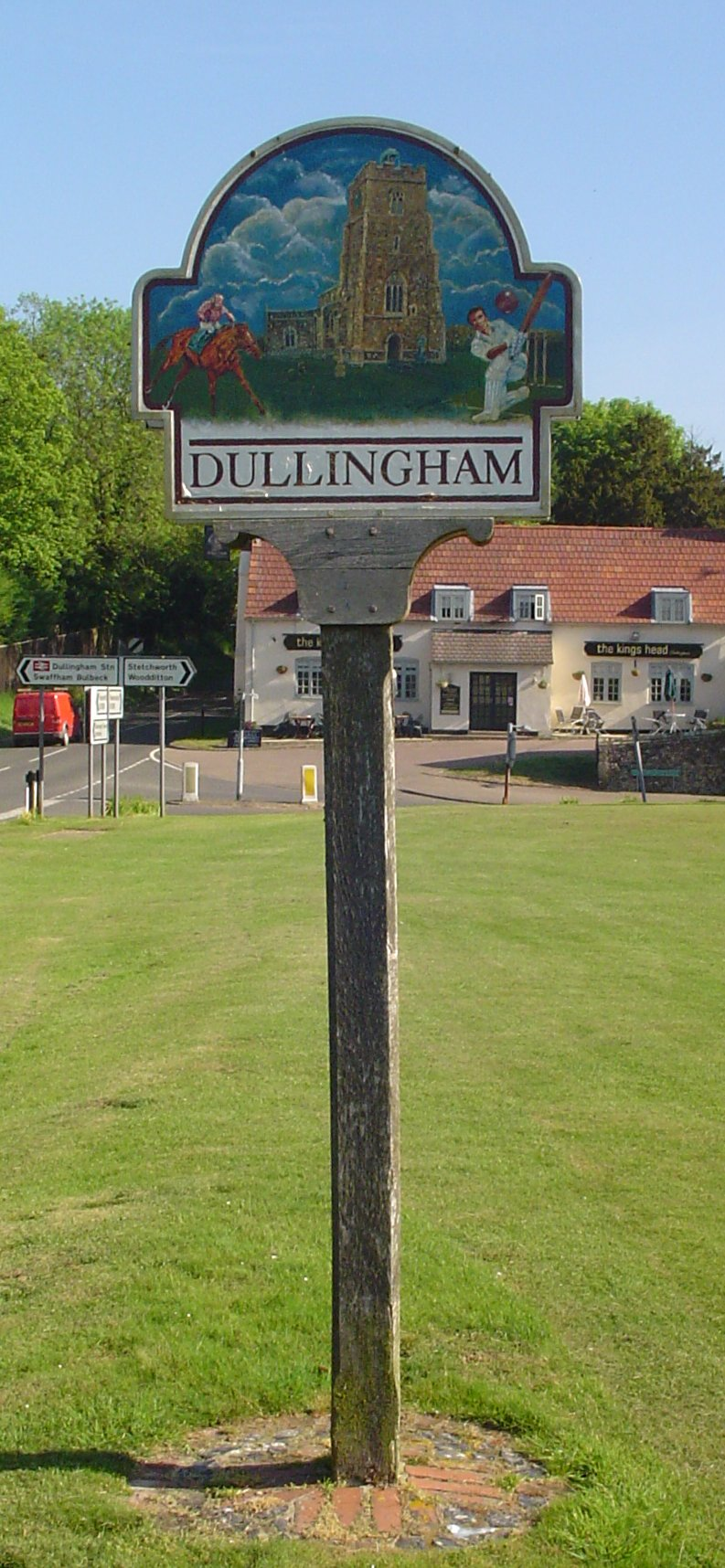
Village sign in Dullingham

The parish of Dullingham covers 3387 acres in a long thin irregular shape running from just north of the Cambridge to Newmarket road to the Suffolk border, and is bounded to the south west by Burrough Green and to the north east by Stetchworth. The ancient Icknield Way crosses the north west of the parish. The village seems to have existed for over 1,000 years. By the time of the Domesday Book in 1086, there were four land holdings and 46 peasants.

Listed as Dullingeham in the Domesday Book, the village's name means "homestead of the family or followers of a man called Dulla".

== Church ==
The church of St Mary the Virgin dates from the earliest records in the early 12th century. It consists of a chancel, aisled and clerestoried nave with north porch and south chapel, and west tower. The chancel is the earliest part of the present building, and was built in the 13th century. The tower was added in the 14th century, and the nave was rebuilt in the 15th century.

The composer George Barcroft was appointed vicar of Dullingham in 1589.

A Wesleyan Methodist chapel was opened in the village in 1826 and closed in the late 20th century.

== Village life ==
The village has had its own railway station since 1848. Dullingham railway station lies on the Cambridge branch of the Ipswich to Ely Line, and is about 1 mile (1.6 km) from the centre of Dullingham.

Dullingham currently has two pubs, The Boot and The King's Head, which closed in 2012 and again in 2022 for major refurbishments. It is situated in a 17th-century house and was in use as an alehouse in 1728. It belonged to the parish charity until 1931. The Boot, open since the mid-19th century stands on the village green. Several other former pubs were recorded in the 19th century, including the Rising Sun at Dullingham Ley that closed just after the Second World War, and the Royal Oak on Stony Street that closed in 1975.

Other notable buildings in Dullingham include Dullingham House, The Old Bakery, The Maltings, The Guildhall, The Workhouse, The Wesleyan Chapel and the Mission hall. In 1945 the Taylor family bought the former Oddfellows' hall (built c. 1925), and gave it as a village hall. It is known as the Sidney Taylor Hall.

Dullingham boasts active Cricket and Football teams, based on the sports ground on Stetchworth Road. Many other sports are also played on the Polo ground which is situated beyond the railway station on the road towards the hamlet of Six Mile Bottom.

Dullingham Primary School closed in the early 1990s, and pupils moved to a new school within Dullingham but on the border with Stetchworth that served both villages (Stetchworth School having closed at the same time).

Women in the Dullingham Villages ward had the second highest life expectancy at birth, 97 years, of any ward in England and Wales in 2016.
