= 2015 East Cambridgeshire District Council election =

2015 UK local government election

Results of the 2015 East Cambridgeshire District Council election

The 2015 East Cambridgeshire District Council election took place on 7 May 2015 to elect members of the East Cambridgeshire District Council in England. It was held on the same day as other local elections.

== Summary result ==
East Cambridgeshire District Council election, 2015
Party	Seats	Gains	Losses	Net gain/loss	Seats %	Votes %	Votes	+/−
Conservative	53	6	0	▲6		54.4	120,798	+5.9
Independent	3	0	3	▼3		9.4	20,888	-2.9
Labour	2	0	0	Steady		16.4	36,544	-5.0
Liberal Democrats	1	0	3	▼3		4.9	10,850	-9.5
UKIP	0	0	0			9.6	21,263	+8.2
Green	0	0	0	Steady		5.3	11,857	+3.3
