= 2019 East Cambridgeshire District Council election =

UK local government election

- 5 May 2019

All 28 seats to East Cambridgeshire District Council 15 seats needed for a majority

| | First party | Second party |
|---|---|---|
| Party | Conservative | Liberal Democrats |
| Last election | 36 seats, 54.4% | 2 seats, 14.4% |
| Seats won | 15 | 13 |
| Seat change | ▼21 | ▲11 |
| Popular vote | 18,328 | 17,814 |
| Percentage | 41.9% | 40.7% |
| Swing | ▼12.5% | ▲26.3% |
- Winner of each seat at the 2019 East Cambridgeshire District Council election
Council control before election
Conservative
Council control after election
Conservative

The 2019 East Cambridgeshire District Council election took place on 2 May 2019 to elect members of East Cambridgeshire District Council in England. This was on the same day as other local elections. The whole council was up for election on new boundaries. The Conservative Party retained control of the council.

== Results summary ==
2019 East Cambridgeshire District Council election
| Party | Candidates | Seats | Gains | Losses | Net gain/loss | Seats % | Votes % | Votes | +/− |
|---|---|---|---|---|---|---|---|---|---|
| Conservative | 28 | 15 | N/A | N/A | ▼21 | 53.6 | 41.9 | 18,328 | –12.5 |
| Liberal Democrats | 28 | 13 | N/A | N/A | ▲11 | 46.4 | 40.7 | 17,814 | +26.3 |
| Labour | 22 | 0 | N/A | N/A | Steady | 0.0 | 10.3 | 4,514 | –6.1 |
| Green | 6 | 0 | N/A | N/A | Steady | 0.0 | 4.7 | 2,037 | –0.6 |
| Independent | 3 | 0 | N/A | N/A | ▼1 | 0.0 | 1.9 | 848 | –7.5 |
| UKIP | 2 | 0 | N/A | N/A | Steady | 0.0 | 0.5 | 229 | –9.1 |

== Ward results ==
=== Bottisham ===
Bottisham
| Party | Candidate | Votes | % | ±% |
|---|---|---|---|---|
| Liberal Democrats | Charlotte Cane | 900 | 46.5 | |
| Liberal Democrats | John Trapp | 838 | 43.3 | |
| Conservative | Matthew Shuter* | 648 | 33.5 | |
| Conservative | Bradley Thurston | 571 | 29.5 | |
| Labour | Jane Goodland | 336 | 17.3 | |
| Labour | Steven O'Dell | 252 | 13.0 | |
| Green | Steve McGrady | 194 | 10.0 | |
| Majority | | 190 | | |
| Turnout | | 1,937 | 43.0 | |
| Liberal Democrats win (new seat) | | | | |
| Liberal Democrats win (new seat) | | | | |

=== Burwell ===
Burwell
| Party | Candidate | Votes | % | ±% |
|---|---|---|---|---|
| Conservative | David Brown* | 726 | 43.6 | |
| Conservative | Lavinia Edwards* | 642 | 38.5 | |
| Liberal Democrats | Catherine Wrench | 456 | 27.4 | |
| Liberal Democrats | Hebe Wrench | 350 | 21.0 | |
| Green | Floramay Waterhouse | 314 | 18.8 | |
| Labour | Liz Swift | 243 | 14.6 | |
| Labour | Hilary Sage | 215 | 12.9 | |
| UKIP | Martin Cubitt | 172 | 10.3 | |
| Majority | | 186 | | |
| Turnout | | 1,667 | 33.7 | |
| Conservative win (new seat) | | | | |
| Conservative win (new seat) | | | | |

=== Downham ===
Downham
| Party | Candidate | Votes | % | ±% |
|---|---|---|---|---|
| Conservative | Anna Bailey* | 493 | 51.5 | |
| Liberal Democrats | Doris Brenke | 352 | 36.7 | |
| Independent | Owen Winters | 113 | 11.8 | |
| Majority | | 141 | 14.8 | |
| Turnout | | 958 | 39.8 | |
| Conservative win (new seat) | | | | |

=== Ely East ===
Ely East
| Party | Candidate | Votes | % | ±% |
|---|---|---|---|---|
| Liberal Democrats | Matthew Downey | 780 | 43.7 | |
| Conservative | Lis Every* | 727 | 40.7 | |
| Liberal Democrats | Kevin Wilkins | 693 | 38.8 | |
| Conservative | Richard Hobbs* | 642 | 36.0 | |
| Green | Clive Semmens | 269 | 15.1 | |
| Labour | Isobel Morris | 153 | 8.6 | |
| Labour | Louise Moschetta | 152 | 8.5 | |
| Majority | | 34 | | |
| Turnout | | 1,785 | 39.3 | |
| Liberal Democrats win (new seat) | | | | |
| Conservative win (new seat) | | | | |

=== Ely North ===
Ely North
| Party | Candidate | Votes | % | ±% |
|---|---|---|---|---|
| Liberal Democrats | Alison Whelan | 591 | 49.7 | |
| Liberal Democrats | Simon Harries | 540 | 45.5 | |
| Conservative | Mike Rouse* | 410 | 34.5 | |
| Conservative | Sarah Bellow | 409 | 34.4 | |
| Labour | Rebecca Denness | 178 | 15.0 | |
| Labour | Edward Carlsson Browne | 168 | 14.1 | |
| Majority | | 130 | | |
| Turnout | | 1,188 | 38.2 | |
| Liberal Democrats win (new seat) | | | | |
| Liberal Democrats win (new seat) | | | | |

=== Ely West ===
Ely West
| Party | Candidate | Votes | % | ±% |
|---|---|---|---|---|
| Liberal Democrats | Sue Austen* | 1,380 | 46.6 | |
| Liberal Democrats | Christine Whelan* | 1,330 | 44.9 | |
| Liberal Democrats | Paola Trimarco | 1,308 | 44.1 | |
| Conservative | Helen Merrick | 890 | 30.0 | |
| Conservative | David Miller | 868 | 29.3 | |
| Conservative | Charlie Page | 692 | 23.3 | |
| Green | Gemma Bristow | 511 | 17.2 | |
| Labour | Sarah Fraser | 386 | 13.0 | |
| Independent | John Borland | 354 | 11.9 | |
| Labour | Mark Hucker | 299 | 10.1 | |
| Labour | Sarah Perkins | 297 | 10.0 | |
| Majority | | 418 | | |
| Turnout | | 2,964 | 38.9 | |
| Liberal Democrats win (new seat) | | | | |
| Liberal Democrats win (new seat) | | | | |
| Liberal Democrats win (new seat) | | | | |

=== Fordham & Isleham ===
Fordham & Isleham
| Party | Candidate | Votes | % | ±% |
|---|---|---|---|---|
| Conservative | Julia Huffer* | 743 | 53.8 | |
| Conservative | Joshua Schumann* | 647 | 46.9 | |
| Independent | Derrick Beckett* | 381 | 27.6 | |
| Liberal Democrats | Connor Docwra | 307 | 22.2 | |
| Liberal Democrats | Rupert Moss-Eccardt | 185 | 13.4 | |
| Labour | Chris Crickmar | 131 | 9.5 | |
| Labour | Jamie Goodland | 127 | 9.2 | |
| Majority | | 266 | | |
| Turnout | | 1,381 | 29.4 | |
| Conservative win (new seat) | | | | |
| Conservative win (new seat) | | | | |

=== Haddenham ===
Haddenham
| Party | Candidate | Votes | % | ±% |
|---|---|---|---|---|
| Liberal Democrats | Gareth Wilson | 524 | 50.9 | |
| Conservative | Stuart Smith* | 358 | 34.8 | |
| Green | Carly Juneau | 80 | 7.8 | |
| Labour | Lydia Hill | 67 | 6.5 | |
| Majority | | 166 | 16.1 | |
| Turnout | | 1,029 | 38.6 | |
| Liberal Democrats win (new seat) | | | | |

=== Littleport ===
Littleport
| Party | Candidate | Votes | % | ±% |
|---|---|---|---|---|
| Conservative | Christine Ambrose-Smith* | 790 | 51.1 | |
| Conservative | Jo Webber* | 782 | 50.6 | |
| Conservative | David Ambrose-Smith* | 754 | 48.8 | |
| Liberal Democrats | Siobhan Double | 476 | 30.8 | |
| Green | Lee Phillips | 475 | 30.7 | |
| Liberal Democrats | Lindsay Harris | 440 | 28.5 | |
| Liberal Democrats | Martyn Double | 403 | 26.1 | |
| Majority | | 278 | | |
| Turnout | | 1,545 | 22.1 | |
| Conservative win (new seat) | | | | |
| Conservative win (new seat) | | | | |
| Conservative win (new seat) | | | | |

=== Soham North ===
Soham North
| Party | Candidate | Votes | % | ±% |
|---|---|---|---|---|
| Liberal Democrats | Victoria Charlesworth | 599 | 48.3 | |
| Liberal Democrats | Alec Jones | 558 | 45.0 | |
| Conservative | Mark Goldsack* | 528 | 42.6 | |
| Conservative | Carol Sennitt* | 465 | 37.5 | |
| Labour | Chris Abbott | 124 | 10.0 | |
| Labour | Eileen Foley | 107 | 8.6 | |
| Majority | | 30 | | |
| Turnout | | 1,239 | 24.9 | |
| Liberal Democrats win (new seat) | | | | |
| Liberal Democrats win (new seat) | | | | |

=== Soham South ===
Soham South
| Party | Candidate | Votes | % | ±% |
|---|---|---|---|---|
| Conservative | Ian Bovingdon* | 507 | 48.1 | |
| Conservative | Dan Schumann* | 487 | 46.2 | |
| Liberal Democrats | Charles Warner | 353 | 33.5 | |
| Liberal Democrats | Joanna Burnett | 335 | 31.8 | |
| Labour | Lucy Frost | 194 | 18.4 | |
| Labour | Peter Tyson | 143 | 13.6 | |
| Majority | | 134 | | |
| Turnout | | 1,054 | 23.6 | |
| Conservative win (new seat) | | | | |
| Conservative win (new seat) | | | | |

=== Stretham ===
Stretham
| Party | Candidate | Votes | % | ±% |
|---|---|---|---|---|
| Conservative | Bill Hunt* | 964 | 47.5 | |
| Conservative | Lisa Stubbs* | 929 | 45.8 | |
| Liberal Democrats | Rosemary Westwell | 724 | 35.7 | |
| Liberal Democrats | Pauline Wilson | 676 | 33.3 | |
| Labour | Ian Allen | 357 | 17.6 | |
| Labour | Gill Spencer | 225 | 11.1 | |
| Majority | | 205 | | |
| Turnout | | 2,029 | 39.8 | |
| Conservative win (new seat) | | | | |
| Conservative win (new seat) | | | | |

=== Sutton ===
Sutton
| Party | Candidate | Votes | % | ±% |
|---|---|---|---|---|
| Liberal Democrats | Lorna Dupre* | 1,199 | 69.9 | |
| Liberal Democrats | Mark Inskip | 925 | 53.9 | |
| Conservative | Mike Bradley* | 536 | 31.3 | |
| Conservative | Beth Skelham | 466 | 27.2 | |
| Majority | | 389 | | |
| Turnout | | 1,715 | 39.1 | |
| Liberal Democrats win (new seat) | | | | |
| Liberal Democrats win (new seat) | | | | |

=== Woodditton ===
Woodditton
| Party | Candidate | Votes | % | ±% |
|---|---|---|---|---|
| Conservative | Alan Sharp* | 840 | 52.7 | |
| Conservative | Amy Starkey | 814 | 51.0 | |
| Liberal Democrats | Zoe Whelan | 305 | 19.1 | |
| Liberal Democrats | Christopher Ross | 287 | 18.0 | |
| UKIP | Richard Fullerton | 229 | 14.4 | |
| Labour | Teresa Cricmar | 190 | 11.9 | |
| Labour | Susan Smith | 170 | 10.7 | |
| Majority | | 535 | | |
| Turnout | | 1,595 | 30.8 | |
| Conservative win (new seat) | | | | |
| Conservative win (new seat) | | | | |

== By-elections ==
=== Soham North ===
Soham North: 23 September 2021
| Party | Candidate | Votes | % | ±% |
|---|---|---|---|---|
| Conservative | Mark Goldsack | 484 | 50.8 | +8.2 |
| Liberal Democrats | Anne Pallett | 369 | 38.8 | −9.5 |
| Labour | Sam Mathieson | 71 | 7.5 | −2.5 |
| Green | Andrew Cohen | 28 | 2.9 | New |
| Majority | | 115 | 12.0 | N/A |
| Turnout | | 952 | 19.2 | −5.7 |
| Conservative gain from Liberal Democrats | | Swing | ▲8.9 | |
