= Peter Barcroft =

English cricketer (1929–1977)

Personal information
- Full name: Peter Barcroft
- Born: 14 August 1929; Bacup, England
- Died: 26 August 1977 (aged 48); Bacup, England
- Batting: Right-handed
- Bowling: Leg-break

Domestic team information
- Years: Team
- 1956: Lancashire
- First-class debut: 26 May 1956 Lancashire v Glamorgan
- Last First-class: 9 June 1956 Lancashire v Essex

Career statistics
Competition	First-class
Matches	3
Runs scored	40
Batting average	13.33
100s/50s	0/0
Top score	29
Balls bowled	0
Wickets	0
Bowling average	0
5 wickets in innings	0
10 wickets in match	0
Best bowling	N/A
Catches/stumpings	1/–
- Source: CricketArchive, 30 November 2009

Peter Barcroft (14 August 1929 – 26 August 1977) was an English cricketer who played three first-class matches for Lancashire County Cricket Club in the 1956 season. He played for Lancashire's second-eleven between 1952 and 1961, as well as playing for Bacup Cricket Club between 1946 and 1965.
