= Wicken, Cambridgeshire =

Village in Cambridgeshire, England

Coordinates: 52.3126°N 0.2982°E

Wicken
- Village
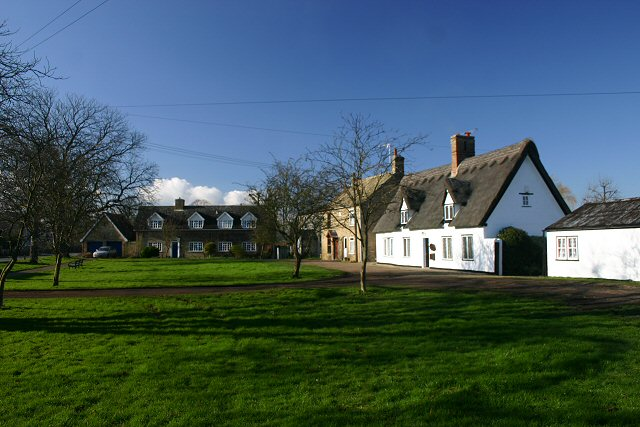
- Village Green

- Location within Cambridgeshire
- Population: 839 (2011 Census – including Upware)
- OS grid reference: TL568706
- District: East Cambridgeshire
- Shire county: Cambridgeshire
- Region: East
- Country: England
- Sovereign state: United Kingdom
- Post town: ELY
- Postcode district: CB7
- Dialling code: 01353
- Police: Cambridgeshire
- Fire: Cambridgeshire
- Ambulance: East of England

Wicken is a village near Soham in East Cambridgeshire, England. The village is on the edge of The Fens, 10 miles (16 kilometres) north east of Cambridge and 5 miles (8.0 kilometres) south of Ely. It is the site of Wicken Fen National Nature Reserve.

== Geography ==
Wicken parish consists principally of fenland covering 1,604 hectares (3,964 acres) in eastern Cambridgeshire. Its western border largely follows the course of the River Cam, and its southern border separating it from Burwell follows the winding Wicken Lode, which flows into Reach Lode just before the latter meets the Cam. A fenland waterway forms its eastern border with Soham parish. Since at least the 10th century the parish has also contained the hamlet of Upware in its isolated south-west corner on the Cam.

== History ==
East Cambridgeshire is known for its great quantity of archaeological findings from the Stone Age, the Bronze Age and the Iron Age. Of Wicken some Bronze Age activity is known as there are a few subsided barrows. Stone Age flint tools, Bronze Age weapons and Roman coinage have also been found in the parish as well as a few spears and other weapons from the Anglo-Saxon era.

Wicken's relative isolation and poverty has meant that several of the late medieval and early modern timber-framed houses survive. The medieval limestone cross which formerly stood on Cross Green was unburied and reinstated there in 1973.

Wicken was listed as Wicha in the Domesday Book and Wiken in around 1200. The name comes from an Old-English dative plural wícum meaning "the dwellings" or "the trading settlement".

Wicken also has the last twelve-sided smock mill still working in England, having been restored to full working order by a team of volunteers. The mill produces various grades and types of flour, milled using windpower driving two sets of burr crystal mill stones. The mill is open during the first weekend of every month and whenever the sails are turning. The mill is a Grade II* listed building.

The village was struck by a tornado on 23 November 1981, as part of the record-breaking nationwide tornado outbreak on that day.

== War memorial ==
Near the village green there is a memorial to the men of the area who died in the two World Wars. The name of Bailey is sadly prominent, with three in the First World War and one in the Second World War. There is also a mention of the 50th anniversary of the Women's Institute (1965).

== Church ==
The church is dedicated to Saint Laurence and is at the eastern end of the village. The newer centre of the village is now some distance away. The church has a nave with three bays, a north and south aisle, a tower that contains five bells, a chancel, a south porch and a large vestry on the north side of the tower. The present building is largely 14th century, with some 13th-century stonework.

Interred under the altar are Henry Cromwell, fourth son of Oliver Cromwell along with his wife, some of their children and an unidentified Elizabeth Cromwell.

The church is a Grade II* listed building.

== Village life ==
The village's only public house, The Maid's Head, so named since the mid-18th century, occupied a 15th-century thatched hall house, extended to the west in 1852, until it was hit by a fire in 1983. The building was rebuilt immediately to its original design. Former pubs include The Red Lion, recorded from the late 18th century until it closed in the 1930s, and the Black Horse at the top of Lode Lane, which closed by the 1950s. Upware retains the Five Miles from Anywhere Inn by the river.

The village faces the larger settlement of Soham across a flat expanse of agricultural land, once flooded, and still called Soham Mere.

== Recreation ground ==
The recreation ground is located on Chapel Lane and can be reached by navigating to the postcode CB75XZ. The recreation ground has a MUGA (Multi-use games area), football field with changing rooms and utilities, play equipment, recently added outdoor exercise equipment and zip-wire.

It hosts the popular annual Wicken Beer Festival which is traditionally held on the second Saturday in May of every year.

== See also ==
- List of places in Cambridgeshire
- Spinney Abbey
- East Cambridgeshire
- Wicken Fen
