= Stuntney =

Village in Cambridgeshire, England

Coordinates: 52.37°N 0.28°E

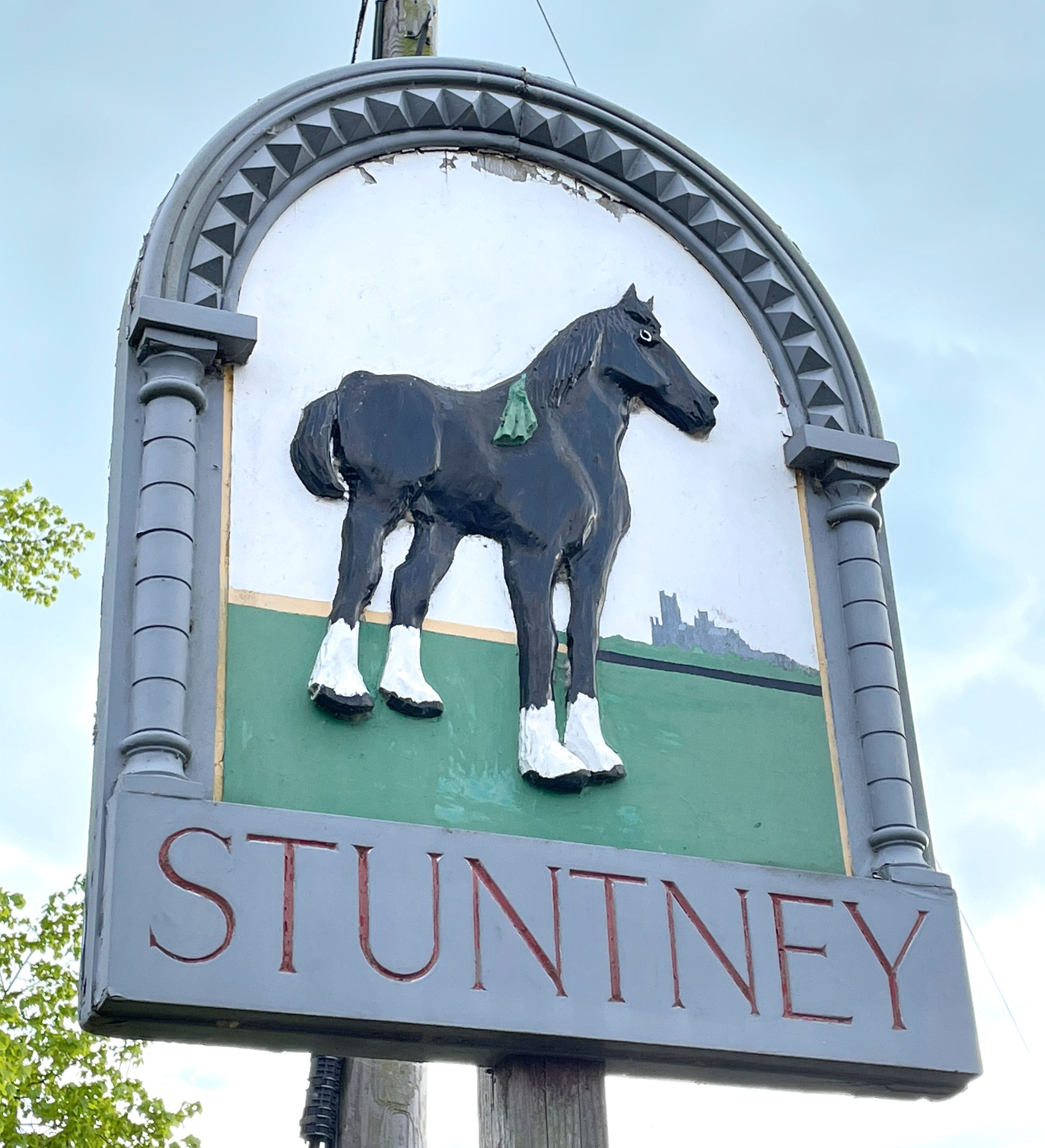

- Location within Cambridgeshire
- Population: 200 (2001)
- OS grid reference: TL554767
- District: East Cambridgeshire
- Shire county: Cambridgeshire
- Region: East
- Country: England
- Sovereign state: United Kingdom
- Post town: Ely
- Postcode district: CB7
- Dialling code: 01353
- Website: www.stuntneyvillage.org.uk

Stuntney is a village between Ely and Soham in East Cambridgeshire, England. It is just off the main road going from Newmarket to Ely, the A142.

== History ==
=== Early history ===
The earliest record of the village itself dates back to at least 1067, and the village of 'Stuntenei' is identified as an eel-fishing port in the Domesday Book of 1086. Medieval remains, including a large stone coffin, have been unearthed near Stuntney, showing that an early settlement existed near here. It was once surrounded by water, and a Bronze Age causeway connected Stuntney to the nearby cathedral town of Ely. Before the course of the River Great Ouse was straightened by the Bishops of Ely in the 12th century, it came right up the edge of the island on which the village stood, and docks existed on what is now agricultural land.

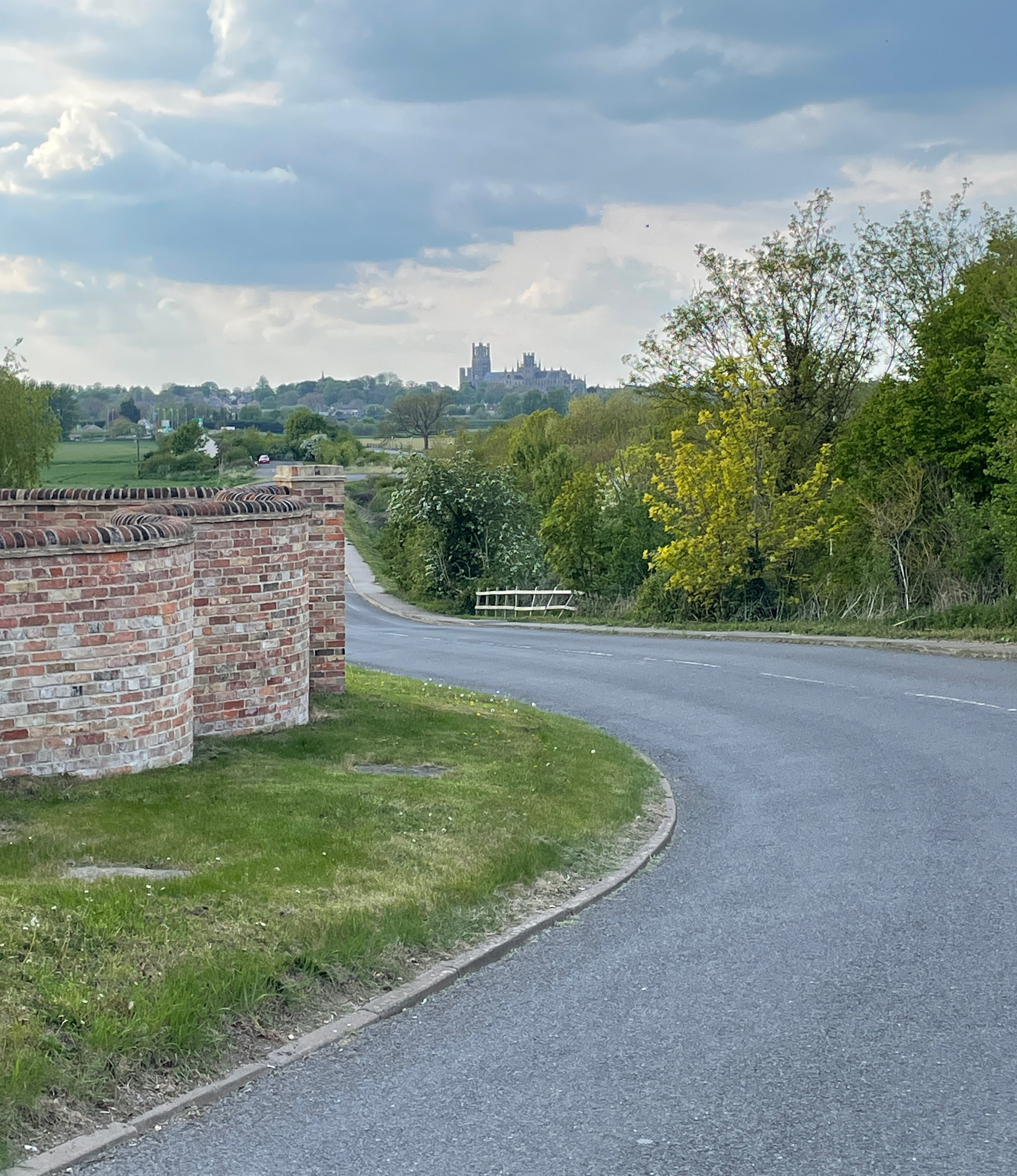
Ely Cathedral from the village at the top of the Stuntney causeway

=== Recent history ===
1868 saw a school built in Stuntney as the population rose to around 220 (which is similar to the current population); this school was expanded in 1958 and closed in 1983.

Church of the Holy Cross. The church in Stuntney, which dates back to 1876, was built on the site of a previous Norman Church, which was demolished due to its unsafe structure. All that remains of the Norman church are three archways, one part of the present entrance. The 1876 church was also rebuilt, again for safety reasons, the second restoration taking place in 1903 when most of the nave was rebuilt.

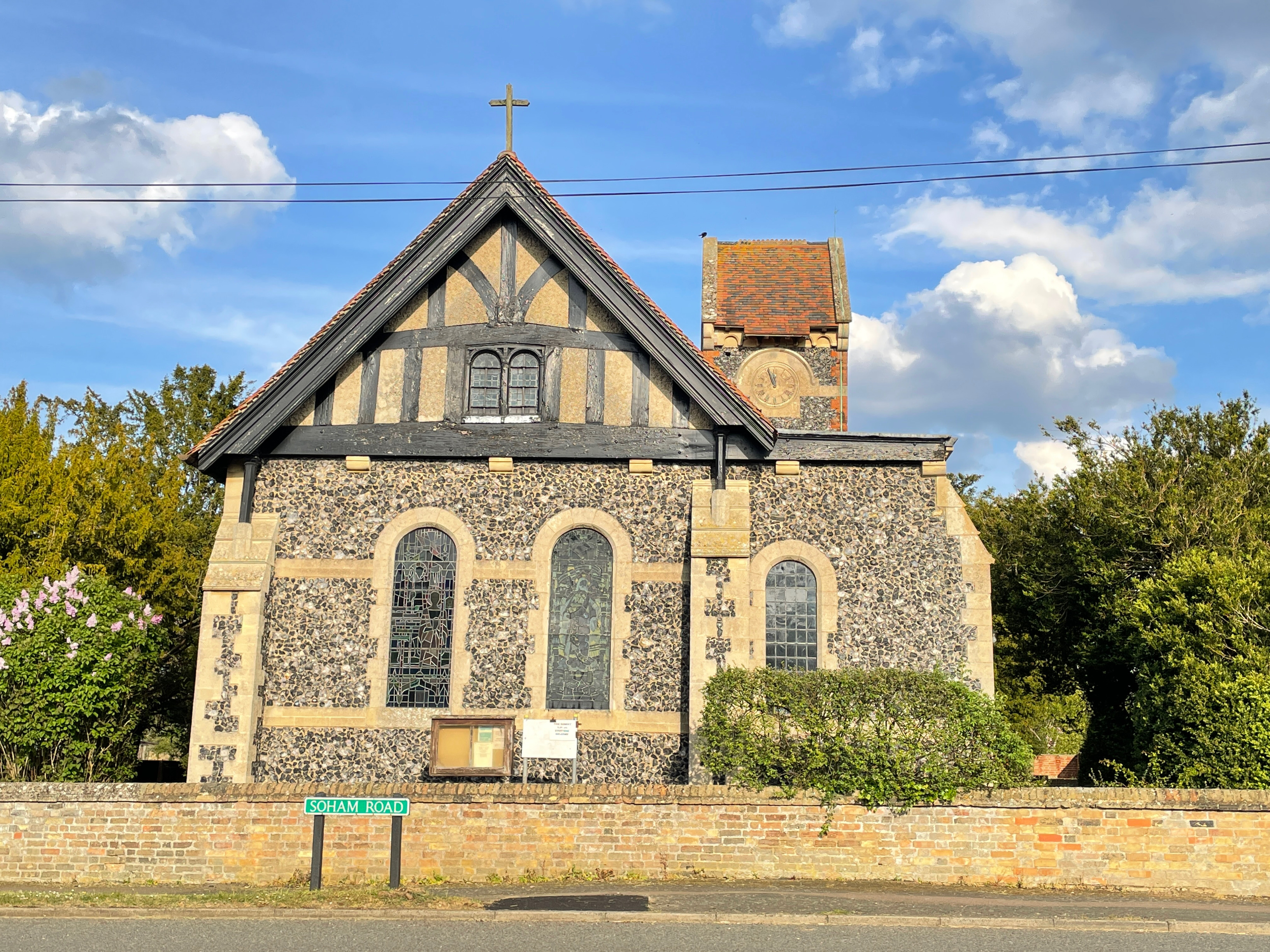
Holy Cross church

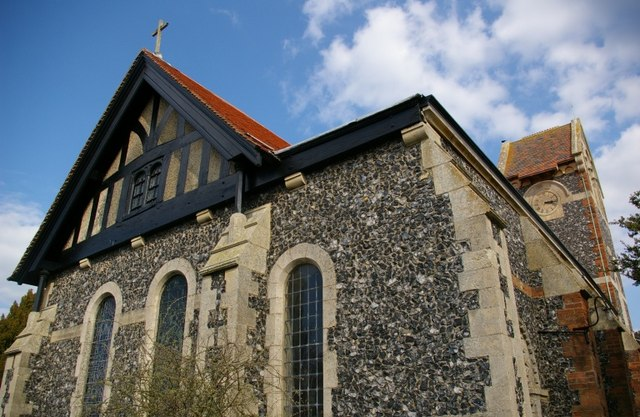
Close-up of church

In the village's history there have also been a shop, which closed in 1991, and two public houses, which closed to become private residences in the late 1900s. Perhaps the greatest change in village life was the construction in 1986 of a highway bypass, which took traffic between Ely and Newmarket around the village rather than through it. Into the early 2000s, Shire horses were kept in the village; traditionally, these horses were used to work the land, but when machinery took over in the 1970s, the horses were kept for breeding purposes.

== Village today ==
Although the village no longer has a school, a shop or a pub, the Stuntney Social Club provides refreshments for members and guests. Stuntney Church of the Holy Cross is a Grade II* listed building and holds regular services.

The majority of the 60 houses are located across the three main roads in the village; some houses in Quanea and Nornea also belong to the village. Cole Ambrose Ltd, who have been involved in agriculture in the village since the 1600s, are located in Harlocks Farm, Stuntney.

John Harding, the novelist, was born here in 1951.

== Archaeology ==
The region between Devil's Dyke and the line between Littleport and Shippea Hill shows a remarkable amount of archaeological findings of the Stone Age, the Bronze Age and the Iron Age.
