= East Cambridgeshire =

Coordinates: 52.387°N 0.294°E

East Cambridgeshire District
- Non-metropolitan district
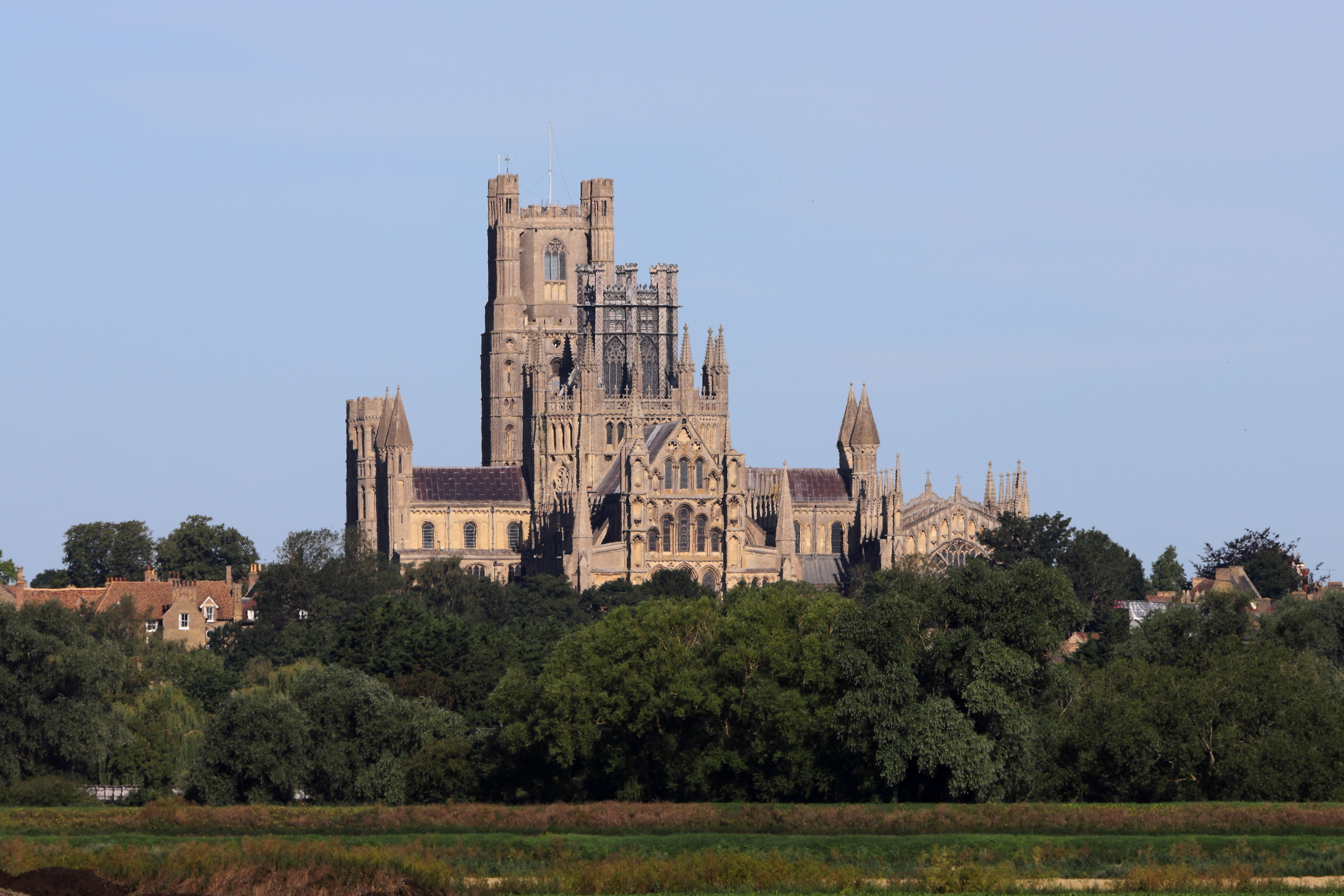
- Ely Cathedral

- East Cambridgeshire shown within Cambridgeshire
- Sovereign state: United Kingdom
- Constituent country: England
- Region: East of England
- Non-metropolitan county: Cambridgeshire
- Status: Non-metropolitan district
- Admin HQ: Ely
- Incorporated: 1 April 1974

Government
  - Type: Non-metropolitan district council
  - Body: East Cambridgeshire District Council
  - Leadership: Alternative – Sec. 31 (Conservative)
  - MP: Charlotte Cane

Area
  - Total: 251 sq mi (651 km^{2})
  - Rank: 53rd (of 296)

Population (2024)
  - Total: 92,906
  - Rank: 261st (of 296)
  - Density: 370/sq mi (143/km^{2})

Ethnicity (2021)
  - Ethnic groups: List: 94.5% White; 2.1% Mixed; 1.9% Asian; 0.8% Black; 0.7% other

Religion (2021)
  - Religion: List: 48.5% Christianity; 42.9% no religion; 8% other; 0.6% Islam
- Time zone: UTC0 (GMT)
  - Summer (DST): UTC+1 (BST)
- ONS code: 12UC (ONS); E07000009 (GSS)
- OS grid reference: TL535799

East Cambridgeshire (locally known as East Cambs) is a local government district in Cambridgeshire, England. Its council is based in the cathedral city of Ely. The district also contains the towns of Littleport and Soham and surrounding rural areas, including parts of the Fens.

Since 2017 the district has been a constituent member of the Cambridgeshire and Peterborough Combined Authority, led by the directly elected Mayor of Cambridgeshire and Peterborough.

The neighbouring districts are South Cambridgeshire, Huntingdonshire, Fenland, King's Lynn and West Norfolk and West Suffolk.

== History ==
The district was formed on 1 April 1974 under the Local Government Act 1972. The new district covered the area of three former districts, which were all abolished at the same time:

- Ely Rural District
- Ely Urban District
- Newmarket Rural District

The new district was named East Cambridgeshire, reflecting its position within the wider county.

== Governance ==
East Cambridgeshire District Council

Type
- Type: Non-metropolitan district

Leadership
- Chair: Kelli Pettitt, Conservative since 22 May 2025
- Leader: Anna Bailey, Conservative since 30 May 2019
- Chief Executive: Emma Grima since 1 January 2026

Structure
- Graph of the party split among 28 seats.
- Political groups: Administration (15) Conservative (15) Opposition (13) Liberal Democrats (12) Independent (1)

Elections
- Last election: 4 May 2023
- Next election: 6 May 2027

Meeting place
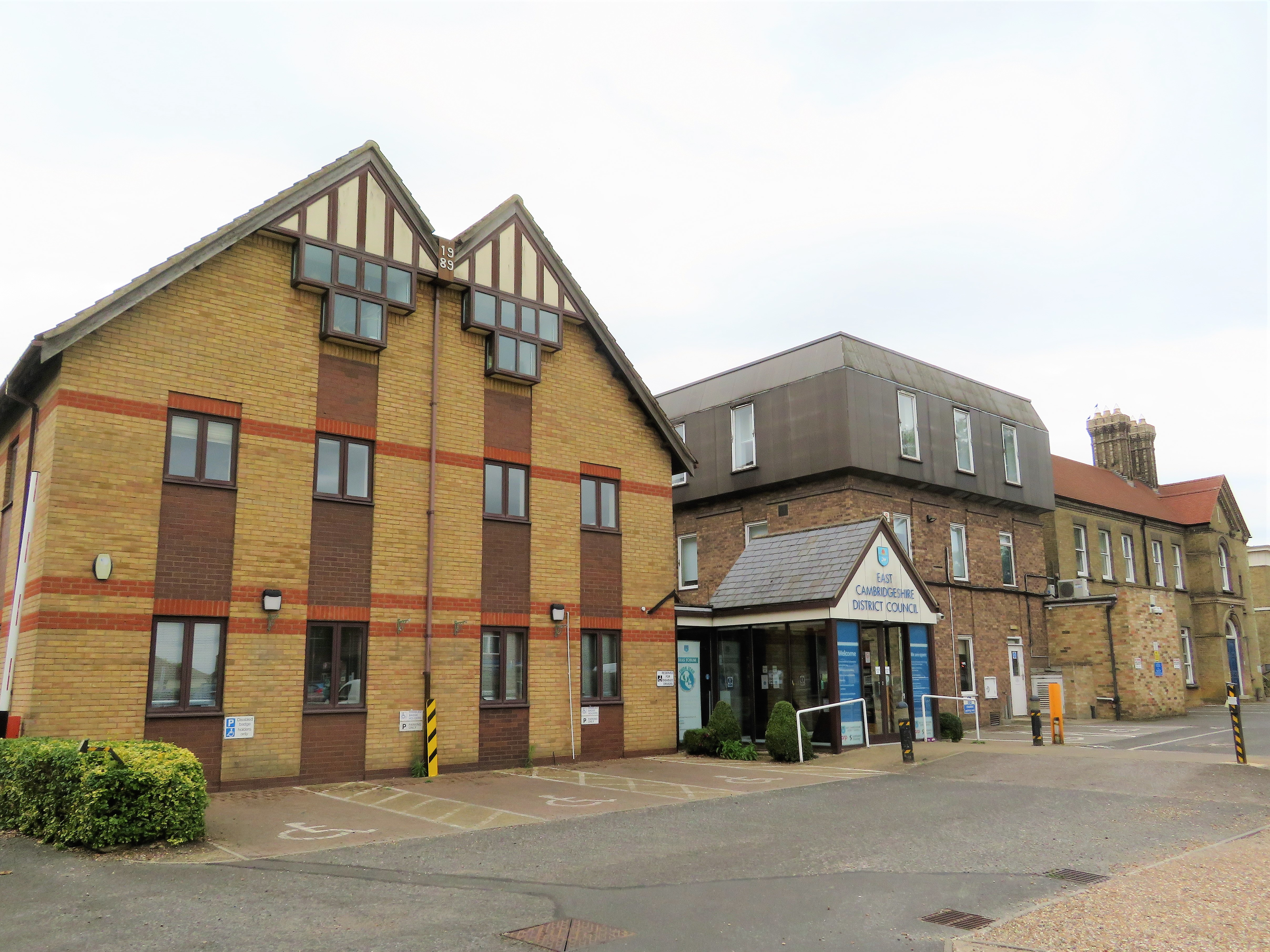
- The Grange, Nutholt Lane, Ely, CB7 4EE

Website
- www.eastcambs.gov.uk

East Cambridgeshire District Council provides district-level services. County-level services are provided by Cambridgeshire County Council. The whole district is also covered by civil parishes, which form a third tier of local government.

=== Political control ===
The Conservatives were elected with a majority of the seats at the 2023 election. The council temporarily came under no overall control following a change in allegiance in August 2024, with the Conservative administration relying on the casting vote of the Chair, but returned to a Conservative majority in June 2026 following a councillor leaving the Liberal Democrats and subsequently joining the Conservative Group.

The opposition Liberal Democrats and the Independent councillor have sat together as the Liberal Democrat and Independent Group since November 2024.

The first election to the council was held in 1973, initially operating as a shadow authority alongside the outgoing authorities until the new arrangements came into effect on 1 April 1974. Political control of the council since 1974 has been as follows:

Party in control	Years
Independent	1974–1999
Liberal Democrats	1999–2003
No overall control	2003–2007
Conservative	2007–2024
No overall control	2024–2026
Conservative	2026-present

=== Leadership ===
The leaders of the council since 2011 have been:

Councillor	Party	From	To
Fred Brown	Conservative		May 2011
Peter Moakes	Conservative	May 2011	May 2013
James Palmer	Conservative	May 2013	May 2017
Charles Roberts	Conservative	May 2017	May 2019
Anna Bailey	Conservative	30 May 2019	

=== Composition ===
Following the 2023 election, two by-elections and two changes of allegiance, the composition of the council is:

Party	Councillors
Conservative	15
Liberal Democrats	12
Independent	1
Total	28

The next election is due on 6 May 2027.

=== Elections ===
Since the last full review of boundaries in 2019, the council has comprised 28 councillors, representing 14 wards. Elections are held every four years, subject to Local Government Reorganisation.

=== Premises ===
The council is based at The Grange on Nutholt Lane in Ely. The building was originally a large Victorian house and it served as a maternity hospital from the 1940s until the 1970s. The building was acquired around the time East Cambridgeshire was created in 1974 and converted to offices. Several large extensions have since been added.

== Archaeology ==
The Fenland Survey of archaeological finds carried out in the 1980s mentions an enumeration of findings made between 1884 and 1994 in the region to the north of Devil's Dyke and Cambridge, from the Stone Age, the Bronze Age and the Iron Age (the region south of Devil's Dyke is not yet included in the survey). By far the greatest quantities of bronze objects found in England were discovered in East Cambridgeshire.

The most important Bronze Age finds were discovered in Isleham (more than 6500 pieces), Stuntney, Soham, Wicken, Chippenham, Coveney, Mepal and Wilburton. These findings include swords, spear-heads, arrows, axes, palstaves, knives, daggers, rapiers, armour, decorative equipment (in particular for horses) and many fragments of sheet bronze. The greater part of these objects have been entrusted to the Moyse's Hall Museum in Bury St Edmunds while other items are in the University of Cambridge Museum of Archaeology and Anthropology in Cambridge. Other finds include traces of cremations and barrows, golden torques, an extensive ditch system and a wooden track-way between Fordey Farm (Barway) and Little Thetford. Bronze razors have also been found and it is well known that Celts shaved their cheeks.

== Parishes ==
The whole district is divided into civil parishes. The parish of Ely holds city status, and the parish councils for Soham and Littleport take the style "town council".

== Settlements in East Cambridgeshire ==
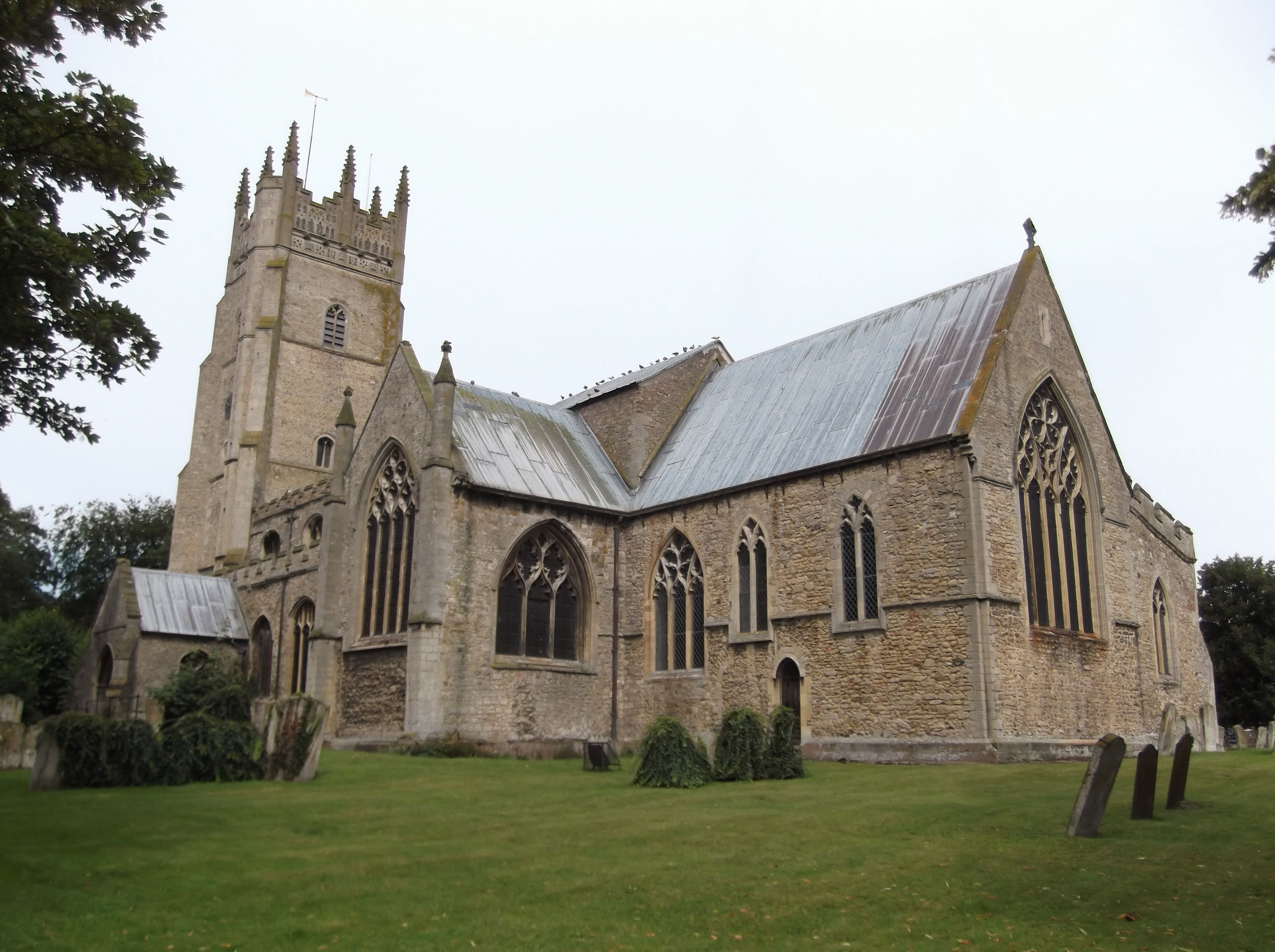
Soham, one of the district's towns.

- Aldreth
- Ashley
- Barway
- Bottisham
- Brinkley
- Burwell
- Chettisham
- Cheveley
- Chippenham
- Coveney
- Dullingham
- Ely (City)
- Fordham
- Haddenham
- Isleham
- Little Downham
- Little Thetford
- Littleport
- Lode
- Longmeadow
- Mepal
- Prickwillow
- Pymoor
- Queen Adelaide
- Reach
- Soham (Town)
- Stetchworth
- Stretham
- Stuntney
- Sutton
- Swaffham Bulbeck
- Swaffham Prior
- Upware
- Wicken
- Wilburton
- Witcham
- Witchford
- Woodditton

== See also ==
- East Cambridgeshire local elections
- Ely and East Cambridgeshire (UK Parliament constituency)
- Isleham Hoard
- Mereham
