= Haddenham, Cambridgeshire =

Village in Cambridgeshire, England

Coordinates: 52.358°N 0.149°E

Haddenham
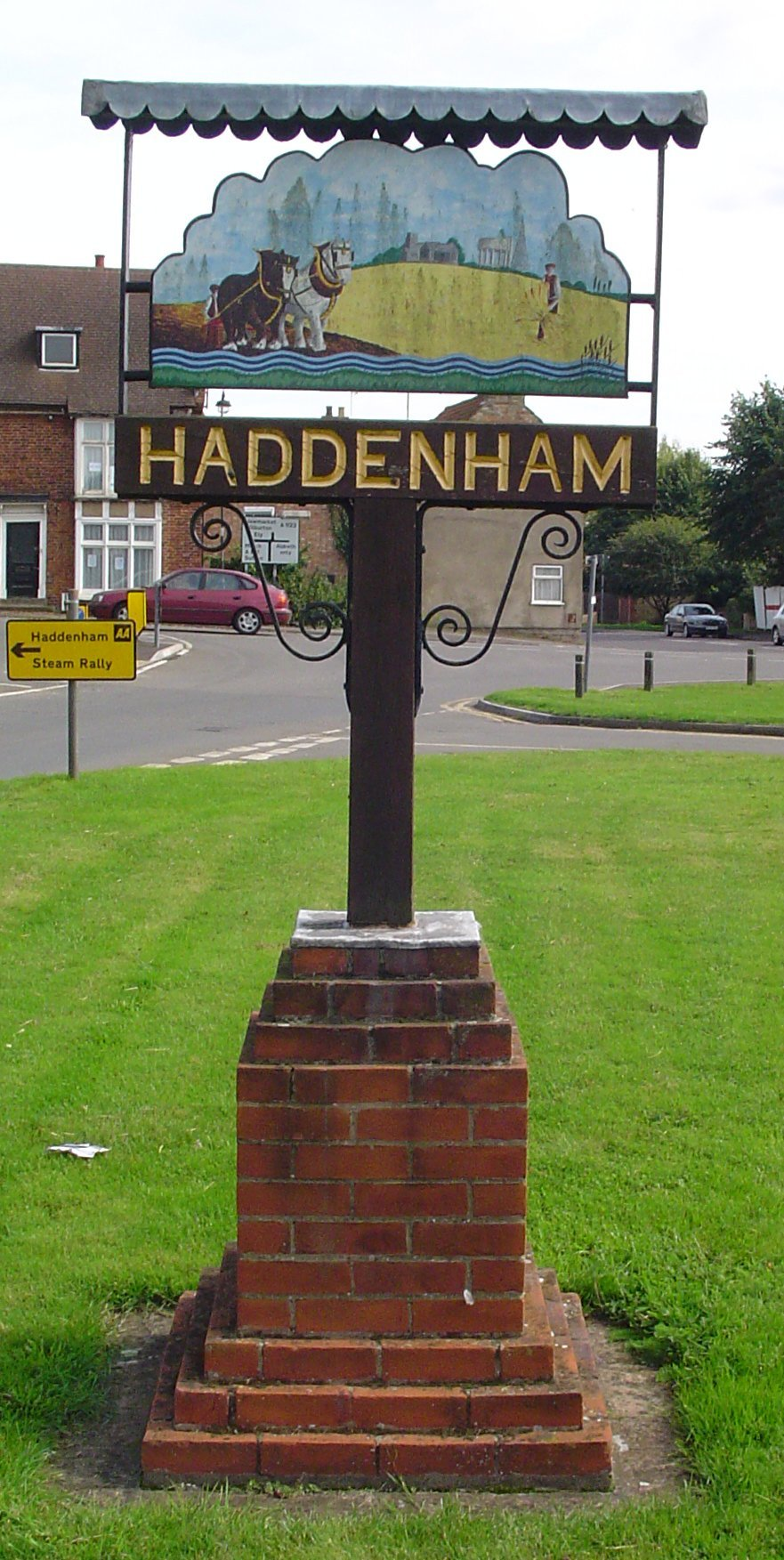
- Haddenham village sign

- Location within Cambridgeshire
- Population: 3,438
- OS grid reference: TL464755
- Shire county: Cambridgeshire
- Region: East
- Country: England
- Sovereign state: United Kingdom
- Post town: ELY
- Postcode district: CB6
- Website: East Cambs District Council

Haddenham is a village and civil parish in Cambridgeshire, England. The 2011 census reported a population of 3,344, a figure which includes the hamlet of Aldreth. In the 2021 census, Haddenham had a reported population of 3,438, also including the hamlet of Aldreth.

== History ==
The Archaeology Data Service reports Iron Age features such as ditches and possible roundhouses. Historical records of a Saxon ecclesiastical manor suggest Haddeenham was a settlement in Saxon times. Nine Anglo-Saxon graves were discovered next to the Three Kings pub.

During the Second World War, Haddenham was a Starfish bombing decoy site, both K-type (day) and Q-type (night), which were used to divert German bombing away from RAF Bomber Command's nearby airfields.

== Amenities ==
Haddenham has shops in the High Street, and one public house (The Three Kings), a beauty salon, GP's surgery, art gallery/center, a village hall known as the Arkenstall Centre, and a library that has been volunteer-run since 2003.

Holy Trinity Church dates from the 13th century and was extensively remodelled in the 19th century. Haddenham Baptist chapel dates from the late 18th century and the present building from 1905.

In September 2012, the village's new playpark was unveiled by Baroness Scott of Needham Market.

Bus services run to the cathedral city of Ely, approximately 6 miles (10 km) north-east of the village.

== Community ==
For over 40 years the village has hosted a Steam Rally, which attracts more than 20,000 visitors. The rally, with over 700 exhibits, is held in early September and raises money for local charities and causes. In 2025 it celebrated its 50th anniversary.

The annual village open day was 'Blossoms & Bygones', a Haddenham local and visitor attraction held until 2013. The event also covered the neighbouring hamlet of Aldreth and included tractor rides around the village, tours of the windmill and orchards, vintage car and tractor displays and open private gardens. In 2011 it held its 40th anniversary event, with a VE Day theme and villagers in 1940s costume. Blossoms and Bygones has now been replaced by the Aldreth Vintage Fair.

In 2015 Haddenham hosted its first annual Beer Festival, a three day volunteer-run event that raises money for local charities. Held on The Recreation Ground, it includes selling food and beer and other alcoholic beverages, live music, organised activities for children, and market stalls.

== Freedom of the Parish ==
The following people and military units have received the Freedom of the Parish of Haddenham.

=== Individuals ===
- Robert Norman: 14 July 2023
