= Stretham =

Village located in East Cambridgeshire, England

Coordinates: 52.35°N 0.22°E

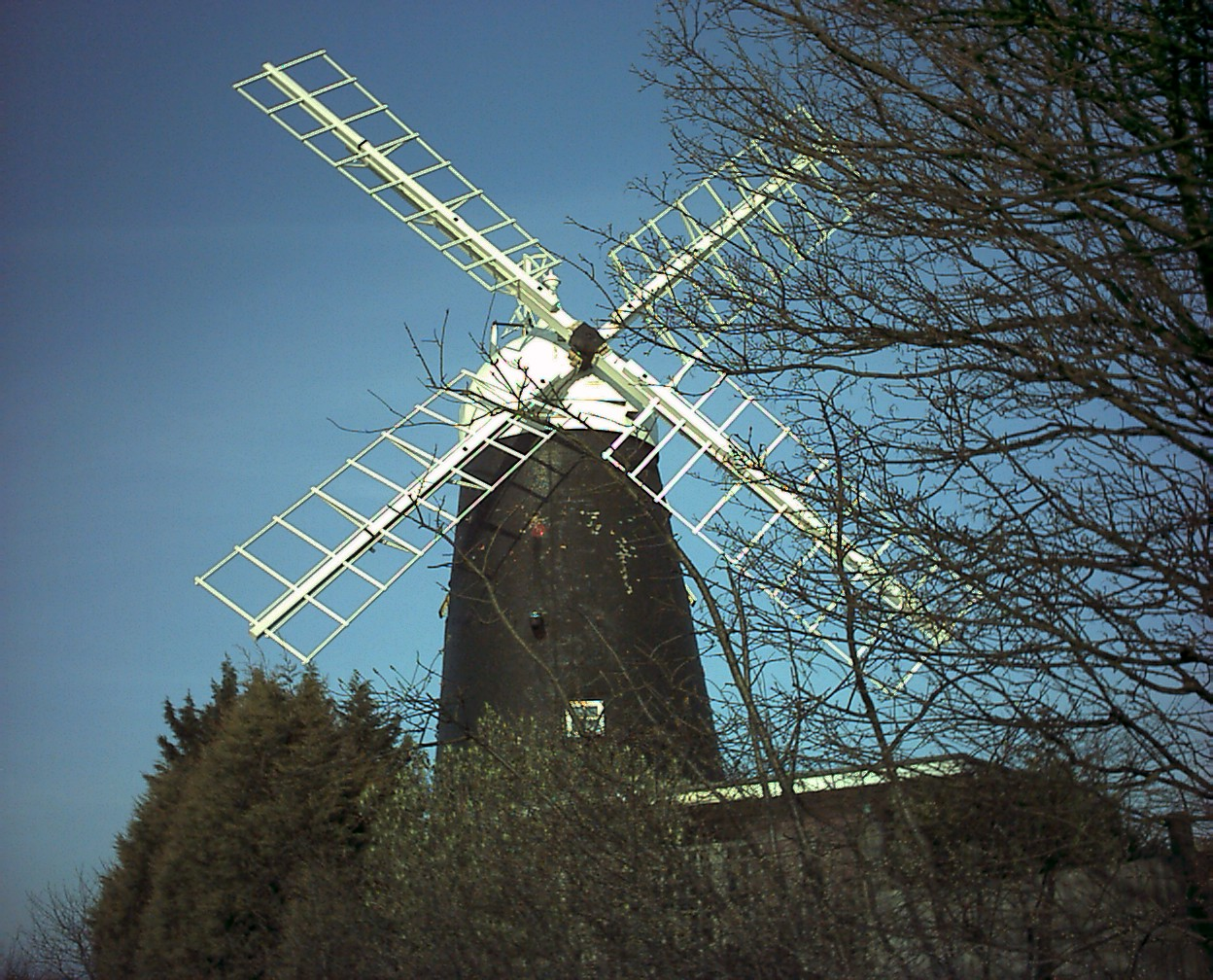
- Stretham Windmill

- Location within Cambridgeshire
- Area: 6.27 sq mi (16.2 km^{2})
- Population: 1,831
  - Density: 292/sq mi (113/km^{2})
- OS grid reference: TL513747
  - London: 64 mi (103 km) S
- Civil parish: Stretham
- District: East Cambridgeshire
- Shire county: Cambridgeshire
- Region: East
- Country: England
- Sovereign state: United Kingdom
- Post town: ELY
- Postcode district: CB6
- Dialling code: 01353
- Police: Cambridgeshire
- Fire: Cambridgeshire
- Ambulance: East of England
- UK Parliament: Ely and East Cambridgeshire
- Website: www.strethampc.org.uk

Stretham /ˈstrɛtəm/ (Note: Locally, the /t/ is a glottal stop: ['str???m] or even ['str??m]) is a village and civil parish 4 miles (6 km) south-south-west of Ely in Cambridgeshire, England, about 74 miles (119 km) by road from London. Its main attraction is Stretham Old Engine, a steam-powered pump used to drain the fens. The pump is still in use today although converted to electric power. It has open days throughout the year.

== History ==
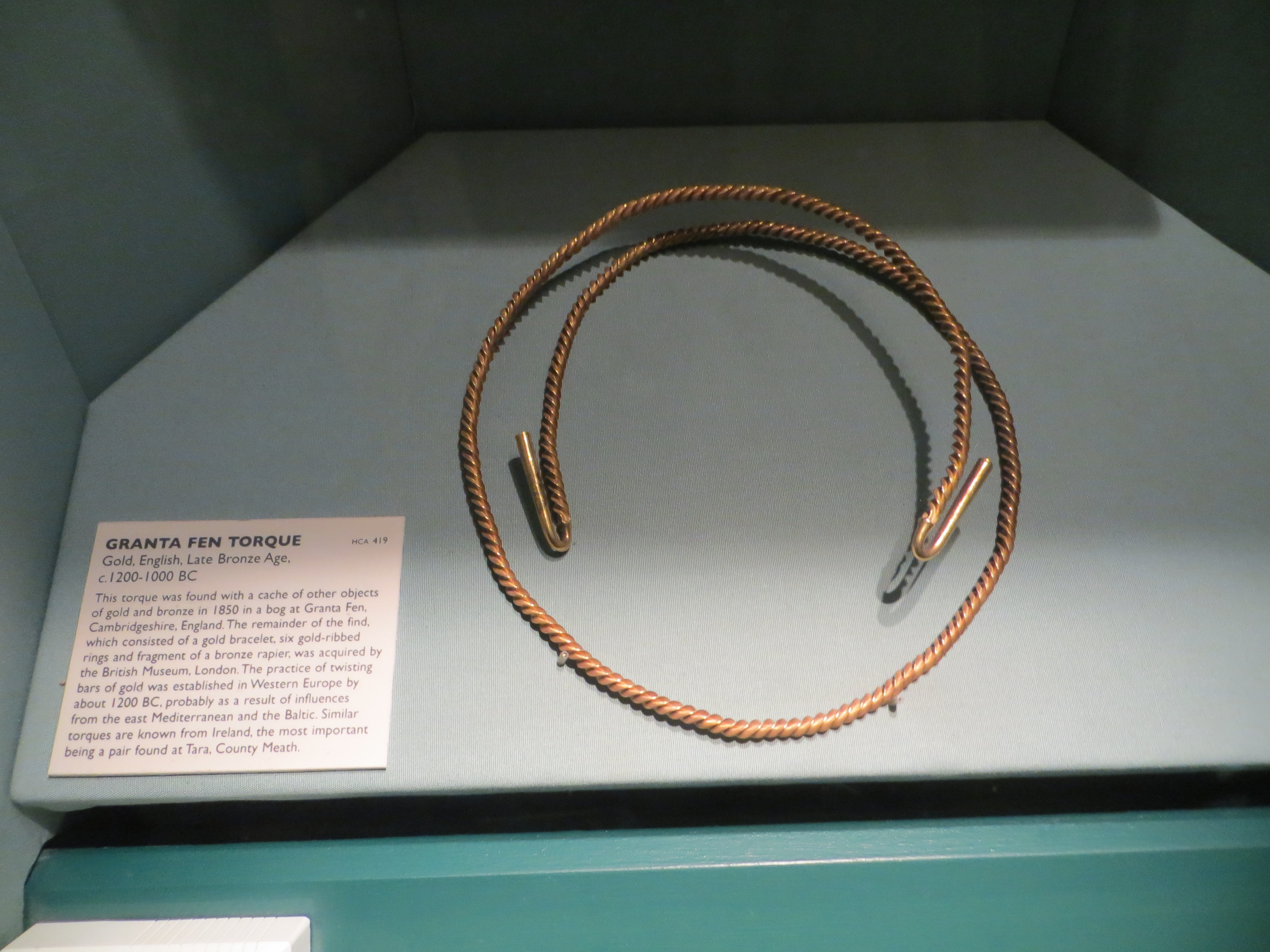
The torque from the hoard in the Hunt Museum

A Bronze Age hoard consisting of gold jewellery including a torque, bracelet, six ribbed-rings as well as a bronze rapier was discovered in Granta Fen near Stretham in 1850. Dating to between 1300 and 1000 BC, the torque is in the Hunt Museum in Limerick while the remainder of the treasure is in the British Museum.

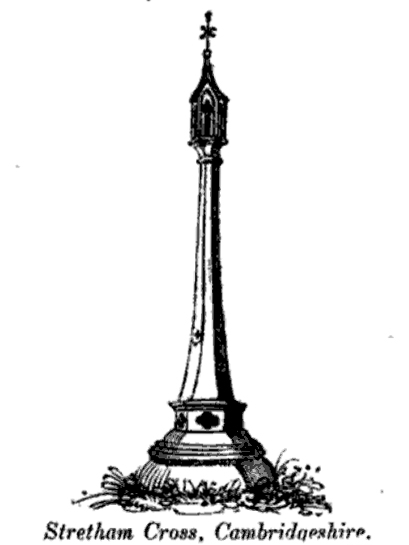
Early 15th century. This sketch by Sylvanus Urban (Pseud.) from The Gentleman's Magazine, and Historical Chronicle 1832

Stretham means homestead or village on the road (possibly Roman); Latin strata for paved road or old English ystrad for road plus old English ham for village. The route of the Roman road from Cambridge is uncertain beyond Waterbeach.

Brythnoth (the first Abbot of the Benedictine monastery at Ely Abbey) and Æthelwold (Bishop of Winchester) purchased the Stretham estate, among others including Haddenham, Wilburton and Witchford, after the restoration of the monastery in 970 with the encouragement of King Edgar. The Domesday Book records the village as "Stradham: Abbot of Ely. Fisheries."

Several fires have occurred in the village. In 1696 damage assessed at £2,170 was caused and a general collection was made. A more serious fire broke out on May Day 1844 in a hovel next to the blacksmith's shop. The whole of 'Bell Street' was destroyed and £20,000 worth of damage was caused. There was no engine in the village. About two o'clock the Haddenham engine arrived, and good use made of it, under the most active and energetic directions of the Rev. S. Banks, incumbent of Haddenham may be attributed the saving of a great part of the village. A fire of a similar character occurred in Stretham seventy-three years earlier, going over very nearly the same ground. This occurred early on a Sunday morning in May 1771, and in a short time consumed four houses, a malting and a barn, causing considerable losses for the owners. In the autumn of 1850 four fires, the work of incendiaries, occurred at Stretham in as many weeks, "by which property to a large amount was sacrificed." A detective from London made investigations, but the culprit was not discovered. In the September 1850 fire it was reported that the Red Lion Inn had been totally consumed.

The Stretham steam pumping engine, built in 1831 by Butterley Company, was one of the largest beam engines in the Fens; at 15 rpm it generated 105 horsepower lifting 30 tons of water per revolution, or 450 tons per minute.

The village was the site of an observation post of the Royal Observer Corps, in use during the Cold War from 1962 to 1968. The post is situated near the windmill, which also served as an aircraft post from 1936.

The river floods that began in mid-March 1947 affected over 1,000 square miles (2,600 km^{2}) of England, impacting thirty counties. It was the worst UK flooding event for over 200 years. The winter of 1946–1947 had been very severe, with mean average temperatures 4 °C (7 °F) below normal, for that time of year. Snow had been falling continuously since 23 January, with drifts up to 23 feet (7.0 m) deep in places. As the thaw began in mid-March, the warmer weather brought heavy rains. The rain running off the frozen ground, combined with the thaw, overwhelmed multiple rivers in England and eastern Wales, which flooded. The pumping station at Chear Fen, near Stretham, ran only for a short time during the floods, when one of the boilers broke down completely and the other boiler could not raise pressure. In 1950, a new pumping station was opened.

On 21 May 1954 a Swift, a jet flying out of RAF Waterbeach crashed onto the Chittering Farm Estate in Stretham Fen. Flying Officer Neil Hamilton Thornton, the pilot, was killed.

The skeletal remains of a 130-million-year-old Upper Jurassic Pliosaur were discovered in a 5 feet (1.5 m) deep Kimmeridge Clay pit in the village in 1952 by workers of the Great Ouse River Board. These carnivores could reach up to 65 feet (20 m) in length and pliosaur teeth are a common fossil; full skeletons are however rare. This particular 23 feet (7 m) example was named Stretosaurus macromerus in honour of the village where it was found.

== Stretham Feast Sunday ==
A Stretham Feast Sunday was celebrated in the village and continued into the second half of the 20th century. It provided an opportunity for family reunions. The event included a parade by local bands, local friendly societies, Mother's Union, Women's Institute, British Legion and decorated lorries.

== Governance ==
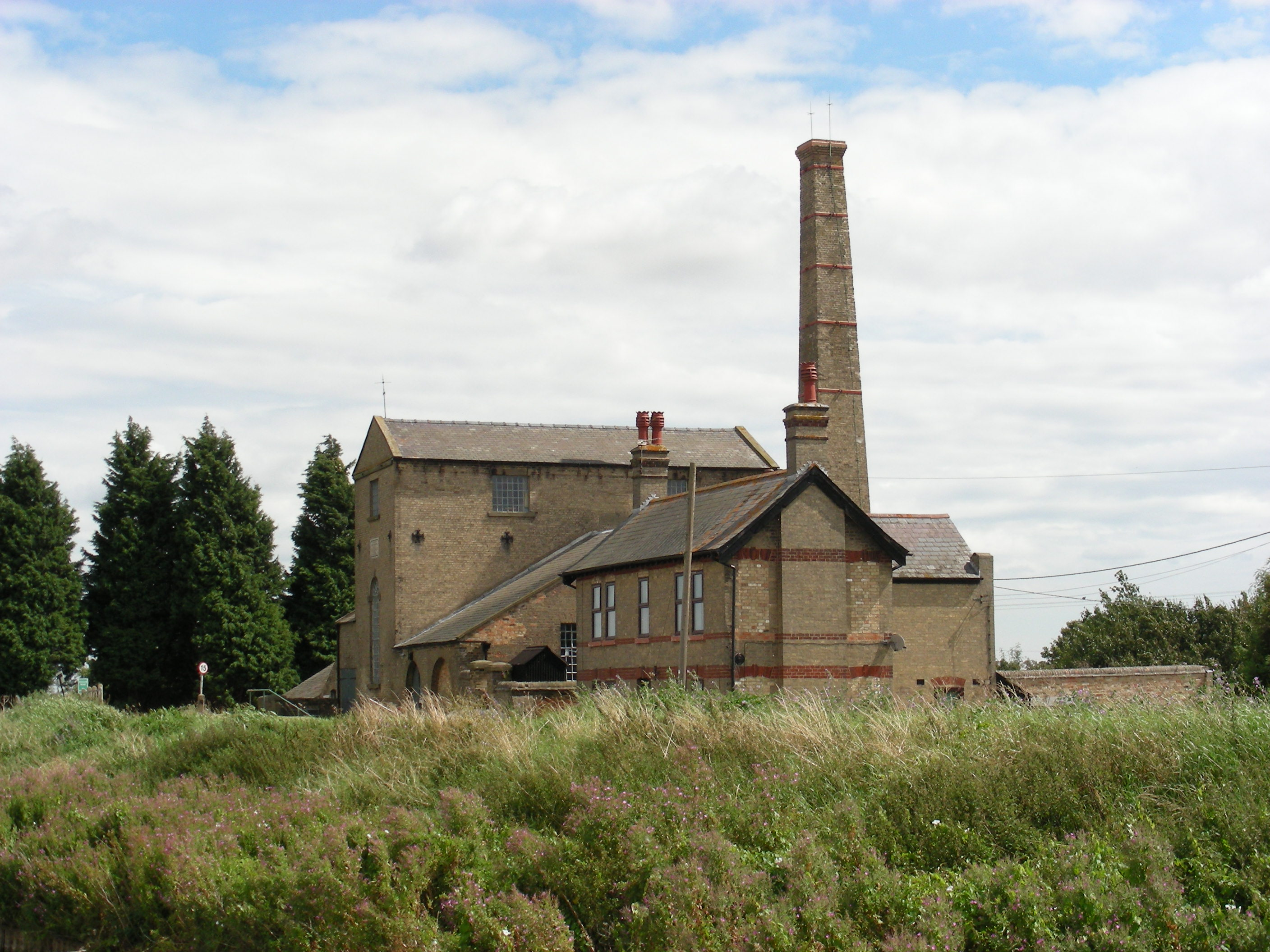
Stretham Old Engine, alongside the River Great Ouse

Stretham has a parish council. Parish council meetings are held in the village hall situated in the parish. Parish council services include bus shelters, cemeteries, shared equity housing, local planning consultation, play areas, village halls, and war memorials.

The area formed part of Ely Rural District from 1894 until 1974. East Cambridgeshire District Council (ECDC) was formed in 1974 with administration buildings in Ely. The district council collects council tax, provides services such as building regulations and local planning, leisure and tourism, handles issues strategic to the district, and many other services. The village (as at 2022) is in the ECDC Stretham Ward. Cambridgeshire County Council provides county-wide services such as major road infrastructure, libraries and heritage, and strategic planning.

A mobile library (as at 2022) visits 3 locations in the village every 1st Wednesday monthly.

The parish (as of 2024) is part of the Ely and East Cambridgeshire parliamentary constituency.

== Geography ==
=== Geology ===
The village is on an east–west running boulder clay (middle-Pleistocene till) ridge sitting on a belt of mainly Jurassic Kimmerigian clays running south-west from The Wash. To the east is a north–south running belt of geologically more recent Upper-Cretaceous Lower Greensand capped by Lower-Cretaceous Gault Clay; the whole area is surrounded by even more recent fen deposits. A rich layer of phosphate fossils, known locally as coprolite and mined for its fertiliser value, is to be found at the junction of Lower Greensand and Gault Clay. Further east is a north-east—south-west running belt of Cretaceous chalk. To the west, again running north-east—south-west, is a scarp belt of middle-Jurassic sedimentary rocks including limestone and sandstone.

The flat fenland countryside around the village, typical for this part of the region, lies about 16 feet (5 m) above sea-level. The highest point in the village is 53 feet (16 m) above sea-level and the highest point in the area is 85 feet (26 m) at Ely, three-mile (6 km) north-north-east. In contrast, the highest point in Cambridgeshire, 479 feet (146 m) above sea-level, is at Great Chishill, 23 miles (37 km) almost due south. Holme at nine feet (2.75 m) below sea-level is East Cambridgeshire's (and the United Kingdom's) lowest point, and is 23 miles (37 km) north-west.

=== Boundaries ===
The eastern border is formed by the River Cam. The River Great Ouse forms the south-west border then, at the Stretham Ferry Bridge, cuts through the south-eastern corner joining the River Cam at the north-east corner of the village. The A10 road crosses the River Great Ouse at close to the Stretham Ferry Bridge at the southern border of the village then, running firstly due north, cuts the village in half running north-east on towards Little Thetford then Ely. Newmarket road, in this area the west–east running A1123 from Huntingdon, joins the village coming from the west out of Wilburton through the village crossing the River Great Ouse at Gravel Farm then on towards Wicken.

=== Climate ===
The average annual rainfall of 24 inches (600 mm) makes Cambridgeshire one of the driest counties in the British Isles. Protected from the cool onshore coastal breezes east of the region, Cambridgeshire is warm in summer and cold and frosty in winter. Regional weather forecasting and historical summaries are available from the UK Met Office. The nearest Met Office weather station is Cambridge.

Climate data for Cambridge (1971–2000 averages)
Month	Jan	Feb	Mar	Apr	May	Jun	Jul	Aug	Sep	Oct	Nov	Dec	Year
Mean daily maximum °C (°F)	7.0 (44.6)	7.4 (45.3)	10.2 (50.4)	12.6 (54.7)	16.5 (61.7)	19.4 (66.9)	22.2 (72.0)	22.3 (72.1)	18.9 (66.0)	14.6 (58.3)	9.9 (49.8)	7.8 (46.0)	14.1 (57.4)
Mean daily minimum °C (°F)	1.3 (34.3)	1.1 (34.0)	2.9 (37.2)	4.0 (39.2)	6.7 (44.1)	9.8 (49.6)	12.0 (53.6)	11.9 (53.4)	10.1 (50.2)	7.1 (44.8)	3.7 (38.7)	2.3 (36.1)	6.1 (43.0)
Average rainfall mm (inches)	45.0 (1.77)	32.7 (1.29)	41.5 (1.63)	43.1 (1.70)	44.5 (1.75)	53.8 (2.12)	38.2 (1.50)	48.8 (1.92)	51.0 (2.01)	53.8 (2.12)	51.1 (2.01)	50.0 (1.97)	553.5 (21.79)
Source: Met Office

== Demography ==
Stretham is in output area classification zones (CGM) one through five; mainly classified as type three-C, accessible countryside, though about one third of the area is classed as three-A, village life. In both these classifications, most residents work from home employed in agriculture of fishing. The areas in this classification are less densely populated than other areas of the country. The usually detached households generally have two or more cars. Varied ethnic backgrounds are less likely in such areas.

Historical population of Stretham
Year	1801	1811	1821	1831	1841	1851	1861	1871	1881	1891	1901
Population	636	697	875	916	1,107	1,231	1,156	1,145	1,076	1,055	1,000
Year	1911	1921	1931	1941	1951	1961	1971	1981	1991	2001	2011
Population	961	897	993	(Note: No census 1941 due to World War II)	970	1,009	990	1,197	1,439	1,685	1,831
Census: 1801 – 2001 2011

== Notable buildings ==
To the east of the 12th century site of St James' Church stands an early 15th century cross "...the most perfect surviving example in the country."; it was restored in 1910. Parts of St James's Church are 14th century though it was heavily restored in the 19th century. A church clock was fitted in 1877. It chimes on two bells after the ordinary way, except when the hour is up, when it does not chime, but strikes on the large bell; the face is round, with two hands and an attractive appearance. Monuments include a tomb lid with an inscription which refers to Nicholas de Kyngestone, rector late 13th century; a brass to Joan Swan, 1497; a black marble slab for Anne Brunsell, 1667, wife of a rector, and sister of Sir Christopher Wren. The church is part of the Ely team ministry along with the nearby St George's Church, Little Thetford.

The Stretham Windmill (now a private home) at the top of High Street where it meets the A10 is a Grade II Listed Building (listed in 1988). It dates from 1881 and consists of four storeys of tarred brick and a metal ogee cap and fantail. The Royal Observer Corps were based adjacent to it from 1962 till 1968 and used the windmill itself as an aircraft observation post from 1936. The windmill is a notable landmark on the A10 road.

The Red Lion public house is a former coaching inn which had been operating since at least 1763.

The village store includes a post office.

== Transport ==
The village was once served by a railway station on the Ely and St Ives Railway. The line between Ely station and Sutton was opened 16 April 1866 under Great Eastern Railway (GER) operation. On 10 May 1878 the line was completed when the Needingworth junction, on the St Ives to March line, was linked to the Ely–St Ives branch. Although passenger traffic was always poor; the line closed to passengers 22 February 1931, seasonal freight traffic of sugar-beet and fruit kept the line going until it finally closed 5 October 1964.

In 1763 an agreement was reached to build a bridge across the River Great Ouse for the Ely-Cambridge turnpike at Stretham Ferry. The original bridge was replaced in 1925. The new bridge for the A10 at Stretham Ferry was constructed in 1975, diverting the road over the River Great Ouse at Chear Lode.

== Education ==
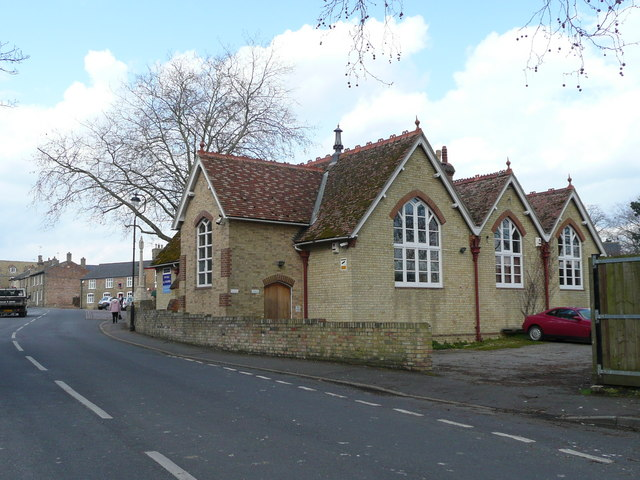
Former school building

Stretham Community Primary School serves the community.

== Notable people ==
- Hervey le Breton (d. 1131), Bishop of Ely.
- Lancelot Ridley (d. 1576), appointed one of the first Six Preachers of Canterbury Cathedral in 1541 and a rector of Stretham from 1560, was buried in the parish.
- John Parker (1532/3–1592), Church of England clergyman.
- Mark Ridley (1560–1624), son of Lancelot Ridley, physician who became the personal physician to the Tsar of Russia, was born in Stretham. A 7,203 entry Russian–English dictionary was published by Ridley, and also books on magnetism; he was a friend of William Gilbert.
- Ralph Brownrigg (1592–1659), Bishop of Exeter. Vicar in Stretham and Prebendary of Ely in 1821.
- James Brown (1709–1784) was an English cleric and academic. He was Master of Pembroke College, Cambridge from 1770 until his death. From 1771 he was vicar of Stretham. A close friend of Thomas Gray, he acted with William Mason as executor of Gray's will.
- Henry Hervey Baber (bap. 1775, d. 1869), philologist and Church of England clergyman, rector at St James, Stretham 1827–1869.
- Joseph Glynn (1799–1863), engineer, responsible for the Stretham steam pumping engine and others.
- Philip Freeman (1818–1875), Church of England clergyman and Archdeacon of Exeter. Married youngest daughter of Henry Hervey Baber (above).
- Sir George Harry Smith Willis (1823–1900), British Army general and colonel of the Middlesex Regiment (The Duke of Cambridge's Own). He inherited half of the manorial rights or lordship of Stretham in 1861 in the right of his wife (daughter of G. G. Morgan, the previous owner, who died in 1845).
- Jean Adamson (1928–2024), writer of the Topsy and Tim series, lived in the village.

== See also ==
- List of places in Cambridgeshire
- History of Cambridgeshire
