= Stretham railway station =

Former railway station in England

Stretham
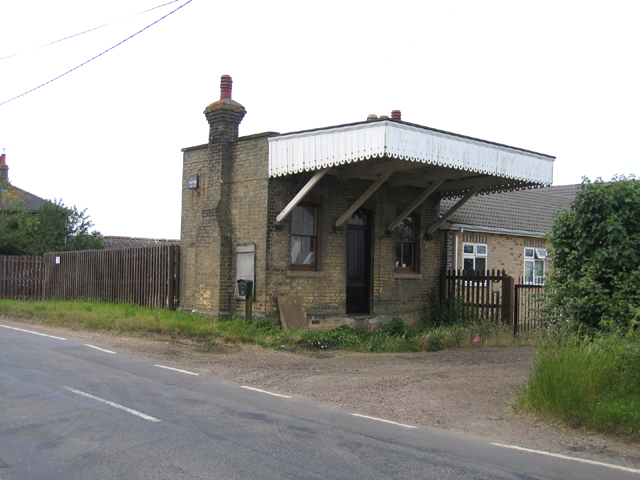
- Station building

General information
- Location: Stretham, East Cambridgeshire; England
- Coordinates: 52.3642°N 0.2238°E
- Grid reference: TL514763
- Platforms: 1

Other information
- Status: Disused

History
- Original company: Ely, Haddenham and Sutton Railway
- Pre-grouping: Great Eastern Railway
- Post-grouping: London and North Eastern Railway

Key dates
- 16 April 1866: Opened
- 2 February 1931: Closed to passengers
- 13 July 1964: Closed
Location

Stretham railway station was a station in Stretham, Cambridgeshire on the Ely and St Ives Railway.

== History ==
The railway line between Ely and Sutton was built by the Ely, Haddenham and Sutton Railway (EH&SR). It opened on 16 April 1866, and one of the original stations was that at Stretham. The EH&SR became the Ely and St Ives Railway in 1878 and was absorbed by the Great Eastern Railway in 1898. Regular passenger trains ceased to call at Stretham on 2 February 1931, but occasional passenger excursion trains used the station until around 1956. It was closed to goods on 13 July 1964.

The station featured a single platform, a signal box and a goods loop.

Preceding station	Disused railways	Following station
Wilburton	Great Eastern Railway; Ely and St Ives Railway	Ely

== Sources ==
- Awdry, Christopher (1990). Encyclopaedia of British Railway Companies. London: Guild Publishing. CN 8983.
- Butt, R.V.J. (1995). The Directory of Railway Stations. Yeovil: Patrick Stephens Ltd. ISBN 1-85260-508-1. R508.
- Joby, R.S. The Ely & St Ives Railway. Norwich: Klofron.
