= St James' Church, Stretham =

Coordinates: 52.35°N 0.22°E

St James'
- St James' Church, Stretham
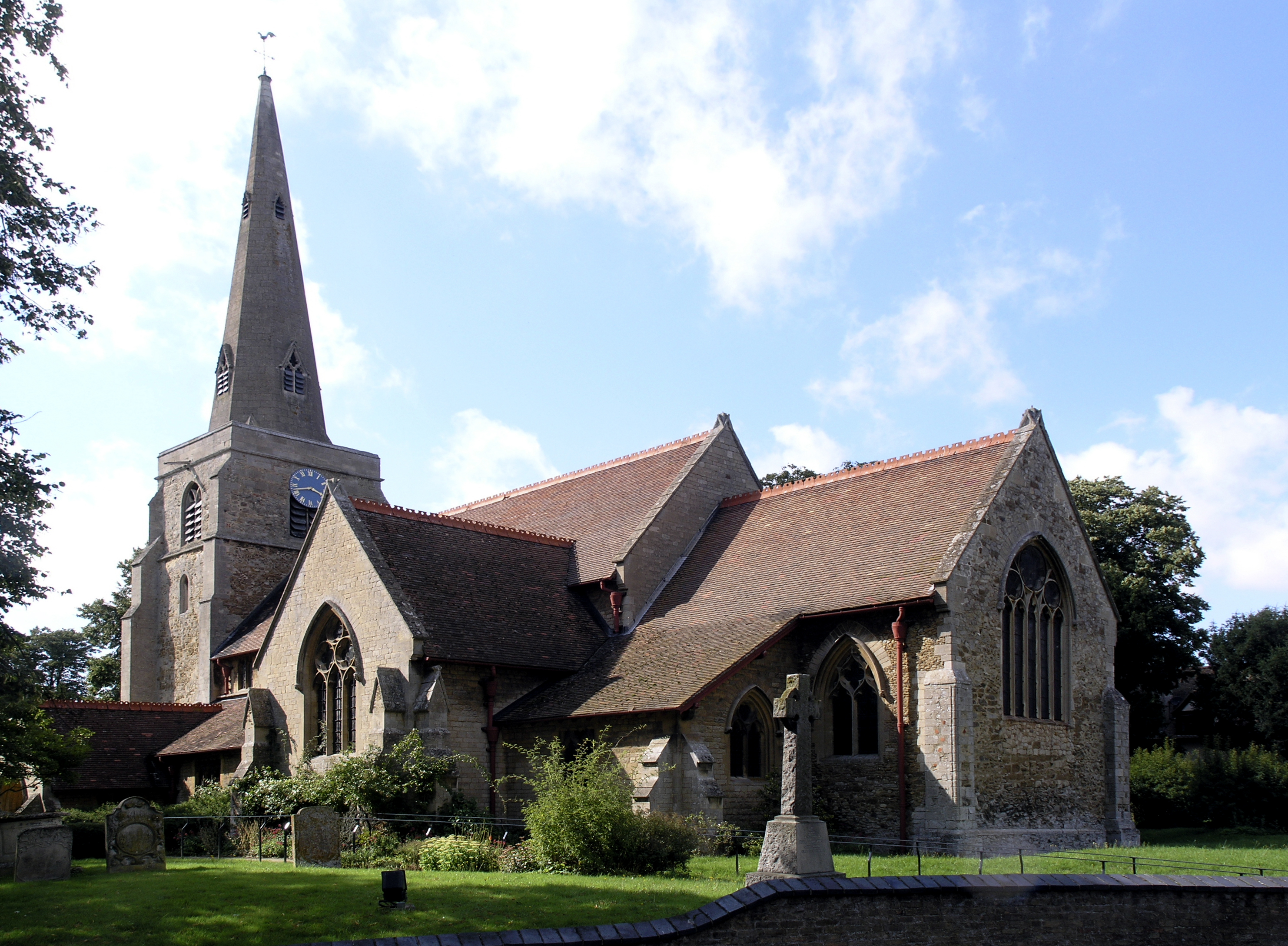
- North-west view from High Street. Single clock face can be seen on east face of tower.

- Location in Cambridgeshire
- OS grid reference: TL 51197 74610
- Location: Stretham, Cambridgeshire
- Country: England
- Denomination: Church of England
- Churchmanship: Evangelical
- Website: St James' Church, Stretham

History
- Founded: c. 12th century
- Dedication: Saint James
- Events: Extensive rebuilding 1868; Severe restoration 1876

Architecture
- Functional status: Active
- Heritage designation: Grade II*
- Designated: 5 February 1952
- Architect: J P St Aubyn
- Architectural type: Church
- Style: Gothic

Specifications
- Capacity: 312 (Note: Pews=206, free-standing chairs=106; seats for 15 within chancel not counted)
- Length: 28 metres (92 ft)
- Width: 13 metres (43 ft)
- Materials: Mainly rag and Barnack stone; crested ridge tiled roof

Administration
- Province: Province of Canterbury
- Diocese: Diocese of Ely
- Parish: Stretham

Clergy
- Bishop: Bishop of Ely

St James' Church, Stretham, is an active Anglican church in the village of Stretham, Cambridgeshire, England. Founded in the 12th century, it was heavily restored by the architect J. P. St Aubyn in 1876. English Heritage, a body responsible for preserving historical sites in the United Kingdom, assessed the church a Grade II* listed building. The turret clock on the east face of the tower was also made in 1876, by JB Joyce & Co of Whitchurch, Shropshire, and still keeps good time. The church has a ring of six bells hung for change ringing. Regular ringing resumed at the church in June 2011 after several years' silence. St James' is one of eight churches in the Ely Team Ministry.

== History ==
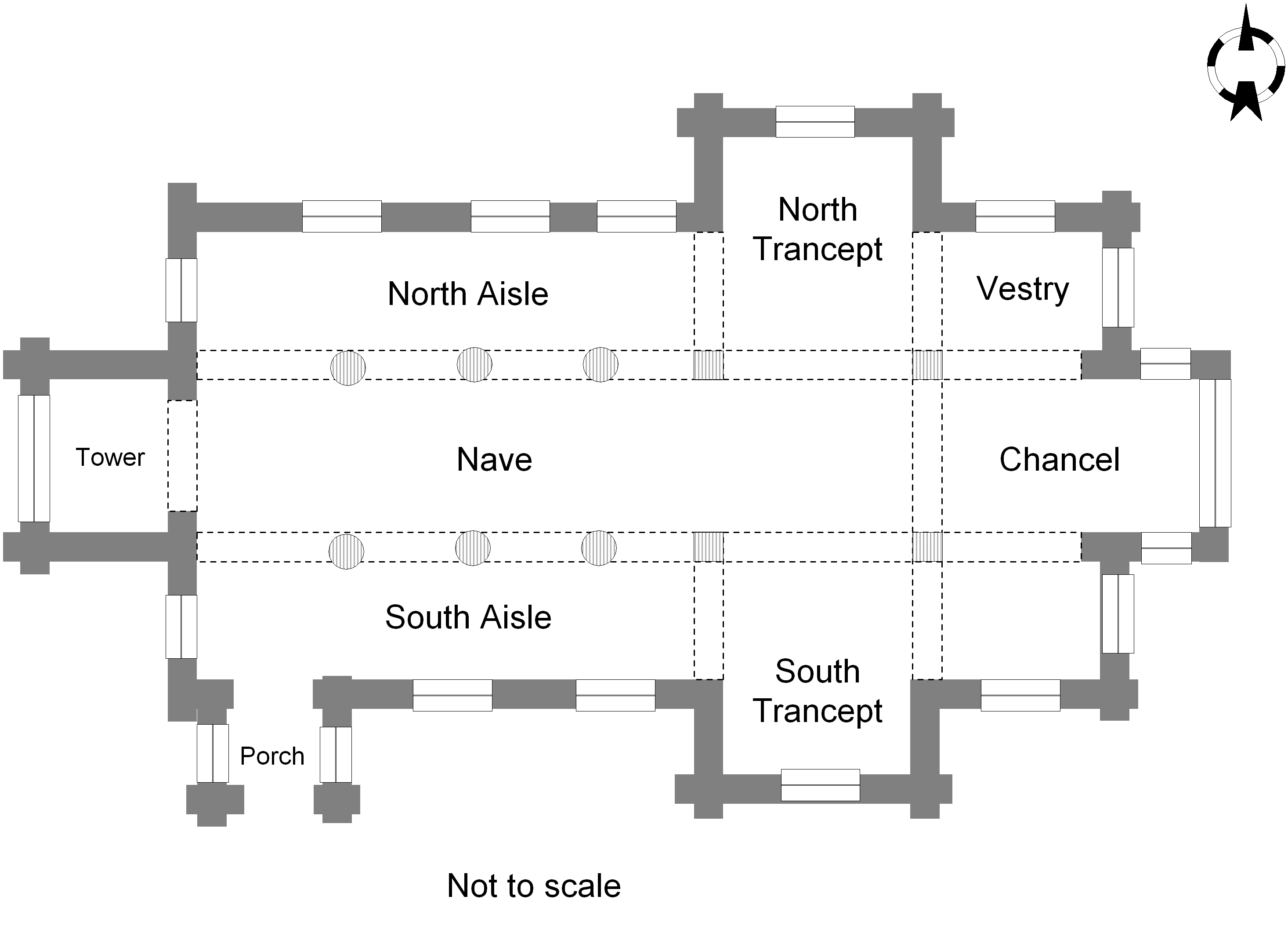
Plan view showing arrangement of windows and columns (Note: Summarised from Pugh and Lambeth Palace Library)

St James' Church stands in the centre of the small village of Stretham, which has a population of 1,685. (Note: 2001 census) The village lies 6 kilometres (4 mi) south-south-west of Ely in Cambridgeshire, England, about 119 kilometres (74 mi) by road from London. The earliest written record of this still active church is in the Liber Eliensis, a 12th-century history of the Isle of Ely. In 1137, during Bishop Nigel's (c. 1100–1169) time, Anglo-Saxon conspirators were said to have met in Stretham church. Fragments of the east chancel are known to be from about the 12th century, corroborating the record of the church's existence in that period.

Lancelot Ridley (d. 1576), appointed one of the first Six Preachers of Canterbury Cathedral in 1541 and a rector of Stretham from 1560, was buried in the parish. Mark Ridley (1560–1624), one of Lancelot's sons, became the physician to the Tsar of Russia.

In 1751, Francis Blomefield, in his Collectanea Cantabrigiensia, recorded St James' as having a square tower, with four bells and a clock. The north aisle was leaded and there was a chantry chapel at the east end with a screen. He concludes this to be the Chancel of the Resurrection. At this time, the south aisle, nave and chancel were also recorded as leaded.

The church was restored very heavily in 1876 by the architect J. P. St Aubyn at a cost of £4,400 (equivalent to £438,960 (Note: Using RPI as describe in Choosing the Best Indicator to Measure Relative Worth) in 2025). The north and south transepts were added at this time as well as the whole south aisle of the nave, the chancel, a clerestory and a new porch.

St James' Church, Stretham, is an historic building protected by acts of Parliament. (Note: First such act: Ancient Monuments Protection Act 1882 (45 & 46 Vict. c. 73)) Originally, the church was listed Grade A in a publicly available register on 5 February 1952 until a resurvey and regrading by English Heritage (Note: Act setting up English Heritage: National Heritage Act 1983 (c. 47)) on 19 August 1988. Since then, it is listed as a Grade II* building, which makes the church particularly important to the country's heritage and warrants every effort to preserve it. (Note: There are 374,081 listed buildings in England as of 26 September 2010) The church records (Note: Baptism 1558–present, banns 1759–1963, marriages 1558–1952, and burial 1558–1956 (Church of England only)) are kept in the County Records Office, Cambridge. (Note: Notice inside porch) Since 1990, St James' Church has had an ecumenical agreement with the Stretham Methodists. (Note: Copy of agreement displayed on the notice board inside the porch)

St James' is part of the Ely Team Ministry, a group of eight churches: St Mary's, Ely; St Peter's, Ely; St Leonard's, Little Downham; St Michael and All Angels, Chettisham; St George's, Little Thetford; St James, Stretham; Holy Cross, Stuntney; and St Peter's, Prickwillow. The Prickwillow church was closed for worship in 2008; it is part of the parish of St Mary's, Ely.

== Architecture ==
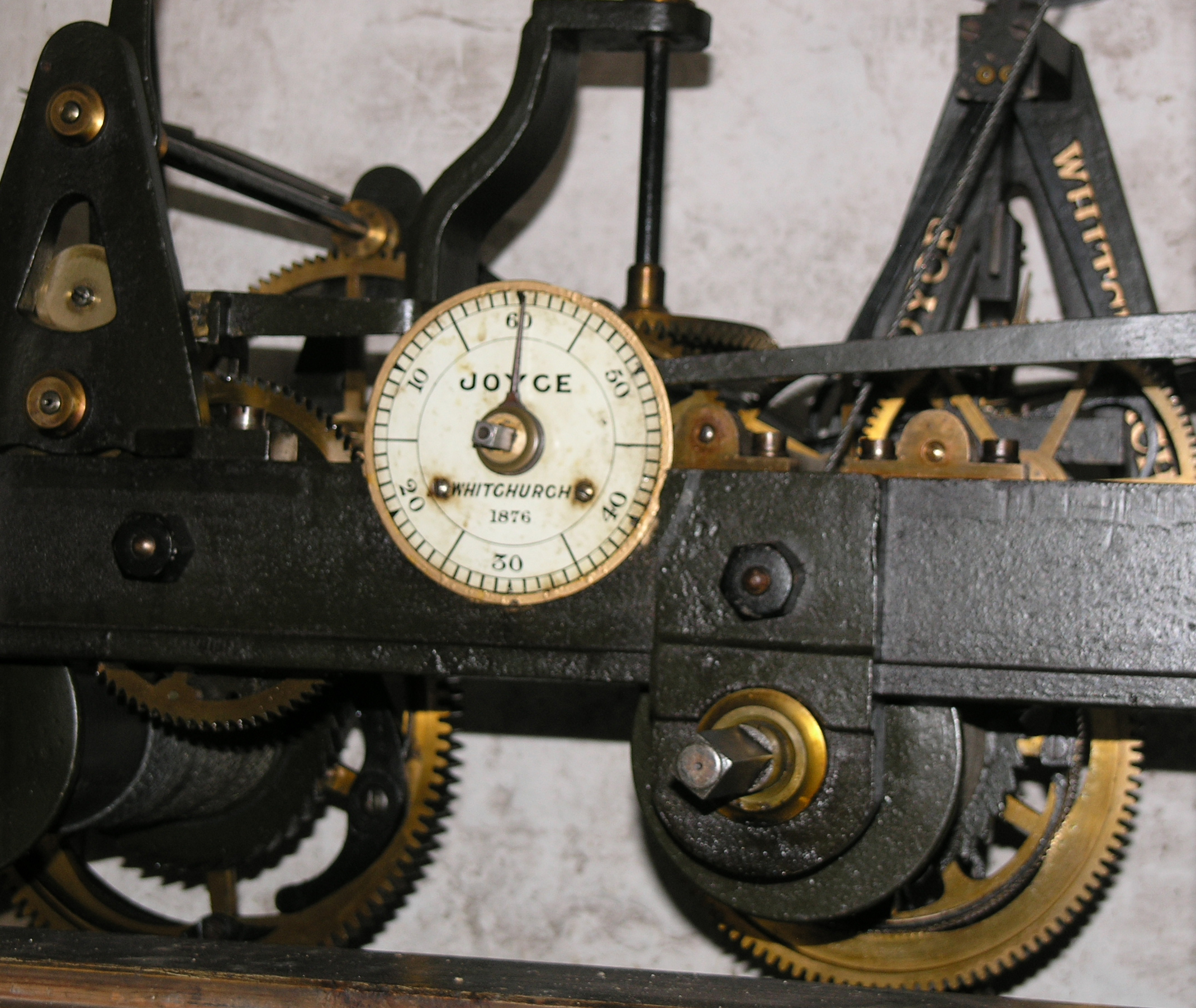
Part of the turret clock mechanism showing clockmaker as JB Joyce & Co of Whitchurch, Shropshire and date of manufacture of 1876

=== Exterior ===
The building is mainly 14th-century although the east wall of the chancel contains remnants of 12th-century material, including two clamped buttresses. (Note: The clamped (or clasped) buttresses can be seen on the east wall outside of the building pictured. "A buttress is a vertical member projecting from a wall to stabilize it or to resist the lateral thrust of an arch, roof or vault. Clasping buttress: one which encases the angle.") The ashlar-faced tower is 14th-century with angled buttresses north and south. The west window has three lights with flowing tracery. The clock on the east face of the tower, dated 1876, is by JB Joyce & Co of Whitchurch, Shropshire, the oldest firm of tower clockmakers in the world; it is wound weekly by the churchwardens.

The east wall of the chancery has one window with five lights (stained glass panels) with tracery above in a Gothic style. The church floodlighting is supported by funds from the National Lottery church floodlighting trust (Note: Plaque inside porch)

=== Interior ===
Inside St James'

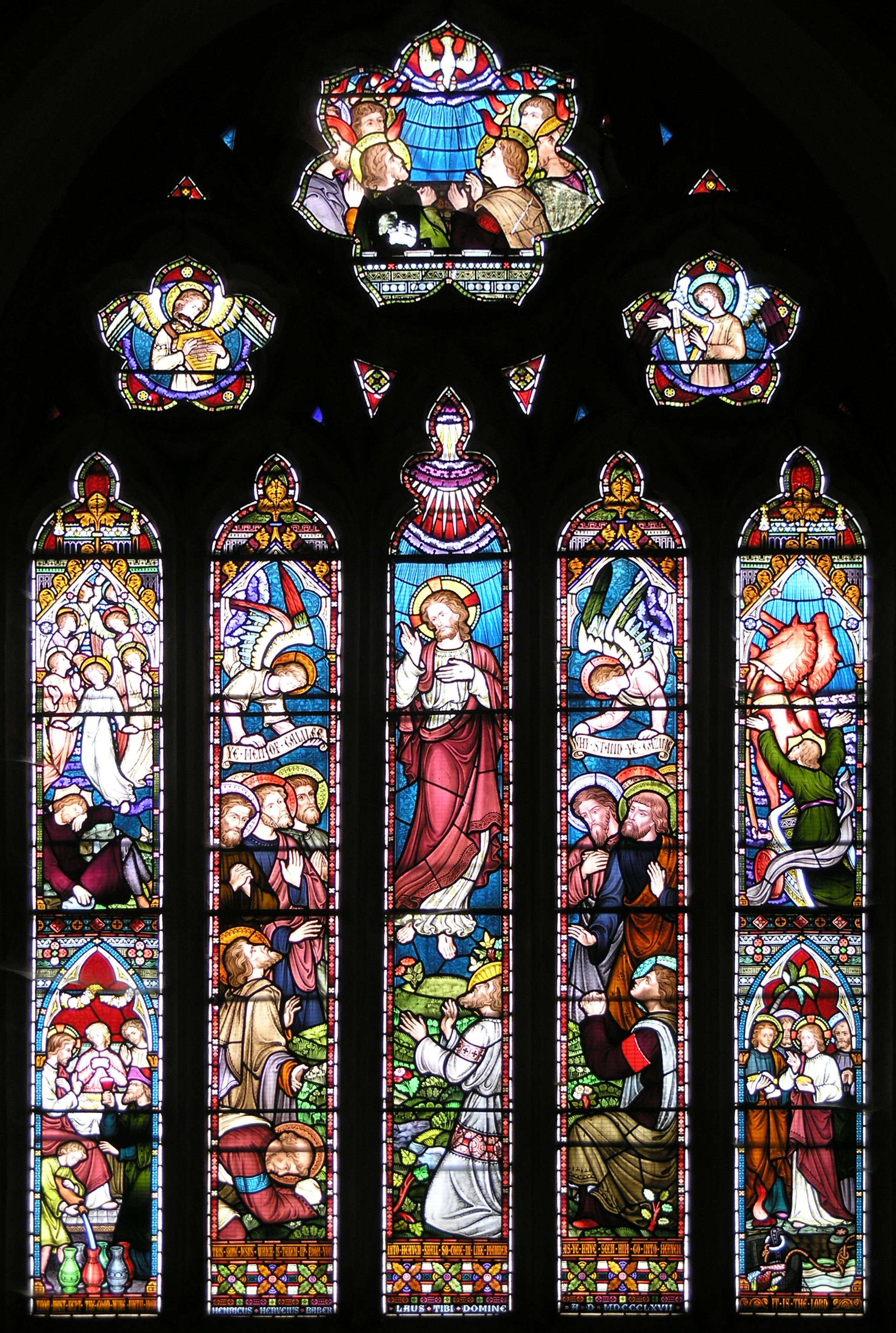
Chancel east five-light window

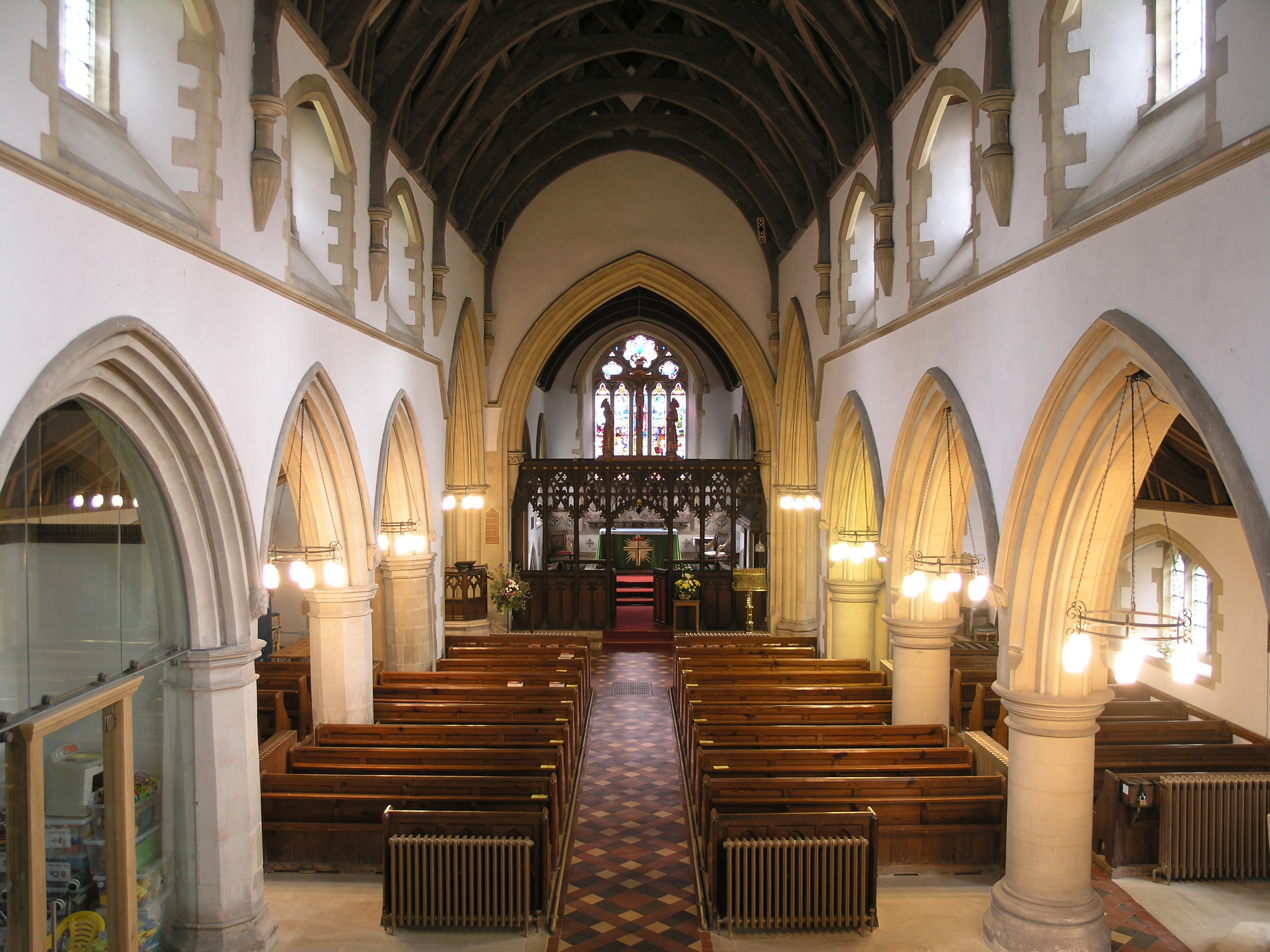
Nave, east towards chancel; aisles either side enclosed by arcades of four bays supporting the clerestories and the wooden rafters of the roof. The north (left) octagonal columns are 14th-century; the south round columns were added during the 1876 restoration.

There is a lowered sill on the southeast window of the chancel for a three-seat (sedilia); a cabinet (aumbry) is along the east of the north wall with an arched tomb recess to the west of it with an inscribed tomb lid which commemorates Nicholas de Kyngestone, late 13th-century rector. A 1440 oak screen to the chancel is very finely carved. Lying in the chancel is a black marble slab that dates back to 1667; it is a memorial, commemorating Anne Brunsell, sister of Sir Christopher Wren and wife of the rector of the time. The pipe rack organ, built in 1886 by J W Walker and sons of London, is in a chamber built onto the south wall of the chancery. Paddy Benson of Norman & Beard, carried out a reconstruction and enlargement of the organ in 1907 at a cost of £350 (equivalent to £36,403 in 2025); it was converted to electric blowing sometime after 1937.

== Bells ==
Until 1952, the church had a ring of five bells hung for change ringing; and at this time, a sixth bell was added and one bell was recast, replacing a 1727 bell by Henry Penn of Peterborough. (Note: Bells, one to six respectively are E, D, C, B, A and G. Tenor is 1,085-pound (492 kg) in G (761Hz)) The oldest bell as of 2010, is the 840-millimetre (33 in) 360-kilogram (790 lb) number four bell of 1796 by Joseph Eayre; the newest are of 1951 by John Taylor & Co of Loughborough. This set of six bells are rung from a first-floor ringing chamber above the recently constructed servery and toilets.

According to Canon K W H Felstead's records, now maintained by the Central Council of Church Bell Ringers, there have been 78 peals rung at St James' Church, Stretham, since 1952.

== Rectors ==
Rectors of Stretham and Little Thetford, Cambridgeshire, 1222–
From	To	Name	Comment
1222		Arnulf	
1276		Wymbisse, Thomas de	
1302		Dogelly, Richardus de	
1338		Hatherston William de; Bagthorpe, Nicholas de	Sub deacon
1351		Seyr, Robert; Thomas Darrant	
1366		Stratton, Robert de	Prebendary of Masam at York Minster and prebendary of Biggleswade, Lincoln Cathedral
1383		Osgodby, William de	By exchange with Thomas de Dalby
1383		Lindesay, John	
1407		Burgess, William	
1415		Braunston, John; Spalding, William	
1458		Redman, Richard	Distinct from Richard Redman, who became bishop of Ely
1488		Ryplingham, John	
1488		Ryplingham, Richard	
1523	1554	Ryseley, Richardus (Note: also Rysseley, Richardus)	
1554	1559	Young, Johannes (Note: also Younge, John)	
1559	1570	Ridley, Lancelotti (Note: also Rydley Lancelet)	Father of Mark Ridley (physician)
1570	1592	Parker, John (Note: also Parker, Johannes)	Archdeacon of Ely
1592	1598	Jones, Edwardus (Note: also Jones, Edwin)	
1598	1621	Lawrence, Willimus (Note: also Lawrence, William)	This gives dates 1598–1621, but tentatively
1621		Brownrigg, Ralp	Afterwards Bishop of Exeter
1623	1638	Felton, Nicholaus	Deprived by the Earl of Manchester and Parliamentary Visitor
1643		Clarke Matthew; Car, Robert	Rector in the time of Richard Cromwell (son of Oliver)
1662	1678	Brunsell, Henricus (Note: also Brunsell, Henry and Brumsell, Henry)	He married Anne, a sister of Christopher Wren.
1678	1690	Oldham, Richard (Note: also Oldham, Richardus)	
1690	1691	Kemp, Robert (Note: also Kemp, Robertus and Kempe, Robert)	
1696	1727	Perkins, Ralph (Note: also Perkins, Radulphus)	
1727	1771	Thomas, Charles (Note: also Thomas, Carolus)	
1771	1784	Brown, James (Note: also Browne, James)	
1784	1802	Swaine, John	
1802	1812	Morgan, Caesar	
1812	1818	Law, Henry	As a JP he was a figure of the Ely and Littleport riots 1816.
1818	1827	Sparke, John Henry	Canon of Ely; he was eldest son of Bowyer Sparke.
1827	1869	Baber, Henry Hervey (Note: also Baber, Henry Harvey)	Keeper of printed books at British Museum
1869	1884	Pigot, Hugh	Manchester Guardian obituary
1885	1906	Cockshott, John William	Hon. Canon of Ely. Times notice of appointment.
1906	1945	Stitt, S Stuart	Times notice of appointment following resignation of J W Cockshott; Times notice of death 31 July 1945.
1945	1952	Cowgill, John E	Lambeth Palace records
1952	1955	Loughborough, George W	Times notice of promotion
1955	1965	Foulds, Dennis	Times notice of appointment
1966	1974	Hornby John H	Times notice of appointment
1974	1993	Askey, John Stuart	
1994	1998	Raby, Malcolm	From 1994 incumbents are known as team vicars
1999	2005	Sansom, John	
2005	2009	Scott, Pauline Claire Michalak	
2009	—	Harper, Margaret	

Records before 1523 have not been confirmed; they have been checked (other than minor spelling differences) with the painted board in the south-west corner of the nave.
