= Wilburton railway station =

Former railway station in England

Wilburton
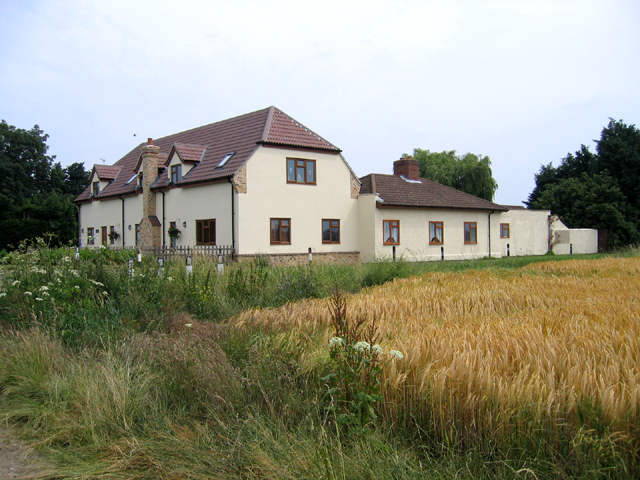
- Station building

General information
- Location: Wilburton, East Cambridgeshire; England
- Coordinates: 52.3662°N 0.1774°E
- Platforms: 1

Other information
- Status: Disused

History
- Original company: Ely and St Ives Railway
- Pre-grouping: Great Eastern Railway
- Post-grouping: London and North Eastern Railway

Key dates
- 16 April 1866: Opened
- 2 February 1931: Closed to passengers
- 13 July 1964: Closed
Location

Wilburton railway station was a station in Wilburton, Cambridgeshire on the Ely and St Ives Railway. It was closed to regular passenger trains in 1931, excursion trains in 1958, and completely in 1964 along with the rest of the route.

The station featured a single platform, a signal box and a goods shed/granary on a loop.

Preceding station	Disused railways	Following station
Haddenham	Great Eastern Railway; Ely and St Ives Railway	Stretham

== Sources ==
- RS Joby. The Ely & St Ives Railway. Norwich: Klofron.
