= Bluntisham railway station =

Disused railway station in Bluntisham, Huntingdonshire

Bluntisham
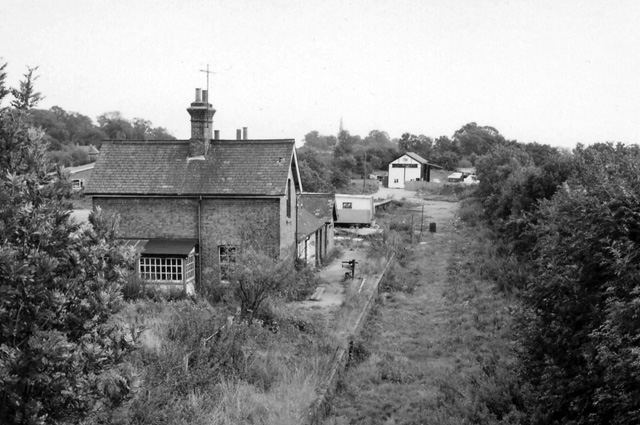
- The station in 1974

General information
- Location: Bluntisham, Huntingdonshire; England
- Coordinates: 52.3486°N 0.0018°E
- Platforms: 1

Other information
- Status: Disused

History
- Original company: Ely and St Ives Railway
- Pre-grouping: Great Eastern Railway
- Post-grouping: London and North Eastern Railway

Key dates
- 10 May 1878: Opened
- 2 February 1931: Closed to passengers
- 5 October 1964: Closed for freight
Location

Bluntisham railway station was a station in Bluntisham, Cambridgeshire on the Ely and St Ives Railway. The station closed for regular passenger services in 1931 but was used for special excursion trains until 1958 The station had a single platform, a signal box, and a goods shed on a loop.

Preceding station	Disused railways	Following station
St Ives	Great Eastern Railway; Ely and St Ives Railway	Earith Bridge
