= Haddenham railway station =

Haddenham railway station may refer to:

- Haddenham & Thame Parkway railway station, a current station in the town of Haddenham, Buckinghamshire, England
- Haddenham railway station (Buckinghamshire), a former station in the town of Haddenham, Buckinghamshire, England
- Haddenham railway station (Cambridgeshire), a former station in Cambridgeshire, England
