= Philip Freeman =

Philip Freeman (1818–1875) was a Church of England cleric and Archdeacon of Exeter.

== Life ==
Freeman, son of Edmund Freeman, of the Cedars, Combs, Suffolk, and Margaret, daughter of William Hughes of Wexford, Ireland, was born at the Cedars, Combs, Suffolk on 3 February 1818. He was educated at Dedham Grammar School under Dr George Taylor.

In October 1835, he became a scholar of Trinity College, Cambridge, and in 1837 and 1838 was awarded Sir William Browne's medals for a Latin ode and epigrams. He was elected Craven University scholar in 1838, graduated B.A. in 1839, and after being chosen fellow and tutor of Peterhouse, in 1842 took his M.A. degree.

He was principal of the Chichester Theological College from 1846 to 1848, and was a canon and a reader in theology in Cumbrae College (the college built by the Earl of Glasgow in the island of Great Cumbrae, Buteshire) from 1853 to 1858, at the same time having charge of the episcopal church in that island. He was presented by the dean and chapter of Exeter to the vicarage of Thorverton, Devonshire, in 1858, was appointed a prebendary of Exeter Cathedral in November 1861, and as one of the four residentiary canons in 1864, and acted for some time as examining chaplain to the bishop of the diocese. Finally, he was appointed archdeacon of Exeter in April 1865. He spent much time and money on the restoration work on the cathedral and on his own parish church at Thorverton. In 1869, at the meeting of the British Association in Exeter, he delivered a paper "On Man and the Animals, being a Counter Theory to Mr. Darwin's as to the Origin of Species". He was an authority on liturgical and architectural questions, and wrote numerous works on those subjects, and also contributed frequently to the Ecclesiologist, the Christian Remembrancer, and the Guardian.

In 1866 he engaged in a controversy with Archdeacon Denison as to the "Real Presence". He was injured in an accident while getting out of a train at Chalk Farm station, London, on 18 February 1875; and died from his injuries on 24 February (at the residence of Thomas Gambier, surgeon, 1 Northumberland Terrace, Primrose Hill). He was buried in Thorverton churchyard on 2 March. His will was proved on 3 April under £25,000.

He married, 18 August 1846, Ann, youngest daughter of the Rev. Henry Hervey Baber. She was born at the British Museum 11 February 1821, and survived him.

== Works ==
- Carmen Latinum Comitiis Maximis recitatum, A.D. 1837. Newtonus, Cambridge, 1838.
- Church Principles as bearing upon certain Statutes of the University of Cambridge, 1841.
- Theses Ecclesiasticæ sive orationes in curia Cantabrigiensi habitæ, 1844.
- Thoughts on the Dissolution of the Camden Society, 1845.
- Proportion in the Gothic Architecture, 1848.
- An Appeal as to the Chichester Diocesan Training College and Bishop Otter's Memorial, 1848.
- "Sunday", a poem, 1851.
- A Plea for the Education of the Clergy, 1851.
- Plain Directions for using Morning and Evening Prayer, 1853.
- A Short Account of the Collegiate Church of Cumbrae, 1854.
- The Principles of Divine Service. An inquiry concerning the manner of understanding the order of Morning and Evening Prayer and the administration of the Holy Communion, 2 parts, 1855–62.
- Four sermons for Advent, 1859.
- Guessing Stories, 1864; 3rd ed. 1876.
- The Harmony of Scripture and Science, 1864.
- The Real Presence; the Worship Due. Correspondence between the Archdeacon of Taunton and the Archdeacon of Exeter, 1866.
- Rites and Ritual, a Plea for Apostolic Doctrine and Worship, 1866; 4th ed., revised, 1866.
- A Tract about Church Rates and Church Endowments, 1866.
- Church Rates, the Patrimony of the Poor; an attempt to set the subject in a new point of view, 1867.
- The History and Characteristics of Exeter Cathedral, with an Appendix on the Screens, 1871.
- The Admonitory Clauses in the Church's Homiletical Creed, 1872.
- The Architectural History of Exeter Cathedral, 1873.
- "A Challenge to the Ritualists." Correspondence between the Archdeacon of Exeter and B. W. Savile on the attempt at Romanising the English Church, 1874.
