= Lancelot Ridley =

English theologian and clergyman (died 1576)

Lancelot Ridley (died 1576) was an English clergyman, known as a theological writer, and rector of St James' Church, Stretham, Cambridgeshire.

== Life ==
He was educated at Clare Hall, Cambridge, and proceeded B.A. 1523–4, and commenced M.A. 1527, B.D. 1537, and D.D. 1540 or 1541. On the reorganisation of Canterbury Cathedral under the King's charter on 8 April 1541 he was constituted, on Thomas Cranmer's recommendation, one of the Six Preachers of the cathedral. With John Scory and Michael Drum, he made up the trio of representatives of the 'New Learning' among the original six. This was intentional on Cranmer's part, and Ridley found himself immediately confronted by conservative resistance to his views. He was dismissive of prayers said in foreign languages; Stephen Gardiner, who had been travelling, noted that this went further than some German reformers. Ridley took part in the disputation Cranmer set up on Trinity Sunday 1542, in Croydon, with the other Canterbury preachers and prebendaries.

Under Edward VI he was a defender of Protestantism, and Nicholas Ridley seems to have meditated his promotion to the chancellorship of St. Paul's Cathedral on the translation of Edmund Grindal to a bishopric in November 1551. He was collated to the rectory of Willingham, Cambridgeshire, on 10 June 1545, holding it until 1554.

On Mary I's accession Ridley was proceeded against as a married clergyman. He failed to appear on the day of visitation, but pleaded guilty in the chapter-house 10 days later and was deprived. John Bale heard a report that Ridley subsequently put away his wife and returned to celibacy and Roman Catholicism. He was deprived of the rectory of Willingham on or before 5 May 1554. Under Elizabeth I, however, he reappears in 1560 as one of the Six Preachers of Canterbury. He was also in the same year appointed rector of St James' Church, Stretham in Cambridgeshire, where he was buried on 16 June 1576.

== Notable works ==
- An Exposition upon the Epistle of Jude the Apostle of Christ, wherein he setteth plainli before every man's eyes false Apostles and their craftes, bi the whiche they have long deceived symple Christian people, London, 1538.
- A Commentary in Englishe upon Sayncte Paule's Epistle to the Ephesians for the instruction of them that be unlearned in tonges gathered out of the Holy Scryptures and of the olde Catholyke Doctours of the Churche, and of the best authors that nowe a dayes do wryte, London, 1540.
- An Exposition in Englyshe upon the Epystyll of Saynt Paule to the Phillipians for the instruction of them, London, 1545(?).
- An Exposition in Englyshe upon the Epistle of S. Paule to the Colossians, London, 1548.

The first three books are reprinted in Legh Richmond's Fathers of the English Church. Ridley is also credited by John Tanner and John Bale with other expositions of scripture, as well as works De XIII Abusionibus Missæ, and De Conjugio Ministrorum.

== Family ==
Ridley is said to have been the son of John Ridley of Willimoteswick in Northumberland, by Margaret, daughter of Richard Horton, and grandson of Sir Nicholas Ridley. Nicholas Ridley, bishop of London, was his first cousin. He married Mary, daughter of Christopher Paterson, and had two sons, Henry and Mark Ridley.
