= Sutton railway station (Cambridgeshire) =

Former railway station in England

Sutton

General information
- Location: Sutton, East Cambridgeshire; England
- Coordinates: 52.3858°N 0.1328°E
- Platforms: 2

Other information
- Status: Disused

History
- Original company: Ely and St Ives Railway
- Pre-grouping: Great Eastern Railway
- Post-grouping: London and North Eastern Railway

Key dates
- 16 April 1866: Opened
- 10 May 1878: resited
- 2 February 1931: Closed to passengers
- 13 July 1964: Closed
Location

Sutton railway station was a station in Sutton, Cambridgeshire on the Ely and St Ives Railway.

The first station opened in 1866 but it became the goods station in 1878 when a new station was built on the new alignment for the extension to St. Ives. There was a signal box at the station. It was closed for regular passenger services in 1931 but was used for special excursion trains until 1958.

Preceding station	Disused railways	Following station
Earith Bridge	Great Eastern Railway; Ely and St Ives Railway	Haddenham
