= Sutton-in-the-Isle =

Village in Cambridgeshire, England

Coordinates: 52.38737°N 0.11600°E

Sutton
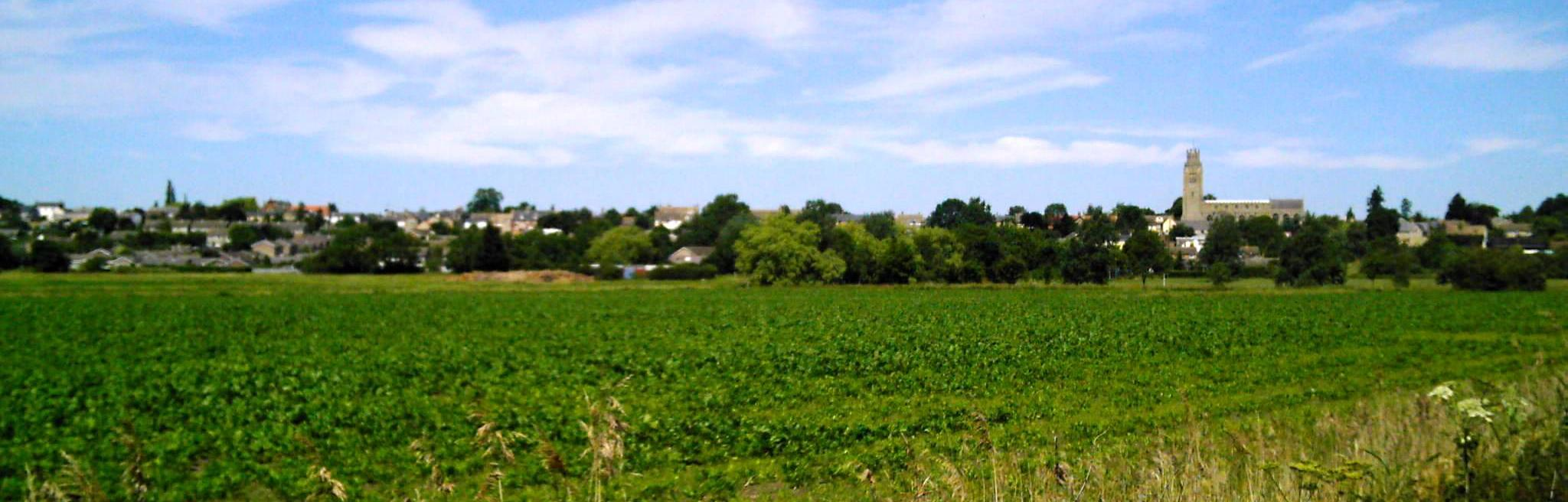

- Location within Cambridgeshire
- Population: 3,952 (2011)
- OS grid reference: TL441787
- District: East Cambridgeshire
- Shire county: Cambridgeshire
- Region: East
- Country: England
- Sovereign state: United Kingdom
- Post town: Ely
- Postcode district: CB6
- Dialling code: 01353
- Police: Cambridgeshire
- Fire: Cambridgeshire
- Ambulance: East of England
- UK Parliament: Ely and East Cambridgeshire
- Website: www.sutton-cambs-pc.gov.uk

Sutton or Sutton-in-the-Isle is a village and civil parish in the county of Cambridgeshire in England, near the city of Ely. The "in-the-Isle" suffix refers to the fact that the village is part of the Isle of Ely, once an island in the Fens and also an administrative county until 1965.

The village location on the high ground of the Isle of Ely provides commanding views across the surrounding low-lying fens.

== History ==
The village was mentioned in the Domesday Book of 1086, identified as Sudtone. There were then 9 sokemen, 8 villeins (each with 7.5 acres), 15 cotters and 7 serfs.

In 1109, the charter 51 of Bishop Hervey included Suttune in the lands recorded as being conferred upon the Cathedral Priory of Ely. According to the Ely Diocesan Register, the Manor of Sutton was established in 1292 and belonged to the Priory. In 1312, Sutton was granted the right to hold a street market each Thursday; this was held on the broader part of the High Street, outside what is now the One Stop Shop. During the 14th century, the Sutton resident Reginald de Beringhale also became a major landowner, further developing his father's programme of land acquisition.

The vicarage of St Andrew's was instituted in 1254, and the re-building of the church started between 1350 and 1360. It was completed by 1388. With two octagons atop each other crowning its square tower, it is reminiscent of Ely Cathedral, from whom it enjoyed patronage. It has a distinctively shaped tower that is often described as being in the shape of a pepper pot. Several non-conformist chapels once also existed in the village. These included a Methodist chapel constructed in 1790, following a visit by John Wesley in 1774, and a Baptist chapel built in the same century. Both of these closed in recent decades, leaving the Anglican church as the sole place of worship.

By 1599, the village was so prosperous that it became known as "Golden Sutton." In 1800, it had a population of about 950, quickly rising to 1,862 by 1851.

Although a school had been established in the village in 1579, under William Heye, it was not until 1860 that the first purpose-built school building opened. John Taylor was the first headmaster for the boys, and his wife was the headmistress for the girls. The school continues to this day and has expanded to serve the village's growing population.

A railway station was opened in 1866, with the Great Eastern Railway inaugurating passenger-train services to Ely on 16 April. The railway line was later extended round the edge of the fen to Earith Bridge and onto St Ives, with this branch opening on 11 May 1878. The combined line was then reorganised to become the Ely and St Ives Railway. The branch to St Ives was closed on 6 October 1958, followed by the line to Ely on 13 July 1964, as part of the Beeching Axe.

In 1942, with the increase in bomber operations in World War II, work began on RAF Mepal between the villages of Sutton and Mepal. The airfield opened in 1943 and remained operational for the rest of the war.

During the 1960s, the Sutton Gault hamlet was the site of one of the world's first tracked hovercraft, designed by Eric Laithwaite. A linear induction motor propelled this hovertrain and ran alongside the Old Bedford River, on a one-mile section of air-cushion trackway.

In 1984, Sutton Village was given a bypass. In 2002, it won the East Cambs, Cambridgeshire and Calor England and Wales Village of the Year awards.

The village has known a variety of businesses throughout its history. It was once well known for fruit-growing, but has also been a place for cheese production. Later, it manufactured road sweepers, and now it hosts a monthly auction of construction and agricultural equipment, which is the largest of its kind in Europe. In addition, a straw-burning power station was opened in 1996.

== Governance ==
Sutton is a civil parish with an elected parish council. Services include community meeting rooms, sports and recreation facilities, a bus shelter, a cemetery, local planning consultation, a community time bank, play area, street lighting, grants to local organisations and a war memorial. Parish council meetings are usually held in either The Glebe or The Pavilion on a Tuesday evening.

The village was part of Ely Rural District council from 1894 until 1974. East Cambridgeshire District Council (ECDC) was formed in 1974 with administration buildings in Ely. The district council collects taxes, provides services such as building regulations and local planning, leisure and tourism, handles issues strategic to the district, and many other services. The village is part of Sutton ward, which includes some smaller neighbouring villages and is represented by two district councillors. East Cambridgeshire is in turn part of Cambridgeshire County Council which has administration buildings in Cambridge. The county council provides county-wide services such as major road infrastructure, fire and rescue, libraries and heritage, and strategic planning. The village is part of the Sutton electoral division, represented by a county councillor who also represents a number of smaller neighbouring villages.

The parish council developed a neighbourhood plan for the parish, which was adopted following a referendum on 2 May 2019, with 90.5% of voters supporting the plan. This was revised and an updated neighbourhood plan was adopted following a referendum on 4 July 2024, with 86.3% of voters supporting the updated plan.

== Village amenities ==
Currently the village has a One Stop shop, a Co-Op shop, a pharmacy, a hairdressers, a barbers, an Indian restaurant and take-away, a Chinese take-away and chip shop, a fish and chip shop, a pub "Chequers", a family run garage and a motor repair centre. There is also a GP surgery. The old butcher's shop in the High Street became a deli, with seating for food and beverages. and more recently has become a well used cafe.

Bus services link the village to Ely and Cambridge to the south and Chatteris to the north with an hourly service during the daytime and no service in the evenings or on a Sunday. There is also a daytime service to the guided busway an Longstanton.

The Glebe community centre provides a range of meeting rooms used by local community groups as well as being used for private hires such as wedding receptions. It is also the location of the Parish Office which is open between 10 am and 12 noon Monday to Thursday. The Community Room is located adjacent to the school and provides an additional meeting room used by a number of local groups including a monthly community café.

== Sports and recreation ==
The village has a cricket club with its own grounds and cricket pavilion. Adjacent to the Brooklands Centre off the Brook, the Parish Council provides playing fields, a multi-use games area and a sports pavilion used by local football teams and other local sports groups. The village bowls club green is also next to the sports pavilion. In nearby Stirling Way the Parish Council provides a children's play area. Elsewhere on the south side of the village is the Recreation Ground, previously used for organised sporting events but now used as an informal recreation and dog walking area.

== New developments ==
Linden Homes submitted a major planning application early in 2017. Concerns were raised about the impact of this development on village services such as the school and the GP surgery. East Cambridgeshire District Council refused an initial application for 77 homes but Linden Homes subsequently took this to appeal and were successful. Those homes have been constructed and occupied. A further application for a further 173 homes has been approved by the District Council. This will lead to an overall development of 250 homes in accordance with the Neighbourhood Plan. As part of the planning agreement for the development, funding will be provided for local education and highways, as well as an upgrade to the existing multi-use games area in the village. The agreement also includes the provision of land for a burial ground as well as additional sports pitches.

== Wider parish ==
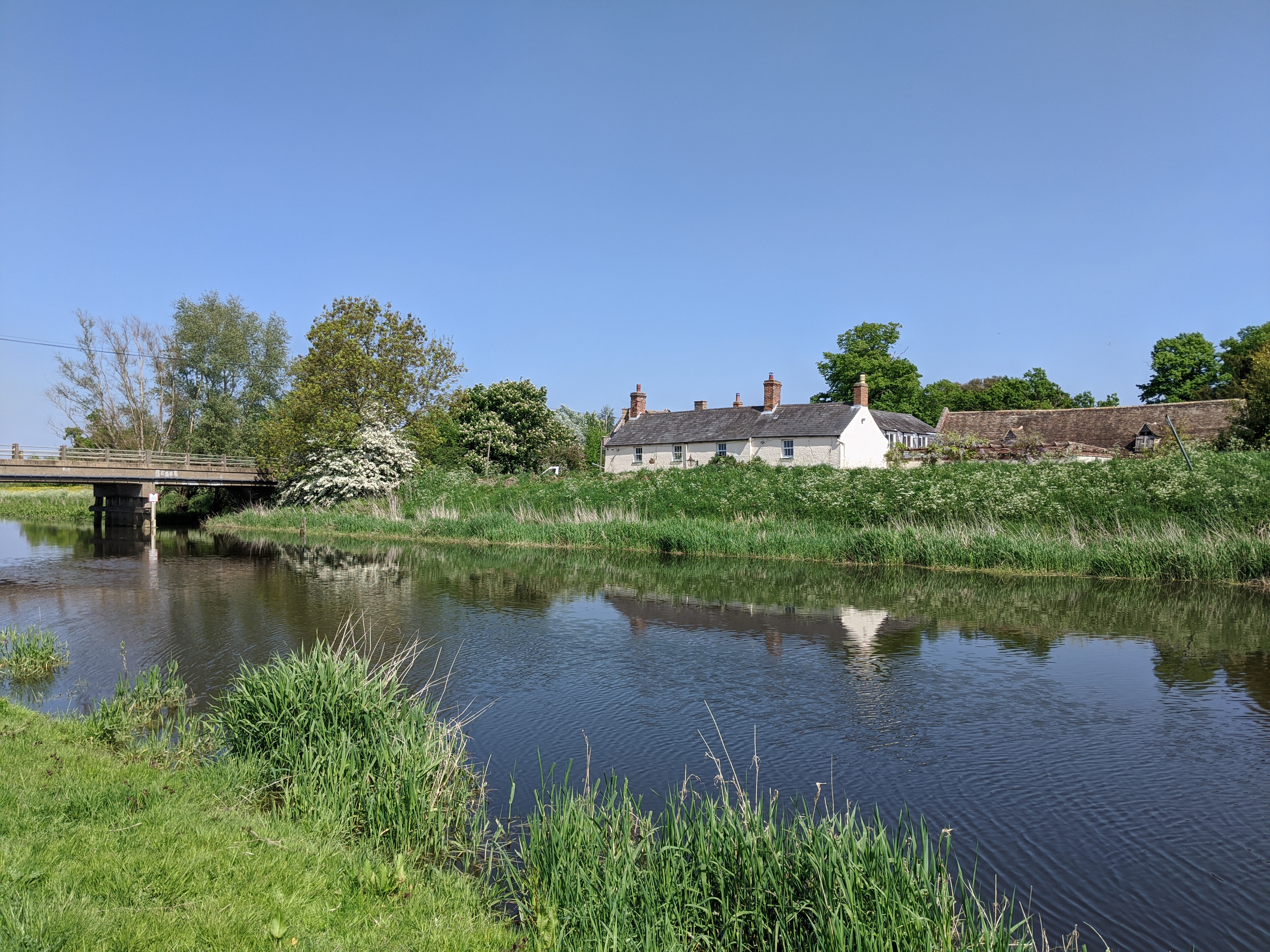
Bridge over the New Bedford River and the Anchor at Sutton Gault

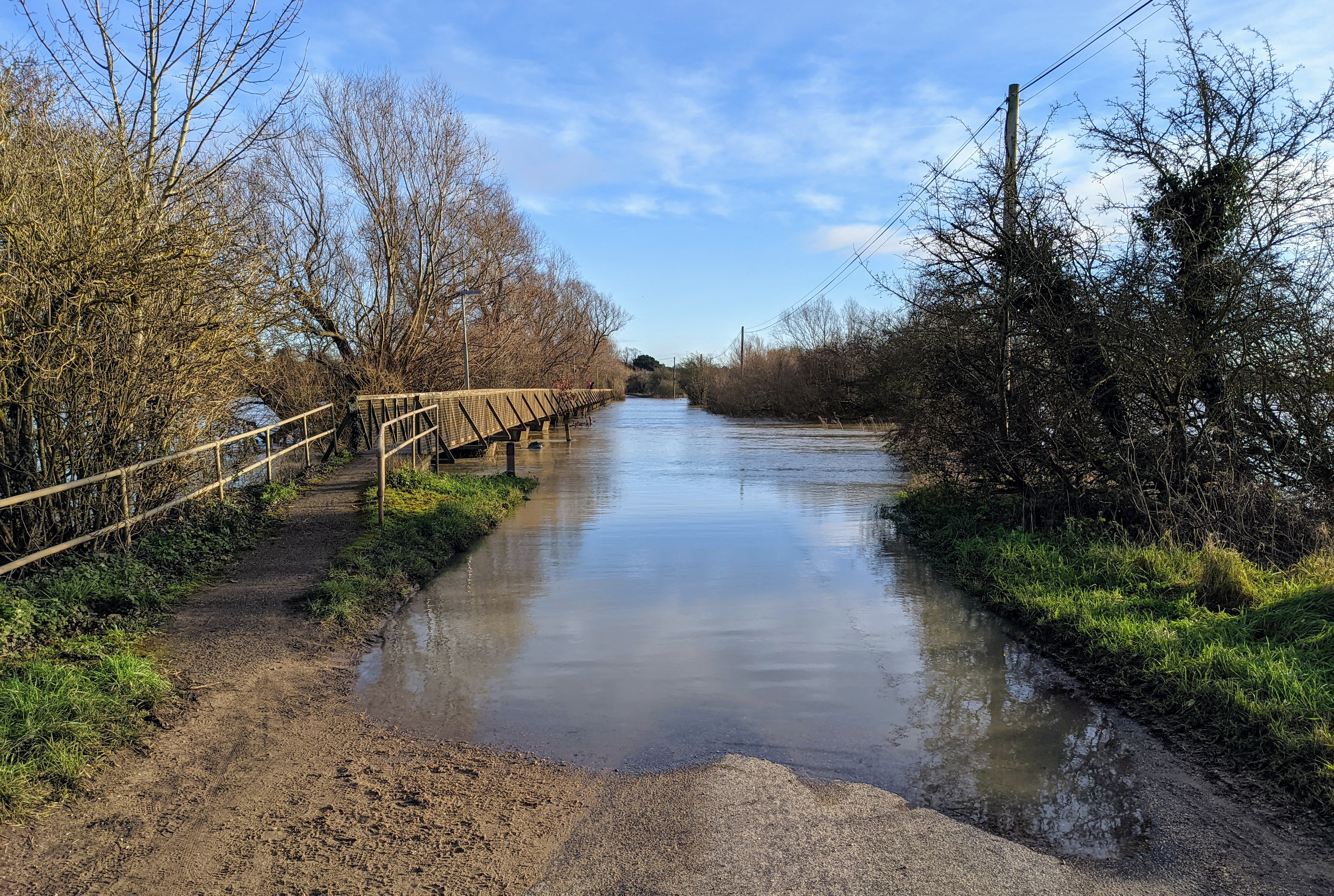
Flooded road at Sutton Gault

Sutton Gault (Bury Lane) is a part of the parish of Sutton-in-the-Isle. The name derives from the gault clay that has been extracted from there. It comprises a few houses and farms, a former guest home, "Grove Barn" and a former inn, "The Anchor". The Old Bedford River and New Bedford River pass through Sutton Gault. The land between them, known as the Ouse Washes, a giant flood water reservoir which also forms part of an internationally important wetland habitat. When the flood water is very high the road through the Washes is impassible and closed to traffic.

The Americas, also known as The America or just America, is another part of the parish. Although it is treated as a separate settlement from the village of Sutton-in-the-Isle on some maps, most residents consider it part of the village and the equivalent of a street name. So far the origins of the name remain a mystery. It is known to have had its name since at least 1881 as it is mentioned in the census of that year, although the name could be much older.
