= Haddenham railway station (Cambridgeshire) =

Railway station in Haddenham, Cambridgeshire

Haddenham
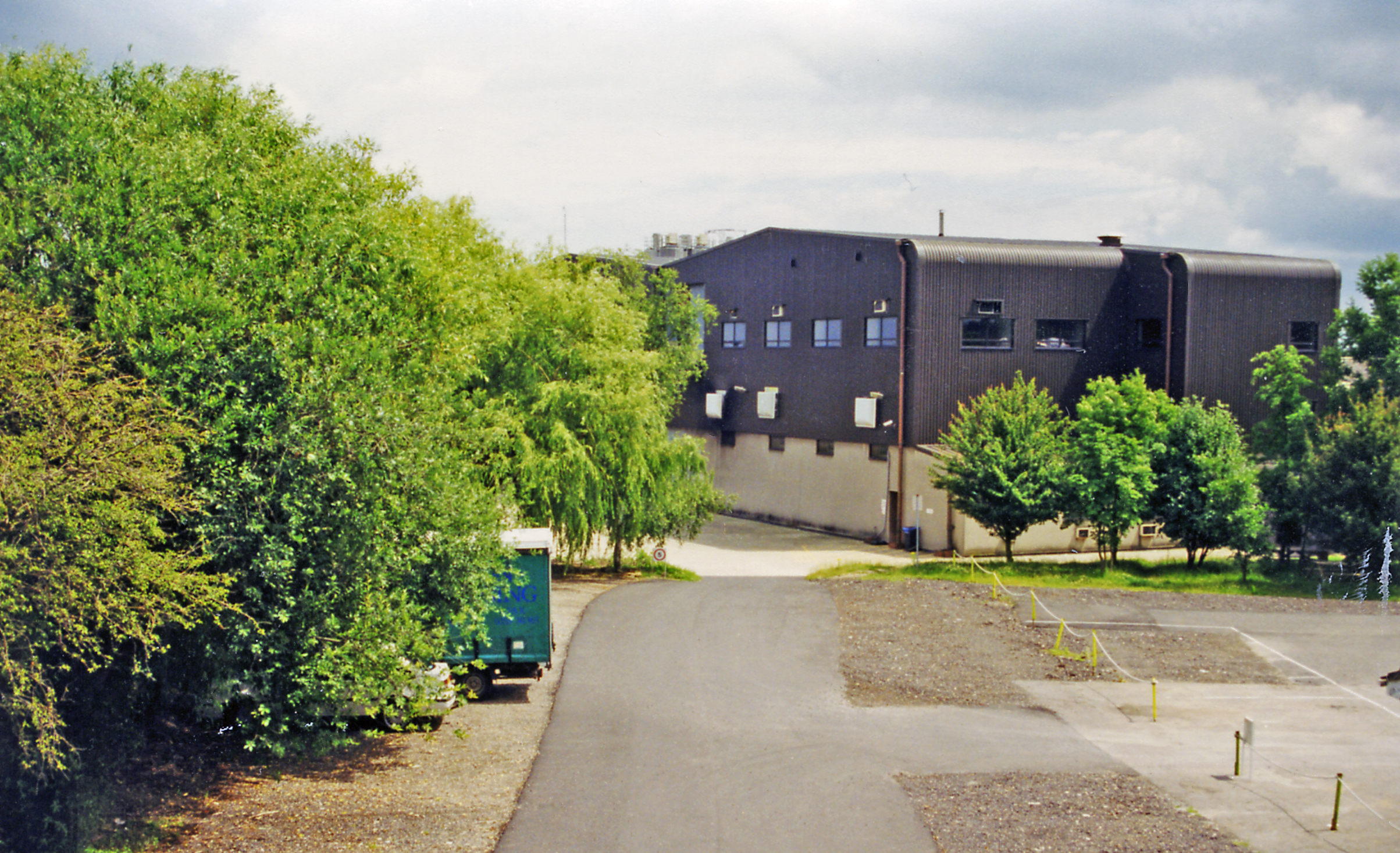
- The site of the station in 1998

General information
- Location: Haddenham, East Cambridgeshire; England
- Coordinates: 52.3654°N 0.1516°E
- Platforms: 1

Other information
- Status: Disused

History
- Original company: Ely and St Ives Railway
- Pre-grouping: Great Eastern Railway
- Post-grouping: London and North Eastern Railway

Key dates
- 16 April 1866: Opened
- 2 February 1931: Closed to passengers
- 13 July 1964: Closed
Location

Haddenham railway station was a station in Haddenham, Cambridgeshire. It was first opened in 1866 by the Ely, Haddenham and Sutton Railway. It closed to passengers in 1931 through it continued to be served by occasional passenger excursion trains until 1958 and goods trains until full closure in 1964.

The station was one of the main goods yards on the line and featured a single platform, signal box, through goods shed and a number of sidings.

Former Services

Preceding station	Disused railways	Following station
Sutton	Great Eastern Railway; Ely and St Ives Railway	Wilburton
