= Mark Ridley (physician) =

English physician and lexicographer (1560 – c. 1624)

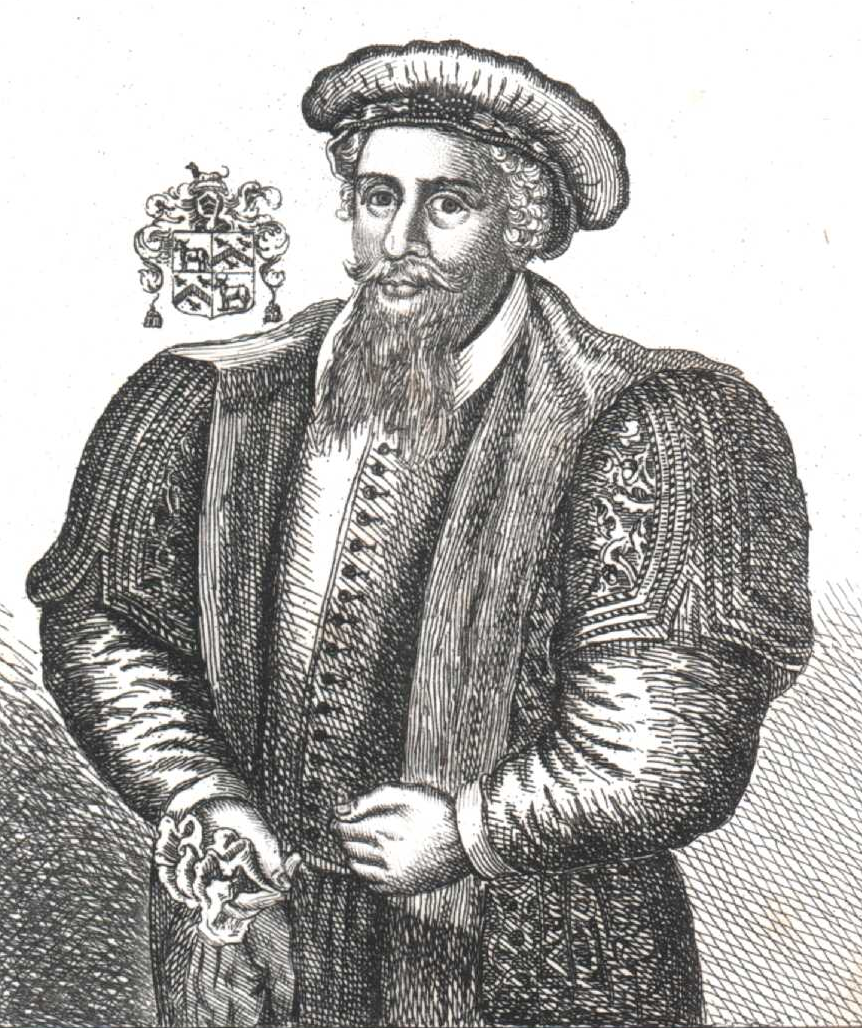
Portrait of Mark Ridley. Etching, published by William Richardson

Mark Ridley (1560 – c. 1624) was an English physician and lexicographer, born in Stretham, Cambridgeshire, to Lancelot Ridley. Following studies at Cambridge, Ridley was employed by the Muscovy Company as physician to the English merchants in Russia. Later, he became personal physician to Tsar Feodor I of Russia.

== Ridley's Russian dictionary ==
While living in Russia between 1594 and 1599, he compiled two manuscript dictionaries of Russian: a Russian-English dictionary of 7,203 entries entitled A dictionarie of the vulgar Russe tongue and an English-Russian dictionary of 8,113 entries entitled A dictionarie of the Englishe before the vulger Russe tonnge. The former includes a short grammar of Russian on the first eight folios. Both dictionaries are now held at the Bodleian Library at the University of Oxford (MSS Laud misc. 47a and 47b). After his return from Russia he also wrote two books on magnetism.

The dictionary's prime significance is in recording the spoken Russian language of that era: the written language differed considerably in its vocabulary and grammar under the strong literary influence of the Orthodox church texts. So lexica compiled by foreign business visitors to Russia reflected the actual Russian language use that they had encountered through daily interaction. Whereas study of the written tradition has a multitude of preserved texts available, study of the spoken language by foreigners were not influenced by local stylistic and other constraints.

This thesis was applied in the works of Prof. B. A. Larin (1937, 1948, 1959) and others. The manuscript of the Ridley dictionary was originally reviewed by Simmons and Unbegaun (1951, 1962), Unbegaun (1963) from Oxford University, and later studied by a team from Kazan State University in Russia (Galiullin and Zagidullin, 1996, 1997). The manuscript was published in 1996 as A Dictionarie of the Vulgar Russe Tonge: attributed to Mark Ridley / edited from the late-sixteenth-century manuscripts and with an introduction by Gerald Stone by Bohlau Verlag, thanks to the editorial work of Gerald Stone.

The Kazan research team in 1994–2000 conducted extensive comparative analysis of the dictionary materials in relation to the existing dictionaries of Russian language of the 16th century. This work awaits publication. Their studies have confirmed the historical value of the dictionary in several aspects. The correspondence of most of the material to existing records points to the reliability of Ridley's linguistic observations. It has permitted significant chronological corrections and expansion of the semantics of particular words when there were discrepancies with the major Russian historical dictionaries. Mark Ridley's dictionary included a sizeable number of words or phrases never recorded before (2249 entries out of total 6975).

Other studies of the Ridley dictionary include those of Konnova (2000) on his medical terminology.

== Magnetics ==
Whilst Ridley's Russian dictionaries are more original, he is best known as an innovative follower of Dr William Gilbert (1544–1603) and the magnetic science that Gilbert published in his De Magnete of 1600. Until Gilbert's death in 1603 Ridley had lodged with him in Wingfield House, London. In 1613 Ridley published his Magneticall Bodies and Motions, the first printed English work to promote Gilbert's ideas. Ridley was attacked by the conservative Revd William Barlow for advancing Gilbert's Copernican astronomy, and in Barlow's opinion, for plagiarizing his own version in English of Gilbert's magnetic science.
