= Earith Bridge railway station =

Earith, Cambridgeshire on the Ely and St Ives Railway

Earith Bridge
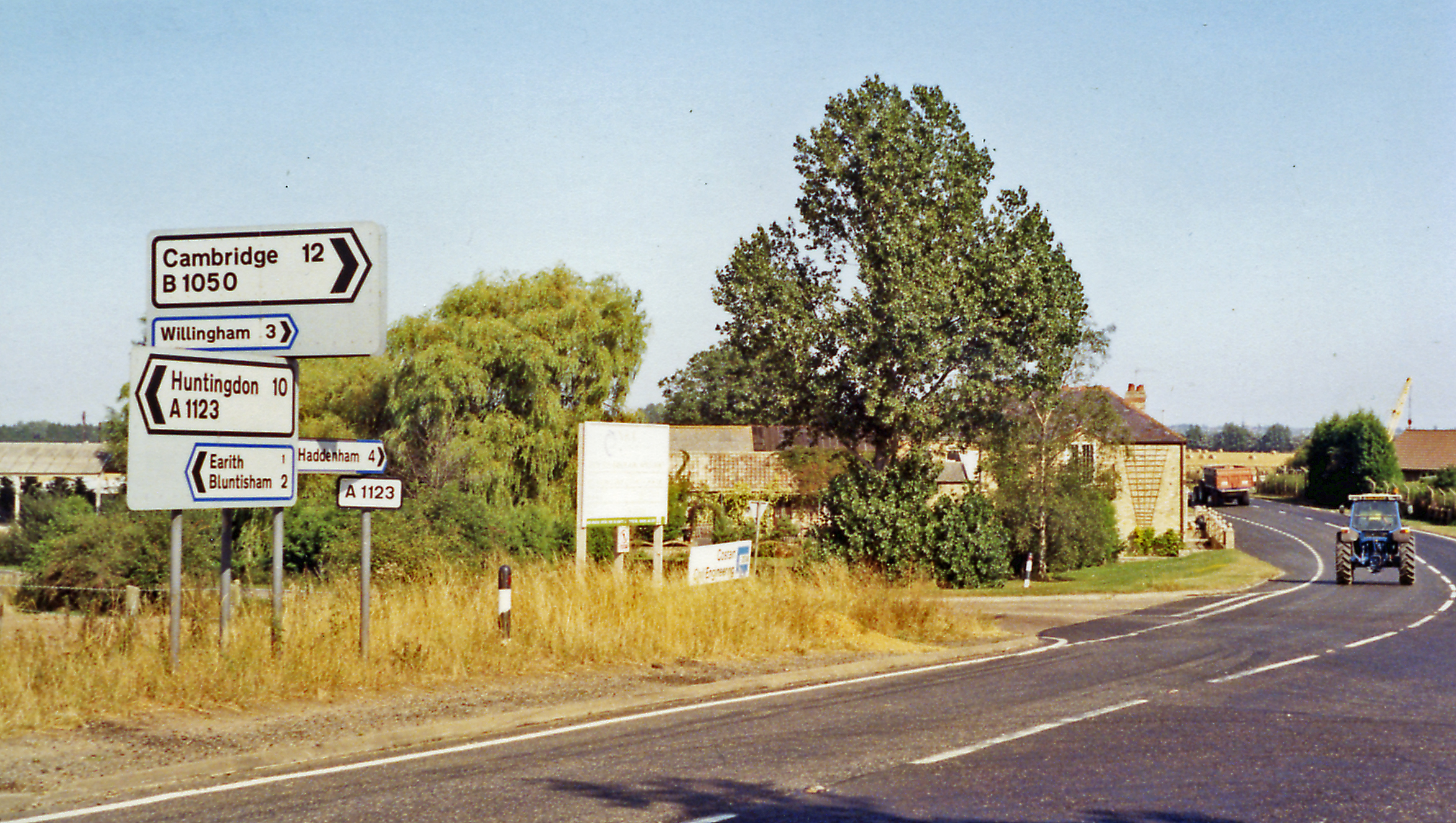
- Earith Bridge station site

General information
- Location: Earith, East Cambridgeshire; England
- Coordinates: 52.3522°N 0.0467°E
- Platforms: 1

Other information
- Status: Disused

History
- Original company: Ely and St Ives Railway
- Pre-grouping: Great Eastern Railway
- Post-grouping: London and North Eastern Railway

Key dates
- 10 May 1878: Opened
- 2 February 1931: Closed to passengers
- 6 October 1958: Closed
Location

Earith Bridge railway station was a station in Earith, Cambridgeshire on the Ely and St Ives Railway. It was closed to regular passenger trains in 1931 but occasional excursions used it until 1958.

The station had a single platform, a signal box, and a goods loop.

Preceding station	Disused railways	Following station
Bluntisham	Great Eastern Railway; Ely and St Ives Railway	Sutton
