= Henry Baber =

English philologist

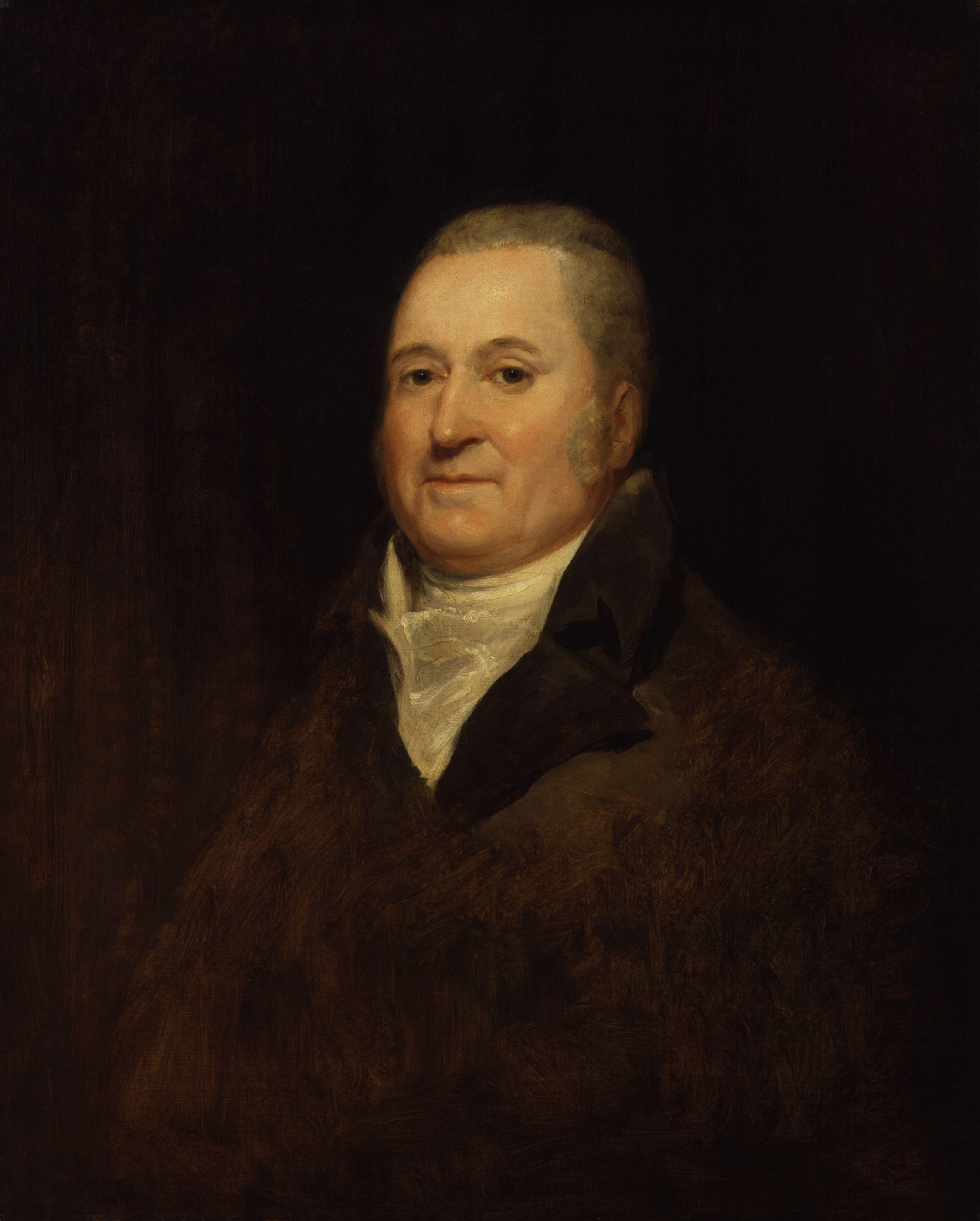
- Portrait of Henry Hervey Baber by an unknown artist, oil on canvas, circa 1830, National Portrait Gallery, London
- Born: 1775; Slingsby, North Yorkshire, England
- Died: 28 March 1869 (aged 94)
- Education: St Paul's School, London, All Souls College, Oxford
- Occupation: philologist
- Known for: Assistant Librarian at the British Museum
- Notable work: Librorum Impressorum Qui in Museo Britannico Adservantur Catalogus ...
- Spouse: Ann Smith (m. 1809)
- Children: 2 sons, 3 daughters
- Parents: Thomas Baber (father); Elizabeth (née Berriman) Baber (mother)

Henry Hervey Baber (1775 – 28 March 1869) was an English philologist.

He was born in Slingsby, Yorkshire, the second son of Thomas, a London Attorney of the Inner Temple, and Elizabeth (née Berriman) Baber and was educated at St Paul's School, London. He entered All Souls College, Oxford, and graduated MA in 1805.

After working for a while as a sub-librarian at the Bodleian Library, Oxford, he became in 1807 Assistant Librarian at the British Museum. In 1812 he was promoted to Keeper of the Printed Books. The crown rewarded him with the rectory of St James' Church, Stretham, Cambridgeshire in 1827, for his work on a three-volume edition of the Old Testament part of the Codex Alexandrinus. He was elected in May 1816 a Fellow of the Royal Society

When the museum trustees decided in 1837 that their staff should no longer hold other remunerated posts, Baber resigned from his museum post but remained rector of Stretham until his death aged 94. He had married in 1809 Ann Smith, the daughter of Harry Smith. They had two sons and three daughters.

His published works include:

- Librorum Impressorum Qui in Museo Britannico Adservantur Catalogus ... (Latin Edition) – Paperback (26 February 2010) by Henry Ellis, Henry Hervey Baber
- The New Testament: Translated From The Latin in the Year 1380 By John Wiclif (1810) – Hardcover (23 May 2010) by John Wycliffe and Henry Hervey Baber
