= Ely and St Ives Railway =

Overview
- Status: lifted
- Locale: Cambridgeshire, England

Service
- Operator: Great Eastern Railway

History
- Opened: 11 May 1878
- Closed: 5 October 1964

Technical
- Line length: 17.75 mi (28.57 km)
- Track gauge: 4 ft 8 1/2 in (1,435 mm) standard gauge

The Ely and St Ives Railway was a railway company that opened a line between those places (in Cambridgeshire, England) in 1878. It was an extension of the privately promoted Ely, Haddenham and Sutton Railway that had opened in 1866. It was a standard gauge single track. The line was worked by the neighbouring Great Eastern Railway but it was never profitable. The development of road transport services in the 1920s caused a steep decline in use of the line, and the passenger service was withdrawn in 1931. A goods service continued, but the line closed completely in 1964. No railway activity takes place on the route now.

== Origins ==
Ely and Huntingdon Railway Act 1845
- Act of Parliament
- Parliament of the United Kingdom
- Long title: An Act for making a Railway from Ely to Huntingdon.
- Citation: 8 & 9 Vict. c. xlviii

Dates
- Royal assent: 30 June 1845

Other legislation
- Repealed by: Great Eastern Railway Act 1862

Status: Repealed

Ely and Huntingdon Railway Act 1846
- Act of Parliament
- Parliament of the United Kingdom
- Long title: An Act to amend the Ely and Huntingdon Railway Act.
- Citation: 9 & 10 Vict. c. cclxx

Dates
- Royal assent: 27 July 1846

Other legislation
- Repealed by: Great Eastern Railway Act 1862

Status: Repealed

Ely and Huntingdon Railway Act 1849
- Act of Parliament
- Parliament of the United Kingdom
- Long title: An Act for extending the Time and Powers for making the Ely and Huntingdon Railway, and for amending the Act relating to the East Anglian Railways.
- Citation: 12 & 13 Vict. c. lii

Dates
- Royal assent: 13 July 1849

Other legislation
- Amends: East Anglian Railways Act 1847
- Repealed by: Great Eastern Railway Act 1862

Status: Repealed

Text of statute as originally enacted

The Eastern Counties Railway opened its line from Cambridge to Ely in 1845. The Ely and Huntingdon Railway was authorised by the Ely and Huntingdon Railway Act 1845 (8 & 9 Vict. c. xlviii); it was to build from east to west through St Ives, but it was unable to raise sufficient money to build the whole of its line. Instead it opened only between St Ives and a station named Huntingdon, that was actually in Godmanchester, east of the River Great Ouse. The opening date was 17 August 1847, and the Eastern Counties Railway between Cambridge and St Ives was opened on the same day.

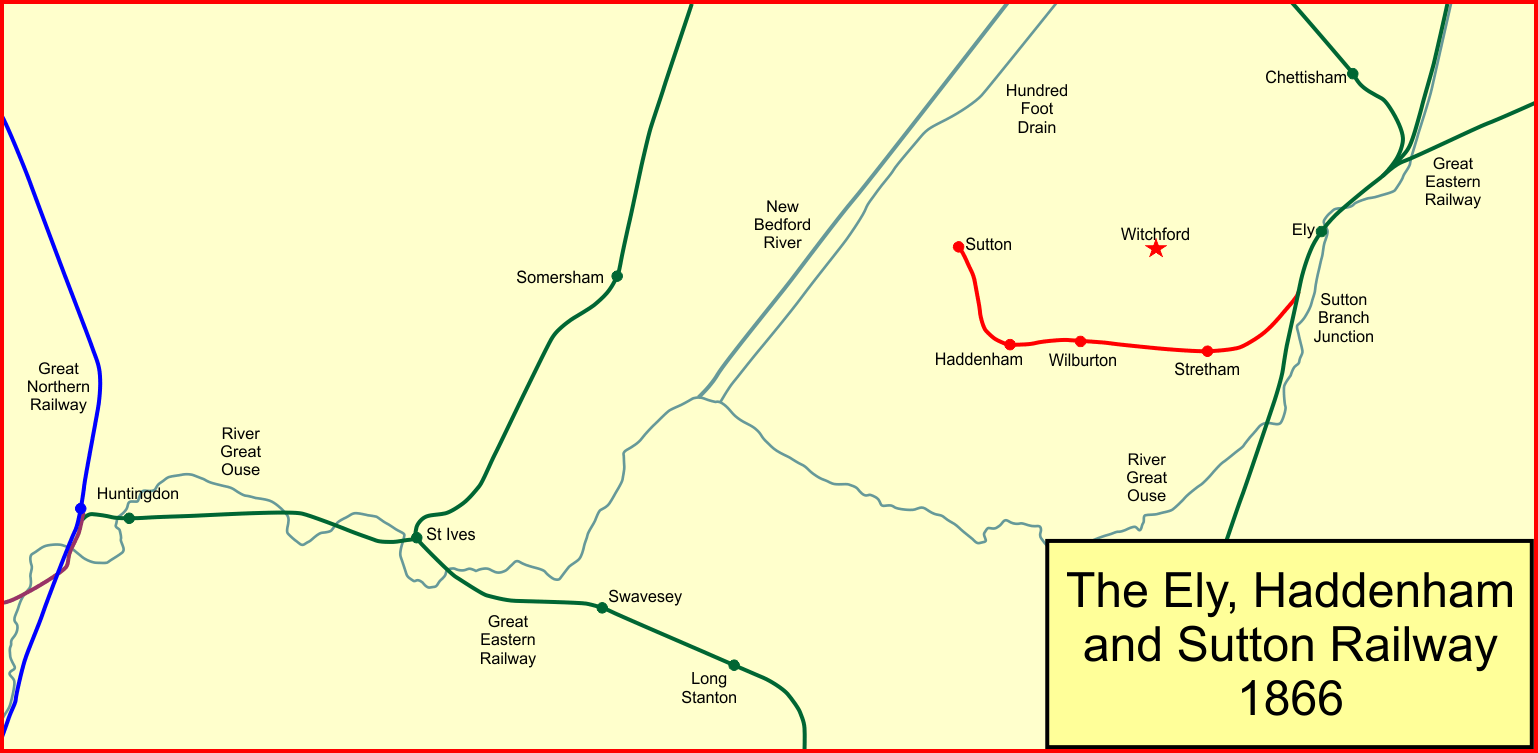
The Ely, Haddenham and Sutton Railway

The East Anglian Railways soon acquired the Ely and Huntingdon Railway, but it did not consider that progressing the completion of the Ely and Huntingdon scheme was worthwhile, and it allowed the powers to lapse. In August 1862 the Eastern Counties Railway merged with other lines to form the Great Eastern Railway; this heralded a change of policy in that the Great Eastern Railway decided to encourage local schemes for connecting and feeder railways.

Accordingly in the Autumn of 1863 two prominent landowners, Oliver Claude Pell of Wilburton and Frederick Camps of Haddenham, generated enough support from other landowners in the area to consider building a line linking Ely and Sutton, about a third of the extent of the unbuilt Ely to St Ives line. The route was planned at first to be direct via Witchford, but Pell and Camps insisted on a route further south to serve their estates and the planned route of the line was altered accordingly. This had the incidental benefit of aligning the route on lower ground throughout, with easy gradients. The line was to be known as the Ely, Haddenham and Sutton Railway.

The Great Eastern Railway considered assisting the promoters of the Ely, Haddenham and Sutton Railway, but they were sceptical about its potential profitability. Now the local company proposed an extension from Sutton to Somersham on the St Ives to March line and this changed the GER position, as they saw this as a threat to their strategic intentions, potentially facilitating an incursion by the Great Northern Railway.

== Authorisation ==
Ely, Haddenham and Sutton Railway Act 1864
- Act of Parliament
- Parliament of the United Kingdom
- Long title: An Act to authorize the Construction of a Railway from Ely, through Haddenham, to Sutton, in Cambridgeshire.
- Citation: 27 & 28 Vict. c. lxxxvi

Dates
- Royal assent: 23 June 1864

Text of statute as originally enacted

The GER were therefore anxious to dissuade the local company from the Somersham extension, and they offered to support the local scheme to the extent of one third of the required capital if they would drop it. This was agreed to, and the Ely, Haddenham and Sutton Railway got its act of Parliament, the Ely, Haddenham and Sutton Railway Act 1864 (27 & 28 Vict. c. lxxxvi), on 23 June 1864. Share capital was £36,000 with borrowing powers of £12,000. The GER was authorised to subscribe £12,000, and the EH&SR had running powers to enter Ely station.

A construction contract was let to W S Simpson of Ely in the sum of £48,000; early in 1866 the EH&SR agreed a working arrangement with the GER, for 50% of gross receipts.

== Opening ==
Captain Tyler made an inspection of the line for the Board of Trade on 28 March 1866. He identified numerous shortcomings, and permission for opening to passenger trains was refused. Urgent improvements were put in hand, and Tyler authorised opening on 7 July 1866 subject to completion of certain final rectification. The formal opening of the line took place on 6 April 1866, and the full public opening was on 16 April 1866.

At a shareholders' meeting in September 1866, the directors reported that receipts had been disappointing due to cattle plague, which had been prevalent in the area: passenger receipts from the opening until 30 June were £161, and the total for all traffic was £366. By the end of June 1867, £49,679 had been expended on the building of the railway and associated work. A 2% dividend was declared at the first half yearly meeting in 1868.

Passenger carryings were meagre; Gordon attributes this to the fact that "third-class facilities were restricted to the Parliamentary trains [once daily], and the normal fare from Ely to Sutton [7 miles] was 2s at a time when local wages were under 10s a week."

In May 1868 the GER informed the company that in the previous year the line had operated at a loss of £1,211. The GER demanded an increase in the charge for the working of the line but the EH&SR refused, saying that the ten-year working agreement was a firm contractual commitment and must stand.

== Extending to St Ives ==
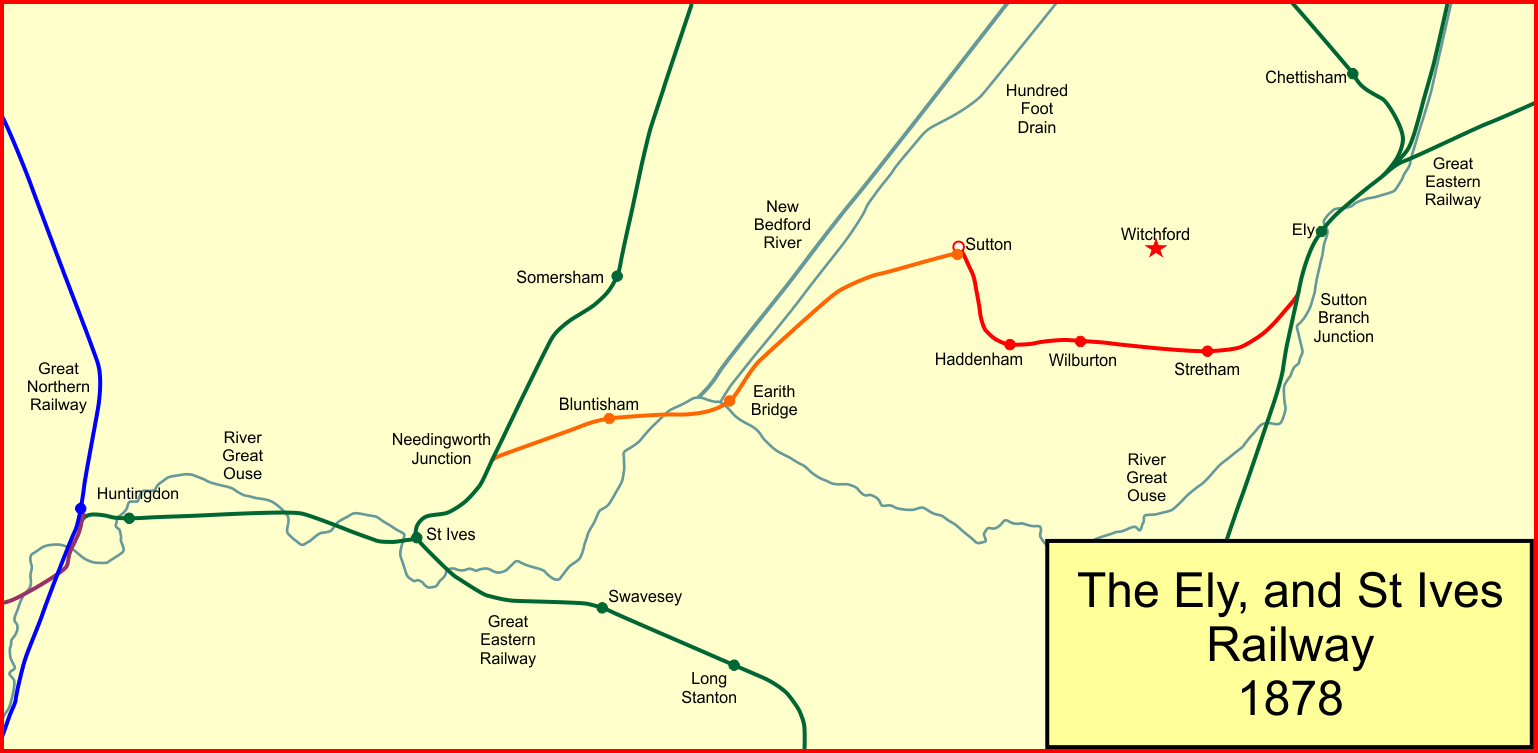
The Ely and St Ives Railway

The idea of an extension beyond Sutton to St Ives was revived again in 1872. The GER feared an incursion by the Great Northern Railway: the GNR had a lease of the Somersham to Ramsey branch until 1864. The possibility of the GNR using its own Ramsey branch as a springboard to get to Somersham and then to Ely was an ever-present danger to the GER. To ward this off, the GER planned an extension to St Ives for the 1876 session of Parliament; the cost was to be £62,928.

Ely, Haddenham, and Sutton Railway Extension Act 1876
- Act of Parliament
- Parliament of the United Kingdom
- Long title: An Act to authorize The Ely, Haddenham and Sutton Railway Company to extend their authorized Railway to the Saint Ives and March Railway of the Great Eastern Railway; to change their name; and for other Purposes.
- Citation: 39 & 40 Vict. c.vi

Dates
- Royal assent: 7 April 1876

Text of statute as originally enacted

The Ely, Haddenham, and Sutton Railway Extension Act 1876 (39 & 40 Vict. c.vi) was passed on 7 April 1876; the act authorised £60,000 in share capital and borrowing powers of £20,000. The EH&SR was also authorised to change its name to the Ely and St Ives Railway when the extension was open for traffic.

William T. Mousley got the contract for construction of the line, having tendered £17,840; materials, land etc were to be supplied by the GER. The GER was authorised to lease the company on a 999 year lease, and it would pay 4% on the £36,000 ordinary stock and 5% on the £60,000 extension stock.

Major-General Hutchinson inspected the line for the Board of Trade on 3 May 1878, and with minor criticisms, he approved the opening of the line to passenger traffic. It opened on 10 May 1878. It was leased to the GER for 999 years, authorised by the Great Eastern Railway Act 1879 (42 & 43 Vict. c. cl) of 21 July 1879; the GER guaranteed interest of 2% per annum on the £38,000 ordinary shares and 5% on the £60,000 extension stock; the former was to be raised to 4% from 1881.

From this time the Ely and St Ives Railway Company was simply a financial organisation, and the GER acquired it on 2 Dec 1896. The sale price was £128,000 in GER 4% debenture stock. The last board meeting of the Ely and St Ives Railway was on 3 August 1898.

== After 1900 ==
In the 1920s fruit production gained in importance locally; a former station master at Stretham reminisced that "It was a time when... trainloads of fruit pickers would arrive to be taken to their primitive camps in the nearby fields."

Following World War I a local bus service was started in the area in 1919; the competition was an immediate blow to passenger carryings on the line; in addition there was a general depression in the agricultural sector in the locality, and financial losses were heavy. In an attempt to reduce costs, the conductor-guard system was introduced on passenger trains from December 1922, and booking offices at most stations were closed. So that the conductor-guard could patrol the whole train to take fares, six-wheel coaches were modified with centre gangways within the coaches and doors at end for the conductor-guard to use.

The omnibus services gained in strength and were disastrous for the line: in 1928 only £7,562 was taken on the line from passengers. The passenger service could not sustain the losses, and it was closed on 2 February 1931, although half-day excursions to London and elsewhere were subsequently run sporadically.

On 6 October 1958 Earith Bridge was closed and the line from Sutton to Earith Bridge station was kept in use as a siding. Sugar beet traffic sustained the line for the time being, and the line from Ely to Sutton remained in use until 13 July 1964. From St Ives (Needingworth Junction) to the mill at Bluntisham was closed on 5 October 1964.

== Train services ==
There were typically three return passenger train trips daily between Ely and St Ives, stopping at all stations; there was an additional return trip on Mondays and Thursdays. The time between Ely and St Ives was about 45 minutes.

Sutton and Haddenham were the busiest stations but there were few passengers overall. In 1927 the line recorded 15,000 passengers and ran 2,100 passenger trains, an average of only seven or eight passengers per train.

The goods traffic in the early years was chiefly wheat, coal and potatoes, but in the 1890s fruit became more prominent. Haddenham and Sutton were the main goods yards with extensive sidings. Sugar beet was also transported to the mill at Ely.

== Location list ==
Stations from Stretham to Sutton were opened 16 April 1866. Earith Bridge and Bluntisham stations opened on 10 May 1878 and Sutton station was relocated on the same day. All the stations closed to passengers on 2 February 1931; there was some subsequent use for excursions, but it is not recorded whether all the stations were used for the purpose.

Trains for the branch left Ely in a southerly direction and diverged westward at Sutton Branch Junction. The first station was Stretham; an editor writing in 2007 stated that the station building could still be seen on Stretham Station Road. Wilburton was the next station; the station building had been incorporated into a much enlarged private house. Haddenham followed, and the site was then used as an industrial estate, on the present day A1421 road between Haddenham and Sutton-in-the-Isle. At Haddenham, the railway made a sharp curve to the north.

Sutton station served the village of Sutton-in-the-Isle. When it was the terminus of the Ely, Haddenham and Sutton Railway, it ended in a northward direction. When the line was extended to Ely, the line diverged a short distance south of the former terminus, which became a goods yard. The new passenger station was a little way to the south-west of the former station, and the access road from the village was extended to reach it. Remains of the freight shed still existed in 2007, in private ownership. The line now ran west and then south-west to the next station, Earith Bridge. The station could not be located close to Earith village because of the dykes at the Old Bedford River and New Bedford River. Instead, the line ran south of the village near to the present-day marinas. The final station was Bluntisham. It was still extant in 2007 and was in use as a private dwelling.

The line ended at Needingworth Junction, where it converged with the line from March, running south to St Ives station.

The point to point distances were

- Ely station to Sutton branch junction: 1 mile 2 chains;
- Stretham 1 mi 65 ch;
- Wilburton 1 mi 77 ch;
- Haddenham 1 mi 7 ch;
- Sutton 1 mi 56 ch;
- Earith Bridge 4 mi 37 ch;
- Bluntisham 1 mi 78 ch;
- Needingworth Junction 1 mi 76 ch;
- St Ives 1 mi 68 ch.
