= A120 road =

Road in the east of England

Coordinates: 51.87626°N 0.67381°E

A120

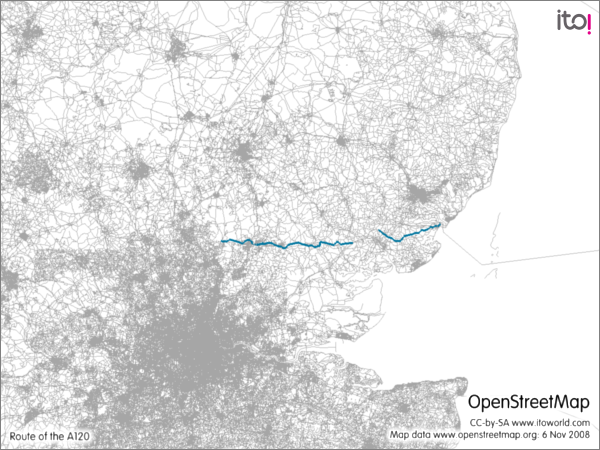
- Route of the A120 from OpenStreetMap

Route information
- Part of E32

Major junctions
- West end: Puckeridge
- A10 A1184 A1250 M11 Junctions 8 and 8A A131; A12 Junctions 25 and 29 A1232 A133 A136
- East end: Harwich

Location
- Country: United Kingdom
- Primary destinations: Stansted Airport; Colchester

Road network
- Roads in the United Kingdom; Motorways; A and B road zones
← A119	→ A121

The A120 is an A-road in England, which runs between Puckeridge in Hertfordshire and Harwich in Essex.

Along its route, the A120 bypasses the towns of Bishop's Stortford, Great Dunmow, Braintree, Coggeshall, Colchester and Dovercourt. The route meets the A10, A131, A12 and A133 primary routes and the M11 motorway. London Stansted Airport sits directly north of the route on the Essex and Hertfordshire border. Harwich International Port, a North Sea seaport at the mouth of the River Stour, lies north of the A120 near Harwich.

Part of the route constitutes Euroroute E32, between the A12 (E30) at Colchester and Harwich International Port.

== Route ==
=== Hertfordshire ===
At its western terminus, the A120 meets the A10 at a roundabout south-west of Puckeridge. The A10 runs southbound towards Hertford and London, and northbound towards Royston and Cambridge.

Carried by Standon Hill, the A120 passes along the southern perimeter of Puckeridge and into the village of Standon. The route then continues towards Little Hadham, which it bypasses to the north, before reaching a roundabout with the A1184 and A1250 to the west of Bishop's Stortford. The town is bypassed to the north by the A120, crossing the River Stort and entering the county of Essex.

The route is managed by Hertfordshire County Council.

=== Essex ===
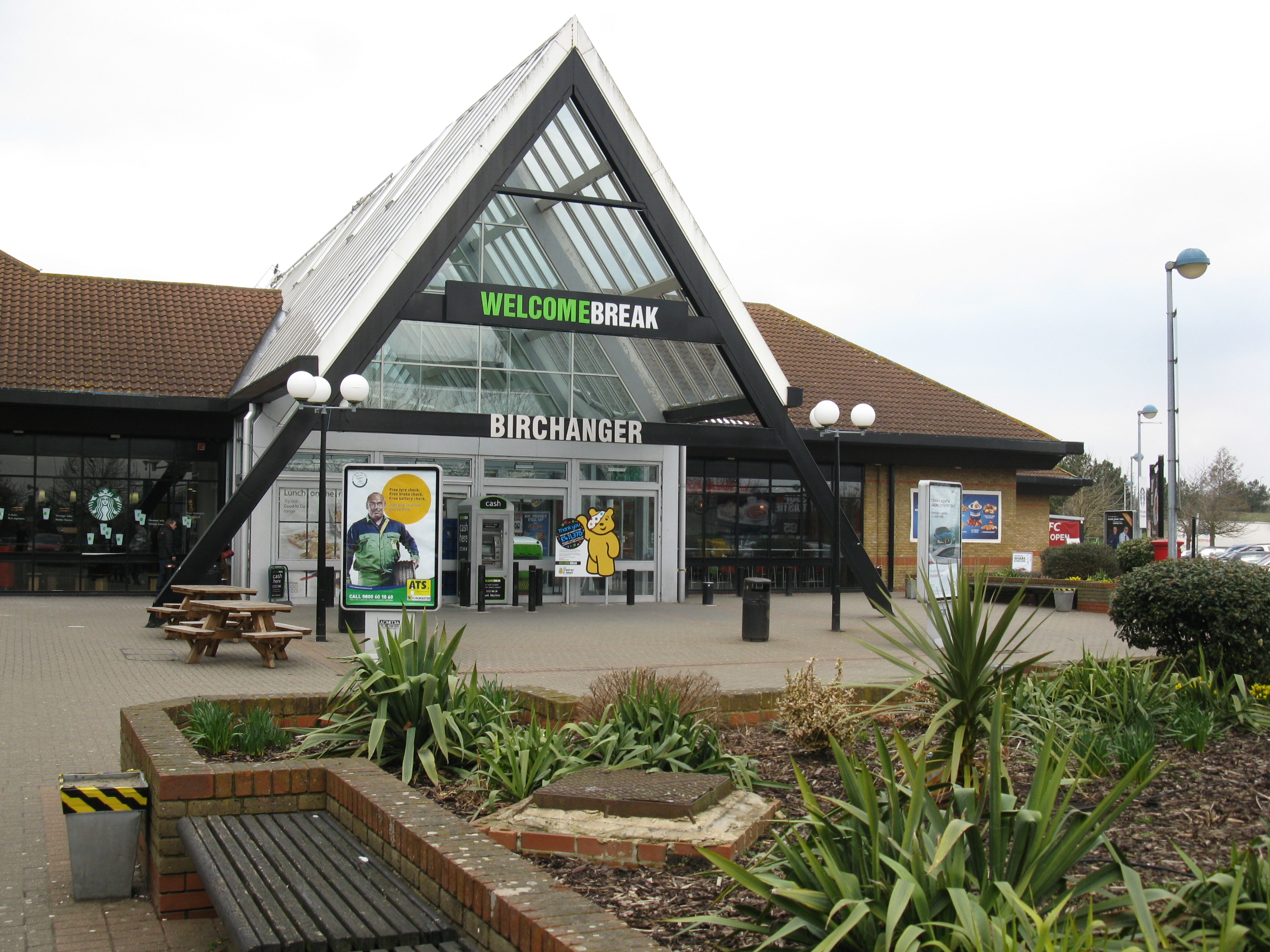
Birchanger Green service station at M11 motorway junction 8 (with the A120)

Entering Essex to the north of Bishop's Stortford and south of Stansted Mountfitchet, the A120 meets the B1383 Stansted Road at a roundabout. The route continues to bypass the north-eastern portion of Bishop's Stortford before meeting the A1250 Dunmow Road, then the M11 motorway at junction 8. The motorway runs southbound towards Harlow and London, and northbound towards Newmarket and Cambridge. Birchanger Green service station is accessed from the junction 8 roundabout. The roundabout also provides access to the B1256 towards Takeley and Little Canfield.

East of the M11 motorway, the A120 carries traffic to Priory Wood Roundabout. The roundabout provides direct access to the M11 motorway southbound, which joins the main carriageway at junction 8A, and to Round Coppice Road (northbound to Stansted Business Park, Stansted Mountfitchet and Elsenham). Direct access to the A120 eastbound is provided from the M11 northbound at junction 8A, on a carriageway which passes over the top of Priory Wood Roundabout (and vice versa for A120 westbound/M11 southbound traffic).

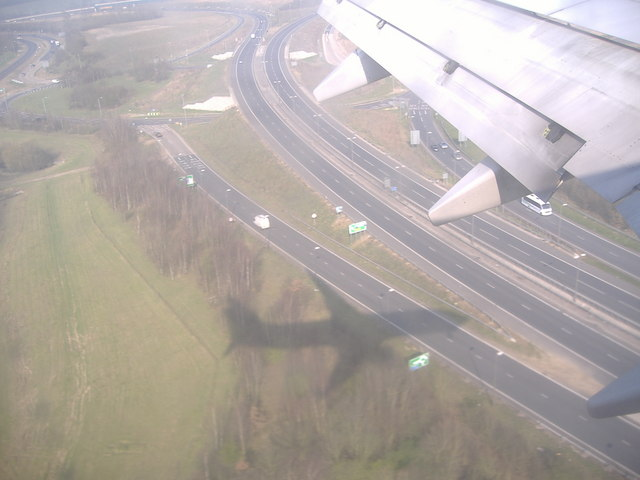
The A120 as viewed from an aeroplane landing at London Stansted Airport

A dual carriageway carries the A120 to Braintree, past Great Dunmow, with grade-separated junctions:

- Stansted Airport
- Dunmow West – B1256 Takeley, Little Canfield, Great Dunmow, Thaxted
- Dunmow South – B1008 (B184) Great Dunmow, Barnston
- B1417/B1256 – Felsted, Rayne
- Panners/Great Notley – A131 Chelmsford, Braintree
- King William – Braintree

The dual carriageway is broken at Galleys Corner, a roundabout with the B1018 (southbound to Witham), Cressing Road and Long Green. The roundabout sits to the south-east of Braintree. Access to Braintree Village, a shopping area, and Braintree Freeport railway station is via the B1018.

The A120 runs north–south along the eastern edge of Braintree town before reaching Marks Farm Roundabout. The north–south route continues as the A131 towards Halstead, Haverhill and Sudbury. Westbound from Marks Farm, the B1256 Coggeshall Road carries traffic into Braintree. The A120 resumes its east–west route along a single carriageway – which bypasses Coggeshall to the north – to Marks Tey.

At Marks Tey, the A12 meets the A120 at junction 25. The A12 runs southbound towards Kelvedon, Witham, Chelmsford and London, and northbound towards Colchester, Ipswich and Felixstowe. Marks Tey railway station, on the Great Eastern Main Line between London and Norwich, lies directly north-west of the junction.

A gap in the A120 is plugged by the A12 junctions 25–29, which runs to the north-west of Colchester.

The remainder of the A120 sits to the east of the A12 between Colchester and Harwich, meeting the London to Ipswich road at junction 29. At the junction, the A120 also meets A1232 Ipswich Road (southbound into Colchester). Along this section of the route, the A120 bypasses Elmstead, Wix, Ramsey and Dovercourt.

The A133 meets the A120 at a junction between Elmstead and Wix, which carries traffic towards Great Bentley, Weeley and Clacton-on-Sea.

Through the Dovercourt and Harwich towns, the B1352 runs roughly parallel to the A120. The B1352 meets the A120 at a roundabout near Ramsey and at the route's eastern terminus near Harwich Quay.

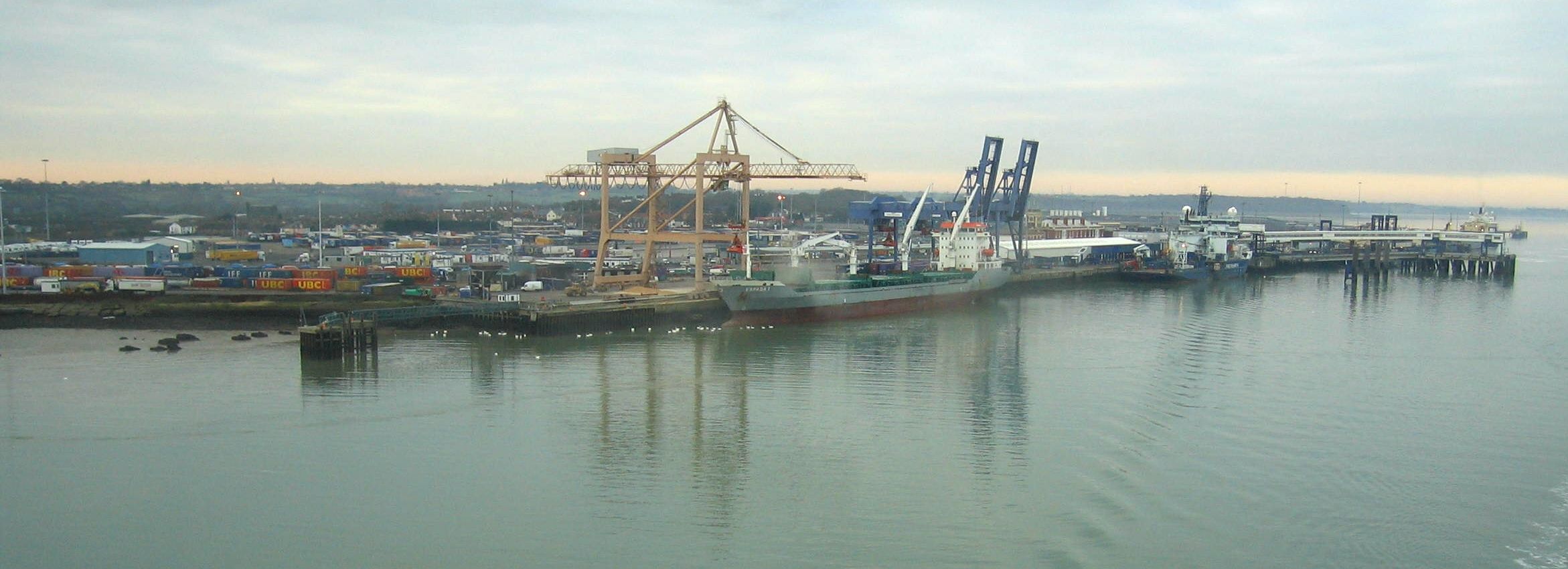
Harwich International Port, one of the A120's destinations

The A120 runs along the northern edge of both towns, meeting the A136 Parkeston Bypass for access to Harwich International Port and Harwich International railway station. The route then continues eastbound towards Harwich town centre and Harwich Navyard, past the Dovercourt and Harwich Town railway stations which lie directly south-east of the route.

The eastern terminus of the A120 is a roundabout with the B1352 West Street and The Quay. Navyard lies east of the A120's eastern terminus.

Within Essex, Essex County Council manages the A120 west of the M11 motorway, near Bishop's Stortford. National Highways is responsible for the remainder of the route.

== History ==
The Ministry of Transport's 1922 List of Class I and Class II Roads and Numbers listed the A120 as being the route Puckeridge – Bishop's Stortford – Great Dunmow – Braintree – Marks Tey.

=== Stane Street ===
The A120 roughly follows the path of the Stane Street Roman Road.

At its western end, Stane Street met Ermine Street, which ran north–south between Londinium (London), Lindum Colonia (Lincoln) and Eboracum (York). In the east, Stane Street's terminus was at Camulodunum (Colchester).

Archaeologists have uncovered Roman artefacts at several A120 towns.

In 2022, archaeologists unearthed Roman graves and evidence of a Roman settlement at Bishop's Stortford. Oxford Archaeologists, leading the project, described as a "once-in-a-lifetime discovery" and said evidence suggests the site was a major transport and trading post in the East of England.

Of Great Dunmow, a Heritage Gateway report notes:

"Excavations between 1968 and 1972 uncovered the remains of a minor Roman linear settlement located along Stane Street, extending over 2 to 3 acres occupied from the 1st century AD to the 4th century AD; a Roman cremation cemetery and possible shrine were discovered along with timber buildings. The settlement is considered to be a vicus."

Of Braintree, a similar report reads:

"The site of a Roman settlement at Braintree. Material found here suggests an extensive pre-Roman settlement, which continued as a small Roman urban centre at the intersection of Roman roads through the 1st century and perhaps diminishing in the 2nd, 3rd and 4th centuries."

=== Bypasses ===
The A120 bypasses several towns and villages. These include:

- Little Hadham (Opened December 2021) – According to Hertfordshire County Council, the project was first proposed in 2007 as a "solution to congestion in the area". In 2019, the government's Department for Transport agreed to provide £27.9 million funding for the scheme.
- Bishop's Stortford – Former A120 renumbered A1250.
- Takeley, Great Dunmow, Rayne and Braintree (Opened July 2004) – According to a Highways Agency study in July 2011, the 18.5 km dual carriageway between the M11 motorway and Braintree, past Stansted Airport, resulted in a journey saving time of 10–12 minutes. The report noted an "accident saving of 288 accidents per year", although it highlighted there were some issues with the number of biodiversity schemes that were implemented. The previous A120 route was renumbered B1256.
- Coggeshall
- East of Colchester – Previously A604.

== Economy ==
The A120 passes UK "international gateways" at London Stansted Airport and Harwich International Port. Connecting roads link the A120 with other UK gateways, such as the A12 towards Felixstowe and the M11 towards London. Since 2010, organisations including National Highways, A120 Driving Economic Growth and Transport East have identified the "A120 corridor" as one which supports UK government's economic ambitions such as growth and "levelling up".
