= Accommodation bridge =

Bridge built to preserve an old, private path

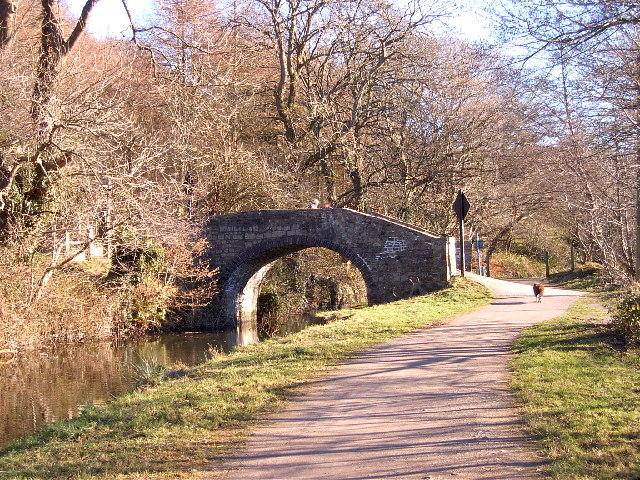
Typical small canal accommodation bridge

In the United Kingdom, an accommodation bridge or occupation bridge is one that preserves a pre-existing private road, path or right of access when a major transport route is built across it. Without the bridge, access would be disrupted. Accommodation bridges are usually built at the cost of the route developer, as part of the conditions for obtaining the land for building the new route.

The term is not applied where the new route crosses an existing public highway.

== Canals ==
The first accommodation bridges were built as part of 18th-century canal building. Most were provided for farmers, whose lands and grazing were separated by the canal. The first canals developed from rivers, with short lengths of canal built to bypass obstacles, such as weirs and millponds. The river represented a long-established and accepted boundary, but these new sections were resented by landlords.

Unlike turnpike roads, drovers could not simply cross a new canal but now needed a bridge. These bridges also needed to meet the standards of the canal builder, allowing the towpath through beneath and sufficient clearance for passing boats, and being constructed to be sufficiently robust, without risk of a collapse blocking the canal. To save costs, the Kennet Navigation, in flat country, used swing bridges rather than arches. Other canals such as the Oxford Canal, also used lifting bridges.

== Railways ==
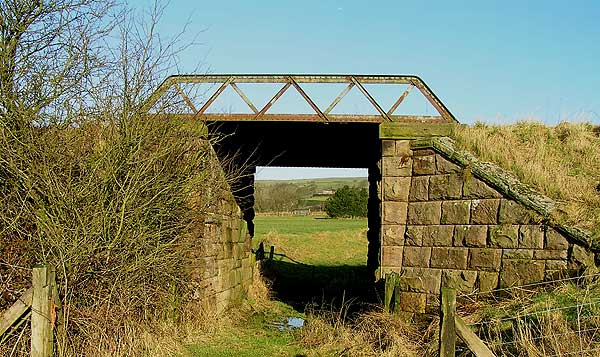
Simple railway underpass, with Warren truss girder

Most accommodation bridges, in the UK at least, were constructed during the railway building boom of the mid-19th century. British practice avoided level crossings wherever possible, except in the flat parts of the country where building a raised approach to a bridge would be more costly. Nevertheless, the term is still more usually applied to canal bridges.

As the load carried by the new railway was almost always greater than the old path, nearly all accommodation bridges are overbridges, carrying the old track over the new railway. Underpasses were relatively rare, except where more convenient in hilly country, as the old track may have followed the land more closely than a gradient-sensitive railway.

In Britain an accommodation bridge is the name for a bridge connecting tracts of land belonging to a single owner that were separated by the railway. An occupation bridge is the name for a bridge carrying an existing private road or taking the railway over an existing private road. Similar terms were applied to level crossings.

== Motorways ==
Until motorways were introduced in the 1960s accommodation bridges across new roads were rarely needed, as a simple crossroad would be provided instead. Motorways do not have crossroads, but grade-separated junctions with slip roads, requiring bridges for local roads crossing them.

== See also ==
- Cattle creep
