= A10 road (England) =

Road in England

A10

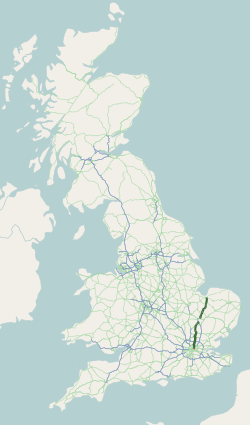

Route information
- Length: 90.2 mi (145.2 km)

Major junctions
- South end: A3 at London Bridge51.5079°N 0.0872°W
- A406 in Enfield M25 near Waltham Cross A414 near Hoddesdon A120 near Puckeridge A505 near Royston M11 near Cambridge; A14 in Milton A142 near Ely A134 near Watlington

- North end: A47 / A149 near King's Lynn52.754°N 0.398°E

Location
- Country: United Kingdom
- Constituent country: England
- Primary destinations: City of London; Dalston; Enfield; Hertford; Cambridge; Ely; Downham Market; King's Lynn

Road network
- Roads in the United Kingdom; Motorways; A and B road zones
← A9	→ A11

The A10 is a major road in England which runs between The City of London and King's Lynn in Norfolk.

At its southern terminus, the route meets the A3 directly north of London Bridge, above Monument London Underground station. At its northern end, the A10 meets the A47 and A149 roads south-west of King's Lynn town centre. The route passes through or around primary destinations in Greater London, Hertfordshire, Cambridgeshire and Norfolk, including Dalston, Enfield, Hertford, Cambridge, Ely and Downham Market.

The route between Bishopsgate in the City of London and Royston, Hertfordshire, roughly follows the path of Ermine Street, a Roman road.

== Route ==
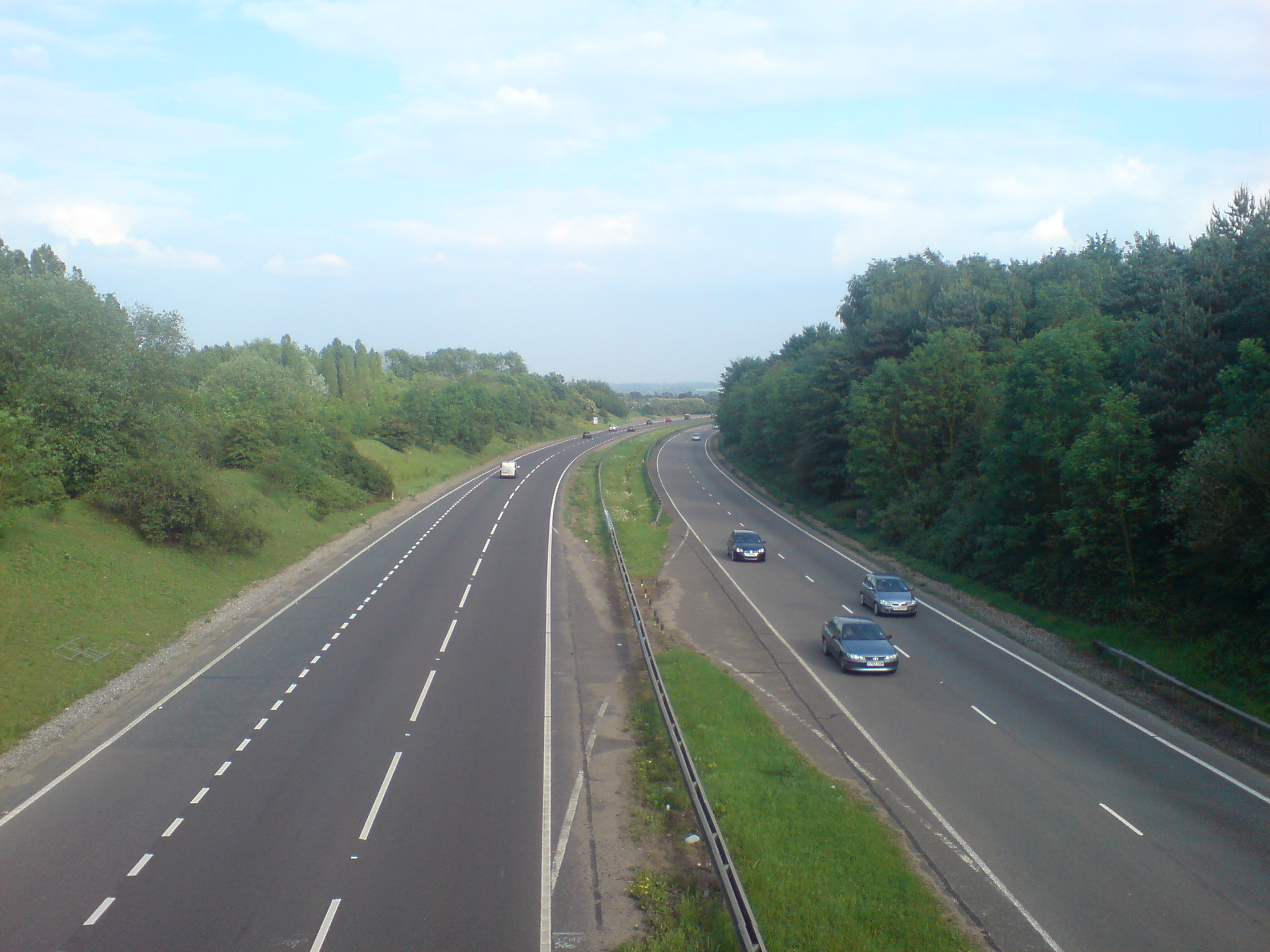
A10 outside Hertford facing south towards London

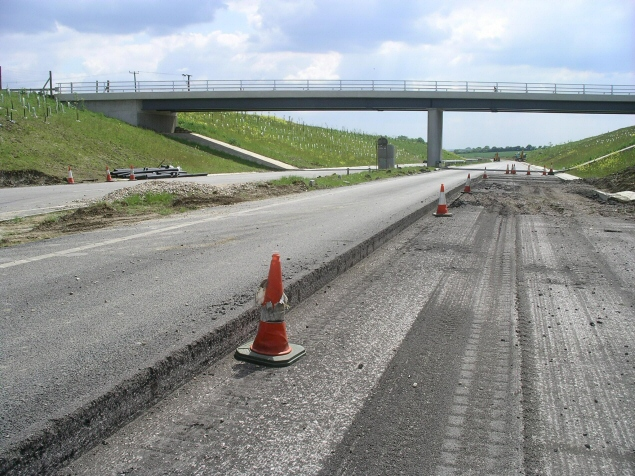
A10 Wadesmill bypass undergoing remedial work before opening

=== City of London ===
At its southern end, the A10 begins at a junction with the A3, on the northern bank of the River Thames. The A3 runs southbound over London Bridge towards Elephant and Castle, before continuing south-west to Guildford and Portsmouth. At the junction the A10 also meets Cannon Street (towards St Pauls Cathedral and Blackfriars), King William Street (towards Bank) and Eastcheap (towards Tower Hill). Monument tube station on the Circle and District lines is directly below the junction. The Monument to the Great Fire of London is south-east of the junction.

Running north from the junction, the A10 is carried by Gracechurch Street, Bishopsgate and Norton Folgate. Liverpool Street station - the London terminus of the West Anglia Main Line (down to Enfield, Hertford, Stansted Airport and Cambridge) and the Great Eastern Main Line (down to Southend, Chelmsford, Ipswich and Norwich) - sits directly west of the A10 Bishopsgate. 22 Bishopsgate is the second-tallest building in London, and the tallest within The Square Mile.

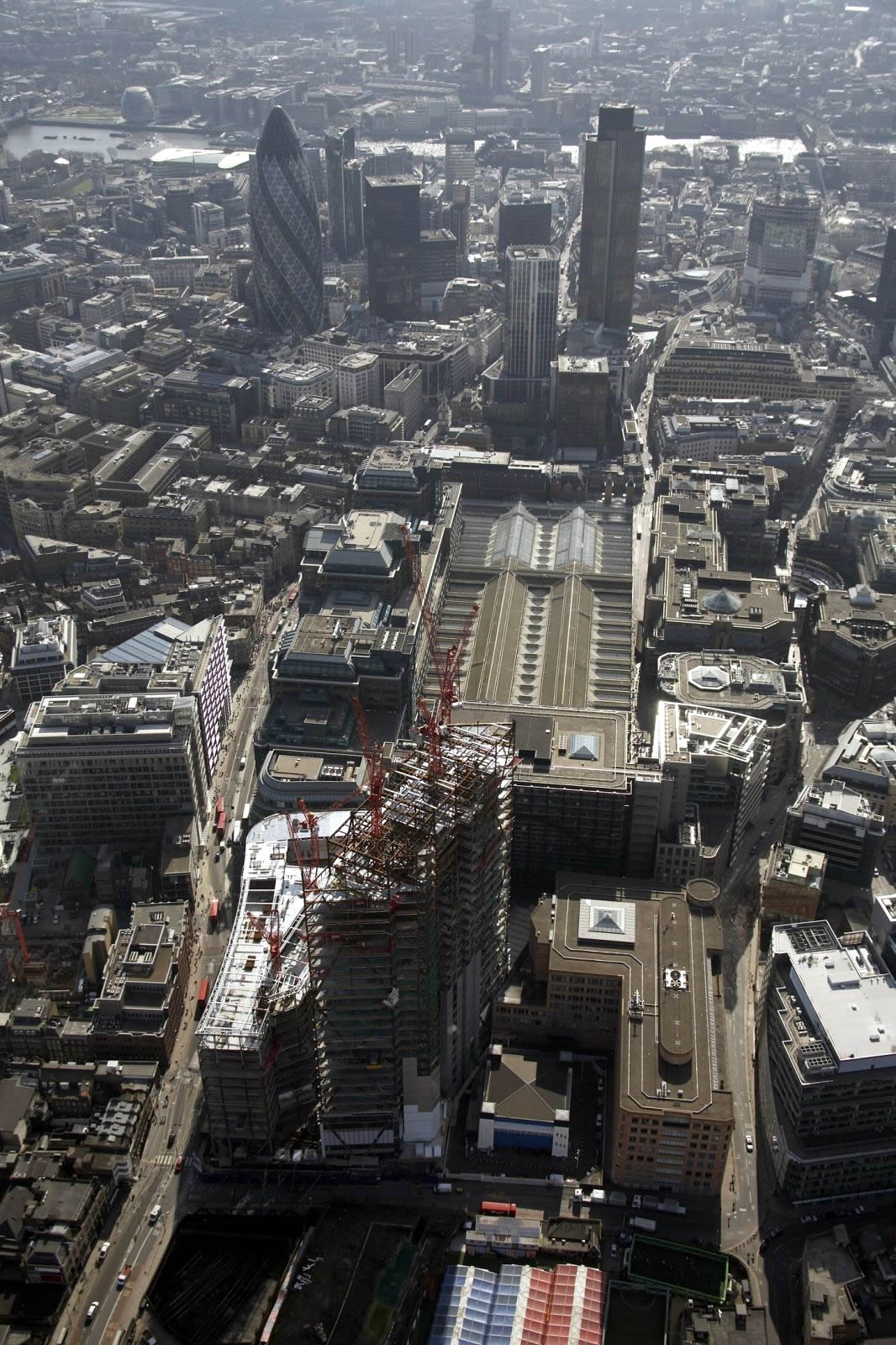
A10 in the City of London

=== Greater London ===
Leaving the City of London northbound, the A10 is carried by Shoreditch High Street. The route meets the A1202 Great Eastern Street/Commercial Street - the London Inner Ring Road - directly to the south-west of Shoreditch High Street London Overground station.

The London Inner Ring Road forms the boundary to the London Congestion Charge zone. The A10 falls within the charging zone between the A3 London Bridge and the ring road.

North from the ring road, the A10 is carried by Kingsland Road, Kingsland High Street and Stoke Newington Road, before meeting a gyratory in the Stoke Newington area (Stoke Newington High Street, Northwold Road, Rectory Road and Manse Road). The A10 continues along Stamford Hill, Tottenham High Road, Bruce Grove, Lordship Lane and The Roundway - a crescent around the original Tower Gardens Estate (Tottenham's Garden Suburb), shared with the A1080.

The A10 passes Haggerston, Dalston Junction, Dalston Kingsland, Rectory Road, Stoke Newington, South Tottenham and Seven Sisters London Overground stations, and Seven Sisters tube station.

Northbound from The Roundway, the A10 is carried by Great Cambridge Road, a dual carriageway.

Along Great Cambridge Road, the A10 meets the A406 North Circular Road. Between A3 London Bridge and the North Circular Road, the A10 falls within the Ultra Low Emission Zone. The A10 then passes through Southbury, cutting between Edmonton and Enfield before meeting the M25 London Orbital motorway at junction 25 (the Greater London and London Low Emission Zone boundaries).

In Greater London and the City of London, the A10 is managed by Transport for London.

=== Hertfordshire ===
In Hertfordshire, leaving the M25 motorway junction, the A10 meets the A121 and B198 roads at a roundabout. Waltham Cross sits directly east of the route.

Continuing north, the A10 dual carriageway runs unbroken until Standon, passing Cheshunt, Broxbourne, Hoddesdon, Hertford, Ware and Wadesmill - through the Lea Valley. The route meets with the primary routes A414 (for Hertford town centre, Harlow and Chelmsford), A602 (for Stevenage) and the A120 (for Bishop's Stortford and Stansted Airport).

The dual carriageway then passes around the western perimeter of Puckeridge before becoming a single carriageway primary route near Westmill. The A10 becomes the Buntingford bypass, then continues north through Chipping, Buckland, Reed and Royston, to meet the A505 (for Baldock and Newmarket) at Hertfordshire's border with Cambridgeshire. The A10 through Royston is a gyratory comprising Market Hill, Priory Lane and Barkway Street.

=== Cambridgeshire ===
The A10 has been split into two sections in Cambridgeshire.

The southern section runs between Royston and the M11 motorway at junction 11. The single-carriageway route passes between the villages of Meldreth and Melbourn, along the south-eastern edge of Shepreth and through Foxton, Harston and Hauxton. At the M11 junction 11, the A10 meets the A1309 which continues into Cambridge City Centre, past the Trumpington Park and Ride.

The northern section runs between the A14 at junction 33 (Milton Interchange) and the River Little Ouse. Access from the Milton Interchange into Cambridge is via the A1309 southbound, near Cambridge Science Park - which is directly south-west of the junction - and Cambridge North railway station.

Northbound from the A14, the A10 runs along the western edge of Milton, passing Milton Park and Ride. The route also passes Landbeach, Waterbeach, Stretham and Little Thetford, crossing the River Great Ouse between Waterbeach and Stretham.

South of Ely, the A10 meets the A142 (for Chatteris, Soham and Newmarket). The route forms the western bypass to the City of Ely and Littleport before crossing the River Great Ouse for a second time. The A10 runs along the eastern bank of the Ouse until Southery in Norfolk, entering the county near Black Horse Drove.

=== Norfolk ===
In Norfolk, the A10 passes Southery, Hilgay, Fordham, Denver, Downham Market, Tottenhill and West Winch before reaching the A47 (for Peterborough, Wisbech, Swaffham and Norwich). In Norfolk, the A10 meets the primary routes A1122 (for Wisbech and Swaffham) and A134 (for Thetford). The route also meets the A149 for Cromer and Hunstanton (known locally as The Coast Road), and King's Lynn town centre.

== Major junctions ==
County	Location	mi	km	Destinations	Notes
Greater London	City of London	0.0	0.0	Prince William Street (A3 south) / Eastcheap / Cannon Street	Southern terminus; northern terminus of A3
Greater London	City of London	0.4	0.64	Wormwood Street (A1211)	
Greater London	Hackney	0.9	1.4	Ring Road south to A11 / A13 / A2 – Docklands, Whitechapel	Southbound only
Greater London	Hackney	1.0	1.6	A1209 east (Bethnal Green Road) – Bethnal Green	Western terminus of A1209
Greater London	Hackney	1.2	1.9	Hackney Road (A1208 east) / Old Street	Western terminus of A1208
Greater London	Hackney	2.5	4.0	A104 (Dalston Lane / Balls Pond Road) – Dalston, Hackney, Holloway, Highbury	No access to A104 south-west from A10 south
Greater London	Hackney	4.4	7.1	A107 (Upper Clapton Road / Amhurst Park) – Clapton	No access from A10 north to A107 north or from A10 south to A107 south; information signed southbound only
Greater London	Haringey	5.1	8.2	A503 south-west (Seven Sisters Road) – Manor House, West End, Holloway, Finsbury Park	Manor House signed northbound only; West End, Holloway, and Finsbury Park signed southbound only; southern terminus of A503 concurrency
Greater London	Haringey	5.2	8.4	A504 (West Green Road / Broad Lane) – Hornsey, West Green	Southbound only
Greater London	Haringey	5.5	8.9	A503 north-east (Monument Way) / Philip Lane (B153) to M11 / A1055 / A504 – Walthamstow, Tottenham Hale, Edmonton, Hornsey, West Green	To A1055 and Edmonton signed northbound only; northern terminus of A503 concurrency
Greater London	Haringey	5.9	9.5	A1010 north (High Road) – Edmonton	Southern terminus of A1010
Greater London	Haringey	6.3	10.1	A109 south-east (Lordship Lane) to A1010 – Edmonton	Information signed southbound only; southern terminus of A109 concurrency
Greater London	Haringey	6.4	10.3	A109 north-west (Lordship Lane) – Wood Green	Northern terminus of A109 concurrency
Greater London	Haringey	6.9	11.1	A1080 south-west (The Roundway) to A1090 – Hornsey, Wood Green	Information signed northbound only; north-eastern terminus of A1080
Greater London	Enfield	7.9	12.7	A406 (North Circular Road) / A111 north-west (Hedge Lane) to M1 / M11 / A1 / A41 / A12 / A13 – Edmonton, Brent Cross, Potters Bar, Palmers Green	Potters Bar signed northbound only; south-eastern terminus of A111
Greater London	Enfield	10.6	17.1	A110 (Southbury Road) – Chingford, Ponders End, Enfield, Oakwood	
Greater London	Enfield	11.3	18.2	Carterhatch Lane (A105 south) – Enfield Highway, Forty Hill	Northern terminus of A105
Greater London– Hertfordshire boundary	Enfield–Waltham Cross boundary	13.0	20.9	M25 / M1 / M4 / M11 / M20 / M40 – Watford, Stansted Airport	M25 junction 25
Hertfordshire	Waltham Cross boundary	13.6	21.9	A121 south (Winston Churchill Way) / B198 (Lieutenant Ellis Way) – Cheshunt, Waltham Cross, Cuffley, Goffs Oak	Northern terminus of A121
Hertfordshire	No major junctions				
Hertfordshire	Cheshunt	15.5	24.9	Brookfield Centre, New River Trading	Northbound exit only
Hertfordshire	Cheshunt–Broxbourne town boundary	16.0– 16.4	25.7– 26.4	To A1170 – Broxbourne, Hertford, Hoddesdon, Wormley, Turnford	Hertford and Hoddesdon signed northbound only, Wormley and Turnford southbound only; no southbound entrance
Hertfordshire	Hoddesdon town boundary	18.8– 19.3	30.3– 31.1	To A1170 / A414 – Hoddesdon, Hertford, Harlow	To A414, Hertford, and Harlow signed northbound only
Hertfordshire		20.1– 20.7	32.3– 33.3	A414 east to A1170 – Chelmsford, Harlow, Ware	Southern terminus of A414 concurrency
Hertfordshire	Rush Green	21.6– 22.1	34.8– 35.6	A414 west – Hertford	Northern terminus of A414 concurrency
Hertfordshire		22.2– 22.6	35.7– 36.4	Kingsmead Viaduct	
Hertfordshire	Ware	23.1– 23.6	37.2– 38.0	A602 / B1001 – Stevenage, Ware	South-eastern terminus of A602
Hertfordshire		24.1– 24.3	38.8– 39.1	A1170 – Ware, Wadesmill, Thundridge	
Hertfordshire		28.6	46.0	End freeway	
Hertfordshire		28.6	46.0	A120 east / Ermine Street – Bishop's Stortford, Stansted Airport, The Hadhams, Puckeridge, Standon, Old Hall Green	Western terminus of A120
Hertfordshire	Buntingford	33.6	54.1	A507 west (Baldock Road) / Baldock Road (B1038) – Baldock, Buntingford	Eastern terminus of A507
Hertfordshire— Cambridgeshire county boundary	Royston town boundary	41.7	67.1	A505 to M11 / A1198 – Newmarket, Huntingdon, Baldock	
Cambridgeshire	Cambridge city boundary	50.5	81.3	M11 / A1309 north (Hauxton Road) – London, The North, Huntingdon, Ely, Cambridge	Northern terminus of southern segment
Cambridgeshire		50.5	81.3	Gap in route around Cambridge	
Cambridgeshire	Milton	50.5	81.3	A14 / A1309 south (Milton Road) / Cambridge Road to M11 / A428 – Newmarket, Midlands, Huntingdon, London, Bedford, Cambridge, Milton	Southern terminus of northern segment; northern terminus of A1309
Cambridgeshire	Stretham	59.1	95.1	A1123 (Wilburton Road) to A142 – Newmarket, Stretham, Huntingdon, Wilburton	
Cambridgeshire	Ely	62.4	100.4	A142 south-east (Angel Drove) / Cambridge Road – Newmarket, Ely	Southern terminus of A142 concurrency
Cambridgeshire	Ely	62.8	101.1	A142 / Witchford Road to A141 – March, Ely	Northern terminus of A142 concurrency
Cambridgeshire	Littleport	68.4	110.1	A1101 north-west / Wisbech Road – Wisbech, Littleport	Southern terminus of A1101 concurrency
Cambridgeshire	Littleport	70.2	113.0	A1101 south-east (Mildenhall Road) / New River Bank – Mildenhall, Queen Adelaide	Queen Adelaide signed southbound only; northern terminus of A1101 concurrency
Norfolk	Downham Market town boundary	80.1	128.9	A1122 west – Wisbech	Southern terminus of A1122 concurrency
Norfolk	Downham Market town boundary	81.0	130.4	A1122 east / Bexwell Road to A134 – Swaffham, Thetford, Downham Market	Northern terminus of A1122 concurrency
Norfolk		86.6	139.4	A134 south / Watlington Road – Thetford, Magdalen, Watlington	Northern terminus of A134
Norfolk	North Runcton	90.2	145.2	A47 / A149 (Hardwick Road / Queen Elizabeth Way) to A17 / A148 – Norwich, Swaffham, Wisbech, Sleaford, Cromer, Hunstanton, Sandringham, King's Lynn town centre	Northern terminus
1.000 mi = 1.609 km; 1.000 km = 0.621 mi

== History ==
=== Ermine Street ===
Between The City of London and Royston, the A10 follows a similar course to the Ermine Street Roman road.

Ermine Street was one of the radial routes from Londinium, with its southern terminus at Bishopsgate - one of the gates in the ruined London Wall. The gate stood where the A10 intersects with the A1211 Wormwood Street/Camomile Street. It was demolished in 1760.

At Royston, where the A10 bears north-east towards Cambridge, Ermine Street crosses the Icknield Way (between Wiltshire and Norfolk).

North of Royston, Ermine Street runs north towards Durovigutum (Godmanchester), Lindum Colonia (Lincoln) and Eboracum (York).

Bishopsgate lends its name to the street carrying the A10 between Leadenhall Street and Spital Square.

The A10 carries the name Ermine Street between Buntingford and Buckland in Hertfordshire. Ermine Street also lends its name to a ward in the North Hertfordshire council area, which is crossed by the A10 London Road (south of Royston).

=== Road numbering ===
The A10 first featured in the Ministry of Transport List of Class I and Class II Roads and Numbers 1922-1923. The A10 was designated the route London (Kingsland Road - Stamford Hill) - Tottenham - Ware - Royston - Cambridge - Ely - King's Lynn.

The A10 is one of two routes designated to run between London and Cambridge - the other being the M11 "London to Cambridge" motorway. The southern terminus of the M11 links with the A406 North Circular Road and A12 in the Woodford area of the London Borough of Redbridge. The two routes meet at the M11 junction 11, west of Trumpington. The motorway opened between 1975 and 1980.

The 1922 A10 route has been bypassed several times, with new road numbers on the original route. These include:

- A1010 through Edmonton and Waltham Cross;
- A1170 through Wormley, Broxbourne, Hoddesdon, Great Amwell and Ware;
- A1309 through Trumpington, Cambridge and Chesterton.
