= Richard Parsons (priest) =

English divine and antiquary

- Born: 1643; Birchanger
- Died: 12 June 1711
- Occupations: Divine and antiquarian

Richard Parsons (1643 – 12 June 1711) was an English divine and antiquarian.

== Biography ==
Parsons was the son of William Parsons (1599–1671), royalist divine, who was, as of founder's kin, scholar of Winchester and fellow of New College, Oxford, from 1604 (B.C.L. 1629, and D.C.L. 1660); rector of Birchanger in Essex from 1641; prebendary of Chichester, rector of Lambourne, Essex, and vicar of Dunmow, Essex, from 1660.

The son, born at Birchanger in 1643, was admitted to a scholarship at Winchester College, as of kin to the founder, in 1654, succeeded to a fellowship at New College, Oxford, in 1659, and matriculated on 25 October in the same year. He vacated his fellowship in 1665. He graduated B.C.L. on 8 April 1665, and D.C.L. on 25 June 1687. He became vicar of Driffield in Gloucestershire in 1674, and chancellor of the diocese of Gloucester in 1677. In 1695 a bill was filed against him in the court of exchequer, charging him with having unduly levied, and afterwards retained, sums of money from the dissenters during 1678, 1681, 1683, and 1685. He died on 12 June 1711, and was buried in Gloucester Cathedral. His wife Mary, two sons, Robert and Thomas, and three daughters — Anne, Mary, and Honour—were also buried in the cathedral.

At the instigation of Henry Wharton, Parsons made considerable collections towards a history of the cathedral and diocese of Gloucester. His manuscripts, after his death, passed into the possession of Jonathan Colley, chaplain and chanter of Christ Church, Oxford, thence into the library of Peter Le Neve, and in 1729, on the death of Le Neve, into that of Thomas Martin, of Palgrave in Suffolk. They were sold in 1730 to Rawlinson, and, with the rest of his manuscripts, came into the possession of the Bodleian Library in 1755 (Rawl. B. 323). They were made some use of by Sir Robert Atkyns (1647–1711) in his 'Ancient and Present State of Gloucestershire,' London, 1712. A manuscript by Parsons concerning impropriations in Gloucestershire, dated 8 July 1704, is in the British Museum (Lansdowne, 989, ff. 38–9).
