= Ipswich Road =

Ipswich Road may refer to:

- Ipswich Road, Brisbane, Australia
- Ipswich Road, Colchester, England
