= A1309 road =

Road in Cambridgeshire, England

Coordinates: 52°13′26″N 0°08′21″E

A1309

Major junctions
- From: Milton Interchange
- To: M11 motorway

Location
- Country: United Kingdom
- Constituent country: England

Road network
- Roads in the United Kingdom; Motorways; A and B road zones

The A1309 is a short road (6.5 miles) which links the two ends of the A10 to north and south of Cambridge city centre in Cambridgeshire, England. It was numbered as part of the A10 prior to the construction of the Cambridge Western Bypass (now M11) and the Northern Bypass (originally A45, now A14).

Its northern end is at the Milton Interchange with the A14 and A10. From here, it passes the Cambridge Science Park, the Cambridge Business Park, and the Cowley Road Park & Ride site, as Milton Road on its way to the Mitchams Corner gyratory complex just to the north of the city centre.

It is unmarked through the city centre, but reappears to the south on the route of the A1134 ring road named Trumpington Road which then becomes Trumpington High Street. In Trumpington, it has a junction with the A1301 and then passes the Trumpington Park & Ride site before its southern end at junction 11 of the M11 motorway and the A10.

== Changes ==
In November 2022, work began to overhaul the Milton Road section of the route.
