= Birchanger =

Village in Essex, England

Coordinates: 51.8829°N 0.1979°E

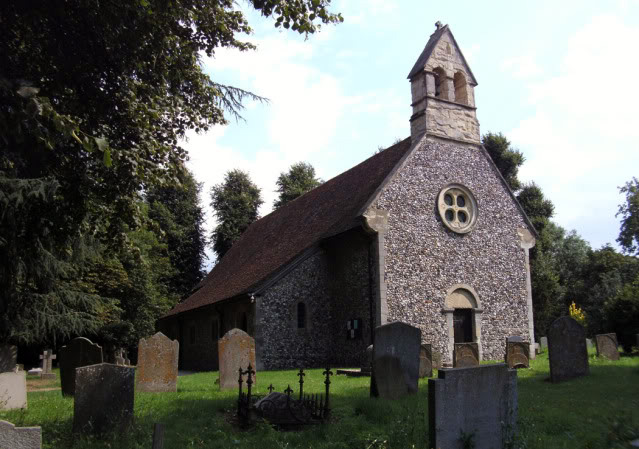
- St Mary the Virgin Church, Birchanger

- Location within Essex
- Population: 864 (Parish, 2021)
- OS grid reference: TL513227
- Civil parish: Birchanger
- District: Uttlesford
- Shire county: Essex
- Region: East
- Country: England
- Sovereign state: United Kingdom
- Post town: BISHOP'S STORTFORD
- Postcode district: CM23
- Dialling code: 01279
- Police: Essex
- Fire: Essex
- Ambulance: East of England
- UK Parliament: Saffron Walden

Birchanger (/ˈbərtʃæŋər/) is a village in Essex, England, 3 km (1.9 mi) north-east of Bishop's Stortford, its post town (which is over the county boundary in Hertfordshire), and 25 km (16 mi) north-west of the county town, Chelmsford. The village is in the district of Uttlesford and the parliamentary constituency of Saffron Walden. There is a Parish Council. At the 2021 census the parish had a population of 864.

The local CoE church of St Mary the Virgin, dating from the 12th century, is a Grade II* listed building.

The village lies close to London Stansted Airport, 3 km (1.9 mi) to the east, and is 2 km (1.2 mi) south of Stansted Mountfitchet. The parish includes Birchanger Green services on the M11 motorway.

In the 12th century, the village name in Old English was "Bircehangra", which means "wooded slope growing with birch trees". This name is still appropriate today as parts of Birchanger Wood still exist and contain many birch trees.

== See also ==
- Birchanger Green services
- The Hundred Parishes
