= Cattle creep =

Field-to-field access for farm animals

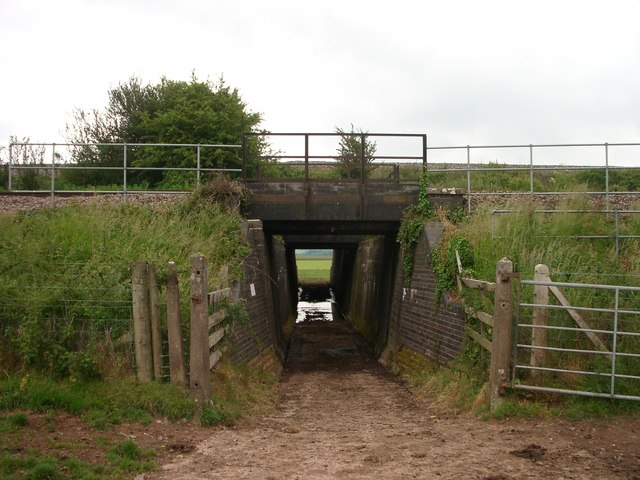
A cattle creep

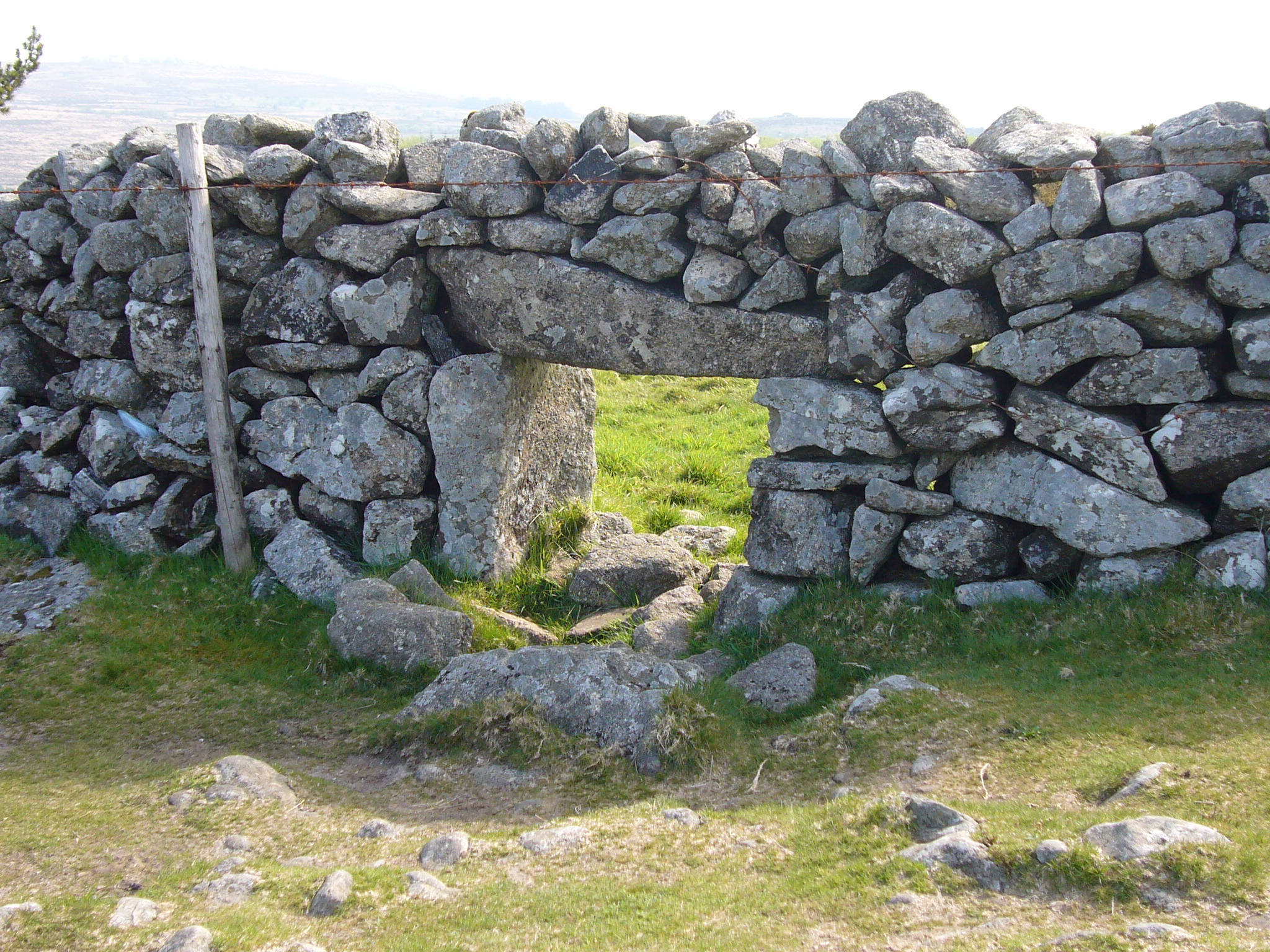
A sheep creep

A cattle creep is a small, field-to-field access for farm animals, usually to allow passage beneath an obstacle such as a road, canal, or railway embankment. Those under roads or railways may be termed underpasses.

As they are intended primarily for cattle or other livestock, cattle creeps usually have a low head height and are uncomfortable for humans to use.

On Dartmoor, in south-west England, the term sheep creep is used to describe a purposely constructed gap in the base of a drystone wall, commonly topped with a granite lintel. The gap allows sheep to pass from field to field, but is deliberately too small for cattle or ponies. Similarly in Cornwall small gaps are constructed in Cornish hedges to allow sheep to pass through to graze the cliff-tops. The gap can be closed by covering it with a slab of slate.

== See also ==
- Wildlife crossing
- Accommodation bridge
