= Birchanger Green services =

Motorway service area in Essex, England

Birchanger Services
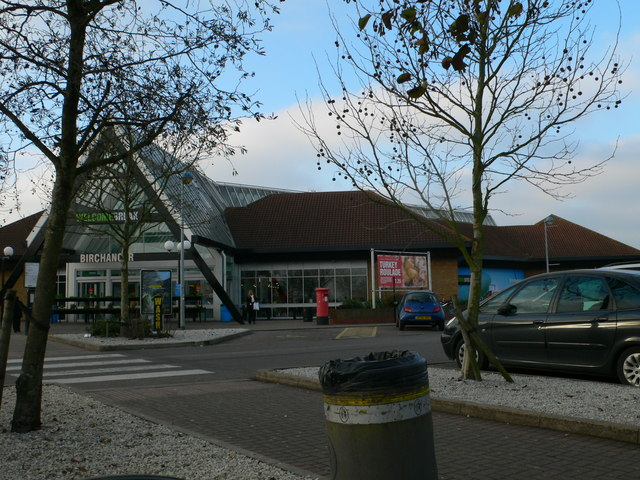
- The main building

- Location within Essex

Information
- County: Essex
- Road: M11
- Coordinates: 51°52′16″N 0°11′45″E
- Operator: Welcome Break
- Date opened: 9 March 1995
- Website: welcomebreak.co.uk/locations/birchanger-green/

Birchanger Green services is a motorway service station on the M11 motorway at Birchanger near Stansted in Essex, England. It is owned by Welcome Break.

== History ==
It was sited on 28 acres (11 ha) at Start Hill. It was to be called 'Stansted Green'. The local parish council wanted the site just to be called 'Birchanger'.

The site should have opened in March 1993, as for 16 years there had been no services on the motorway. Forte stopped planning work in 1992, and resumed in November 1993.

There would be 200 staff and room for 320 cars, and 75 trucks, with seating for 270.

After 12 months of building, it opened at 7 am 9 March 1995. Audrey Brown was the first customer, travelling from Peterborough to London. The official opening was on Friday 28 April 1995 by the local MP Alan Haselhurst. The Travelodge opened on 23 October 1995, costing £34.50 per night. In 2026 the cost is double that with prices ranging from £55 to £90 depending on when the room is booked.

== Construction ==
The architect was Roy Millard Associates of Bishop's Stortford. The consulting engineer Marks, Heeley and Brothwell of Bishop Stortford.

== Customers ==
Birchanger Green services scored a 95% satisfaction rating according to a Motorway Services User Survey conducted by Transport Focus in 2019.
