= M11 motorway =

Motorway in England

M11

- M11 highlighted in blue Shown with UK motorway network

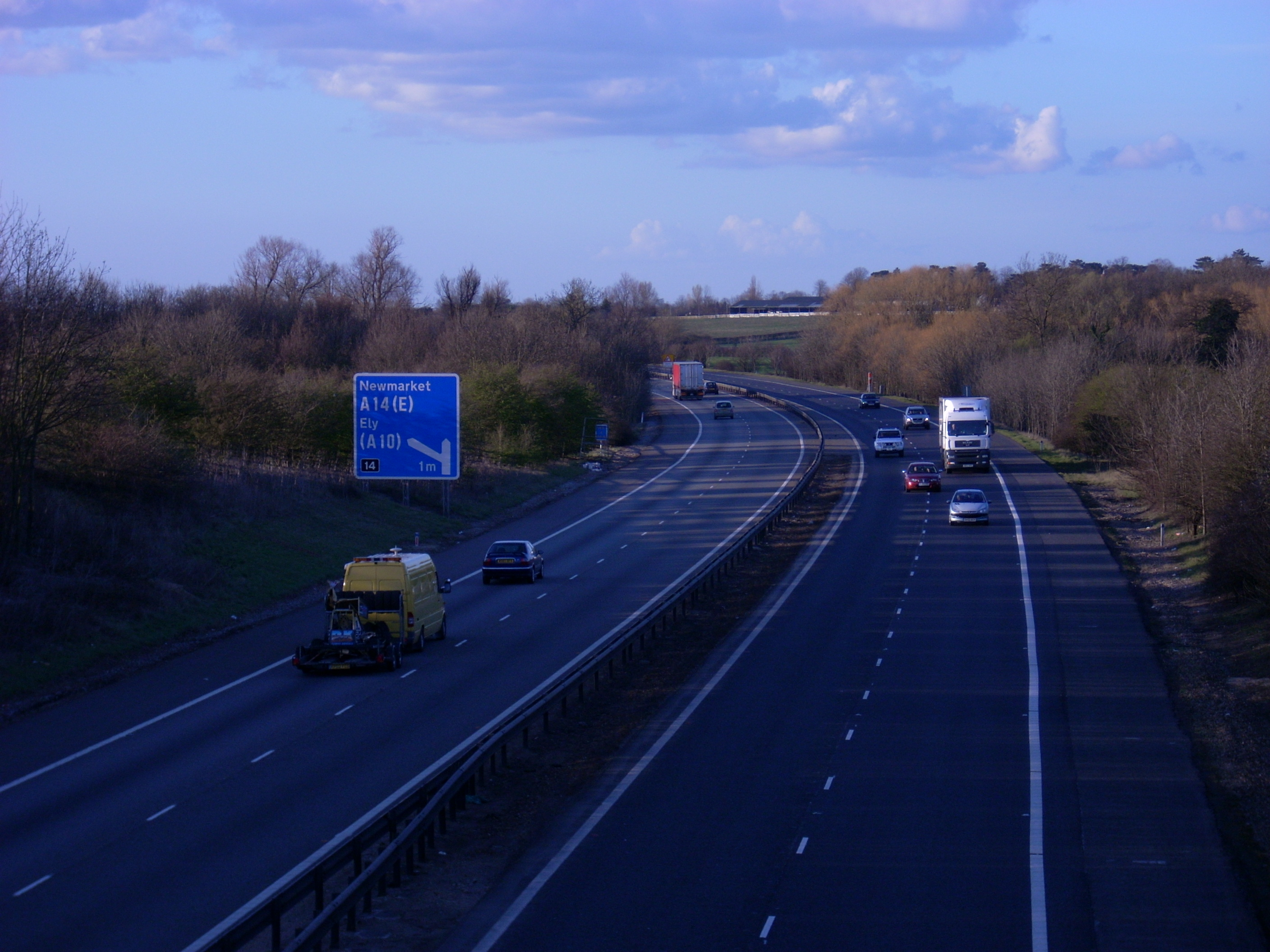
- The M11 north of Cambridge, 2008

Route information
- Maintained by National Highways
- Length: 55.0 mi (88.5 km)
- Existed: 1975–present
- History: Opened: 1975; Completed: 1980

Major junctions
- Southwest end: South Woodford
- M25 motorway
- Northeast end: Girton

Location
- Country: United Kingdom
- Counties: Greater London, Essex, Cambridgeshire
- Primary destinations: London; Harlow; Stansted Airport; Cambridge

Road network
- Roads in the United Kingdom; Motorways; A and B road zones
← M9	→ M18

The M11 is a 55-mile-long (89 km) motorway that runs north from the North Circular Road (A406) at South Woodford to the A14 at Girton, northwest of Cambridge, England. It was originally proposed as a trunk road as early as 1915; various plans were considered throughout the 1960s, with final construction being undertaken between 1975 and 1980. The motorway was opened in stages, with the first stage between junctions 7 and 8 opening in June 1975, and the completed motorway becoming fully operational in February 1980. The motorway provides direct access to Harlow and Cambridge, and since 2002 has greatly improved access to London Stansted Airport.

== Route ==
The M11 starts in South Woodford in northeast London, just north of Redbridge Roundabout, and crosses the North Circular (A406) at junction 4. It then heads NNE, passing east of Loughton and Theydon Bois as well as Epping Forest, meeting the M25 motorway at junction 6, and then veering approximately north, passing to the east of Harlow. The M11 gives access to Bishop's Stortford and the motorway's only service station via junction 8. This is followed immediately by the recently constructed junction 8A, which provides a free-flow link to the improved A120 that links to Stansted Airport. The M11 then traverses part of Cambridgeshire, meeting a spur for the A11 at junction 9, Stump Cross, and then finally ends at junction 14, the Girton Interchange, with the road continuing through the junction and becoming the A14, which continues the route on to Huntingdon and the north.

The motorway starts with two lanes southbound and three northbound; then, north of Woodford Bridge, both directions have three lanes, a layout that continues up to junction 8A, except for a brief two-lane section at junction 6, beneath the M25. From junction 8 the motorway has two lanes in both directions all the way to junction 14 where the motorway terminates. The motorway is illuminated at the southern terminus near junction 4, at junction 6 (the M25 interchange), and also at the approach to junction 8/8A (Stansted Airport/Bishop's Stortford), and then at the northern terminus at junction 14, for the A14. All four of these sections use modern high-pressure sodium (SON) lighting. The older, yellow, low-pressure sodium (SOX) lighting originally used at junctions 4 and 6 was replaced in 2005. The M11 junctions 1, 2 and 3 do not exist (see the History section below for an explanation).

== History ==
=== Planning ===
Plans for an 'Eastern Avenue' in London had been proposed as early as 1915, and the Eastern Avenue Extension was causing local concern in Leyton and Hackney during the late 1950s and early 1960s. It was opposed by a number of groups, including the Hackney Society and local residents as represented by their member of parliament in 1962.

By 1966, the Ministry of Transport was planning a longer road and for it to be partly motorway. The first version had a mid-south section, to follow a River Lea route, starting at Angel southwest of Dalston, heading northeast then north, taking land by the river in Walthamstow, Chingford and Waltham Cross, and meeting the built road alignment of today north of Harlow. The road from South Woodford to Islington would have been designated as the M12. The route was in planning stages with several options, with differences between the plans preferred by the Greater London Council and the Ministry of Transport – a different version called for this 'Eastern Avenue' to run more east–west alongside the Regent's Canal and the north side of Victoria Park, Hackney Wick, where it would have connected to the North Cross and East Cross Routes at the northeast corner of an inner ringway identified by the London Ringways (Note: An expressway inner circular, referred to as the London Motorway Box) plan.

There were three proposed routes from the inner to outer ringway (North Circular) at the base of the current M11, and it is unclear which one was favoured.

Under one scheme, south of South Woodford a connection would have been made with the western end of a proposed "M12" towards Colchester. These proposals also made the case for an M15 motorway for the Ringway 2, a major upgrade of the North Circular Road to typical motorway standard. When the southern end of the current M11 ended here, space was provided between the two carriageways to enable an offshoot of 'the M12' to merge from the southwest: junctions 1, 2 and 3 were reserved for this additional inner London section. Part of the unbuilt route of a southern section of the M11 is seen from a sliproad from the North Circular to the M11 which travels over a bridge over bare land.

It was announced in March 1975 that from junction 8 (Bishops Stortford/Stansted exit) to the northern terminus, (thus including the Cambridge western bypass) would not be "constructed to M1 standard". This was another way of stating that, following a change in government policy, this section would comprise two rather than three lanes in each direction.

=== Cambridge Western Bypass ===
The Cambridge Western Bypass was separately planned by May 1968, but not as a motorway, and would connect to the M11 at Stump Cross.

On September 18 1970, the 14-mile Cambridge Western Bypass was added to the motorway, and the route had been surveyed in late 1969, and was planned to open in 1974.

By early December 1970 the western bypass would now meet the A604, to give routes to the north. But on February 26 1971 a new route around Cambridge was published, further away from villages.

The Cambridge Roads Campaign was formed in late 1970, to oppose the bypass. A public inquiry was planned for May 11 1971, but took place on February 15 1972, and lasted over six months. In late October 1971 the route of the Cambridge bypass was altered again. Sir Colin Buchanan (town planner) said that a six-lane motorway bypass was too big for a town like Cambridge, and his proposal was to abandon the bypass, and improve local main roads.

In October 1974 the new Labour government announced that, to save money, the Cambridge bypass would be built to lower standards. There was another public inquiry on March 16 1976, which was attended by Douglas Bader.

=== Additions ===
The M11 Link Road, or more formally 'A12 Hackney to M11 link road' (in fact leading to the North Circular) was constructed during the 1990s from Hackney Wick by Victoria Park to the Redbridge Roundabout—the interchange with the North Circular—and was opened in 1999 (Note: as the A12 which then continues to the east to Chelmsford and Colchester). The route of this road, which followed a similar route to one of the initial proposals resulted in the protracted M11 link road protest between 1993 and 1995, one of a spate of major UK road protests under the Major ministry.

A new junction 7a was opened on 10 June 2022. The stated aims for this development are:

- Create a new east–west link, which will move traffic smoothly out of Harlow on to the M11
- Reduce congestion on the north–south links through Harlow and towards junction 7
- Create new public transport and sustainable travel opportunities
- Provide new opportunities for housing and business developments.

=== Abortive/suspended proposals ===
==== Junction 5 ====
An official plan to add north-facing connections at junction 5 in Debden, Loughton was abandoned in 1998.

==== Junctions 6 to 8 ====
M11 Junction 6 to 8 widening
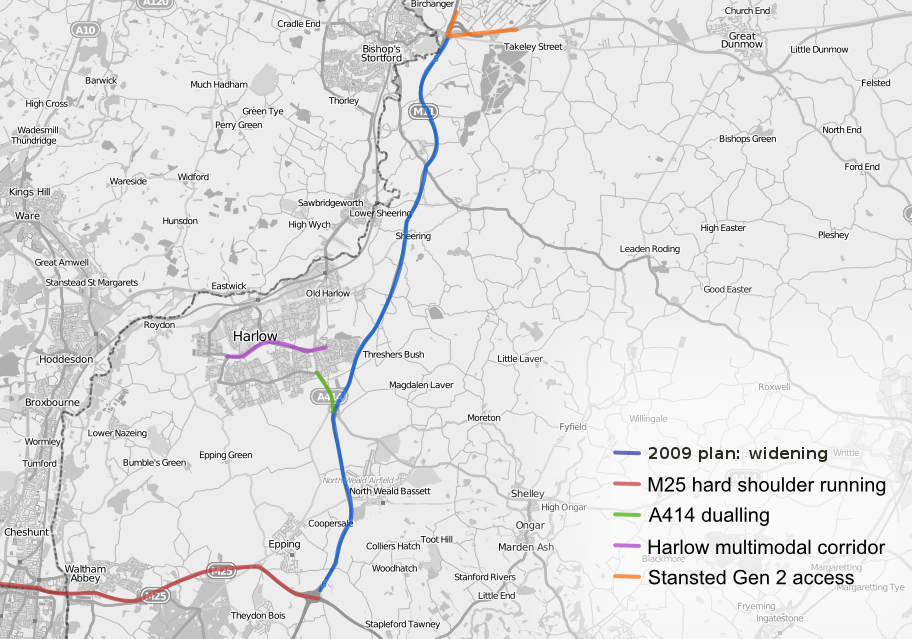
- A map showing the 2009 proposal for widening of the M11 and surrounding road proposals
- Location: Essex
- Proposer: Highways Agency
- Status: suspended
- Type: road
- Cost estimate: £698 million (2007)
- Geometry: KML

The Highways Agency tabled proposals to upgrade the M11, between junction 6 and 8, from three lanes plus hard shoulder to four each way with an estimated cost of £698 million given in 2007. A number of public consultations were made throughout 2007 and although efforts were made to limit environmental damage the scheme would cause disruption and loss of habitat to three designated ecological areas and a Site of Special Scientific Interest (SSSI) at Gernon Bushes. Maps of the proposal and previously discounted options were published by the Highways Agency. Plans were abandoned in March 2009 when the Secretary of State for Transport announced that no changes would be made to this section of motorway before 2021.

== Construction ==
The motorway was opened in stages.

The stretch between junctions 7 and 8 opened in 1975. In October 1972 a £7,104,737 contract for Birchanger to Hastingwood was given to Tarmac. It was opened on Monday June 23 1975.

Junctions 4 and 7 opened in 1977. (Note: Constructed to the south of the not-yet built M25 interchange by W. & C. French Engineering, and to its north by Dowsett Engineering Construction Ltd of Harrogate) South Woodford to Hastingwood was opened on April 14 1977. Construction started in January 1975, with the £8,834,238 Contract 2 to Dowsett for Loughton to Hastingwood, being 7.75 miles. Contract 1, in October 1973 for £11,839,000 was to W. & C. French for South Woodford to Loughton.

The stretch from junctions 8 to 9 opened in 1979. Hastingwood to Stump Cross opened on Wednesday 28 November 1979, being only two lanes wide. The concrete was laid on a 11.2-metre wide ABG paver train, made in Hamelin in Germany by Allgemeine Baumaschinen-Gesellschaft, now owned by Ammann Group. The contract North of Quendon to Stump Cross was given to Holland Hannen Cubitts, being 8.5 miles. Contract 4B was to Tarmac. The Contract 4A from the A120 to the North of Quendon was given to Sir Alfred McAlpine, being 6.3 miles. Loughton to Stump Cross had a concrete surface

That between junctions 9 and 14 opened in 1980; and the full length became fully operational in February 1980. The Cambridge western bypass contract eas awarded in July 1977, and started in early August 1977, and another £7,364,675 contract to Amey in August 1977. The £22m bypass opened on February 22 1980.

Budgets were tight during the 1970s when the road was built, so the road surface was of unsurfaced concrete between junction 14 and a point approximately 2 miles (3.2 km) to the south of junction 7. South of this stretch, where the road runs on soft ground close to the River Roding, concrete was considered unsuitable owing to the looseness of the subsoil and the consequent risk of random cracking, so the surface here was of tarmac from the start.

== Services ==
The motorway's first, and only, service station, Birchanger Green Services at junction 8, opened in 1996. The services also serve the A120, a major high-speed dual-carriageway road, running from junction 8A to the eastern fringe of Braintree, it continues on to Colchester as a busy single-carriageway road.

There had been plans for a service station on the motorway as long ago as 1969, named Chigwell, between that village and Loughton, which led to the construction of spur roads and a restricted lorry park; during the London Olympics 2012 these were used as a works unit. The plans for a service station at this site were officially dropped in 1980.

A service station was planned in the early 1970s at Whiteditch Farm, between Wendens Ambo and Newport, Essex.

== Operation ==
From the late 1990s onward, the concrete surface that had greatly degraded was progressively replaced with standard layers of tarmac, and drainage improvements were implemented at the same time. This work was completed in June 2008.

Junction 8A for the A120 road and Stansted Airport opened in December 2002.

== Proposed developments ==
By way of complementary plans for proposed expansion of Stansted Airport, the Highways Agency collaborated with BAA on improvements to transport access to the airport including two proposals for the M11, one of which has been deemed unnecessary, junctions 6–8, see above and the other of which, including spur road and junction additions may be approved by the government if Stansted expansion takes place.

=== M11 and A120 interchange – Stansted generation 2 airport access ===
Stansted generation 2 airport access
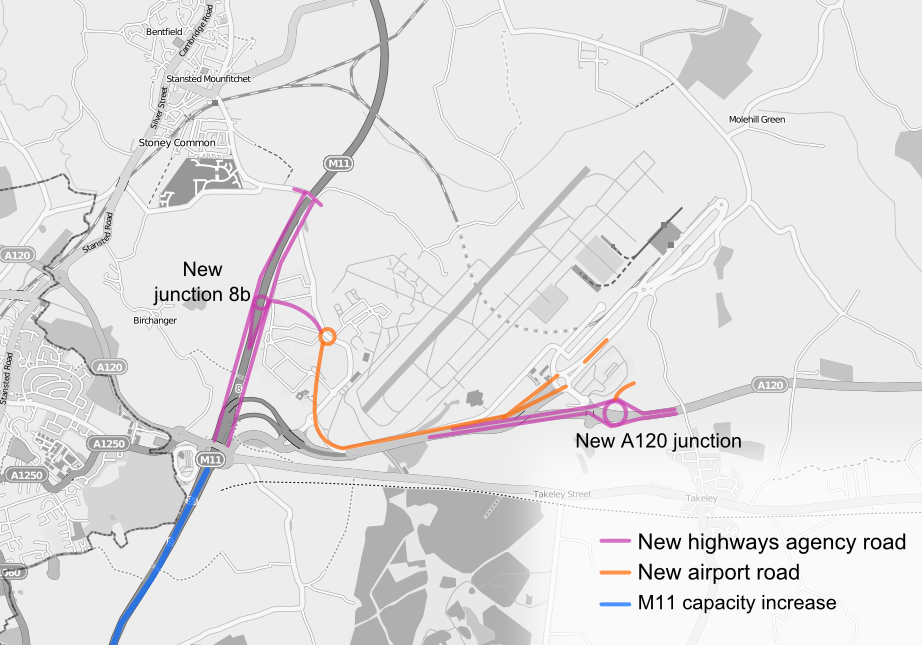
- A map showing the proposed road development at the entry to Stansted Airport
- Location: Essex
- Proposer: Highways Agency
- Status: suspended
- Type: Road
- Cost estimate: £131 million

A joint scheme involving works on junctions on the M11 and A120. This scheme was part of an aborted plan to add a second runway to Stansted Airport. It proposed changes to junction 8 of the M11 with the creation of junction 8B, linked to and situated just north of junction 8/8A and the creation of a new junction on the A120, to provide additional rapid access to the expanded airport. The scheme was given an estimated cost of £131 million in May 2008.

A number of public consultations and exhibitions were held throughout 2007. Findings from these showed that although the public had several concerns regarding environmental impact 57% of attendees agreed the scheme would be necessary if the Stansted Airport expansion proceeded. Following the public consultation, the preferred route was published on 5 March 2008 and the draft orders on 27 March 2008. A pre-public inquiry meeting took place on 10 November 2008, with a public inquiry due in April 2009. However, this was delayed until further notice following BAA's appeal against the March 2009 ruling of the Competition Commission and the proposal lapsed when the application for a second runway was withdrawn by BAA in 2010.

== Incidents ==
=== Plane crash ===
On 2 June 2002, a brake failure on an Aero L-39 Albatross landing at the Imperial War Museum Duxford caused the plane to run off the end of the runway and down an embankment onto the southbound carriageway of the motorway. The trainee pilot was killed when he ejected at ground level, but the instructor survived the accident and no vehicles on the motorway were involved. The main runway at Duxford had been shortened in 1977 from 6,000 feet (1,800 m) to 4,800 feet (1,500 m) when the motorway was built. More recently, even though Duxford already met all licensing requirements, the declared length was reduced to 4,010 feet (1,220 m) to increase safety further than existing measures.

=== Snow storm ===
In January 2003, thousands of motorists became stranded on "White Friday" for up to 20 hours between junctions 7 and 9 during a snowstorm.

== Junctions ==
Data from driver location signs are used to provide distance and carriageway identifier information.

M11 motorway junctions
mile	km	Southbound exits (B carriageway)	Junction	Northbound exits (A carriageway)	Coordinates
7.5	12.1	North Circular A406 (West) (A10, A1), West End; The City, Docklands, Blackwall Tunnel (A12, A13), A406 South	J4	Start of motorway	51.5978°N 0.0438°E
		Entering Greater London		Entering Essex	
11.4	18.4	No access	J5	Debden, Loughton A1168	51.6404°N 0.0842°E
14.7	23.6	Watford, Oxford, Heathrow Airport, M1, M40, M4 M25(W); Gatwick Airport, Dartford Crossing, M23, M20 M25(E)	J6	Watford, Oxford, Heathrow Airport, M1, M40, M4 M25(W) Gatwick Airport, Dartford Crossing, M23, M20 M25(E)	51.6794°N 0.1250°E
19.1	30.7	Chelmsford, Harlow A414	J7	Harlow A414	51.7432°N 0.1377°E
22.6	36.3	Harlow A1025	J7A	Harlow A1025	51.7886°N 0.1704°E
28.9	46.5	Bishop's Stortford, Services, Colchester, Stansted A120	J8; Services	Bishop's Stortford, Services A120(W)	51.8717°N 0.1992°E
29.2	47.0	No access	J8A	Stansted, Colchester A120(E)	51.8689°N 0.1972°E
		Entering Essex		Entering Cambridgeshire	
43.3	69.7	No access	J9	Newmarket, Norwich, M11 (A11).	52.0587°N 0.1891°E
29.2	47.0	No access	J9A	Saffron Walden, B184, Cambridge, A1301. Spur continues as A11.	52.0759°N 0.1931°E
45.9	73.9	Saffron Walden, Duxford, (A1307 Haverhill) A505	J10	Royston, Duxford A505	52.0986°N 0.1381°E
50.8	81.7	Royston A10; Cambridge A1309	J11	Harston A10; Cambridge A1309	52.1602°N 0.1034°E
53.4	85.9	Cambridge, Sandy A603	J12	Cambridge, Sandy A603	52.1894°N 0.0743°E
55.1	88.6	No access	J13	Cambridge, Bedford A1303	52.2118°N 0.0776°E
56.2	90.4	St Neots A428	J14	Newmarket A14 Ely (A10)	52.2306°N 0.0707°E
		Start of motorway, Non-motorway traffic: Cambridge, Newmarket A14		Road continues north as A14 towards The Midlands, which then becomes the M6 motorway towards The North West, and finally, the A74(M) in Scotland, and ends in Glasgow.	52.2404°N 0.0581°E

== In popular culture ==
Life in the Fast Lane: The No M11 Story (1995) is a documentary film that recounts the story of the No M11 Campaign.

== See also ==
- List of motorways in the United Kingdom
