= Ipswich Road, Colchester =

Road in Colchester, England

Coordinates: 51.89320°N 0.91773°E

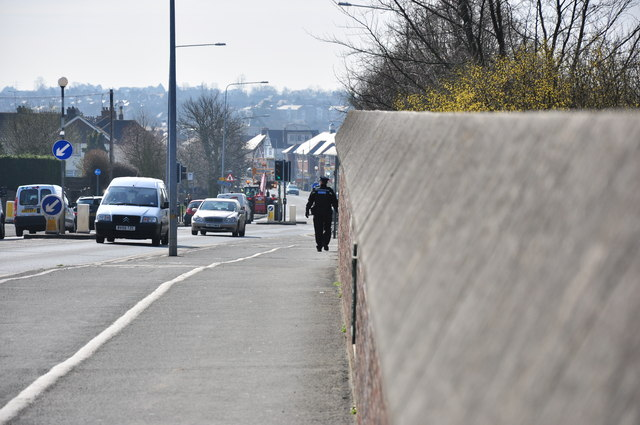
Looking south on Ipswich Road from the Great Eastern Main Line towards Colchester town centre

Ipswich Road, formally the A1232, is a road in Colchester, Essex, England. It was the historic coaching route and main road to Ipswich from the Middle Ages onwards, and was part of the A12, a main road in East Anglia, until the A12 was rerouted in 1974.

Rovers Tye Farm, a pub since 1983, was established by 1353, and a causeway at this location had been built by 1429, by which point Ipswich Road ran on its current route. The road once contained the County Gaol and County Police Station. The Grade II listed St. John's Church was built in 1864 by Arthur Blomfield in the High Victorian Early Gothic style. The toothpaste tube manufacturer Betts opened a factory at No. 505 Ipswich Road in 1953. More recently there have been the development of housing and industrial estates along the road, particularly automobile dealers, at the northern end where it meets the A12.

== Route ==
The road runs northeast from East Street, crossing the Great Eastern Main Line, to Ardleigh Wick where it meets the A12, a major road from London to Ipswich and the Port of Felixstowe and the A120 to Harwich (and hence by ferry to Hook of Holland).

The majority of the road is within the Borough of Colchester aside from a small portion at the northern end, which is in the Tendring District. The main bus routes from Colchester to Ipswich, 93 and 94, run along the road. It also serves a portion of the Colchester half marathon route.

== History ==
=== Pre 20th century ===
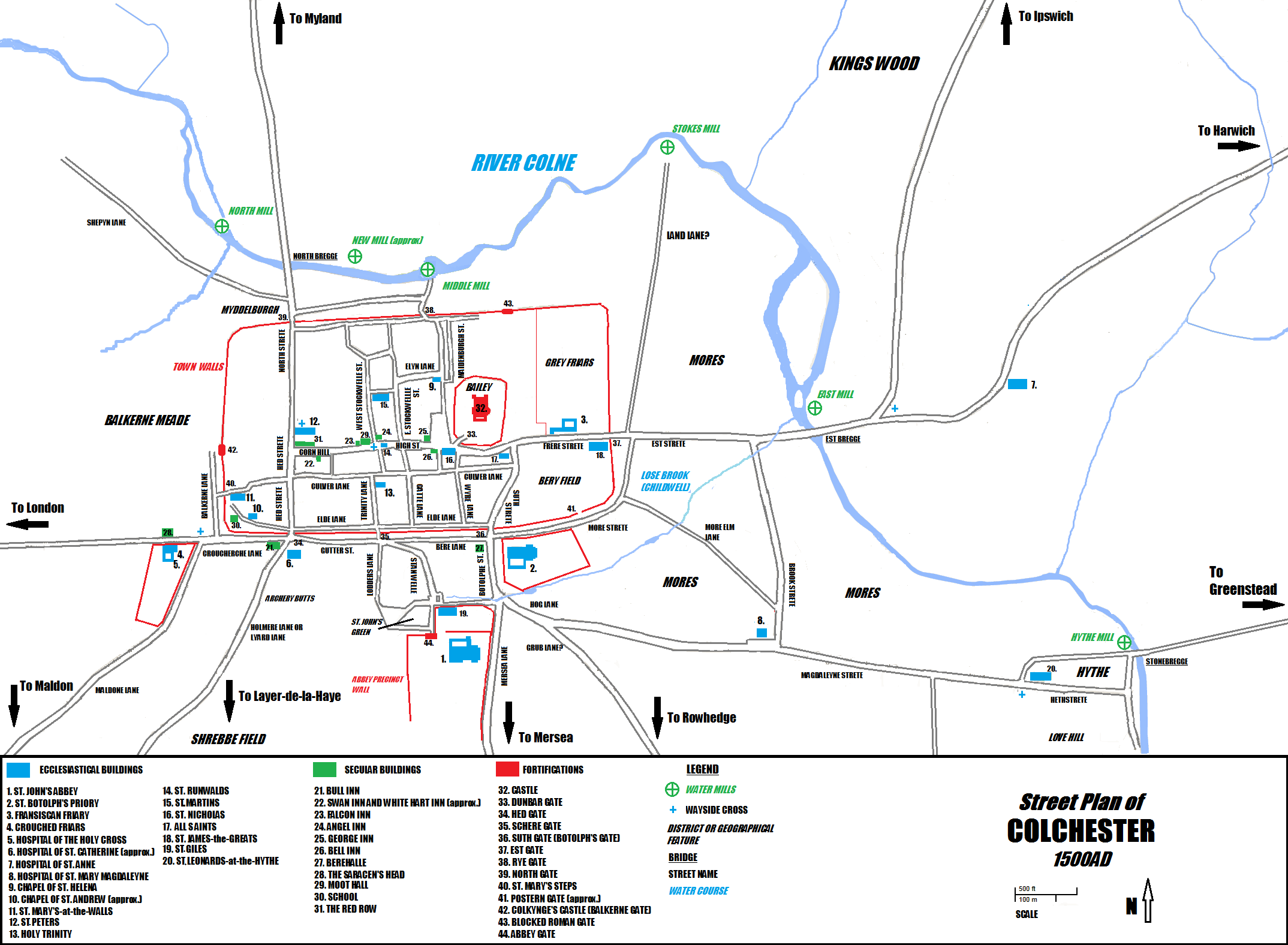
Colchester around 1500. The Ipswich road branches north off the Harwich Road, which runs towards the northeast.

Colchester has been inhabited since pre-Roman Britain, but the ancient route to Ipswich followed a different path, leaving Duncan's Gate and heading east of Castle Park and crossing the River Colne, thereby heading northeast to meet the current road. An excavation in 1930 found evidence of road ditches on this alignment. In 991 Byrhtnoth, Ealdorman of the East-Saxons, decided to check the Danes. They had plundered Ipswich and were sailing south to plunder Maldon. Brihtnoth entered the well-defended town of Colchester by the Ipswich road on his way south, later dying at the Battle of Maldon. The London–Ipswich road passing through Colchester provided a vital economic connection to the capital, 51 miles (82 km) away, during the Tudor period. The royalist defenders of Colchester during the English Civil War (1642–51) built Fort Suffolk to the north of Ipswich Road, one of eleven earthen fieldworks with timber palisades.

At the edge of the Greenstead Parish boundary is Rovers Tye Farm, which has been documented as being established by 1353. A new causeway at this location had been built by 1429, by which point Ipswich Road ran on its current route. This road was turnpiked in 1725, when the road was predominantly rural in nature. In 1841, a prison, known as the House of Correction or County Gaol, was built on the road to alleviate pressure on Colchester Castle, but it only held about 25 or 30 prisoners, both male and female, at any one time. When the War Office re-authorized the militia in 1845 the 14th East Essex Regiment of Militia, which later became the Essex Rifles Militia, was given the old County Gaol as its headquarters. In 1875, the County Police Station was located on the Ipswich Road.

=== 20th – 21st century ===
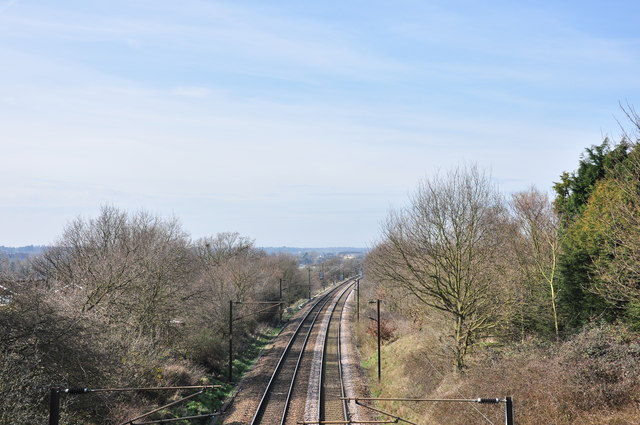
Looking west down the mainline from the Ipswich Road Bridge

The road was bisected by the first Colchester Bypass in 1933, an unemployment relief project. The railway bridge was also built in the Great Depression of the 1930s, using government funding. 7-ton locomotives were used to bring sand via a light railway from a pit on the Harwich Road to form the embankment for the railway bridge. The sand was topped with clay. The bridge crossing the Great Eastern Main Line underwent major reconstruction in 1957.

On 12 November 1940 Colchester was bombed by German air raids, causing damage in the vicinity of Ipswich Road.

In the early hours of 25th April 1944, a crew of seven on board a Royal Air Force Lancaster (UM-K2 serial DV 177) were returning from a bombing raid on Karlsruhe, Germany, when the aircraft was attacked by a German nightfighter. With one engine on fire and the flames having spread along the fuselage, the crew attempted to land at Boxted airfield, where the Americans switched on the runway landing lights. The Lancaster just failed to reach Boxted and crashed near to what is now Safestore on Ipswich Road, killing all seven crew, four British and three Canadian. In 2013 a group of Colcestrians interested in the Second World War, inspired by one of their number who, as a boy, had actually seen the Lancaster just before it crashed, erected a memorial near the site, with the kind permission of Safestore. A memorial service was held in 2013, on the anniversary of the crash, and has been held every year since. The Colchester Gazette has recorded these services every year, the 2015 article including a picture of the service :

In December 2014, 24 World War II bombs weighing approximately 600 lbs in total were discovered at a recycling centre on the road. After the war, there were small private developments off Mersea Road, "west of Lexden Park, north of Colchester North railway station, between Ipswich Road and the railway, and north of East Hill". St. John's housing estate was built in the 1960s, and in 1979, the Kier Group began developing the 730 acre High Woods site to the west of the road. Around 4000 houses and a shopping centre were subsequently built in the vicinity.

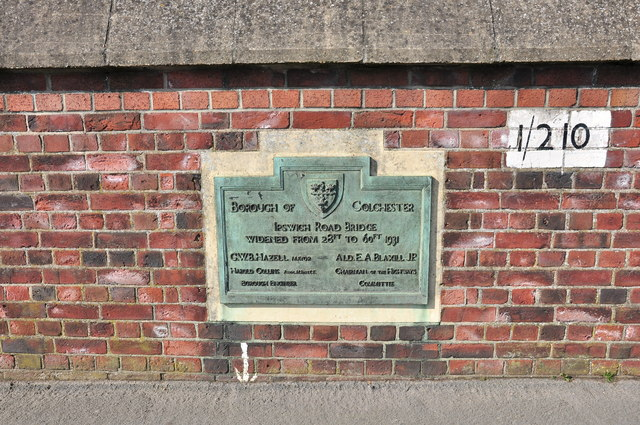
A plaque commemorating the widening of Ipswich Road Bridge in 1931

The toothpaste tube manufacturer Betts opened a factory at No. 505 Ipswich road in 1953. In 2008, the firm decided to close the factory and moved to smaller premises elsewhere in town. In 2014, Bellway Homes announced they would convert the former Ipswich Road factory into a housing estate named Avellana Place. Locals protested against the name, which is Spanish for hazelnut, saying a more appropriate name would be after the 1944 Lancaster Bomber crash. The group of friends who established the memorial to the Lancaster crew approached Colchester Borough Council who kindly agreed to name the seven roads in the estate after the seven members of the Lancaster crew, and the entry road to the estate is named Lancaster Approach, with a metal silhouette of a Lancaster as part of the road sign.

The road was part of the A12 when road numbers were first classified in 1922, and remained the main route to Ipswich for motor traffic until the Northern Colchester Bypass opened in 1974, which was extended towards Harwich in 1982.

== Landmarks ==
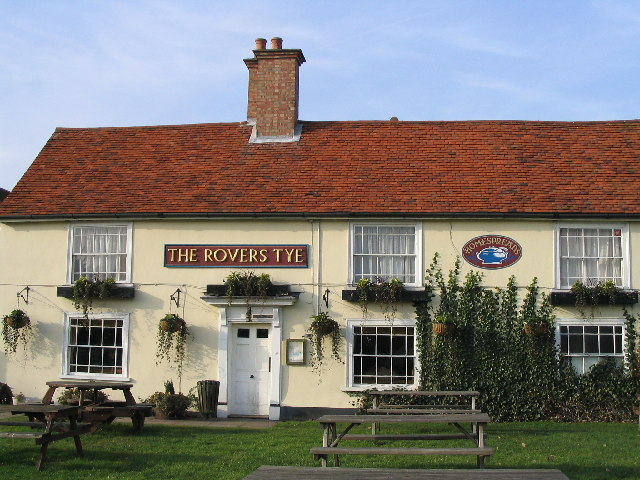
The Rovers Tye on Ipswich Road has previously been a farmhouse, with records dating back to the 14th century.

The Rose And Crown is at the southern end of Ipswich Road. It was established as a coaching inn in the 14th century and used as a stopping point for prisoners being transported from Europe and Suffolk to London. The building still contains two cells, retaining their original doors. The venue's fireplace dates from the Tudor period.

Beyond the railway bridge is the St Johns Post Office and Milton Lodge at No. 290 Ipswich Road, almost opposite it. Milton Lodge is a residential care home for elderly dementia sufferers and was converted into a care home in 2001. Further north, at the roundabout with Highwoods Approach and St. John's Road, is The Rovers Tye – Flaming Grill restaurant. The Rovers Tye is set in a Grade II listed farmhouse dated to the 17th century, with additional extensions in the mid-18th, although an earlier building dated to 1353. In 1983, the building became a pub. Timber framed, it is a two-storey building with five windows and a panelled door. Just to the north is St. John's Primary School, and St. John's Church beyond this. The church was built in 1864 by Arthur Blomfield in the High Victorian Early Gothic style. It is built from "red and gault brick with stone dressings and peg tile gabled roofs" and features a "circular bell turret with conical roof". It became a Grade II listed building in 1986.

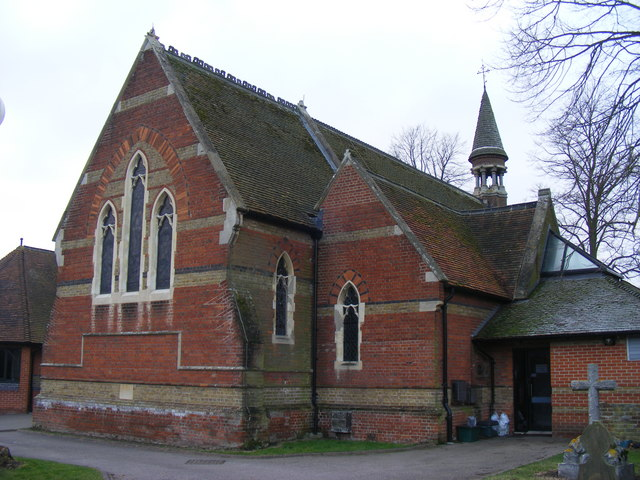
St John's Church

The northern part of the road is characterised by industrial estates. There is retail centre selling cars, including Porsche Centre Colchester and Underwoods Mazda and Autoway Colchester. Colchester Business Park is at the northern end of the road, next to the A12 and A120. It contains 250,000 square feet (23,000 m^{2}) of office space. It contains the Premier Inn and further car retailers such as Cooper BMW and Glyn Hopkin Honda.
