= A142 road =

Road in England

A142

Route information
- Length: 25.9 mi (41.7 km)

Major junctions
- South end: Newmarket
- A10; A14 A1123 A1304 A1421 A141
- North-West end: Chatteris

Location
- Country: United Kingdom
- Primary destinations: Newmarket; Soham; Ely; Chatteris

Road network
- Roads in the United Kingdom; Motorways; A and B road zones

The A142 is a road that runs from Newmarket in Suffolk to Chatteris in Cambridgeshire.

== History ==
A. Monk Ltd, of Padgate, were given the £1.8m contract for the Soham bypass in October 1980.
