= Milton, Cambridgeshire =

Village in Cambridgeshire, England

Coordinates: 52.24347°N 0.16147°E

Milton
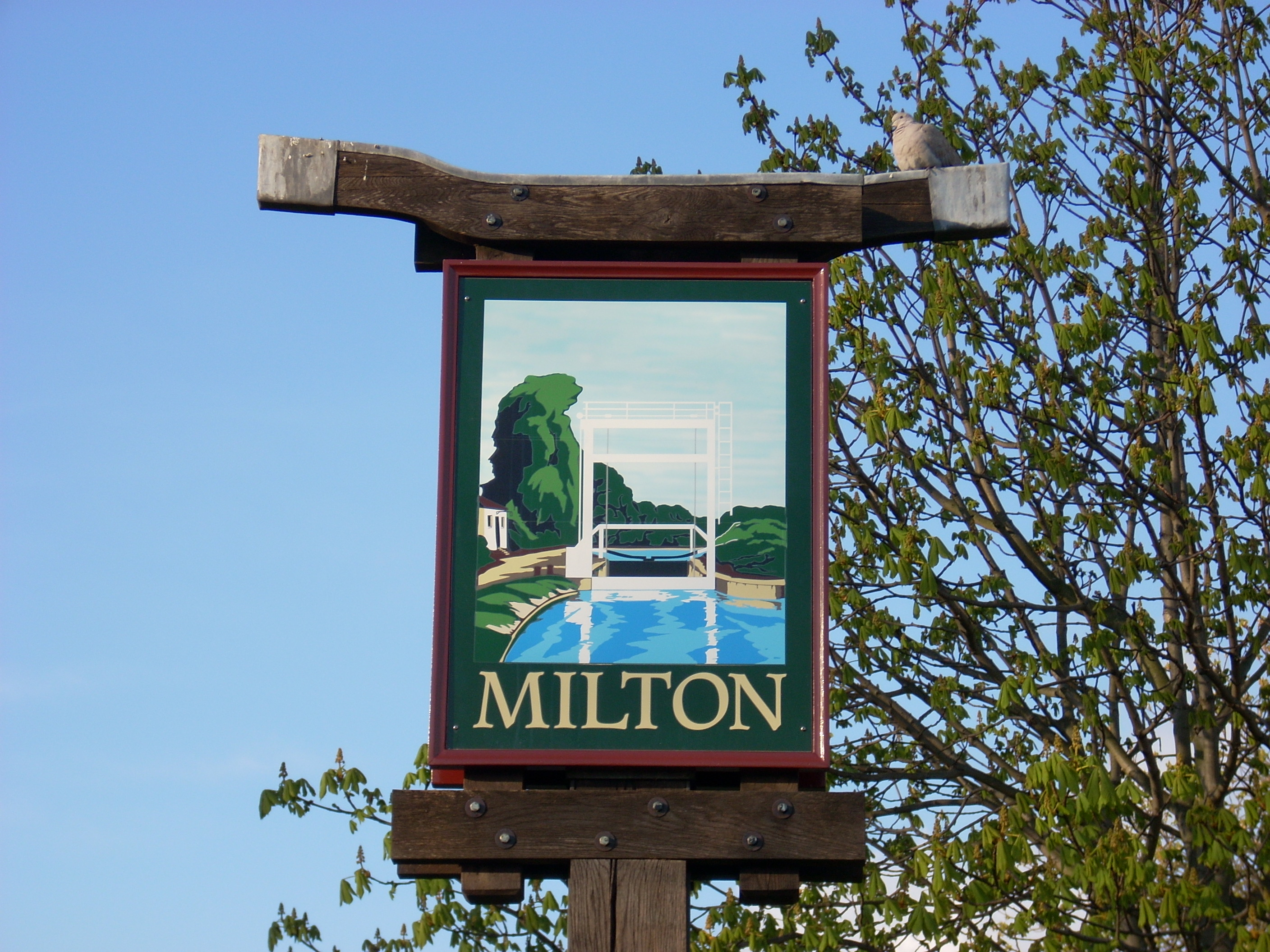

- Location within Cambridgeshire
- Population: 4,400
- District: South Cambridgeshire
- Shire county: Cambridgeshire
- Region: East
- Country: England
- Sovereign state: United Kingdom
- Post town: CAMBRIDGE
- Postcode district: CB24
- Dialling code: 01223
- Police: Cambridgeshire
- Fire: Cambridgeshire
- Ambulance: East of England
- UK Parliament: Ely and East Cambridgeshire

Milton is a village just north of Cambridge, England, with a population for the village and greater parish of 4,400 in the 2021 census down from 4,679 at the 2011 census.

== History ==
Milton grew from a small population of 31 peasants in 1086, growing slowly up to 170 people making up 40 families in 1728. The Ordnance Survey map of 1897 shows the extent of the buildings to be clustered around the High Street and Fen Road, with Milton Hall occupying the greatest area. Compared with the Ordnance Survey map of 1901 showing just a modest expansion, but already possessing its two churches as well a school, smithy, brewery, and five public houses. The population expanded to around 740 then remained fairly static in the period of the 1910s to the 1950s, the parish then grew more rapidly to greater than 1,700 in 1971.

Milton expanded considerably in the late 1980s when two large housing estates were built between the bypass and the village. This resulted in a doubling of the population between the 1981 and 1991 censuses.

The latest expansion started in 2012 with the development of the North Lodge Park consisting of 88 homes, two football pitches, pavilion and car park, with the first residents moving in April 2014.

The A10 bypass was built between 1976 and 1978 around the west edge of village, splitting Butt Lane into two parts. As part of the Great Eastern Railway the Cambridge-Ely line was opened in 1845 bypassing the village to the east but with no station. Cambridge North railway station, opened in May 2017, is within the parish boundaries but approximately 1.6 miles walk/bike from the centre of the village.

== Facilities ==
The village possesses four pubs, three of which are Grade II listed buildings. A brewery, Milton Brewery, established in June 1999, moved to nearby Waterbeach in July 2012, although the village had previously had a brewery on Fen Road as early as 1901. There are two churches: All Saints' Church, which serves the Church of England parish of Milton, and a New Apostolic Church.

The village has a primary school but no secondary school. Most pupils continue their education at Impington Village College, Cottenham Village College or St. Bede's School, Cambridge. There is also an Agricultural College, part of the College of West Anglia. The original village school was located in Fen Road, whereas the modern one is on Butt Lane, but the original building no longer exists.

The Cambridge Science Park lies within the civil parish boundaries, notably the innovative-looking Napp Research Centre. It is separated from the main body of the village by the A14 dual carriageway road, but still accessible by foot/bike via the Jane Coston cycle bridge.

Land between Milton and Waterbeach has been purchased for building a rowing lake by Cambridge Sport Lakes. Plans for an international-standard 8-lane rowing lake have been under consideration in Cambridge for many years. The original planning permission for the rowing lake was granted in 1995 but subsequently lapsed. However, permission was granted again in 2007.

On 25 February 2015 the UK Footgolf Association opened its East of England headquarters in Milton on the site of the former Milton Park Golf Course. They host many tournaments, including the UK FootGolf International Open from 2015.

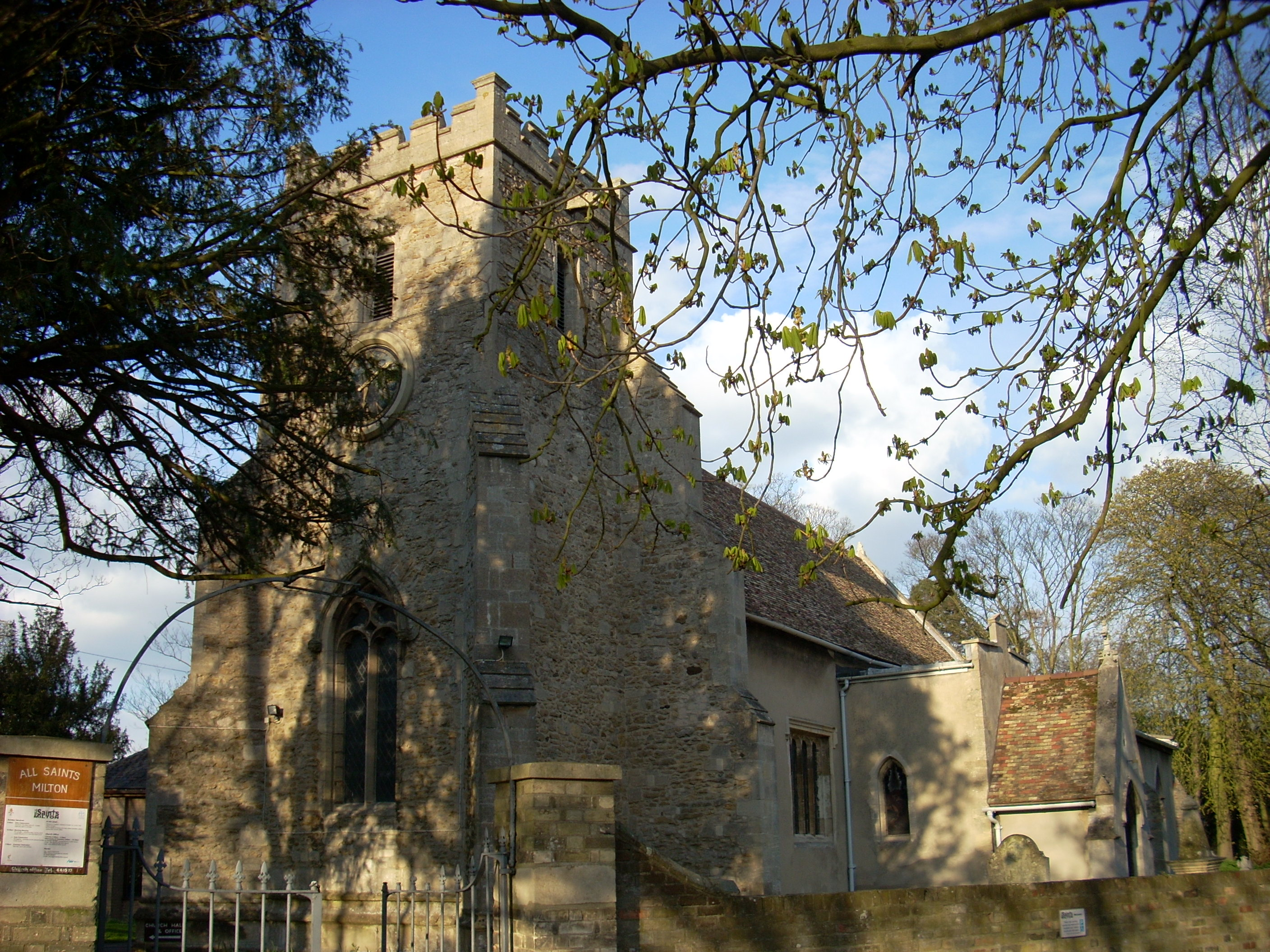
Church of All Saints'

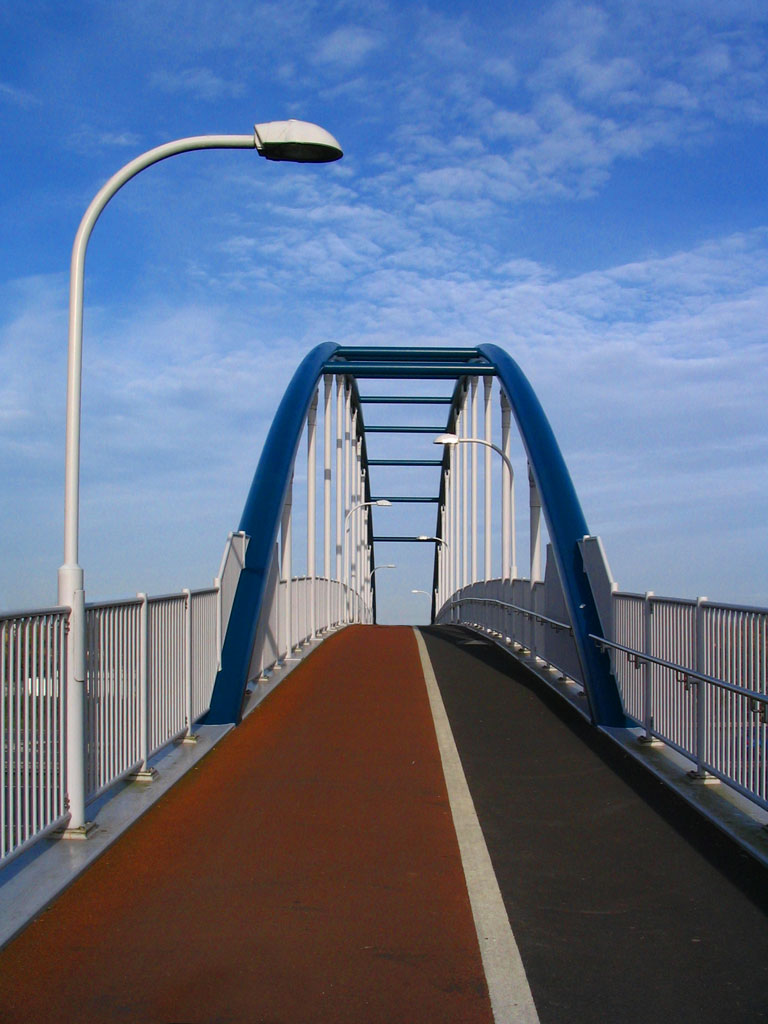
Jane Coston cycle bridge between Milton and Cambridge over the A14

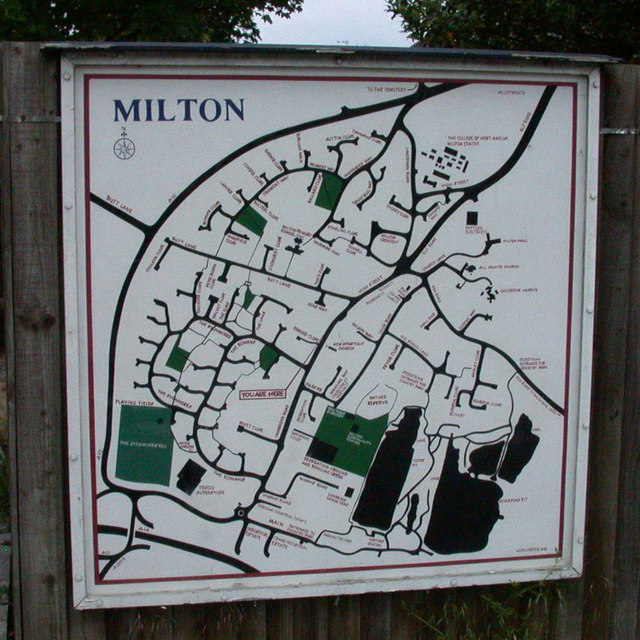
Village map located at the southern end of the High Street

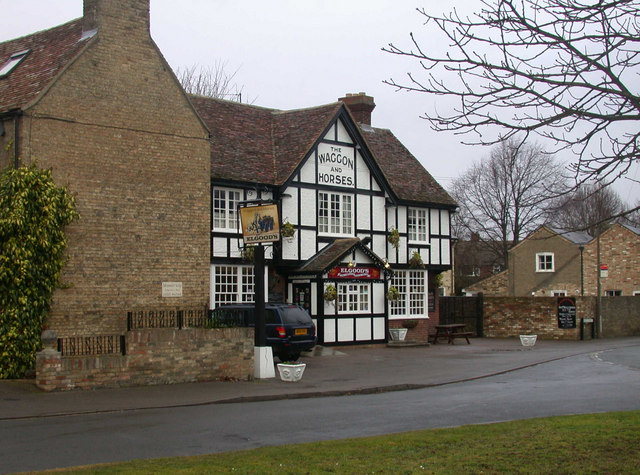
The Waggon and Horses

== Environmental issues ==
Milton has acquired a reputation for having an unpleasant smell – the "Milton Pong" – caused by its proximity to the Cambridge Sewage Works and two recycling centres. South Cambridgeshire District Council took legal action against Anglian Water in 2003. In 2014, residents were asked to use an online "pong log" to encourage the authorities to make improvements. A £21 million upgrade to the sewage works, due to be completed in 2015, was intended to reduce the smells. After the upgrades Milton Parish Council reported that the smells had lessened but a working party and parish council air quality group had been setup to monitor.

In 2023 Silsoe Odours completed a series of tests for Anglian Water measuring the perceived offense of smells from the sewage works in the area. The survey was allegedly part of considerations by Anglian Water to move the sewage site to an alternative location.

== Milton Country Park ==
Milton Country Park is located at the south-eastern edge of the village. It is built on the site of a former gravel pits. In 1990 work started on transforming the site into a country park. The park, which has become a haven for wildlife, officially opened in May 1993. Two flooded pits called Todd's Pit and Dickerson's Pit now form freshwater lakes, both being available for fishing, the former for carp, the latter for general silver fish and pike. A smaller pool named Hall's Pool between the pits has a dipping platform, while Deep Pool, the deepest pit in the park lies to the north of Dickerson's Pit.

A network of over two miles of paths leads around the park; many of these paths are suitable for bicycles and wheelchairs as well as those on foot.

The park's financial future became uncertain when South Cambridgeshire District Council announced that, due to the 2005 Council Tax capping, they could not continue to fund the park and were looking for a new body to do so, and that if that was unsuccessful they would close the park. A campaign to save the park collected over 10,000 signatures. In July 2007, the council agreed in principle to hand the management of the park to Cambridge Sport Lakes Trust which it did on 31 March 2008.

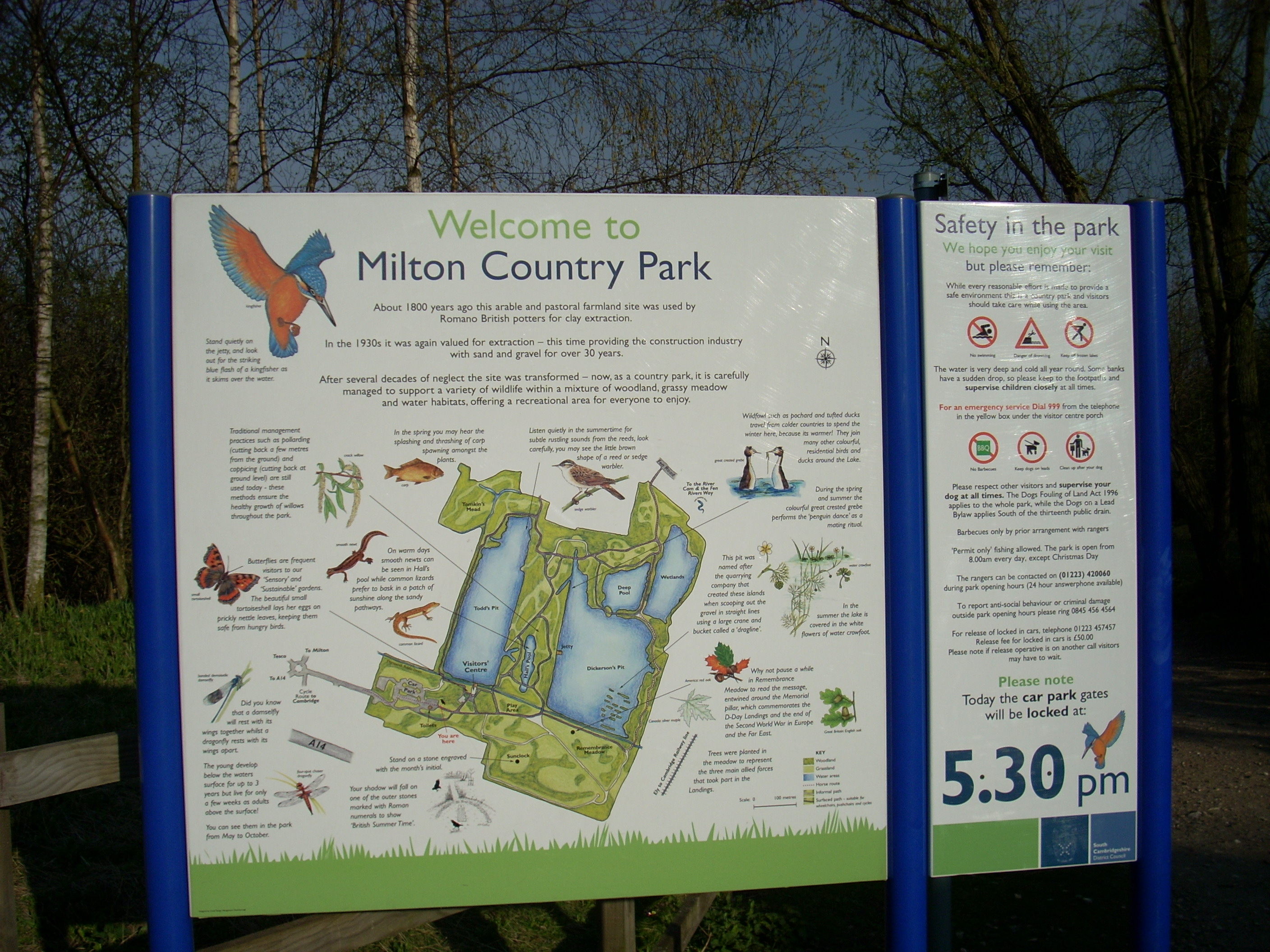
Entrance to Milton Country Park

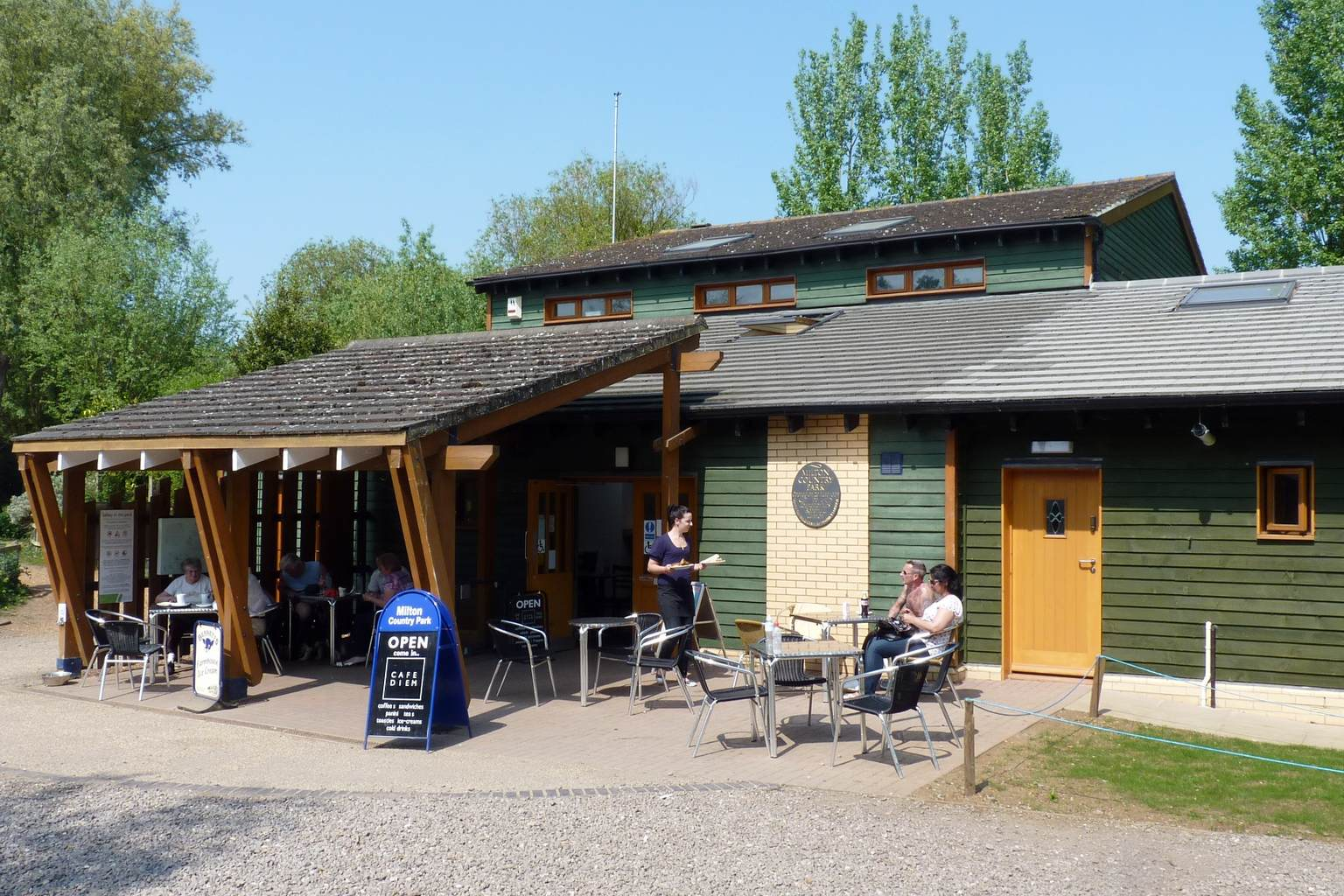
Milton Country Park Visitor Centre with a cafeteria selling snacks

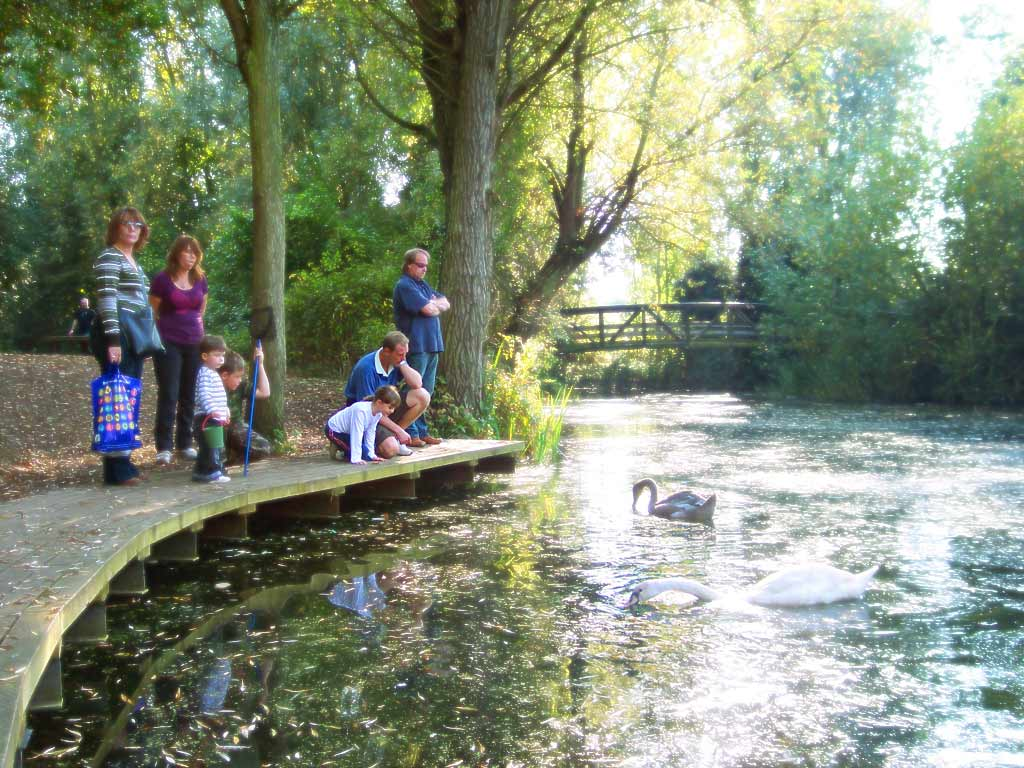
Hall's Pool in Milton Country Park

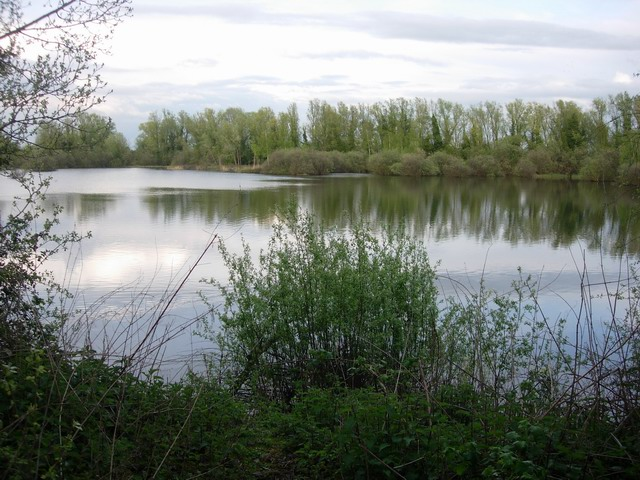
Milton Country Park South end of Dickerson's Pit

== Exclave ==
Milton is one of 14 parishes in England still to contain a detached portion. The area of Chesterton Fen constitutes Milton’s exclave.
