= Grade separated junction =

A grade-separated junction is a transport junction where at least one bridge or tunnel is used to separate traffic flows (known as grade separation).

Relevant articles include:

- Road interchanges, known as grade-separated junctions in the UK
- A flying junction, a type of grade-separated junction found on railway lines
