= Peashooter (toy) =

Toy blowgun

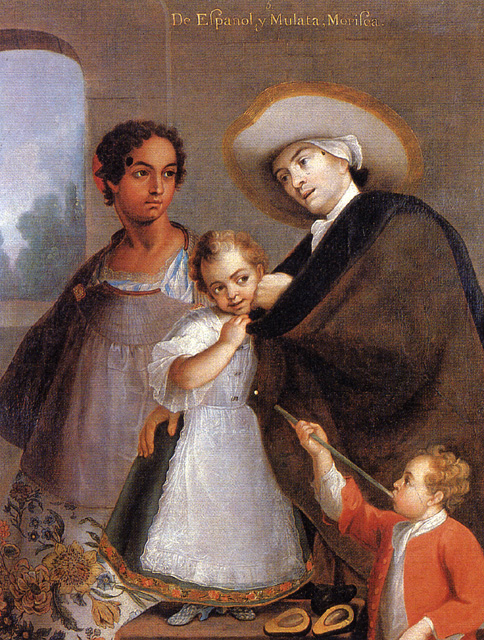
1763 casta painting by Miguel Cabrera showing a boy playing with a peashooter

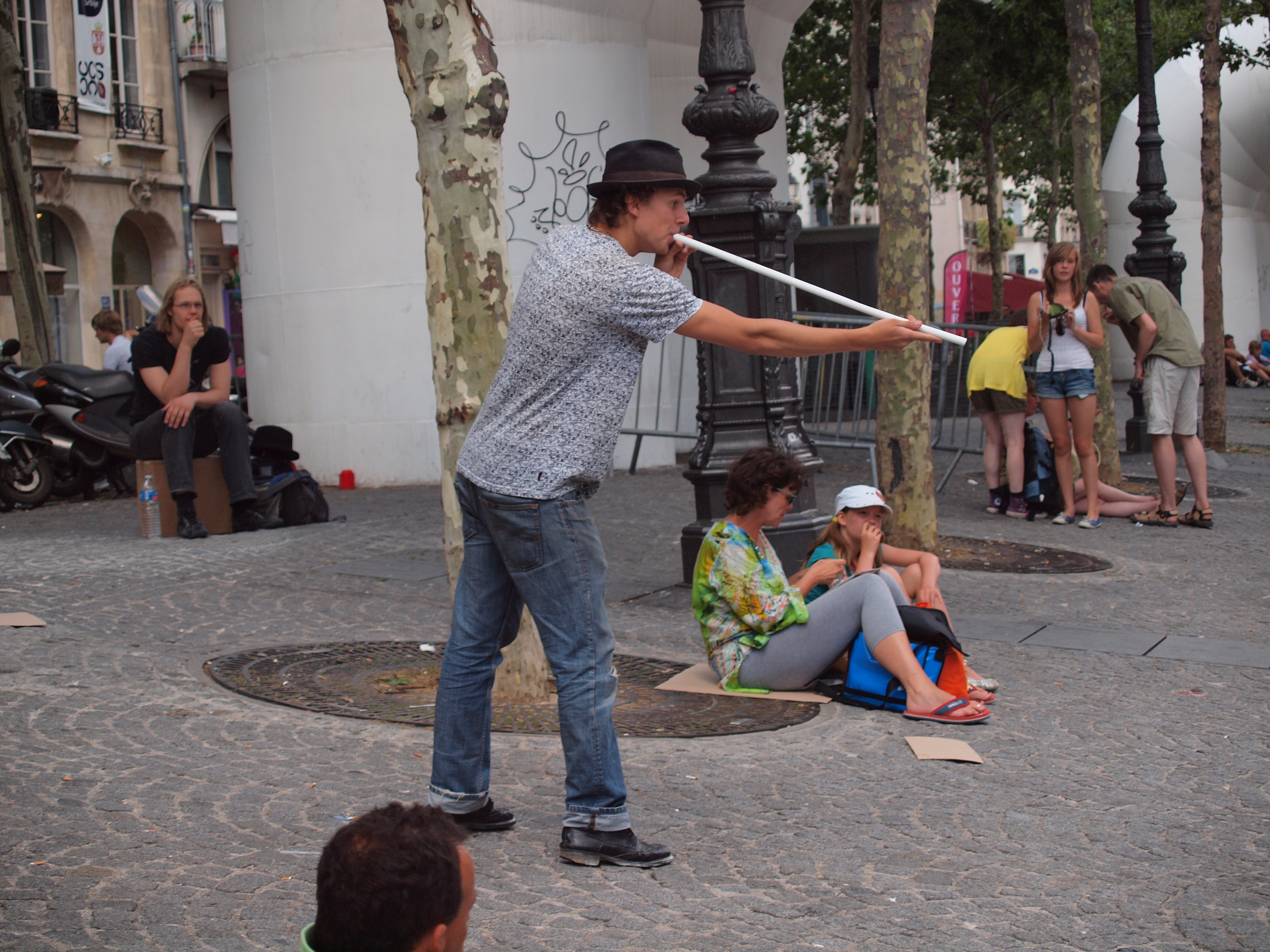
A peashooter in use

The peashooter (sometimes spelled pea-shooter or pea shooter) is a toy version of the blowgun or blowpipe. It is usually a tube that launches its projectiles via blowing. As the name suggests, the normal ammunition is peas (usually dried), though other seeds, fruits, improvised darts, or wadded up paper can also be used.

== History ==
The first depictions of peashooters can be found in 18th-century pinturas de castas (casta paintings), which reveal details about the daily lives of ordinary people in colonial Mexico. Some of these paintings depict children with peashooters and visible projectiles, indicating that the toy was a common form of play during that era.

== Peashooting ==
Peashooting (sometimes spelled pea-shooting or pea shooting) is the act of shooting dried peas out of a tube, a peashooter, by blowing through it. A similar effect can be achieved by using small bits of paper instead of peas. A sport has developed around pea shooting in which peas are shot into a target, similar to those used for archery. The target may be made of a soft substance (putty) so that the peas will stick into it or at least make indentations that easily identify the location of the hit. The World Pea Shooting Championships are held annually in the village of Witcham, UK.
