= World Pea Shooting Championships =

Annual competition in Cambridgeshire, England

The World Pea Shooting Championships have been held annually since 1971 on the second Saturday in July, in the village of Witcham near Ely in Cambridgeshire, England, and has attracted competitors from as far afield as the US, Canada, Scandinavia, France, Spain, New Zealand and Holland.

Both the 2020 and 2021 events have been cancelled due to the COVID-19 pandemic, and the 2022 event was also cancelled due to fears that the activity may spread COVID-19

The World Pea Shooting Championships made a return after 4 years, on Saturday 8 July 2023.

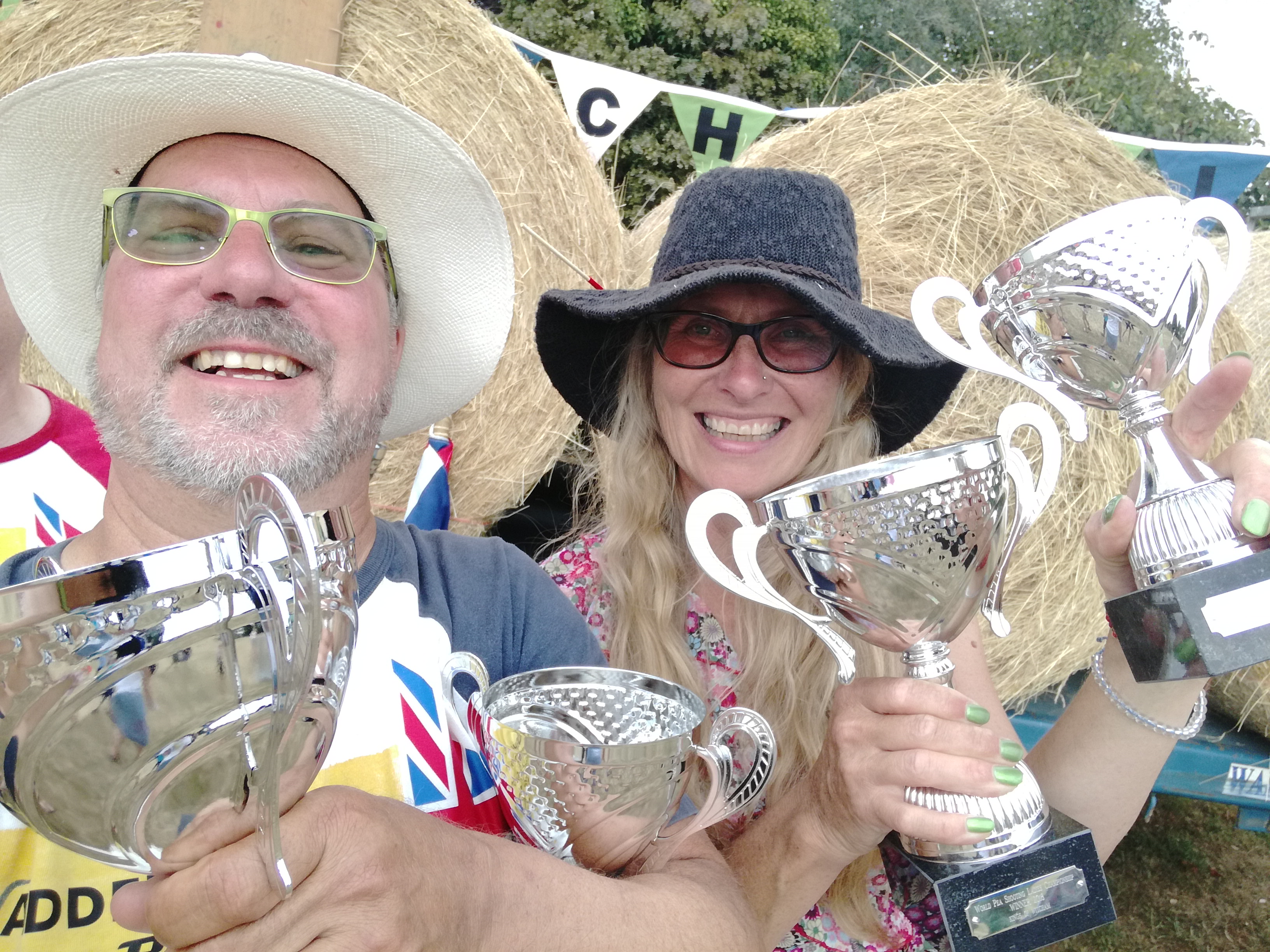
The 48th World Pea Shooting Cham-pea-ons

== Rules ==
- Peas are shot at a 12-inch target smeared with glazing putty.
- Anyone is permitted to enter.
- The Peashooter must not exceed 12 inches in length.
- Your peashooter cannot be shared with other competitors.
- No laser peashooters allowed in the children's event.
- There are no technology restrictions, provided peas to be propelled only by blowing air by mouth.
- The target distance is 12 feet for adults, 10 feet for over 8's, 8 feet for under 7's.
- Only peas provided may be used, five per contestant in early rounds, 10 in semi's and finals.
- Target scores are centre-ring= 5, middle-ring= 3, outer-ring= 1.

== History ==
The World Pea Shooting Championship was conceived in 1971 as a fund-raising idea for the building of a modern Village Hall by the headmaster of the village school, John Tyson (1925–2002), however, the school is long since closed, and children from Witcham now go to primary school in nearby Mepal. In 1971, the first ever World Peashooting Championship took place and the winning team was the Pymoor Peashooting Team consisting Graham Lark, Brian Taylor, Kenneth Rogers and Eddie Stearman.

In 2003, the Parish Council funded the purchase of the John Tyson Shield on which the open champion's name is recorded each year.

The competition tends to be dominated by local entrants, though a small number travel from around the world, notably the United States, and American personnel from the nearby US airbases of RAF Mildenhall and RAF Lakenheath have competed. The day is combined with village fete featuring games, stalls, and more.

Both the 2020 and 2021 events have been cancelled due to the COVID-19 pandemic.

The 2022 event was also cancelled due to fears that activity itself, involving high velocity discharge from the mouth, has a high likelihood of spreading COVID-19 to other contenders and referees. The event is expected to make a return in 2023.

== Recent champions ==
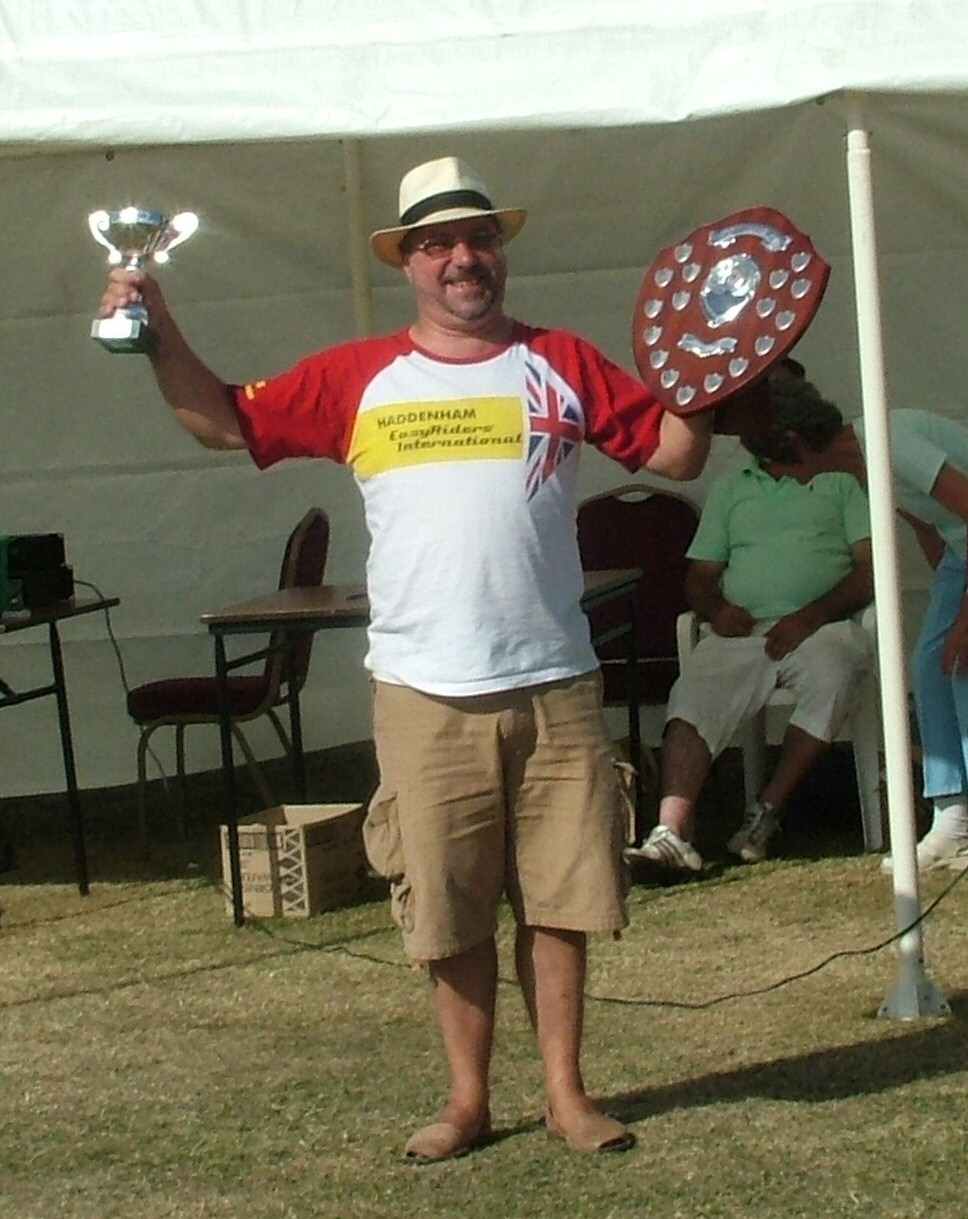
World Champion Ian Ashmeade in 2010

In 2010, Ian Ashmeade became the 40th World Pea Shooting Champion. In 2011, he retained the title beating four-time World Champion George Hollis in the semifinal, and 2009 champion Jim Collins in the final.

In 2011, Emma Watson became the Ladies' World Pea Shooting Champion despite it being the very first time she had picked up a pea shooter.

In 2012, Julie Bissmire beat Tina Pullman to win the Women's event. In the open event, Rob Bresler defeated the 2010 and 2011 champion, Ian Ashmeade, in the quarterfinals, and Jim Collins in the final.

In 2013, the ladies title went to Helen Phillips. Rob Bresler won the open event again in 2013, defeating Toby Bush in the final.

In 2014, Rob Bresler saw off 61 other competitors to retain his title. Also in 2014, Michelle Berry won the ladies title, while the junior title went to Haddenham's Martha Collins.

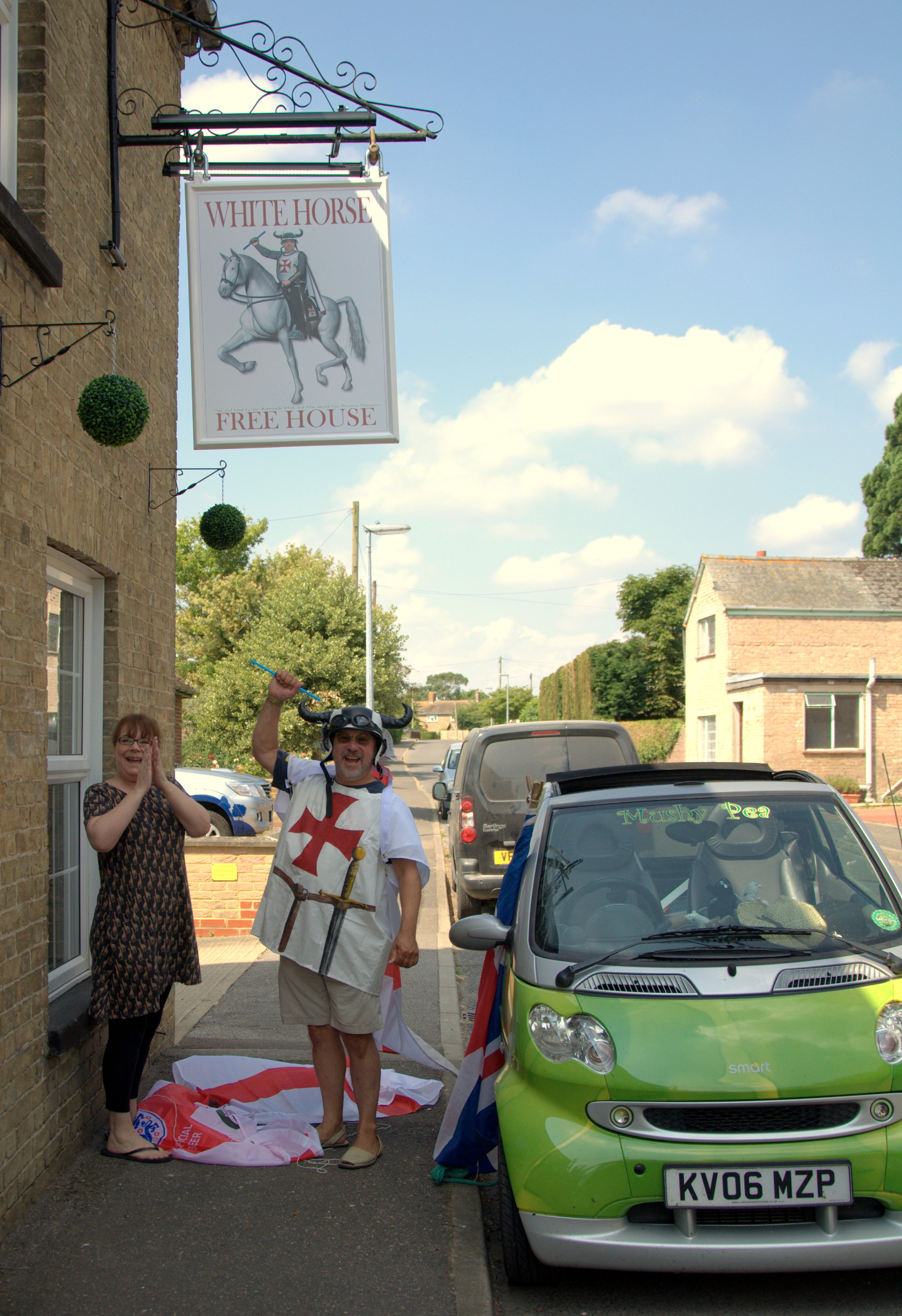
New Pub Sign for The White Horse Witcham

In 2016, at the 46th World Peashooting championships, Michelle Berry made history by regaining her Ladies title for the third consecutive year, using a laser shooter made by her father. She fought her way through a strong field, while also reaching the semi-finals in the Open championship category. After a very tense final, which went into extra time, Jim Collins went on to beat Rob Bresler to take the title of Open champion, also the third title in his career.

In 2017, Michelle Berry retained her title for the fourth consecutive year, by winning the Ladies tournament with Martha Collins as runner-up. Jim Collins beat Ian Ashmeade in the open event. Martha Collins won the junior title beating Madeline Bresler, who was the runner-up. In the team event the Haddenham Easy Riders beat Stockport Massive to the team title.

In 2018, after unveiling a new pub sign at The White Horse, Ian Ashmeade in his iconic horned helmet beat the defending champion Jim Collins, to take the 48th World Pea Shooting title after 7 years of trying. His team, the Haddenham Easy Riders, also took the team first place, only just in front of the ladies' team Pea-u-tiful featuring Ian's girlfriend Sally Redman-Davies. She then went on, at her first attempt, only having tried pea shooting the week before. She beat the defending ladies' World Champion Michelle Berry, in a tense final.

In 2019, Redman-Davies went on to successfully defend her title, beating Madeline Bresler in a tight final. The scores were level, and Redman-Davies won the tie-breaker.

In 2024, the Ladies event was abolished, no reason was given why.

== World Pea Shooting Championship results (WPSC) 1971 onwards ==
Note: All results taken from http://www.witcham.org.uk/_sgg/m1m6s6_1.htm

| WPSC | Year | Open Winner | Runner up | Lady Winner | Lady runner up | Junior winner | Junior runner up ! |
|---|---|---|---|---|---|---|---|
| 1st WPSC | 1971 | Dennis Minett | - | - | - | - | - |
| 2nd WPSC | 1972 | Dennis Minett | - | - | - | - | - |
| 3rd WPSC | 1973 | Dennis Minett | - | - | - | - | - |
| 4th WPSC | 1974 | Peter Czarnobaj | Dennis Minett | - | - | - | - |
| 5th WPSC | 1975 | Mike Curzon | - | - | - | - | - |
| 6th WPSC | 1976 | Howard Whetstone | - | - | - | - | - |
| 7th WPSC | 1977 | Mike Fordham | - | - | - | - | - |
| 8th WPSC | 1978 | Mike Fordham | - | - | - | - | - |
| 9th WPSC | 1979 | Neville Burniston | - | - | - | - | - |
| 10th WPSC | 1980 | Robert Norman | - | - | - | - | - |
| 11th WPSC | 1981 | Mike Fordham | - | - | - | - | - |
| 12th WPSC | 1982 | Robert Norman | - | Sandra Forham | - | - | - |
| 13th WPSC | 1983 | Mike Fordham | - | Helen Trent | - | - | - |
| 14th WPSC | 1984 | Mike Fordham | - | Helen Trent | - | - | - |
| 15th WPSC | 1985 | Mike Fordham | - | Jenny Danks | - | - | - |
| 16th WPSC | 1986 | Mike Fordham | - | Juliet Sole | - | - | - |
| 17th WPSC | 1987 | Robert Norman | - | Helen Trent | - | - | - |
| 18th WPSC | 1988 | John Shippey | - | Helen Trent | - | - | - |
| 19th WPSC | 1989 | Neville Burniston | - | Nicola Dale | - | - | - |
| 20th WPSC | 1990 | David Trent | - | Clare Shippey | - | - | - |
| 21st WPSC | 1991 | Leslie Setchell | - | - | - | - | - |
| 22nd WPSC | 1992 | Mike Fordham | - | - | - | - | - |
| 23rd WPSC | 1993 | Leslie Setchell | - | - | - | - | - |
| 24th WPSC | 1994 | George Hollis | - | - | - | - | - |
| 25th WPSC | 1995 | George Hollis | - | - | - | - | - |
| 26th WPSC | 1996 | Dan Sargent (United States) | - | - | - | - | - |
| 27th WPSC | 1997 | Thomas Walker | - | - | - | - | - |
| 28th WPSC | 1998 | Dan Sargent (United States) | - | - | - | - | - |
| 29th WPSC | 1999 | David Hollis | - | - | - | - | - |
| 30th WPSC | 2000 | David Hollis | - | - | - | - | - |
| 31st WPSC | 2001 | David Hollis | - | - | - | - | - |
| 32nd WPSC | 2002 | Kiel Prance | - | - | - | - | - |
| 33rd WPSC | 2003 | Danny Miles | - | - | - | - | - |
| 34th WPSC | 2004 | Percy Walker | Iain Housden | Laura Rutterford | Maureen Samochwal | Sam Cockbain | Ben Somers |
| 35th WPSC | 2005 | Ian Saberton | Iain Housden | Sandra Ashley | Irene Pointer | Edward Richardson | Lewis Bonney |
| 36th WPSC | 2006 | Sandra Ashley | Colin Long | Sandra Ashley | Silvana Taylor | Toby Saunders | Zark Bonney |
| 37th WPSC | 2007 | George Hollis | Alistair Berry | Sandra Ashley | Emma Wood | Joshua Carter | Alfie Ball |
| 38th WPSC | 2008 | George Hollis | Nathan Parratt | Pat Willars | Sophie Janacek | Roland Dickinson | Matthew Wakeham |
| 39th WPSC | 2009 | Jim Collins | Ian Ashmeade | Julie Bissmire | Helen Phillips | Daniel Menrad | Amelia Sparks-Shepherd |
| 40th WPSC | 2010 | Ian Ashmeade | Chris Hughes | Julie Bissmire | Helen Phillips | Oliver Gaffan | Charlie Cox |
| 41st WPSC | 2011 | Ian Ashmeade | Jim Collins | Emma Watson | Linda Spencer | Charlie Cox | Alfie Gillings |
| 42nd WPSC | 2012 | Rob Bresler | Jim Collins | Julie Bissmire | Tina Pullen | Callum Bogunovic | Alfie Gillings |
| 43rd WPSC | 2013 | Rob Bresler | Toby Bush | Helen Phillips | Emma Watson | Madeleine Bresler | Callum Bogunovic |
| 44th WPSC | 2014 | Rob Bresler | Victor Kronig | Michelle Berry | Rachel Cross | Martha Collins | Kieran Bogunovic |
| 45th WPSC | 2015 | Jim Collins | Allistair Berry | Michelle Berry | Aimi Bresler | Marcus Bresler | Rylee Gulliver |
| 46th WPSC | 2016 | Jim Collins | Rob Bresler | Michelle Berry | Sonija Romanova | Charlotte Collins | Martha Collins |
| 47th WPSC | 2017 | Jim Collins | Ian Ashmeade | Michelle Berry | Martha Collins | Martha Collins | Madeline Bresler |
| 48th WPSC | 2018 | Ian Ashmeade | Jim Collins | Sally Redman-Davies | Michelle Berry | Martha Collins | Henry Crook |
| 49th WPSC | 2019 | Ian Ashmeade | Rob Bresler | Sally Redman-Davies | Madeline Bresler | Martha Collins | Henry Crook |
| 2020, 2021 and 2022 (no event) | | | Championships cancelled due to COVID-19 pandemic | | | | |
| 50th WPSC | 2023 | Dan Cross | Warren Isaacs | Sally Redman-Davies | Helene Coles | Luke Young | Greyson Coles |
| 51st WPSC | 2024 | Paul Gipp | Rob Bresler | ***Ladies event abolished*** | ***Ladies event abolished*** | Oscar Morgan | Eilidh McMillan |
| 52nd WPSC | 2025 | | | | | | |

=== Roll of Honour (Multiple World Champions) ===
Mike Fordham 8, George Hollis 4, Helen Trent 4, Jim Collins 4, Michelle Berry 4, Sandra Ashley 4, Ian Ashmeade 4, Martha Collins 4, David Hollis 3, Julie Bissmire 3, Rob Bresler 3, Robert Norman 3, Dennis Minett 3, Sally Redman-Davies 3, Dan Sargent (United States) 2, Leslie Setchell 2, Neville Burniston 2.
