= Witcham Gravel helmet =

Roman cavalry helmet from the first century AD

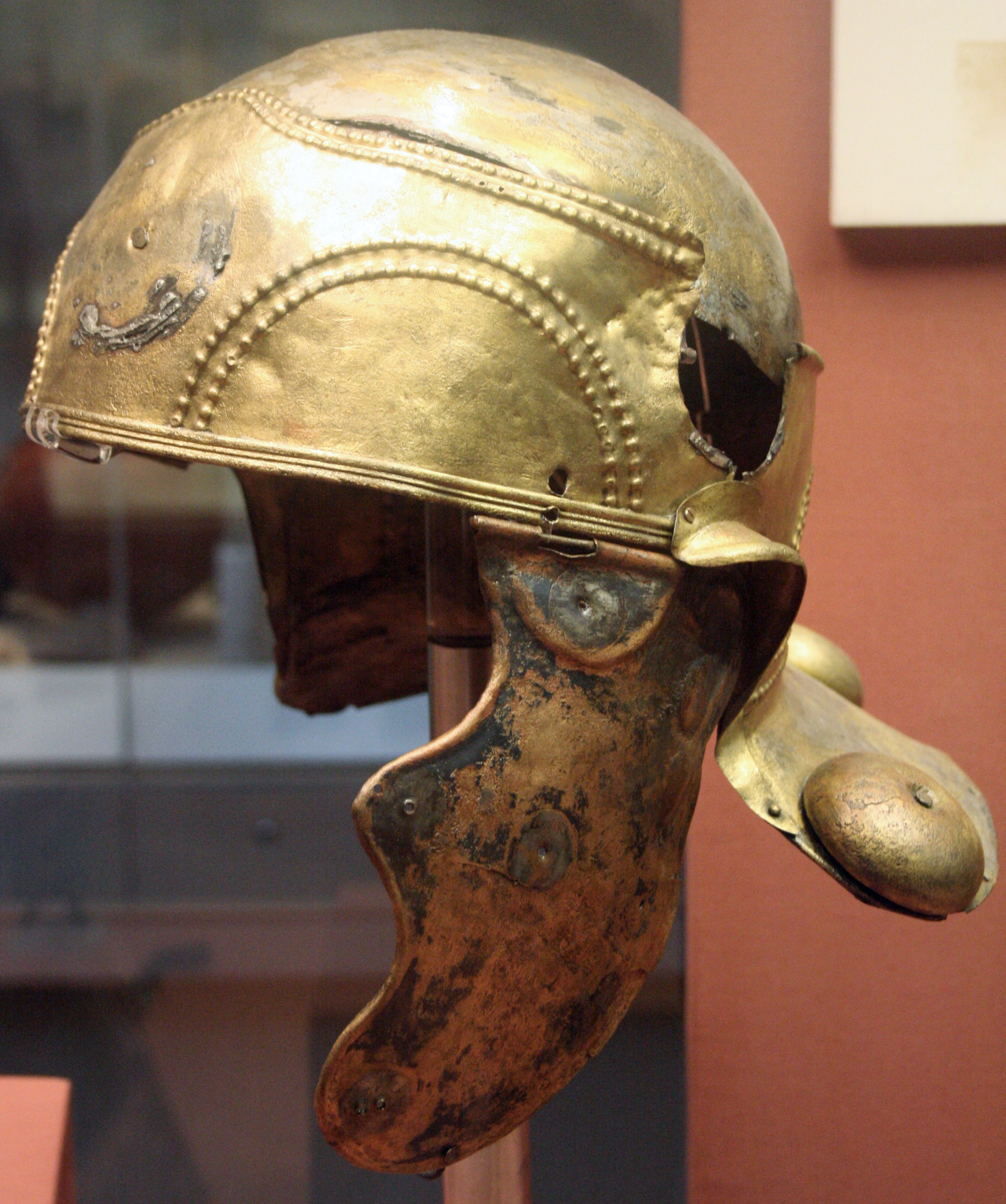
- Witcham Gravel helmet
- Material: Iron, tin, copper alloy
- Created: c. 50–75 AD
- Discovered: c. 1870s Witcham Gravel, Cambridgeshire
- Present location: British Museum
- Registration: 1891,1117.1

The Witcham Gravel helmet is a Roman auxiliary cavalry helmet from the first century AD. Only the decorative copper alloy casing remains; an iron core originally fit under the casing, but has now corroded away. The cap, neck guard, and cheek guards were originally tinned, giving the appearance of a silver helmet encircled by a gold band. The helmet's distinctive feature is the presence of three hollow bosses, out of an original six, that decorate the exterior. No other Roman helmet is known to have such a feature. They may be a decorative embellishment influenced by Etruscan helmets from the sixth century BC, which had similar, lead-filled bosses, that would have deflected blades.

The helmet was discovered during peat digging in the parish of Witcham Gravel, Cambridgeshire, perhaps during the 1870s. It was said to have been found "at a depth of about four feet", although the exact findspot within Witcham Gravel is unknown; at the time, the parish comprised about 389 acres. The helmet was first published in 1877, when, owned by Thomas Maylin Vipan, it was exhibited to the Society of Antiquaries of London. When Vipan died in 1891, the British Museum purchased it from his estate. It remains in the museum's collection, and as of 2021 is on view in Room 49.

== Description ==
The helmet primarily comprises eight components: a skull cap, a brow piece, an occiput, a neck guard, two raised ear protectors, and two cheek guards, of which one remains. The surviving pieces are made of copper alloy; the cap, neck guard, and cheek guards were tinned, creating the appearance of a gold band surrounding a silver helmet. Originally, they were attached to an iron core by two rivets on either side, six along the neck guard, and one split pin at front and at back, but the iron now remains only as corrosion at the apex of the helmet.

The surviving pieces of the helmet are almost entirely decorative, and would have imparted very little protection by themselves. They are made of thin metal, proving an easy medium for repoussé work. Four semicircular designs were made with repoussé punch marks, two each on the brow piece and the occiput. Lines of repoussé work were also punched across the join between the neck guard and occiput, and at the top of the occiput and brow piece. The unique feature of the helmet, not known on any other Roman helmet, is the presence of three hollow bosses on the neck guard. These were both soldered and riveted on; the riveting would have also helped hold the copper alloy components to the iron core. Circular remnants suggest that other bosses were placed above each ear, and over the split pin at the front. Five small bosses were likewise riveted to the ornate cheek guards, already featuring repoussage depicting naturalistic ears. None of these bosses survive, although their impressions remain. A linear mark above the dexter brow indicates that the helmet sustained a blow, but it is unknown whether this occurred before deposition, or during the turf digging that led to the helmet's discovery.

The helmet would have also had a crest. Markings at the apex of the skull cap indicate the former presence of a crest box, 20.5 centimetres (8.1 in) long by 2.3 centimetres (0.91 in) wide, joined by six rivets: two each at the front, centre, and back. The box would have been made of organic materials such as wood filled with horsehair, and has since decayed.

== Discovery ==
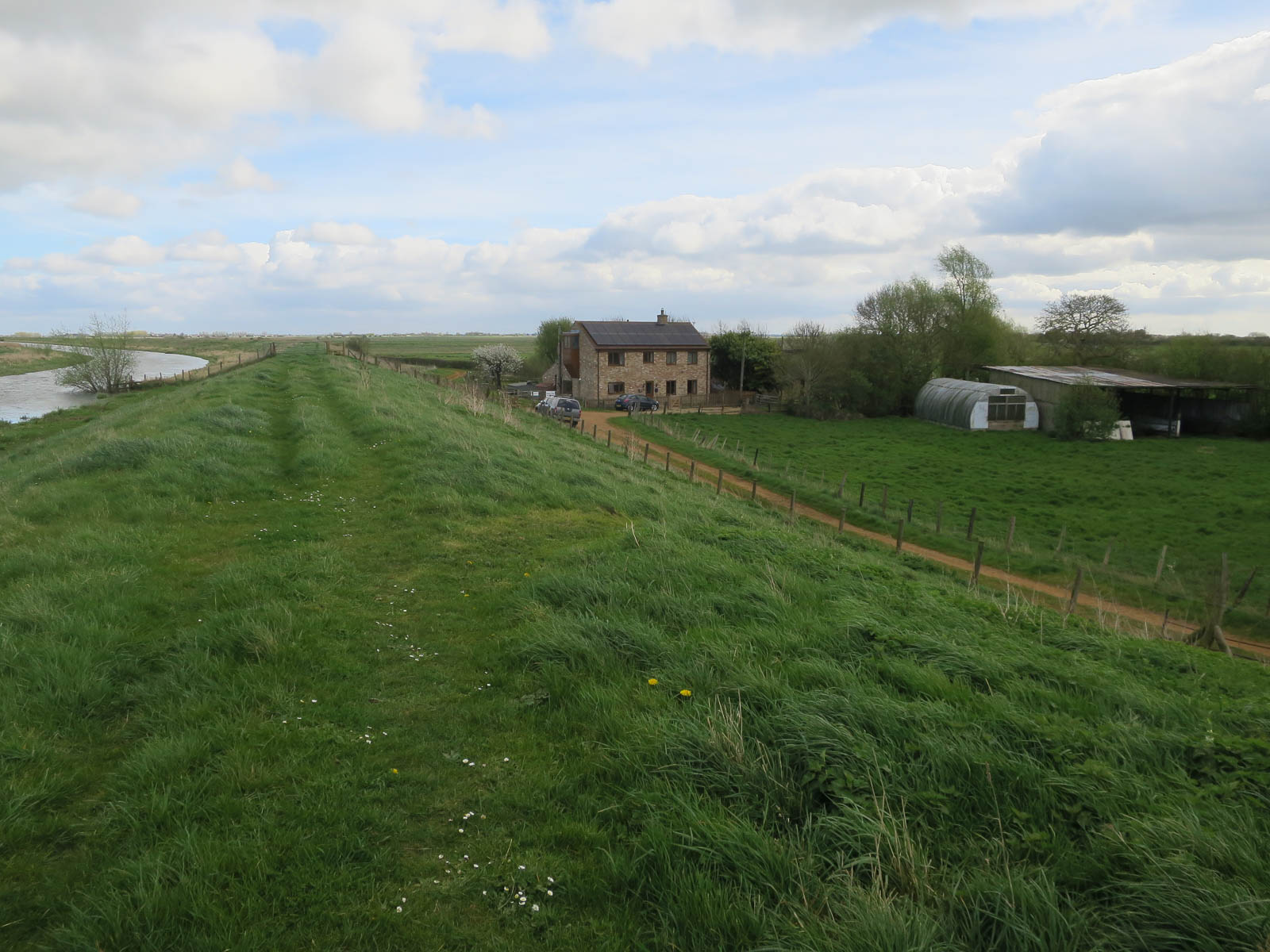
Approximate findspot of the helmet, alongside the New Bedford River

The helmet was discovered, perhaps in the 1870s, during peat digging in Witcham Gravel. The exact place where it was found is unclear; an 1877 report in the Proceedings of the Society of Antiquaries of London stated that it had been found "at a depth of about four feet [1.2 m] in digging turf, in the parish of Witcham, Cambridgeshire". Witcham Gravel was at the time a parish of about 389 acres (157 ha), a substantial amount of which was covered by fens.

By 1877, the helmet was in the possession of Thomas Maylin Vipan, who at various times served as the alderman of the Isle of Ely County Council and the Sheriff of Cambridgeshire and Huntingdonshire. On 17 May, it was exhibited to the Society of Antiquaries by its director, Augustus Wollaston Franks. The Proceedings state that he "promised a more extended communication on a future occasion", although this never came to pass.

From 3 to 16 June 1880, Vipan loaned the helmet to the Royal Archaeological Institute, which exhibited it in a two-week-long "Exhibition of Helmets and Mail". Franks, the exhibition catalogue stated, "is inclined to think that this helmet belonged to some mercenary in the Roman pay towards the end of the Roman occupation of Britain". Reporting on the exhibition, The Antiquary suggested that the helmet was one of "the most interesting" helmets on display, while The Academy termed it "a Roman helmet of great interest", and suggested that the unusual design had been made in Italy.

=== Display ===
Thomas Vipan died on 23 August 1891. That November, the British Museum bought the helmet from the Rollin & Feuardent auction house, who sold it on instructions from Vipan's estate. The helmet has remained in the museum's collection since then.

In 1993, the helmet was displayed at the Abbaye de Daoloas (fr) by Quimper in France, where it was part of the exhibition "Rome face aux Barbes" from 18 June to 26 September. The helmet was part of a British Museum exhibition—"Nero: The Man Behind the Myth"—from 27 May to 24 October 2021. The following year, from 22 January to 26 June 2022, it was displayed at the Ely Museum in Ely, Cambridgeshire, for the exhibition "Margins of Empire: Romans in the Fens".

== Typology ==
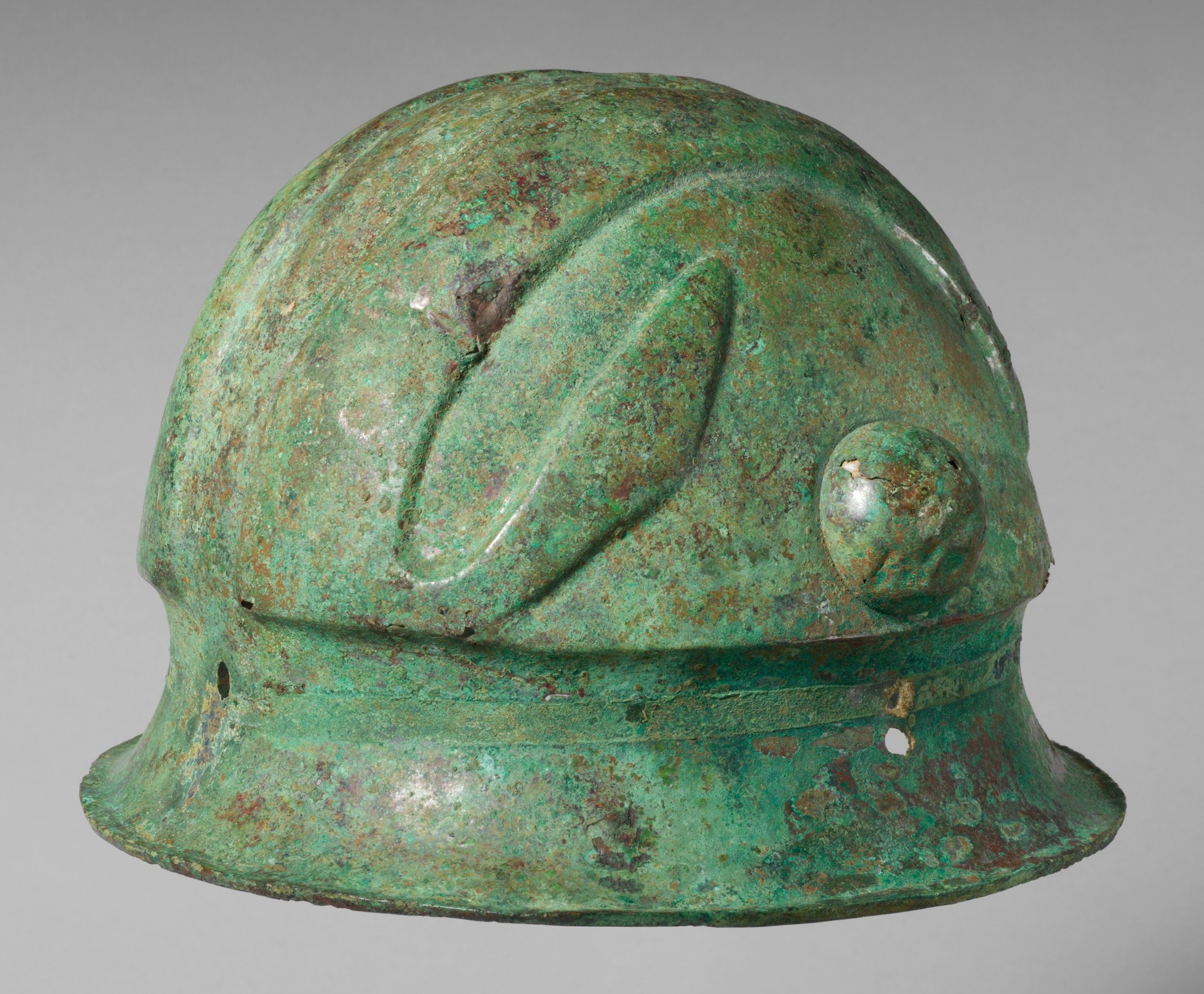
The bosses on the Witcham Gravel helmet recall similar features on Etruscan helmets from around the sixth century BC.

The helmet was likely produced around the third quarter of the first century AD, based on the size and steep angle of the neck guard. It is broadly classified as an auxiliary cavalry helmet—type B, according to the typology put forward by H. Russell Robinson. It is the sole surviving example of type B helmets; though similar to type A helmets, which are hemispherical, with recesses for the ears and small neck-flanges extending from the occiput, it has a larger, sloping neck guard.

Although the bosses on the helmet have no known Roman parallel, their origin may trace to Etruscan helmets from around the sixth century BC. Examples from near the Picenum region of the Adriatic coast—and now found in the Metropolitan Museum of Art, the University of Pennsylvania Museum of Archaeology and Anthropology, and the British Museum—have similar bosses. These examples are filled with lead, which would have helped deflect blades; the bosses on the Witcham Gravel helmet are hollow, by contrast, suggesting a decorative function.

== Bibliography ==
- "Antiquarian News". The Antiquary: A Magazine Devoted to the Study of the Past. II. London: Elliot Stock: 77–84. August 1880.
- "British Museum Objects on Display at Ely Museum". Ely Museum. 14 March 2022.
- "Bronze helmet". The Metropolitan Museum of Art.
- "Catalogue of the Exhibition of Ancient Helmets and Examples of Mail" (PDF). The Archaeological Journal. XXXVII. Royal Archaeological Institute: 455–594. 1880.
- Cook, Edward T. (1903). A Popular Handbook to the Greek and Roman Antiquities in the British Museum. London: Macmillan.
- "Exhibitions". The Academy. XVII: 444. January–June 1880.
- "helmet". The British Museum Collection Online. The British Museum.
- "helmet". The British Museum Collection Online. The British Museum.
- "Helmet". The Penn Museum.
- Kaminski, Jaime & Sim, David (2014). "The production and deposition of the Witcham Gravel Helmet" (PDF). Proceedings of the Cambridge Antiquarian Society. CIII. Cambridge Antiquarian Society: 69–82. doi:10.5284/1073475
- "Margins of Empire: Romans in the Fens". Ely Museum. 13 April 2022. Archived from the original on 27 May 2022.
- "Nero: The Man Behind the Myth". The British Museum.
- Opper, Thorsten (2021). Nero: The Man Behind the Myth. London: The British Museum Press. ISBN 978-0-7141-2290-8.
- Robinson, H. Russell (1975). The Armour of Imperial Rome. New York: Charles Scribner's Sons. ISBN 978-0-684-13956-2.
- "Society of Antiquaries". Science. The Athenæum (2587): 673. 26 May 1877.
- "Sutton.—Death of Mr. T. M. Vipan". Isle of Ely Herald. Cambridge Chronicle and University Journal, Isle of Ely Herald, and Huntingdonshire Gazette. No. 6, 728. Cambridge. 28 August 1891. p. 6 – via Newspapers.com.
- "Thursday, May 17th, 1877". Proceedings of the Society of Antiquaries of London. 2nd series. VII. Society of Antiquaries: 225–235. 1877.
