= Witcham =

Village in Cambridgeshire, England

Coordinates: 52.399°N 0.150°E

- Location within Cambridgeshire
- Population: 429 (2011)
- OS grid reference: TL463800
- Shire county: Cambridgeshire
- Region: East
- Country: England
- Sovereign state: United Kingdom
- Post town: ELY
- Postcode district: CB6
- Dialling code: 01353
- Website: www.witcham.org.uk

Witcham is a small village near Ely in Cambridgeshire, England.

The name of the village derives from "Wycham", meaning "place of the wych elms", after the trees that used to grow there in significant numbers. A Roman cavalry helmet dating from the first century AD, known as the Witcham Gravel helmet, was found in the village gravel pit, and now resides in the British Museum.

The village is surrounded by fenland farms and has a village hall and a 13th-century church dedicated to St Martin. It also has a fine village green.

Witcham is built around a cross-roads in the centre of the village with each of the four roads having housing on each side for 50-200m. The north-bound street is called "Martins Lane", the east-bound street is "High Street", south-bound is "The Slade", and west-bound is "Silver Street", which leads to the more recent housing developments of "Westway Place" and "The Orchards".

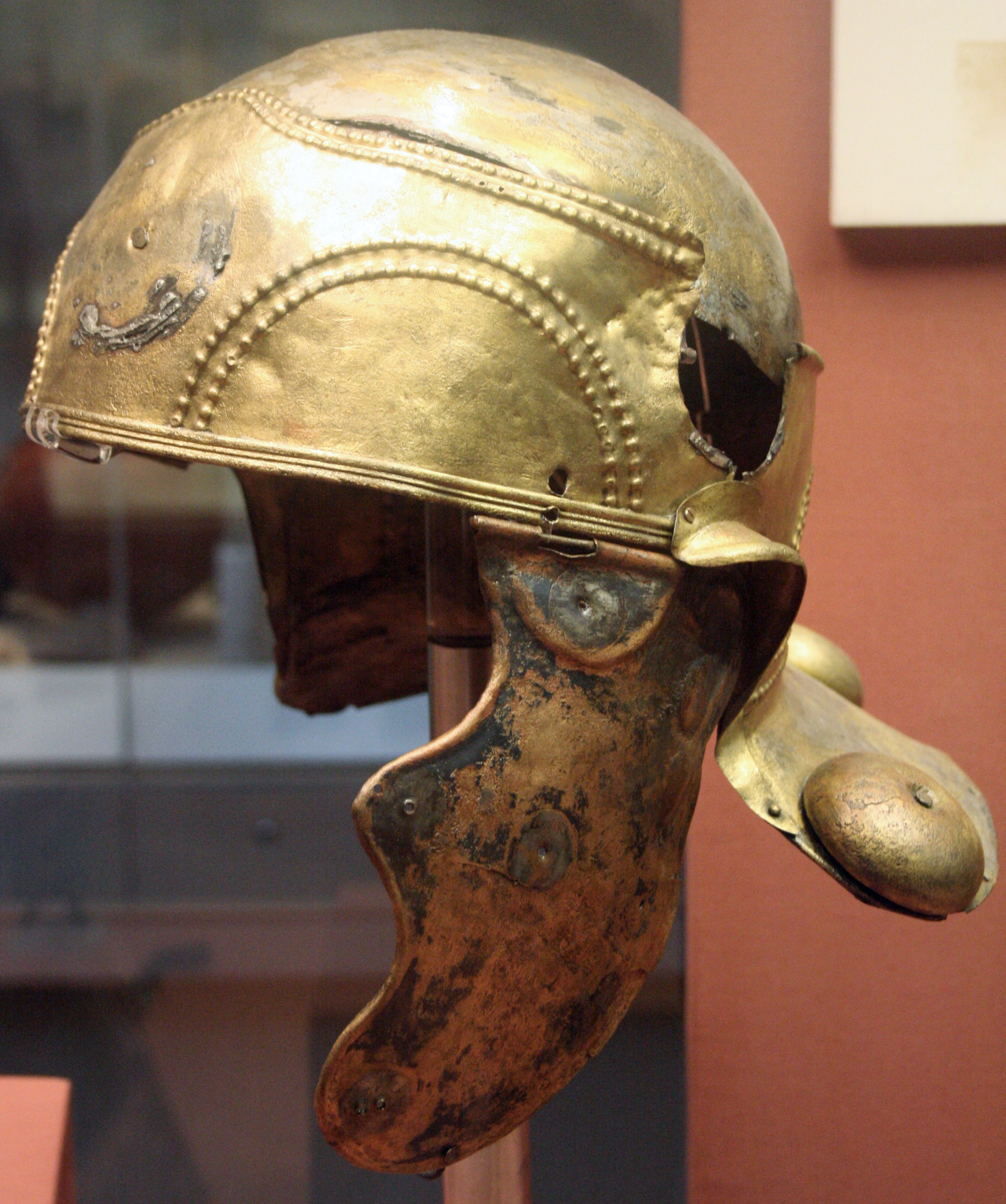
The Witcham Gravel helmet in the British Museum

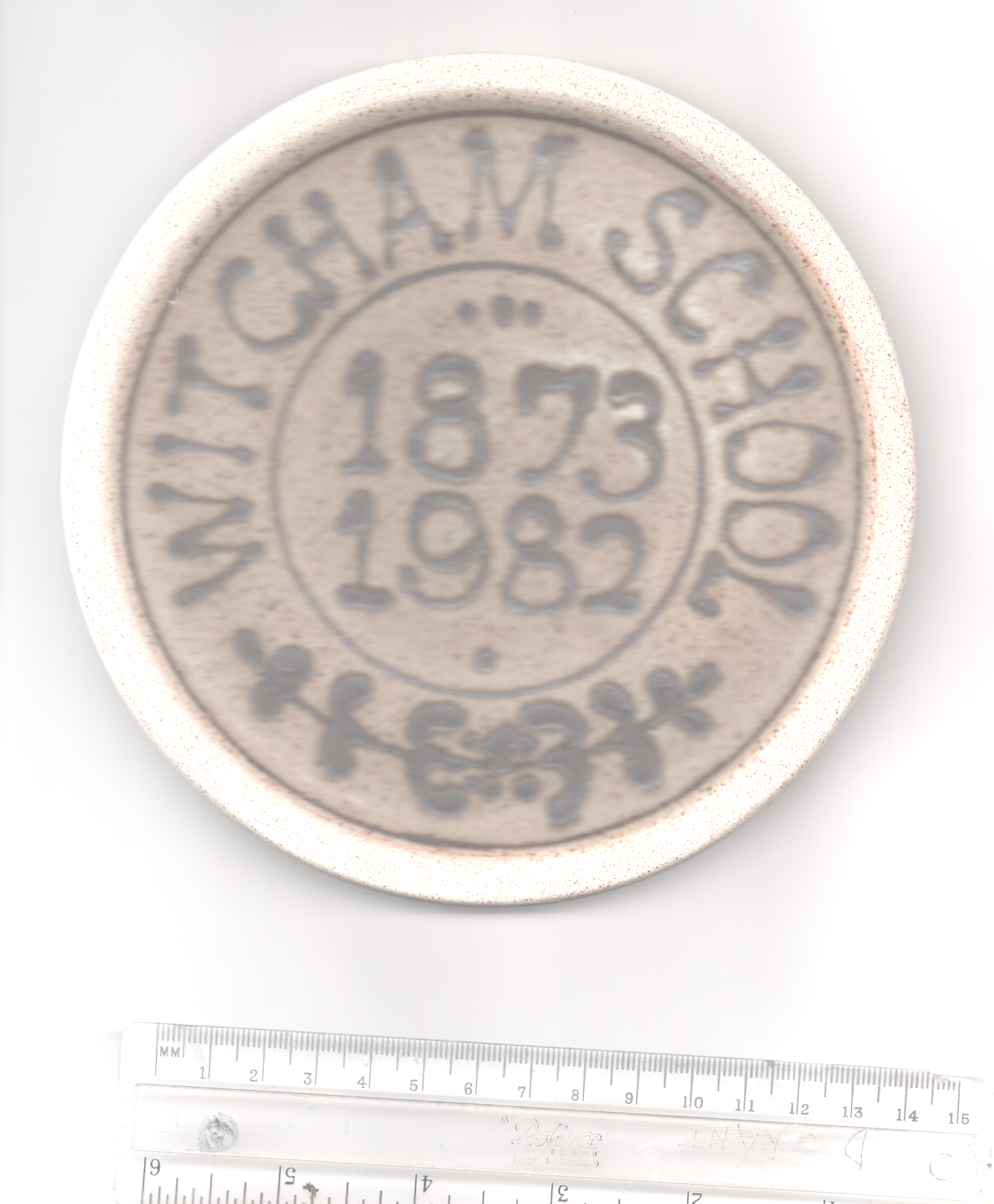
Commemoration Plate for the closure of Witcham School

The village school was sited on the South side of High Street, opposite and a little East of St.Martin's church, and was open as an infants and junior school from 1873 until 1982. When the school closed the pupils instead went to Mepal or Sutton. A local archive has further images of the school.

The village hosts the World Pea Shooting Championships on the second Saturday in July every year and has staged the competition annually since 1971.

== Witcham Gravel ==
Historically, Witcham Parish had several detached portions in the outlying Fens. By 1896, boundary changes had reduced these detached portions to one, separated from the main by a small parish called Witcham Gravel. Witcham Gravel was placed in Ely Urban District, whereas the two parts of Witcham proper were included in Ely Rural District. This situation persisted until 1933, when Witcham Gravel parish was merged into Witcham.
