= Wisbech Canal =

Broad beam canal near Wisbech Cambridgeshire

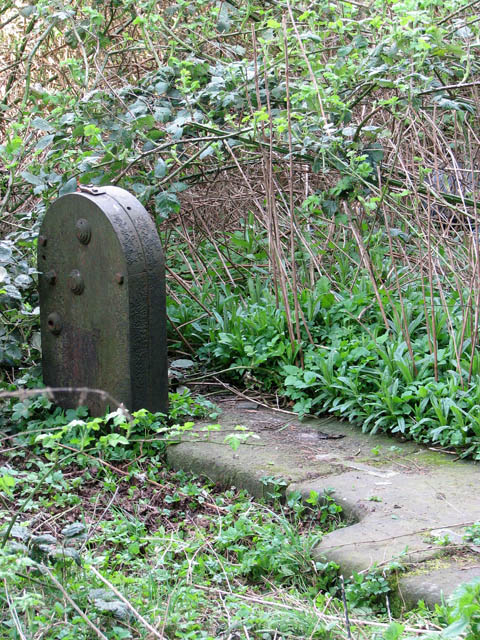
- The remains of paddle gear and some stonework from Outwell flood lock

Specifications
- Locks: 2
- Status: Infilled

History
- Original owner: Wisbech Canal Company
- Date of act: 1794
- Date closed: 1926

Geography
- Start point: Wisbech
- End point: Outwell
- Connects to: River Nene, Middle Level Navigations

The Wisbech Canal was a broad canal from Wisbech, Isle of Ely in the Fenland area of Cambridgeshire, England. It ran from the River Nene at Wisbech to the Well Creek at Outwell now in Norfolk, which gave access to the River Great Ouse. It was abandoned in 1926 and filled in during the 1970s.

== History ==
The canal was planned as a means to improve the status of Wisbech as a trading centre. Following correspondence between the Hon and Revd Charles Lindsay, who later became chairman of the company, and Lord Hardwicke, on the potential benefits of the scheme, an engineer called John Watte was asked to undertake a survey and make a plan including the estimated costs of opening up the old river to create the Wisbech and Well Navigation. These were to be presented at a public meeting on 30 October 1792, at the Rose and Crown Inn, Wisbech. However, the meeting was swamped by speculators and traders from places as far away as Derby, Leicester, Uppingham, Huntingdon and Bedford and some difficulty was experienced in maintaining control, but the local people succeeded in doing so, although the initial committee consisted of equal numbers of "strangers and people at home".

The meeting Resolved:

That the Restoration of the ancient Navigation between Wisbech and Outwell will be of great public utility.

That the Object of this Plan is not intended in opposition to, or in any shape to interfere with, the plan of Drainage and Navigation proposed by the cut intended to be made from Eau Brink to Lynn.

That an application be made to the Honourable Corporation of Bedford Level, requesting their Permission to open the said River between Wisbech and Outwell, and to erect such Works as may be necessary for carrying the proposed Plan; into execution.

That a committee be appointed for making the application to the Bedford Level Corporation proposed by the last Resolution, and that the said Committee do take such Measures as may be thought expedient for promoting and carrying the said plan into effect, and that they do call a public meeting as soon as the answer of the Bedford Level Corporation can be obtained.

That Application be made by the Committee to the Lord Bishop of Ely, as Lord of the Franchise, for his concurrence in and approbation of the plan.

That the Honourable and Reverend Charles Lindsay, John Heigham, Esq, John Hollis Pigot and Oglethorp Wainman, Doctors of Physick, Messrs William Rayner, James Bentley, Robert Hardwick, John Parker, Jonathan Peckover, Thomas Whieldon, Joseph Howell, Francis Agard, Thomas Barker, Henry Haynes, Paul Webster, John Edes and Smith Mitton, or any five of them, be the Committee for the above Purposes; and that they do meet at such times and places as shall be thought necessary on proper notice given to them by the solicitors for that purpose.

That Mr Jonathan Peckover, Banker in Wisbech, be appointed Treasurer for receiving the monies to be subscribed for carrying this plan into execution.

That Messrs Fawssett and Bellamy of Wisbech be appointed solicitors for conducting the further proceedings in this business.

The committee called a meeting at the Rose and Crown Inn, in Wisbech, on Friday 19 July 1793, to report back and progress the scheme.

Wisbech Canal Act 1794
- Act of Parliament
- Parliament of Great Britain
- Long title: An act for making and maintaining a navigable canal from Wisbeach river, at or near a place called the Old Sluice, in the town of Wisbeach, in the isle of Ely, and county of Cambridge, to join the river Nene, in the parish of Outwell, in the said isle of Ely, and in the county of Norfolk, and for improving and maintaining the navigation of the said river, from Outwell Church to Salter's Load Sluice.
- Citation: 34 Geo. 3. c. 92
- Territorial extent: Great Britain

Dates
- Royal assent: 9 May 1794
- Commencement: 9 May 1794 (Note: The Acts of Parliament (Commencement) Act 1793.)
Other legislation
Amended by	Wisbech Corporation Act 1944; Middle Level Act 2018

Status: Amended

Text of statute as originally enacted

A petition was presented to Parliament on behalf of the burgesses of Wisbech in early 1794, and the canal was authorised by an act of Parliament, the Wisbech Canal Act 1794 (34 Geo. 3. c. 92), which was granted on 9 May 1794.

A notice published in the press states that the locks at either end would be of a similar length; nonetheless this appears not to have been the case once constructed.

WISBECH CANAL. THE Committee of the WISBECH CANAL COMPANY give NOTICE, That they propose, during the present Summer, to erect Two LOCKS or PEN SLUICES the One at the North End of the intended Canal, adjoining Wisbech River, to be set on a regular Floor Timber, with Dove-tail Piles, and other Drift Work, to be built with Brick, and to be about One Hundred Feet in length, Fourteen Feet Water-way, and about Fourteen Feet below Soil, with double Gates or Pointing Doors of Oak at each End, and a Carriage Bridge of Timber over the same: and the other Lock or Sluice at the South End of the said intended Canal near Outwell, to be built with Timber, of nearly the Dimensions before mentioned, with like Pointing Doors and Carriage Bridge.— The Plans and Sections of the Locks may seen at the Office of Messrs FAWSSETT and BELLAMY, in Wisbech, the 12th July next; and Notice will be given of the Time and Place for receiving Proposals, and contracting for the said Works, which are to be begun and completed without Delay. JAs. BELLAMY, Clerk to the Wisbech Canal Company. All Letters (Post paid) will be answered. WISBECH, 24th June, 1794.

— Stamford Mercury

This act formed The Wisbech Canal Company, which had powers to raise £14,000, with an option to raise an additional £6,000 if required. This was to be used to construct the canal which ran from a junction with the River Nene at Wisbech, to a junction with the Well Creek and the Old River Nene at Outwell. The Well Creek connects to the Great Ouse. In addition, the company had powers to maintain and improve the river from Outwell Church to Salter's Lode Sluice on the Old River Nene. All traffic passing between the canal and the Nene River was required to pay a toll, which was to be used to maintain the Well Creek.

A call for a further £10 per share was made in May 1795 and again in September 1795. On 21 December 1795 it was announced in the press "THAT the Wisbech Canal will be opened on first day of January next for the navigating of merchandize and other goods conveyed from the Port of Wisbech"

The towing path was to be fenced off from the canal with post and rails.

Because of the low level of the Fens landscape, the canal was constructed on embankments for most of its 5.25 mile (8.4 km) length, and was opened in 1797. Flood locks were constructed at both ends of the canal. The one at Outwell was 97 feet (30 m) long, but the one at Wisbech was only 50 feet (15 m), and so longer boats wishing to enter or leave the canal at the Wisbech end had to wait for the levels in the river and the canal to equalise, at which point both sets of gates could be opened. The canal did not have its own water supply, but was refilled when the water level in the Nene at Wisbech was high enough. This was normally only at spring tides, and so the water level often ran low in the period before the next spring tide was due.

In 1834 a storm caused a high tide which damaged the new sluice and the swollen waters overflowed the banks of the canal causing considerable flooding between Wisbech and Outwell.

In 1883, the Wisbech and Upwell Tramway opened, running from Wisbech to Outwell and following a route along the course of the canal. It was extended to Upwell in 1884. Initially, there was some benefit to the canal, as coal was transported by the railway to Outwell, and loaded into boats by chutes: ultimately the railways steadily took the trade.

The canal became a popular place to skate, the nearby pubs often arranging matches and prizes. In 1890 Pogson, the Wisbech sluice keeper, was accused of having deliberately broken up the ice by letting in water, he was chased to the keeper's cottage and a crowd assembled and smashed the windows.

The Wisbech Canal Bill, which provided for the closing and sale of the canal and for the dissolution of the company was sent for first reading in the House of Commons in 1903.

The bill was reported as being withdrawn in March.

A poaching case prosecution in 1907 revealed that the Sheffield Anglers Association had held the fishing rights for 15 years. In 1910 the Sheffield Amalgamated Angling Society acquired the fishing rights.

In 1914, the tolls collected only amounted to £56. All traffic ceased in 1922, and the canal was formally abandoned on 14 June 1926, when a warrant for its closure was obtained from the Minister of Transport.

There were frequent drownings in the canal and nearby River Nene. John Gordon was just one of many people to rescue a child from a watery grave.

The canal remained in a derelict state until the early 1960s, when the Wisbech end was filled in to allow the A1101 Churchill Road link to be built without destroying the historic town centre. Much of the rest of the canal was used as a landfill site, and consequently any development within 270 yd (250m) of the former line of the canal requires special consent from Cambridgeshire County Council's Waste Management Services department.

== Points of interest ==
Point	Coordinates (Links to map resources)	OS Grid Ref	Notes
Wisbech lock	52.6670°N 0.1620°E	TF462098	
Walsoken Bridge	52.6645°N 0.1659°E	TF465096	
Elm Road Railway Bridge	52.6579°N 0.1675°E	TF466088	
New Common Bridge	52.6547°N 0.1690°E	TF468085	A1101 built over bed
Elm Bridge	52.6444°N 0.1761°E	TF473074	
Collets Bridge	52.6349°N 0.1910°E	TF483063	
Boyces Bridge	52.6257°N 0.2123°E	TF498054	
Outwell Basin	52.6190°N 0.2233°E	TF506046	
Scotts Bridge	52.6176°N 0.2302°E	TF510045	
Outwell lock	52.6111°N 0.2332°E	TF513038	Jn with Well Creek

== See also ==
- Canals of Great Britain
- History of the British canal system

== Bibliography ==
- Boyes, J; Russell, R (1977). The Canals of Eastern England. David and Charles. ISBN 978-0-7153-7415-3.
- Cumberlidge, Jane (1998). Inland Waterways of Great Britain (7th Ed.). Imray Laurie Norie and Wilson. ISBN 978-0-85288-355-6.
- Priestley, Joseph (1831). Historical Account of the Navigable Rivers, Canals and Railways of Great Britain. Archived from the original on 12 March 2016.
- Russell, Ronald (1971). Lost Canals of England and Wales. David and Charles. ISBN 978-0-7153-5417-9.
- Smith, William P (2014). Pictorial Journey Down The Wisbech Canal. Carrilson Publications. ISBN 978-0-9543997-3-3.
- Smith, William P (2021). The Ancient Town of Wella. Carrillson Publications. ISBN 978-09543997-6-4.
