= Middle Level Navigations =

Waterway network in eastern England

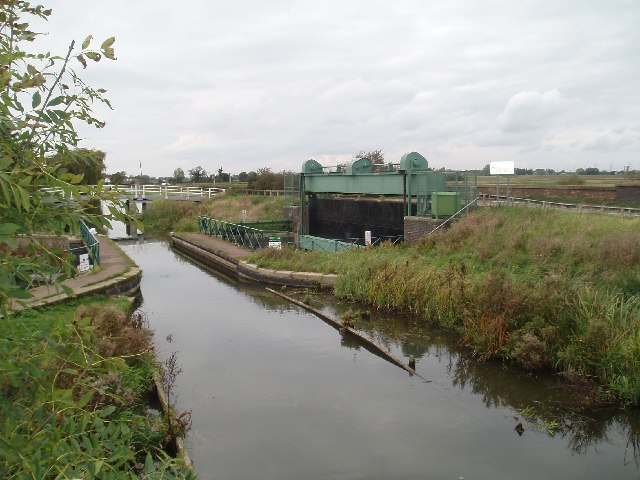
- The Mullicourt aqueduct where the Well Creek crosses the main drain
- Interactive map of Middle Level Navigations

Specifications
- Maximum boat length: 80 ft 0 in (24.38 m)
- Maximum boat beam: 11 ft 0 in (3.35 m)
- Locks: 6
- Status: Navigable
- Navigation authority: Middle Level Commissioners

History
- Original owner: Bedford Level Commissioners

Geography
- Start point: Peterborough
- End point: Salters Lode
- Connects to: River Nene, River Great Ouse

The Middle Level Navigations are a network of waterways in England, primarily used for land drainage, which lie in The Fens between the Rivers Nene and Great Ouse, and between the cities of Peterborough and Cambridge. Most of the area through which they run is at or below sea level, and attempts to protect it from inundation have been carried out since 1480. The Middle Level was given its name by the Dutch Engineer Cornelius Vermuyden in 1642, who subsequently constructed several drainage channels to make the area suitable for agriculture. Water levels were always managed to allow navigation, and Commissioners were established in 1754 to maintain the waterways and collect tolls from commercial traffic.

The Middle Level Main Drain to Wiggenhall St Germans was completed in 1848, which provided better drainage because the outfall was lower than that at Salters Lode. Whittlesey Mere, the last remaining lake, was drained soon afterwards, using one of the first applications of John Appold's centrifugal pump, following its appearance at the Great Exhibition in 1851. Traffic on the network began to diminish after the opening of the railway through March in 1846, and fell dramatically in the early twentieth century. The last regular commercial traffic was the tanker barge Shellfen, which delivered fuel oil to pumping stations until 1971.

As a result of the drainage, land levels continued to fall, and in 1934 the gravity outfall at Wiggenhall St Germans was replaced by a pumping station, with three diesel engines driving 8 ft 6 in (2.6 m) diameter pumps. Its capacity was increased in 1951, and again in 1969–70, when two of the engines were replaced by electric motors. Following over 50 hours of continuous running at maximum capacity in 1998, a new pumping station was commissioned. Work on it began in 2006, and when it was completed in 2010, it was the second largest pumping station in Europe. Much of the drainage of the Middle Levels relies on pumping, and the Commissioners manage over 100 pumping stations throughout the area.

Interest in restoration of the Middle Levels for leisure traffic began in 1949, and the first significant work by volunteers occurred in 1972, when they worked on the restoration of Well Creek, which finally reopened in 1975. Since then, locks have been lengthened, to allow access by modern narrowboats, as they were built for Fen Lighters, which were only 49 feet (15 m) long. The southern reaches became more accessible in 2006, when a low Bailey bridge was raised by soldiers from the 39 Engineer Regiment. The system is managed by Commissioners, and they are the fourth largest navigation authority in Great Britain.

== History ==
The Middle Levels of the Fens are a low-lying area of approximately 270 square miles (700 km^{2}), much of which is at or below sea level. Attempts to protect them from inundation and to make them suitable for agriculture began in 1480, when the Bishop of Ely, John Morton, constructed a 12-mile (19 km) straight cut from Stanground to Guyhirne. This provided the waters of the River Nene with a more direct route to the sea than the previous route through Benwick, Floods Ferry, March, Outwell and Wisbech. Morton's Leam, the name given to the medieval drainage ditch, was 40 feet (12 m) wide and 4 feet (1.2 m) deep, and much of the manual labour was provided by prisoners of war from the Hundred Years War. In 1605, Sir John Popham, who was the Lord Chief Justice at the time, began work on a drainage scheme near Upwell, and although the scheme was ultimately abandoned in 1608, Popham's Eau, his 5.6-mile (9.0 km) cut from the old course of the River Nene near March to the Well Creek at Nordelph remains.

=== Establishment ===
The next significant advance was in 1630, when the Dutch Engineer Cornelius Vermuyden was employed by the Earl of Bedford and others to drain the Fens. The Old Bedford River was cut from Earith to Salters Lode, a distance of 21 miles (34 km), and provided sufficient drainage that the land could be used for summer grazing. Vermuyden published a document in 1642, entitled Discourse touching the draining of the Great Fennes, in which he proposed the division of the fens into three zones, the North Level, the South Level, and between them, the Middle Level, stretching from Morton's Leam to the Bedford River. An Act of Parliament, the Pretended Act, was obtained in 1649, and work began under his supervision. The New Bedford River was constructed, running parallel to the Old, and the Middle Levels area was protected. The Forty Foot, Twenty Foot and Sixteen Foot Rivers were cut soon afterwards, to drain water from the area to Salters Lode and Welches Dam. In addition to these new channels, the Middle Level also contained 26 miles (42 km) of the old course of the Nene, and the ancient artificial waterways of King's Dyke and Whittlesey Dyke, which connect Stanground to Floods Ferry. To the north is Well Creek, most of which was a natural waterway, although the final section to Salters Lode Lock follows the course of the New Podyke, a drainage channel constructed in the early sixteenth century. The primary function of the waterways was drainage, but water levels were managed to enable them to be navigated. The volumes of traffic carried are not well documented, especially in the early period.

Within the level, there were four large lakes or meres, of which the biggest was Whittlesey Mere. It was used for leisure boating, and was described by Celia Fiennes in 1697, who stated that it was 6 miles (9.7 km) long and 3 miles (4.8 km) wide, and noted that it was sometimes dangerous, since it was prone to sudden winds rising up 'like hurricanes'. In order to maintain and improve the route between Salters Lode Sluice on the Great Ouse and Stanground Sluice on the River Nene, another Act of Parliament was obtained in 1754. This created Commissioners to manage the waterways, with powers to charge 3d per ton on goods entering the system through either of the sluices. Agricultural produce was carried through Salters Lode, bound for Kings Lynn, while coal, timber and groceries moved in the opposite direction. Pleasure boats were specifically excluded from paying tolls, as were certain products including manure, compost, malt dust, pigeons' dung and some varieties of oil cake. Another account of the system is provided by George Walpole's Journal of the Voyage round the Fens in 1774, which was made in a fleet of nine boats, all of which were towed by a single horse called Hippopotamus when there was insufficient wind for sailing. Carpenters were employed to jack up or remove bridges which were too low for the boats to pass, and although the expedition lasted for 22 days, Walpole only recorded one gang of lighters, which delayed them as Salters Lode.

The system was enhanced in 1796 by the opening of the Wisbech Canal, which linked the Well Creek at Outwell to the River Nene at Wisbech. It followed the line of the Wellstream, another ancient waterway. At Outwell the Well Creek is also joined by the old course of the River Nene.

=== Development ===
A new Act of Parliament was obtained in 1810, as the 1754 Act did not make sufficient provision for the funding of drainage works, and in some cases ensured that flood relief could not be given until the land had flooded. The new Act transferred responsibility from the Bedford Level Corporation to local Commissioners, who had to be land-owners. They had powers to charge a levy on all land which could be taxed under the Eau Brink Acts. Between 1824 and 1839, John Dyson Jr was employed as the resident engineer by the Bedford Level Commissioners. He had been recommended by John Rennie, and was charged with the reconstruction of ten locks and sluices, together with "a great many other works of great importance", for which the estimated cost was between £50,000 and £60,000. The work included the rebuilding of Salters Lode sluice, which Dyson oversaw himself, as no suitable tenders were received when the work was advertised. It was completed by 1832. Sluices and bridges at Stanground, Welches Dam, and the end of the Old Bedford River, near Salters Lode, were also rebuilt.

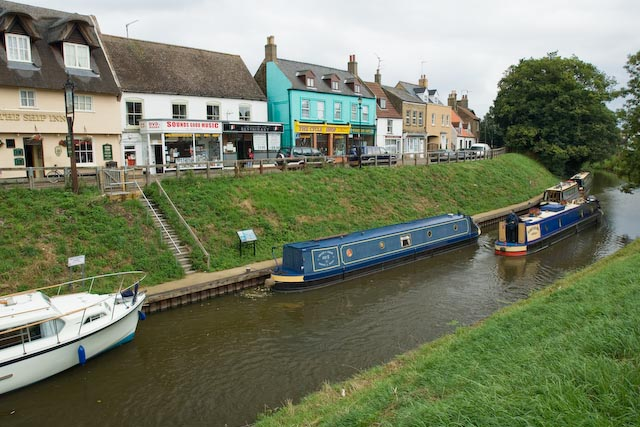
Moorings on the Old River Nene at March

As the land dried, the peaty soils shrank, causing the land surface to drop. Much of the Middle Levels was flooded in 1841–42, and this led the Commissioners to obtain an Act of Parliament in 1844, which authorised the construction of a new main drain, 11 miles (18 km) long, in order that water could flow by gravity to Wiggenhall St Germans, where the levels of the tidal river were about 7 feet (2.1 m) lower than at Salters Lode. The work was completed in 1848, and the sluice at Marmount Priory was also built at this time, in order to allow boats with a deeper draught to navigate through Upwell and Outwell. A railway line from Ely to Peterborough passed through the port of March from 1846, which soon became a railway hub, with branch lines to Wisbech and St Ives. Traffic transferred from the waterways, which made the drainage responsibilities of the Commissioners easier. The new main drain enabled Whittlesey Mere to be drained. A pumping station with an Appold centrifugal pump was used to achieve this, rather than the more traditional scoop wheel. The pump had been shown for the first time at the Great Exhibition in 1851, where it amazed visitors, and its inventor was commissioned to design a pump for the draining of the mere. It was 4 feet 6 inches (1.4 m) in diameter, and powered by a 25 hp (19 kW) steam engine, could raise 101 tons of water per minute by two to three feet (0.6–0.9 m). In 1862 an Act of Parliament created the Middle Level Commissioners as a separate body to the Bedford Level Corporation, although they had been almost independent since 1810, and they embarked on a series of improvements. Drainage was always the primary function, but navigation was also important, and the new body had powers to charge tolls for the use of the waterways.

1862 was also the year in which the Wiggenhall sluice collapsed and around 9 square miles (23 km^{2}) of the levels were flooded. Sir John Hawkshaw constructed a new sluice, consisting of a large cofferdam, with 16 tubes, each 3 feet 6 inches (1.1 m) in diameter, which passed over the top of it. The tops of these pipes were 20 feet (6.1 m) above the inlet and outlet, and an air pump was used to remove the air from them, so that the water would syphon over the cofferdam. It was the only time that such a solution was tried in the Fens, and it was supplemented in 1880 by a more conventional gravity sluice, also constructed by Hawkshaw, as it was unable to discharge sufficient water.

Some commercial traffic on the waterways continued despite the railway competition, with 44,034 tons generating £733 of tolls in 1888, which enabled the Commissioners to show a profit of £216. Traffic had fallen slightly to 42,640 tons in 1898, but by 1905 was down to 12,770 tons, and the Commissioners showed a loss of £702 that year. An Alderman giving evidence to the Royal Commission on Canals and Waterways in 1905 pointed out that one of the railway companies had been paying to collect traffic in hay and straw, although this practice ceased when it became public knowledge. The condition of the Nene and the Wisbech Canal declined, which discouraged navigation, but some trade in agricultural produce, coal, bricks and road building materials continued. Coal was delivered by barge from Outwell Depot to around 40 pumping stations.

There were a few regular carriers left by the 1920s, one of whom ran Jackson's Navy, using horses to tow the barges, and steam tugs after 1930. When the company stopped trading in 1948, sugar beet traffic was carried to Ely in boats owned by the beet factory for another ten years. Fuel oil for the pumping stations was supplied by the tanker barge Shellfen until 1971, by which time the Well Creek was almost impassible.

=== Pumping stations ===
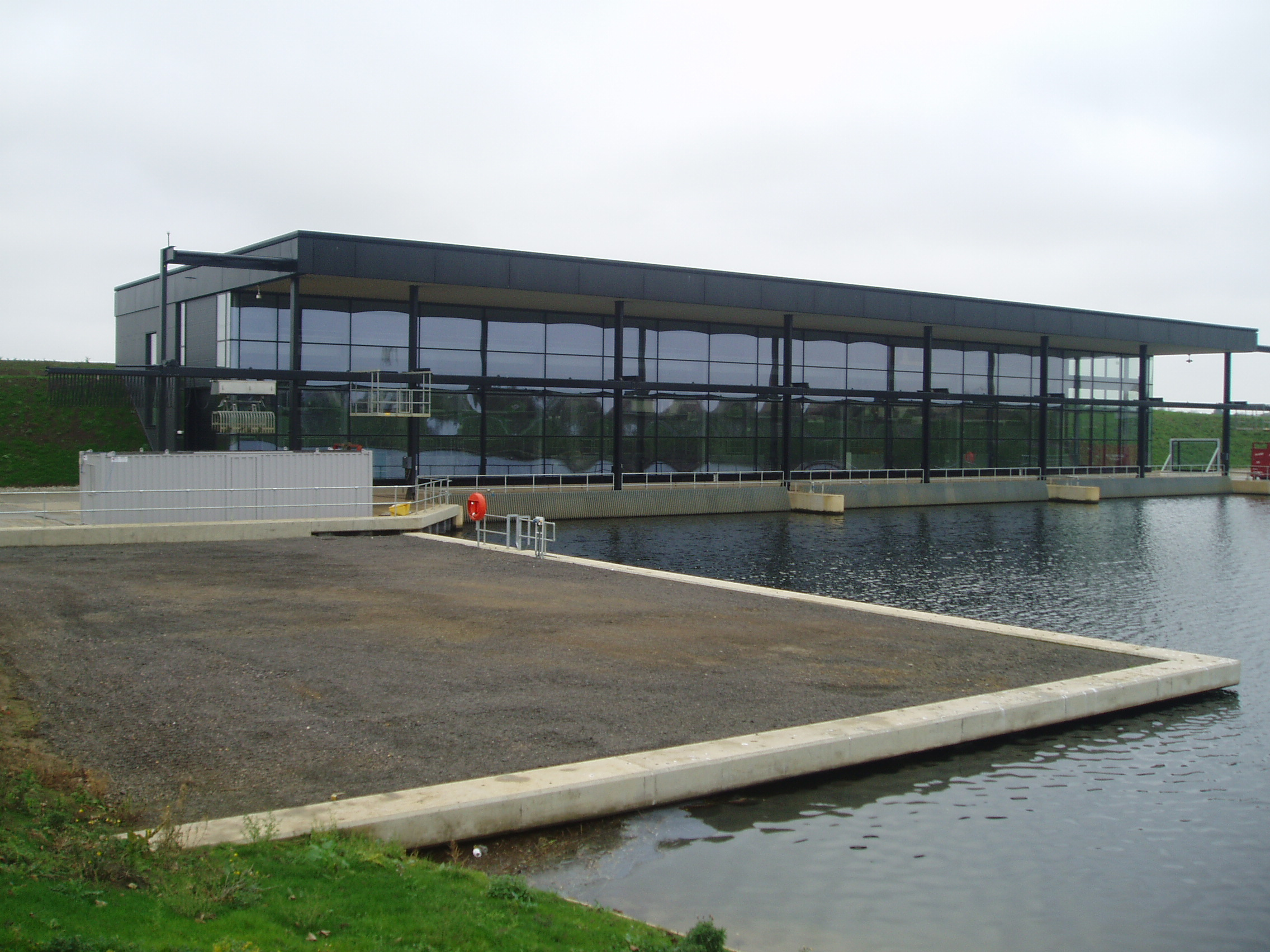
The new pumping station at Wiggenhall St Germans pumps the Middle Levels main drain. It was commissioned in 2010, and the pumps are visible through the glass wall that forms the front of the building.

The effect of drainage on the light peaty soils was that further shrinkage occurred, and land levels continued to fall. By the late 1920s, gravity discharge alone could no longer be relied upon to provide an adequate level of flood protection, and a change to pumped drainage began. A new sluice and pumping station were constructed at St Germans, which was completed in 1934. The sluice was built in the centre of the old syphon sluice channel, with a pumping station on either side of it. Three pump sets were installed, with space for a fourth. Each consisted of a 1,000 bhp (750 kW) Crossley diesel engine coupled to an 8 ft 6 in (2.6 m) Gwynnes pump, which could pump 840 tons per minute, or 1,234 megalitres per day (Ml/d). Once completed, the syphon sluice was demolished, while Hawkshaw's replacement sluice and its channel were abandoned. The new works were paid for by a grant, given on condition that three quarters of the workforce were from the local area. The capacity of the station was increased in 1951, when a 1,200 bhp (890 kW) Crossley diesel engine was fitted into the spare bay, and again in 1969–70, when the two pumps on the north side of the sluice were rebuilt, and the engines replaced by 1,500 bhp (1,100 kW) electric motors.

From 1977 to 1983, a series of improvements were carried out, which included the construction of a pumping station at Tebbits Bridge on Bevills Leam, preventing navigation along this channel to the southern reaches of the Middle Levels. A new lock was constructed at Lodes End to provide an alternative route. The banks of the Old River Nene were raised and clay puddling was used to retain the water, and major improvements to the Forty Foot, Twenty Foot and Sixteen Foot rivers were made, to maintain water levels for navigation. All of the bridges on the Sixteen Foot River were demolished and replaced to provide wider channels, as their width restricted flows during heavy rainfall, and St Germans pumping station was again upgraded, when the remaining 1934 engine was replaced by a 1,550 bhp (1,160 kW) Allen diesel engine. The improvements have restricted navigation in the lower south-western area, but greatly improved flood defences.

The Tebbitt's Bridge pumping station houses six Allen 3-foot-3-inch (0.99 m) diameter pumps, each capable of pumping 260 Ml/d. Three of them are powered by 225 bhp (168 kW) electric induction motors, manufactured by Lawrence Scott, which are controlled automatically, while the other three are powered by Dorman 274 bhp (204 kW) diesel engines, which are controlled manually. There is a standby generator, to cope with loss of the electric supply, and when all six pumps are operational, the station can pump 1,586 Ml/d, equivalent to 18 tonnes per second.

In April 1998, the St Germans pumping station ran at maximum capacity, which was 6,134 Ml/d (or 71 tonnes per second), for over 50 hours, and this led to the decision to replace it with a brand new installation, with 40% extra capacity. Work started in December 2006, and the pumping station, which is the second largest in Europe, includes a glass wall to enable visitors to see the pumps. The new station was commissioned on 22 April 2010, after which the old station was demolished. A formal opening ceremony was held on 20 April 2011, when the station was opened by Lord James Russell, brother of the Duke of Bedford, and a descendant of the Earl of Bedford who started the process of draining the Fens in the seventeenth century. There are more than one hundred smaller pumping stations scattered throughout the system to maintain the water levels and prevent flooding.

=== Restoration ===
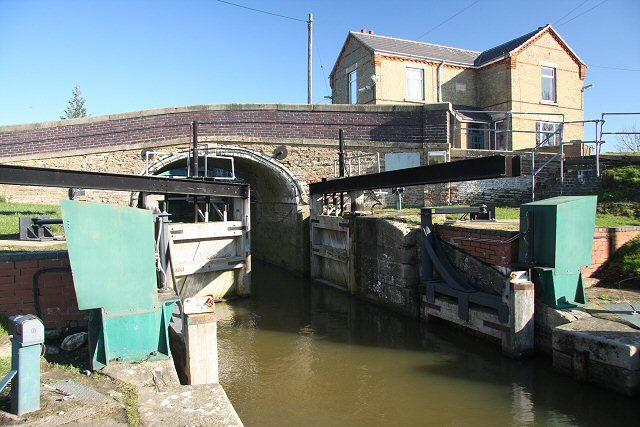
Salters Lode Lock, at the end of Well Creek, showing the two sets of gates pointing in opposite directions

Local interest in restoring the Middle Levels for navigation began to develop in 1949. The Fenlands Branch of the Inland Waterways Association was formed on 30 October 1949, and following assurances from the Ouse Catchment Board that they were planning to restore the river for navigation up to Bedford, the branch decided to devote their energies to the Middle Levels, which were weedy and heavily silted. Salters Lode lock was rebuilt in 1963, but passage along Well Creek was very difficult. The East Anglian Waterways Association and the Middle Level Watermans Club began campaigning for it to be dredged in 1964. The first major working party by volunteers on the system occurred in 1972, when the Well Creek Trust organised a project called 'Fenatic' in October, which involved draining the creek so that it could be cleared of rubbish. It was reopened for traffic in 1975.

When the navigations were built, the boats using them were traditional Fen Lighters, which were 46 by 11 feet (14.0 by 3.4 m), and the locks were sized accordingly. However, there has been a programme to increase the lock sizes to make the waterways accessible to standard narrow boats. Lodes End lock was 65 feet (20 m) when built. The lock at Marmount Priory was extended to 92 feet (28 m), Ashline lock to 90 feet (27 m), Stanground to 80 feet (24 m), and Horseway to 60 feet (18 m). with the new Ashline lock being reopened on 1 April 1999. Salter's Lode lock has three sets of gates, with a guillotine gate at the tidal end, and mitre gates which allow boats up to 62 feet (19 m) long to enter the River Ouse when the river level is higher than the level of Well Creek. It was possible for longer boats to pass straight through at certain states of the tide, but the lock has been lengthened to 80 feet (24 m), by the addition of a third set of mitre gates, facing away from the river, which can only be used when the level of the river is lower than that of the Creek. Welches Dam Lock is still sized for Fen Lighters, at just 47 feet (14 m) long.

Access to the southern reaches of the Levels was improved in 2006, when soldiers from the 53rd Field Squadron of the 39 Engineer Regiment raised the level of a Bailey bridge at Ramsey Hollow. This had previously restricted passage, as it was very low, but the exercise increased the headroom by 3 ft (0.9 m). The Inland Waterways Association raised the funding for the additional materials required, and the reconstruction opened up a 33-mile (53 km) cruising ring on the Levels.

== Today ==
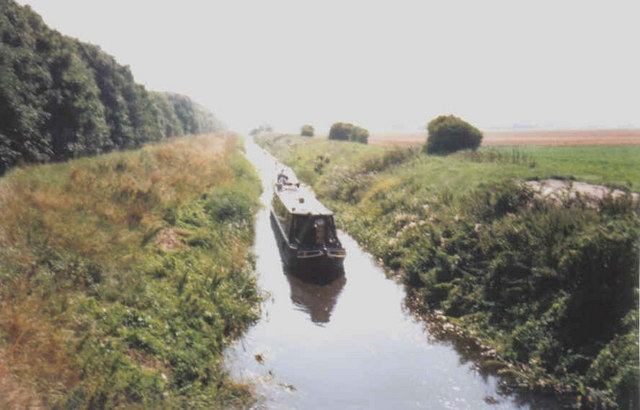
Passage on the Middle Level Navigations can be difficult. This was on Vermuyden's Drain between Horseway Lock and Welches Dam Lock in 1997. The channel is now overgrown with reeds.

The navigations are managed by the Middle Level Commissioners, who are responsible for about 120 miles (190 km) of waterway, of which around 100 miles (160 km) are navigable. The Commissioners are also responsible for six locks and a number of pumping stations, and are the fourth largest navigation authority in Great Britain.

The navigations often form a short cut for boaters between the River Nene at Peterborough and the River Great Ouse at Salters Lode Lock. The suggested route passes through Stanground Sluice, along King's Dyke to Ashline Lock, and then along Whittlesey Dike to Flood's Ferry junction. From here the route is along the old course of the River Nene, passing through the twin villages of Outwell and Upwell, where the abandoned Wisbech Canal once formed a route back to the new course of the River Nene. The final stretch to Salters Lode lock is along Well Creek, passing over the top of the Middle Level Main Drain on Mullicourt Aqueduct.

The alternative route via Horseway sluice and the Old Bedford River is unusable, as the lock at Welches Dam was declared unsafe and closed in 2006, and a reedbed has taken hold. Very low water levels between Horseway sluice and Welches Dam lock often prevented passage. This stands to be improved, however, as part of the Fens Waterways Link project, which includes plans for improving the route through the Middle Levels from Stanground to Salters Lode and to Welches Dam.

== Points of interest ==
Point	Coordinates (Links to map resources)	OS Grid Ref	Notes
St Germans pumping station	52.7033°N 0.3505°E	TF589143	St Germans pumping station
Salters Lode Lock	52.5898°N 0.3403°E	TF586016	access to River Great Ouse
Mullicourt Aqueduct	52.6025°N 0.2590°E	TF530029	crosses main drain
Marmount Priory Lock	52.5894°N 0.1953°E	TF488013	
Horseway Sluice	52.4614°N 0.1118°E	TL435869	unusable in 2013
Ashline Lock	52.5509°N 0.1250°W	TL272964	
Stanground Sluice	52.5601°N 0.2182°W	TL208972	access to River Nene
Lodes End Lock	52.4689°N 0.1070°W	TL286873	
Tebbits Bridge pumping station	52.5054°N 0.1649°W	TL246913	

== Bibliography ==
- Blackmore, David (20 April 2011). "St German's pumping station, near King's Lynn, officially opened". Eastern Daily Press. Archived from the original on 6 December 2020.
- Blair, Andrew Hunter (2006). Fenland Waterways of the Middle Level. Imray Laurie Norie and Wilson. ISBN 978-0-85288-994-7.
- Boyes, John; Russell, Ronald (1977). The Canals of Eastern England. David and Charles. ISBN 978-0-7153-7415-3.
- Cumberlidge, Jane (2009). Inland Waterways of Great Britain (8th Ed.). Imray Laurie Norie and Wilson. ISBN 978-1-84623-010-3.
- Hinde, K. S. G. (2006). Fenland Pumping Engines. Landmark Publishing Ltd. ISBN 978-1-84306-188-5.
- Page, William; Proby, Granville; Ladds, S Inskip, eds. (1936). "The Middle Level of the Fens and its reclamation". A History of the County of Huntingdon. Victoria County History. Vol. 3.
- Skempton, Sir Alec; et al. (2002). A Biographical Dictionary of Civil Engineers in Great Britain and Ireland: Vol 1: 1500 to 1830. Thomas Telford. ISBN 0-7277-2939-X.
- Sly, Rex (2003). From Punt to Plough - The History of the Fens. Sutton Publishing. ISBN 978-0-7509-3398-8.
- Smith, William P (2021). The Ancient Town of Wella. Carillson Publications. ISBN 978-09543997-6-4.
- Squires, Roger (2008). Britain's restored canals. Landmark Publishing. ISBN 978-1-84306-331-5.
