= Molycourt Priory =

Priory in Norfolk, England

Coordinates: 52.6021°N 0.2611°E

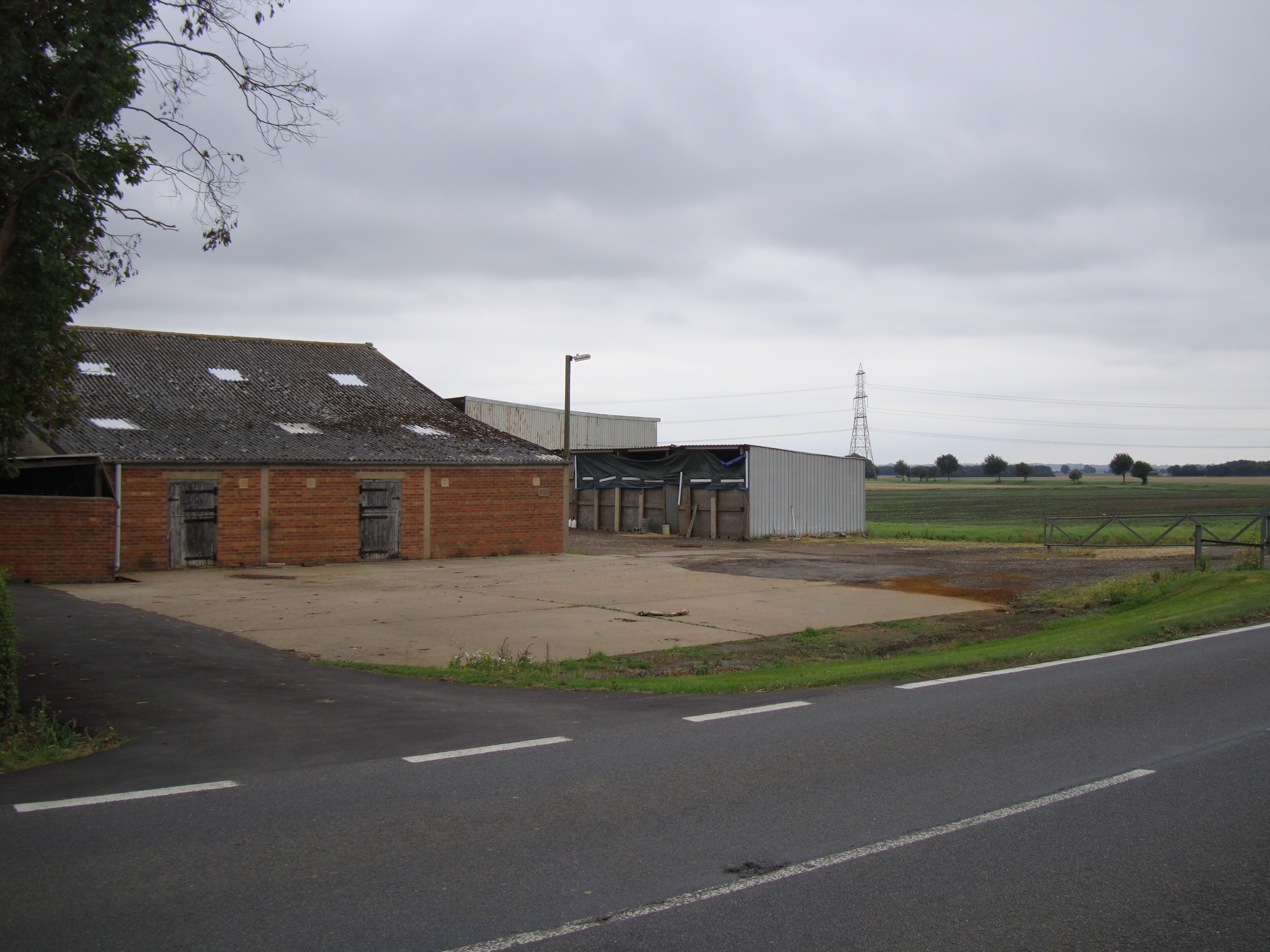
- Site of Molycourt (Mullicourt) Priory, now occupied by a farm.
- Interactive map of Molycourt Priory

Monastery information
- Full name: Priory of St Mary de Bello Loco
- Other name: Mullicourt Priory
- Order: Benedictine
- Established: pre-1066
- Disestablished: 1536/7
- Mother house: Ely Cathedral
- Dedication: Virgin Mary
- Diocese: Diocese of Ely

Site
- Location: Outwell, Norfolk, England
- Grid reference: TF532029
- Visible remains: none except recorded inhumations
- Public access: private

The Priory of St Mary de Bello Loco, commonly referred to as Molycourt Priory, was a small Benedictine priory located in the parish of Outwell, Norfolk, England.

Little is known of its history; its foundation appears to predate the Norman Conquest. Never a rich priory, as a result of a great storm and repeated floods its lands in Wiggenhall, Outwell, Upwell and Downham Market would only provide a living for a single monk. By 1446, Henry VI licensed its appropriation by the prior of Ely and it became a cell of Ely Priory.

At the Dissolution of the Monasteries in 1539 when the monastery of Ely was dissolved it appears to have consisted of two monks, possibly older monks from Ely living in the house. It was valued at £6 14s. 11d. No trace of the buildings exist, the site now being a farm. Some human remains were discovered in 1974 but a test pit dug in 1998 appears to have found no trace of the location of the priory building.
