= Well Creek =

River in Norfolk, England

Coordinates: 52.589167°N 0.340278°E

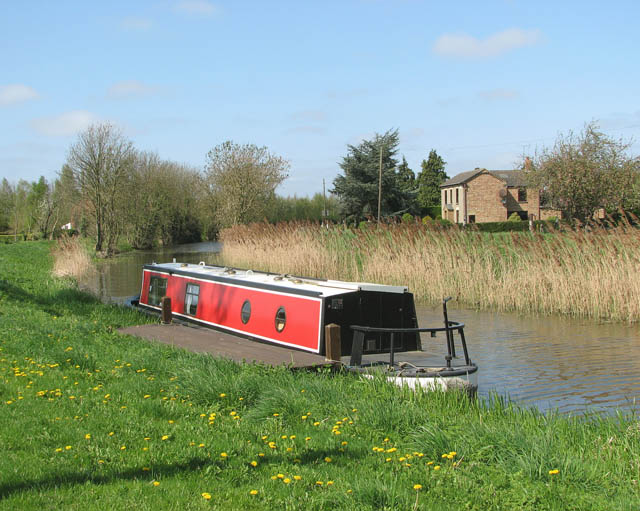
A boat mooring on Well Creek

Well Creek is a waterway in Norfolk, England that is a tributary to the River Great Ouse. Rising from the River Nene, the waterway in its current alignment dates to the 12th century; it flows through the villages of Upwell, Outwell, Nordelph and ends at the hamlet of Salters Lode. It is actively maintained by the Well Creek Trust, which was formed on 23 March 1970 on a decision of the Norfolk County Council after plans were made to disband the waterway. Alongside being a popular waterway for mooring, it is also used for fishing and an annual raft race, where entrants build their own home-made rafts out of miscellaneous items and materials.
