= Wiggenhall =

Wiggenhall may refer to the following places in Norfolk, England:

- Wiggenhall St Germans
  - Wiggenhall St Germans SSSI
- Wiggenhall St Mary Magdalen
