= Wells Creek (disambiguation) =

Wells Creek is a stream in Whatcom County, Washington.

Wells Creek may also refer to:

- Wells Creek (Minnesota), a stream in Minnesota
- Wells Creek (Mohawk River), a stream in New York

== See also ==
- Well Creek
