= Nordelph =

Civil parish in Norfolk, England

Coordinates: 52.583652°N 0.295944°E

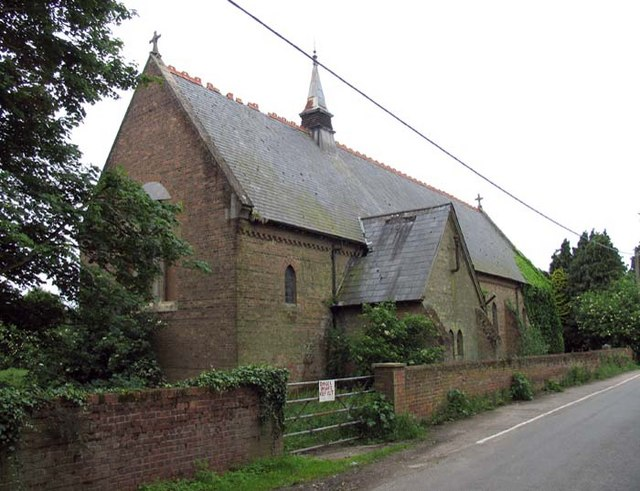
- Holy Trinity, Nordelph

- Location within Norfolk
- Area: 16.57 km^{2} (6.40 sq mi)
- Population: 405
  - Density: 24/km^{2} (62/sq mi)
- OS grid reference: TF556008
- Civil parish: Nordelph
- District: King's Lynn and West Norfolk
- Shire county: Norfolk
- Region: East
- Country: England
- Sovereign state: United Kingdom
- Post town: DOWNHAM MARKET
- Postcode district: PE38
- Police: Norfolk
- Fire: Norfolk
- Ambulance: East of England

Nordelph is a civil parish near Downham Market in the English county of Norfolk.

The parish covers an area of 16.57 km^{2} (6.40 sq mi) and had a population of 375 in 151 households at the 2001 census, increasing to 405 at the 2011 Census. In 1930, a new civil parish of Nordelph was created in Downham Rural District, taking land mostly out of the Marshland RD parishes of Upwell and Outwell.

For the purposes of local government, Nordelph falls within the district of King's Lynn and West Norfolk.

The Church of England parish church, Holy Trinity, is of brick in the Early English style, and was built in 1865 as a chapel of ease to the parish church of Upwell. A new ecclesiastical parish was formed in 1909 from the parishes of Upwell, Downham West, Denver, Stow Bardolph and Outwell. The Reverend Edwin Emmanuel Bradford (1860–1944), Uranian poet and novelist, was vicar of Nordelph from 1909 to 1944. In 1912, there were also Wesleyan Methodist and United Methodist chapels.

== History ==
In 1830, it was reported that the rector of Upwell, near Wisbech, in order to furnish to the inhabitants of Nordelph, four miles distant from the parish church, a chance of attending the sacred place, had engaged a packet for £12 per annum, to convey them regularly every Sunday morning. Those who know the character of the poorer inhabitants, whilst they give the reverend divine credit for his good instructions, have expressed it as their opinion that it will be of little service unless he furnishes them generously with pipes and tobacco whilst on board the ship.
