= St Mary the Virgin's Church, Wiggenhall =

Coordinates: 52.7042°N 0.3409°E

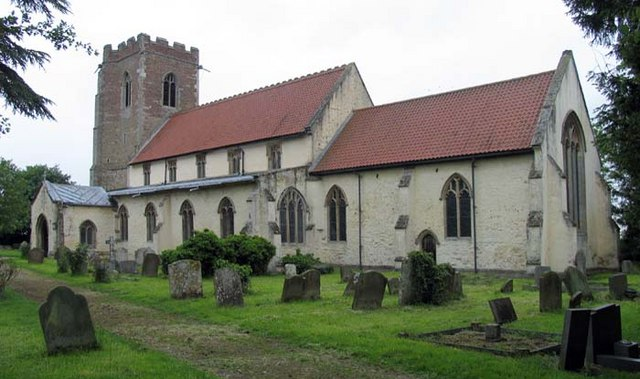
- St Mary the Virgin's Church, Wiggenhall, from the southeast

- Location in Norfolk
- OS grid reference: TF582144
- Location: Wiggenhall St Mary the Virgin, Norfolk
- Country: England
- Denomination: Anglican
- Website: Churches Conservation Trust

History
- Dedication: St Mary the Virgin

Architecture
- Functional status: Redundant
- Heritage designation: Grade I
- Designated: 8 July 1959
- Architect: G. E. Street (restoration)
- Architectural type: Church
- Style: Perpendicular
- Groundbreaking: 13th century

Specifications
- Materials: Carstone and brick Slate and lead roofs

St Mary the Virgin's Church is a redundant Anglican church in the civil parish of Wiggenhall St Germans, Norfolk, England. It is recorded in the National Heritage List for England as a designated Grade I listed building, and is under the care of the Churches Conservation Trust. The church stands at the end of a lane to the north of the village of Wiggenhall St Mary the Virgin, some 5 miles (8 km) south of King's Lynn. It is notable particularly for the quality of carving of its wooden fittings.

== History ==
The north and south doorways date from the 13th century, and the rest of the church from about 1400. It was restored in 1862 by G. E. Street.

== Architecture ==
=== Exterior ===
The church is constructed in carrstone and brick. The aisles have lead roofs, and the nave and chancel are slated. Its plan consists of a nave with a clerestory and North and south aisles, a south porch, a chancel and a west tower. Its architectural style is Perpendicular, and it is said to be a "fine example" of this style. The tower is in three stages, and has angle buttresses and stair turrets. In the lowest stage is a west window in Perpendicular style. The middle stage contains lancet windows. In the top stage are two-light Perpendicular bell openings. The parapet is battlemented. The east and west windows of the aisles contain three-light Perpendicular windows, and in their side walls are two-light windows. The south porch is in brick and it has a tunnel vault. Above the exterior doorway is a sundial dated 1742. On both sides of the porch are two-light Perpendicular windows. The south door dates from the 13th century, and has two orders of columns. The clerestory has five windows on each side. On the north side is another 13th-century door with two orders of columns. The chancel contains two two-light windows on the south side, and one similar window and a priest's door on the north side. The Perpendicular east window has four lights.

=== Interior ===
Inside the church are five-bay arcades between the nave and the aisles. The chancel contains a piscina. The dado of the chancel screen, which dates from a period between about 1500 and 1525, is in two bays on each side. Each side is divided into two panels, all of which contain paintings of saints. The pulpit dates from the early 17th century and has an associated reading desk and sounding board. In the southeast of the church is a parclose screen dating from the early 16th century which has a frieze of Perpendicular tracery. The font cover dated 1625 is elaborate. It consists of four columns supporting an arcade with pendants, and has a conical roof with a ball finial on which is a vulning pelican. The brass lectern is dated 1518. The benches date from about 1500, or earlier, and are carved with pierced patterns, tracery, figures of saints in niches, crenellated buttresses, animals and poppyheads.

In the north aisle is a monument to Sir Henry Kervil who died in 1624. It consists of an alabaster tomb chest on which lie the recumbent effigies of Sir Henry and his wife. On the wall above this is a blank tablet surrounded by Corinthian columns supporting an entablature containing a coat of arms. A brass in the floor of the south aisle is to the memory of Sir Robert Kervile, and is in the shape of a heart. Sir Robert died abroad, his wife retrieved his heart and buried it in the church. The two-manual organ was built in 1880 by G.M. Holdich, and was donated to the church by the squire, George Helsham. There is a ring of six bells. The oldest two of these were cast in 1638 by John Draper, one bell was cast in 1765 by Joseph Eayre, and the remaining three are dated 1873, cast by John Warner and Sons.

== See also ==
- List of churches preserved by the Churches Conservation Trust in the East of England
