= Middle Level Commissioners =

Land drainage authority in eastern England

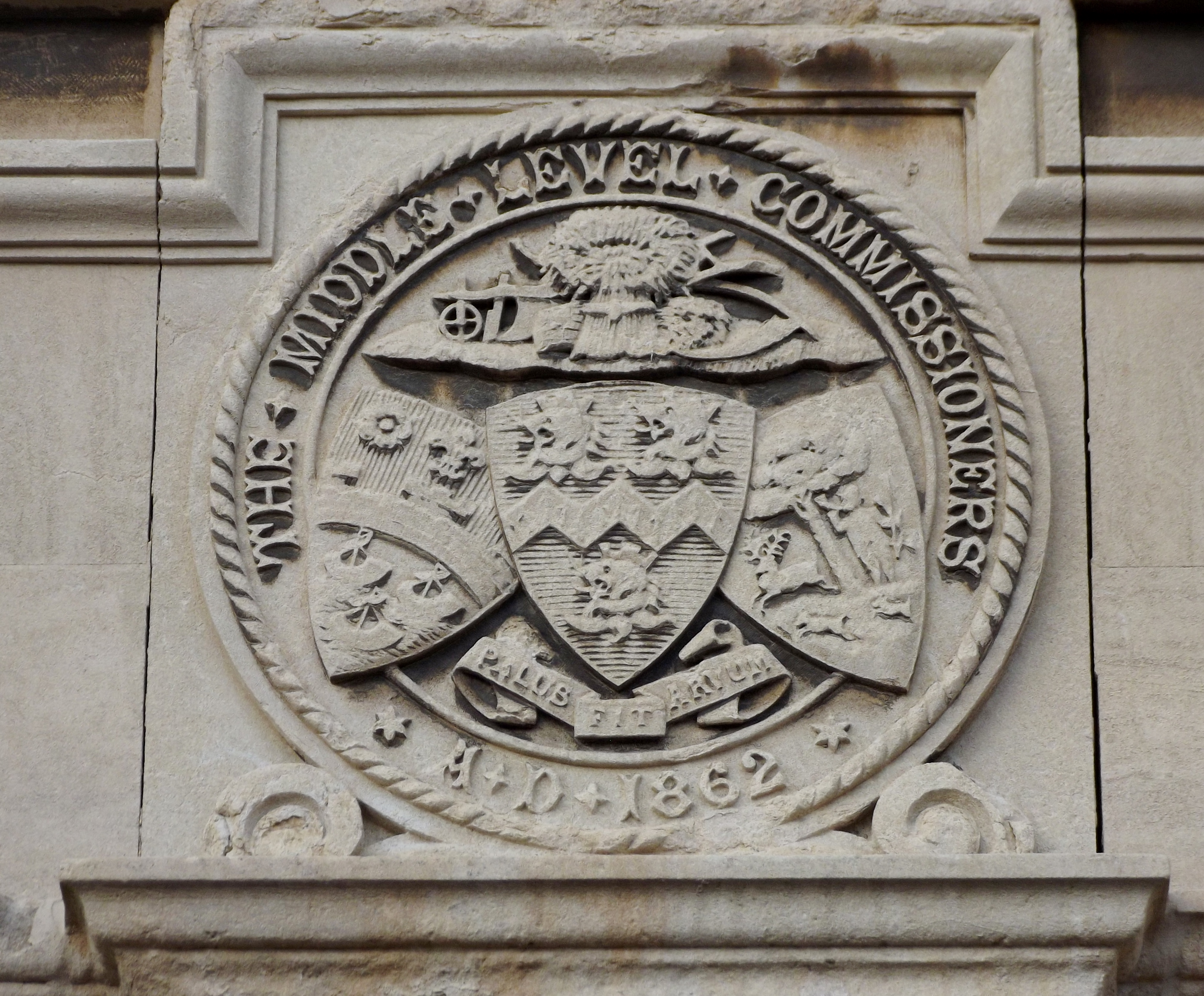
Badge on the former Middle Level Commissioners offices in March, Cambridgeshire

The Middle Level Commissioners are a land drainage authority in eastern England. The body was formed in 1862, undertaking the main water level management function within the Middle Level following the breakup of the former Bedford Level Corporation.

The Middle Level is the central and largest section of the Great Level of The Fens, which was reclaimed by drainage during the mid-17th Century. The area is bounded on the northwest and east by the River Nene and Ouse washes, on the north by previously drained Marshland silts and to the south and west by low clay hills. The Middle Level river system consists of over 120 miles (190 km) of watercourses most of which are statutory navigations and has a catchment of over 170,000 acres (690 km^{2}).

Location of the Middle Level Commissioners' Catchment Boundary

== History ==
In the distant past Great Britain was part of continental Europe with the rivers of eastern England being tributaries of the River Rhine, which flowed across a flat, marshy plain, which is now the southern North Sea. Around 12,000 years ago, following the end of the last Ice Age, the sea levels rose, severing Britain from Europe and flooding the Fen Basin, a large hollow created as the ice retreated. The fen area gradually became separated from the sea by extensive sand banks, which circled the fringes of the Wash. Within the fens, dense vegetation grew in the fresh water forming peat deposits, which built up over some 6,000 years. During the Roman occupation, some embankments were erected to protect agricultural land from inundation by rivers and sea water, but when they left in 406, the Fens became a wilderness of marshes and flooding again. However, some settlement occurred, particularly on a number of clay islands within the fens, including Ely and Ramsey. The last stand against the Norman invaders took place in the region, and ended in defeat when Hereward the Wake was betrayed by the monks of Ely in 1071.

The early thirteenth century was a particularly wet period, and the Fens suffered from frequent flooding. Recognition that any solution needed organising centrally came in 1258, when the first Commissioners of Sewers were appointed. They found it difficult to fund any kind of drainage works, as the population were unwilling to pay for them, but around 1400, the commissioners were given powers to raise taxes and punish those who refused to contribute. John Morton, the bishop of Ely, set about straightening parts of the River Nene between 1478 and 1490, and Morton's Leam still bears his name. The Wars of the Roses interrupted his plans for further land drainage projects, and the Dissolution of the Monasteries between 1536 and 1539 had a catastrophic effect on the region. Monasteries had supervised many land drainage initiatives, but once they were replaced by hundreds of small landowners, there was neither the resources nor the organisation to maintain the works, which rapidly fell into disrepair. High sea levels in 1570 broke through the Roman sea defences, and vast areas were flooded, as far inland as Bedfordshire.

The next major advance was the construction of Popham's Eau, a channel connecting the River Nene to the River Great Ouse, which was completed in 1605. The project was the inspiration of Sir John Popham, the Lord Chief Justice, who assembled a team of associates to complete the work, all of whom would benefit from it. There were, however, still major problems with flooding in the Fens, and several commissions were held in the early seventeenth century to investigate what could be done. Finally, in 1630, Francis Russell, 4th Earl of Bedford assembled a group of 13 other Adventurers, and with the approval of King Charles I, embarked on a grand project to turn all of the Great Level of the Fens into agricultural land. They were opposed by the local population, many of whom made a living from fishing, wild-fowling, catching eels and cutting reeds.

They employed the Dutch engineer Sir Cornelius Vermuyden to manage the scheme, and he was given six years to complete it. When finished, they would divide 43,000 acres (170 km^{2}) between themselves, in recompense for the money they had invested into the works. Another 12,000 acres (49 km^{2}) would be given to the king, and 40,000 acres (160 km^{2}) would be leased out with rents being used to maintain the works. There were nine major components to the works, including the Bedford River, (later called the Old Bedford River), which ran for 21 miles (34 km) from Earith to Salters Lode; Bevill's Leam, which ran for 2 miles (3.2 km) from Whittlesey Mere to Guyhirn; Peakirk Drain, which ran for 10 miles (16 km) from Peterborough Great Fen to Guyhirn; and improvements and reworking of Morton's Leam. The straight course of the Bedford River was 10 miles (16 km) shorter than the old course of the Great Ouse, which meandered through Ely. The scheme was declared complete by a Session of Sewers, which met on 12 October 1637 at St Ives, but the following wet winter showed that there were serious flaws in its execution.

The Royal Commission of Sewers reversed the decision when it met at Huntingdon in 1639, and an act of Parliament passed in 1649 (the "Pretended Act") authorised William Russell, 5th Earl of Bedford and his associates (the Company of Adventurers) to further drain the land. The act divided the Bedford Level into three parts, each with its own Board of Commissioners, and so the North Level, the Middle Level and the South Level were formed. Vermuyden again managed the works, which included the cutting of the New Bedford River, running parallel to the Old Bedford Level, which created a huge washland covering 4,700 acres (19 km^{2}) from Earith to Salters Lode to store flood water. Most of the work carried out was in the Middle Levels; some took place in the North Levels, but Vermuyen's plan for the South Level of a channel to prevent water from the rivers on the eastern edge of the fens from ever entering the lowlands was shelved, and was not finally implemented until the Cut-off Channel was built in the late 1960s and early 1970s. The South Level Barrier Bank to the east and the Middle Level Barrier Bank to the west were constructed to protect the Middle Level from the flood waters. The work was again declared to be complete in 1656.

By this time Parliament had taken over much of the king's former authority and it was deemed necessary and desirable to reincorporate the company via an act of Parliament in order to satisfactorily manage the completion and maintenance of the scheme. The Bedford Level Corporation was created by the General Drainage Act 1663 (15 Cha. 2. c. 17) which received royal assent on 27 July 1663. The corporation's general objectives remained unchanged but its powers in respect of navigation rights and taxation were much improved. The organisation was to comprise a governor, six bailiffs, 20 conservators and the commonalty.

The improved drainage caused a rapid shrinkage of the peat fen and land levels dropped. The rivers remained at their original levels, as their beds were covered in a layer of sand, and soon the rivers were higher than the surrounding land. Within 30 years flooding returned, and although the advent of wind pumps to raise water into the rivers helped the situation a little, it was not until the arrival of steam pumps in the early nineteenth century that the vision of the Adventurers was realised. Steam was replaced by diesel engines from 1913 and by automated electric pumps from 1948.

=== Middle Level ===
The Middle Level suffered from the fact that the Nene flowed through it, and its outfall at Salters Lode was restricted by a sluice. Its channel was in a poor state, and some 250 mills had been erected to pump water into the drainage channels. Another issue was that the drains were used both for navigation, which required high water levels) and for drainage of the Fens, which required low water levels. Both groups petitioned the Bedford Level Corporation, who still had overall responsibility for the Middle Level, and in 1753, the Nene Act 1753 was obtained. This allowed the commissioners to collect tolls from all traffic using the Nene, which would be used to fund the scouring and deepening of the channel. However, it also prohibited use of the Tongs Drain, an emergency flood relief channel, until flooding had already occurred, which was clearly unsatisfactory.

Bedford Level (Middle Level) Drainage Act 1810
- Act of Parliament
- Parliament of the United Kingdom
- Long title: An Act for improving the Drainage of certain Lands within the North and South West Parts of the Middle Level, Part of the Great Level of the Fens commonly called Bedford Level.
- Citation: 50 Geo. 3. c. cxxv

Dates
- Royal assent: 24 May 1810

Text of statute as originally enacted

Middle Level Drainage and Navigation Act 1844
- Act of Parliament
- Parliament of the United Kingdom
- Long title: An Act for improving the Drainage and Navigation of the Middle Level of the Fens.
- Citation: 7 & 8 Vict. c. cvi
- Territorial extent: United Kingdom

Dates
- Royal assent: 9 August 1844
- Commencement: 9 August 1844 (Note: The Acts of Parliament (Commencement) Act 1793.)

Other legislation
- Amended by: Middle Level Drainage Amendment Act 1848

After protracted debate, the Bedford Level (Middle Level) Drainage Act 1810 (50 Geo. 3. c. cxxv), also known as the Middle Level Act 1810, was obtained. This created commissioners who were entirely separate from the Bedford Level Corporation, with powers to raise drainage rates. All of the commissioners had to own land within the levels, and they had control of the internal waterways within the Level, although the Bedford Corporation were still responsible for the banks. The Middle Level was more or less independent from this point. Drainage of the Middle Levels remained difficult, and rival schemes to divert the water through Wisbech and King's Lynn were proposed from 1836 onwards. All met with opposition but in 1843 a bill was prepared for a new channel (Middle Level Main Drain) to an outfall at Wiggenhall St Germans, some 9 miles further down the Great Ouse, where low tide levels were 7 feet (2.1 m) lower than at Salters Lode. The Bedford Level Corporation opposed the bill, as they felt that reducing the volume of water between Salters Lode and St Germans would lead to further deterioration of the river channel, but despite fierce opposition, the Middle Level Drainage and Navigation Act 1844 (7 & 8 Vict. c. cvi) was passed. As well as powers to raise more rates, the commissioners also received an annual payment from the Bedford Level Corporation, who no longer had to maintain Tongs Drain. The new main drain was completed in 1848.

Middle Level Act 1862
- Act of Parliament
- Parliament of the United Kingdom
- Long title: An Act to separate the Middle Level from the Bedford Level Corporation; to transfer the Powers and Duties of the Nene Navigation Commissioners to the Middle Level Commissioners, and to provide for Payment of the Debt secured on the Navigation Tolls; to repeal the Barrier Banks Acts; to amend the Middle Level Acts, and to incorporate the Middle Level Commissioners; to amend and enlarge the Powers of Commissioners acting under District Acts in the Middle Level; and for other Purposes.
- Citation: 25 & 26 Vict. c. clxxxviii

Dates
- Royal assent: 29 July 1862

Text of statute as originally enacted

Until 1862, the Middle Level Commissioners were still nominally part of the Bedford Level Corporation, but this was resolved by the Middle Level Act 1862 (25 & 26 Vict. c. clxxxviii), which resulted in the corporation having no jurisdiction to the west of the Old Bedford River. The commissioners took over all property, control and powers to raise taxes which they did not already have, and became a self-governing drainage authority. The outfall sluice at St Germans lasted until 1862, when pressure of water destroyed it. The tides flowed along the outfall channel, flooding around 9 square miles (23 km^{2}) of land. The replacement dam and syphons did not work well, and were replaced by a new sluice in 1880. This in turn was replaced by a pumping station in 1934, at the time the largest flood defence pumping station in the United Kingdom. It was replaced by a new pumping station in 2010, which retains that title.

== The Middle Level Commissioners ==
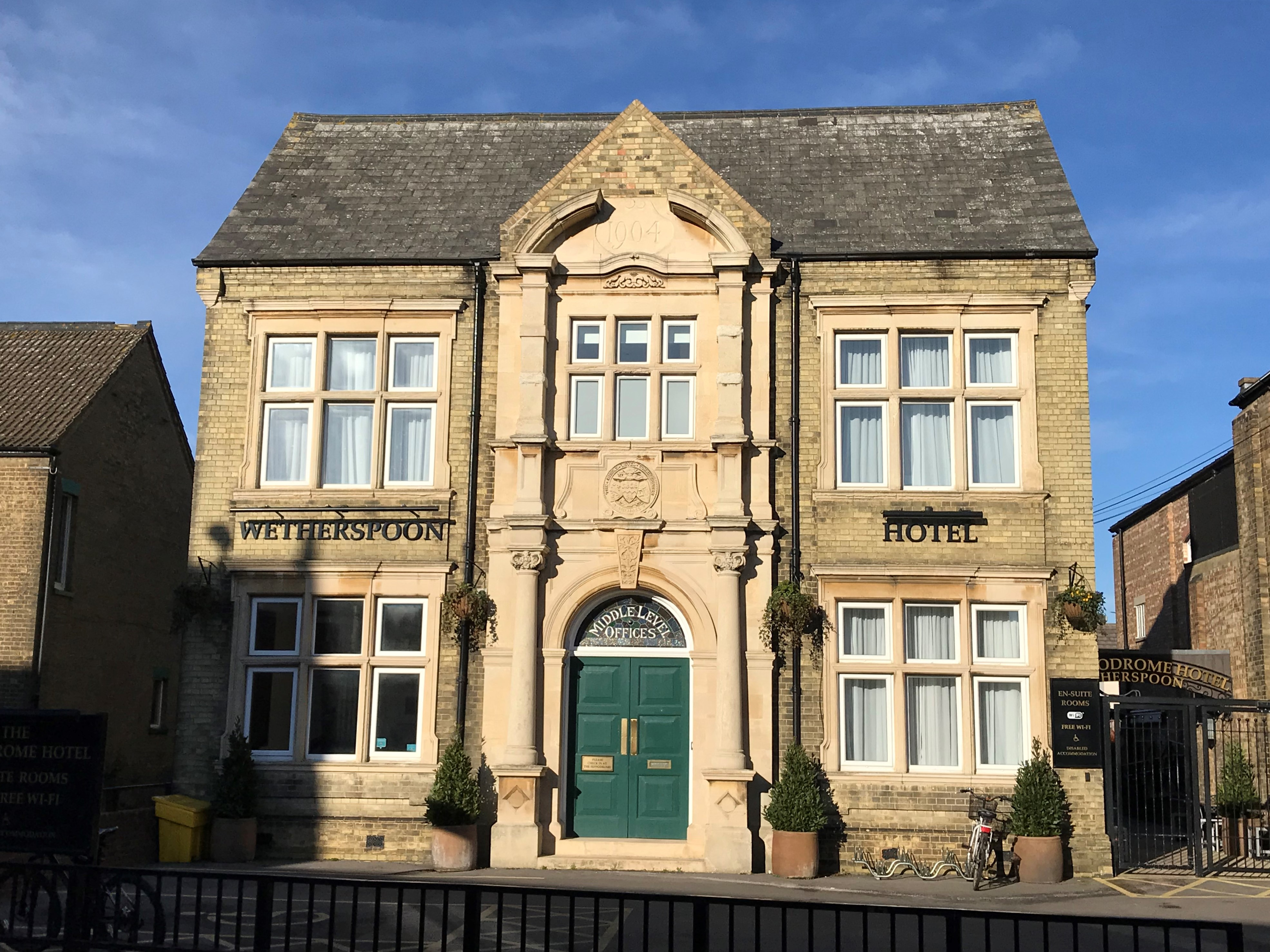
Former offices of the Middle Level Commissioners in March

The Middle Level Commissioners consist of representatives from both the agricultural and non-agricultural sectors. Occupiers of agricultural property receive a rate demand direct from the Commissioners. The "rates" on non-agricultural properties, such as houses and factories, are paid through a special levy issued to the district councils within the Commissioners' area. These councils, Fenland District Council, Huntingdonshire District Council and the Borough Council of King's Lynn & West Norfolk are therefore, able to appoint representatives as Commissioners in respect of the payment made in relation to these properties.

The Middle Level Offices are now at 85 Whittlesey Road in March. The former offices in Dartford Road, dating to 1904, were bought by Wetherspoons and opened as The Hippodrome Hotel in 2014.

== Internal drainage boards ==
Within the Middle Level there are 34 independent internal drainage boards initially set up in the 18th century and each responsible for the local drainage of their area. Most have pumping stations and discharge their run-off into the main Middle Level watercourses. Many of these IDBs are administered from the Middle Level Offices and their administrative and financial work is carried out by Middle Level staff. In addition, Middle Level staff also undertake engineering and planning liaison consultancy work for a large number of Boards. The Internal drainage districts administered by the Middle Level Commissioners are:

- Benwick IDB
- Bluntisham IDB
- Churchfield and Plawfield IDB
- Conington and Holme IDB
- Curf and Wimblington Combined IDB
- Euximoor IDB
- Haddenham Level Drainage Commissioners
- Hundred Foot Washes IDB
- Hundred of Wisbech IDB
- Manea and Welney District Drainage Commissioners
- March East IDB
- March Fifth District Drainage Commissioners
- March Sixth District Drainage Commissioners
- March Third District Drainage Commissioners
- March West and White Fen IDB
- Needham and Laddus IDB
- Nightlayers IDB
- Nordelph IDB
- Over and Willingham IDB
- Ramsey First (Hollow) IDB
- Ramsey Fourth (Middlemoor) IDB
- Ramsey Upwood and Great Raveley IDB
- Ransonmoor District Drainage Commissioners
- Sawtry IDB
- Sutton and Mepal IDB
- Swavesey Internal Drainage Board
- Upwell IDB
- Waldersey IDB
- Warboys Somersham and Pidley IDB

== Navigation ==
The Middle Level, apart from its flood protection role, is also the fourth largest navigation authority in the United Kingdom and is responsible for approximately 100 miles (160 kilometres) of statutory navigation and operates six navigation locks. The Nene-Ouse Navigation Link forms part of the Middle Level Navigations. The Link is at present is the only connection between the Great Ouse and the Main Canal Network. During a normal summer, over 1,000 passages of the Link-Route are made by pleasure craft. The Commissioners issue Navigation Notes, which provide navigation details for boat owners, who wish to use the system.

The Middle Level Waterways Users Committee consists of representatives of the Commissioners and Users of the Middle Level system. It advises the Commissioners of the different requirements for water use in the Middle Level area and assists them in meeting such requirements so far as the Commissioners are able to do.

== Conservation ==
Within the Middle Level Catchment there are three major national nature reserves at Woodwalton Fen, Monks Wood and Holme Fen as well as a number of smaller sites of more local interest. The Commissioners have a statutory duty to further nature conservation in the performance of their functions and operate a specific conservation strategy, which forms a basis for all their river maintenance operations. There is also a close working relationship with Natural England, in particular through the Conservation Committee, which includes representatives of the Commissioners, the Environment Agency, Natural England and the local Wildlife Trusts.

== Bibliography ==
- Darby, H. C. (1956). The Draining of the Fen. Cambridge University Press. ISBN 978-0-521-07430-8.
- Gerrard, Valerie (2003). The Story of the Fens. London: Robert Hale. ISBN 978-0-7090-7071-9.
- Hills, Richard L. (2008). The Drainage of the Fens. Landmark Publishing. ISBN 978-1-84306-323-0.
- Page, William; Proby, Granville; Inskip Ladds, S., eds. (1936). A History of the County of Huntingdon. Victoria County History. Vol. 3. pp. 249–290, 'The Middle Level of the Fens and its reclamation'.
- Wells, Samuel (1830). The History of the Drainage of the Great Level of the Fens, called Bedford Level. Published for the author, by R. Pheney.
