= Downham West =

Civil parish in Norfolk, England

Coordinates: 52.60242°N 0.34058°E

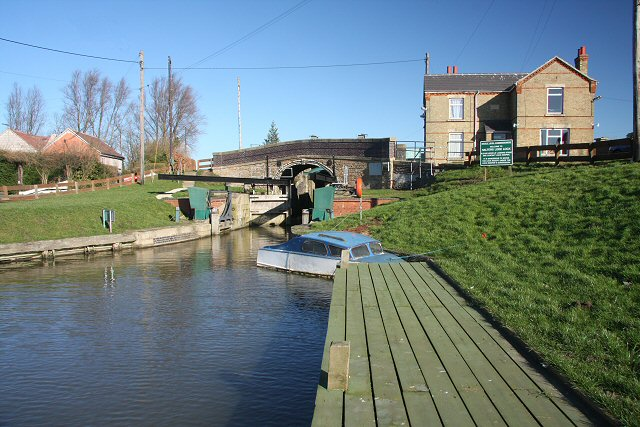
- Salters Lode bridge and lock, Downham West

- Location within Norfolk
- Population: 286 (2011 census)
- OS grid reference: TF5801
  - London: 96.2 miles (154.8 km)
- Civil parish: Downham West
- District: King's Lynn and West Norfolk
- Shire county: Norfolk
- Region: East
- Country: England
- Sovereign state: United Kingdom
- Post town: DOWNHAM MARKET
- Postcode district: PE38
- Dialling code: 01366
- Police: Norfolk
- Fire: Norfolk
- Ambulance: East of England
- UK Parliament: South West Norfolk

Downham West is a civil parish in the English county of Norfolk The parish is 47.6 miles (76.6 km) west of Norwich, 16.3 miles (26.2 km) south-south-west of King's Lynn and 96.2 miles (154.8 km) north of London. The nearest town is Downham Market which is 2.5 miles (4.0 km) north east of the parish. The nearest railway station is at Downham Market for the Fen Line which runs between King's Lynn and Cambridge. The nearest airport is Norwich International Airport. The parish of Downham West, in the 2001 census, has a population of 285, rising marginally to 286 at the Census 2011. For the purposes of local government, the parish falls within the district of King's Lynn and West Norfolk.

== Description ==
West Downham is a small Fenland parish in the west of the county of Norfolk. There is no village called West Downham within the parish, only a small hamlet which is called Salters Lode. The hamlet is strung out along the A1122 road that hugs the drains and the course of the Great Ouse river, and consist of a few isolated farms standing out in the Fen. The name of Downham comes from the Old English meaning 'homestead on a hill', and West designation from the direction from nearby Downham Market.

Salters Lode derives its name the Old English meaning 'place where salt is kept', and 'watercourse or drainage channel'.

== Salters Lode ==
The hamlet of Salters Lode is scattered around a lock at the end of the Well Creek navigation. Well Creek is part of the Middle-Level system and on the route that forms a navigation link between the river Nene and river Great Ouse.

=== History ===
During the period that the area was occupied by the Romans Salters Lode became an important part of the salt industry on the Fen edge. A Roman road called the Fen Causeway which ran through the Fens to Ermine Street at Peterborough, passed through the parish of Downham West on a strip of silt that rises above the level of the peat. With the proximity of this road, salt working became an important industry in this area and giving rise to the hamlet's name. In 1993 the Norfolk Archaeological Unit discovered the site of a Roman salt works in West Downham dating to the 3rd and the 4th centuries. The excavations revealed a series of enclosures, structures and turbaries along with a ditched Roman field system and what was once a Roman canal. The archaeologist also found Roman coins and pottery. This evidence has led to the conclusion that there had been Roman settlement and industrial activity of a substantial level in the area.

=== Salters Lode Lock ===
The lock is managed and owned by the Middle Level Commissioners inland drainage authority. This authority is responsible for the middle-level network of drains, primarily for land drainage in the area, but also the navigation link between the two rivers. Salters Lode lock is part of the Denver complex which makes up the main gateway onto the Great Ouse navigation system from the tidal river. The Denver complex consists of a number of locks and sluices that are used for navigation access and management of water levels on the numerous waterways that characterise this part of The Fens.

=== Salters Lode smockmill ===
The Ordnance Survey map of 1836 has the position of Salters Lode smockmill located on land between what is now the A1122 road and where Well Creek and the River Great Ouse converge. This mill began life as a drainage mill built by Drainage Commissioners, but was converted into a corn mill around c.1850. The mill had three pairs of stones which were driven by one pair of single-shuttered patent sails and one pair of common sails. The mill stood four-storeys high with the first being the base which was octagonal and constructed from brick. The main body of the mill was constructed of tarred vertical weatherboarding. At the top of the mill was a boat-shaped cap. There was no fantail and a tailpole with steps on each side was used to turn the mill into the wind. The mill ceased working in 1924 and was standing in a derelict state in 1949. Today there is no evidence of the mill to be seen.
