= Bedford Level Corporation =

The Bedford Level Corporation (or alternatively the Corporation of the Bedford Level) was founded in England in 1663 to manage the draining of the Fens of East Central England. It formalised the legal status of the Company of Adventurers previously formed by the Earl of Bedford to reclaim 95,000 acres (380 km^{2}) of the Bedford Level.

== History ==
The low-lying land of East Central England, known as the Fens, consisted traditionally of semi-continuous marshland and peat bog interspersed with isolated patches of higher ground. Agriculture has only been made possible by a co-ordinated system of drainage ditches. During medieval times this was controlled by the great monasteries in the area but fell into disrepair after the dissolution of the monasteries. By the 1600s the general drainage situation was so bad that King James I invited Cornelius Vermuyden, the Dutch engineer, to devise a scheme to drain the Great Fen.

Map of eastern England, showing position of the Fens

== The Bedford Level ==
The Great Fen, lying between the Wash and Cambridge, is more popularly known as the Bedford Level after Francis Russell, 4th Earl of Bedford, who owned a large part of it. It covers some 300,000 acres (1,200 km^{2}) in the historical counties of Northamptonshire, Norfolk, Suffolk, Lincolnshire, Cambridgeshire and Huntingdonshire and much of it lies below sea level. It was divided under Vermuyden's plan into three areas, North, Middle and South Level.

== The Company of Adventurers ==
Following the King's initiative, the Earl of Bedford was asked to undertake the freeing of the Bedford Level from flooding as an alternative to giving the project to Vermuyden. In 1630 he agreed a contract with the Commissioners of Sewers (who were responsible for fenland drainage) which was known as the "Lynn Law" after the town of King's Lynn where it was drawn up. The earl and his 12 associates, known as adventurers (i.e. venture capitalists), contracted to drain the southern part of the fens within six years in return for 95,000 acres (380 km^{2}) of the reclaimed land. 12,000 acres (49 km^{2}) would go to the King and 80,000 acres (320 km^{2}) would be allocated amongst the adventurers in proportion to their financial investment. The latter would be in terms of £500 shares, 20 in all. The shares were wholly and partly transferable and thus the list of shareholders changed and grew. Charges on the land reclaimed would fund maintenance and future development. The constitution and the rights to levy charges was confirmed by royal charter in the name of Charles I.

The original adventurers were:

Name	Shares	Allocation (acres)	Notes
Francis Russell, 4th Earl of Bedford	2	8,000	
Sir Miles Sandys, 1st Baronet	2	8,000	
Sir William Russell	2	8,000	MP, of Chippenham, Cambridgeshire. Commissioner of Sewers for Great Fen
William Tyringham	2	8,000	MP, of Tyringham, Buckinghamshire
Anthony Hamond	2	8,000	of Saint Albons, Kent
Oliver St John, 1st Earl of Bolingbroke	1	4,000	
Edward, Baron Gorges of Dundalk	1	4,000	
Sir Robert Heath	1	4,000	Chief Justice of Common Plea
Sir Robert Bevill	1	4,000	MP for Huntingdonshire in 1621, Commissioner of Sewers, Great Fen
Sir Philibert Vernatti	1	4,000	of Carleton, Yorkshire
William Sams, LLD	1	4,000	Commissioner of Sewers
Samuel Spalding	1	4,000	of Cambridge
Andrewes Burrell	1	4,000	of London, Commissioner of Sewers
Sir Robert Lovett	1	4,000	of Liscombe Park, Buckinghamshire
??	1	4,000	
Total	20	80,000	

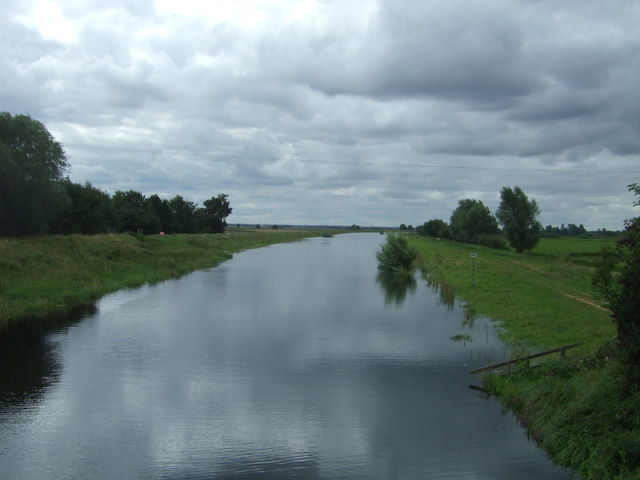
New Bedford River at Sutton Gault

Work got underway to dig several major new ditches and install sluices at the mouths of river to hold back the high tides. In particular a straight cut (now known as the Old Bedford River) was made in the Cambridgeshire Fens to join the River Great Ouse to the sea at King's Lynn. Many of these works had been sought by the Commissioners of Sewers for generations but lack of power and resources had prevented their implementation.

As time went by and construction costs rose it became clear that the adventurers company organisation was unsuitable for such a longterm project, beset as it was with issues of collecting charges and navigation interests. The fact that its legality only stemmed from a royal charter was another major problem. In 1638 the king revoked the contract, allocating 40,000 acres (160 km^{2}) to the Company of Adventurers and taking over as undertaker of the project himself. In 1640 Vermuyden was asked to take on the management of the work but by 1642 the political landscape had changed. The Civil War intervened and the project came to a halt until Vermuyden was able to resume work under parliamentary control in 1649 under the terms and conditions of what came to be called the "Pretended Act". He created the New Bedford River, also known as the Hundred Foot Drain (from its width), which ran parallel to the Old Bedford River with a flood plain (the Ouse Washes) between the two.

By this time Parliament had taken over much of the king's former authority and was deemed necessary and desirable to reincorporate the company via an Act of Parliament in order to satisfactorily manage the completion and maintenance of the scheme.

== Creation of the Bedford Level Corporation ==
Great Level of the Fens Drainage Act 1660
- Act of Parliament
- Parliament of England
- Long title: An Act for the necessary Maintenance of the Work of Draining the Great Level of the Fens.
- Citation: 12 Cha. 2. c. 2 Pr.
- Territorial extent: England and Wales

Dates
- Royal assent: 13 September 1660
- Commencement: 25 April 1660 (Note: Start of session.)
Other legislation
Amended by	Great Level of the Fens Drainage Act 1661
Relates to	Bedford Level Act 1663; Bedford Level Act 1665; Bedford Level Act 1667; Bedford Level Act 1685

Status: Amended

Great Level of the Fens Drainage Act 1661
- Act of Parliament
- Parliament of England
- Long title: An Act for confirming and continuing an Act, for the necessary Maintenance of the Work of draining the Great Level of the Fens.
- Citation: 13 Cha. 2. St. 1. c. 14 Pr.
- Territorial extent: England and Wales

Dates
- Royal assent: 30 July 1661
- Commencement: 8 May 1661
Other legislation
Amends	Great Level of the Fens Drainage Act 1660
Relates to	Bedford Level Act 1663; Bedford Level Act 1665; Bedford Level Act 1667; Bedford Level Act 1685

Status: Current legislation

Bedford Level Act 1663
- Act of Parliament
- Parliament of England
- Long title: An Act for settling the dreyning of the Great Levell of the Fenns called Bedford Levell.
- Citation: 15 Cha. 2. c. 17 (Note: This is the citation in The Statutes of the Realm.); 15 Cha. 2. c. 9 Pr. (Note: This is the citation in The Statutes at Large.)
- Territorial extent: England and Wales

Dates
- Royal assent: 27 July 1663
- Commencement: 18 February 1663 (Note: Start of session.)
Other legislation
Amended by	Bedford Level Act 1685
Relates to	Great Level of the Fens Drainage Act 1660; Great Level of the Fens Drainage Act 1661; Bedford Level Act 1667

Status: Amended

Text of statute as originally enacted

Bedford Level Act 1667
- Act of Parliament
- Parliament of England
- Long title: An Act for the taxing and assessing of the Lands of the Adventurers within the Great Levell of the Fenns.
- Citation: 19 & 20 Cha. 2. c. 13; 19 Cha. 2. c. 88 Pr.
- Territorial extent: England and Wales

Dates
- Royal assent: 9 May 1668
- Commencement: 10 October 1667
Other legislation
Relates to	Great Level of the Fens Drainage Act 1660; Great Level of the Fens Drainage Act 1661; Bedford Level Act 1663; Bedford Level Act 1685

Status: Current legislation

Text of statute as originally enacted

Bedford Level Act 1685
- Act of Parliament
- Parliament of England
- Long title: An Act for repealing a Clause for dividing of Commons, in an Act of Parliament made in the 15th Year of King Charles the Second, intituled, "An Act for settling the Draining of the Great Level of the Fens, called Bedford Levell."
- Citation: 1 Ja. 2. c. 2 Pr.
- Territorial extent: England and Wales

Dates
- Royal assent: 27 June 1685
- Commencement: 19 May 1685
Other legislation
Amends	Bedford Level Act 1663
Relates to	Great Level of the Fens Drainage Act 1660; Great Level of the Fens Drainage Act 1661; Bedford Level Act 1667

Status: Current legislation

Following the restoration of Charles II in 1660, a series of local acts were passed to enable the project to advance.

The Bedford Level Corporation was created by the General Drainage Act 1663 (15 Cha. 2. c. 17) which received royal assent on 27 July 1663. The corporation's general objectives remained unchanged but its powers in respect of navigation rights and taxation were much improved. The organisation was to comprise a governor, six bailiffs, 20 conservators and the commonalty. The first meeting took place at the Fen Office in the Inner Temple, London on 1 August 1663, where the various official were elected.

The first governor was William Russell, 1st Duke of Bedford, son of the original Undertaker, who held the position until his death in 1700, when he was replaced by his grandson Wriothesley Russell, 2nd Duke of Bedford. On the 2nd Duke's death in 1711 the post devolved to his young son Wriothesley Russell, 3rd Duke of Bedford, a child of only 3 years of age, who nevertheless served as governor for 21 years, dying in 1732. He was followed by his younger brother, John Russell, 4th Duke of Bedford and on the 4th Duke's death in 1771 by the latter's 5 year old grandson Francis Russell, 5th Duke of Bedford, who then served for 31 years. He was succeeded in 1802 by his brother John Russell, 6th Duke of Bedford.

Some of the notable bailiffs were:

- Sir Richard Onslow, 1663–64
- Arthur Annesley, 1st Earl of Anglesey, 1664–65, 1679–86
- Thomas Colepeper, 2nd Baron Colepeper, 1665–66, 1667–68
- John Belasyse, 1st Baron Belasyse, 1668–69
- Samuel Fortrey, 1674–82
- Sir Thomas Willys, 1st Baronet, 1694–1700
- Sir Roger Jenyns, 1712–25
- Henry Clinton, 7th Earl of Lincoln, 1724–28
- Joseph Micklethwaite, 1st Viscount Micklethwaite, 1728–29
- George Townshend, 4th Viscount Townshend, 1739–43
- Henry, Earl of Lincoln, 1742–64
- John Montagu, 4th Earl of Sandwich, 1749–56
- Matthew Robinson, 2nd Baron Rokeby, 1756–63
- Francis Russell, Marquess of Tavistock, 1761–67
- Sampson Eardley, 1st Baron Eardley, 1767–1825
- Soame Jenyns, 1748–69, 1771–88
- Sir Charles Morgan, 1st Baronet, 1781–1807
- Sir Henry Peyton, 1st Baronet, 1787–89
- George Leonard Jenyns, 1798–
- Sir Charles Morgan, 2nd Baronet, 1807–27

== Work of the corporation ==
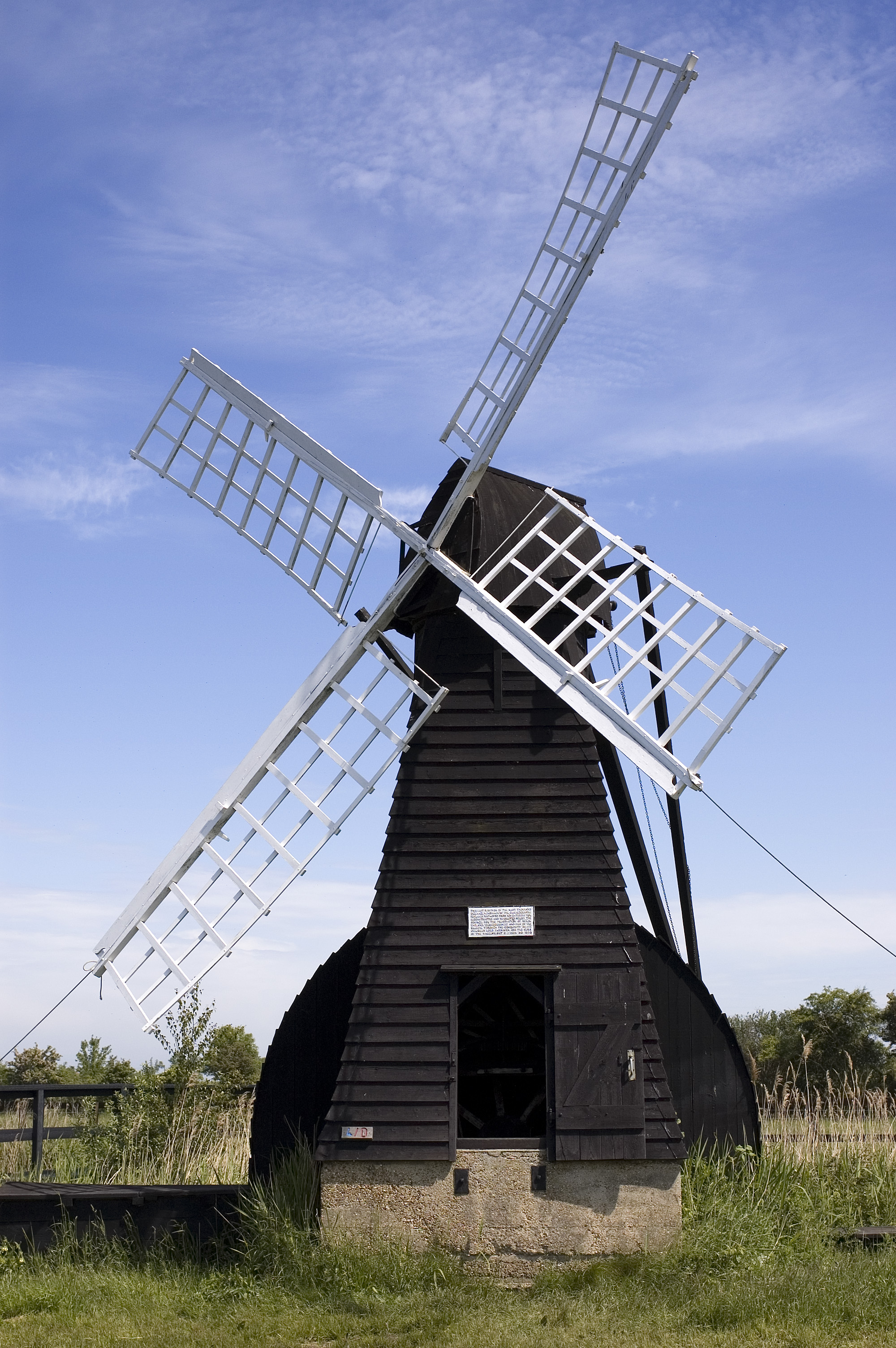
The windpump at Wicken Fen

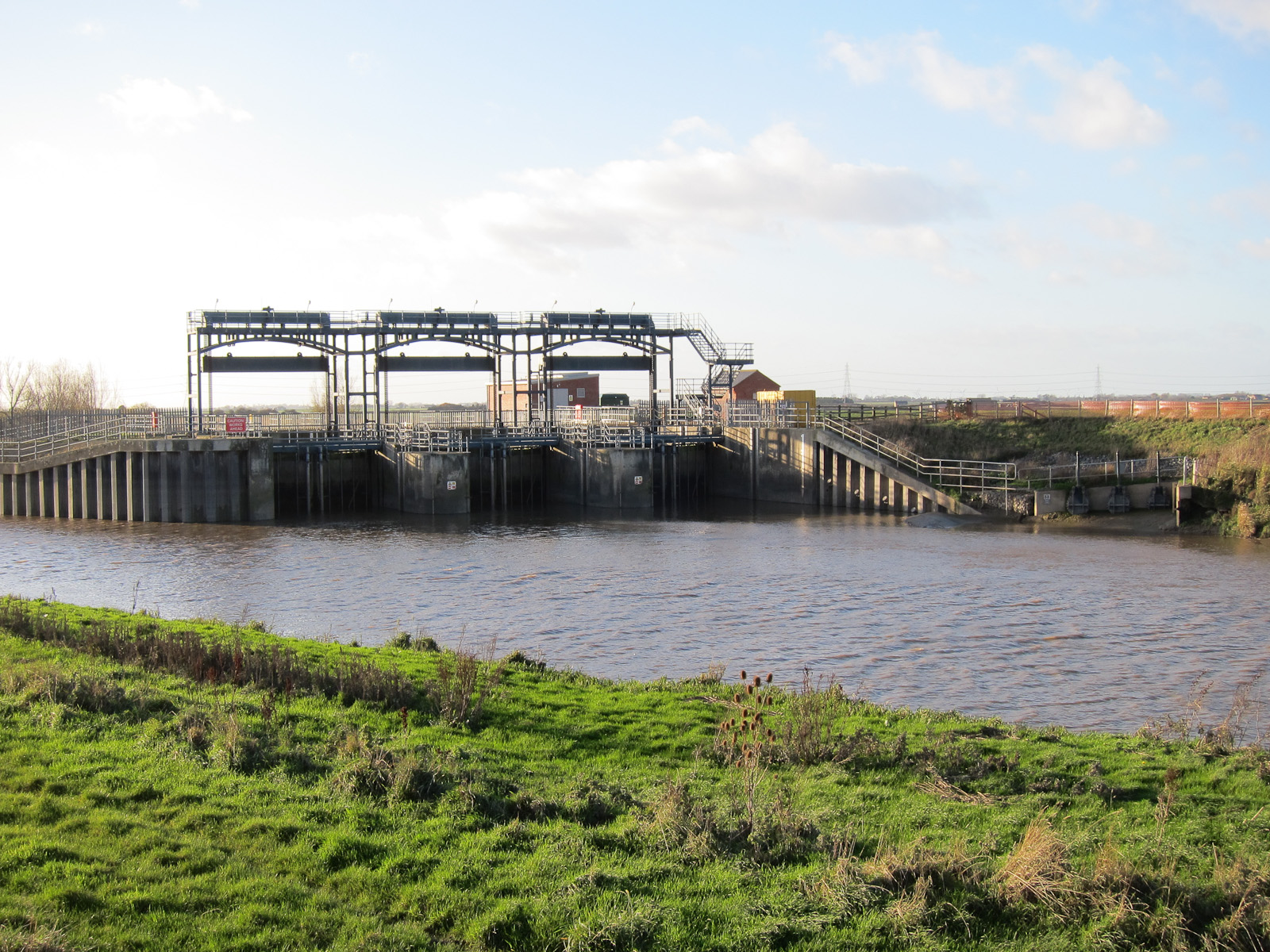
A typical Fenland sluice where the River Delph joins the New Bedford River

As the drainage succeeded in its general purpose, albeit with many technical difficulties, the level of the land sank as it dried out, negating the achievement. It was then decided to introduce several hundred windpumps to lift the water from the fields into the drainage ditches and rivers. The windpumps were replaced with first steam-powered and later diesel-powered pumps.

The system also depended on a number of sluices (locks) to prevent flooding at high tide or to control the flow of water within the system. These required constant maintenance and repair. Other ongoing problems concerned silting and navigation issues such as towpaths and access.

== Relocation and devolution of the corporation ==
In 1843 the corporation's headquarters were moved to Bedford House, Ely. The three original divisions became self-governing:

- North Level (1858)
- Middle Level (1862)
- South Level

The corporation's powers and responsibilities gradually reduced until in 1920 it was finally wound up when its powers and responsibilities were transferred to the Ouse Drainage Board. This in turn became part of the River Great Ouse Catchment Board in 1930.

== See also ==
- Bedford Level experiment
- Internal drainage board
- Middle Level Navigations - Middle Level waterways
- Prickwillow Museum - Museum of Fenland drainage
