= John Appold =

British dyer and engineer

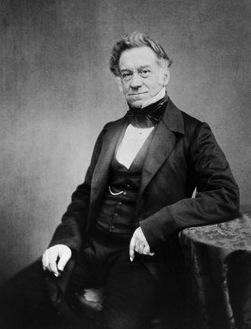

John George Appold, FRS (14 April 1800, in Shoreditch, London – 31 August 1865, in Gloucestershire) was a British fur dyer and engineer.

== Biography ==
Appold was the son of a fur-skin dyer, established in Finsbury. Succeeding to his father's business at the age of twenty-two, he introduced into it so many scientific improvements that he soon amassed a considerable fortune and was able to devote his time and attention to his favourite mechanical pursuits. His inventions, though numerous and evincing very great ingenuity, were not of the very highest class.

Perhaps the most important of them was his centrifugal pump. This procured him a 'council medal' at the Great Exhibition at the Crystal Palace in 1851, and it is highly commended in the report of the juries on that exhibition. Appold's pump with curved blades showed an efficiency of 68%, more than three times better than any of the other pumps present. It should be mentioned that the medal was for the special form of pump, the principle having been known and acted upon many years before.

Another invention of considerable value was a brake, employed in laying deep-sea telegraph cables. This apparatus was used in laying the first Transatlantic cable in 1858. Appold was very liberal in communicating his ideas to others. He was on terms of friendship with many of the chief engineers of his time, and was consulted by them frequently with advantage. He patented but few of his ideas, preferring generally to give them freely to the public.

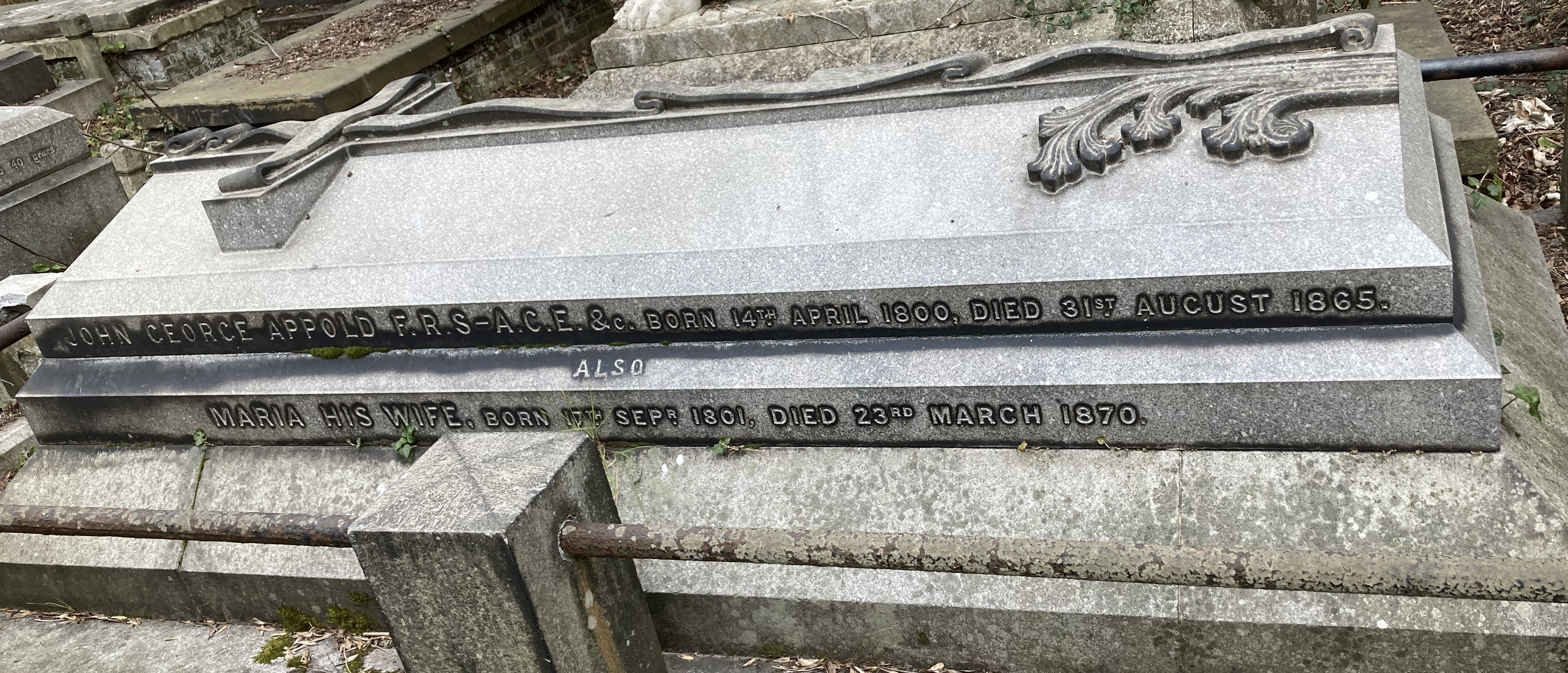
Grave of John Appold in West Norwood Cemetery

His house was a museum of mechanical contrivances, such as doors which opened at a person's approach, and shutters which closed at the touch of a spring, while the same movement turned on and lighted the gas. Probably, had he been compelled to rely for his support on his mechanical talents, his inventions would have been further developed, and have been brought more prominently into notice than they were. As it was, he was a man of high reputation among his contemporaries, who left behind him but little to keep his name from forgetfulness.

He is commemorated with a memorial tablet inside St Leonard's, Shoreditch and buried at West Norwood Cemetery.
