= Vernatti baronets =

Dormant baronetcy in the Baronetage of Nova Scotia

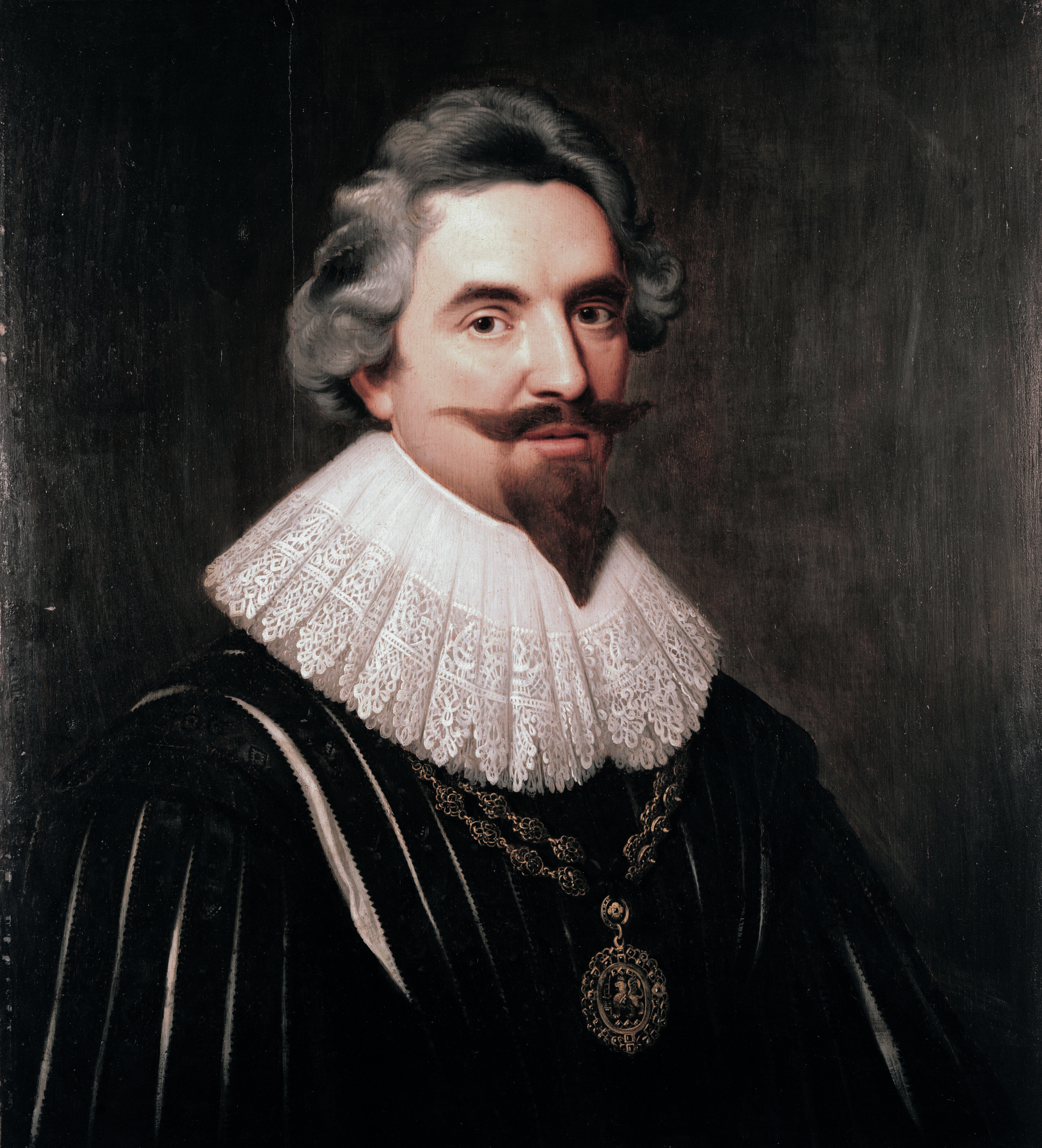
Philibert Vernatti (1590–1643) (Michiel van Mierevelt)

The Vernatti Baronetcy, of Carleton in the County of York, was a title in the Baronetage of Nova Scotia. It was created on 7 June 1643 for Philibert Vernatti. Vernatti was one of the adventurers who invested in the draining of the Fens and a drainage channel in south Lincolnshire running from Pode Hole to below Spalding, is still known as Vernatt's Drain.

The title is presumed to have become dormant on the death of the second Baronet some time after 1678.

== Vernatti baronets, of Carleton (1643) ==
- Sir Philibert Vernatti, 1st Baronet (died 1643)
- Sir Louis Philibert Vernatti, 2nd Baronet (died after 1678)
