= Outwell =

Village in Norfolk, England

Coordinates: 52.61785°N 0.23157°E

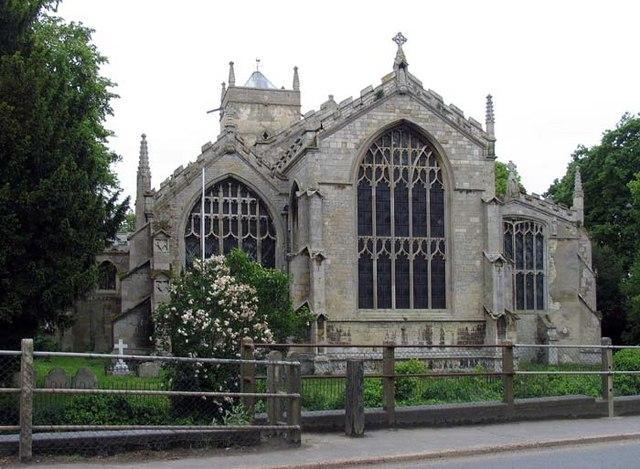
- Saint Clement's, Outwell

- Location within Norfolk
- Area: 12.21 km^{2} (4.71 sq mi)
- Population: 2,083 (2011)
  - Density: 171/km^{2} (440/sq mi)
- OS grid reference: TF5103
  - London: 97 miles (156 km) SSW
- Civil parish: Outwell
- District: King's Lynn and West Norfolk
- Shire county: Norfolk
- Region: East
- Country: England
- Sovereign state: United Kingdom
- Post town: WISBECH
- Postcode district: PE14
- Dialling code: 01945
- Police: Norfolk
- Fire: Norfolk
- Ambulance: East of England
- UK Parliament: South West Norfolk

Outwell is a village and civil parish in the borough of King's Lynn and West Norfolk, in the English county of Norfolk.

At the 2011 Census, the parish had a population of 2,083, an increase from 1,880 at the 2001 Census.

== History ==
According to A Dictionary of British Place Names, derives from the Old English 'wella', meaning "a place at the spring or stream", combined with 'ūte', meaning "outer [or] lower downstream", distinguishing the place from Upwell, which is 1 mile (1.6 km) to the south. In 963 the settlement was referred to as 'Wellan', and in the 1086 Domesday Book, 'Utuuella'. Molycourt Priory in the parish dated from before the Norman Conquest of 1066, becoming a cell of Ely Cathedral and surviving until the Dissolution of the Monasteries.

Outwell has an entry in the Domesday Book of 1086. The parish was in the custody William de Warenne. The survey also records 16 bordars with lands worth 5s. as belonging to Saint Benedict's Abbey in Ramsey.

There was a Village lock-up until c.1871 when it was sold to Mr Elworthy for £19.

=== Drainage and flooding ===
In the Middle Ages the River Nene determined the layout of Outwell. Since that time, the landscape of the whole district has consequently been much altered by the construction of several large drains which run through the parish. In the 17th century Popham's Eau was cut to provide a conduit for the waters of the old River Nene into the River Great Ouse at Salter's Lode. This was followed by many alterations and new drains being dug. In May 1862 one sixth of the Parish of Outwell was inundated with water when the Middle Level Drain burst through its banks. It took three years before the area had fully recovered from the flood. Also constructed across the parish was the Wisbech Canal, now disused, which followed the course of the Well Stream as far as Outwell church and then struck across in a southeasterly direction to join Popham's Eau at Nordelph.

One benefit of the drains, washes and other watercourse around the Fens is the sport of Fen skating. During the cold winters of the 1820s and 1830s there were a number of fenmen who made a name for themselves as skaters, such as James May of Upwell.

=== Beaupré Hall ===
Beaupré Hall was a large 16th-century manor house on the outskirts of Outwell, built by the Beaupre family, who also financed Catholic chapels attached to the church at Outwell. It was later lived in by Robert Bell during the reign of Elizabeth I. In decline since the Victorian era, during the First World War, the hall was commandeered by the RAF and later used for holiday housing. Following this the Hall fell into a state of further disrepair until its demolition in 1966.

== Geography ==
The village is 45 miles (70 km) west of Norwich, 12 miles (20 km) south-west of King's Lynn and 80 miles (100 km) north of London; the nearest town is Wisbech, which is 5 miles (8 km) north-west of the village.

Outwell is on the route of the A1101 road, close to the A47. The nearest railway station is Downham Market on the Fen Line between King's Lynn and Cambridge, and the nearest airport is Norwich Airport.

The village and parish of Outwell is on the western edge of the county of Norfolk which borders Cambridgeshire. Until 1990 Outwell parish was split with half in Norfolk and half in Cambridgeshire with the boundary falling along the old course of the River Nene. The boundary also cut straight through the middle of the village. In 1935 the part of Outwell which was in Cambridgeshire was reduced in size to enlarge the nearby village of Emneth. Outwell parish today is part of the King's Lynn and West Norfolk local government district.

The village and parish is traversed by drainage channels which characterize this part of Fenland Norfolk. The eastern corner of the parish is cut north to south by the Middle Level main Drain. Crossing the parish from east to west is the Well Creek drain. The north and eastern parts of the parish consist of arable and pasture fields, the eastern area referred to as Walsingham Fens and the north area as Well Moors. On the edges of the village there is a small amount of woodland near Birdbeck Field and to the south and at Church Field to the east.

== Notable people ==
- Sir Robert Bell (1539–1577), MP, Speaker of the House of Commons, lord Chief Baron of the Exchequer.
- Sir Edmond Bell MP, (son of Sir Robert Bell MP), MP for Aldborough in Queen Elizabeth's parliament.
- Sir Robert Bell MP, lived at the hall and MP for Norfolk in 1626.
- Beaupre Bell, High Sheriff of Norfolk. Son of Francis & Dorothy Bell. Buried in St Mary's chapel, Outwell.
