= Adventurers (land drainage) =

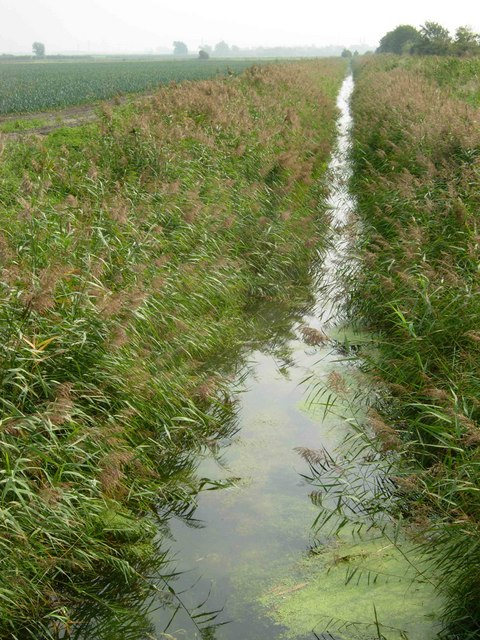
"Adventurers' Fen" near to Upware, Cambridgeshire, preserves the name of the builders of the drainage channel.

Adventurers were groups of English engineers and wealthy landowners, who funded large-scale land drainage projects in the seventeenth century, in return for rights to some of the land reclaimed.

== History ==
=== Background ===
Land drainage works were expensive, and were usually undertaken in sparsely populated areas. In the seventeenth century a number of such schemes were carried out by Adventurers, who acted under parliamentary sanction, but who financed the works themselves. In return, they gained rights to the land reclaimed as a result of the civil engineering works.

=== Bedford Level scheme ===
Map of The Fens (Lincolnshire, Cambridgeshire, Norfolk, Suffolk), with drainage channels shown by dotted lines.

One such scheme was the draining of the Bedford Levels. The Bedford Level Corporation was in charge of the works, which when conceived in 1630, would create large tracts of "summer lands", which would be suitable for grazing during the summer months, but would still be liable to flooding in the winter. Funds for the work were provided by the Earl of Bedford and thirteen other Adventurers. Of the land reclaimed, the fourteen men were to receive 43,000 acres (170 km^{2}), to be shared between them, while 12,000 acres (49 km^{2}) were to be given to the king, and another 40,000 acres (160 km^{2}) were designated to provide income to maintain the works once they were completed. The Dutch engineer Cornelius Vermuyden was employed to carry out the work, and on 12 October 1637, it was judged to be complete, when the Court of Sewers met at St Ives. However, there was dissatisfaction with the decision, and the Royal Commission of Sewers overturned it in 1639, when they met at Huntingdon. An Act of Parliament passed in 1649 authorised the fifth Earl of Bedford to carry out further work, so that the land could be used throughout the year for agriculture. Another Act followed in 1660, but after initial improvements, the schemes gradually deteriorated, and the Bedford Level Corporation found it increasingly difficult to find anyone prepared to invest their money, when the outcome was so full of risk.

=== Other schemes and opposition ===
As well as the engineering challenges faced by the Adventurers, there was also opposition from those who judged that their livelihood was affected by the works. In 1631, a group of Adventurers led by Sir Anthony Thomas were authorised to drain the East Fen, the West Fen and the Wildmore Fen, to the north and west of Boston, Lincolnshire. They spent some £30,000 on the work, and received 16,300 acres (66 km^{2}) of the drained land. They subsequently spent £20,000 on improvements and buildings, and the land generated some £8,000 per year in rent. The land had previously been extra-parochial, on which people from adjacent villages had grazing rights. After seven years, the Commoners rioted in 1642, breaking down the sluices, destroying crops, and demolishing houses. The Adventurers took their case to the House of Lords, who passed a bill for the "relief and security of the drainers", but the House of Commons were less supportive, refusing to take sides. They ordered that the Sheriff and the local Justices of the Peace should act to prevent and suppress riots. The Commoners then took their grievances to court, and won. The outcome was that when the monarchy was restored in 1661, management of the Fens returned to the Court of Sewers, and remained in a poor state until the mid eighteenth century.

To the south of Boston, the Earl of Lindsay and another group of Adventurers faced similar problems. Having reached an agreement with the Court of Sewers, they worked on draining the Lindsay Levels, the main feature of which was the South Forty-Foot Drain, running for 24 miles (39 km) from Bourne to Boston. The land reclaimed was suitable for agriculture, and in 1636 they took possession of it, building houses and growing crops. Again, Commoners and Fenmen felt that they had been dispossessed, and attempted to get Parliament to rule in their favour. After three years, they gave up their attempts at a legal solution, and took direct action, destroying the drains, buildings and crops. In the political turmoil of the time, just prior to the start of the Civil War, the Adventurers received no compensation for their loss.

== See also ==
- Land reclamation
- Twenty, Lincolnshire
- Witham Navigable Drains
- Bedford Level Corporation

== Bibliography ==
- Barton, Barry M J (August 2011). "John Rennie and the drainage of the Witham Fens, Lincolnshire, UK". Proceedings of the Institution of Civil Engineers - Engineering History and Heritage. Engineering History and Heritage. 163 (EH3). Institution of Civil Engineers: 175–187. doi:10.1680/ehah.2011.164.3.175. ISSN 1757-9430.
- Darby, H C (1956). The Drainage of the Fens. Cambridge University Press. ISBN 978-1-107-40298-0.
- Hills, Richard L (2008). The Drainage of the Fens. Landmark Publishing. ISBN 978-1-84306-323-0.
- Wheeler, William Henry; Batty, Leonard Charles (1896). A History of the Fens of South Lincolnshire. British Library Historical Print Collections. ISBN 978-1-241-32839-9.
