= Wiggenhall St Germans SSSI =

UK Site of Special Scientific Interest

Coordinates: 52.699°N 0.349°E

- Site of Special Scientific Interest
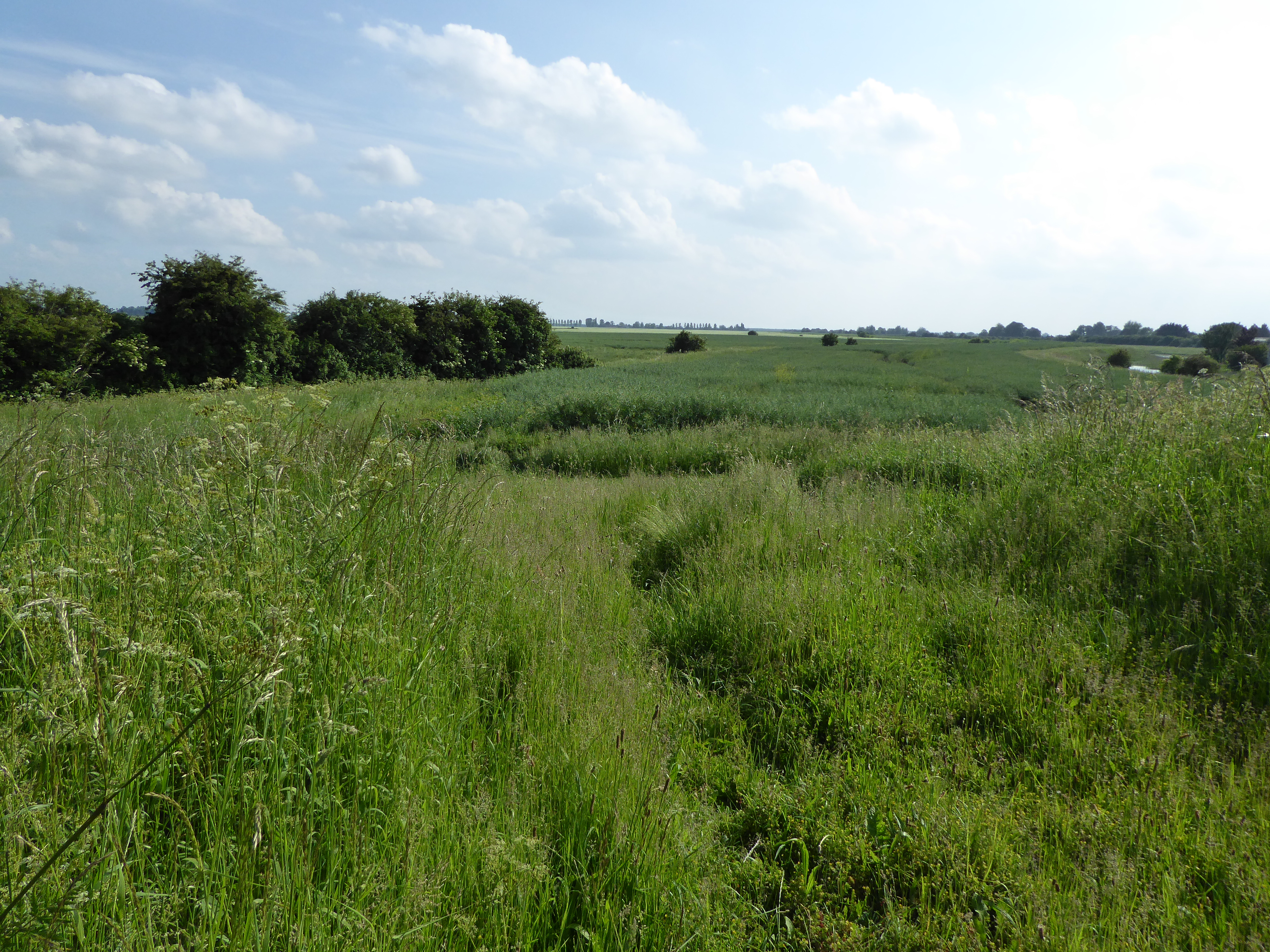
- Location of Wiggenhall St Germans SSSI.
- Area of search: Norfolk, England
- Grid reference: TF 588 138
- Interest: Geological
- Area: 5.2 hectares (13 acres)
- Notification date: 1992
- Location map: Magic Map

Wiggenhall St Germans SSSI is a 5.2-hectare (13-acre) geological Site of Special Scientific Interest south of King's Lynn in Norfolk, England. It is a Geological Conservation Review site.

This site provides evidence for sea level changes during the Quaternary period, the last 2.6 million years. There are three peat layers, interspersed with fine-grained clastic rocks, and they have been studied with pollen and foraminifera analyses.

A public footpath crosses the site.
