= Wiggenhall St Germans =

Village in Norfolk, England

Coordinates: 52.700°N 0.360°E

Wiggenhall St Germans: North Wiggenhall
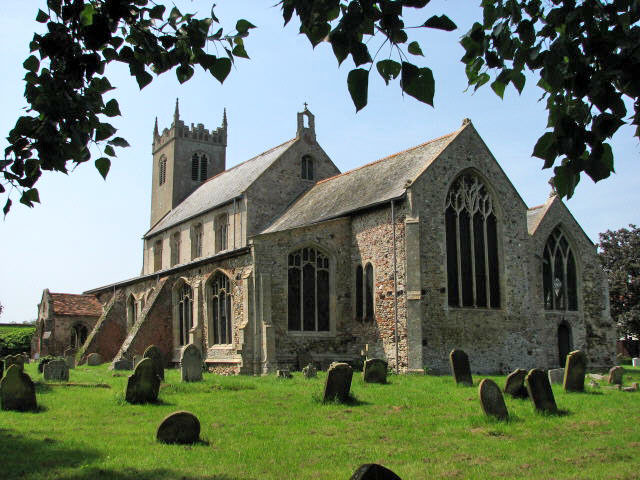
- St German's church, Wiggenhall

- Location within Norfolk
- Area: 18.98 km^{2} (7.33 sq mi)
- Population: 1,373 (2011)
  - Density: 72/km^{2} (190/sq mi)
- OS grid reference: TF596141
  - London: 136 km (85 mi) WbS
- Civil parish: Wiggenhall St Germans
- District: West Norfolk
- Shire county: Norfolk
- Region: East
- Country: England
- Sovereign state: United Kingdom
- Post town: King's Lynn
- Postcode district: PE34
- Dialling code: 01553
- Police: Norfolk
- Fire: Norfolk
- Ambulance: East of England
- UK Parliament: South West Norfolk
- Website: Wiggenhall St Germans Parish Council

Wiggenhall St Germans is a village and civil parish in the English county of Norfolk in the East of England. It is 85 miles (137 km) north of London and 5 miles (8.0 km) south-west of King's Lynn. The parish covers an area of 18.98 km^{2} (7.33 sq mi) and had a population of 1,373 in 554 households at the 2011 census.

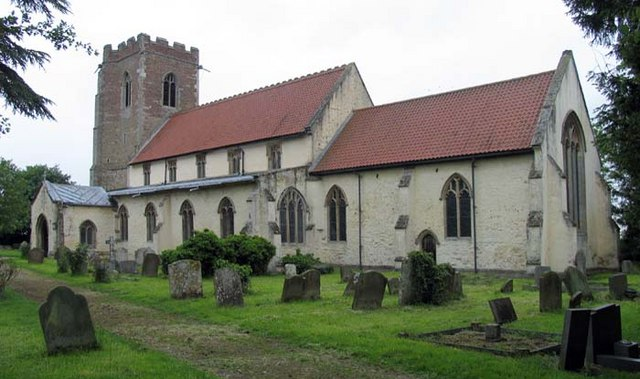
St Mary the Virgin's Church, Wiggenhall

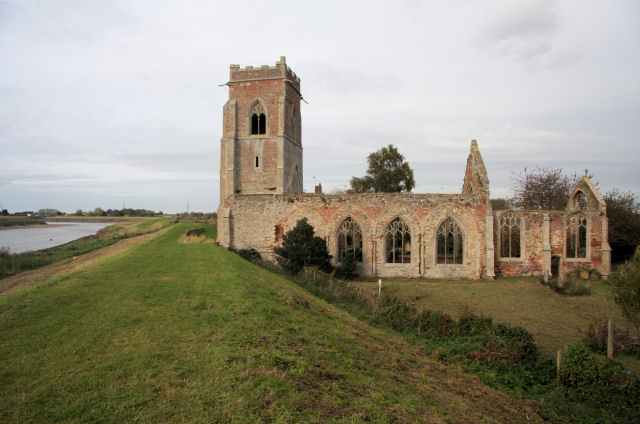
Ruined church of Wiggenhall St Peter beside the River Great Ouse

The parish is on the River Great Ouse which divides the village into two. Most of the parish lies below the high-water mark and some areas are level with the bed of the river, which is confined by high banks. The parish includes the hamlets of Wiggenhall St Mary the Virgin and Wiggenhall St Peter, and the settlements of Eau Brink and Saddlebow (Saddle Bow on some maps).

== History ==
The village's name means 'Wicga's nook of land'.

An estate just south of the village was the site of Fitton, the ancient seat of the Howard family, later the dukes of Norfolk; their former hall of 1570–77 is now the Grade II* listed building called Fitton Oake.

During the Second World War, two Hawker Hurricanes collided over the parish. The crash site was investigated by a local aviation society and a book published.

== Governance ==
Wiggenhall St Germans is part of the electoral ward called Wiggenhall. The population of this ward at the 2011 Census was 2,102.

== Amenities ==
The village has a primary school, St Germans Academy.

St German's Church is a Grade I listed building. St Mary the Virgin's Church, also Grade I, is under the care of the Churches Conservation Trust. The ruined St Peter's Church is a Grade II* listed building.

== See also ==
- Wiggenhall St Germans SSSI
- Wiggenhall St Mary Magdalen
- St Germain's railway station
