= List of Ramsar sites in England =

This list of Ramsar sites in England includes wetlands that are considered to be of international importance under the Ramsar Convention. England currently has 71 sites designated as "Wetlands of International Importance". For a full list of all Ramsar sites worldwide, see List of Ramsar wetlands of international importance.

== List of Ramsar Sites ==
Name	Location	Area (km^{2})	Designated	Description	Image
Abberton Reservoir	Essex; 51°49′N 0°52′E	7.26	24 July 1981	An artificial body of water with populations of golden plover, gadwall, shoveller, teal and cormorants.	
Alde–Ore Estuary	Suffolk; 52°5′N 1°33′E	25.47	4 October 1996		
River Arun	West Sussex	52.9	16 December 1999		
Avon Valley	Hampshire	13.85	2 February 1998		
Benfleet and Southend Marshes	Essex	22.51	14 February 1994		
Blackwater Estuary	Essex	43.95	11 March 1992		
Breydon Water	Norfolk	12.03	29 March 1996		
Broadland	Norfolk	46.23	6 January 1976		
Chesil Beach and The Fleet	Dorset	7.48	17 July 1985		
Chichester and Langstone Harbours	West Sussex / Hampshire	58.1	28 October 1987		
Chippenham Fen	Cambridgeshire	1.12	11 March 1992		
Colne Estuary (Mid-Essex Coast Phase 2)	Essex Coast	27.01	28 July 1994		
Crouch and Roach Estuaries (Mid-Essex Coast Phase 3)	Essex Coast	17.36	24 March 1995		
Deben Estuary SSSI	Suffolk	9.79	11 March 1996		
The Dee Estuary	Cheshire, Flintshire	131.31	17 July 1985		
Dengie (Mid-Essex Coast Phase 1)	Essex Coast	31.27	24 March 1994		
Dersingham Bog	Norfolk	1.58	12 September 1995		
Dorset Heathlands	Dorset	67.3	1 October 1998		
Duddon Estuary	Cumbria	68.06	16 March 1998		
Esthwaite Water	Cumbria	1.37	7 November 1991		
Exe Estuary	Devon	23.46	11 March 1992		
Foulness (Mid-Essex Coast Phase 5)	Essex Coast	109.33	4 October 1996		
Gibraltar Point	Lincolnshire	4.14	5 March 1993		
Hamford Water	Essex	21.87	8 June 1993		
Holburn Lake and Moss	Northumberland	0.28	17 July 1985		
Humber Estuary	Lincolnshire, Yorkshire	379.88	28 July 1994		
Irthinghead Mires	Cumbria, Northumberland	7.92	17 July 1985		
Isles of Scilly		40.2	13 August 2001		
Lea Valley	Greater London, Hertfordshire	44.8	9 October 2000		
Leighton Moss	Lancashire	1.29	28 November 1985		
Lindisfarne	Northumberland	36.79	5 January 1976		
Lower Derwent Valley	Yorkshire	9.15	17 July 1985		
Malham Tarn	North Yorkshire	2.86	28 October 1993		
Martin Mere	Lancashire	1.2	28 November 1985		
Medway Estuary and Marshes	Kent	46.97	15 December 1993		
Mersey Estuary	Cheshire, Merseyside, Lancashire	50.33	20 December 1995		
Midland Meres and Mosses (Phase 1)		5.11	9 May 1994		
Midland Meres and Mosses (Phase 2)		15.88	2 February 1997		
Minsmere-Walberswick	Suffolk	20.19	5 January 1976		
Morecambe Bay	Cumbria, Lancashire	374.05	4 October 1996		
Nene Washes	Cambridgeshire	15.17	5 March 1993		
The New Forest	Hampshire	16.12	22 September 1993		
North Norfolk Coast	Norfolk	78.87	5 January 1976		
Northumbria Coast	Northumberland	11.08	2 February 2000		
Ouse Washes	Cambridgeshire, Norfolk	24.69	5 January 1976		
Pagham Harbour	West Sussex	6.37	30 March 1988		
Pevensey Levels	East Sussex	35.78	2 February 1999		
Poole Harbour	Dorset	24.39	22 July 1999		
Portsmouth Harbour	Hampshire	12.49	28 February 1995		
Redgrave and South Lopham Fens	Norfolk, Suffolk	1.27	15 February 1991		
Ribble and Alt Estuaries	Lancashire	134.64	28 November 1985		
Rostherne Mere	Cheshire	0.8	24 July 1981		
Roydon Common	Norfolk	1.94	5 March 1993		
Rutland Water	Rutland	13.6	4 October 1991		
Severn Estuary	Gloucestershire, Monmouthshire, Somerset	247.01	5 January 1976		
Solent and Southampton Water	Hampshire	54.15	1 October 1998		
Somerset Levels and Moors	Somerset	63.88	26 June 1997		
South West London Waterbodies		82.8	9 October 2000		
Stodmarsh	Kent	4.81	16 December 1993		
Stour and Orwell Estuaries	Suffolk	33.24	13 July 1994		
The Swale	Kent	65.15	17 July 1985		
Teesmouth and Cleveland Coast	Cleveland	12.47	15 August 1995		
Thames Estuary and Marshes	Essex, Kent	55.89	5 May 2000		
Thanet Coast and Sandwich Bay	Kent	21.69	28 July 1994		
Thursley and Ockley Bog	Surrey	2.65	14 February 1994		
Upper Nene Valley Gravel Pits	Northamptonshire	2.65	7 April 2011		
Upper Solway Flats and Marshes	Surrey	2.65	1 October 1986		
Walmore Common	Gloucestershire	0.53	5 December 1991		
The Wash	Norfolk, Lincolnshire	622.12	30 March 1988		
Wicken Fen	Cambridgeshire	2.54	12 September 1995		
Woodwalton Fen	Cambridgeshire	2.08	12 September 1995		

== See also ==
- Ramsar Convention
- List of Ramsar sites worldwide
