= Ouse Washes Landscape Partnership =

The Ouse Washes Landscape Partnership scheme (OWLP) is a 3-year project supported by the Heritage Lottery Fund which runs from 2014 - 2017. The scheme focuses on the promotion of the area surrounding the Ouse Washes, the heart of the Cambridgeshire and Norfolk Fens, and on encouraging community engagement with the area's diverse heritage.

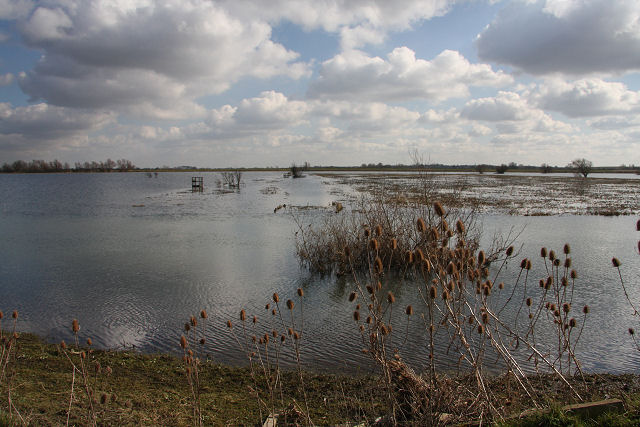
The Ouse Washes between the Old and New Bedford River

A Landscape Partnership scheme (LP) is a Heritage Lottery Fund grant-aided programme which is delivered in a partnership made up of local, regional and national organisations with an interest in an area. The main aim of such schemes is to conserve the UK's distinctive landscape character areas. A Landscape Partnership is based around a portfolio of smaller projects, which together provide long-term social, economic and environmental benefits for the landscape and its communities. These projects focus on the following outcomes:

- Conserving or restoring the built and natural features that create the historic landscape character;
- Increasing community participation;
- Increasing access and learning about the landscape;
- Increasing training opportunities in local heritage skills.

The area targeted by the OWLP scheme focuses on the distinctive rural, open and tranquil landscape surrounding the Ouse Washes; this landscape includes important wetland and washland habitats set within productive agricultural land. The project focuses on the area around the Old Bedford River and New Bedford River in the Cambridgeshire and Norfolk Fens and includes the RSPB nature reserves to its south, near St Ives and Fen Drayton. This unique landscape area includes or abuts a large number of vibrant small settlements and is close to the market towns and cities of Downham Market, Chatteris, March, Littleport, Ely, Cambridge and St. Ives.

The Ouse Washes Landscape Partnership brings together 28 organisations with interests in the area. It aims to improve cooperation among them and involve local communities in decisions about the landscape. The scheme also seeks to attract visitors to the Ouse Washes area.
