= Mepal =

Village in Cambridgeshire, England

Coordinates: 52.406°N 0.117°E

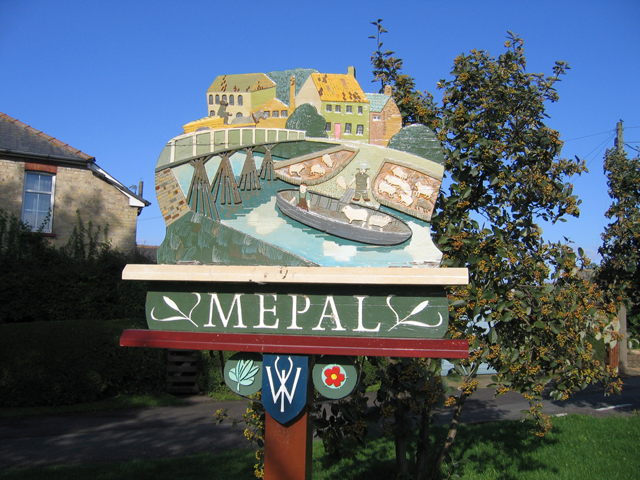
- Mepal's village sign, showing Cornelius Vermuyden's wooden bridge, and sheep being transported by boat

- Location within Cambridgeshire
- Population: 976 (2021)
- OS grid reference: TL441808
- Shire county: Cambridgeshire
- Region: East
- Country: England
- Sovereign state: United Kingdom
- Post town: ELY
- Postcode district: CB6
- Dialling code: 01353

Mepal /ˈmiːpəl/ is a village in Cambridgeshire, England. Mepal is part of the East Cambridgeshire district, and is located just north of the A142 road between Ely and Chatteris. First listed as Mepahala in the 12th century, the village name meant 'Nook of land of a man named Mēapa' in Old English.

== History ==
Mepal's history has always been tied up with that of The Fens and the village is less than ten metres above sea level. One of the smaller villages of the Isle of Ely, Mepal lies at the western end of the Isle on what was once the shore between the fenland and the higher ground of the Isle.

The Old Bedford River and the New Bedford River (also known as the Hundred Foot Drain) run very close on the northwestern side of the village, and the only important bridges of the rivers are found in Mepal. The old and new rivers, originally modified by the Victorians, offer the main drainage route for the Fens and retain a major flood plain between the two river beds. The flood plain typically floods between November and March of each year.

A major fire devastated the village in the 19th century, leading to a drop in population from 510 to 397 between 1861 and 1871. There are thus very few remaining buildings dating from before the 19th century.

== RAF Mepal ==
Mepal retains the historical pride of being the home of No. 75 Squadron RAF, which was operational between 1943 and 1945. It held the enviable post of being the prior home to No. 75 'New Zealand' Squadron which was equipped with Lancaster bombers. 75 Squadron flew the highest total operations for the whole of RAF Bomber Command, 8017 in total. Mepal is visited on an annual basis by previous members of the Squadron and their families, as part of remembrance. A museum jointly dedicated to RAF Mepal and RAF Witchford is located in the nearby village of Witchford.

After the Second World War, RAF Mepal was selected in 1957 as a site for deploying Thor medium-range nuclear missiles, although these were removed by 1963. The airfield was subsequently decommissioned and the land sold off.

== Climate ==
Mepal experiences an oceanic (Cfb) climate, much like the rest of England.

Temperature extremes range from a high of 35.9 °C (96.6 °F) on 10 August 2003, to a low of −16.1 °C (3.0 °F) on 14 January 1982.

Mepal holds the record for the warmest March temperature ever recorded in the UK, a high of 25.6 °C (78.1 °F) on 29 March 1968.

Climate data for Mepal (1991-2020 normals, extremes 1967-2005)
Month	Jan	Feb	Mar	Apr	May	Jun	Jul	Aug	Sep	Oct	Nov	Dec	Year
Record high °C (°F)	15.1 (59.2)	18.2 (64.8)	25.6 (78.1)	26.1 (79.0)	29.9 (85.8)	33.4 (92.1)	34.0 (93.2)	35.9 (96.6)	30.3 (86.5)	28.4 (83.1)	18.6 (65.5)	15.8 (60.4)	35.9 (96.6)
Mean daily maximum °C (°F)	7.6 (45.7)	8.5 (47.3)	11.2 (52.2)	14.3 (57.7)	17.7 (63.9)	20.4 (68.7)	23.0 (73.4)	22.9 (73.2)	19.8 (67.6)	15.4 (59.7)	10.7 (51.3)	7.8 (46.0)	15.0 (59.0)
Daily mean °C (°F)	4.5 (40.1)	4.9 (40.8)	6.9 (44.4)	9.3 (48.7)	12.4 (54.3)	15.2 (59.4)	17.5 (63.5)	17.3 (63.1)	14.7 (58.5)	11.2 (52.2)	7.3 (45.1)	4.8 (40.6)	10.5 (50.9)
Mean daily minimum °C (°F)	1.5 (34.7)	1.4 (34.5)	2.7 (36.9)	4.3 (39.7)	7.1 (44.8)	10.0 (50.0)	11.9 (53.4)	11.7 (53.1)	9.6 (49.3)	7.1 (44.8)	3.9 (39.0)	1.7 (35.1)	6.1 (43.0)
Record low °C (°F)	−16.1 (3.0)	−12.7 (9.1)	−7.8 (18.0)	−7.2 (19.0)	−4.5 (23.9)	−0.7 (30.7)	2.6 (36.7)	1.6 (34.9)	−2.2 (28.0)	−6.6 (20.1)	−11.5 (11.3)	−15.0 (5.0)	−16.1 (3.0)
Average precipitation mm (inches)	48.5 (1.91)	34.4 (1.35)	34.3 (1.35)	37.1 (1.46)	43.3 (1.70)	56.5 (2.22)	52.0 (2.05)	58.0 (2.28)	50.6 (1.99)	61.3 (2.41)	55.9 (2.20)	51.5 (2.03)	583.3 (22.96)
Average precipitation days (≥ 1.0 mm)	10.2	8.6	8.0	8.2	8.1	9.1	8.6	9.2	8.1	10.0	10.2	10.3	108.4
Mean monthly sunshine hours	58.4	79.8	112.3	157.8	195.7	190.0	199.0	184.5	143.2	108.5	66.1	54.7	1,549.9
Source 1: Met Office
Source 2: Starlings Roost Weather

== Church ==
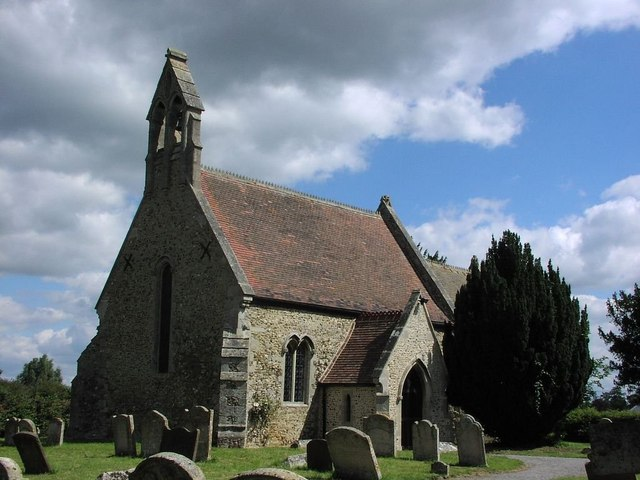
St Mary's Church, Mepal

The parish church, dedicated to Saint Mary, mother of Jesus, and a Grade II* listed building, dates from the 13th century and has been largely unaltered since. It is notable as the only church in the Isle of Ely without either tower or spire, having a double bellcote instead. The building is listed in Nikolaus Pevsner's Buildings of England, Cambridgeshire Vol. IV.

Kelly's Directory, a trade directory set up in 1835, wrote that the church features "inscriptions on the tomb of Alan de Walsingham, sub-prior and sacristan of Ely Cathedral, to the church of Ely, is a building of flint and stone in the Early English style, consisting of chancel, nave, south porch and a western turret containing one bell. The chancel was restored by the Rev. Charles S. Harris LL.M. rector (1876-84), and the church in 1905 at a cost of £600. In 1908, the interior was reseated and a vestry added at a cost of £200: there are 100 sittings. The register dates from the year 1559."

== Village life ==
The village of Mepal retains a hotel, restaurant and bar (The Three Pickerels), a post office/village shop, and a Church of England primary school rated 'Good' by Ofsted in 2023. Mepal Village Hall was built in 1873-74 as Mepal National School and saw its first pupils on 4th May 1874. The Hall also functions as a polling station. There is a local football club shared between Mepal and Sutton, a youth club, and Friendship club. Allotments, rented out by the Mepal parish council, are located by the village children's play park.

Former public houses include the Cross Keys, in which Clement Freud lived when he was Member of Parliament for the Isle of Ely in the 1970s and early 1980s.

From Monday to Saturday Mepal has a two-hourly bus service (no Sunday service) to Chatteris, Ely and Cambridge.

== Botanical ==
Adjacent to St Mary's church is a small woodland notable for the old elm trees, believed to be Plot elm hybrid.

== See also ==
- Cornelius Vermuyden
- Mepal Airfield
- Old Bedford River
- New Bedford River
