= Welney =

Village in Norfolk, England

Coordinates: 52.516°N 0.235°E

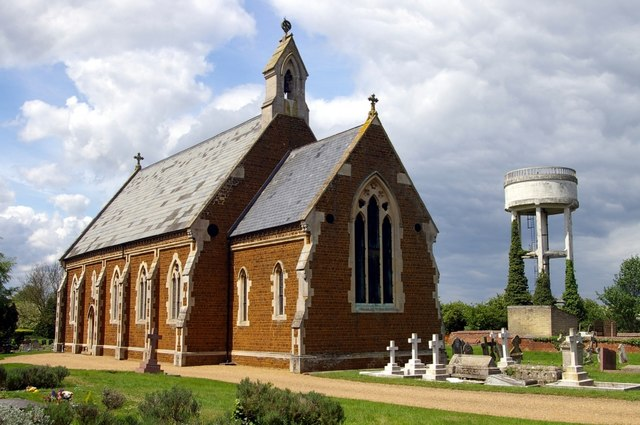
- St Mary's Church, Welney

- Location within Norfolk
- Area: 20.73 km^{2} (8.00 sq mi)
- Population: 542 (2011)
  - Density: 26/km^{2} (67/sq mi)
- OS grid reference: TL526940
- Civil parish: Welney
- District: King's Lynn and West Norfolk
- Shire county: Norfolk
- Region: East
- Country: England
- Sovereign state: United Kingdom
- Post town: WISBECH
- Postcode district: PE14
- Dialling code: 01354
- Police: Norfolk
- Fire: Norfolk
- Ambulance: East of England

Welney is a village and civil parish in the Fens of England and the county of Norfolk. The village is about 10 miles (16 km) south-west of the town of Downham Market, 20 miles (30 km) south of the town of King's Lynn and 45 miles (70 km) west of the city of Norwich. The county boundary with Cambridgeshire is adjacent, with the city of Cambridge 25 miles (40 km) to the south.

Welney is immediately to the west of the Old Bedford River, River Delph and New Bedford River, which are parallel channels and are here crossed by the A1101 road.

Welney is on the Ouse Washes, an area of wildlife conservation. WWT Welney, near the village, is a nature reserve in the care of the Wildfowl and Wetlands Trust. Nearby there are also the RSPB Ouse Washes, a reserve managed by the Royal Society for the Protection of Birds.

The parish covers an area of 8 square miles (20 km^{2}) and had a population of 528 in 217 households at the 2001 census, which had increased to 542 by the 2011 Census. For the purposes of local government the parish falls within the district of King's Lynn and West Norfolk.

== History ==
In the 14th century Welney was called Wellenhe, meaning ‘a river called Welle’ (the old name of the Old Croft River). In the 18th century Woad was grown in the parish. In 1820 a road was built from Welney across The Wash to the New Bedford River (also known as the Hundred Foot Drain), where a ferry-boat was established opposite the public house of Thomas Golding, formerly Washington's; this provided a direct route into Lincolnshire through Wisbech from Bury St Edmunds, Ely and Cambridge. In the second half of the 19th century Welney became significant for its skaters. On 21 February 1855 Turkey Smart of Welney became champion skater of the Fens. James Smart of Welney became champion on 21 January 1891. William Loveday of Welney came 2nd to James Aveling of March in the amateur championship.

St Mary's Church in Welney is dedicated to the Virgin Mary.
