= Prickwillow Museum =

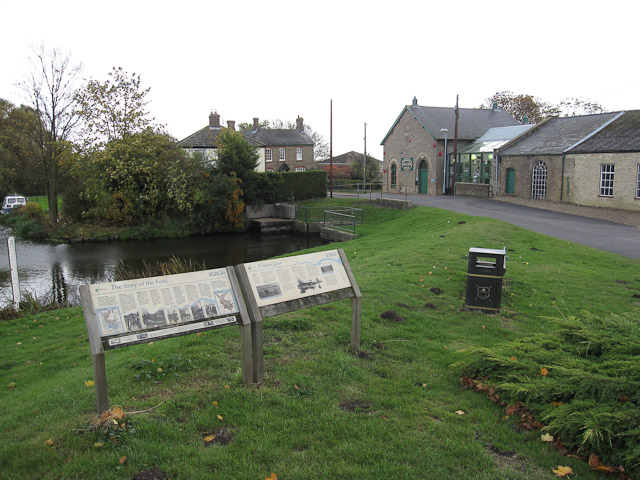
- The front of Prickwillow Museum by the River Lark

- The location of Prickwillow Museum within Cambridgeshire
- Location: Prickwillow, Cambridgeshire, UK
- Coordinates: 52.415°N 0.340°E
- Type: Technology museum
- Website: prickwillowmuseum.com

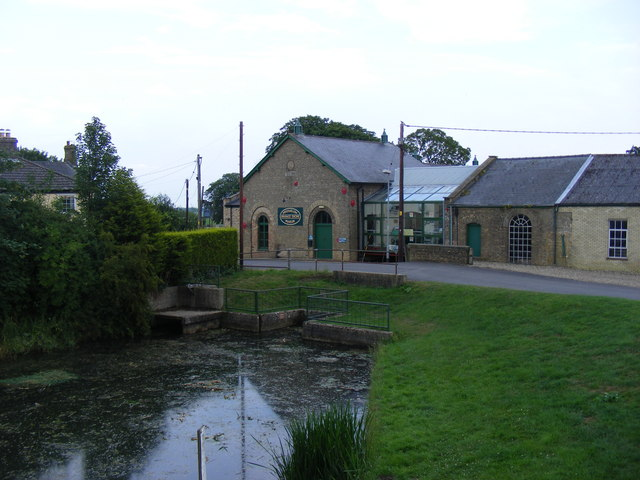
Prickwillow Museum

Prickwillow Museum, formerly known as the Prickwillow Drainage Engine Museum, tells the story of the changing face of the Fens and its network of drainage systems and pumping stations. The museum is housed in the old pumping station in Prickwillow, four miles (6.4 km) east of the city of Ely in Cambridgeshire, England.

The museum contains a major collection of large diesel pumping engines which have all been restored to working order.

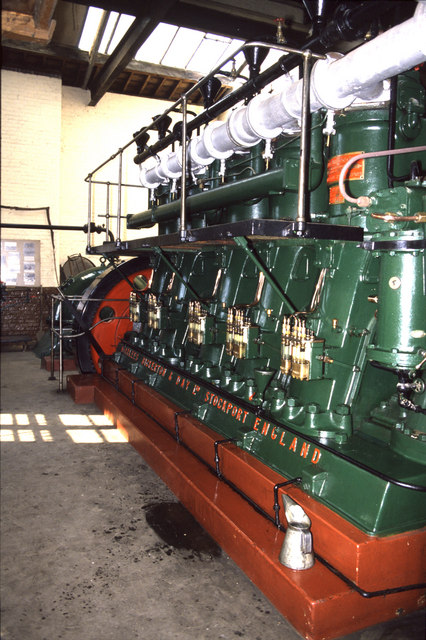
Mirrlees Pumping Engine in Prickwillow Museum

Prickwillow Museum is funded and run by the Prickwillow Engine Trust, a registered charity, and has received funding from the Heritage Lottery Fund and the Ouse Washes Landscape Partnership.

For one weekend in the early autumn every year the museum hosts the Prickwillow ploughing festival.

== See also ==
=== Other land drainage engines that are now preserved as museums ===
- Stretham Old Engine
- Dogdyke Pumping Station
- Wicken Fen
- Cambridge Museum of Technology
