= Washland =

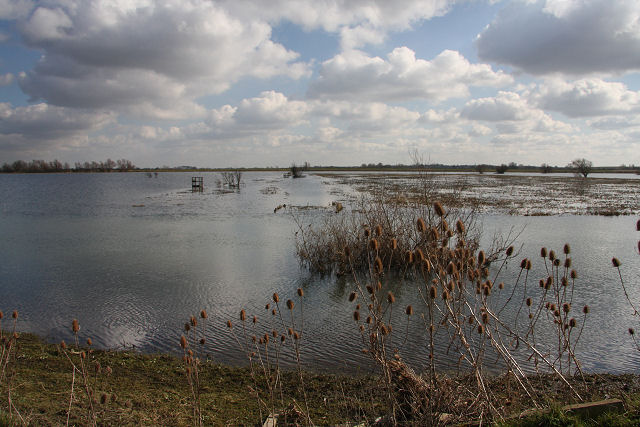
The Ouse Washes between the Old and New Bedford River

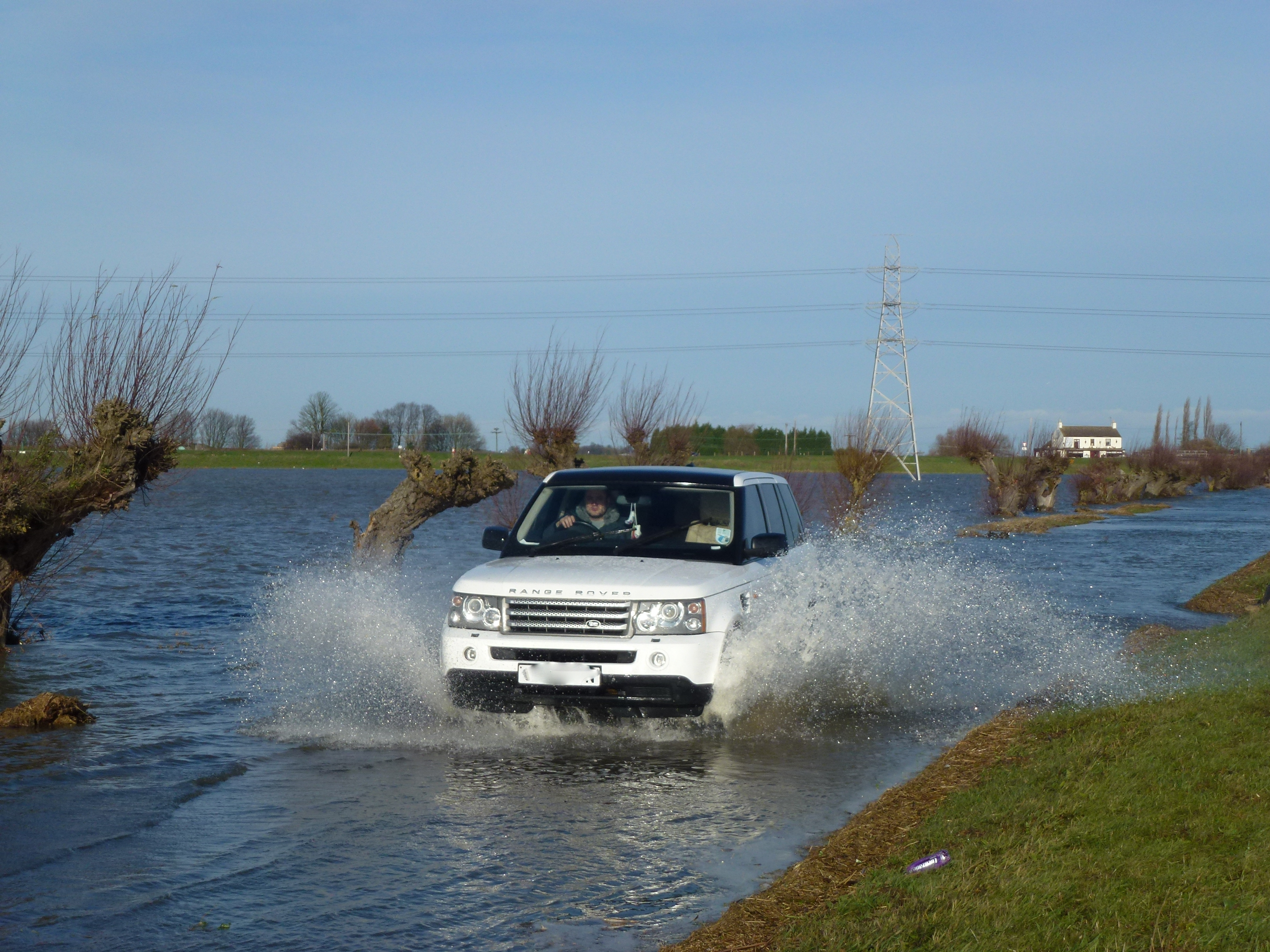
Car on the A1040 crossing flooded Whittlesey Wash, part of the Nene Washes

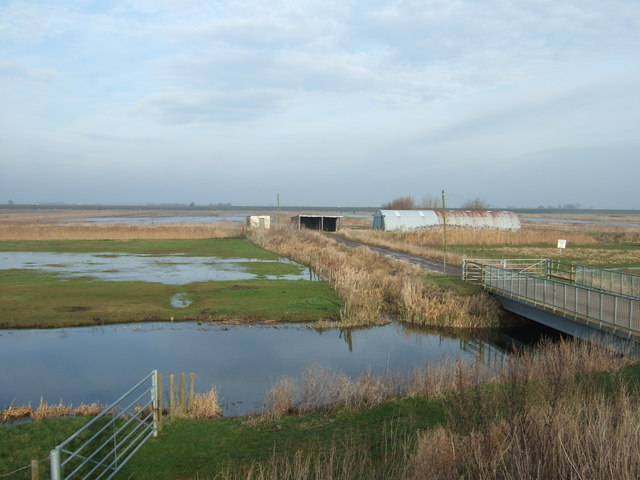
Guyhirn Wash, part of the Nene Washes

Washland or washes are areas of land adjacent to rivers which are deliberately flooded at times when the rivers are high, to avoid flooding in residential or important agricultural areas. They often provide for overwintering wildfowl, and several include important nature reserves.

Examples of washlands include:

- The Ouse Washes of Cambridgeshire and Norfolk
- The Nene Washes of Cambridgeshire
