= Pymoor =

Village in Cambridgeshire, England

Coordinates: 52.46°N 0.20°E

- Location within Cambridgeshire
- OS grid reference: TL495865
- Shire county: Cambridgeshire
- Region: East
- Country: England
- Sovereign state: United Kingdom
- Post town: ELY
- Postcode district: CB6
- Dialling code: 01353

Pymoor is a village in Cambridgeshire in the vicinity of Ely and in the parish of Little Downham. There are approximately 390 residents according to the 2011 census, although that figure probably includes the nearby settlements of Oxlode and Hundred Foot Bank. It is sometimes referred to as Pymore or Pyemoor. In 1997, the earliest spelling on record was decided as the "official" spelling.

The name Pymoor means "flies over bog" and the village sign shows a dragonfly settling on a bullrush in marshland. It is on the edge of the Ouse Washes at Welches Dam by the New Bedford River, and as a result geographically a close neighbour of Manea, but many miles away by road.

The Pymoor Country and Agricultural show is an annual one day show. A Methodist chapel is the only place of worship. The area around the village was used for filming the 2007 film Atonement.
