= Hathorn Davey =

British steam engines manufacturer

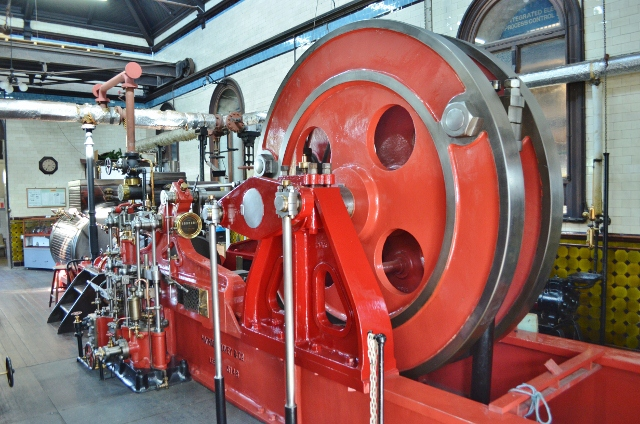
A Hathorn Davey 1894 Pumping Engine

Hathorn Davey was a British manufacturer of steam engines, based in Leeds, Yorkshire. The Sun foundry was established in 1846 and built railway engines and pumping machinery until 1870. The premises were taken over in 1872 by Hugh Campbel, Alfred Davis and John Hathorn. They were joined by Henry Davey in 1873 and traded as Hathorn, Davey & Co from 1880. The partnership was converted to a limited company in 1901. The company made marine engines and pumps as well as their pumping engines for mines and waterworks. The pumping engine built for the Mersey tunnel in 1881 was described at the time as the most powerful in existence. The firm was taken over by Sulzer in 1936. The premises closed in late 1981 when Sulzer moved to a new site.

== The horizontal compound differential pumping engine ==
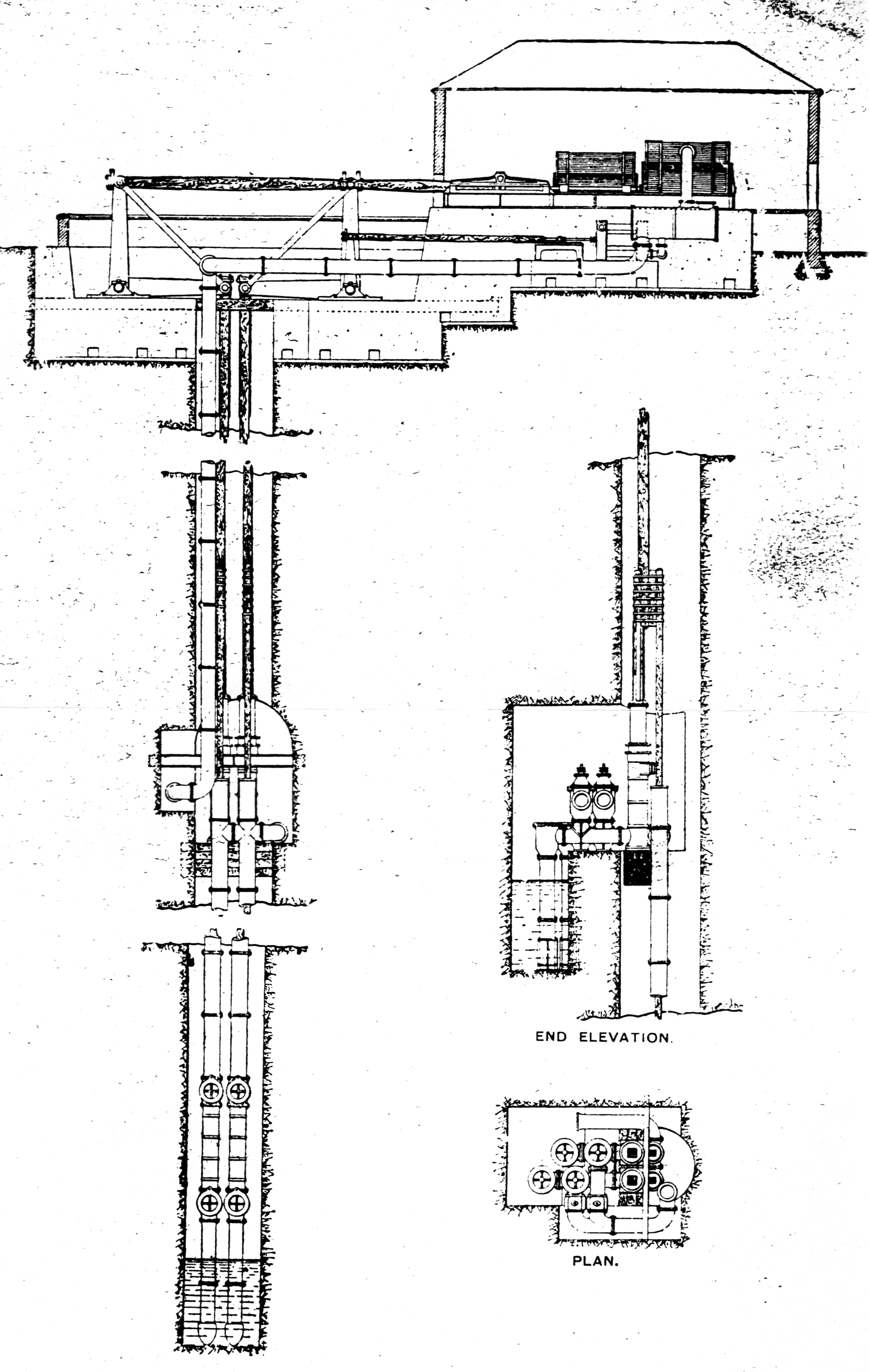

The horizontal compound differential pumping engine was one of the company's more successful engines. Patented in 1871, a company brochure lists 46 examples of these large engines built up to 1906. The leaflet also gives 32 examples where a smaller version of this engine was installed underground. The differential was a small engine resembling a boiler feed pump which was used to control the speed of the larger engine.

Davey pumps were installed in Japan, for example at Manda coal mine in 1876. The nearby Onga River Pumping Station of Yawata Steel Works also received a steam pump from Davey.

The largest concentration of this design was at the Tasmania Gold Mining Co's Beaconsfield mine where three engines were assembled. Each had cylinders of 50-inch (1,300 mm) and 108-inch (2,700 mm) diameter and raised 100,000 gallons of water per hour from 2,000 ft (610 m). Each engine drove two pumprods, each weighing 170 tons and driving six pumps. Beaconsfield mine closed in 1914 when the pumps were overwhelmed and re-opened in 1999. At least seven of these engines were used in the Furness iron mines, three at Yarlside and the remainder at Harrison Ainslie's pits. There is a surviving example at Cambridge Museum of Technology.
