= RAF Mepal =

Former RAF station in Cambridgeshire, England

RAF Mepal
- Near Mepal, Cambridgeshire in England
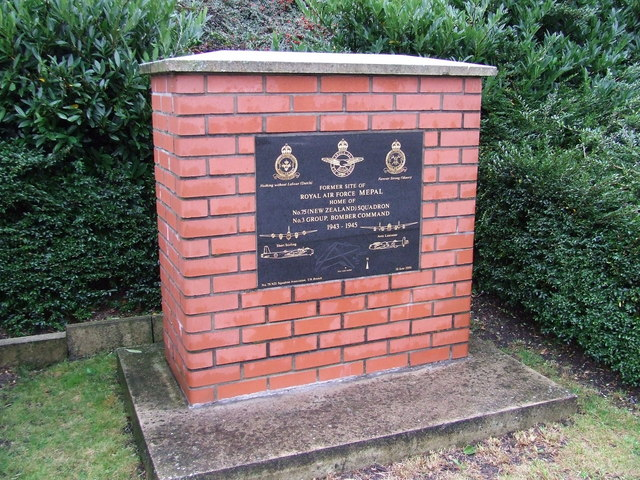

Site information
- Type: Royal Air Force Station
- Code: MP
- Owner: Ministry of Defence
- Operator: Royal Air Force
- Controlled by: RAF Bomber Command * No. 3 Group RAF

Location
- Shown within Cambridgeshire RAF Mepal (the United Kingdom)
- Coordinates: 52°23′44″N 000°07′11″E

Site history
- Built: 1942
- In use: June 1943 - 1963
- Battles/wars: European theatre of World War II

Airfield information
- Elevation: 24 metres (79 ft) AMSL
Runways
Direction	Length and surface
05/23	Concrete
08/26	Concrete
14/32	Concrete
- Other airfield facilities: Runway information

Royal Air Force Mepal or more simply RAF Mepal is a former Royal Air Force station located 0.7 miles (1.1 km) south of Mepal, Cambridgeshire, England and 5.9 miles (9.5 km) west of Ely, Cambridgeshire. Construction commenced in July 1942 and opened in June 1943.

== History ==
Mepal first hosted No. 75 (NZ) Squadron RAF flying Short Stirlings and later Avro Lancasters.

Tiger Force

It was used towards the end of the Second World War to prepare Avro Lancaster bombers squadrons such as No. 44 (Rhodesia) squadron for use in Tiger Force which was to bomb Japan.

Thor missiles

From 1957 PGM-17 Thor missiles were based at the airfield in the north east corner.

The following units were also here at some point:

- No. 7 Squadron RAF
- No. 49 Squadron RAF
- No. 113 Squadron RAF
- No. 1665 Heavy Conversion Unit RAF

== Current use ==
Very little remains of the original site, most of it razed to the ground after the USAF and the Thor missiles left. The site is now the Elean business park and is home to the world's only straw burning power station and a few manufacturing and warehousing operations. A small memorial plaque is in place at the entrance to the site.

== See also ==
- List of former Royal Air Force stations
