= Cambridge Museum of Technology =

Industrial heritage museum in Cambridge, England

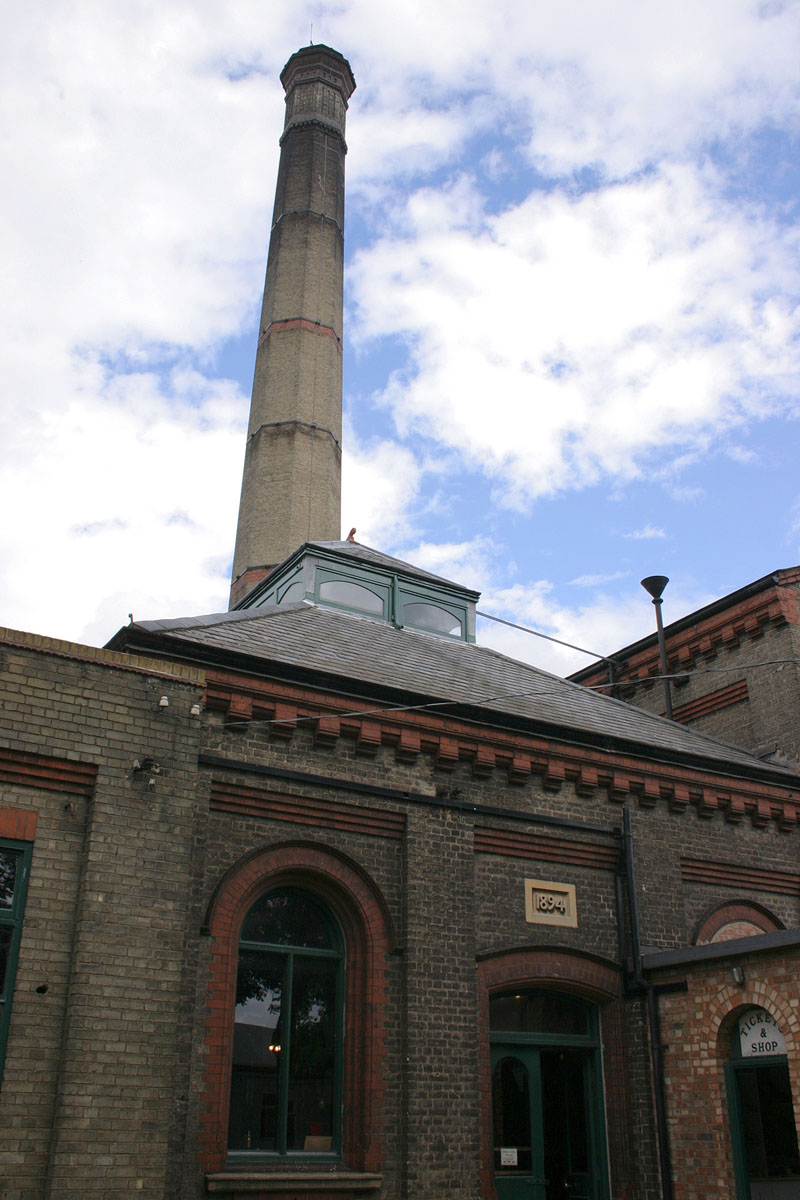
- The pumping station steam engine house
- Established: 1970
- Location: Cheddars Lane, Cambridge
- Coordinates: 52.2127°N 0.1433°E
- Website: www.museumoftechnology.com

The Cambridge Museum of Technology is an industrial heritage museum situated in Cambridge, England. The original building, a scheduled monument, housed a combined sewage pumping and waste destructor station built in 1894. The museum helps people to explore, enjoy, and learn about their industrial heritage by celebrating the achievements of local industries and the people who worked in them. The site on the River Cam has green spaces for picnics and a fun, relaxed atmosphere for families. There are audio-visual displays, hands-on exhibits, and children's activities, as well as museum displays and historic buildings. The Victorian Pumping Station, with its machinery, showcases 19th-century engineering and technology. Displays on the industries of Cambridge reveal an alternative side of the city's history to the famous colleges. And the story is brought into the 20th century with exhibitions on local companies in our Pye building. Featuring Pye (Electronics company) and Cambridge Scientific Instrument Company.

== History of the pumping station ==
The Cheddars Lane Pumping Station was originally opened in 1894 in a scheme which also saw the creation of a sewage farm at Milton, two and a quarter miles away. Household rubbish was burnt to raise steam, to power the engines which pumped sewage to the Milton sewage farm. At the farm, it was used as a fertiliser to grow the crops which fed the horses that pulled the carts which collected the rubbish and brought it to the pumping station. Even the ash from the burnt rubbish could be used in road making.

=== 1894, original equipment ===
Originally, the boilers used to provide steam to the sewage pumping engines were heated by the burning of waste collected around the city in destructor furnaces; these are the only near-complete examples that survive. It represents a typical early design and layout of a good medium-sized municipal destructor, buildings, and its equipment and chimney.

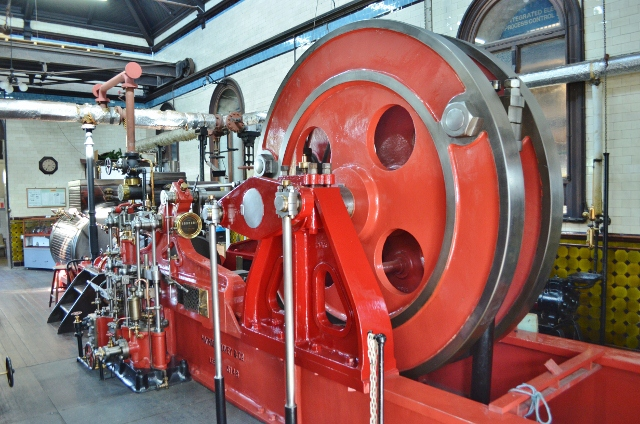
Hathorn Davey 1894 Pumping Engine

The museum's main attractions are two Hathorn Davey steam engines, one of which is fully operational and often runs on steam weekends. The purpose of these engines was to lift foul water (sewage and rain water) from the sump immediately below it to the sewage farm at Milton, the total lift being about 43 ft. These engines were designed to pump 250,000 gallons of sewage per hour, a job which they undertook until 1968, when a new electric engine house was built adjacent to the station, although this site shut down in 1994.

The chimney shaft is 175 ft. in height, octagonal with square base, lined with; fire-bricks for a height of 50 ft., and is 6 ft. 6 in. internal diameter at the top. In 1992 the chimney was laddered by Fred Dibnah, who undertook painting and pointing repairs and was featured in a BBC programme.

The building now used as the print shop was built as a public health disinfector in about 1900. Waste steam was used for sterilising bed linen and clothing from municipal hospitals and old people's homes, and latterly a workshop for the pumping station.

=== 1909, gas engines ===
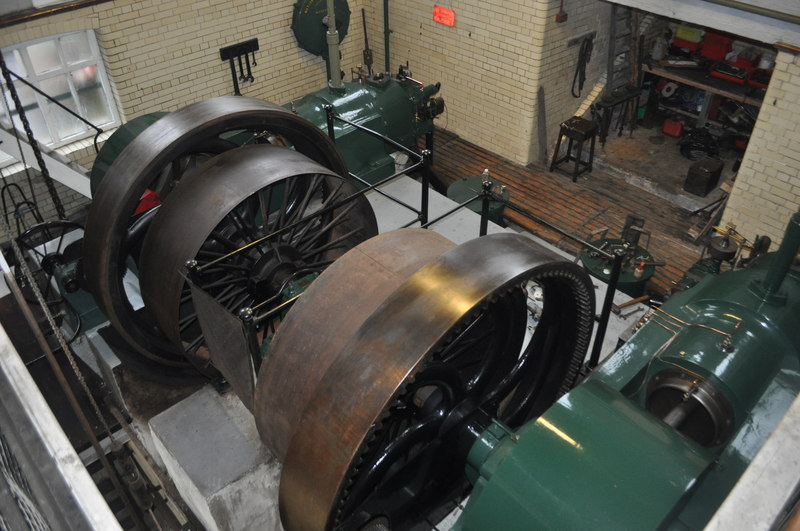
TL4659 Cambridge Gas Engines

To cope with pumping demand after heavy rainfall, caused by the expansion of Cambridge, in 1909 two 94 hp National gas engines were added to the pumping station. These engines drove, by a flat belt, two 15inch Rees Returbo centrifugal pumps, but these were replaced in 1935 by Gwynnes Limited pumps. They could pump to Milton or to temporary storage in storm water tanks, but the prime movers of the sewage remained the steam engines. The storm water tanks had a capacity of 1,085,275 gallons. Of these gas engines, currently one is in working order.

=== 1923, new boiler ===
By the 1920s, a combination of the reducing calorific value of the waste and an end to Sunday collection of waste led to an additional Babcock & Wilcox boiler being installed and used when there was insufficient waste for the destructor furnaces. This boiler was fuelled by coke, a by-product of the Coal gas production process, often being sourced from the Cambridge gas works next to the pumping station. By 1942 this boiler provided the main steam supply, the destructor cells being used only for trade refuse and standby duty.

=== 1937, electric pump ===
An electric pump was the last to be installed on the site in 1937. A Crompton Parkinson electric pump motor drove the 18inch (0.45m) diameter Gwynnes centrifugal pump 114 hp electric motor that can be seen at the river end of its dedicated room. Its purpose was to cope with the ever increasing storm surges from the new housing estates.

== Public reception ==
In June 2026 the Trustees of the Museum decided not to renew the lease for Kerb Kollective, a local independent cafe which existed on the site. This decision drew condemnation from members of the local community, who noted that Kerb Kollective was a valuable social hub for the community that appeared to be responsible for the majority of the museum's footfall.

== Collections ==
Other exhibits include a working steam winch, hauling a narrow gauge incline railway using side tipping skip wagons to assist with the ash removal; various other engines (steam and otherwise); a print room with a large collection of old printing technology including a Linotype machine; a large collection of electrical apparatuses and more.

== See also ==
- Prickwillow Museum
- Stretham Old Engine
- Anson Engine Museum
