= Ouse Washes =

Nature reserve in the United Kingdom

Coordinates: 52.46°N 0.19°E

- Site of Special Scientific Interest
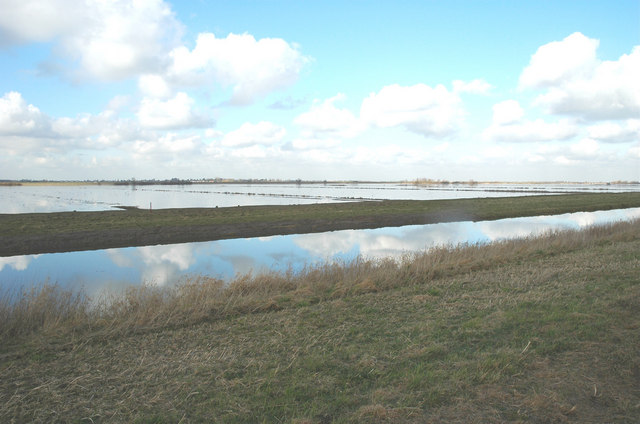
- In flood
- Location of Ouse Washes.
- Area of search: Cambridgeshire; Norfolk
- Grid reference: TL 490 879
- Interest: Biological
- Area: 2,513.6 hectares (6,211 acres)
- Notification date: 1984
- Location map: Magic Map

Designations

Ramsar Wetland
- Official name: Ouse Washes
- Designated: 5 January 1976
- Reference no.: 77

Ouse Washes is a linear 2,513.6-hectare (6,211-acre) biological Site of Special Scientific Interest stretching from near St Ives in Cambridgeshire to Downham Market in Norfolk, England. It is also a Ramsar internationally important wetland site, a Special Protection Area for birds, a Special Area of Conservation and a Nature Conservation Review site, Grade I. An area of 186 hectares (460 acres) between March and Ely is managed by the Wildlife Trust for Bedfordshire, Cambridgeshire and Northamptonshire and another area near Chatteris is managed by the Royal Society for the Protection of Birds. The Wildfowl & Wetlands Trust manages another area near Welney.

The site lies between the Old Bedford River in the north-west and the New Bedford River in the south-east. The Washes are a flood storage area and are often under water in the winter. It is internationally significant for wintering and breeding wildfowl and waders, especially teal, pintail, Eurasian wigeon, shoveler, pochard and Bewick's swans. The site also has rich aquatic fauna and flora, and areas of unimproved grassland.

== History ==
After the last glaciation between 100,000 and 10,000 years ago the sea level in eastern England was about 30 metres (98 ft) lower than at present. As the ice retreated during the Mesolithic, the sea level rose, filling what is now the North Sea, and bringing the Norfolk coastline much closer to its present line. Coastal woodland was drowned by the returning sea and slowly degraded to peat overlying deposits of marine clays and creating the Fens.

Prior to the seventeenth century the Fens of eastern England were tidal marshland, frequently flooded and suitable for little more than summer grazing. In 1630, King Charles I granted a drainage charter to the 4th Earl of Bedford and his Adventurers, who constructed the Old Bedford River between Earith, Cambridgeshire and Downham Market, Norfolk, to facilitate drainage of the large area that became known as the Bedford Level. The Dutch engineer Cornelius Vermuyden was engaged to complete the project and constructed the New Bedford River parallel to the old. The start of the works was interrupted by the English Civil War, but recommenced under Oliver Cromwell in 1649, and was completed in 1656.

== Water control ==
The Ouse Washes are part of the system for controlling the flow of the Great Ouse when water levels in the river are high. In normal conditions, the waters of the Great Ouse run through the New Bedford River (or Hundred Foot Drain) to join the tidal stretch of the river at Welmore Lake Sluice, where another automatic system controls outflow. High water levels open the automatic sluice at Earith, thereby releasing water to the Old Bedford River, which eventually overflows onto the washland between the Bedford rivers, with the Welmore automatic sluice controlling outflow. When levels drop, the washes drain back into the Old Bedford River.

The Environment Agency sets the trigger level for the sluices, allowing higher levels in the Great Ouse in summer than in winter.The enclosed area of washland runs from Earith northeast to Downham Market where it links via the New Bedford River to the tidal Great Ouse and hence to the sea. At capacity, the site can accommodate 90,000,000 cubic metres (3.2×10^{9} cu ft), although it only completely filled in 1947.

The washland area between the rivers is 32 kilometres (20 mi) long and about 1 kilometre (0.62 mi) wide and acts as a floodplain during the winter and, increasingly, also in the summer. The area between the outer barrier banks of the two artificial rivers covers about 1,900 hectares (4,700 acres). As the peat underlying the Fens has dried out through drainage, it has shrunk and lowered the level of the washlands, making flooding more frequent. The Washes and its banks have a total area of 2,400 hectares (5,900 acres), and newly created wet grasslands adjacent to the washes increase the total area to 2,750 hectares (6,800 acres). About 10% of the area is open water, but most of the habitat is grassland with reed canary-grass in the wettest locations, transitioning through reed sweet-grass to the creeping bent that dominates in the drier areas.

== Ownership and conservation ==
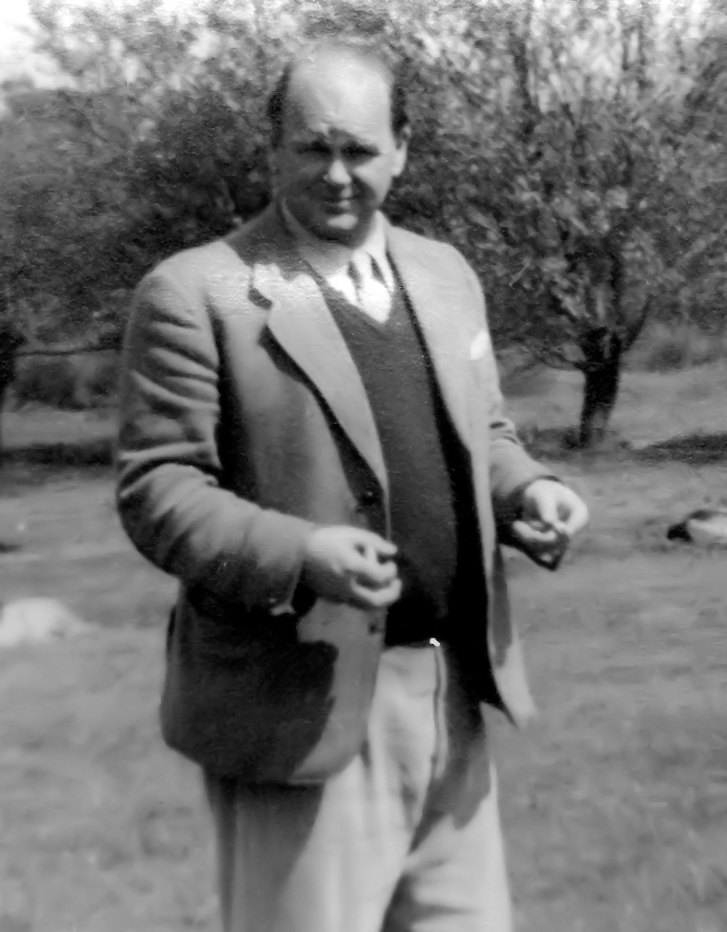
Peter Scott in 1954

The Ouse Washes are important as one of only two remaining large regularly flooded washlands in Britain, the other being the nearby Nene Washes in Cambridgeshire. When at Cambridge University, Peter Scott, who would become a naturalist and founder of what is now the Wildfowl & Wetlands Trust (WWT) became a regular visitor to the washes, and in 1967 he purchased 40 hectares (100 acres) for £4000 (Note: About £77,000 at 2021 values using MeasuringWorth) to form the core of what is now WWT Welney Wetland Centre. The Royal Society for the Protection of Birds (RSPB) also actively purchased large areas of land, and the Cambridgeshire and Isle of Ely Naturalists' Trust (now the Wildlife Trust for Bedfordshire, Cambridgeshire and Northamptonshire (WTBCN)) bought 186 hectares (460 acres) .

By 2010, the three conservation bodies owned 1,540 hectares (3,800 acres) of the site. 200 hectares (490 acres) is held by other organisations, including the Fenland Wildfowlers Association (53 hectares (132 acres), the Spalding & District Wildfowlers Association (25 hectares (62 acres) and private individuals. The wildfowling clubs work closely with the conservation bodies to protect breeding birds.

The Ouse Washes Landscape Partnership scheme (OWLP) was a £1 million, 3-year project supported by the Heritage Lottery Fund which ran from 2014 to 2017. The scheme focused on the promotion of the area surrounding the Ouse Washes, the heart of the Cambridgeshire and Norfolk Fens, and on encouraging community engagement with the area's diverse heritage. The area is mostly within 1 kilometre (0.62 mi) of the SSSI but outside the barrier walls. A survey of the ditches showed that they were important for amphibians water voles, dragonflies and damselflies. More than 100 water beetle species included five for which the Fens are their national stronghold, and the 175 drain plants included eight of conservation concern.

=== RSPB Ouse Washes ===
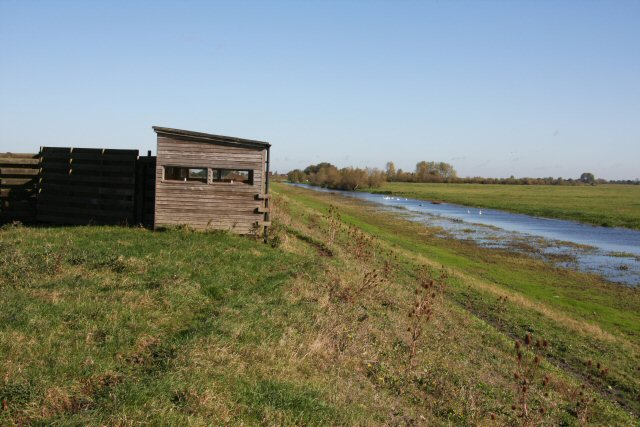
An RSPB hide overlooking the Old Bedford River

RSPB Ouse Washes is a nature reserve, managed by the Royal Society for the Protection of Birds at Welches Dam. It is signposted from Manea village which is 9.7 kilometres (6 mi) east of Chatteris on the A142/A141 between Ely and March. The RSPB facilities also cover the area owned by WTBCN.

The reserve is on the western side of the washes, south of the A1101 road. Its unstaffed visitor centre is open from 9 am to 5 pm, the car park, toilets and the reserve itself are always open, but there is no shop. There are two birds hides south of the visitor centre, the nearer, 300 metres (980 ft) from the centre, is wheelchair accessible, the further is 850 metres (2,790 ft). there are six hides north of the visitor centre, the furthest being 2,800 metres (9,200 ft) from the centre. In wet conditions, the path along the bank can be very muddy.

=== WWT Welney Wetland Centre ===
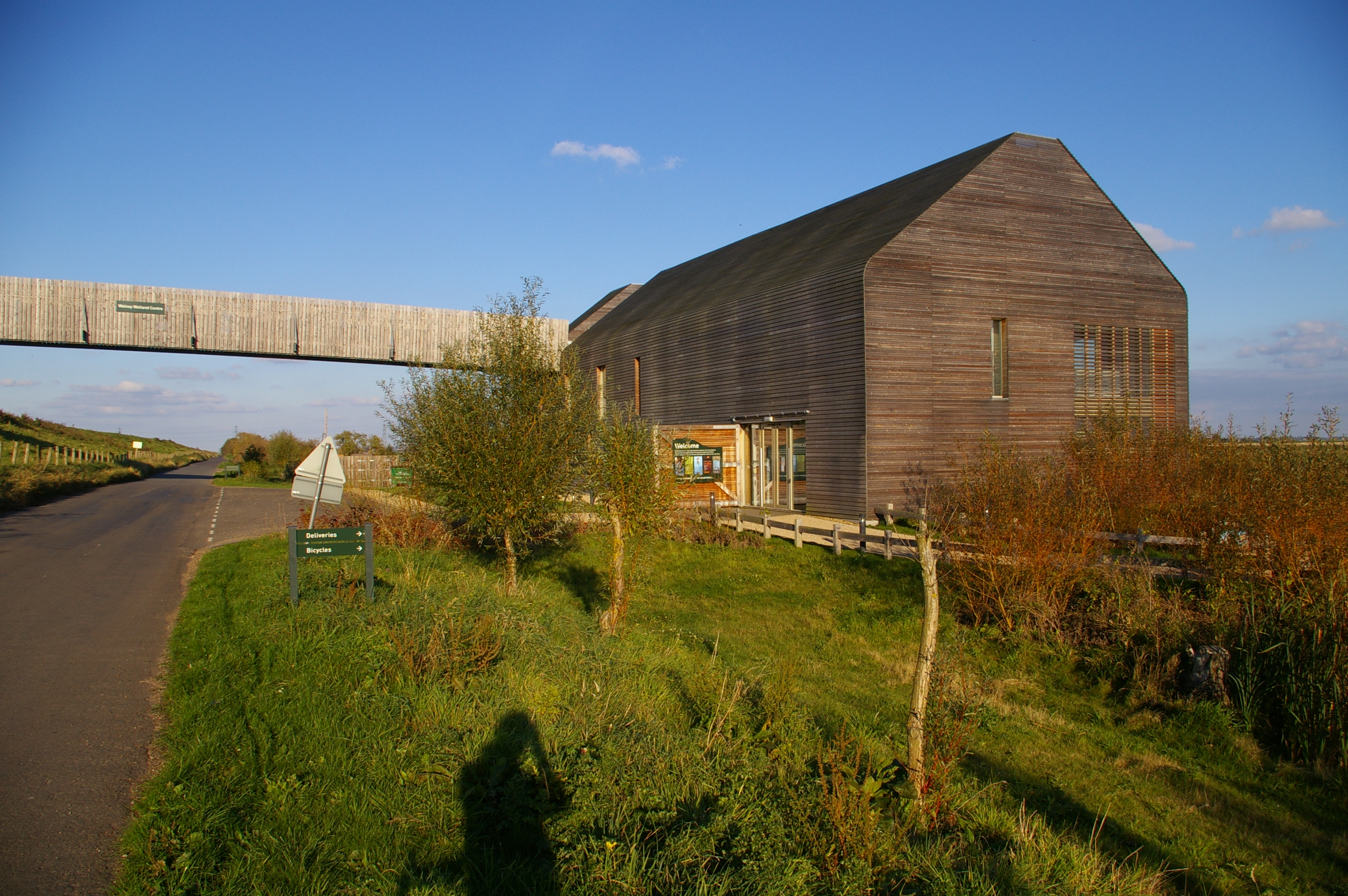
Welney Wetland Centre: the bridge accesses the hides

The 1,000 hectares (2,500 acres) of the Welney Wetland Centre is one of ten wildfowl and wetland reserves managed by the Wildfowl & Wetlands Trust (WWT). It lies north of the A1101 road where it crosses the washes. It has a visitor centre and café, and viewing facilities include an observatory with two wing hides. There is a further bird hide south of the observatory and four to the north. All the main hides are accessible except the third to the north. There are also some two-person hides accessed by steps. Road access to the reserve car park is via Hundred Foot Bank, Welney, Norfolk.

There is an entry charge for non-members of the WWT. The visitor centre is open from 10 am to 4 pm, although the café closes at 3.30 pm. The centre received 29,372 visitors in 2018.

=== Extensions ===
Increased summer flooding led to declines in the numbers of breeding waders from the 1970s onwards, and to counteract this areas of former farmland adjacent to the washes were acquired and converted to wet grassland. The WWT's Lady Fen is adjacent to the Welney Wetland Centre and was converted from farmland between 2007 and 2013. The RSPB, WWT and WTBCN have also modified land adjacent to the RSPB reserve. The eventual aim is to expand this to 1,000 hectares (2,500 acres), although as of 2022 only 135 hectares (330 acres) had been acquired. The total additional area of the "new" meadows is 350 hectares (860 acres).

== Flora and fauna ==
=== Birds ===
==== Breeding species ====
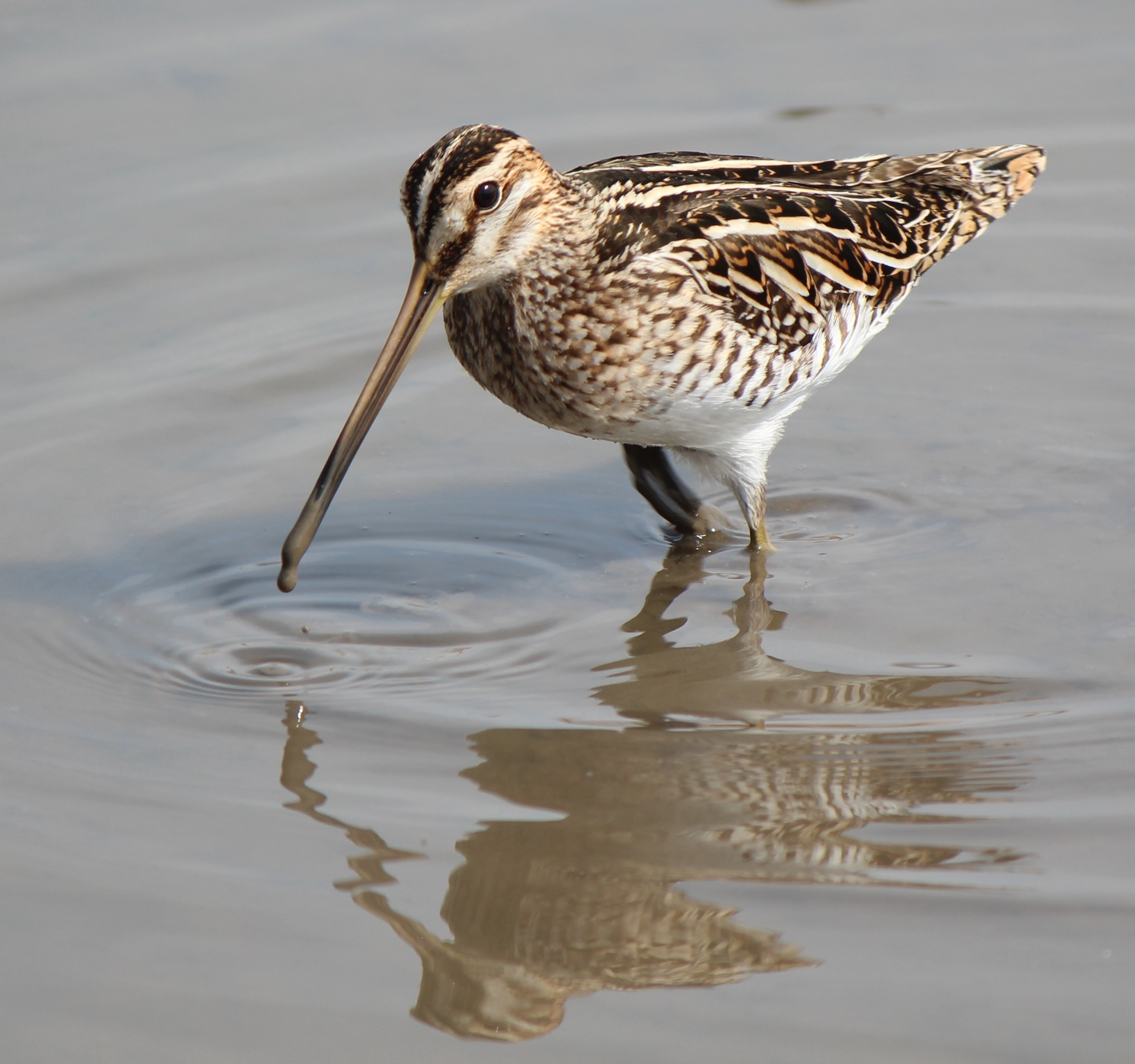
Common snipe

The Ouse Washes are the most important site in England and Wales for breeding snipe, and also hold good populations of lapwings and redshanks and oystercatchers. Black-tailed godwits were found breeding in 1952, and reached a peak of 65 pairs by 1972, but flooding severely reduced breeding success until the extension projects enabled up to 19 pairs to breed. Corn crakes released on the Nene Washes from 2005 as part of a reintroduction scheme found the Ouse Washes more to their liking with up to seven calling males each year, and several spotted crakes also call in the spring.

Breeding ducks include 15% of the UK's garganey. Recent colonisers include the little egret (77 pairs in 2020), great white egret and bittern, while some former breeders including ruff and Savi's warbler have been lost. Little gulls, black terns and black-winged stilts have occasionally bred. Waders breed on the extension areas at a density of about four pairs per hectare (two pairs per acre), 18 times the level on the main site. Hobbies, marsh harriers and barn owls all breed around the washes, as do yellow wagtails, corn buntings and tree sparrows, and kingfishers nest in artificial banks.

==== Wintering birds ====
The Ouse Washes hosts Bewick's and whooper swans in winter, which feed on nearby farmland during the day, returning to the washes in the evening, where visitors can watch them being fed under floodlight near the visitor centre. More than 12,500 whooper swans wintered in 2021, about 5% of the world population. The number of Bewick's swans reaching the UK has fallen dramatically in the current century, as milder winters encourage them to remain in continental Europe, but several hundred still visit the washes.

The washes are of international importance for six species of wintering ducks, notably more than 20,000 wigeon. High waters levels prevent wigeon grazing on grass, and the extension areas were designed with this species in mind, so that they could feed when the main site was flooded. Up to 40 tundra bean geese and 130 white-fronted geese visit annually. Gulls roost overnight, as do hen harriers, and common cranes also spend the night on the washes after foraging for maize stubble on the arable farmland. A pair of cranes bred successfully on Lady Fen in 2018.

==== Migrants and rarities ====
Large numbers of migrants may seek temporary refuge on the marshes, including 2 million sand martins (1968) 5,000 common snipe (1979), 500 ruffs (1989) and 130 red-breasted mergansers (1956). Major rarities recorded include a pied-billed grebe in 1968, a falcated duck, Britain's first, in 1986, and a canvasback in 1997. More recent visitors have included a northern harrier in 2013, a Baikal teal in 2014, an isabelline wheatear in 2016 and a gull-billed tern in 2017. Scarce waders such as pectoral sandpiper, Temminck's stint and red-necked phalarope are almost annual.

=== Other animals ===
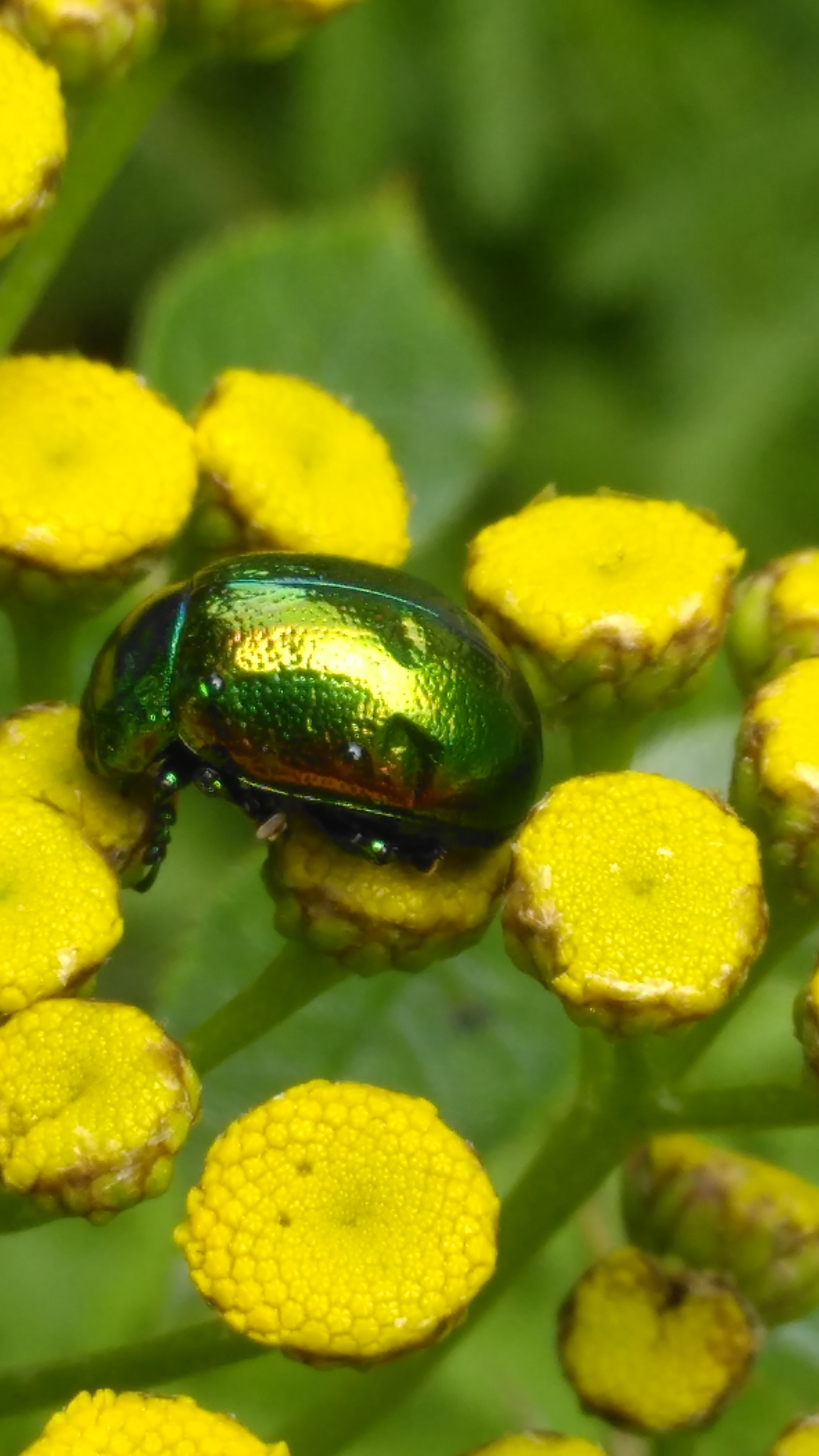
Tansy beetle on tansy flower heads

Of the large mammals, Roe deer, water deer, badgers and otters are common on the washes, with brown hare on the adjacent grasslands and small numbers of water voles in the wet areas. Regularly recorded bats include soprano pipistrelle, noctule and Daubenton's bat. The large fish population includes European eel and spined loach.

There is a rich invertebrate fauna, including tansy beetle, which here feeds on water mint rather than the normal tansy. Scarce insects include the variable damselfly, scarce chaser, wall brown and clouded yellow.

=== Plants ===
Apart from the grassland, there are small patches of trees and osier, but the main interest lies in rare aquatic plants such as greater water-parsnip and fringed water lily, although the diversity and numbers of such species has reduced due to nutrient deposition by floodwater. The areas neighbouring the washland, used for intensive arable farming for 50 years, have now been reseeded with grasses and associated plants such as meadow buttercup, tufted vetch, ribwort plantain. and flowering rush.

== Management and protection ==
The washes are managed for traditional grazing and hay-making using professional livestock managers to determine a regime that minimises the amount of disturbance to the breeding waders and controls water levels within the washes. There are also "scrapes", areas of bare mud situated so as to be readily visible to birdwatchers. The new areas outside the washes are kept wet through a closely spaced network of ditches filled from ground aquifers by submersible pumps, and protected by fox- and badger-proof fences.

It is anticipated that a combination of lower flows in the Great Ouse and higher sea water levels will make it harder to manage drainage, although more areas of shallow water might benefit potential colonising breeders including the glossy ibis, black-winged stilt and various heron and egret species.

Because of its importance to wildlife, the Ouse Washes is a Site of Special Scientific Interest a Ramsar internationally important wetland site, a Special Protection Area for birds, a Special Area of Conservation, and a Nature Conservation Review site, Grade I.
