= Earith =

Village in Cambridgeshire, England

Coordinates: 52.35°N 0.02°E

- Location within Cambridgeshire
- Population: 1,606 (2011)
- OS grid reference: TL373743
- Civil parish: Earith
- District: Huntingdonshire
- Shire county: Cambridgeshire
- Region: East
- Country: England
- Sovereign state: United Kingdom
- Post town: Huntingdon
- Postcode district: PE28
- Dialling code: 01487
- Police: Cambridgeshire
- Fire: Cambridgeshire
- Ambulance: East of England
- UK Parliament: North West Cambridgeshire

Earith is a village and civil parish in Cambridgeshire, England. Lying approximately 10 miles (16 km) east of Huntingdon, Earith is situated within Huntingdonshire which is a non-metropolitan district of Cambridgeshire as well as being a historic county of England. At Earith, two artificial diversion channels of the River Great Ouse, the Old Bedford River and the New Bedford River, leave the river on a course to Denver Sluice near Downham Market, where they rejoin the Great Ouse in its tidal part. At the 2001 census, the parish had a population of 1,677, reducing to 1,606 at the 2011 Census.

== History ==
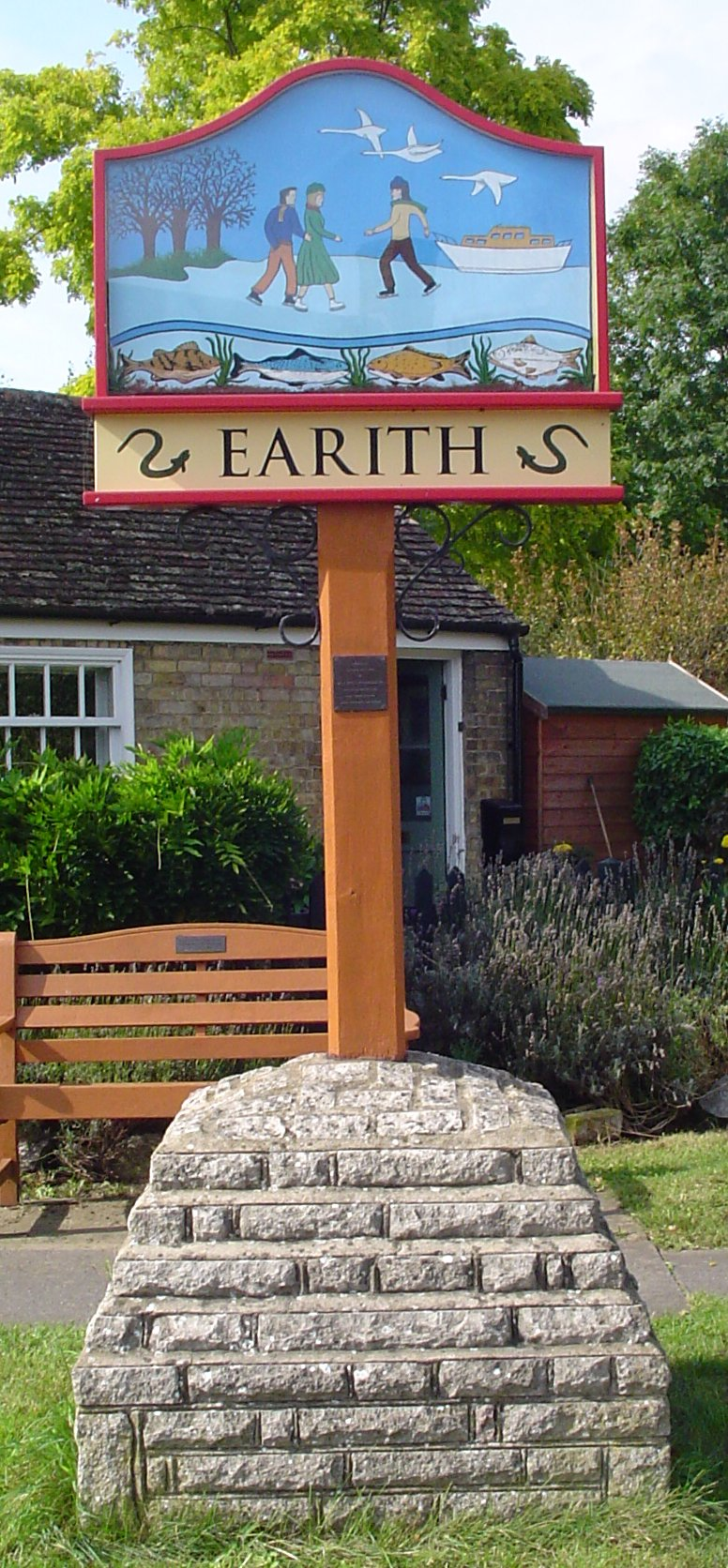
Earith village sign

=== Roman statue ===
A Roman bronze statue was found to the west of the village at Bury Fen in 1826. It is now in the British Museum.

=== Earith Bulwark ===
To the north east of the village, between the Old Bedford River and the New Bedford River lies the remains of an English Civil War fort known as Earith Bulwark. It is believed to have been constructed as early as 1643, to fortify the crossing point of the River Great Ouse. Many fenland inhabitants resented the Royalists because they believed that the King's drainage projects undertaken by Dutch engineer Cornelius Vermuyden, had damaged their livelihoods (his Forty Foot Drain had been completed in 1637). Today, the fort is visible as a series of earthworks only, showing a bastion fort design with ditches and corner bastions. It is similar in design to Fort Nassau at Aardenburg in the Netherlands. During the Second World War, a machine gun turret was built on the south bastion.

=== 1942 air crash ===
On 17 January 1942 a number of RAF serviceman were killed in a crash involving a Hawker Hurricane from 61 Operational Training Unit and a Short Stirling bomber. The Stirling was flying from RAF Oakington with 7 Squadron and the accident occurred just north of Earith Bridge.

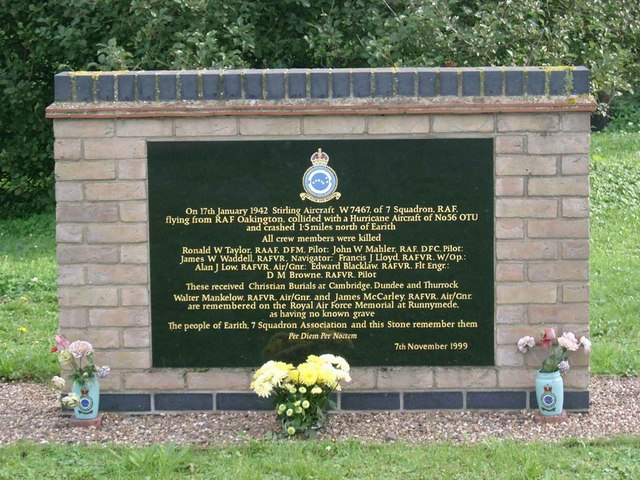
17 January 1942 aeroplane collision and crash memorial

=== Battle of Earith gap ===
In the Winter of 1946–47, there was the "Battle of Earith Gap". Melting snow had built up in the Fenland waterways, unable to be released into the sea because of high tides. On 17 March a 50 yards (46 m) gap was torn in the river bank, and water poured out to flood the Fen farms for five days. Eventually the breach was blocked with amphibious vehicles while more orthodox repair work was carried out.

=== RTV31 tests ===
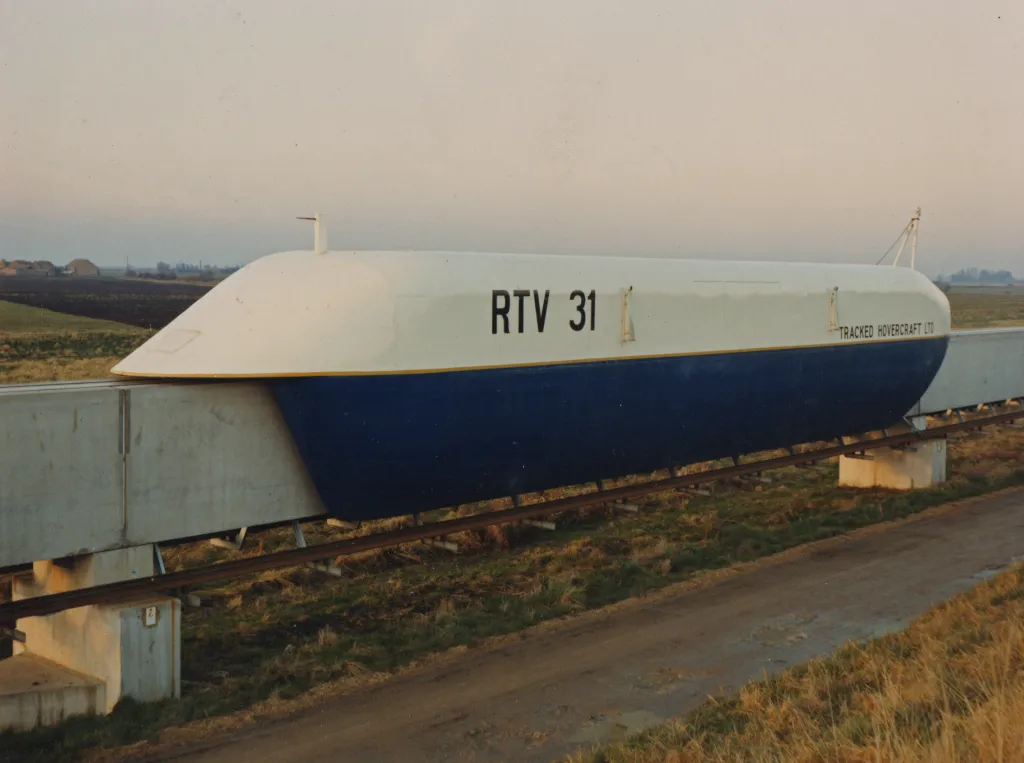
The RTV 31 during tests in 1973

In 1973 the RTV 31 was tested in Earith, Both remains of the concreate pillars of the tracks and the warehouse that was used are visible as of 2026

=== 1988 air crash ===
A USAF Fairchild Republic A-10 Thunderbolt II crashed on Thursday 22 December 1988 between the village and Over. First Lt Frank Cavuoti from RAF Alconbury of 511th Tactical Fighter Squadron ejected. He attended the USAF medical clinic at RAF Upwood.

== Government ==
As a civil parish, Earith has a parish council. The parish council is elected by the residents of the parish who have registered on the electoral roll; the parish council is the lowest tier of government in England. A parish council is responsible for providing and maintaining a variety of local services including allotments and a cemetery; grass cutting and tree planting within public open spaces such as a village green or playing fields . The parish council reviews all planning applications that might affect the parish and makes recommendations to Huntingdonshire District Council, which is the local planning authority for the parish. The parish council also represents the views of the parish on issues such as local transport, policing and the environment. The parish council raises its own tax to pay for these services, known as the parish precept, which is collected as part of the Council Tax. The parish council consists of eleven councillors and normally meets on the first Thursday of the month at the village hall.

Earith was in the historic and administrative county of Huntingdonshire until 1965. From 1965, the village was part of the new administrative county of Huntingdon and Peterborough. Then in 1974, following the Local Government Act 1972, Earith became a part of the county of Cambridgeshire.

The second tier of local government is Huntingdonshire District Council which is a non-metropolitan district of Cambridgeshire and has its headquarters in Huntingdon. Huntingdonshire District Council has 52 councillors representing 29 district wards. Huntingdonshire District Council collects the council tax, and provides services such as building regulations, local planning, environmental health, leisure and tourism. Earith is a district ward and is represented on the district council by two councillors. District councillors serve for four year terms following elections to Huntingdonshire District Council.

For Earith the highest tier of local government is Cambridgeshire County Council which has administration buildings in Cambridge. The county council provides county-wide services such as major road infrastructure, fire and rescue, education, social services, libraries and heritage services. Cambridgeshire County Council consists of 69 councillors representing 60 electoral divisions. Earith is part of the electoral division of Somersham and Earith and is represented on the county council by one councillor.

At Westminster Earith is in the parliamentary constituency of North West Cambridgeshire, and elects one Member of Parliament (MP) by the first past the post system of election. Earith is represented in the House of Commons by Shailesh Vara (Conservative). Shailesh Vara has represented the constituency since 2005. The previous member of parliament was Brian Mawhinney (Conservative) who represented the constituency between 1997 and 2005.

== Culture and community ==
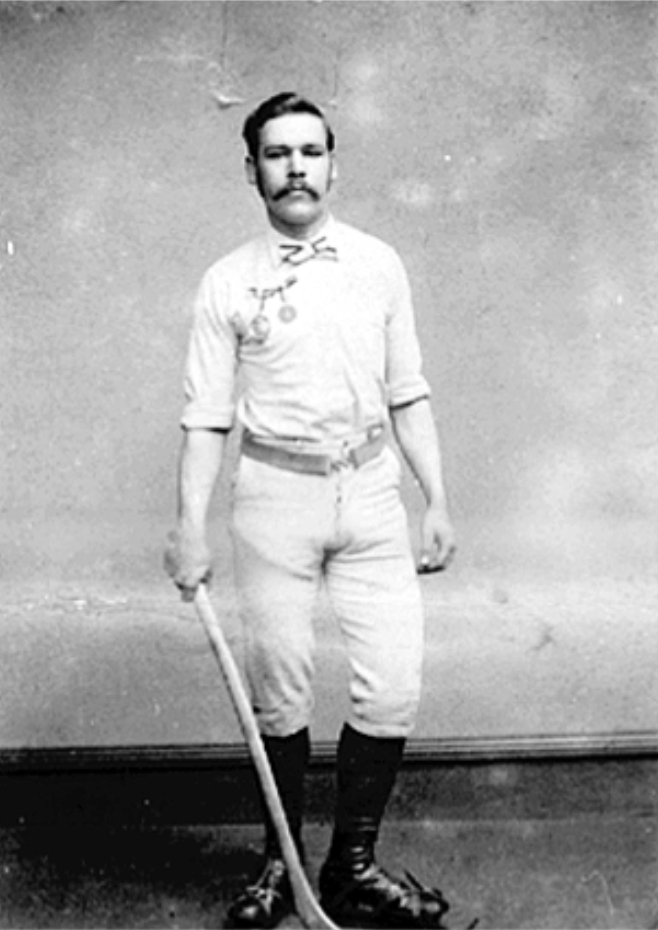
Charles Goodman Tebbutt with a bandy stick. Speed skater and bandy player Charles Goodman Tebbutt came from the now dissolved parish of Bluntisham-cum-Earith. He was responsible for writing most of the modern bandy rules.

The village has a post office, a Tandoori takeaway, a barber’s shop, one public house (The Crown) and a school. The village does not have a parish church.

What was once the National School has been converted into flats, and the Wesleyan Methodist chapel, erected in 1828, is now a private house. The village is home to a marina, and during winter months ice skating was popular at nearby Bury Fen. Both activities are depicted in the village sign. A bandy statue has been erected at a pond in the village, as Bluntisham-cum-Earith is at the core of bandy history.

Two large lakes were formed to the north of the village during gravel quarrying in the 1960s. Today the site is home to a fishery.

== Transport ==
=== Active Transport ===
The long-distance footpath the Ouse Valley Way links the village with Stretham (11 miles (18 km)) and St Ives (6 miles (10 km)). The footpath covers (150 miles (241 km)) in total between the source of the River Great Ouse at Syresham and its mouth in The Wash near King's Lynn.

A cycle path running along the route of the A1123 (and through Needingworth village) links Earith with St Ives (5.2 miles (8 km)) along a wide path suitable for cycles.

=== Rail ===
The village was connected to the railway network in 1865, with a railway station located to the east of the village, in an area named Earith Bridge, on the Ely and St Ives Railway. Passenger services were discontinued in 1931, and the Earith section of railway was closed in 1958. Nothing remains of the railway station at Earith Bridge however stone plinths that used to carry the railway over the River Great Ouse and a flood plain that runs alongside it can still be seen from the Ouse Valley Way footpath.

=== Buses ===
Earith is served by two bus routes, the 301, that connects it to St Ives and Somersham with some journeys serving Warboys and Ramsey. It is operated by Dews Coaches of Somersham. And the Tiger 12, that connects it to Longstanton, via Willingham. It is operated by A2B
