= New Bedford River =

Watercourse in Cambridgeshire, England

Coordinates: 52°28′N 0°12′E

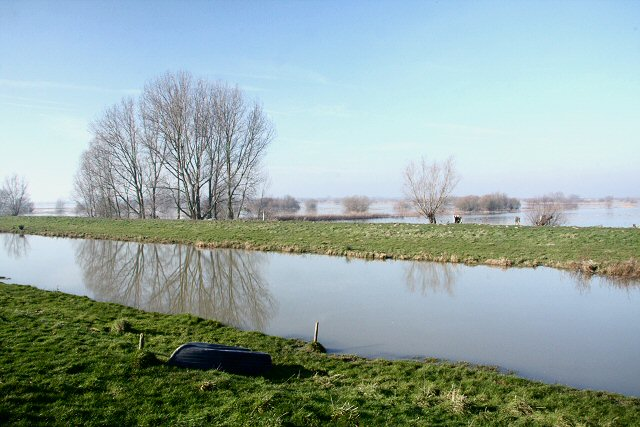
- New Bedford River at Oxlode
- Interactive map of New Bedford River

Specifications
- Status: Open
- Navigation authority: Environment Agency

History
- Principal engineer: Cornelius Vermuyden
- Date of act: 1649
- Date of first use: 1652

Geography
- Start point: Earith
- End point: Denver Sluice
- Connects to: River Great Ouse

The New Bedford River, also known as the Hundred Foot Drain because of the distance between the tops of the two embankments on either side of the river, is a navigable man-made cut-off or by-pass channel of the River Great Ouse in the Fens of Cambridgeshire, England. It provides an almost straight channel between Earith and Denver Sluices. The river is tidal, with reverse tidal flow being clearly visible at Welney, some 19 miles (31 km) from the sea.

== History ==
In the 1620s, there was discontent in the region through which the New Bedford River now flows, as the land was regularly inundated by flood water. Francis Russell, 4th Earl of Bedford, who owned huge tracts of land in the vicinity, agreed to carry out drainage works in 1630, in return for 95,000 acres (38,000 ha) of the land which would be reclaimed. He was joined in the project by thirteen other adventurers, who formed a corporation and obtained a charter to carry out the work in 1634. The Dutch engineer Cornelius Vermuyden was engaged to oversee the work, which included nine major drainage channels, including the Bedford River, which ran from Earith to Salter's Lode. The tract of land through which it ran became known as the Bedford Level, and the scheme was declared to be complete in 1637. However, in 1638, that decision was reversed, and King Charles I became the undertaker to ensure the work was completed. The adventurers were given 40,000 acres (16,000 ha) for the work that had already been carried out, and further work was again to be overseen by Vermuyden, but little work was done, as the English Civil War intervened. The existing works were neglected, and some were deliberately damaged during the hostilities.

In 1649, interest in the drainage of the Bedford Level resumed, and a second Drainage Act was obtained. It became known as the 'Pretended Act', and authorised William Russell, the 5th Earl of Bedford, to carry out further work, the chief of which was a second channel parallel to the Bedford River. Vermuyden was again the engineer, and the new channel was completed in 1652. The Bedford River became known as the Old Bedford River, and the new channel became the New Bedford River. Sluices were built at Earith and Denver, and the river carried most of the flow of the River Great Ouse, resulting in its old course via Ely becoming just a drainage channel. The Corporation of the Bedford Level was set up, and took control of the river and the drainage channels, under the terms of the General Drainage Act, passed in 1663. This move was not popular with those engaged in navigation on the Great Ouse, as the sluices were operated for the benefit of the drainage scheme, and boats often had to wait for days or weeks while the sluices remained closed. The destruction of the Denver Sluice in 1713, caused by exceptional flood levels, was celebrated by the boatmen, but the resultant flooding led to the Corporation building a new sluice between 1748 and 1750. The concerns of the boatmen were placated by the provision of a navigation lock in the structure.

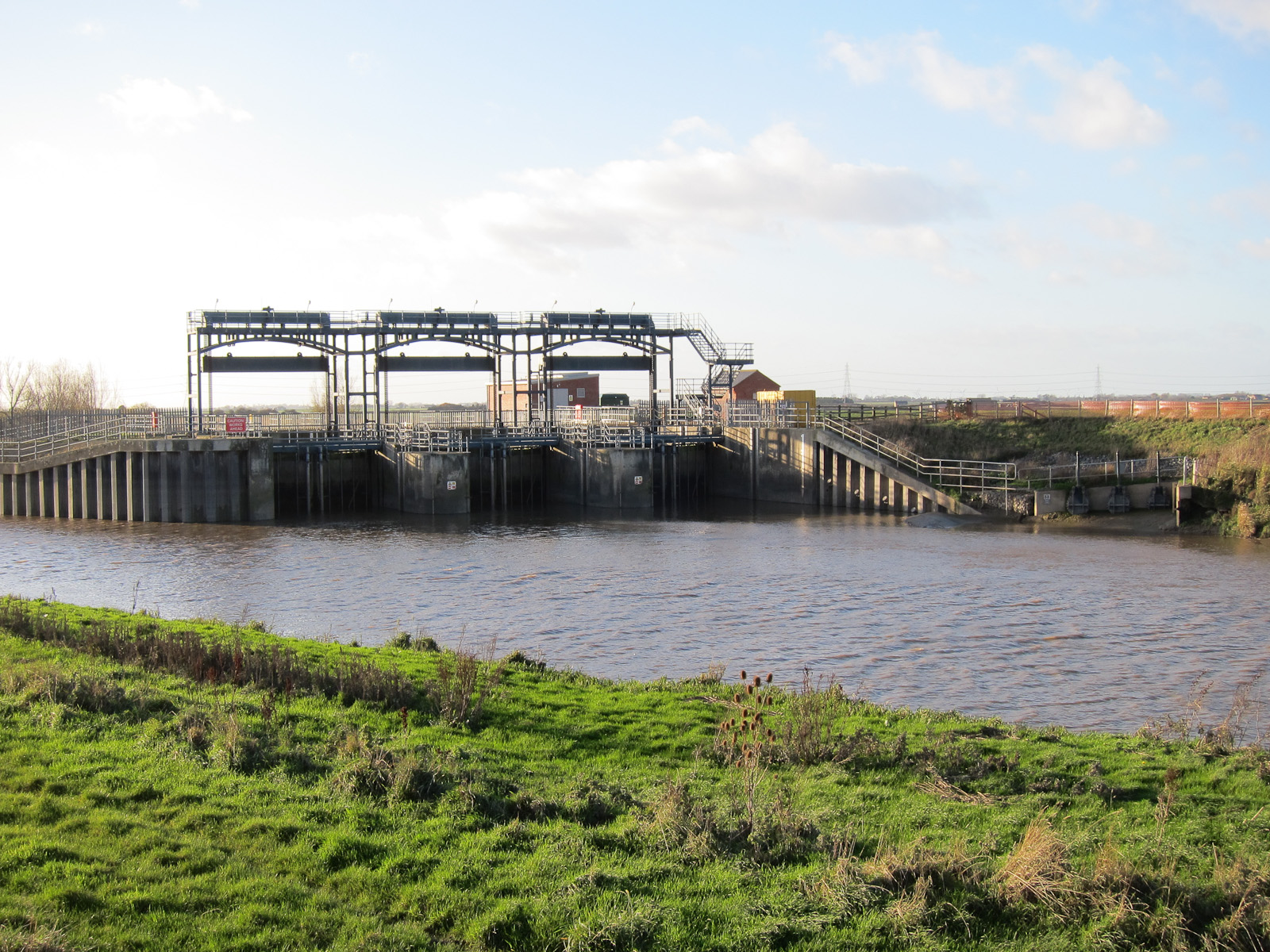
The outlet of Welmore Lake Sluice into the New Bedford River

Some of the workers who built the New Bedford River may have been Scottish prisoners-of-war captured at the Battle of Dunbar, since a number of such prisoners were used on drainage schemes in the Fens, because labourers were scarce. After 1652, they were supplemented by Dutch prisoners, as a result of sea battles between Admiral Blake and Lieutenant-Admiral Tromp during the First Anglo-Dutch War, and probably by a colony of French workers stationed near Thorney Abbey.

Towards the northern end of the washes, the New Bedford River is joined by the River Delph at Welmore Lake Sluice. The origins of this channel, which is sometimes called the thirty-foot drain, are obscure, although it was built to assist the removal of water from the washlands, according to C. N. Cole writing in 1784. Prior to 1825, there was a dam where the sluice is located, and water was let out of the washland by cutting a slot in it, which the flood water enlarged as it passed through. The cost of rebuilding the dam at the end of the process was considerable, and this unsatisfactory arrangement was replaced by a sluice. At the same time, the New Bedford River was made wider and deeper, while some of the flood banks were also raised. At its southern end, the River Delph is connected to the Old Bedford River at a double bend near Welches Dam. The northern half of the Old Bedford River is no longer connected to its southern half. It is not known exactly when this configuration was built, although it may have been between 1789 and 1821, since Cole's map of 1789 shows the Old Bedford River proceeding in a straight line, and Baker's map of 1821 shows two rivers, each with a double bend. Blair argues for a date soon after the New Bedford River was built, however, since Welches Dam is named after Edmund Welche, who worked with Vermuyden, and the dam in question was originally built across the Old Bedford River.

== Course ==
The New Bedford River follows a fairly straight course, heading approximately north-east for 20.8 miles (33.5 km) from Earith to Denver Sluice. While there are no real restrictions on the length or width of boats, draught is limited to 2 feet (0.6 m) and headroom to 7.8 feet (2.4 m), although the river is tidal, and so these values can fluctuate depending on the state of the tide. The Environment Agency advise that navigating up the river is best attempted when there is a tide of at least 24 feet (7.3 m) at King's Lynn, and boats should enter the river at Denver soon after the tide turns. Water levels tend to rise steeply for about two hours after the tide turns, and then drop gradually over the next ten hours. Care is needed to ensure that boats remain in the centre of the channel, particularly during the winter months when the river may be overflowing into the Ouse Washes. Despite being some 35 miles (56 km) from the sea, water levels at Earith still rise and fall by about 2 feet (0.6 m) on a spring tide, and by a few inches for a neap tide.

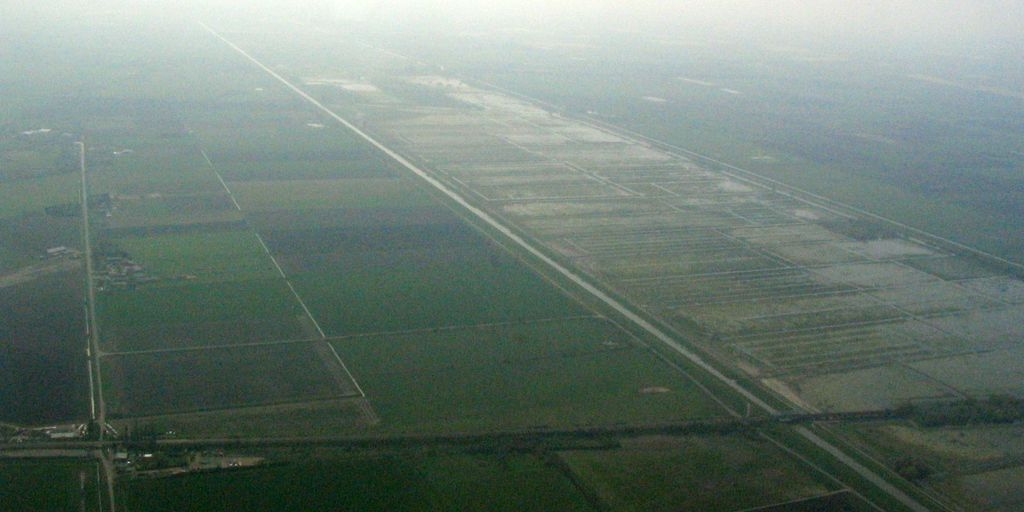
Aerial view of the New (middle diagonal grey line) and Old (right diagonal grey line) Bedford Rivers crossed by the Ely-March railway (bottom dark line)

The area between the two Bedford Rivers, 20 miles (32 km) long and 1,070 yards (980 m) wide at their greatest separation near Welney, is below the rivers and below sea level, and is frequently flooded during winter. There is a sluice at Earith which is used to control the waters of the River Great Ouse. It was built with nine openings in 1637, but was subsequently rebuilt with seven openings in 1824, and again with three openings in 1954. When flows in the upper river are normal, the sluice gates are closed, and most of the flow is routed along the tidal New Bedford River. As flows increase, the sluices are opened, and water flows along the Old Bedford River, which progressively floods the 8.9 square miles (23 km^{2}) of washlands which comprise the Ouse Washes. At Welney, these washes provide an ideal habitat for wildfowl and other birds, and the Wildfowl and Wetlands Trust has established a nature reserve here, the WWT Welney. The reserve occupies 990 acres (400 ha), and is accessible from the A1101 bridge by following a minor road to the carpark, and then crossing the New Bedford River by a footbridge. It is important for its wild flowers, dragonflies and butterflies, as well as the birds, which are most numerous when the washland is flooded.

There are public footpaths on both sides of the river for most of its length, the only exception being a short section of the western bank near Earith. A long-distance footpath called the Hereward Way crosses the river by the A1101 bridge at Welney, and then follows the eastern bank southwards almost to the March to Ely railway line. It turns to the east a little before the bridge, following the north bank of the Engine Basin, a drainage channel which is pumped into the river by the Hundred Foot Pumping Station.

== Land drainage ==
The area between the New Bedford River and the Great Ouse now lies at an average of 6.6 feet (2 m) below mean sea level, and three times that distance below the highest levels that tides normally reach. The low lying land is managed by the Littleport and Downham Internal Drainage Board, the successors to the Littleport and Downham Drainage Commissioners which were established by Act of Parliament in 1756. This act enabled the land to be enclosed, and the district has relied on pumped drainage ever since. The board are now responsible for 32,242 acres (13,048 ha) of fen land. Water from the district is pumped into the New Bedford River by the Hundred Foot and Oxlode pumping stations, and into the Great Ouse by the Ten Mile, Moors, and Wood Fen pumping stations.

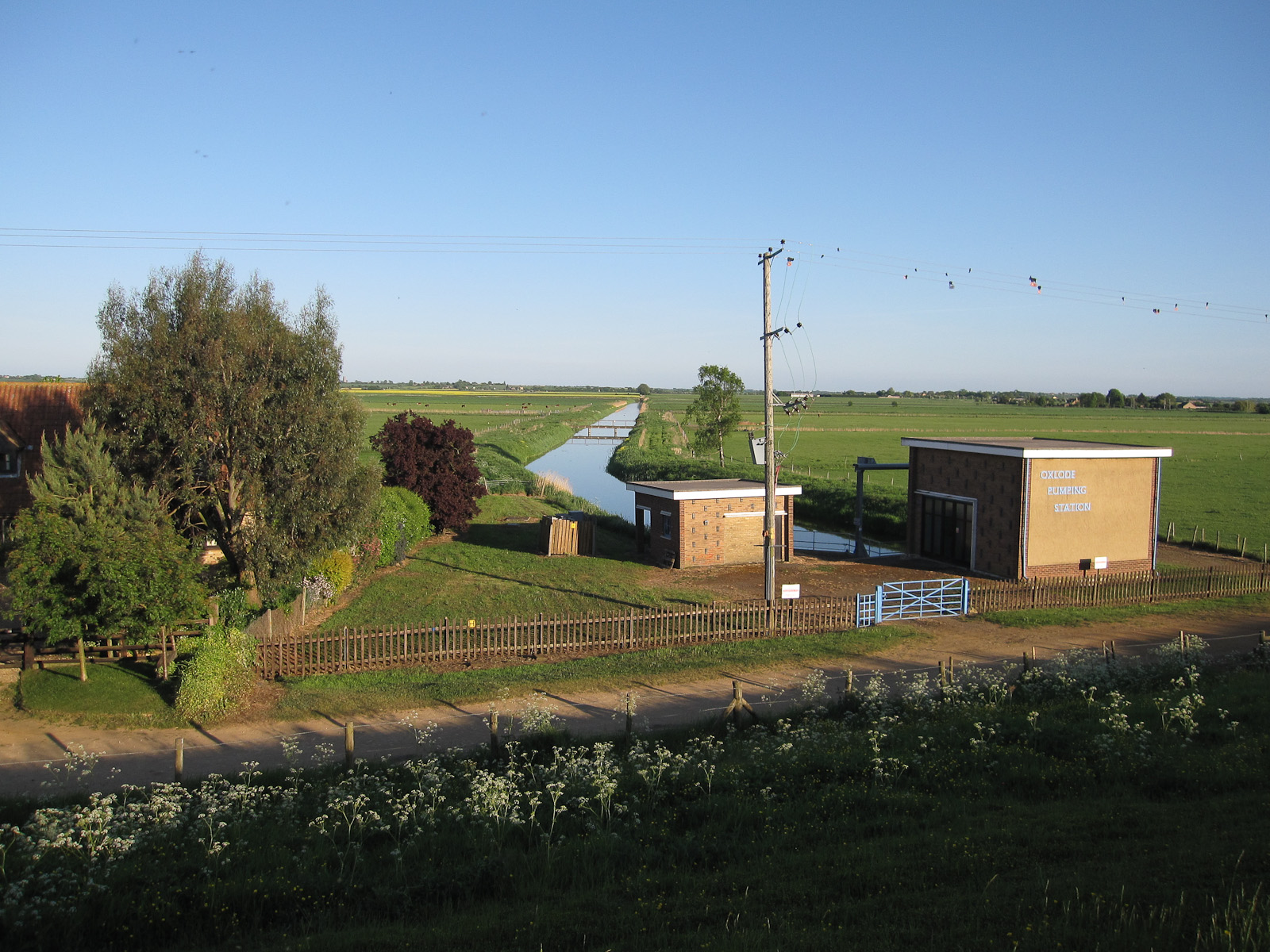
Oxlode pumping station on the banks of the New Bedford River

The 1756 act was consolidated by further Acts of Parliament obtained in 1800 and 1810. By the early 1800s, drainage was achieved by 80 wind pumps, but in 1818, the first steam-powered pumping station was built at Ten Mile Bank, by the Great Ouse. This was followed in 1830 by the Hundred Foot pumping station on the banks of the New Bedford River. It replaced Westmoor Mills, where two wind pumps raised the water in two stages. The new plant consisted of a beam engine manufactured by the Butterley Company and rated at 80 hp (60 kW). Steam was produced by two boilers, with a third added in November 1843. Butterley replaced the first two boilers in 1869, and James Watt replaced the third in 1875. They were all replaced by high pressure Lancashire boilers in 1911. Originally, the engine drove a scoop wheel which was 37.4 feet (11.4 m) in diameter, but in 1881 this was replaced by the largest scoop wheel used in the Fens, which was 50 feet (15 m) in diameter. There were continual problems with the land levels dropping due to shrinkage of the peat, resulting in the intake needing to be lowered. The beam engine was replaced by a 400 hp (300 kW) vertical steam engine manufactured by Gwynnes in 1914, linked to a 50-inch (130 cm) Gwynnes pump. In 1926, a Mirlees diesel engine was installed to supplement the steam engine, until that was replaced by a Ruston and Hornsby diesel engine in 1951. In 1965, the Mirlees engine was sold, and a new electric station was built in 1985, although the Ruston engine and the 1911 boilers were retained.

The electric station contains three submersible pumps, one of which failed in December 2012, after a period of heavy rain. With water levels in Pymoor Drain rising to record levels, the Ruston diesel engine was mended and pressed into service on 24 December. At the same time, the Oxlode pumping station suffered from the failure of a gate valve in a separate incident, resulting in one of the two pumps not being available for use. Plans for a pumping station at Oxlode were originally announced in 1940, but it is unclear when it was opened, as a new pumping station was commissioned in July 1944, but newspapers did not print its name, due to wartime censorship. A second pumping station with two electric pumps was opened in May 1962, at a cost of £65,000. Each pump could discharge 270 tons of water per minute into the New Bedford River, but the existing two diesel pumps were retained. Prior to the opening ceremony, the Drainage Commissioners held a celebration lunch at the Club Hotel, Ely, where their predecessors had met for the first time in 1756.

== Water quality ==
The Environment Agency measure the water quality of the river systems in England. Each is given an overall ecological status, which may be one of five levels: high, good, moderate, poor and bad. There are several components that are used to determine this, including biological status, which looks at the quantity and varieties of invertebrates, angiosperms and fish. Chemical status, which compares the concentrations of various chemicals against known safe concentrations, is rated good or fail.

The water quality of the New Bedford River and the lower Great Ouse was as follows in 2019.

Section	Ecological Status	Chemical Status	Length	Catchment	Channel
Great Ouse	Poor	Fail			heavily modified

The water quality is less than good mainly due to physical modification of the channel for flood protection. Like most rivers in the UK, the chemical status changed from good to fail in 2019, due to the presence of polybrominated diphenyl ethers (PBDE) and mercury compounds, neither of which had previously been included in the assessment.

== Bibliography ==
- Blair, Andrew Hunter (2006a). The River Great Ouse and tributaries. Imray Laurie Norie and Wilson Ltd. ISBN 978-0-85288-943-5.
- Blair, Andrew Hunter (2006b). Fenland Waterways. Imray Laurie Norie and Wilson Ltd. ISBN 978-0-85288-994-7.
- Boyes, John; Russell, Ronald (1977). The Canals of Eastern England. David and Charles. ISBN 978-0-7153-7415-3.
- Cumberlidge, Jane (2009). Inland Waterways of Great Britain (8th Ed.). Imray Laurie Norie and Wilson. ISBN 978-1-84623-010-3.
- Darby, H.C. (2011) [1958]. The Draining of the Fens. Cambridge University Press. ISBN 978-1-107-40298-0.
- Hinde, K S G (2006). Fenland Pumping Engines. Landmark Publishing. ISBN 978-1-84306-188-5.
- Holmes, Peter (March 2005). The Hundred Foot. Waterways World. ISSN 0309-1422.
- King, Elaine (8 January 2013). "Broken drainage pumps led to dramatically high levels of water in Pymoor drain". Ely Standard. Archived from the original on 7 May 2021.
- Petty, Mike (31 August 2016). "Cambridgeshire Fen Drainage Scrapbook 1897 to 1990". Mike Petty.
