= Old Bedford River =

Watercourse in Cambridgeshire, England

Coordinates: 52°21′10″N 0°02′39″E

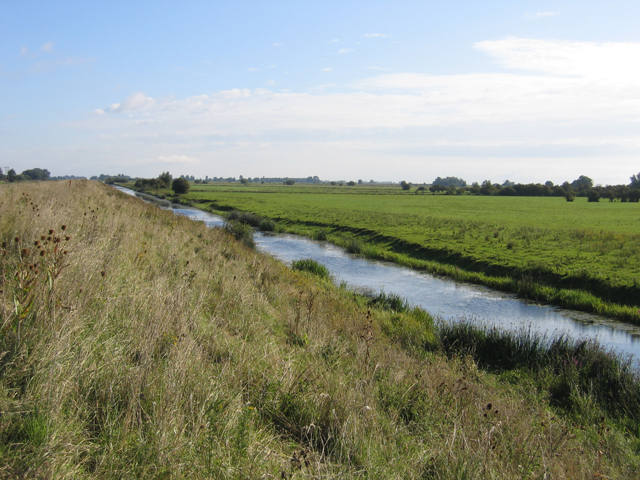
- A section of the Old Bedford River near Mepal
- Interactive map of Old Bedford River

Specifications
- Length: 21 miles (34 km)
- Status: Part navigable
- Navigation authority: Environment Agency

History
- Principal engineer: Cornelius Vermuyden

Geography
- Start point: Earith
- End point: Denver, Norfolk
- Connects to: River Great Ouse

The Old Bedford River is an artificial, partial diversion of the waters of the River Great Ouse in the Fens of Cambridgeshire, England. It was named after the fourth Earl of Bedford who contracted with the local commission of sewers to drain the Great Level of the Fens beginning in 1630. It provided a steeper and shorter path for the waters of the Great Ouse, and was embanked to prevent them flooding the low ground of the South Fens. Throughout the project, the Earl and his Adventurers faced disruption from those who were opposed to drainage schemes. The project was deemed to have succeeded in draining the fens in 1637, but that decision was reversed in 1638. After a lull during the English Civil War, when much of the work was damaged, the Dutch engineer Cornelius Vermuyden worked with William Russell, the fifth Earl of Bedford to complete the drainage. Disruption and unrest continued while the work was carried out, resulting in the Adventurers employing armed guards. A second river, the New Bedford River, was cut parallel to the first channel, which then became the Old Bedford River. At some point, the Old Bedford River was split into two parts, when the upper section was diverted into the River Delph at Welches Dam, and the lower section was joined to the Counter Drain. Both parts retain the name, but are not connected to each other - i.e. southwest of Welches Dam, the northern channel is named the Counter Drain and the southern channel is named the Old Bedford River; northeast of the dam, the channels are named the Old Bedford River and the River Delph, respectively. The area between the two Bedford rivers acts as a large washland, which holds floodwater when the river channels cannot cope with the volume of water in them.

The river acts as the outlet for a number of land drainage projects. Three internal drainage boards are located along its banks, and there are several pumping stations which pump water from low-lying fens into the Counter Drain and the lower section of the Old Bedford River. At the junction with the Great Ouse is Old Bedford Sluice, through which the water passes to reach the tidal river, but this is not always possible, particularly when high volumes of water are passing down the New Bedford River as a result of heavy rainfall further up the Great Ouse. To resolve this, a pumping station was built at Welches Dam in 1948, to pump water from the Counter Drain and lower Old Bedford River into the River Delph, which runs parallel to the lower river for most of it length, but then crosses the washland to enter the New Bedford River at Welmore Lake Sluice. When pumping occurs, flow in the lower river above Welney is reversed, and a vertical sluice gate prevents water discharged into the river by the Upwell Internal Drainage Board from reaching the pumping station.

The river is navigable from Welches Dam to Old Bedford Sluice, but passage through the sluice can only be made when tidal water levels allow, as there is no lock. Welches Dam Lock used to provide a link from the Middle Level Navigations to the Great Ouse, which was the only link between the two river systems when Well Creek became unnavigable. However, a campaign to save Well Creek from being filled in was successful, and the recommended transfer route follows the old course of the River Nene and Well Creek to Salters Lode Lock at Denver. In 2006, the Environment Agency closed Welches Dam Lock, and despite campaigns for it to be reinstated, it has remained closed. There are proposals as part of the Fens Waterways Link which could result in more of the Old Bedford River becoming navigable, in order to provide a circular cruising route including parts of the Great Ouse and the Middle Level Navigations.

== History ==
The idea of an artificial river running, as the Old Bedford River does, from Earith to Denver was not a new idea; it had been proposed as early as 1604 by the engineer John Hunt. At a meeting of the Commissioners of Sewers held at King's Lynn on 1 September 1630, they asked the Dutch drainage engineer Cornelius Vermuyden to implement a drainage scheme for the southern fens, known as the Great Level. He would fund the work himself, but would receive 90,000 acres (36,000 ha) of the drained land in recognition of his investment. Vermuyden produced plans for the work, but wanted 95,000 acres (38,000 ha) of land. However, the Commissioners were not willing to increase the area of land, and so asked the Earl of Bedford if he would undertake the work, to which he agreed. He would be given six years to complete the work. Despite their earlier reluctance to increase the area of land awarded for carrying out the work, the Earl would receive 95,000 acres (38,000 ha). Of this, 40,000 acres (16,000 ha) would be used to fund ongoing maintenance of the drainage works, 12,000 acres (4,900 ha) would be given to the King, and the remaining 43,000 acres (17,000 ha) would be for the Earl of Bedford. He and 13 other adventurers were granted a charter in 1634, creating a Corporation.

Once the project started, the Earl of Bedford engaged Vermuyden to design the works. At the time, many thought that any solution should involve making existing rivers wider and deeper, whereas Vermuyden was an advocate of new straight channels, designed to increase the gradient of a river, and it was this view that prevailed. The result was the construction of the Bedford River, around 21 miles (34 km) long, and running in a straight line from a sluice near Earith to another near Salters Lode. The Bedford River was around 70 feet (21 m) wide, and was the main channel constructed. It provided a route for the waters of the Great Ouse which was considerably shorter and steeper than the existing route via Stretham and Ely. The project, which also included cutting or improving eight other drains, was financed by the Earl of Bedford and several other investors. It was undertaken between 1630 and 1636, but although the work carried out may have been based on Vermuyden's plans, there is no firm evidence that he was involved as the supervising engineer.

Prior to work starting, those who objected to the scheme had, among other things, composed "libellous songs to disparage the work", but once construction began, things got much worse. The objectors destroyed dykes as they were erected, filled in channels that had been dug, and opened sluices to flood the land. There were frequent riots, with those carrying out the work attempting to drive cattle from the fens, and crowds armed with scythes and pitchforks attempting to stop them. Tracts and pamphlets were produced by both parties in the confrontation. William Hayward made a detailed survey of the Great Level in 1636, from which it could be seen that the works were only partly completed. However, in 1637, the Commission of Sewers met at St Ives, and stated that the work outlined in the original agreement had been largely finished. Part of the reasoning may have been that several of the adventurers were almost bankrupt, and the decision gave them the land that had been agreed. Numerous complaints were then received by the Privy Council, which turned the king against the Earl of Bedford and his Corporation. It was recognised that much of the Great Level was improved, but the drainage was patchy, and therefore the adventurers had failed to drain the Great Level. On 12 April 1638, the project was deemed to be defective. Later that year, on 18 July, the king was declared as the undertaker who would ensure that the level was drained.

Vermuyden was involved in this second scheme, for which a few works were begun in 1638, but his main plans were not published until 1642. In this period, unrest among those who lived in the Fens, and felt that they no longer had access to what has previously been common land, did not abate. There were disturbances in Whelpmore Fen, near Littleport, and in 1638, threats to break down Ely prison to free those who had been arrested were taken seriously enough that it was guarded during the night. Oliver Cromwell became an advocate for those who had been dispossessed, although he was not against drainage in general, but only the injustices that accompanied it. Activity on the Bedford Levels ceased when the English Civil War began in 1642, and people used the confusion of that period to destroy many of the drainage works.

=== Second phase ===
Although activity ceased, planning did not. Proposals to drain the Great Level were submitted to Parliament in August 1645, and although progress was slow, in part due to a huge number of objections, they resulted in an act of Parliament being passed on 29 May 1649. This empowered William Russell, the fifth Earl of Bedford and some adventurers to drain the Great Level, without disrupting navigation on the rivers, and to make them into "winter ground". They had until 10 October 1656 to complete the work. "Winter ground" would be suitable for growing crops such as coleseed, rapeseed, corn, grain, hemp and flax, as well as providing pasture for cattle. Despite the act, the undertakers did not have a clear plan of what they would do to achieve the drainage, but were hoping that they could include the works of the Fourth Earl of Bedford. Several engineers made suggestions, but only Vermuyden had a clear plan and workmen to complete the work. As a result, he became the project director on 25 January 1650, despite not being popular particularly with his colleagues.

He split the Great Level into three, which were later known as the North Level, the Middle Level and the South Level, with the Bedford River forming the divide between the Middle Level and the South Level. Work began of the North and Middle Levels first, with the existing drainage works being restored, and new embanking and sluices constructed. In the South Level, the New Bedford River was cut, running parallel to the original Bedford River, which was renamed the Old Bedford River. This was around 0.5 miles (0.8 km) to the east of the Old Bedford River, and was known as the Hundred Foot River. It became the main channel for the upland waters of the Great Ouse. Water was diverted into it, instead of along the Old Bedford River, by the Severn Holes Sluice, at the start of the Old Bedford River. A high barrier bank was constructed to the west of the Old Bedford River, and another to the east of the New Bedford River, so that in times of flood, the intervening space between the rivers would be inundated, but the surrounding land would not. This vast washland is known as the Ouse Washes.

Earlier disruption of the work was repeated, with attempts to destroy the newly created banks, and the adventurers resorting to using armed guards to protect their work. Frequent complaints were made to Parliament, and eventually, it became difficult to obtain labourers. After the Battle of Dunbar some of the workers were Scottish prisoners, and their numbers were swelled by Dutch prisoners after the Battle of Dover. The works in the North and Middle Levels, to the north-west of the Old Bedford River, were judged to be completed on 26 March 1651, and a second judgement took place at Ely in March 1652, when the South Level was signed off. A service of thanksgiving took place in Ely Cathedral, to celebrate the completion of the work. Attempts were made to create a formal organisation to ensure the works were maintained, and this resulted in the creation of the Bedford Level Corporation under the terms of the General Drainage Act 1663.

=== River Delph ===
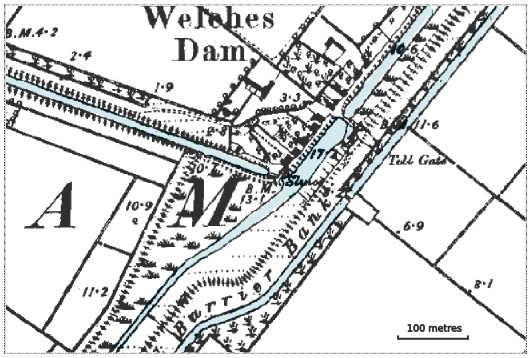
1892 map of Old Bedford River and River Delph at Welches Dam, showing flood bank

Vermuyden's Drain or the Forty Foot Drain was constructed in 1651 to drain fenland to the north of Chatteris. It was joined by the Cranbrook Drain just before it joined the Old Bedford River at Welches Dam. There is a third channel between the Bedford Rivers, which is now known as the River Delph. It begins near where Vermuyden's Drain ends, and runs parallel to the Old Bedford River for most of its length, before crossing the washland to join the New Bedford River at Welmore Lake Sluice, 1.75 miles (2.8 km) above Denver Sluice. Its history is obscure, as its construction does not appear to have been documented. It was built some time after the Bedford Rivers, and at some point, a bend was added to the Old Bedford River at Welches Dam. This probably occurred after 1789, when C. N. Cole's map of the Bedford Level showed the original straight course, and before 1821, when R. G. Baker's map of Cambridgeshire showed it with the bend. Blair offers an explanation, although he admits that it is conjectural. After Vermuyden's Drain was cut, it was found that water could flow up the Old Bedford River, rather than down it towards Denver. Edmund Welche, an engineer who worked with Vermuyden, then built a dam across the Old Bedford River just upstream of the junction. This resulted in water flowing down the Old Bedford River flooding the washes, and so the River Delph was cut. The Old Bedford River was slewed sideways to join the new channel, and a bank was built between the Delph and the downstream portion of the Old Bedford River to maintain the integrity of the washland. Cole writing in 1784 stated that the purpose of the Delph was to make emptying of the washland easier. This has resulted in the Old Bedford River having two sections, which are not connected together. The upstream section flows down from Earith to Welches Dam, and then flows into the River Delph. The Counter drain which runs to the west of the upstream section has a similar kink in it where it joins Vermuyden's Drain, and they then flow into the downstream section of the Old Bedford River, which joins the tidal Great Ouse at Old Bedford Sluice near Denver.

Welmore Lake Sluice was originally built as a dam by the proprietors of the Washlands, with the aim of preventing spring tides and small floods from entering the washlands. When an act of Parliament was obtained in 1812 to authorise further embanking of the Hundred Feet Washes, the unsatisfactory nature of its operation was explained. When there were high floods, a small channel was cut through the dam, and the water scoured out a larger channel. Once the floods had subsided, the Bedford Corporation had to rebuild the dam to restore its previous function. This was an expensive process, and was resolved in 1825 when the Welmore Lake Sluice was constructed to replace the dam. At around the same time, the Nine Holes Sluice at the upstream end of the Old Bedford River was replaced by the present Seven Holes Sluice and bridge. This was constructed by the Hundreds Foot Wash Commissioners, and carries the inscription "H.W.C. 1824". The sluice at the downstream end of the Old Bedford River was also rebuilt prior to 1828. The operation of the sluice at the downstream end was problematic for many years. Together with the sluice at Denver on the old course of the Great Ouse and that at Salters Lode on the outfall from the Middle Level, it prevented tides moving further upstream. The sluice gates were opened when the water level on the downstream side dropped below an agreed level, but in times of heavy rainfall, the water levels were swelled by the mass of water passing from the upland Great Ouse down the New Bedford River. This prevented the doors of the sluices being opened for days at a time, with water backing up in the respective rivers.

=== Land drainage ===
Artificial drainage of low-lying wetlands generally involves one or both of two different practices: excluding water flowing from high areas from entering the low-lying area, and pumping out water which does manage to get into the low-lying area. The Old Bedford River was constructed on the first principle, as were most of the drainage works constructed in the seventeenth century in the English fens. Both the Old Bedford River and the New Bedford River were intended to reduce or eliminate flooding of the fens of the South Level by carrying the bulk of the water from the Great Ouse River from the uplands of Huntingdonshire to the sea in a straight channel, rather than allowing it to meander across the fens of the South Level. Both now have pumping stations on their banks, and receive water which is pumped from lower lying land.

Mepal pumping station is the outlet for the Sutton and Mepal internal drainage board. The drainage district was created in 1749 by the Isle of Ely Drainage Act 1748 (22 Geo. 2. c. 11), and covered an area of 10,500 acres (42 km^{2}). Pumping was performed by six wind pumps driving scoop wheels, but these were replaced in 1840 by a beam engine manufactured by the Butterley Company and rated at 80 hp (60 kW). It drove a scoop wheel which was 34 feet (10 m) in diameter, discharging into the Counter Drain. The beam engine was replaced in 1926 by two Vickers-Petter two-stroke hot-bulb diesel engines, driving 42-inch (110 cm) Gwynnes pumps. One of these engines was replaced by a Brush diesel engine in 1939, after it disintegrated while being started. The other was replaced by a Ruston five-cylinder diesel engine in 1947, which was connected to the 1927 pump by V-belts. The station was upgraded in 1994, when electric pumps were fitted, but the Ruston engine was retained as a backup. The Sutton and Mepal district did not want to become part of the Middle Level in 1848, as it already head its own pumping engine, but more recently, it has been managed by the Middle Level Commissioners.

The Manea and Welney District Drainage Commissioners are the successors to another drainage district, created by the Fen Drainage Act 1758 (32 Geo. 2. c. 13) and the Althorpe Inclosure Act 1799 (39 Geo. 3. c. 90 Pr.). It originally contained 8,685 acres (3,515 ha) of fenland, and like the Sutton and Mepal District, the commissioners declined to become part of the district created by the Middle Level Drainage and Navigation Act 1844 (7 & 8 Vict. c. cvi), as they had installed a pumping engine in 1842. This was a Butterley beam engine, rated at 60 hp (45 kW), which replaced several wind pumps. It drove a 32-foot (9.8 m) diameter scoop wheel, and the installation included three Lancashire boilers. This was replaced by two Vickers-Petters 2-stroke hot bulb diesel engines in 1923, each producing 180 hp (130 kW) and driving a 36-inch (91 cm) centrifugal pump manufactured by Gwynnes. These were upgraded to Ruston and Hornsby 4-stroke diesel engines in 1948, again driving Gwynnes 36-inch (91 cm) pumps, developing 295 hp (220 kW). The engines were still in situ in 2013, but since 1997 pumping has been performed by four 6-cylinder diesel engines manufactured by Perkins and driving 24-inch (600 mm) submersible pumps. This station is now known as Glenhouse pumping station, after the house built for the engine driver in 1907.

The Manea and Welney District Drainage Commissioners are now responsible for an area of 7,665 acres (3,102 ha), in which they maintain 25.5 miles (41 km) of waterways and operate three pumpings stations. These are shown as Purls Bridge, Welches Dam and Glenhouse on their district plan. Purls Bridge pumping station is located downstream of Purls Bridge farm, and consists of an Allen-Gwynnes electric pump in a small brick building, installed some time after 1975. Details of the Welches Dam pumping station are less clear, as there was a diesel engine and pump in a wooden building at Old Mill Drove from the 1920s, but this became disused around 1975. The pumping station is shown at Old Mill Drove.

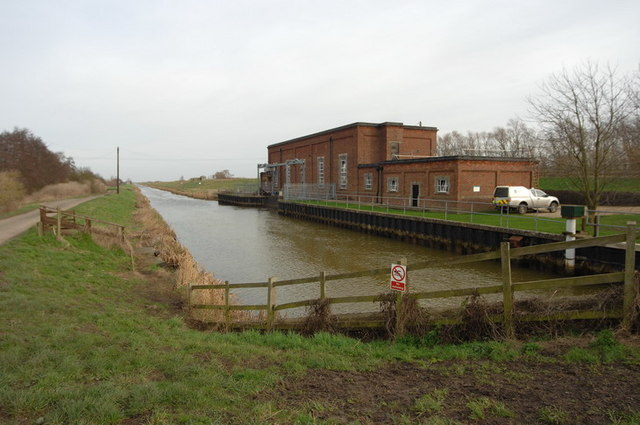
The pumping station at Welches Dam pumps excess water into the River Delph when the Old Bedford River cannot discharge through the Old Bedford Sluice.

Two further pumping stations at Cock Fen and Upwell Fen are operated by Upwell Internal Drainage Board. This district was created by an act of Parliament in 1801, and consisted of two parts, on either side of Popham's Eau. It covers an area of 11,978 acres (4,847 ha) and the board manage 45 miles (72 km) of watercourses and operate five pumping stations. Nordelph pumping station discharges into Popham's Eau, while Padgets Corner and Bedlam Bridge pumping stations discharge into the Sixteen Foot Drain, part of the Middle Level system. Cock Fen pumping station was built in 1975, after it became impossible to drain the area by gravity to the north or west. The rectangular brick building houses diesel pumps. The final pumping station is on the right bank of the Old Bedford River. Lake Farm pumping station is a small, privately owned installation, which drains a small part of the Ouse Washes.

There is another pumping station at Welches Dam, which pumps water from the Counter Drain and lower Old Bedford River through the Middle Level Barrier Bank and into the River Delph. This was constructed in the 1940s and commissioned in December 1948. It was designed by W. F. Pattison, the Mechanical Engineer of the Great Ouse Catchment Board, who died prior to the completion of the project. The catchment board wanted to prevent water in the lower Old Bedford River overflowing its banks, particularly when the Old Bedford Sluice was blocked by higher water levels in the tidal Great Ouse. A pumping station was seen as a cheaper option than raising the banks of the river for its entire length, and siting it at Welches Dam, between the outflow of the Manea and Welney District Drainage Commissioners and the Sutton and Mepal Internal Drainage Board, meant that the head against which the water had to be pumped was less than it would have been if it had been situated near the Old Bedford Sluice. It was sized to pump 750 tons per minute, based on each of the drainage districts producing 300 tons per minute and a flow of 150 tons per minute from the higher areas of land into Cranbrook Drain. This was achieved by installing two Allen diesel engines and pumps. One of the diesel engines was replaced by a Perkins engine in 1998, which was connected to the original pump by a reduction gearbox. The Allen engine was sold, and both pumpsets lasted until 2011, when the second Allen engine was given to the Internal Fire Museum of Power, based at Tanygroes, Ceredigion. The diesel engines were replaced by electrical pumps, supplied by Bedford Pumps, but the maximum amount of power available meant that the total output of the station was reduced by around one fifth.

When the Welches Dam pumping station is operating, flow in the Old Bedford River above Glenhouse pumping station is reversed. When the Upwell Internal Drainage Board wanted to discharge water into the lower Old Bedford River, the Great Ouse River Authority, successors to the Catchment Board, required them to pay for the installation of a sluice further upstream, so that Welches Dam pumping station would not be overwhelmed by the additional volumes of water. The sluice consists of a single vertical sluice gate located just downstream of Welney Bridge. It was built by the Great Ouse River Authority and commissioned in 1973, prior to the Upwell pumping stations being built.

== Navigation ==
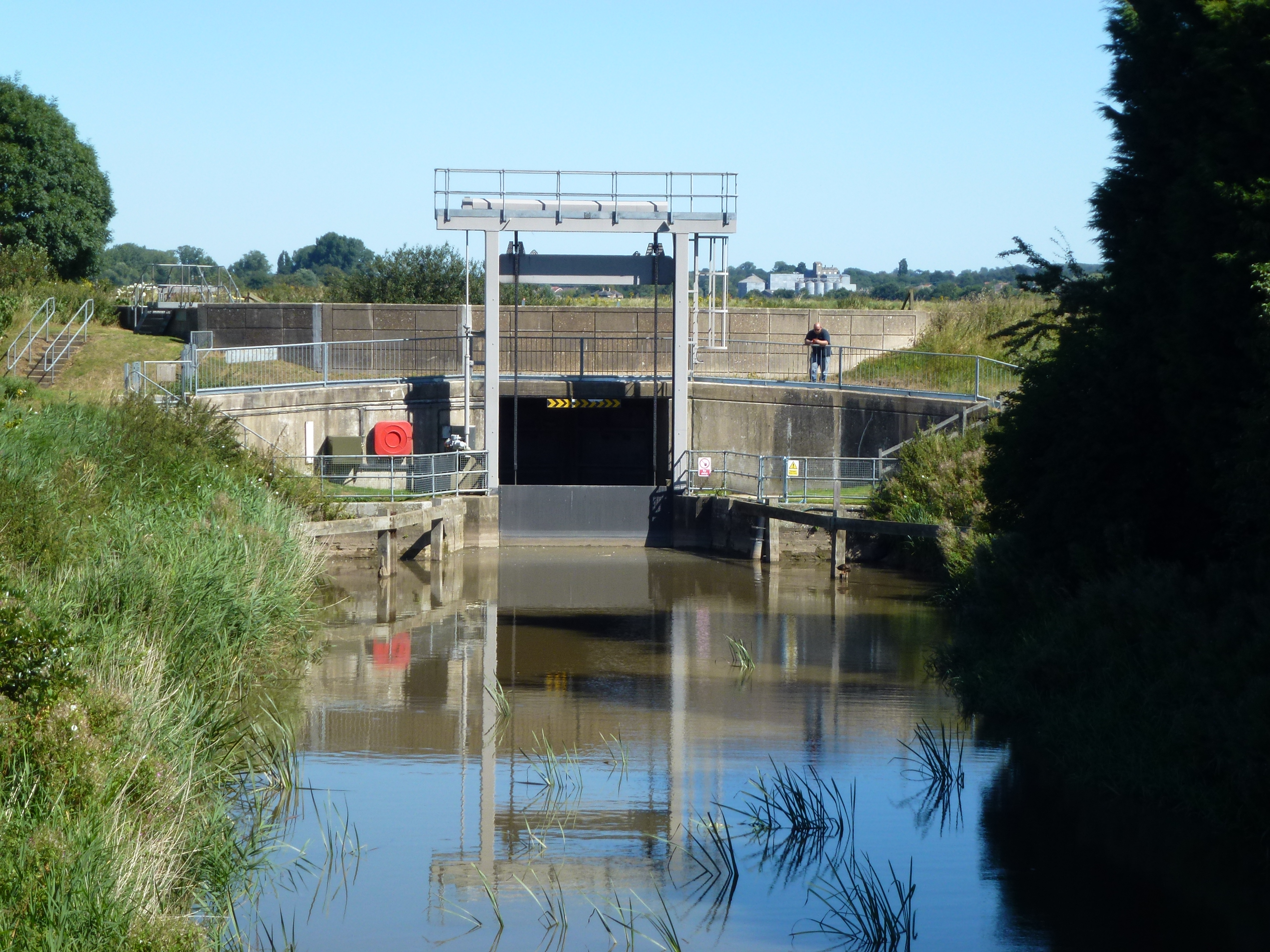
The Old Bedford Sluice, through which boats must pass to access the River Great Ouse.

The Old Bedford River is navigable between Welches Dam Lock and the Old Bedford Sluice. For a time it was part of the only route between the River Nene and the Great Ouse via the Middle Levels. Well Creek became impassable after commercial carrying ended on the Middle Levels in the 1940s, and Norfolk County Council wanted to fill it in to use part of the course for a road diversion in 1959. This was the start of campaigning to reopen it, resulting in the Well Creek Trust being formed in 1970, and Well Creek was reopened in 1975. The route along the Old River Nene and Well Creek to Salters Lode Lock then became the recommended route to transfer between the two river systems. The use of Welches Dam Lock and the Old Bedford River was subsequently restricted to certain weekends by the Environment Agency, who now manage the waterway.

In 2006, the Environment Agency closed Welches Dam Lock, drained the channel from there to the Middle Levels' Horseway Lock, and blocked off the lock entrance with piling. Since then, the Inland Waterways Association have campaigned for it to be reopened, but with no success. In 2018, they organised a campaign cruise along the Old Bedford River, to highlight the issue. Access through the Old Bedford Sluice is only possible near low water during neap tides, and is further hampered by silting of the short channel below the sluice. Four narrow boats attempted to pass through the sluice, but only one succeeded. Once on the Old Bedford River, it was joined by a canoe, a kayak and a dinghy. After an overnight stop at Welney, the flotilla continued through Welney Sluice, and despite some problems with weed growth, reached Welches Dam by around midday, where they were greeted by a television news cameraman and crews from the other boats which had not successfully negotiated the Old Bedford Sluice. The return passage through the sluice was somewhat easier.

One solution proposed by Project Hereward, an umbrella organisation for a number of local waterways groups, is to raise the water level in the Welches Dam to Horseway Lock channel, so that it is level with the Old Bedford River. This would overcome the problem of Welches Dam Lock being very small, at only 46 feet (14 m) long. A small change to the upper gates at Horseway Lock would be required to accommodate the change in level. Project Hereward estimated the cost of this work to be £3 million in 2018, but the Environment Agency costed it at £9 million.

Modification to the Old Bedford River has been proposed as part of the Fens Waterways Link. In addition to an inland waterway from Boston to Peterborough, the project includes a circular route which includes sections of the Middle Level Navigations and the Great Ouse from Denver to Earith. The missing link is the section from Earith back to the Middle Level Navigations, for which three options have been proposed. One was to build an aqueduct to carry boats from Welches Dam over the Old Bedford River and into the tidal New Bedford River, which joins the Great Ouse above Hermitage Lock. The second was to build a new lock between Welches Dam and the Old Bedford River. The section above Welches Dam to the sluice at Earith would be enlarged so that it became navigable, and a new lock structure would be built to bypass Earith Sluice. The third option involved making the Twenty Foot River navigable towards Chatteris. This then becomes Fenton's Lode, and the new route would follow Fenton's Lode to High Fen pumping station. A new section of canal would run from the pumping station to a drainage ditch called Cranbrook Drain, which would be enlarged and join the Old Bedford River below Earith Sluice. Upgrading of the final section of the Old Bedford River would be required, and again, a lock structure to bypass Earith Sluice would be needed. The second route was the preferred option in 2003, although Lincolnshire County Council still showed all three routes on their 2018 Waterways Development Strategy document.

== Water quality ==
The Environment Agency measure the water quality of the river systems in England. Each is given an overall ecological status, which may be one of five levels: high, good, moderate, poor and bad. There are several components that are used to determine this, including biological status, which looks at the quantity and varieties of invertebrates, angiosperms and fish. Chemical status, which compares the concentrations of various chemicals against known safe concentrations, is rated good or fail.

The water quality of the Old Bedford River and River Delph, which includes the Ouse Washes, was as follows in 2019.

Section	Ecological Status	Chemical Status	Length	Catchment	Channel
Old Bedford River / River Delph (inc The Hundred Foot Washes)	Moderate	Fail	18.8 miles (30.3 km)	8.15 square miles (21.1 km^{2})	artificial

The water quality in the river has deteriorated since 2014, when it was rated good for ecological status. This is partly due to the fact that dissolved oxygen levels are now included in the assessment. Other reasons for the quality being less than good are low flow and physical modification of the channel, which is managed for flood protection. Both of these factors affect fish populations within the river. Like most rivers in the UK, the chemical status changed from good to fail in 2019, due to the presence of polybrominated diphenyl ethers (PBDE), perfluorooctane sulphonate (PFOS) and mercury compounds, none of which had previously been included in the assessment.

== See also ==
- New Bedford River
- Bedford Level experiment
- Forty Foot Drain
