= Nene Washes =

Wetland in Cambridgeshire, England

Coordinates: 52.58°N 0.07°W

- Site of Special Scientific Interest
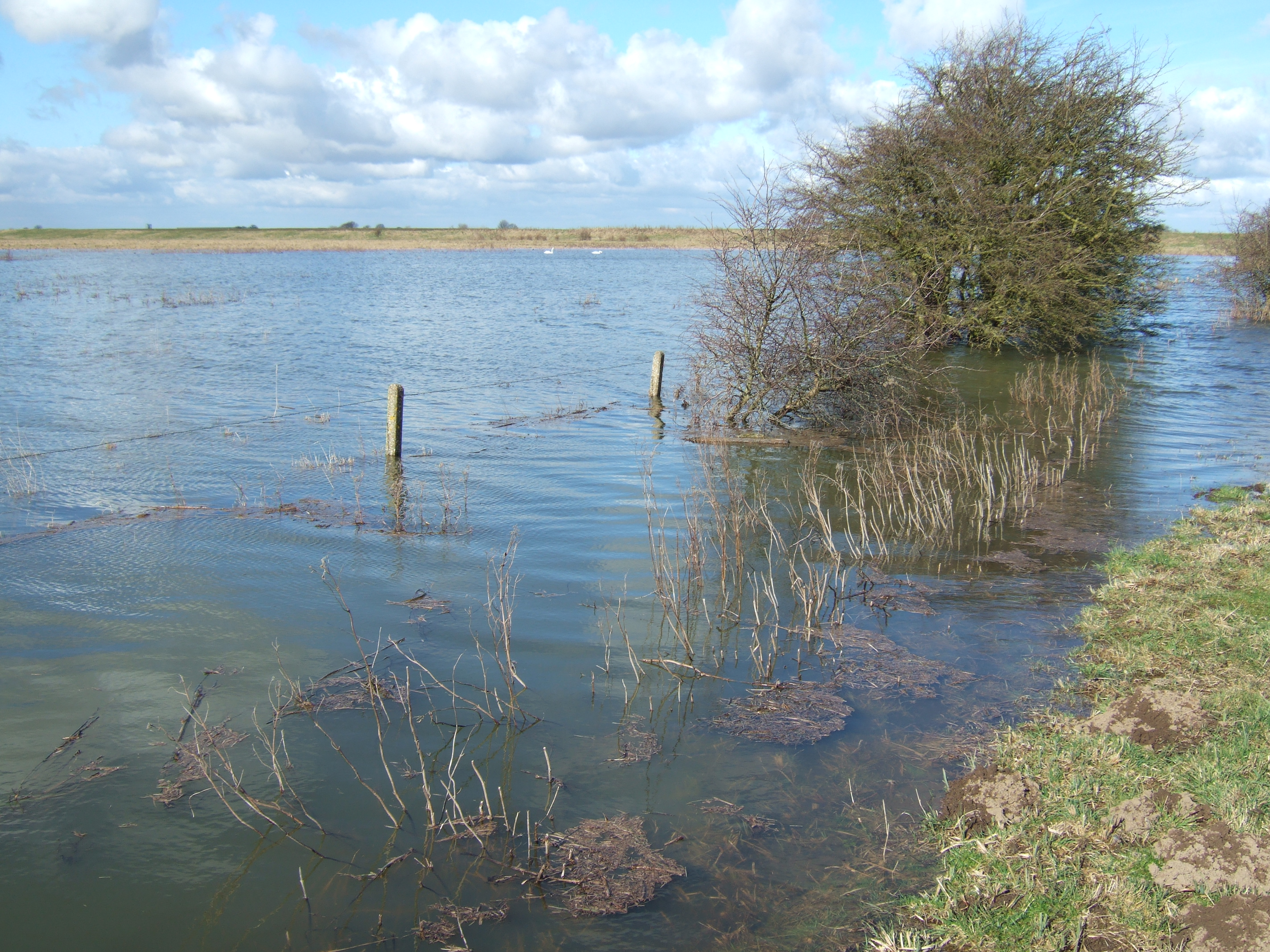
- Location of Nene Washes.
- Area of search: Cambridgeshire
- Grid reference: TL 307 999
- Interest: Biological
- Area: 1,522.1 hectares
- Notification date: 1983
- Location map: Magic Map

Designations

Ramsar Wetland
- Official name: Nene Washes
- Designated: 5 March 1993
- Reference no.: 587

Nene Washes is a 1,522-hectare (3,760-acre) biological Site of Special Scientific Interest on the bank of the River Nene east of Peterborough in Cambridgeshire, England. It is also a Ramsar internationally important wetland site, a Special Area of Conservation, a Special Protection Area and a Nature Conservation Review site. An area of 280 hectares (690 acres) is managed by the Royal Society for the Protection of Birds. The total area of the Ramsar site is 1,517 hectares (3,750 acres).

This is described by Natural England as one of Britain's few remaining areas of washland which are vital for the survival of wildfowl and waders. It is used as a flood storage reservoir for the River Nene and is flooded for most of the winter and is pasture in the summer. It is important for birds all year. In the wintering wildfowl include wigeons, teals, pintails and Bewick's swans. In the breeding season the nesting species include common crane, black-tailed godwit, garganey and common snipe. The cranes also winter in the area and flock in nearby fields. They reserve is also good for birds of prey including Western marsh harrier, Eurasian hobby and short-eared owl.

The rich flora in ditches include uncommon species such as frogbit, water violet and flowering rush. There is also an important population of spined loach in the drainage channels in and around the washes, and the presence of this species is one of the primary reasons for the site's designation as a Special Area of Conservation.

There is access to the RSPB reserve immediately east of the B1040 road from Nene Way. The western end is private land with no public access.
