= Larman Register =

British Fen skater

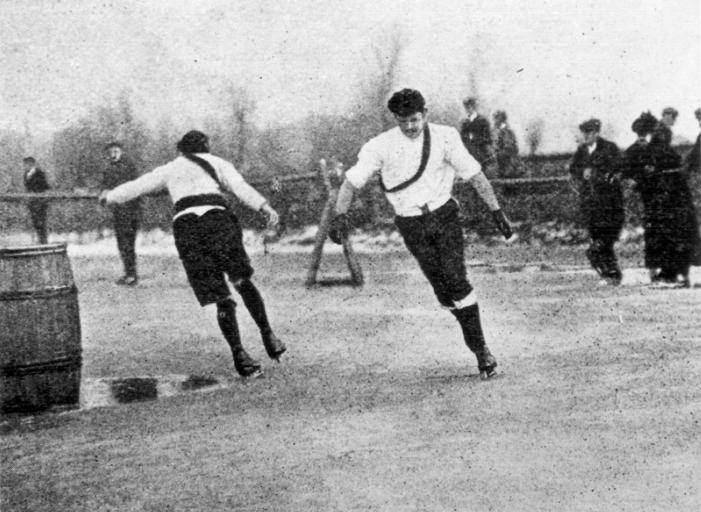
- Fen skating
- Born: 1829; Southery, Norfolk, England
- Died: 1897
- Known for: Fen skating

Larman Register (1829–1897), was fen skating champion in the early 1850s; his brother Robert (1820–1890) and nephews Larman, Robert, William and George were also skaters.

Brothers Larman and Robert Register announced in the Cambridge Chronicle in 1853 that they could be backed to skate any two skaters in England for £20. Three years later, Larman Register had teamed up with his vanquisher Turkey Smart to issue a similar challenge.

After a series of mild winters in the 1840s, skating was dominated for a few years by men from the Norfolk village of Southery, with Larman Register acknowledged as champion, beginning a run of wins that began in 1850. Register's reign as champion came to an end in December 1854 when he was dramatically beaten on Welney washes by Welney man Turkey Smart. After beating three Southery men, Butcher, Porter and Larman Register, Turkey Smart met David Green of March in the final. "Smart beat Green easily, and carried off the laurels, and is generally believed to be the best man of the day". The Cambridge Chronicle gives a long account of a match at Ely in February 1855 in which Turkey Smart beat Larman Register to win £7.

Several mild winters followed, and when skating resumed in January 1867, Larman Register had by now acquired some acreage and joined the ranks of race officials; his nephew and namesake was racing, although he never enjoyed quite the same success as his uncle.

In 1875, Larman Register raced a steam train from Littleport to Ely and beat it by 30 seconds, despite railwaymen attempting to sabotage him by tossing hot coals onto the ice.
