= Fen skating =

Traditional form of ice skating in England

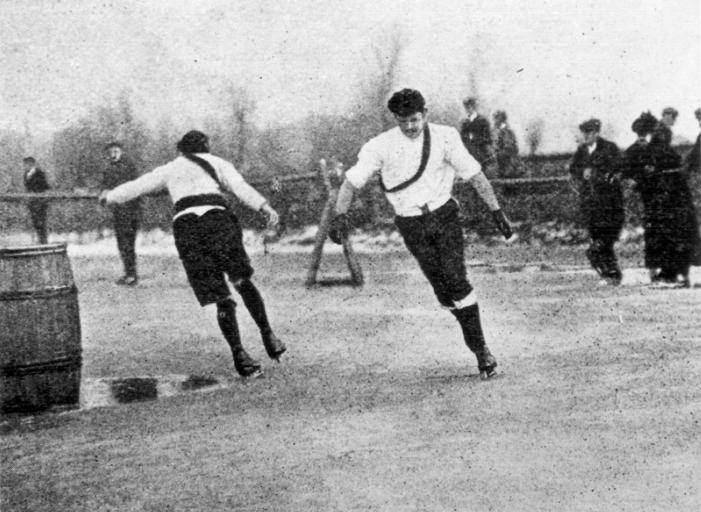
James Smart rounds the barrel turn

Fen skating is a traditional form of ice skating in the Fenland of England. The Fens of East Anglia, with their easily flooded meadows, form an ideal skating terrain. Bone skates have been found in the area dating back to the medieval period.

It is not known when the first skating matches were held, but by the early nineteenth century they had become a feature of cold winters in the Fens. The golden age of fen skating was the second half of the nineteenth century, when thousands of people turned out to watch such legendary skaters as Larman Register, William "Turkey" Smart, (William) "Gutta Percha" See, and brothers George 'Fish' Smart (1858–1909) and James Smart (1865–1928). Members of the Bury Fen Bandy Club published rules of the game in 1882, and introduced it into other countries. The National Skating Association was set up in Cambridge in 1879 and took the top few fen skaters to the Netherlands, where they had a brief moment of international glory with James Smart becoming Britain's only ever world champion speed skater. The twentieth century saw a decline in the popularity of fen skating.

== Early history ==
While it is not known when and how metal-bladed skates were introduced into Britain from the continent, where they had been in use since the 13th century or earlier, in the fens metal skates were in use by the seventeenth century; before this people had attached sharpened animal bones to their feet to travel on ice.

William Fitzstephen described skating on the Thames in the 12th century. Diarists Samuel Pepys and John Evelyn both recorded seeing skating on the canal in St. James's Park in London during the winter of 1662. Pepys wrote "...over to the Parke (where I first in my life, it being great frost, did see people sliding with their skeats which is a very pretty art)...". As a recreation, means of transport and spectator sport, skating in the Fens was popular with people from all walks of life. Racing was the preserve of workers, most of them agricultural labourers. It is not known when the first skating matches were held, but by the early nineteenth-century racing was well established and the results of matches were reported in the press.

In January 1763 on the river at Wisbech, Hare of Thorney raced against a Danish sailor, the first day for 20 guineas and the second for 50 Guineas, the Dane winning both races. Also in January John Lamb and George Fawn skated between Wisbech and Whittlesey, around 25 km (15 miles) for Ten Guineas a side. Lamb came home first in 46 minutes.

An early advocate of the use of skates that could be screwed to the heels of boots (rather than tied to the boot) was the accomplished figure skater 'Captain' Robert Jones in his 1772 book A Treatise on Skating. Skates based on his designs were soon in manufacture in London.

In February 1810 a newspaper reported "On Monday, se'nnight, a silver cup was skaited for upon the rivet at Wisbech, which drew, together a great concourse of people from all parts of the neighbourhood, it was supposed there were at least 3000 persons upon the ice. The cup was won by a man of the name of Johnson, of Wimblington."

On Christmas Eve 1819 the Stamford Mercury published the challenge to skate a two- or four-mile course for any sum between twenty and one hundred pounds by Mr John Staplee of Croyland Bank.

On 17 January 1820 Croyland (Crowland) a £5 prize and 2-mile heats saw 18-year-old Charles Staplee (Crowland Bank) beat Mr. Young (Nordolph). In the other heat, Mr. Gettam beat John Staplee (Crowland Bank) and Gettam beat Charles Staplee in the final. Girdham, the poor fenman who skated the mile seven seconds under the three minutes on Thursday 4 January 1821, below Ely, unfortunately lost his life that night on his way home, by skating with great velocity against the trunk of a willow tree, not far distant from his own house at Upwell, on the river Cam. In January 1821 Staplee the younger beat May of Wisbech in a two-mile challenge at Crowland Wash for five Guineas a side.

In 1823 a Wisbech coach is shown in the background of a Chatteris skating match illustration by George Cruikshank. The cold winters of the 1820s and 1830s saw a number of fenmen make a name for themselves as skaters. They included: John Gittam and John Young of Nordelph; the Drake brothers of Chatteris; Perkins and Cave of Sutton; James May of Upwell; waterman John Berry of Ramsey; the Egars of Thorney; the Staples of Crowland; and William Needham of March.

== Matches ==
When it froze, skating matches were held in towns and villages all over the Fens. In these local matches, men (or sometimes women or children) would compete for prizes of money, clothing, or food. "During severe winters it is no uncommon thing to see joints of meat hung outside the village pub, to be skated for on the morrow". The winners of local matches were invited to take part in the grand or championship matches in which skaters from across the Fens would compete for cash prizes in front of crowds of thousands.

The championship matches took the form of a Welsh main or "last man standing" contest. The competitors, 16 or sometimes 32, were paired off in heats and the winner of each heat went through to the next round. The farmers and gentry who organised the matches would raise a subscription for prize money. £10 was a typical purse in the mid-nineteenth century, with about half going to the winner and the rest divided amongst the other runners according to how far they had got in the contest. This was at a time when agricultural labourers typically earned about 11 shillings a week.

A course of 660 yards was measured out on the ice, and a barrel with a flag on it placed at either end. The course was divided down the middle with more barrels, sods of earth or piles of snow. The skaters were drawn in pairs, and started one either side of the barrel, skate down the course, round the barrel and back again, with each skater keeping to their own side of the ice. For a one-and-a-half-mile race, the skaters completed two rounds of the course, with three barrel turns. If there were 16 competitors the winner and runner-up would have skated a total of 6 miles.

There were also matches for women although they did not attract quite the same attention or prize money as the men's matches. The Cambridge Chronicle, after a long account of a match at Ely in February 1855 in which Turkey Smart beat Larman Register to win £7, told readers merely that "the white-bonneted Mepal girl won 10 shillings easily, and beat the Lynn girl – a good race". By the 1890s the women had at least acquired names; the Hunts County Guardian reported in February 1892 that Mrs. Winters of Welney had beaten 13-year-old Miss Dewsbury of Little Thetford in the final of a half-mile match at Littleport.

As well as competing in matches, the top skaters issued challenges via the press. James Egar, aged 24 who died on 8 May 1823, the second son of Mr. Egar, of Thorney Fen; was one of the three brothers whose proficiency in skating led them to give a challenge to all England. Brothers Larman and Robert Register announced in the Cambridge Chronicle in 1853 that they could be backed to skate any two skaters in England for £20. And three years later Larman Register had teamed up with his vanquisher Turkey Smart to issue a similar challenge.

Another challenge for the fastest men was the straight mile with a flying start. In 1821 a Newmarket man made a wager of 100 guineas that a skater could cover a mile in three minutes. John Gittam of Nordelph won him his wager at Prickwillow with 7 seconds to spare. A generation later Turkey Smart was backed to skate a mile in two-and-a-half minutes, but failed by 2 seconds.

== Fen skates ==
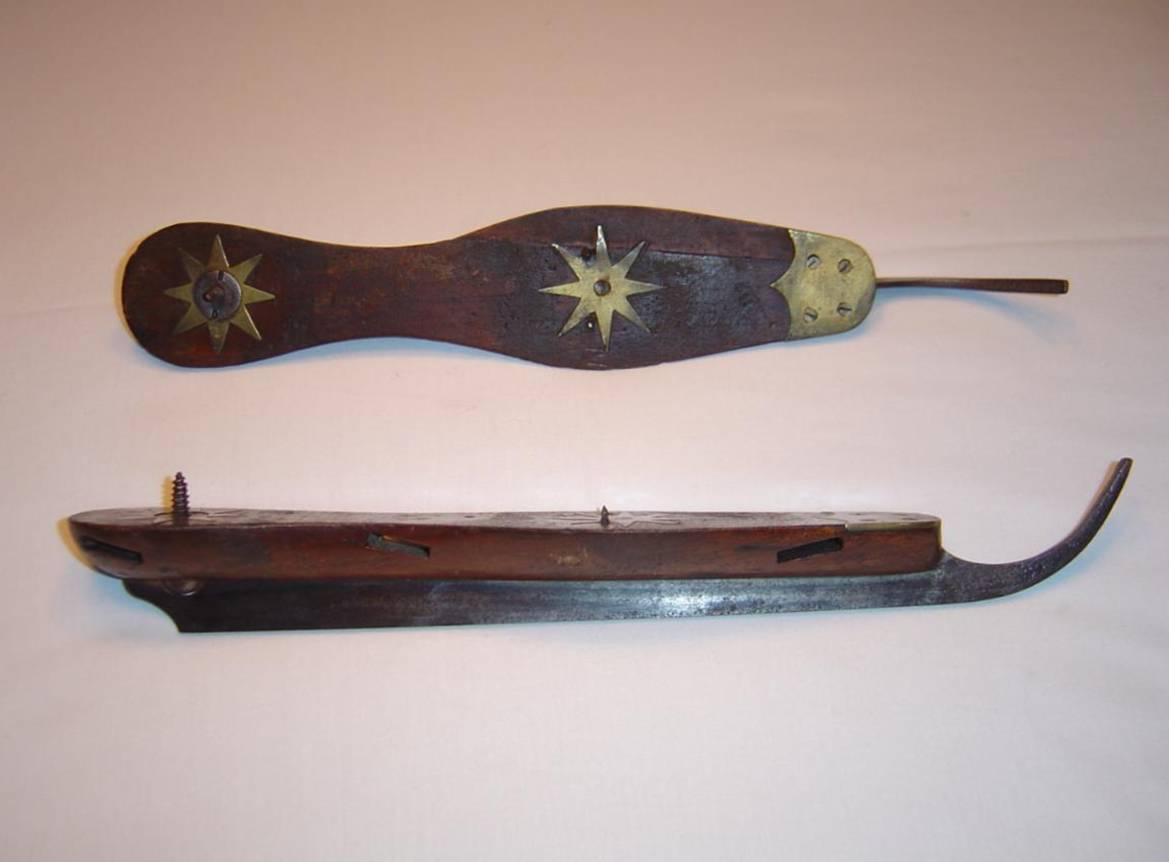
Fen runners

The oldest known Fen skates are thought to be from the 18th century. Some - a pair in the Museum of Cambridge, for example were made entirely of iron. In the Fens skates were called pattens, fen runners, or Whittlesey runners. The footstock was made of beechwood. A screw at the back was screwed into the heel of the boot, and three small spikes at the front kept the skate steady. There were holes in the footstock for leather straps to fasten it to the foot. The metal blades were slightly higher at the back than the front. In the 1890s fen skaters started to race in Norwegian-style skates. The Wisbech & Fenland Museum exhibits include a wide range of skates including early examples made from bone (found on Welney Marsh), pattens and Norwegian-style skates, as well as other fenland sports and past times. (https://www.wisbechmuseum.org.uk)

== 1800–1824 ==
In February 1814 a local newspaper reported 'On Wednesday se’nnight a purse of eight guineas was skaited for on Wisbech river, by eight of the principal runners in the neighbourhood, which was won by a young man from Thorney, named Hickling. The number of spectators it is supposed exceeded 3000.' John Peck in his diary records going to Wisbech on Boxing Day 1815 to see a skating match on the River Nene 'between S. Jealous and R. Reynolds; won easily by Jealous'. He reports other matches in February 1816 On 21 February 1816 a subscription purse (free prize) was given by the Gentlemen of Wisbech, to be skated for on the river near the town, which was won by Joseph Peck, of Parson Drove, beating H. Green, of March, and six others. The novelty of seeing two young ladies, Miss S. Ulyat and Miss Peck, from Parson Drove, skating on the slippery element, attracted a universal notice.

The Cambridge Chronicle reported on a match in 1820.

Skating.—The manly and graceful exercise skating has seldom been exhibited in greater perfection than Wisbech, on the 10th instant, when eight of the most celebrated runners in England, viz- Messrs. Purrant of Elm, Taylor of Leverington Parson Drove, Wooll and May of Upwell, Drake and Bassett of Chatteris, and Young and Gittam of Nordelph, met to contest the prize of superiority. The competitors in these "Games" run a Welsh Main, that, if there eight of them, it requires seven heats to decide the contest. The winners of the first four were Messrs. Drake, May, Young, and Gittam; of the two next Messrs. May and Young; aud of the last Mr. Young. To the admirers of the usual circular evolutions, it may seem ridiculous to attribute elegance to the mere runner, but without cause. Great apparent facility, and smoothness of movement, are indispensable to that pre-eminent celerity which alone can ensure success, and the "victorious racer" on this occasion, manifested a grace and elegance fully commensurate with his extraordinary strength and agility. The course, which is a mile out back again and to be run twice over, making 2 miles in the whole, had been measured out and prepared below the town; it was observed, that the former mile was, for the most part, performed in 3 minutes; the latter in 3 minutes and 10 seconds. The elevated mounds, which confine the river either side, gave all the advantages of an ancient theatre to the immense concourse of spectators from every part of the country; and, as the several competitors were men of the highest renown, a degree of interest and generous emulation was excited by this harmless sport, never exceeded by that of the ruinous race-course, or the sanguinary bull-fight.

On Monday 30th? 1822 eight of the principal runners (matched as follows) Young and Magnis, May and Cave, Bradford and Hicklin, and Berry and Drake, skated for a prize of ten guineas. Young, May, Bradford and Drake were the four winning men, and ran in the following order for the prize: May beat Young, Bradford beat Drake, May beat Bradford; the last race was so strongly contested that there was scarcely half a-yard difference between the men. On 31st another prize, of ten sovereigns, was skated for at Chatteris, which was won by Young, who beat Cave, Gittam, May and Bradford with apparent ease.

On 14 January 1823 a match for a prize of ten sovereigns took place on the Forty-foot river near Chatteris. First heats Varlo of Benwick beat Drake of Chatteris; Green of March beat Burgess of Whittlesea; Bradford of Farcott beat Middlewitch of Newmarket; Young of Nordelph beat Cave of Sutton; Gittam of Nordelph beat Angood of Chatteris; May of Upwell beat Berry of Ramsey; Richardson of Glassom beat Minett of Manea. Second Heats Green beat Varlo; Bradford beat Terrey; Young beat Gittam; May beat Richardson. Third heats Bradford beat Green; May beat Richardson. Final Young beat Bradford. Little betting took place although there were said to be more than 6,000 present.

On 24 January a grand skating match took place on Wisbech River, sixteen of the first rate skaters from various places in the neighbourhood, on Friday for 10 sovereigns. FIRST HEATS. Winners. Trower, Upwell beat Eat, of Parson Drove; Cox, of Upwell beat Wright, of Parson Drove; Bartis, of Wisbech beat Pogson, of Wisbech St. Mary; Torry, of Wisbech beat Taylor, of Parsondrove; Burgess, of Outwell beat Cook of Postland; Thomas Youngs, of Northdelph beat Green, of March; May, of Upwell Beat Drake, of Chatteris; John Youngs, of Northdelph beat Egar, of Thorney. SECOND HEATS Trower beat Cox; Torry beat Pogson; Thomas Youngs beat Burgess; John Youngs beat May. Third heats Trower beat Torry; John Youngs beat Thomas Youngs. THIRD HEATS Trower beat Torry; Thomas Youngs beat John Youngs. FINAL HEAT. Mr. John Youngs beat Trower. The prize was decided by fifteen most ably contested heats, over an excellent course of fine ice, in length about half a mile; twice round for a heat, making a distance of nearly two miles. The winner Thomas Youngs is allowed to be the fastest and most elegant skater in England. Much credit is due to the gentlemen who had the management of the sports — a band of music was provided, which played many excellent tunes in the intervals between the heats, to the great satisfaction of an immense concourse of spectators, who lined the banks of the river on each side; and as a number of men with ropes were engaged to prevent individuals skating on the course during the time of the races, every person had a distinct view of the competitors for same.

== 1825–1849 ==
In January 1826 a skating competition took place near Parson Drove, Isle of Ely for a prize of eight sovereigns with 16 first-rate skaters.

1. W.Harton, Thorne Fen beat Hickling, Crowland. 2. Grower beat Green, March. 3. German, Whittlesey beat Bavin, March. 4. De Pear, Crowland beat Taylor 5. Farrow, Nordelph beat Jackson, Crowland 6. Redhead, St. Edmunds beat Putrell, St. James'. 7. Plowright, Coates beat Smith, Nordelph. 8. J.Barton, Thorney Fen beat Fovarque, Crowland 9. W.Barton beat Trower 10. German beat De Pear 11. Redhead beat Farrow 12. J.Barton beat Plowright 13. German beat W.Barton 14. Redhead beat J.Barton 15. German beat Redhead in the final. An immense crowd of not less than 4,000 was entertained by a band from Wisbech. An excellent female skater was also an additional and rather novel attraction to the visitors.

On 14 February 1838, a match took place at March, when sixteen of the most celebrated skaters were selected. On account of the experience derived from the several matches which have taken place in the neighbourhood during the season, the conductors of the course were enabled to match their men with the greatest propriety. The following is the order of the racing. First Course. Ridlington of Cowbit beat Sharman of Holme. Tomlin of Doddington beat Clare of Wisbech. Tuck of Nordelph beat Scotney of Cowbit. Ramsey beat Mitcham of Benwick. Needham of March beat Barton of Guyhirn. Bullimore of Whittlesey beat Setchell of Wimblington. Allen of Pinchbeck beat Turner of Upwell. Ward of March beat Hawley of Holme. Second Course. Tomlin beat Ridlington. Needham beat Bullimore. Berry beat Tuck. Ward beat Allen. Third Course. Tomlinson beat Berry. Neednam beat Ward. Fourth Course. —Tomlin beat Needham. Great confidence was felt by the friends of Ridlington, but Needham again gallantly proved to them their error. During the season, Needham has run 21 matches, and won 18. Two of his conquerors he has since beaten, the third he has not had an opportunity of again trying, Tomlinson was declared to be the swiftest of any on the course: the progress he has made since the commencement of the season is most surprising.

In 1841 a match for £10 was held on Whittlesey Mere with 16 competitors. Richardson, Ramsey v German, Whittlesey. Needham, March v Bull, Chatteris. Tomblin, Doddington v Reeve, Upwell. W.Williams, Crowland v Brown, Chatteris. Sharman, Holme v Berry, Ramsey. Mitham, Benwick v Cole, Holme. Searle, Wimblington v Tebbutt, Pons Bridge. J.Williams, Crowland v Green, March. The winners of the next heats were Needham, Tomblin, Sherman and Searle. Tomblin best Needham Sharman beat Searle. Tomblin beat Sharman in the final.

A match took place on Wisbech Canal on 8 February 1841 for a prize of three sovereigns over a two-mile course. Bobbins beat Scrafield, Harwood beat Goodson, Gray beat Scott. Langham beat Key. Masson beat Lynn, Clare beat Etherington, Sutton beat Desborough, and Kimmons beat See. Harwood then beat Bobbins, Langham beat Gray, Clare beat Massour, and Sutton beat Kimmons. Harwood then beat Langhara and Clare having defeated Button, Harwood and Clare contended for the prize, which was won by Harwood. In the last heat, between Clare. of Wisbech, and Harwood, of Well, there was some good running, and Clare for the first mile was ahead the whole way, but Harwood was too tough in the wind for Clare, as he came in at the same speed with which he started, but for a mile course there is little doubt Clare being the fastest. The first mile was run in three minutes, and the ice was far from being good, on account of the quantity of water on the course and the heavy snow storm at the time of racing.

== 1850–1875 ==
After a series of mild winters in the 1840s, skating was dominated for a few years by men from the Norfolk village of Southery, with Larman Register acknowledged as champion. Register's reign as champion came to an end in December 1854 when he was dramatically beaten on Welney washes by Welney man Turkey Smart. The winter of 1854/55 was exceptionally cold and a month's frost from the end of January saw Turkey Smart triumphant in twelve matches, skating to easy victories at Outwell, Welney, Benwick, Mepal, March, Deeping, Ely, Peterborough and the 'Grand Skating Match' for a ten Guineas prize at Wisbech. There was one defeat, at Salter's Lode. His winnings came to a total of £54 15 shillings and a leg of mutton. The Cambridge Chronicle described how the match at Mepal, on a brilliantly fine day, had thinned the towns of Cambridge, Ely, St Ives, Chatteris and March of their population.

The clergy and 'squires', gentry and tradesmen – hale ploughboys and rosy milkmaids – ladies parties in carriages, gigs and carts, made their way to the bank near the bridge, and took their respective positions, where the view was excellent, and all that could be wished, for the 'St Ledger day on the ice'. A brass band of music from Chatteris was placed on the bridge, and played the most lively tunes: at the starting of a race, 'Cheer boys, cheer', and at the winning, 'See the conquering hero comes'. The number of persons present was stated at from five to eight thousand, and some said ten thousand. Punctually at the time appointed, half-past one, the racing commenced. The bold Fen-men soon appeared, whose iron frames, lion sinews, elasticity of action and body, astonished all beholders. They were a fine specimen of the bold peasantry of England.

After beating three Southery men, Butcher, Porter and Larman Register, Turkey Smart met David Green of March in the final. "Smart beat Green easily, and carried off the laurels, and is generally believed to be the best man of the day".

Turkey Smart remained the champion for the rest of the decade, his nearest rivals being his brother-in-law "Gutta Percha" See, the Registers, Butchers and Porters of Southery, David Green of March, and fellow Welney men Wiles and Watkinson. But by the winter of 1860/61 he was no longer invincible; "Gutta Percha" See shared the laurels with him that year.

Several mild winters followed and when skating resumed in January 1867 younger skaters were threatening the champions. Turkey Smart won the Kimbolton Stakes on the flooded Huntingdon Racecourse in front of a grandstand of local aristocracy, and followed it with a win at Denver, beating Robert Watkinson in the final, but these victories were followed by a first round loss at Welney. W See (Welney) beat T Porter (Southery) in the final. Larman Register had by now acquired some acreage and joined the ranks of race officials; his nephew and namesake was racing, although he never enjoyed quite the same success as his uncle.

The following year Stephen Smith, a farmer's son from Conington, Tom Cross of Ely and the Shelton brothers from Ramsey came to the fore. "Turkey" Smart and "Gutta Percha" See continued to race, but were usually beaten in the early rounds of matches. In 1870 a Welney skater John Wiles beat Porter from Southery for the Championship of England in front of a crowd of about 6,000.

The winter of 1874/75 saw Tom Watkinson of Welney acknowledged as champion.

In January 1875 a skating match was held at Crowland for a prize of £15 in the presence of thousands of spectators. Watkinson of Welney beat G.Dunham also of Welney in the final.<ref"Stamford Mercury" – via British Newspaper Archive.</ref>

There was then an interval of mild winters, before the next generation of Smarts and Sees emerged as top skaters.

== 1878–1900 ==
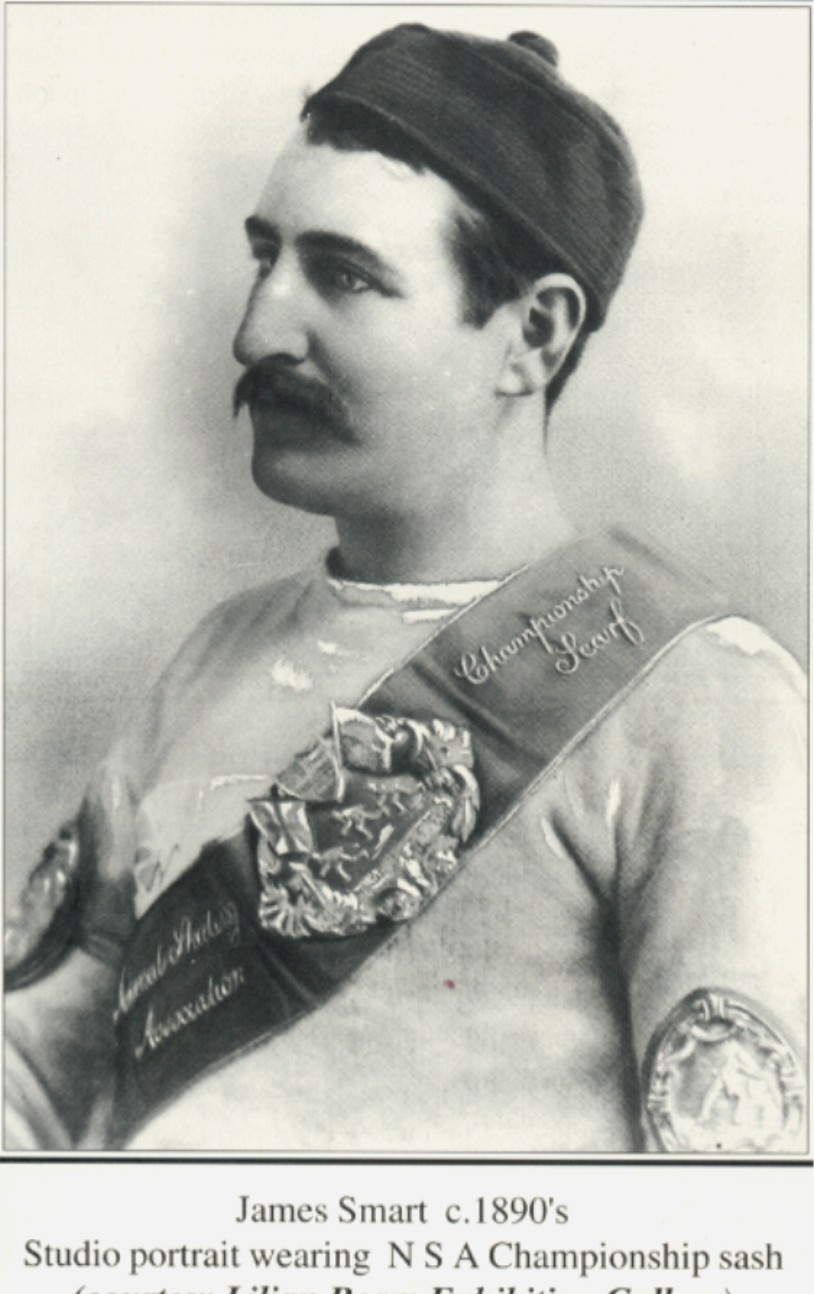
James Smart

The winter of 1878–79 was a cold one; during December and January, 21-year-old George "Fish" Smart, a nephew of "Gutta Percha" See and "Turkey" Smart's wife, notched up victories at Welney, Mepal, Ely, Bluntisham, Upwell, Wormegay, Huntingdon, Peterborough, Swavesey and Thorney. At Spalding there was a dead heat in the final between Fish Smart and Tom Watkinson and there was a defeat by Albert Dewsberry of Coveney in a final at Peterborough. At Littleport N.Brown of Isleham beat ‘Young Gutta Percha See’ of Welney in the final on 24 January 1879. The second championship meeting of the present season was held at Ely on 25 January won by Fish Smart, the ninth this year. On eleven starts he has won nine, one dead heat and one loss. Although speed skating was practised in other parts of the country, fenmen with their unique style, and combination of stamina and speed, were the acknowledged masters. Lancashire sent three of their top skaters, G. Willcocks and the Boydells, to the Swavesey match in January 1879. All three were defeated in the first two rounds, with veteran Turkey Smart beating G. Willcocks by 200 yards in the first round. Afterwards one of the Lancashire skaters said: "We are the best men in our parts, but we run. These fenmen flee".

On 1 February 1879, a number of the great and the good of Cambridgeshire and Huntingdonshire met in the Guildhall, Cambridge, to set up the National Skating Association, with the aim of controlling the sport of fen skating. The founding committee consisted of several landowners, a vicar, a fellow of Trinity College, a magistrate, two members of parliament, the mayor of Cambridge, the Lord Lieutenant of Cambridge, journalist James Drake Digby, the president of Cambridge University Skating Club, and Neville Goodman, a graduate of Peterhouse, Cambridge (and son of Potto Brown's milling partner, Joseph Goodman).

The next two winters, 1879–80 and 1880–81, were good skating winters. The newly formed National Skating Association held their first one-and-a-half-mile British professional championship at Thorney in December 1879. There was a field of 32, including former champions Turkey Smart and Tom Watkinson. Fish Smart won, beating Knocker Carter of Welney in the final. His reward was a badge, a sash and a cash prize, given as an annual salary in instalments to encourage the champion to "keep himself temperate". The National Skating Association had also established an amateur championship, which was held for the first time at Welsh Harp, London, in January 1880, and won by Frederick Norman, a farmer's son from Willingham. The professionals were labourers who skated for cash prizes; the amateurs were gentlemen who skated a little more slowly for trophies.

Fish Smart remained unbeatable in the Fens during the winters of 1879–80 and 1880–81. He suffered one defeat in Lancashire when he skated on Carr Mill Dam against Our Nel's Jack (John Hill) of Billinge, but he had his revenge in a return match at Welney. Fish Smart's nearest rivals during those two winters were his younger brother Jarman Smart, and Albert Dewsberry. In 1880–81, he successfully defended his title at Crowland, beating Dewsberry in the final.

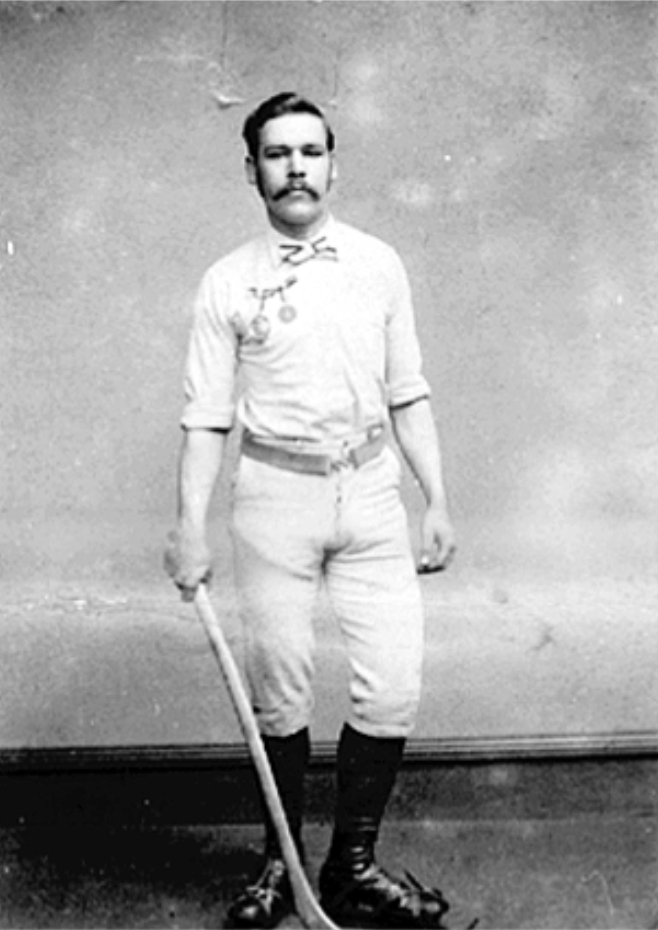
Charles Goodman Tebbutt with a bandy stick

Fish Smart won his third and final championship in January 1887 at Swavesey, beating his cousin Isaac See (the younger son of Gutta Percha See) in the final. In the intervening years there had been some short frosts, but the National Skating Association had not managed to arrange a meeting. They had taken Fish Smart to Holland for an international race in January 1885, but he was beaten in the first round by Benedict Kingma; two amateurs, Charles Goodman Tebbutt and S. Burlingham fared little better. A trip to Holland two years later was more successful. George See (Gutta Percha See's eldest son) and James Smart (Fish Smart's youngest brother) set up world records for the 3100 m and 1 mile in friendly matches, and Tebbutt won an amateur race. The following year, 1887, James Smart and George See returned to Holland, with Smart winning an international race over 2 miles at Amsterdam.

Championship Skating Match January 1877. About 2,000 persons yesterday attended the championship skating match at Grantchester, near Cambridge, when eighteen competed in a three-mile race, with six turns. The track was hard, but some large cracks made the course dangerous, and there were several falls. James Smart, ten miles champion, did the fastest course—namely, 9 min. 52 2-5 sec. He was beaten in the fourth round by Fish Smart, the champion, by half a yard; but in the final heat Fish Smart broke a skate, and Carter, of Welney, won first honours.

James Smart took the British professional title from his older brother Fish Smart at Lingay Fen in January 1889 and dominated fen skating for the next few years. He won the Dutch 1-mile championship in 1890–91 before successfully defending his British title. Two years later he did not compete in the British professional championship after falling out with the National Skating Association (George See won that year), but he regained his title in 1894–95. Several mild winters followed and when the championship was next held, at Littleport in February 1900, it was won by Fred Ward of Tydd Fen. (Note: One or other of the neighbouring villages Tydd Gote, Tydd St Giles and Tydd St Mary, on the Cambridgeshire-Lincolnshire border.) That year, for the first time, the amateur championship was won in a faster time than the professional championship.

In January 1891 for G 'Fish' Smart the N.S.A. arranged a flying start mile which he completed in 3 mins. A Grand Skating Match was held on 21 January 1891 on the River Nene at Wisbech, the two veterans ‘Turkey Smart (aged 61) and George ‘Gutta Percha’ See (aged 59) took part in a friendly match. The professional match saw James Smart best George See and Isaac See in a time trial. Three days later in the amateur match, James Aveling (March) defeated the amateur champion Wm Loveday of Welney, L. Aveling, S. M. Stanley, W. Racey and H. B. Stanley in the final heat.

PETERBOROUGH SKATING ASSOCIATION.—This association offered some valuable prizes for a professional mile race, on a course adjoining the River Nene, on Saturday, 26 December 1891. The ice was not in a very good condition, the thaw having commenced the previous night. The winners, with their times, were G. See, 3min 29 sec, 1st; I. See and Boon, 3min 37 sec, equal 2nd; J. Atkin, 3min 45 sec, 4th.

Geord See was defeated by P Ward of Tydd at a match at Peterborough on Thursday 5 January 1893. James Smart did not compete.

A skating match took place on Saturday afternoon, 7 January 1893 at Littleport between James Smart, champion, and George See. Smart made the second turn, See leading slightly the end of the first turn, but they were level at the last turn, and twenty yards from home Smart made a spurt, and won by twenty yards. Smart 5 min. 3.5 secs., Lee one second longer.

Littleport had become an important centre for skating in the last decade of the nineteenth century, when Thomas Peacock (owner of the Hope Brothers factory), leased a piece of ground by the railway line, embanked it, and flooded it to form a skating ground known as the Moors.

At Littleport 8 January 1894 over 1,000 people were present on the moor to witness the race for the Littleport Skating Club's £50 challenge cop. Fortytwo entries were received, amongst them being James Smart, of Welney (the holder), F. Smart, Jarman Smart, Henrik Lindahal (a Norwegian by birth, but now of Redditch), and several notable Lincolnshire skaters. The ice was in good condition, but a strong wind blew straight down the course, which was one mile and half. Punctually at one o’clock the first heat was run off, and for the final Lindahal made some good running with James Smart. Result:— Henrik Lindahal, Redditcb, 5 min. 20 1/5 sec., 1st; James Smart, Welney, 5 min. 22 1/5 sec., 2nd; and W. Housden, Upware, 5 min. 32 sec, 3rd.

On 9 February 1895 the second skating match for the unemployed was held on the Littleport Skating Ground, kindly lent by Mr. Peacock, in the presence of large number of spectators. The distance was about a mile with three turns, and the ice was in good condition. Mr. John Bell was starter, and Mr. E. M. Cheeseright, hon. sec. and treasurer. The course was kept in good order, and the races, which were got off without any loss of time, were run off in heats. In the old style. The prizes of tickets redeemable at the bakers, butchers, grocers and coal merchants of town. A number of boys races were held on an adjoining course, under the direction of Mr. W. H. Rains. The winners were rewarded with one shilling, and losers with sixpence, the gift of Mr. Thomas Peacock.

A photo from January 1893 of Charles J. Tebbutt exhibited and at Palace House appeared in the Spectator on 15 December 2018.(https://www.spectator.co.uk/2018/12/a-short-history-of-ice-skating/)

Lincolnshire skaters, unhappy that the National Skating Association was holding so many matches in the southern Fens, or outside the Fens, formed their own association in 1890 and held amateur championships at Vernatt's Drain and Cowbit Wash.

== 20th century ==
During a fen-skating exhibition at Bluntisham School in 1891, a voice was raised against the National Skating Association, accusing them of concentrating on international racing and destroying local racing. The National Skating Association also received criticism in the press: one article said that for various reasons the National Skating Association "has not commanded the confidence of the skating world" and that its offshoot, the Metropolitan branch "has practically swallowed it up". In 1894 the National Skating Association decided to move their headquarters to London, from where they concentrated on figure skaters and rinkmen.

In 1902 the professional championship was for the first time won by an uplander, Wigan lamplighter Joseph Bates who skated with a heart condition. The days when fenland agricultural labourers were masters of the sport were numbered, although the last three professional titles before World War I were won by fenmen; Fred Ward of Tydd Fen regaining his title at Lingay Fen in February 1905, and Sidney Greenhall of Landbeach winning in January 1908 and February 1912 at Lingay.

There were no official matches during World War I. Turkey Smart died in 1919, he lost five of his grandsons to the conflict, thus removing a generation of future fen skaters. Isaac See and George Smart are amongst those listed on the Welney War memorial.

A series of mild winters followed, giving an interval of 15 years with no championships. Fen skating during the late 1920s and early 1930s was dominated by amateur Cyril Horn of Upwell; the professional title was won by Don Pearson of Mepal. Fred Slater (Wisbech) won a professional mile race in 1940 on Cowbit Wash, Spalding in 3 min. 22sec, F.Smith (Whittlesey)second and Tom Ward (Wisbech) third. In 1940, L. B. Carter (Over) retained the Morley Cup for amateurs at Lingay Fen, near Cambridge in a mile race with a time of 3 min.14.2 sec, R. G. Saint (Somersham)second, A. H. V. Bloom (Oakington) third. N.V.Young of Wisbech won the Morley Cup on Bury Fen, near Earth in 1947. In 1947, the professional title made a brief return to Welney when R. W. Scott was victorious.

The second half of the twentieth century saw rinkmen winning most of the championships, which were last held in 1996/97. In recent years fen skaters David Buttress of Mepal, and Malcolm Robinson and David Smith of Sutton have competed in events in the Netherlands and Austria.

== 21st century ==
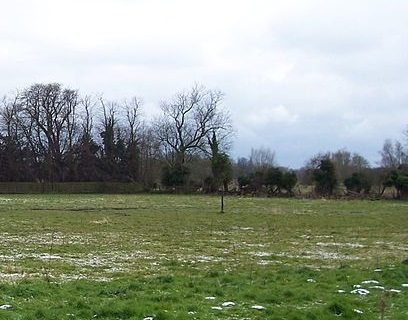
A lamp-post in a field is all that remains of the skating ground in Grantchester Meadows

In January 2010 fen skating championships took place at Earith and on Whittlesey Wash within the Nene Washlands Drainage Commissioners Area.

In 2014 plans were announced to build a long track speed-skating stadium in Littleport.

== Recreational skating ==
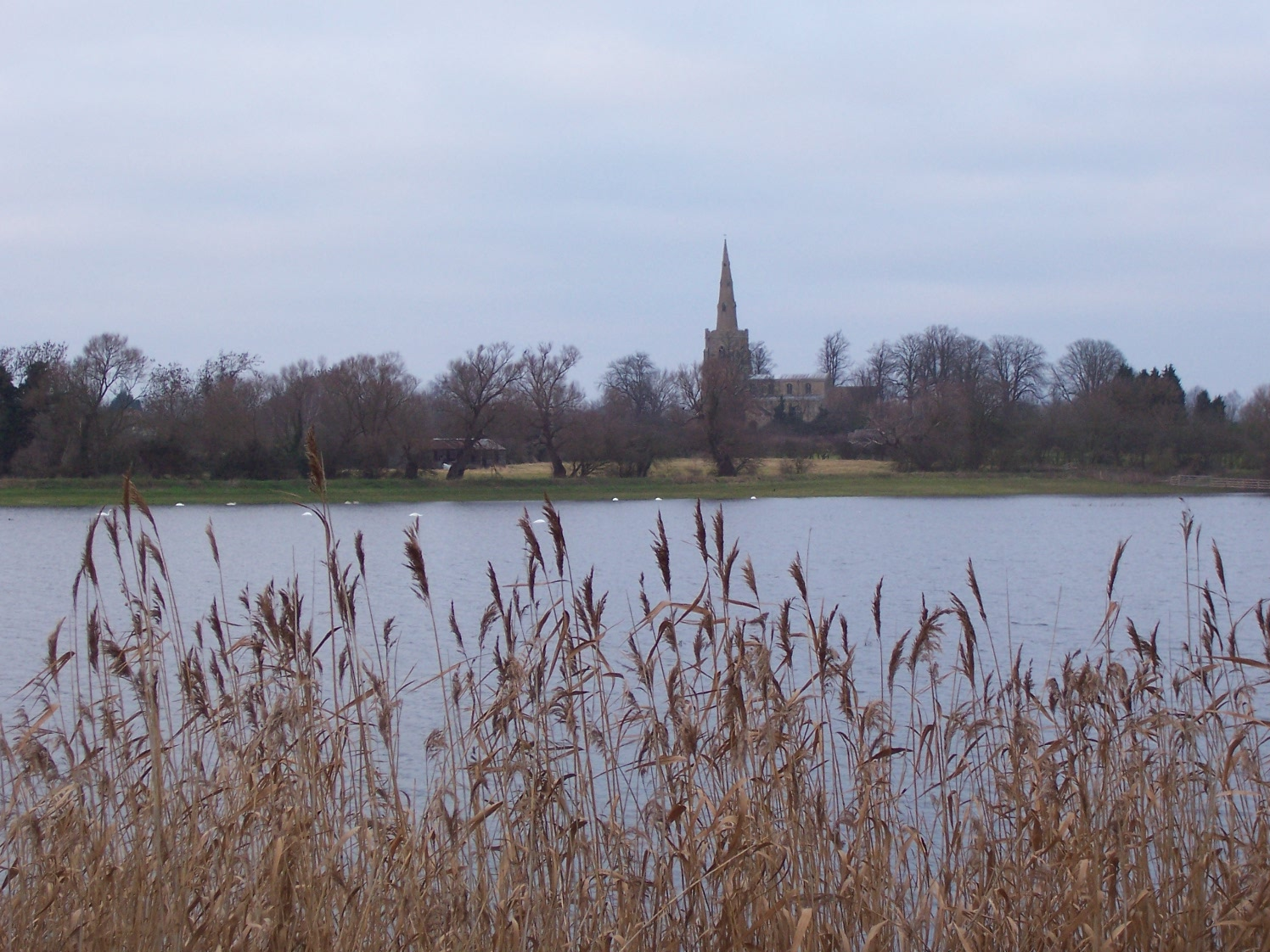
Bury Fen

Skating in all its forms was popular in the Fens. When it froze, Corporations and landowners would flood their meadows to turn them into skating grounds. In Cambridge, the Corporation pumped water onto Stirbitch Common and there was also a skating ground at Grantchester Meadows. Lamp-posts can still be seen in the middle of fields by the river at Grantchester Meadows where the old skating ground used to be. The cold weather of 2018 brought skaters out in numbers at Whittlesey.

Skating remains locally popular in Upware, in a flood-meadow on the east side of the River Cam at 52°18′14″N 0°15′8″E, when winter weather conditions permit.

== Bandy ==
The sport of bandy dates back to the early 1800s. Bury Fen, near Bluntisham in Cambridgeshire, England, was the home of the Bury Fen Bandy Club. Under the captaincy of Charles Goodman Tebbutt and his brothers, grandsons of Potto Brown's milling partner Joseph Goodman, the Bury Fen Bandy Club was responsible for formulating most of the rules of modern bandy and introducing the game into the Netherlands and other Northern European countries as well as other parts of Britain.

Inevitably Fenskating and international matches could clash with Bandy.

BURY BANDY CLUB v. St. IVES. Played on 24th December, on Bury Fen. Neither side was represented by its best team, St.Ives being without Wadworth, J. Goodman (competing in the half-mile race, at Lingay Fen), A. Burton, Percy Brown, Badcock, and Arthur Musson, and Bury Fen without S., A., and C. G. Tebbutt (in Norway with James Smart), T. Murphy, H. Murphy, and J. Key. The game was stoutly contested all through, and resulted in a win for Bury Fen by six goals to one. The goals were got by C. Searle, F. Jewson, O. C. Parron, and L. Tebbutt (3)The St. Ives goal was got by M. Warren. Many of the St. Ives players had not done much skating, and were therefore soon tired out when playing against a team of such strong skaters as their opponents.— St. Ives: W. Musson (goal), Ulph, H. Coots (backs), Musson, jun., Fowell (half backs), M. Warren, C. Kiddie (left)„ G. Goodman (centre), C. G. Goodman (captain), B. Coots (right). Bury Fen J. Watts (goal), N. Tebbutt. Gentle, J. Searle, A. Goodfry (backs), L. Tebbutt (captain, half beat), F. Jewson, O. Parren, C. Searle, Rawlins, D. Goode (forwards).

The National Bandy Association was founded in 1891. England was victorious at the so far only European Championships, held in 1913. Bandy was not resumed in England after World War I.

In the 21st century a new national federation was founded. It was first called Bandy Federation of England, and in 2010 England entered the Federation of International Bandy. After having been largely dormant, in January 2017 new people entered the board, the name was modified to England Bandy Federation and plans were made for activity on the ice, initially in the form of rink bandy. In Littleport in 2018 there was a project in place aiming to build an indoor stadium for ice sports, the Littleport Ice Stadium. If successful it will have the largest sheet of ice in the country with both a bandy pitch and a speed skating oval. In September 2017, the federation was renamed Great Britain Bandy Association.

Following the formation of a Bandy Club in Peterborough, three players represented Great Britain in the Bandy World Championships held in Sweden in 2019.

== Ice cricket ==
Ice cricket was also played in the Fens, though it never became as popular as bandy. In February 1855 the Cambridge Chronicle reported on a match between March and Wisbech on the Ballast Pits at March. The home team beat the visitors by 118 runs, thanks to a century not out by Rhodes. "The fielding and batting of many of the players was considered to be far superior to and more graceful than any cricketing on the green sward".

== Fen skaters ==
=== Norfolk skaters ===
The Norfolk village of Southery, on the River Great Ouse a few miles upstream from Denver Sluice, was home to a number of skating families. Larman Register (1829–1897), was champion in the early 1850s; his brother Robert (1820–1890) and nephews Larman, Robert, William and George were also skaters. A story is told of how a group of Southery skaters challenged some railwaymen to a race from Littleport to Queen Adelaide where the river runs alongside the railway. The skaters beat the train. Larman Register is said to have led the skaters; since the race took place in 1870 it was probably the young Larman, rather than his more famous uncle. The Porter family also produced a number of top skaters – including Job, Brewer, Tom, Holland and Charles – and skaters' wives (both Larman Registers married Porters). Chafer Legge, skater and bare-fist fighter, was employed by Newnham College, Cambridge, to tutor their students in skating during the long freeze of 1895. Chafer Legge's sons and daughter were also skaters, Noah being the most successful. Other skaters from Southery were the Butchers, and butcher Jesse Brown.

=== Welney skaters ===
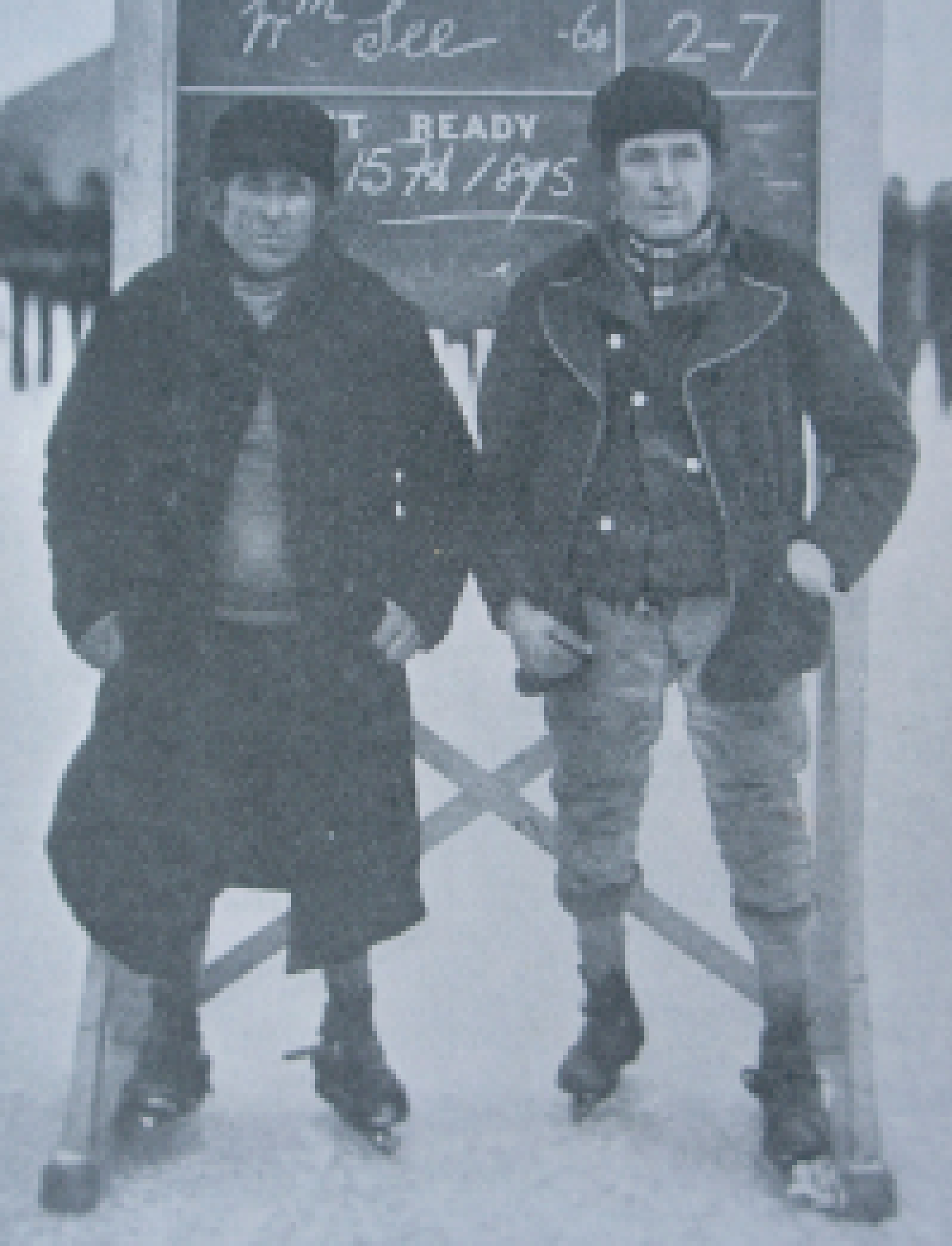
Gutta Percha See and Turkey Smart (right) in 1895.

Welney, a small village on the banks of the Old Bedford River, in the heart of the Fens on the Cambridgeshire-Norfolk border and three miles from the nearest railway station, produced so many top skaters that it became known as the "metropolis of speed skating". Members of the Smart and See families dominated British skating for two generations.

Turkey Smart (1830–1919) was champion in the 1850s. Gutta Percha See (1832–1898) usually ran second to his brother-in-law Turkey Smart, although he had a better season in 1861. Both Turkey Smart and Gutta Percha See continued to race long past their prime, and were still taking to the ice for exhibition races in their sixties. Of Turkey Smart's six sons only one – James – became a skater. Gutta Percha's sons George and Isaac both became top skaters.

Fish Smart (1856–1909) was champion for a decade from 1878. He gained his name from his swimming prowess. His father, Charles Smart, had been a fast skater but had never mastered the art of slowing down for the barrel turn so had never featured in racing. Fish Smart's younger brothers Jarman Smart and James Smart were also top skaters. Over a ten-year period Fish Smart was virtually unbeatable. He was a popular sportsman; a poem was composed in his honour and a racehorse was named after him. Fish Smart left Welney to work on construction sites around England and had a spell in Egypt working on the unfinished Sudanese railway, but returned to skate in the Fens when it froze. In January 1889 he relinquished his title to his younger brother James. Fish Smart was killed in an accident at work on Hull dockyard railway in 1909.

James Smart (1865–1928) was the youngest brother of Fish and Jarman Smart. Unlike his brother Fish and uncle Turkey he always skated under his real name; attempts to call him Eagle to distinguish him from his cousin James Turkey Smart did not stick. He won the professional title of Great Britain in 1890, 1895 and 1900 and the Littleport Cup in 1892. He also won a world championship and a Dutch championship. He was sponsored allowing him to train. Having spent some time training in Norway, he set up an agency to sell Norwegian skates in Britain.

George See (1862–1946) usually skated second to his cousins Fish Smart and James Smart, but took the British professional title in December 1892 when James Smart refused to defend his title. George's younger brother Isaac See was four times placed in the professional championship but never won.

Other top skaters from Welney included: George, Robert and Tom Watkinson, John Hills, John Wiles, Robert Naylor, Knocker Carter, bricklayer Harry Kent, and the Hawes brothers, brickmakers Alfred, William and James. Jane Winters, one of the fastest women skaters, came from Upwell but lived in Welney after marrying a Welney man. The Loveday brothers were top amateur skaters.

=== Isle of Ely skaters ===
Albert Dewsberry, the second fastest skater of his generation and the only fenman to beat Fish Smart in his prime, grew up in Coveney on the Isle of Ely. In 1881 he was runner-up in the British professional championship. The next year he had his left leg amputated below the knee following an accident. He continued to skate and entered the 3-mile championship in 1887 with a cork leg, being beaten in the first round. "The old Fen flyer, however, went very respectably, and was rewarded with a collection."

=== Cambridgeshire skaters ===
Cambridgeshire villages on the southern edge of the Fens produced a number of top skaters.

Isleham, on the River Lark, was home to the Wells and Brown skating families. Nathan Brown and Tommy Wells were the most successful of a number of brothers.

Nearby Soham Fen produced J Collins and Frederic Fletcher, who nearly drowned in a second round race against Turkey Smart on Welney Washes in January 1870.

Walter Housden from Wicken won the amateur championship in 1891 at the age of 19. He then turned professional and was the first winner of the Hayes-Fisher Cup. He was placed five times in the professional championship but never won.

Sidney Greenhall from Landbeach won the professional championship in 1908 and 1912, and the Littleport Cup in 1909. His brother, wheelwright William, and sister Nellie were also skaters.

== Fen skating in literature, art and music ==
Tom's Midnight Garden by Philippa Pearce, which is set just outside Cambridge (called Castleford in the book), features scenes of skating; Tom and Hatty skate to Ely on Fen runners along the frozen rivers during the great frost of 1895. "The Duddleston Cup", a poem by C. Woode was written the same year. John Gordon features Fen skating in several of his novels.

A skating match in 1823 is shown in an illustration by George Cruikshank. Charles Whymper (1853–1941), husband of one of Potto Brown's granddaughters, was well known for his skating scenes and portraits of skaters. John Moyer Heathcote also drew skating scenes.

A feature on Fen skating appears in The Pall Mall Gazette by a Fenman in 1901.

Duncan Stafford's "Fen-Skating Suite" (for string quartet) was shortlisted for the Cornelius Cardew Composition Prize in 1990. 'Skating Blades' on the CD Fen Folk by the folk group Hobson's Voice celebrates Fen skating.
