= Effects of climate change on ice skating =

Impact of climate change on ice skating

Climate change has affected outdoor ice skating around the world by reducing natural ice formation and shortening skating seasons. Warmer winters have led to fewer skateable days in North America, Europe and Asia. Traditional skating events, such as the Dutch Elfstedentocht and English fen skating, are at risk of disappearing. Health and safety risks, including "wild skating" on thin ice, are increasing. Communities have developed adaptation strategies such as experimental rinks that need only two cold days to form ice.

== Regional impact ==
=== North America ===
In Montreal, researchers used daily reports from about 247 outdoor rinks over four skating seasons to predict future trends. They found that the outdoor skating season could decline by 15 to 75 percent by 2090. Under a high emissions scenario the city might get only 11 skateable days per year, and some years could even have zero skating days as early as 2070. The study found that the average maximum temperature over the previous six days is the best way to predict when ice rinks will be open. It is more accurate than single-day temperatures. A 2025 study by Huazia Yao and Steven R. Fassnacht had used an energy-balance model to examine outdoor ice rink conditions at two location in Ontario, Canada over four decades. The researchers had found that there was no clear long-term trend in the modeled length of skating seasons at either location. However, they forewarned that limited observational data made the findings preliminary and emphasized that precipitation and wind conditions also influence outdoor ice information.

Across North America, the area where January temperatures stay cold enough for skating (around -5 °C) is shifting north. Researchers using climate models found that by 2050, much of eastern North America will be too warm for regular outdoor rinks. Under high-emissions scenarios, even parts of the Canadian prairies could become unsuitable by the 2080s. As the authors explain, many North Americans who build backyard rinks will eventually live in places where winters are only occasionally cold enough for skating. The Rideau Canal Skateway in Ottawa, called the world's largest skating rink, did not open at all in 2023 for the first time in its history. The canal normally requires 30 cm of solid ice to support maintenance vehicles, however mild temperatures and rain prevented safe ice formation that year.

=== Europe and Asia ===
In Europe, the Dutch Elfstedentocht is a 200 kilometer skating marathon through eleven cities that holds major cultural importance. The event has been held only 15 times since 1909, and the last one was in 1997. Researchers calculated that the chance of having cold enough winters to hold this event dropped from approximately 20% in 1901 to only 3-7% in 2023. As two Dutch newspapers, De Telegraaf and AD wrote, "with continuing global warming Elfstendentocht chances will strongly diminish." Under high emission scenarios, it will be impossible by 2100, but if global warming is kept within 1.5-2.0 °C, the marathon may still be possible.

In England, Fen skating a traditional form of ice skating in Fenland, has been practiced for centuries on flooded meadows. This sport requires specific freezing conditions (either four nights below -4 °C, three nights below -5 °C or two nights blow -8 °C. Studies using UK climate projections show a rapid decrease in such "skating freezes" between 1981 and 2079. By mid-century these events will become rare and will occur only in localized areas.

Asia also faces similar challenges. Beijing's Bei Hai Park has over 1,000 years of skating history, dating back to the Song Dynasty (960 - 1279). Historical records show that during the Qing dynasty, skating was considered a "national custom" and emperors would lead officials to inspect skating performarces. However, researchers analyzed data from 1989 to 2015 and found that for every 1 °C temperature increase in December, the skating seasons opens 3.8 days later and becomes 4.5 days shorter. The skating area has decreased by two-thirds since the 1990s, from multiple skating regions to one small lake.

== Cultural losses ==
Fen skating in England, the Elfsredentocht in the Netherlands and Chinese imperial skating traditions are all part of cultural heritage that are threatened. Researcher Jenny Richards notes, "Cultural practices typically require a continuity of performance for knowledge to be passed on." Since the last Elfstedentocht in 1997, people have found new ways to preserve these traditions. There is now an Elfstedentocht museum in Hindeloopen (one of the eleven cities along the marathon route), and in 2023-2024 a musical about the event was performed in a theater built specially with a 2,000 m^{2} ice floor. New York Times journalist, Moser, quoted in the study observed "We don't always think about the immaterial losses that warming will bring or, in the case of the Elfstendentocht, that is already has."

There is also concern that local knowledge will be lost when skating does not happen regularly. In rural England, skaters used to meet at a certain leaning telegraph pole but such knowledge passed on by word-of-moth fades when the ice stops forming. As Richards writes, 'Without regular natural skating freezes, knowledge of prime skating locations could be lost."

== Health and safety issues ==
Climate change introduces new health and safety risks for skaters. Warmer winters have led to more "wild skating" on thin and unsafe ice. In Beijing, some skaters eager to find skating opportunities use ice only 6-7 centimeters thick, even though the official safety standard is 15 centimeters. One skater interviewed said, "We usually go wild skating.. A thickness of 6-7cm is good enough." In five years, eight people fell through the ice wile doing this.

German coaches surveyed outdoor sports identified six climate related health risks: heat-related problems (dehydration, heatstroke), accidents and injuries from unstable weather, UV exposure (skin cancer risk), respiratory isses (ozone, pollen), infections (ticks, water-born diseases) and mental health concerns (frustration, trauma after accidents). One coach noted that after a tornado in 2021, "several sailors were on the water and several rowers were injured." Another coach observed that "older people have greater problems in the heat" and that dehydration had led to ambulance calls on golf courses.

== Adaptation strategies ==
In the Dutch village of Winterswijk, an experimental 400 meter rink was built on an asphalt base where ice is built up by spraying thin layers of water using an electrically driven vehicle. Marathon races can be held after just two cold days in a row (with overnight temperatures around -4 °C and clear skies). For competitions with fewer skaters, even one frost day is suffices. As an experiment, one person skated on ice only 1.5 millimeteres thick so the BBC could record the sound of skates on ice for a radio program about climate adaptation.

Beijing skaters travel to northestern China (Harbin and Qiqhaer), where winters are still reliably cold to get longer skating seasons. One skater tells that many people leave Beijing in late October to early November to go to the northeast for skating. Others switch to indoor rinks, synthetic ice or alternative sports like inline skating. A blade-grinding business operator with a 75-year family history said, "Even if only one person skated, I would persist doing this business...This is inheritance."

The National Hockey League developed its NHL Green initiative focusing on sustainability and the future of outdoor skating. The League recognizes that ponds and backyard rinks "have been the entry point for the sport for generations of children."
