= James Smart (skater) =

British Fen skater

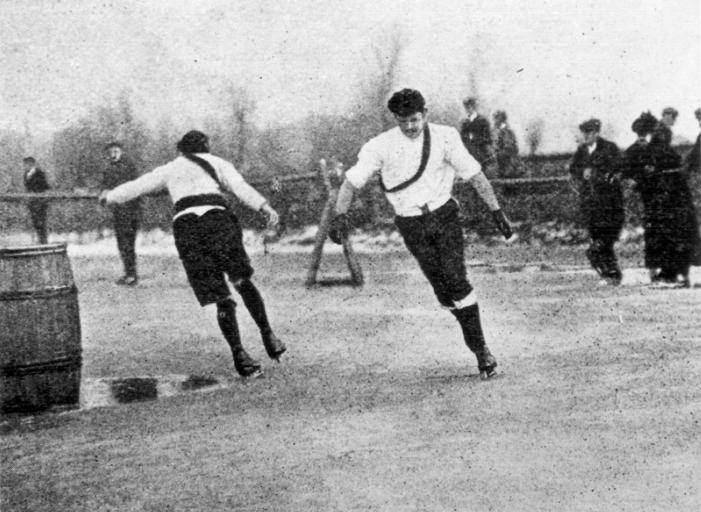
- James Smart rounds the barrel turn
- Born: 1865; Welney, Norfolk, England
- Died: 1928 (aged 62–63)
- Known for: Fen Skating
- Relatives: Turkey Smart (Uncle), George Smart (Brother)

James Smart (1865–1928) was the youngest brother of George 'Fish' Smart and Jarman Smart. Unlike his brother Fish and uncle Turkey, he always skated under his real name; attempts to call him 'Eagle' to distinguish him from his cousin James Turkey Smart did not stick. He won the professional title of Great Britain in 1890, 1895 and 1900 and the Littleport Cup in 1892. He also won a world championship and a Dutch championship. He was sponsored allowing him to train. Having spent some time training in Norway, he set up an agency to sell Norwegian skates in Britain.

== Life and career ==
During the Championship Skating Match in January 1887, about 2,000 persons attended the championship skating match at Grantchester, near Cambridge, when eighteen competed in a three-mile race, with six turns. The track was hard, but some large cracks made the course dangerous, and there were several falls. Smart, ten miles champion, did the fastest course—namely, 9 min. 52 2-5 sec. He was beaten in the fourth round by Fish Smart, the champion, by half a yard; but in the final heat Fish Smart broke a skate, and Carter, of Welney, won first honours.

Smart took the British professional title from his older brother George at Lingay Fen in January 1889. and dominated fen skating for the next few years. In January 1891 the NSA arranged a flying start mile for him, which he completed in 3 mins.
