= Lattersey Field =

Nature reserve in Cambridgeshire, England

Coordinates: 52.552°N 0.111°W

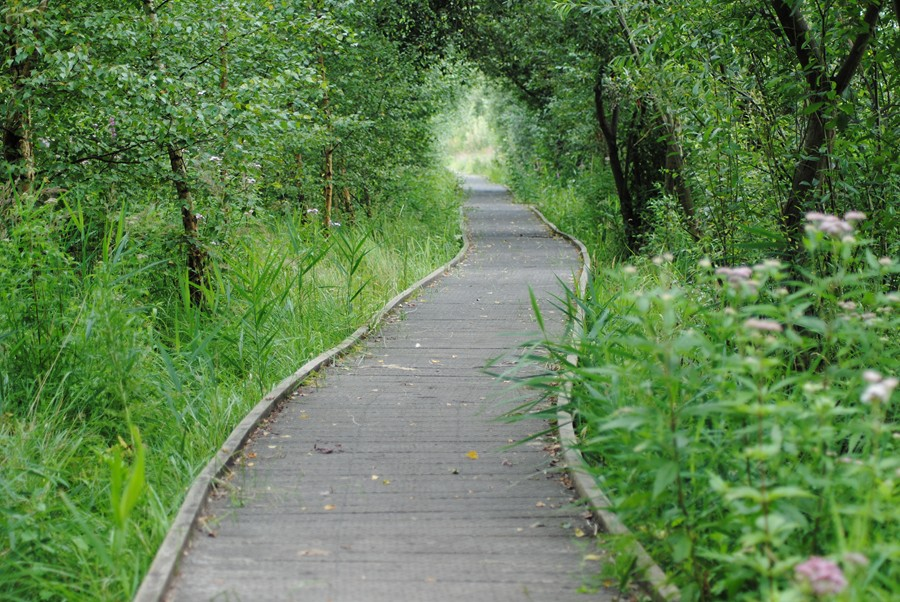
- Interactive map of Lattersey Field
- Type: Local Nature Reserve
- Location: Whittlesey, Cambridgeshire
- OS grid: TL 282 966
- Area: 11.9 hectares (29 acres)
- Manager: Wildlife Trust for Bedfordshire, Cambridgeshire and Northamptonshire

Lattersey Field is an 11.9 hectare Local Nature Reserve in Whittlesey in Cambridgeshire. It is owned by Fenland District Council and managed by the Wildlife Trust for Bedfordshire, Cambridgeshire and Northamptonshire.

This former clay brick quarry has pits which have filled with water, and it has diverse habitats of grassland, woodland, scrub, pools, marshes and reedbeds. Mammals includes water voles, water shrews, and there are birds such as sedge warblers, tawny owls, woodcocks, great spotted woodpeckers and reed buntings.

There is access from New Road, which bisects the site.
