= George Smart (skater) =

British Fen skater

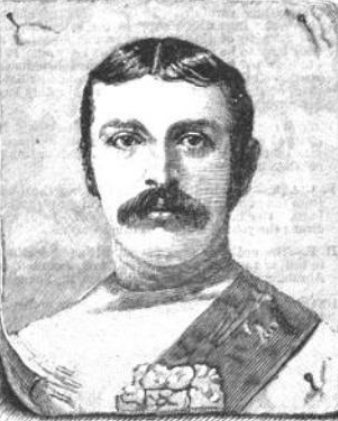
- George Smart, Drawn in Boys Own Annual, 1882
- Born: Welney, Norfolk, England
- Died: 1909; Hull Docks
- Other names: "Fish"
- Years active: 1878-1897
- Known for: Fen Skating
- Children: 5
- Relatives: Turkey Smart (Uncle), James Smart (Brother)

George "Fish" Smart (died 1909) was a fen skating champion for a decade from 1878. He gained his name from his swimming prowess. His father, Charles Smart, cousin of Fen Skater Turkey Smart, had been a fast skater but had never mastered the art of slowing down for the barrel turn so had never featured in racing. Fish Smart's younger brothers Jarman Smart and James Smart were also top skaters. Over a ten-year period, Fish Smart was virtually unbeatable. He was a popular sportsman; a poem was composed in his honour and a racehorse was named after him. He was primarily active in the era now known as the "Golden Age of Fen Skating".

== 1878–1881 ==
The winter of 1878–79 was a cold winter; the third coldest on record; during December and January, 21-year-old George "Fish" Smart, a nephew of "Gutta Percha" See and "Turkey" Smart's wife, notched up victories at Welney, Mepal, Ely, Bluntisham, Upwell, Wormegay, Huntingdon, Peterborough, Swavesey and Thorney. At Spalding there was a dead heat in the final between Fish Smart and Tom Watkinson. The second championship meeting of the present season was held at Ely on 25 January and was won by Fish Smart, the ninth that year. On eleven starts: he won nine, one dead heat and one loss.

The next two winters, 1879–1880 and 1880–1881, were good skating winters, due to the cold conditions. National Skating Association was established in 1879 by James Drake Digby, a journalist from Cambridge, who, impressed by the Fish Smart, the Champion of the Day at Mepal during the severe frost of 1878, decided to address issues of cheating arising from extensive betting. Digby organised a gathering at Cambridge Guildhall, resulting in the creation of the NSA, with the Mayor as chairman and Digby serving as secretary. The newly formed National Skating Association held their first one-and-a-half-mile British professional championship at Thorney in December 1879. There was a field of 32, including former champions Turkey Smart and Tom Watkinson. Fish Smart won, beating Knocker Carter of Welney in the final. His reward was a badge, a sash and a cash prize, given as an annual salary in instalments to encourage the champion to "keep himself temperate".

At 23 years old, he was 5 ft. 9in. high and weighed 12 stone. Dr. I. H. H. Moxon stated, "He is a model of muscular development, combined with lightness and activity; and to use an old phrase, 'looks capable of going anywhere and doing anything.' "

Fish Smart remained unbeatable in the Fens during the winters of 1879–80 and 1880–81. He suffered one defeat in Lancashire when he skated on CarMill Dam against Our Nel's Jack (John Hill) of Billinge, but he had his revenge in a return match at Welney. Fish Smart's nearest rivals during those two winters were his younger brother Jarman Smart, and Albert Dewsberry. In 1880–1881, he successfully defended his title at Crowland, beating Dewsberry in the final.

== 1887–1889 ==
Fish Smart won his third and final championship in January 1887 at Swavesey, in doing so, beating his cousin Isaac See, the younger son of Gutta Percha See, in the final. In the intervening years there had been some short frosts, but the National Skating Association had not managed to arrange a meeting. They had taken Fish Smart to Holland for an international race in January 1885, but he was beaten in the first round by Benedict Kingma.

During the Championship Skating Match in January 1887, about 2,000 persons attended the championship skating match at Grantchester, near Cambridge, when eighteen competed in a three-mile race, with six turns. The track was hard, but some large cracks made the course dangerous, and there were several falls. James Smart, ten miles champion, did the fastest course—namely, 9 min. 52 2-5 sec. He was beaten in the fourth round by Fish Smart, the champion, by half a yard; but in the final heat Fish Smart broke a skate, and Carter, of Welney, won first honours.

James Smart took the British professional title from his older brother George Smart at Lingay Fen in January 1889 and dominated fen skating for the next few years. In January 1891 the NSA arranged a flying start mile for him, which he completed in 3 mins.

== 1897 ==
In the final week of January, 1897, there were daily matches in the Fens, excluding Sunday. Albert Dewesbury emerged victorious against Smart in the Peterborough final but experienced subsequent defeats to Fish in Huntingdon, Ely, Thorney, Swavesey, and at a second match in Peterborough.

== Later life and death ==
He eventually left Welney to work on construction sites around England and had a spell in Egypt working on the unfinished Sudanese railway, but returned to skate in the Fens when it froze. In January 1889, he relinquished his title to his younger brother James. He was killed in an accident while working on the Hull dockyard railway in 1909.
