= Cambridgeshire Collection =

Coordinates: 52.204742°N 0.120525°E

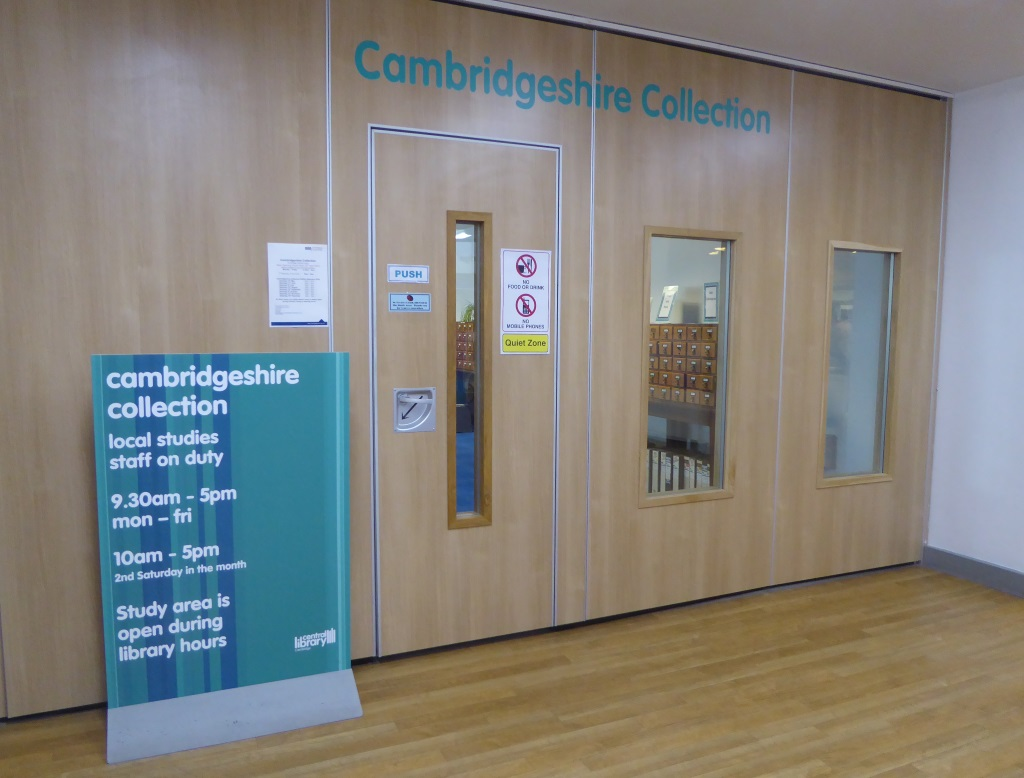
The Cambridgeshire Collection in Cambridge Central Library

The Cambridgeshire Collection is a UK local government institution and part of the Cambridgeshire County Council, Cambridgeshire Libraries Local Studies service. It is housed within Cambridge Central Library It collects printed, published and illustrative material relating to the modern county of Cambridgeshire, which includes the former counties of Huntingdonshire and the Isle of Ely.

Founded as part of the Free Library in 1855, it is the county's reference Local Studies collection. In 1975 it moved into Lion Yard, Cambridge where it is located on the third floor of Cambridge Central Library.

The Cambridgeshire Collection is a reference collection of mainly secondary (printed and published) material; primary documents (original, manuscript) being held in the County Archives at Ely and Huntingdon. Formerly, the service was part of the Cambridgeshire Archives and Local Studies, before these were split, with the archives eventually moving to their new home in 2019.

The Collection is of use to family, local and social historians.
