= Turkey Smart =

Fen Skater

Turkey Smart in the 1890s. Courtesy Cambridgeshire Collection.

William "Turkey" Smart (c. 1830–1919) was a champion speed skater and the first of a dynasty of skaters from the small village of Welney, on the Norfolk/Cambridgeshire border in the centre of the Fens, England.

== Early life and marriage ==
Turkey Smart was born in about 1830 on the banks of the Old Bedford River. He did not go to school and from an early age was working as an agricultural labourer. In 1852, aged 22, he married Susan See, also a 22-year-old agricultural labourer from Welney. They had 11 children (George, Robert, Emma, Henrietta, Harriett, Hannah, William, James, Joseph, Frederic and Mary Ann) of whom only James (born 1865) became a skater.

== Champion of the Fens ==
Turkey Smart’s reign as champion of the Fens began in 1854 when, in a 2-mile race at Welney, he took the title from Larman Register of Southery. With an exceptionally long stroke and low crouching style, Turkey Smart was able to outrun all opposition.

A month’s cold spell in early 1855 saw Turkey Smart winning 13 matches at Outwell, Salter’s Lode, Welney, Benwick, Mepal, March, Deeping, Ely, Peterborough and Wisbech in front of crowds of thousands. Each match consisted of four rounds skated in pairs over a 2-mile course, with the winner and runner-up skating a total of 8 miles in a day. His prize money for that month's skating came to £58 15s and a leg of mutton – the equivalent of about 2 years’ average earnings for an agricultural worker.

Turkey Smart continued his winning streak until 1861, when, hampered by a scythe injury to his leg, he shared the title with his brother-in-law and main rival on ice William "Gutta Percha" See. There followed a series of mild winters and when the championship was next held in 1867 Turkey Smart and Gutta Percha See were outpaced by younger men.

== "A glorious has-been" ==
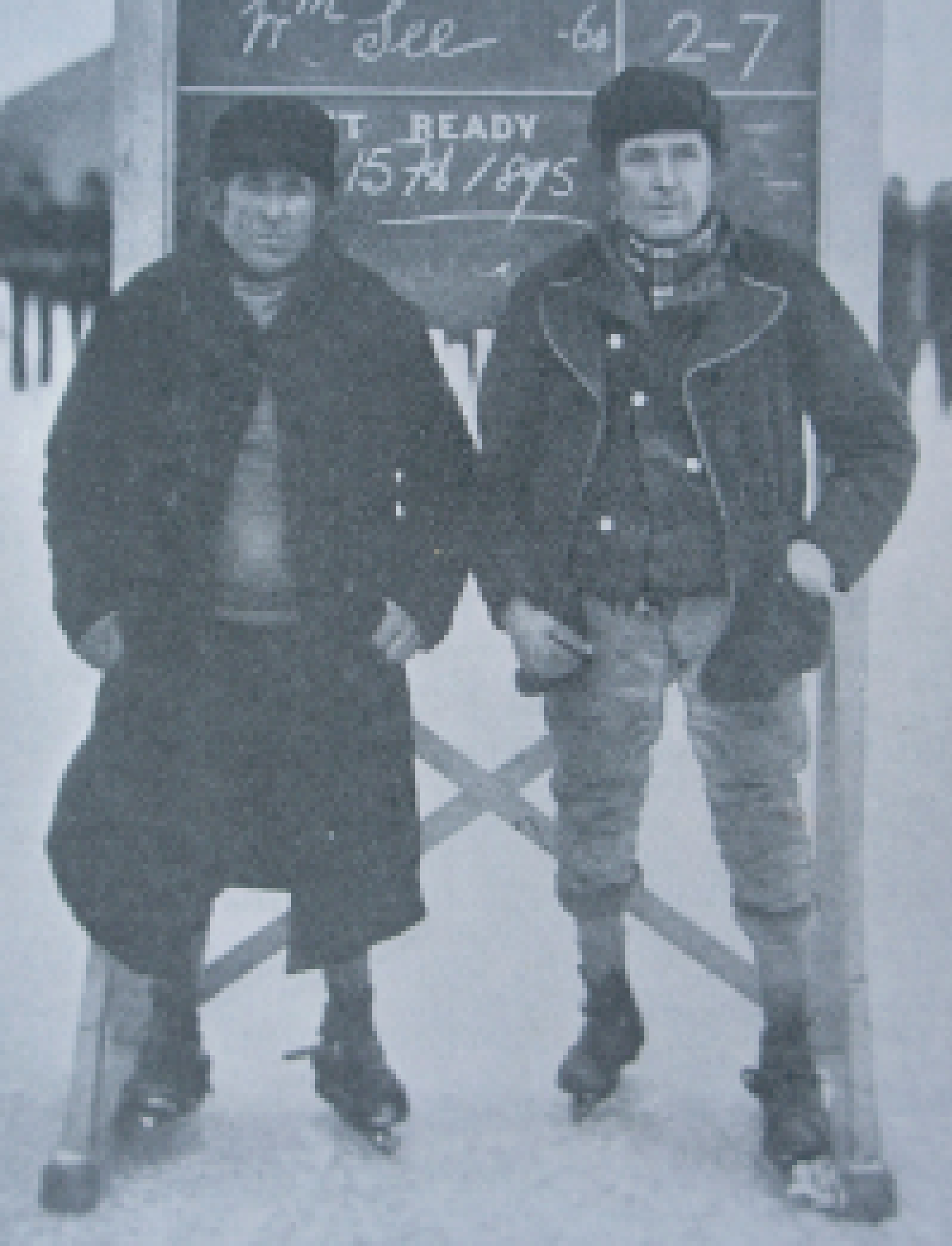
Gutta Percha See and Turkey Smart (right) in 1895.

Undeterred by defeat and a leg injury, Turkey Smart continued to skate competitively into his fifties. An editorial in the Times, written 26 years after Turkey Smart’s death and looking back to the golden age of Fen skating in the last decades of the nineteenth century, described him as "a glorious has-been".

At one match in Mepal in 1878 Turkey Smart and Gutta Percha See (aged 48 and 45 respectively) both won their first rounds. In the second round they were drawn against each other and Gutta Percha See won in a close finish, only to be beaten by his 16-year-old son George "Young Gutty" See in the semi-final. Young Gutty See then lost to his cousin George "Flying Fish" Smart in the final.

Although he usually lost in the early rounds of matches, Turkey Smart was still a force to be reckoned with. In January 1879 he got through three rounds of a match at Littleport, defeating nephew Jarman Smart along the way, only to lose in the semi-final to nephew Young Gutty See. The following day he was beaten by nephew Fish Smart in the second round of a match at Ely. Three days later he was a second-round loser at Swavesey having easily beaten one of Lancashire's best skaters in the first round. Later that year the first British professional championship was held under the auspices of the recently set up National Skating Association. Turkey Smart lost in the first round, but received an ovation from the crowd.

In 1881 Turkey Smart skated in a 1-mile race at Edgbaston Pool, Birmingham, and although coming in behind his fellow fenmen, managed to beat the best of Birmingham by 250 yards.

In his sixties, Turkey Smart was still taking to the ice for exhibition races.

== The next generation ==
Six Smart and See cousins from Welney dominated British skating in the last 2 decades of the nineteenth century. Brothers George 'Fish' Smart, James and Jarman Smart were the sons of Charles Smart and Phoebe See (sister of Susan Smart and Gutta Percha See). James "Young Turkey" Smart was Turkey Smart’s son. George and Isaac See were the sons of Gutta Percha See.

Fish Smart won three consecutive British professional championships in 1879, 1881 and 1887. His brother James was British professional champion in 1889, 1890 and 1895 and also took the title of world professional champion in the Netherlands in 1895. George See was British champion in 1892.

Turkey Smart and his wife both died in 1919. They lost five grandsons in World War I.

== See also ==
- Fen skating
