= List of settlements in Cambridgeshire by population =

The 23 largest settlements of the county of Cambridgeshire, with cities in bold, and district centres in yellow.

This is a list of settlements in Cambridgeshire by population based on the results of the 2021 census. The next United Kingdom census will take place in 2031. In 2021, there were 23 built-up area subdivisions with 5,000 or more inhabitants in Cambridgeshire, shown in the table below.

== Population ranking ==
#	Settlement	Borough/District	Population (2001)	Population (2011)	Population (2021)
1	Peterborough	Peterborough	137,200	161,707	215,673
2	Cambridge / Milton	Cambridge	127,290	145,818	145,674
3	St Neots	Huntingdonshire	27,480	30,252	36,327
4	Wisbech	Fenland	27,957	31,573	33,933
5	Huntingdon	Huntingdonshire	20,760	23,937	25,526
6	March	Fenland	18,040	21,051	21,942
7	Ely	East Cambridgeshire	13,950	19,090	20,112
8	St Ives	Huntingdonshire	16,000	16,384	16,837
9	Whittlesey	Fenland	12,442	12,745	13,401
10	Soham	East Cambridgeshire	7,480	9,165	10,860
11	Chatteris	Fenland	8,649	10,298	10,500
12	Cambourne	South Cambridgeshire	1,200	8,186	10,286
13	Yaxley	Huntingdonshire	7,410	9,174	9,756
14	Littleport	East Cambridgeshire	6,730	7,935	8,882
15	Ramsey	Huntingdonshire	7,667	7,829	8,479
16	Histon	South Cambridgeshire	7,427	7,866	8,193
17	Sawston	South Cambridgeshire	7,281	7,275	7,691
18	Godmanchester	Huntingdonshire	5,835	6,506	6,873
19	Waterbeach	South Cambridgeshire	4,476	5,210	6,711
20	Burwell	East Cambridgeshire	5,833	6,309	6,309
21	Cottenham	South Cambridgeshire	5,478	5,903	6,095
22	Sawtry	Huntingdonshire	5,568	5,252	5,581
23	Brampton	Huntingdonshire	5,030	4,862	5,128
24	Melbourn	South Cambridgeshire	4,414	4,689	4,817
25	Linton	South Cambridgeshire	4,298	4,525	4,525

== See also ==
- Cambridgeshire
- List of towns and cities in England by population
