= Gamsey Wood =

Nature reserve in Cambridgeshire, England

Coordinates: 52.419°N 0.201°W

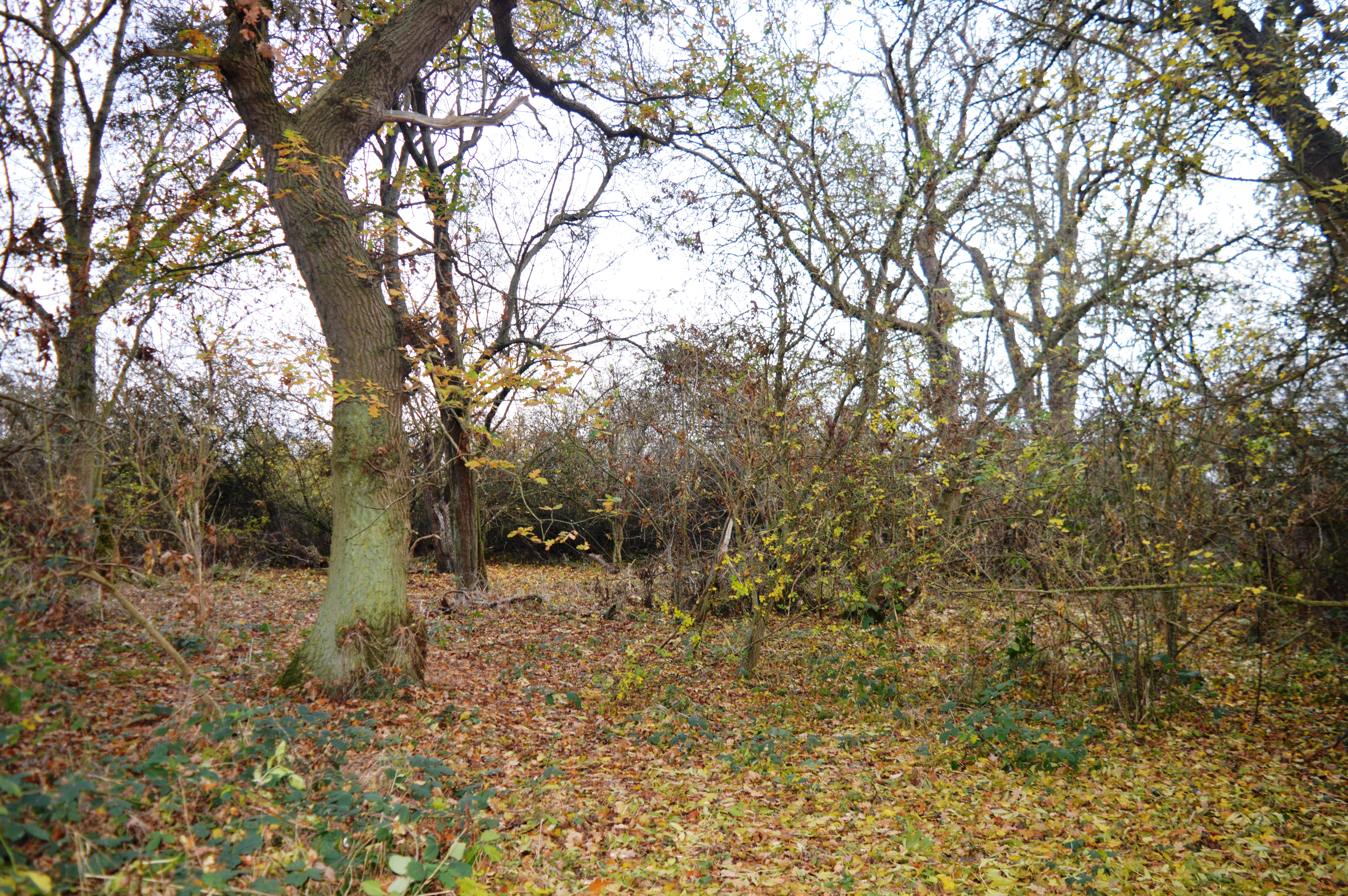
- Interactive map of Gamsey Wood
- Type: Nature reserve
- Location: Woodwalton, Cambridgeshire
- OS grid: TL 225 816
- Area: 4 hectares (9.9 acres)
- Manager: Wildlife Trust for Bedfordshire, Cambridgeshire and Northamptonshire

Gamsey Wood is a 4 hectare nature reserve north-east of Woodwalton in Cambridgeshire. It is managed by the Wildlife Trust for Bedfordshire, Cambridgeshire and Northamptonshire.

The main trees in this wood are ash and field maple, but there are also several wild service trees. Spring flowers include bluebells, wood anemones and yellow archangels, and there are birds such as fieldfares and nightingales.

There is access from Raveley Road by a track through Keeler farm to the reserve entrance at the north-east corner of the site.
