= Charles Goodman Tebbutt =

English speed skater and bandy player

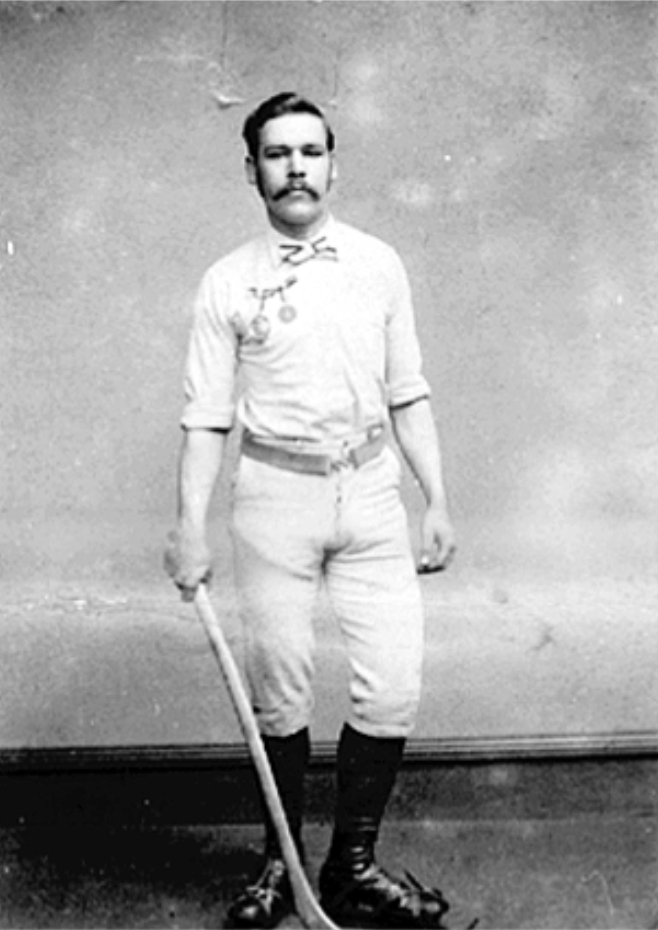

Personal information
- Born: 1860
- Died: 1944

Sport
- Sport: speed skating; bandy

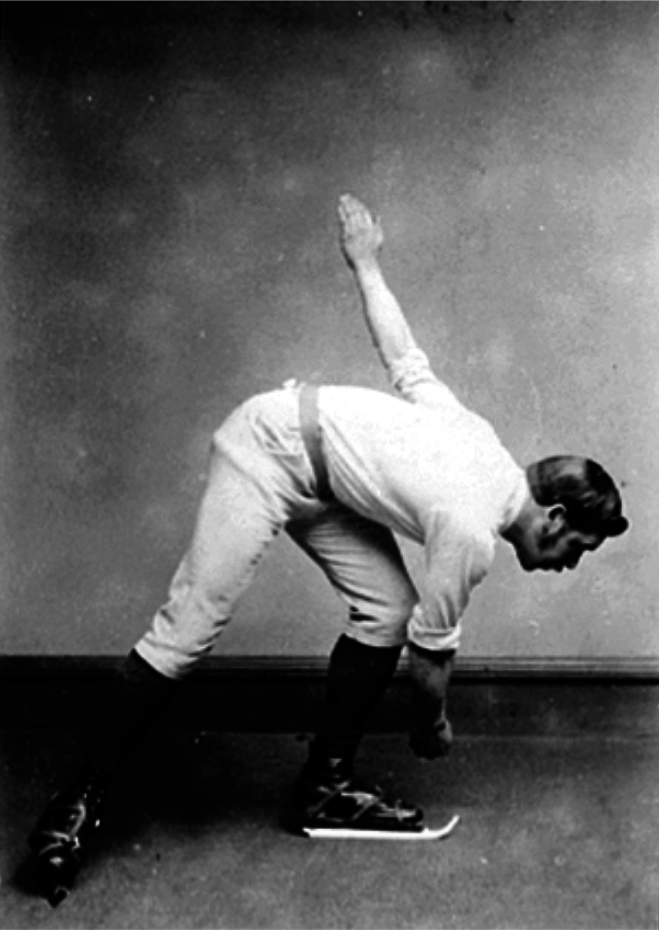
Charles Goodman Tebbutt doing a speed skating pose in 1889

Charles Goodman Tebbutt (1860–1944) was an English speed skater and bandy player from Bluntisham, England, in the Fens of Cambridgeshire where Fen skating was a popular winter activity in the nineteenth century.

He also wrote articles and books about speed skating and bandy, including several chapters in the Badminton Library book Skating (1892) with John Moyer Heathcote. He wrote a chapter on matches in Holland and Sweden in A Handbook of Bandy by Arnold Tebbutt.

He is said to have been the first player to establish the rules of bandy and popularize the sport in Northern Europe, Sweden, Norway and Denmark.
