= British Ice Skating =

UK ice skating governing body

- Sport: Ice skating
- Founded: 1879
- Affiliation: International Skating Union
- Headquarters: English Institute of Sport Coleridge Road Sheffield S9 5DA
- President: Pam Aguss
- CEO: Maggie Still

Official website
- www.iceskating.org.uk
- (United Kingdom)

British Ice Skating (formerly the National Ice Skating Association) is the national governing body of ice skating within the United Kingdom. Formed in 1879, it is responsible for overseeing all disciplines of ice skating: figure skating (singles, pairs and ice dance); synchronised skating; and speed skating (including short track).

== History ==
On Saturday 1 February 1879 a number of prominent men of Cambridgeshire and Huntingdonshire met in the Guildhall, Cambridge, to set up the National Skating Association with the aim of regulating the sport of fen skating. A Cambridge journalist, James Drake Digby, had thought that the Fen speed skaters were worthy of national recognition and he was also concerned that betting was leading to malpractice. He thought that skating needed a national organisation to control it, like the Jockey Club. The founding committee included several landowners, a vicar, a fellow of Trinity College, a magistrate, two members of parliament, the mayor of Cambridge, the Lord Lieutenant of Cambridgeshire, the president of the University of Cambridge Skating Club, and Neville Goodman, a graduate of Peterhouse, Cambridge. Even though the National Skating Association was formed to regulate speed skating, figure skaters began joining the organization within a year of its founding.

The newly formed National Skating Association held their first one-and-a-half-mile British professional championship at Thorney in December 1879. There was a field of 32, including former champions Turkey Smart and Tom Watkinson. Fish Smart beat Knocker Carter in the final. His reward was a badge, a sash and a cash prize, given as an annual salary in instalments to encourage the champion to "keep himself temperate". The NSA also established an amateur championship, which was held for the first time at Welsh Harp, London, in January 1880, and won by Frederick Norman, a farmer's son from Willingham. The professionals were labourers who skated for cash prizes; the amateurs were gentlemen who skated for trophies.

In 1892 the NSA aided in the foundation of the International Skating Union (ISU). The NSA hosted the first international ice skating competition in Britain in Birmingham in 1899 and has hosted all events in the UK since in various locations.

In 1894 the National Skating Association decided to move their headquarters from Cambridge to London, from where they concentrated on figure skaters and rinkmen. Their new base, the National Skating Palace, is now better known as the London Palladium.

Until 1990, when an independent society was formed, the NSA was also the UK's governing body of roller skating. As a consequence of the segmentation, the NSA became NISA (National Ice Skating Association), the headquarters of which are now based in Nottingham.

In November 2018, the National Ice Skating Association began rebranding as British Ice Skating.
