= Cambridgeshire =

County of England

- Non-metropolitan and ceremonial county
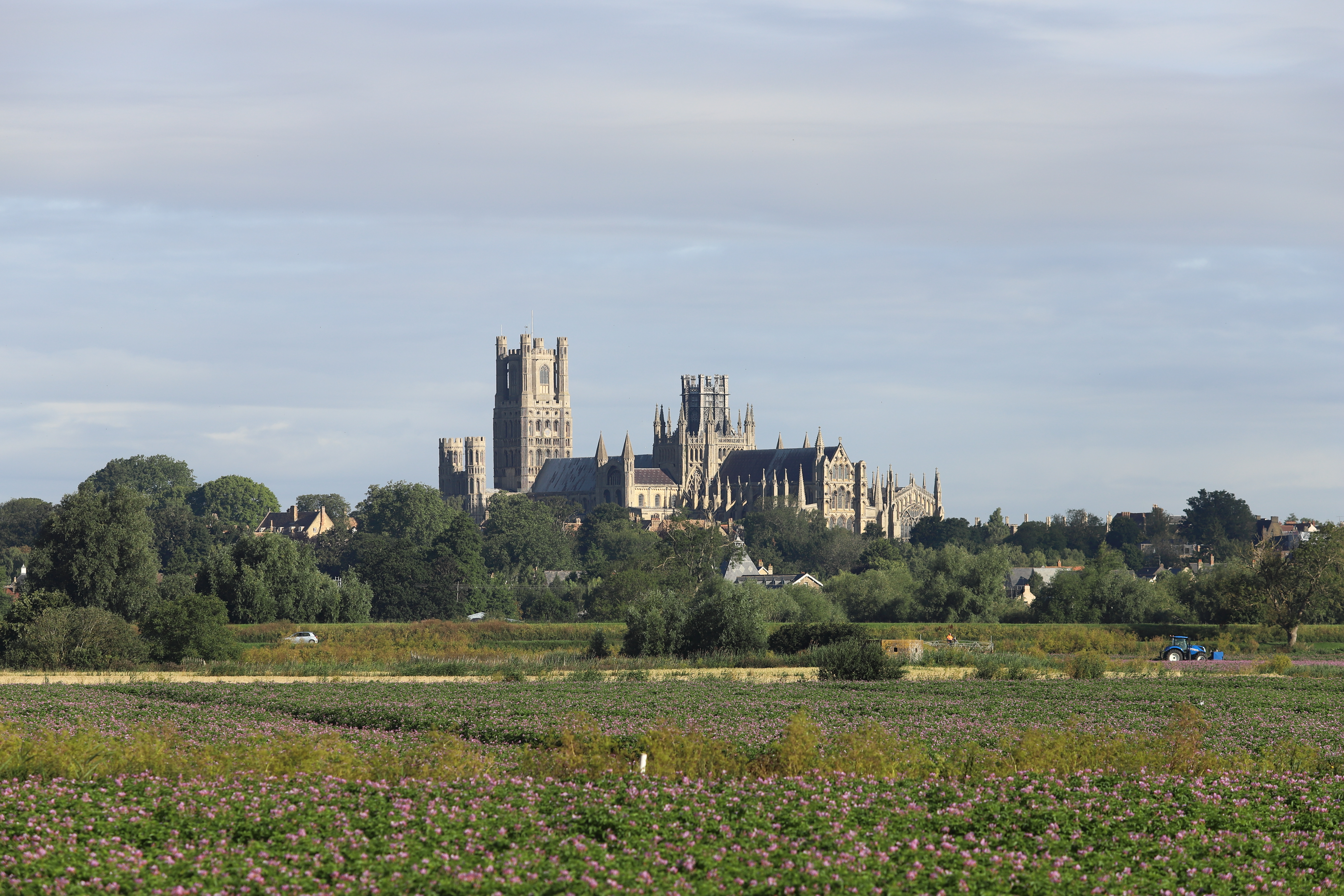
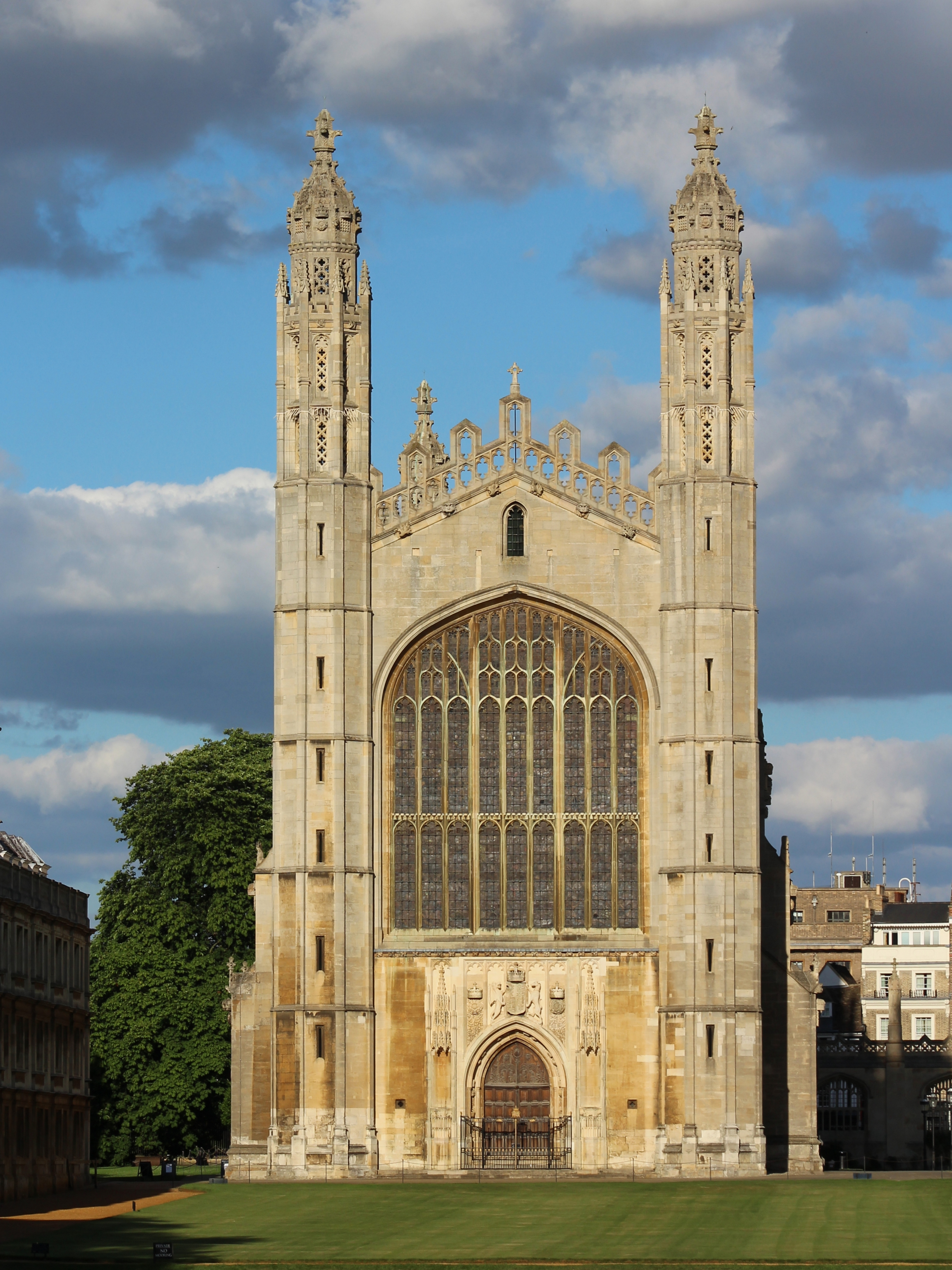
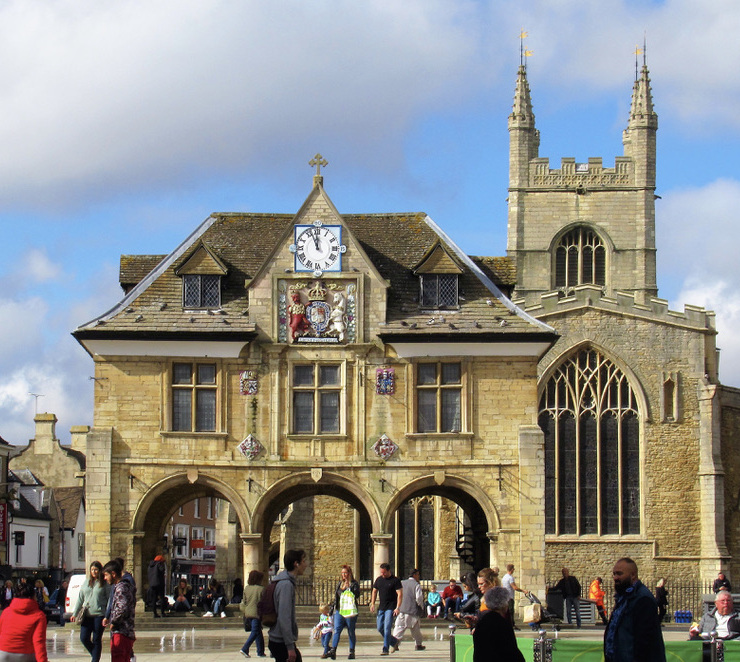
- Clockwise from top: Ely Cathedral from the Fens; the Guildhall in Peterborough; and the chapel of King's College, part of the University of Cambridge

- Coordinates: 52°21′N 0°0′W
- Sovereign state: United Kingdom
- Constituent country: England
- Region: East of England
- Established: 1 April 1974
- Established by: Local Government Act 1972
- Preceded by: Cambridgeshire and Isle of Ely; Huntingdon and Peterborough
- Origin: Ancient
- Time zone: UTC+0 (GMT)
  - Summer (DST): UTC+1 (BST)
- UK Parliament: 8 MPs
- Police: Cambridgeshire Constabulary
- County town: Cambridge
- Largest city: Peterborough
- Ceremonial county
- Lord Lieutenant: Julie Spence
- High Sheriff: Francis William Miles Burkitt
- Area: 3,390 km^{2} (1,310 sq mi)
  - Rank: 15th of 48
- Population (2024): 933,972
  - Rank: 26th of 48
  - Density: 276/km^{2} (710/sq mi)
- Non-metropolitan county
- County council: Cambridgeshire County Council
- Control: Liberal Democrat
- Admin HQ: New Shire Hall, Alconbury Weald
- Area: 3,046 km^{2} (1,176 sq mi)
  - Rank: 8th of 21
- Population (2025): 716,983
  - Rank: 17th of 21
  - Density: 235/km^{2} (610/sq mi)
- ISO 3166-2: GB-CAM
- GSS code: E10000003
- ITL: UKH12
- Website: cambridgeshire.gov.uk
- Unitary authorities
- Councils: Peterborough City Council
- Districts
- Districts of Cambridgeshire; Unitary County council area
- Districts: List: Peterborough; Fenland; Huntingdonshire; East Cambridgeshire; South Cambridgeshire; Cambridge

Cambridgeshire (abbreviated Cambs.) is a ceremonial county in the East of England and East Anglia. It is bordered by Lincolnshire to the north, Norfolk to the north-east, Suffolk to the east, Essex and Hertfordshire to the south, Northamptonshire to the west, and Bedfordshire to the south-west. The city of Peterborough is the largest settlement.

The county has an area of 3,389 km^{2} (1,309 sq mi) and had an estimated population of 906,814 in 2022. Peterborough is in the north-west and the city of Cambridge in the south. The remainder of the county is rural, and contains the city of Ely in the east, Wisbech in the north-east, and St Neots and Huntingdon in the west. For local government purposes Cambridgeshire comprises a non-metropolitan county, with five districts, and the unitary authority area of Peterborough; their local authorities collaborate through Cambridgeshire and Peterborough Combined Authority. The county did not historically include Huntingdonshire or the Soke of Peterborough, which was part of Northamptonshire.

The north and east of the county are dominated by the Fens, an extremely flat, drained marsh maintained by drainage ditches and dykes; Holme Fen is the UK's lowest physical point, at 2.75 m (9 ft) below sea level. The flatness of the landscape makes the few areas of higher ground, such as that Ely is built on, very conspicuous. The landscape in the south and west is gently undulating. Cambridgeshire's principal rivers are the Nene, which flows through the north of the county and is canalised east of Peterborough; the Great Ouse, which flows from west to east past Huntingdon and Ely; and the Cam, a tributary of the Great Ouse which flows through Cambridge.

== History ==
Cambridgeshire is noted as the site of Flag Fen in Fengate, one of the earliest-known Neolithic permanent settlements in the United Kingdom, compared in importance to Balbridie in Aberdeen, Scotland. Must Farm quarry, at Whittlesey, has been described as "Britain's Pompeii due to its relatively good condition, including the 'best-preserved Bronze Age dwellings ever found in the UK'". A great quantity of archaeological finds from the Stone Age, the Bronze Age, and the Iron Age were made in East Cambridgeshire. Most items were found in Isleham.

The area was settled by the Anglo-Saxons starting in the fifth century. Genetic testing on seven skeletons found in Anglo-Saxon era graves in Hinxton and Oakington found that five were either migrants or descended from migrants from the continent, one was a native Briton, and one had both continental and native ancestry, suggesting intermarriage.

Map showing the historical administrative boundaries in the modern ceremonial county of Cambridgeshire. Historical administrative counties showed in the background, short-lived combined counties of 1965–1974 in red outlines, and modern county council areas, unitary authorities, and districts in black outlines.

Cambridgeshire was recorded in the Domesday Book as "Grantbridgeshire" (or rather Grentebriġesċīre) (related to the river Granta). Covering a large part of East Anglia, Cambridgeshire today is the result of several local government unifications. In 1888 when county councils were introduced, separate councils were set up, following the traditional division of Cambridgeshire, for

- the area in the south around Cambridge, and
- the liberty of the Isle of Ely.

In 1965, these two administrative counties were merged to form Cambridgeshire and the Isle of Ely. Under the Local Government Act 1972 this merged with the county to the west, Huntingdon and Peterborough, which had been formed in 1965, by the merger of Huntingdonshire with the Soke of Peterborough (the latter previously a part of Northamptonshire with its own county council). The resulting county was called simply Cambridgeshire.

Since 1998, the City of Peterborough has been separately administered as a unitary authority area. It is associated with Cambridgeshire for ceremonial purposes such as Lieutenancy and joint functions such as policing and the fire service.

In 2002, the conservation charity Plantlife unofficially designated Cambridgeshire's county flower as the Pasqueflower.

The Cambridgeshire Regiment (nicknamed the Fen Tigers), the county-based army unit, fought in the Boer War in South Africa, the First World War and Second World War.

Due to the county's flat terrain and proximity to the continent, during the Second World War the military built many airfields here for RAF Bomber Command, RAF Fighter Command, and the USAAF. In recognition of this collaboration, the Cambridge American Cemetery and Memorial is located in Madingley.

Most English counties have nicknames for their people, such as a "Tyke" from Yorkshire and a "Yellowbelly" from Lincolnshire. The historical nicknames for people from Cambridgeshire are "Cambridgeshire Camel" or "Cambridgeshire Crane", the latter referring to the wildfowl that were once abundant in the Fens. The term "Fen Tigers" is sometimes used to describe the people who live and work in the Fens.

== Flag ==
The flag of the county of Cambridgeshire

Cambridgeshire's county flag was selected as an entry from a design competition that ran during 2014. The design features three golden crowns, two on the top, one on the bottom that are separated by two wavy lines in the middle. The crowns are meant to represent East Anglia, and the two lines represent the River Cam and are in Cambridge University's colours.

== Geography ==
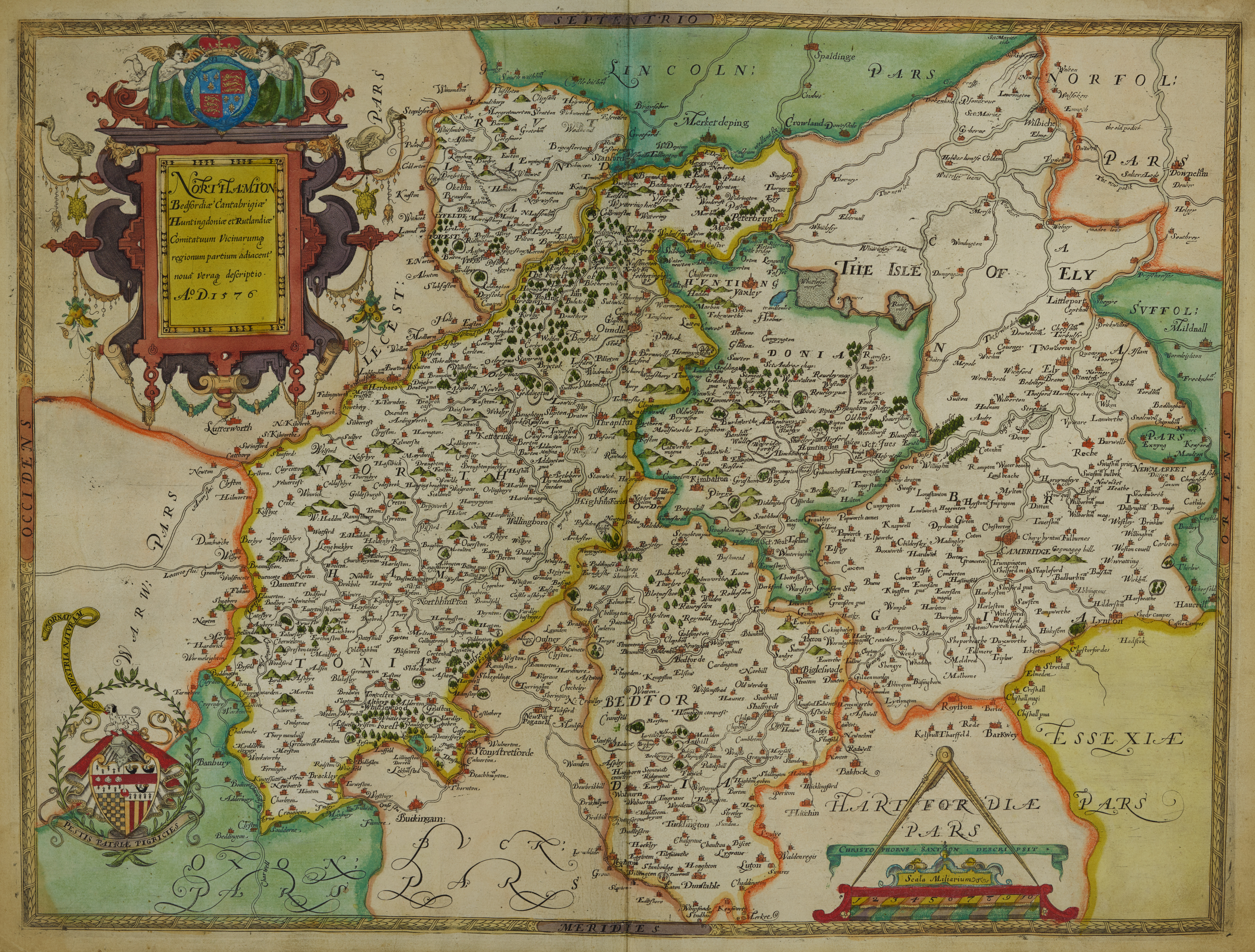
Hand-drawn map of Northampshire, Bedfordshire, Cambridgeshire, Huntingdonshire and Rutland by Christopher Saxton from 1576

Large areas of the county are extremely low-lying and Holme Fen is notable for being the UK's lowest physical point at 2.75 m (9 ft) below sea level. The highest point of the modern administrative county is in the village of Great Chishill at 146 m (480 ft) above sea level. However, this parish was historically a part of Essex, having been moved to Cambridgeshire in boundary changes in 1895. The historic county top is close to the village of Castle Camps where a point on the disused RAF airfield reaches a height of 128 metres (420 ft) above sea level (grid reference TL 63282 41881).

Other prominent hills are Little Trees Hill and Wandlebury Hill (both at 74 m (243 ft)) in the Gog Magog Hills, Rivey Hill above Linton, Rowley's Hill and the Madingley Hills.

Wicken Fen is a 254.5-hectare (629-acre) biological Site of Special Scientific Interest west of Wicken. A large part of it is owned and managed by the National Trust.

The Cambridge Green Belt around the city of Cambridge extends to places such as Waterbeach, Lode, Duxford, Little & Great Abington and other communities a few miles away in nearby districts, to afford a protection from the conurbation. It was first drawn up in the 1950s.

== Politics ==
The coat of arms of Cambridgeshire County Council

Cambridgeshire County Council is controlled by the Liberal Democrats, while Peterborough City Council is currently controlled by a Conservative Party minority administration.

The county contains eight Parliamentary constituencies:

Parliamentary constituencies in Cambridgeshire
Constituency	Member of Parliament (MP)	Party
Cambridge	Daniel Zeichner	Labour
Huntingdon	Ben Obese-Jecty	Conservative
North East Cambridgeshire	Steve Barclay	Conservative
North West Cambridgeshire	Sam Carling	Labour
Peterborough	Andrew Pakes	Labour
South Cambridgeshire	Pippa Heylings	Liberal Democrats
St Neots and Mid Cambridgeshire	Ian Sollom	Liberal Democrats
East Cambridgeshire	Charlotte Cane	Liberal Democrats

=== Proposed local government reorganisation ===
As of 2026, there are four separate proposals for local government in Cambridgeshire and Peterborough to be reorganised into two new unitary authorities, which would replace the existing structure of the county council and six districts (including Peterborough). Government consultation on these four proposals ran from 5 February 2026 to 26 March 2026.

== Economy ==
This is a chart of trend of regional gross value added of Cambridgeshire at current basic prices.

Year	Regional Gross Value Added (Note: Components may not sum to totals due to rounding)	Agriculture (Note: includes hunting and forestry)	Industry (Note: includes energy and construction)	Services (Note: includes financial intermediation services indirectly measured)
1995	£5,896M	£228M	£1,646M	£4,022M
2000	£7,996M	£166M	£2,029M	£5,801M
2003	£10,154M	£207M	£2,195M	£7,752M

AWG plc is based in Huntingdon. The RAF has several stations in the Huntingdon and St Ives area. RAF Alconbury, three miles north of Huntingdon, is being reorganised after a period of obsolescence following the departure of the USAF, to be the focus of RAF/USAFE intelligence operations, with activities at Upwood and Molesworth being transferred there. Most of Cambridgeshire is agricultural. Close to Cambridge is the so-called Silicon Fen area of high-technology (electronics, computing and biotechnology) companies. ARM Limited is based in Cherry Hinton. The inland Port of Wisbech on the River Nene is the county's only remaining port.

== Education ==
=== Primary and secondary ===
Cambridgeshire has a comprehensive education system with over 240 state schools, not including sixth form colleges. The independent sector includes King's Ely and Wisbech Grammar School, founded in 970 and 1379 respectively, they are two of the oldest schools in the country.

Some of the secondary schools act as Village Colleges, institutions unique to Cambridgeshire. For example, Comberton Village College.

=== Tertiary ===
Cambridgeshire is home to a number of institutes of higher education:

- The University of Cambridge – second-oldest university in the English-speaking world, and regarded as one of the most prestigious academic institutions in the world
- Anglia Ruskin University – has campuses located in Cambridge and Peterborough and a base at Fulbourn
- The Open University – has a regional centre located in Cambridge
- The University Centre Peterborough – operated by Anglia Ruskin University and Peterborough Regional College, located in Peterborough
- The College of West Anglia has a campus at Milton, on the northern outskirts of Cambridge and a campus at Wisbech.

In addition, Cambridge Regional College and Huntingdonshire Regional College both offer a limited range of higher education courses in conjunction with partner universities.

== Settlements ==
Map of the Cambridgeshire area (1904).

These are the settlements in Cambridgeshire with a town charter, city status or a population over 5,000; for a complete list of settlements see list of places in Cambridgeshire.

- Burwell
- Cambourne
- Cambridge
- Chatteris
- Cottenham
- Ely
- Godmanchester
- Huntingdon
- Littleport
- March
- Peterborough
- Ramsey
- Sawston
- Sawtry
- Soham
- St Ives
- St Neots
- Wisbech
- Whittlesey
- Yaxley

See the List of Cambridgeshire settlements by population page for more detail.

The town of Newmarket is surrounded on three sides by Cambridgeshire, being connected by a narrow strip of land to the rest of Suffolk.

Cambridgeshire has seen 32,869 dwellings created from 2002 to 2013 and there are a further 35,360 planned new dwellings between 2016 and 2023.

== Climate ==
Cambridgeshire has a maritime temperate climate which is broadly similar to the rest of the United Kingdom, though it is drier than the UK average due to its low altitude and easterly location, the prevailing southwesterly winds having already deposited moisture on higher ground further west. Average winter temperatures are cooler than the English average, due to Cambridgeshire's inland location and relative nearness to continental Europe, which results in the moderating maritime influence being less strong. Snowfall is slightly more common than in western areas, due to the relative winter coolness and easterly winds bringing occasional snow from the North Sea. In summer temperatures are average or slightly above, due to less cloud cover. It reaches 25 °C (77 °F) on around ten days each year, and is comparable to parts of Kent and East Anglia.

Climate data for Cambridge University Botanic Garden, (Note: Weather station is located 0.8 miles (1.3 km) from the Cambridge city centre.) elevation: 13 m (43 ft), 1991–2020 normals, extremes 1914–present
Month	Jan	Feb	Mar	Apr	May	Jun	Jul	Aug	Sep	Oct	Nov	Dec	Year
Record high °C (°F)	15.7 (60.3)	18.8 (65.8)	23.9 (75.0)	27.9 (82.2)	34.0 (93.2)	35.0 (95.0)	39.9 (103.8)	36.9 (98.4)	33.9 (93.0)	29.0 (84.2)	21.1 (70.0)	16.0 (60.8)	39.9 (103.8)
Mean daily maximum °C (°F)	7.8 (46.0)	8.6 (47.5)	11.5 (52.7)	14.6 (58.3)	18.0 (64.4)	20.8 (69.4)	23.3 (73.9)	22.9 (73.2)	19.9 (67.8)	15.3 (59.5)	10.9 (51.6)	8.1 (46.6)	15.1 (59.2)
Daily mean °C (°F)	4.8 (40.6)	5.2 (41.4)	7.3 (45.1)	9.7 (49.5)	12.8 (55.0)	15.6 (60.1)	17.9 (64.2)	17.7 (63.9)	15.0 (59.0)	11.4 (52.5)	7.5 (45.5)	5.0 (41.0)	10.8 (51.4)
Mean daily minimum °C (°F)	1.7 (35.1)	1.7 (35.1)	3.1 (37.6)	4.7 (40.5)	7.5 (45.5)	10.5 (50.9)	12.6 (54.7)	12.5 (54.5)	10.2 (50.4)	7.4 (45.3)	4.2 (39.6)	1.9 (35.4)	6.5 (43.7)
Record low °C (°F)	−16.1 (3.0)	−17.2 (1.0)	−11.7 (10.9)	−6.1 (21.0)	−4.4 (24.1)	−0.6 (30.9)	2.2 (36.0)	3.3 (37.9)	−2.2 (28.0)	−6.5 (20.3)	−13.3 (8.1)	−15.6 (3.9)	−17.2 (1.0)
Average precipitation mm (inches)	47.2 (1.86)	35.9 (1.41)	32.2 (1.27)	36.2 (1.43)	43.9 (1.73)	52.3 (2.06)	53.2 (2.09)	57.6 (2.27)	49.3 (1.94)	56.5 (2.22)	54.4 (2.14)	49.8 (1.96)	568.4 (22.38)
Average precipitation days (≥ 1.0 mm)	10.7	8.9	8.1	7.9	7.4	8.7	8.4	8.7	8.1	9.5	10.5	10.3	107.3
Average relative humidity (%)	86.0	82.5	78.6	74.6	74.8	73.9	72.5	73.7	77.5	83.3	87.0	87.8	79.4
Source 1: ECA&D
Source 2: Weather.Directory

Climate data for Cambridge (NIAB) (Note: Weather station is located 3 miles (4.8 km) from the Cambridge city centre.), elevation: 26 m (85 ft), 1991–2020 normals, extremes 1959–present
Month	Jan	Feb	Mar	Apr	May	Jun	Jul	Aug	Sep	Oct	Nov	Dec	Year
Record high °C (°F)	15.4 (59.7)	18.3 (64.9)	23.9 (75.0)	26.9 (80.4)	33.4 (92.1)	35.8 (96.4)	39.9 (103.8)	36.1 (97.0)	32.0 (89.6)	29.3 (84.7)	18.3 (64.9)	16.1 (61.0)	39.9 (103.8)
Mean daily maximum °C (°F)	7.7 (45.9)	8.3 (46.9)	11.0 (51.8)	14.1 (57.4)	17.4 (63.3)	20.4 (68.7)	23.1 (73.6)	22.9 (73.2)	19.6 (67.3)	15.1 (59.2)	10.7 (51.3)	8.0 (46.4)	14.9 (58.8)
Daily mean °C (°F)	4.8 (40.6)	5.0 (41.0)	7.0 (44.6)	9.4 (48.9)	12.4 (54.3)	15.4 (59.7)	17.8 (64.0)	17.7 (63.9)	15.0 (59.0)	11.5 (52.7)	7.6 (45.7)	5.1 (41.2)	10.7 (51.3)
Mean daily minimum °C (°F)	1.9 (35.4)	1.8 (35.2)	3.1 (37.6)	4.6 (40.3)	7.4 (45.3)	10.5 (50.9)	12.6 (54.7)	12.6 (54.7)	10.5 (50.9)	7.9 (46.2)	4.5 (40.1)	2.2 (36.0)	6.7 (44.1)
Record low °C (°F)	−16.0 (3.2)	−15.3 (4.5)	−9.4 (15.1)	−5.9 (21.4)	−1.8 (28.8)	0.0 (32.0)	4.8 (40.6)	3.3 (37.9)	−0.6 (30.9)	−5.4 (22.3)	−8.9 (16.0)	−12.5 (9.5)	−16.0 (3.2)
Average precipitation mm (inches)	48.6 (1.91)	35.7 (1.41)	32.9 (1.30)	37.6 (1.48)	43.2 (1.70)	49.1 (1.93)	48.3 (1.90)	55.9 (2.20)	47.6 (1.87)	58.7 (2.31)	52.6 (2.07)	49.2 (1.94)	559.4 (22.02)
Average precipitation days (≥ 1.0 mm)	10.4	8.7	8.1	8.0	7.3	8.7	8.4	9.0	8.0	9.6	10.4	10.5	107.2
Mean monthly sunshine hours	57.2	77.8	118.4	157.2	182.7	182.5	190.0	181.3	144.0	110.3	67.6	53.7	1,522.7
Source 1: Met Office
Source 2: Starlings Roost Weather

== Culture ==
=== Sports ===
Various forms of football have been popular in Cambridgeshire since medieval times at least. In 1579 one match played at Chesterton between townspeople and University of Cambridge students ended in a violent brawl that led the Vice-Chancellor to issue a decree forbidding them to play "footeball" outside of college grounds. During the nineteenth century, several formulations of the laws of football, known as the Cambridge rules, were created by students at the university. One of these codes, dating from 1863, had a significant influence on the creation of the original laws of the Football Association.

Cambridgeshire is also the birthplace of bandy, now an IOC accepted sport. According to documents from 1813, Bury Fen Bandy Club was undefeated for 100 years. A member of the club, Charles Goodman Tebbutt, wrote down the first official rules in 1882. Tebbutt was instrumental in spreading the sport to many countries. Great Britain Bandy Association is based in Cambridgeshire.

Fen skating is a traditional form of skating in the Fenland. The National Ice Skating Association was set up in Cambridge in 1879, they took the top Fen skaters to the world speedskating championships where James Smart (skater) became world champion.

On 6–7 June 2015, the inaugural Tour of Cambridgeshire cycle race took place on closed roads across the county. The event was an official UCI qualification event, and consisted of a Time Trial on the 6th, and a Gran Fondo event on the 7th. The Gran Fondo event was open to the public, and over 6000 riders took part in the 128 km (80 mi) race.

The River Cam is the main river flowing through Cambridge, parts of the River Nene and River Great Ouse lie within the county. In 2021 the latter was used as the course for The Boat Race. The River Cam serves as the course for the university Lent Bumps and May Bumps and the non-college rowing organised by Cambridgeshire Rowing Association.

There is only one racecourse in Cambridgeshire, located at Huntingdon.

=== Contemporary art ===
Cambridge is home to the Kettle's Yard gallery and the artist-run Aid and Abet project space. Nine miles west of Cambridge next to the village of Bourn is Wysing Arts Centre. Wisbech has been home to the Wisbech Gallery, South Brink since 2023. Cambridge Open Studios is the region's large arts organisation with over 500 members. Every year, more than 370 artists open their doors to visitors during four weekends in July.

=== Literature ===
The annual Fenland Poet Laureate awards were instigated for poets in the North of the county in 2012 at Wisbech & Fenland Museum.

=== Theatre ===
The county was visited by travelling companies of comedians in the Georgian period. These came from different companies. The Lincoln Circuit included, at various times, Wisbech and Whittlesey. The Wisbech Georgian theatre still survives as an operating theatre now known as The Angles Theatre. In Cambridge the ADC Theatre is the venue for the Footlights.

== Media ==
The county is covered by BBC East and ITV Anglia. Local radio includes BBC Radio Cambridgeshire, Greatest Hits Radio East, Heart East, Smooth East Midlands (only covering Peterborough), and Hits Radio Cambridgeshire (formerly known as Star Radio). The community radio stations are Black Cat Radio in St Neots; Cam FM and Cambridge Radio in Cambridge; Huntingdon Community Radio; and Peterborough Community Radio and Salaam Radio in Peterborough.

== Places of interest ==
Key
	Abbey/Priory/Cathedral
Accessible open space	Accessible open space
	Amusement/Theme Park
	Castle
Country Park	Country Park
	English Heritage
	Forestry Commission
Heritage railway	Heritage railway
Historic house	Historic House
Places of Worship	Places of Worship
Museum (free) Museum	Museum (free/not free)
National Trust	National Trust
	Theatre
	Zoo

- Angles Theatre
- Anglesey Abbey
- Brampton Wood
- Buckden Towers
- Cambridge American Cemetery and Memorial
- Cambridge University Museum of Zoology
- Castor Hanglands NNR
- Cherry Hinton Chalk Pits
- Denny Abbey
- Devil's Dyke
- Down Field Windmill
- Duxford Chapel
- Duxford Airfield
- Elton Hall
- Ely Cathedral
- Fitzwilliam Museum, Cambridge
- Flag Fen
- Fowlmere RSPB reserve
- Gamsey Wood Nature Reserve
- Grafham Water Nature Reserve
- Great Gransden Post Mill
- Hereward Way
- Hinchingbrooke House
- Houghton Mill
- Icknield Way
- Imperial War Museum Duxford
- Kettle's Yard
- Kimbolton Castle
- King's College, Cambridge
- Lattersey Nature Reserve
- Lode Watermill
- Longthorpe Tower
- Magog Down
- March & District Museum
- Milton Country Park
- Nene Park
- Nene Valley Railway
- Nene Way
- New Bedford River
- Octavia Hill Birthplace House
- Old Bedford River
- Oliver Cromwell's House
- Ouse Valley Way
- Ouse Washes
- Parker's Piece, Cambridge, birthplace of modern football
- Paxton Pits Nature Reserve
- Peckover House & Garden
- Peterborough Cathedral
- Port of Wisbech
- Prickwillow Drainage Engine Museum
- Ramsey Abbey
- River Cam
- River Great Ouse
- River Nene
- Round Church, Cambridge
- RSPB Nene Washes
- RSPB Ouse Washes
- Stretham Old Engine
- Three Shires Bridleway
- University of Cambridge Museum of Archaeology and Anthropology
- Wandlebury Country Park
- Wicken Fen
- Wimpole Hall
- Wisbech Castle
- Wisbech & Fenland Museum
- Wisbech and March Bramley Line
- WWT Welney
- Wysing Arts Centre

== Notable people from Cambridgeshire ==
- Emma Bridgewater, founder of Emma Bridgewater
- Oliver Cromwell (1599–1658), Roundhead commander in the English Civil War from 1642 to 1651, and Lord Protector of the Commonwealth of England, Scotland and Ireland from 1653 to 1658

== See also ==
- Cambridgeshire (UK Parliament constituency) – Historical list of MPs for Cambridgeshire constituency
- Cambridgeshire Archives and Local Studies
- Cambridgeshire Constabulary
- Cambridgeshire local elections
- Cambridgeshire Police and Crime Commissioner
- Custos Rotulorum of Cambridgeshire – Keepers of the Rolls for Cambridgeshire
- Healthcare in Cambridgeshire
- List of English and Welsh endowed schools (19th century)#Cambridgeshire
- List of High sheriffs of Cambridgeshire
- List of Lord Lieutenants of Cambridgeshire
- The Hundred Parishes

== Bibliography ==
- Arnold, F. (1878), "County of Cambridge" , in Baynes, T. S. (ed.), Encyclopædia Britannica, vol. 4 (9th ed.), New York: Charles Scribner's Sons, pp. 726–728
