= Carr Mill Dam =

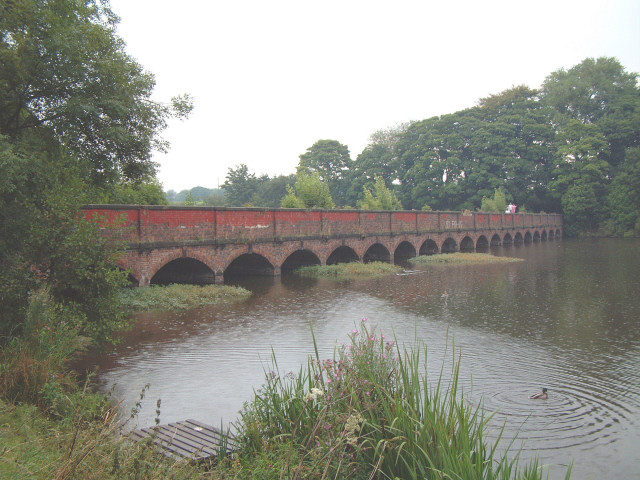
- Viaduct across the northern part of the dam

- Location within the United Kingdom
- Location: St. Helens, Merseyside, England
- Coordinates: 53.477°N 2.715°W
- Type: Reservoir
- Etymology: "Carr" meaning Marsh or Fen from the Norse.
- Surface area: 55 acres (22 ha)

Carr Mill Dam is situated north of St Helens town centre, on the A571 (Carr Mill Road), in Merseyside. At 55 acres, it is the largest body of inland water in the area, and offers picturesque lakeside trails and walks, as well as national competitive powerboating and angling events. It is home of Lancashire Powerboat Racing Club established in 1923 where club, national and international powerboat racing takes place.

The name Carr Mill traditionally came from the Norse word 'Carr' meaning marsh or fen. Once simply a mill pond built to power a corn mill, the dam is shown on William Yates's 1786 Map of Lancashire, with the mill adjacent. The land itself belonged to the Gerard family and a lease details the permissions and extent of use of the occupants. The waters were expanded significantly in the 1750s in order to provide water to the Sankey Brook Navigation, about a mile away. The dam was further enlarged by the London and North Western Railway during construction and cast iron marker posts are still visible at two points around the dam.

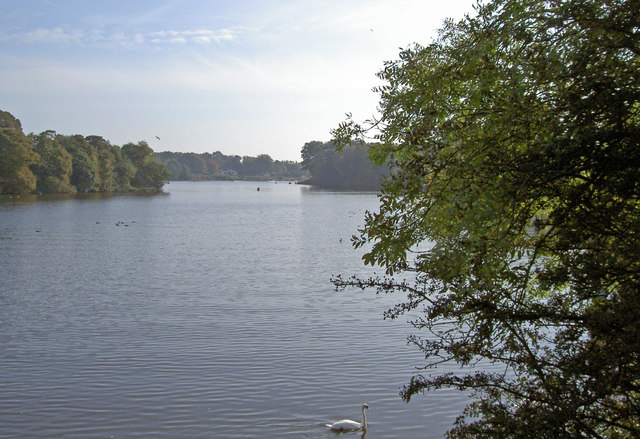
Carr Mill Dam
