= Southery =

Village in Norfolk, England

Coordinates: 52.526°N 0.388°E

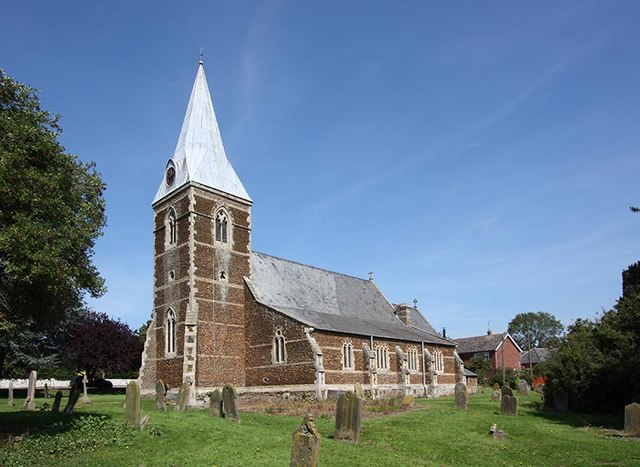
- St Mary, Southery

- Location within Norfolk
- Area: 18.12 km^{2} (7.00 sq mi)
- Population: 1,324 (2011)
  - Density: 73/km^{2} (190/sq mi)
- OS grid reference: TL621946
- Civil parish: Southery
- District: King's Lynn and West Norfolk
- Shire county: Norfolk
- Region: East
- Country: England
- Sovereign state: United Kingdom
- Post town: DOWNHAM MARKET
- Postcode district: PE38
- Dialling code: 01366
- Police: Norfolk
- Fire: Norfolk
- Ambulance: East of England
- UK Parliament: South West Norfolk

Southery is a village and civil parish in Norfolk, England. It is 5 miles (8.0 km) south of Downham Market and 10 miles (16 km) north-east of the Cambridgeshire city of Ely. The River Great Ouse marks the western boundary of the parish, which also borders Cambridgeshire along the River Little Ouse at the hamlet of Brandon Creek.

The parish covers an area of 18.12 km^{2} (7.00 sq mi) and had a population of 1,324 at the 2011 Census. For local government purposes, it falls within the district of King's Lynn and West Norfolk. The A10 road runs through the parish.

The village's name means "southerly island".

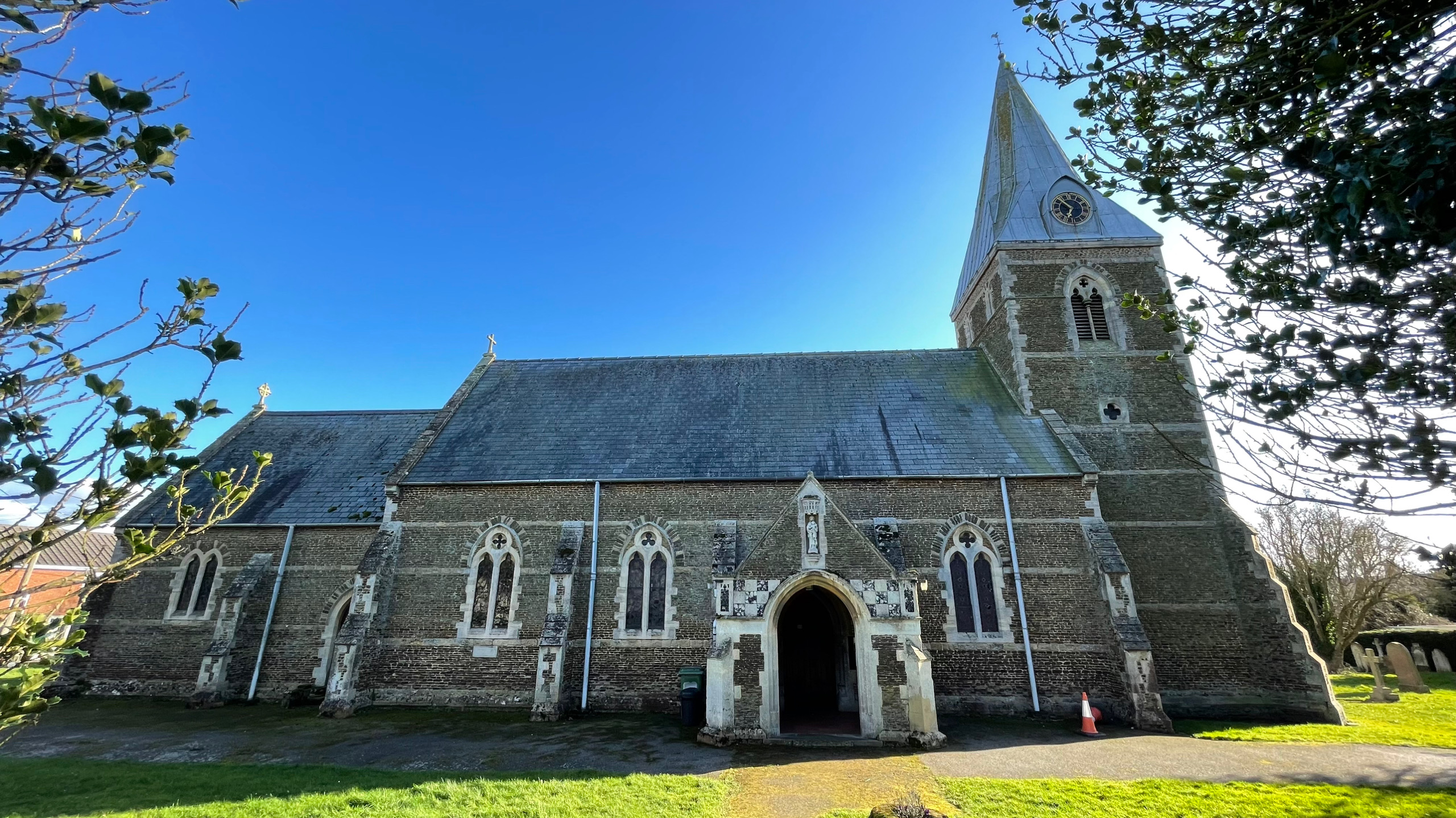
Southery, Norfolk: St Mary's church, rebuilt 1858

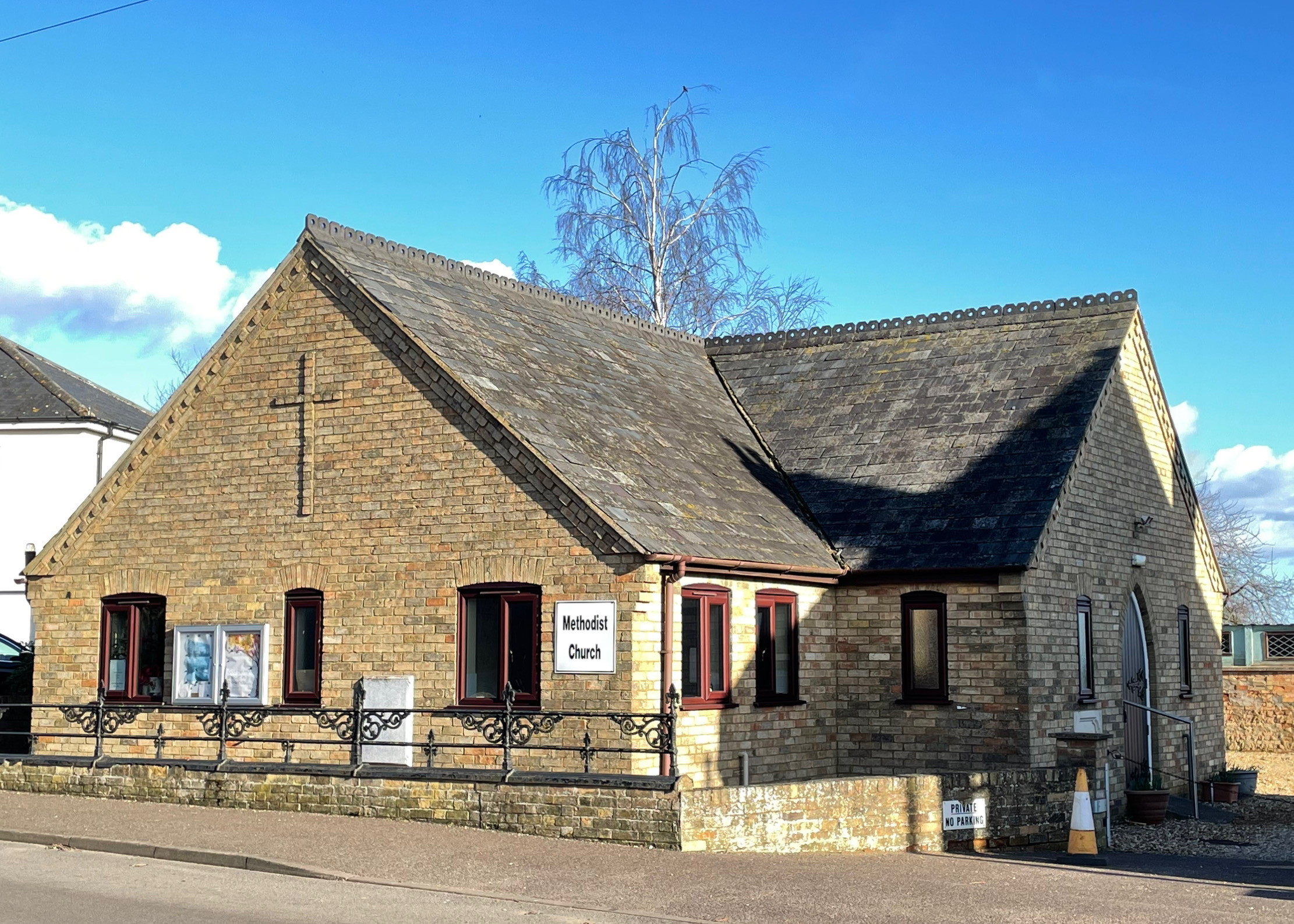
The Methodist Church in Southery, Norfolk
