= Admiral Wells (disambiguation) =

Admiral Wells is a pub in the United Kingdom. Admiral Wells may also refer to:

- David Wells (admiral) (1918–1983), Royal Australian Navy rear admiral
- John Wells (Royal Navy officer) (1763–1841), British Royal Navy admiral
- Lionel Wells (1884–1965), British Royal Navy admiral
- Richard Wells (Royal Navy officer) (1833–1896), British Royal Navy admiral
- Thomas Wells (Royal Navy officer) (1759–1811), British Royal Navy vice admiral
