= Upwood Meadows =

Nature reserve in Cambridgeshire, England

Coordinates: 52.427°N 0.162°W

- Site of Special Scientific Interest
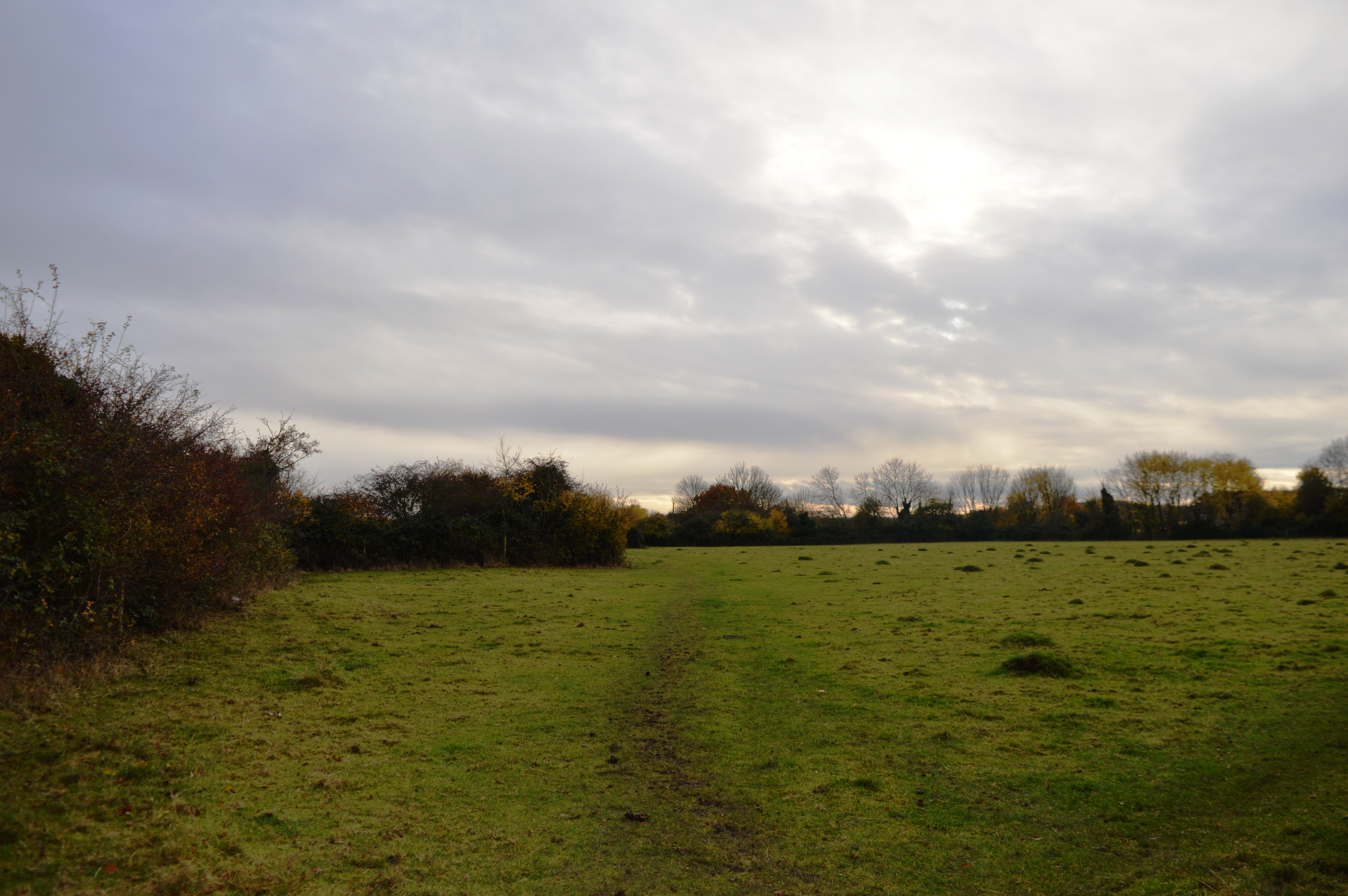
- Location of Upwood Meadows.
- Area of search: Cambridgeshire
- Grid reference: TL 251 826
- Interest: Biological
- Area: 6.0 hectares
- Notification date: 1985
- Location map: Magic Map

Upwood Meadows is a 6 hectare biological Site of Special Scientific Interest west of Upwood in Cambridgeshire. It is also a National Nature Reserve and a Grade I Nature Conservation Review site. It is managed by the Wildlife Trust for Bedfordshire, Cambridgeshire and Northamptonshire.

The site has three fields on calcareous clay with poor drainage, a type of pasture now very rare, and was described by Derek Ratcliffe as having "an outstandingly rich and diverse flora". Other habitats are mature hedgerows, ponds and scrub. One of the fields is agriculturally unimproved, and the evidence of medieval ridge and furrow still survives. Flowering plants include pepper saxifrage and green-winged orchid.

There is access by a footpath from Bentley Close in Upwood.

== See also ==
- Great Fen
- Woodwalton Fen
