= Woodwalton Fen =

Fen in Cambridgeshire, England

Coordinates: 52.445°N 0.193°W

- Site of Special Scientific Interest
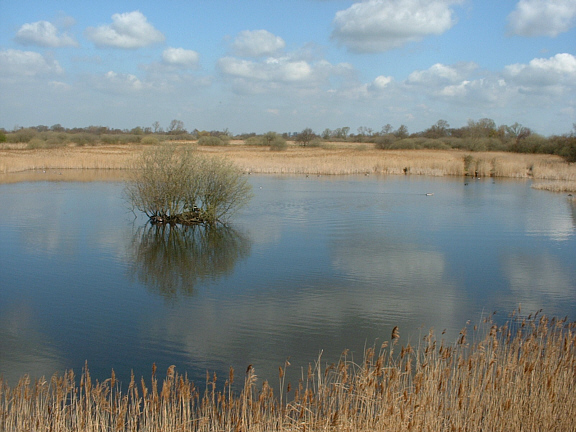
- Gordon's Mere, Woodwalton Fen
- Location of Woodwalton Fen.
- Area of search: Cambridgeshire
- Grid reference: TL 229 844
- Interest: Biological
- Area: 209 hectares
- Notification date: 1985
- Location map: Magic Map

Designations

Ramsar Wetland
- Official name: Woodwalton Fen
- Designated: 12 September 1995
- Reference no.: 753

Woodwalton Fen is a 209-hectare biological Site of Special Scientific Interest in the parish of Woodwalton, west of Ramsey in Huntingdonshire, Cambridgeshire, England. It is a Ramsar wetland site of international importance, a National Nature Reserve, a Special Area of Conservation and a Nature Conservation Review site, Grade I. The site is managed by Natural England and owned by the Wildlife Trust for Bedfordshire, Cambridgeshire and Northamptonshire.

== History ==
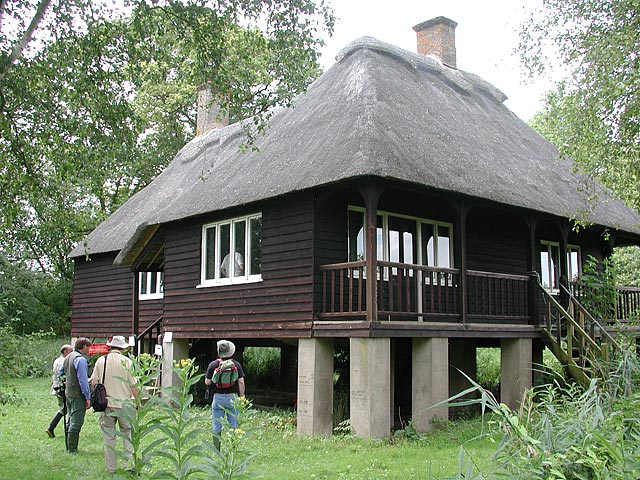
The bungalow in Woodwalton Fen, built by Charles Rothschild in 1911

One of the first nature reserves to be created in England, Woodwalton Fen was bought by the banker and entomologist Charles Rothschild in 1910. Rothschild intended to present the site to the National Trust, but they declined it, and it was kept initially as a private nature reserve. In 1911 Rothschild built a bungalow on the fen for his own use. The bungalow was rethatched in 2011.

In 2022, the Wildlife Trust for Bedfordshire, Cambridgeshire and Northamptonshire launched a crowdfunding campaign, aiming to raise £400,000 to purchase the Speechly's Farm to connect the Woodwalton Fen and the Holme Fen National Nature Reserves.

== Ecology ==
The site has one of the few remaining ranges of flora characteristic of the East Anglian Fens. There are rare fen plants such as fen wood-rush and fen violet, and ditches have uncommon aquatic plants including bladderwort and water violet.

== Threats ==
As well as being a nature reserve, Woodwalton Fen is used to store winter flood water. There are issues relating to water quality. The flood water entering Woodwalton Fen has high silt and nutrient loads.

== Relationship with other East Anglian fens ==
It is part of a Special Area of Conservation, Fenland SAC, which includes two other fragments of wild fenland in Cambridgeshire: Wicken Fen (about 38 miles from Woodwalton) and Chippenham Fen.

As part of the Great Fen Project, Woodwalton Fen is being connected to Holme Fen via habitat restoration of land which has been under arable cultivation. The Great Fen Project started with the purchase of 82 hectares of land (Darlows Farm), to the north of Woodwalton Fen in 2002. The Cambridge Geological Society designed the Fen Edge Trail that follows the five-metre contour, which 3,000 years ago was near the maritime coast of England.

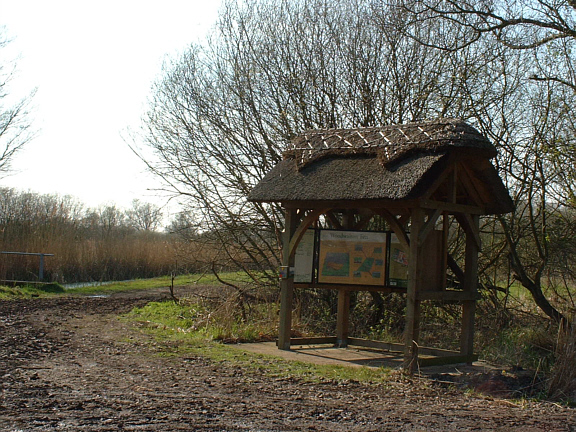
Woodwalton Fen NNR information point.

== Access ==
There is access to the reserve from Chapel Road in Ramsey Heights village.
