= Upwood =

Village in Cambridgeshire, England

Coordinates: 52.43°N 0.15°W

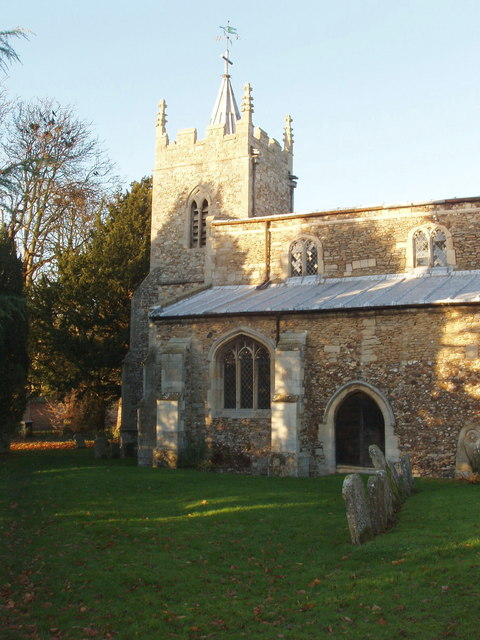
- St Peter's Church, Upwood

- Location within Cambridgeshire
- Population: 1,287 (2011)
- OS grid reference: TL257833
- Civil parish: Upwood and the Raveleys
- District: Huntingdonshire
- Shire county: Cambridgeshire
- Region: East
- Country: England
- Sovereign state: United Kingdom
- Post town: Huntingdon
- Postcode district: PE26
- Police: Cambridgeshire
- Fire: Cambridgeshire
- Ambulance: East of England
- UK Parliament: North West Cambridgeshire

Upwood is a village and former civil parish, now in the parish of Upwood and the Raveleys, in the non-metropolitan district and historic county of Huntingdonshire, England, although in the administrative county of Cambridgeshire. Upwood lies approximately 7 miles (11 km) north of Huntingdon, near Bury. In 1931 the parish had a population of 322.

The village lies along the High Street which runs parallel to the main road from Great Raveley to Ramsey about 300 yards to the west. The church stands about the middle of the village and there are several 17th-century cottages to the north and south of it.

In September 1917, the Royal Air Force started work on RAF Upwood, a large airfield near the village used by both the RAF and latterly by the United States Air Force.

Three nature reserves, Lady's Wood, Ramsey Heights and Upwood Meadows, lie near to the village; the latter is a national nature reserve.

The village has a free Book Exchange housed in a red telephone box.

== History ==
In 1085 William the Conqueror ordered that a survey should be carried out across his kingdom to discover who owned which parts and what it was worth. The survey took place in 1086 and the results were recorded in what, since the 12th century, has become known as the Domesday Book. Starting with the king himself, for each landholder within a county there is a list of their estates or manors; and, for each manor, there is a summary of the resources of the manor, the amount of annual rent that was collected by the lord of the manor both in 1066 and in 1086, together with the taxable value.

Upwood was listed in the Domesday Book in the Hundred of Hurstingstone in Huntingdonshire; the name of the settlement was written as Upehude in the Domesday Book. In 1086 there was just one manor at Upwood; the annual rent paid to the lord of the manor in 1066 had been £10 and the rent had fallen to £9 in 1086.

The Domesday Book does not explicitly detail the population of a place but it records that there were 35 households at Upwood. There is no consensus about the average size of a household at that time; estimates range from 3.5 to 5 people per household. Using these figures then an estimate of the population of Upwood in 1086 is that it was within the range of 122 and 175 people.

The Domesday Book uses a number of units of measure for areas of land that are now unfamiliar terms, such as hides and ploughlands. In different parts of the country, these were terms for the area of land that a team of eight oxen could plough in a single season and are equivalent to 120 acres (49 hectares); this was the amount of land that was considered to be sufficient to support a single family. By 1086, the hide had become a unit of tax assessment rather than an actual land area; a hide was the amount of land that could be assessed as £1 for tax purposes. The survey records that there were sixteen ploughlands at Upwood in 1086. In addition to the arable land, there was 6 acres (2 hectares) of meadows and 5.677 acres (2.297 hectares) of woodland at Upwood.

The tax assessment in the Domesday Book was known as geld or danegeld and was a type of land-tax based on the hide or ploughland. It was originally a way of collecting a tribute to pay off the Danes when they attacked England, and was only levied when necessary. Following the Norman Conquest, the geld was used to raise money for the King and to pay for continental wars; by 1130, the geld was being collected annually. Having determined the value of a manor's land and other assets, a tax of so many shillings and pence per pound of value would be levied on the land holder. While this was typically two shillings in the pound the amount did vary; for example, in 1084 it was as high as six shillings in the pound. For the manor at Upwood the total tax assessed was ten geld.

By 1086 there was a church and a priest at Upwood.

== Government ==
Upwood is part of the civil parish of Upwood and The Raveleys, which has a parish council. The parish council is elected by the residents of the parish who have registered on the electoral roll; the parish council is the lowest tier of government in England. A parish council is responsible for providing and maintaining a variety of local services including allotments and a cemetery; grass cutting and tree planting within public open spaces such as a village green or playing fields. The parish council reviews all planning applications that might affect the parish and makes recommendations to Huntingdonshire District Council, which is the local planning authority for the parish. The parish council also represents the views of the parish on issues such as local transport, policing and the environment. The parish council raises its own tax to pay for these services, known as the parish precept, which is collected as part of the Council Tax. The parish council consists of nine councillors and a parish clerk. The parish council normally meets on the first Monday of the month. The parish precept for the financial year ending 31 March 2016 was £22, 000. On 1 April 1935 the parish of Upwood was abolished to form "Upwood and the Raveleys".

Upwood was in the administrative county of Huntingdonshire until 1965. From 1965, the village was part of the new administrative county of Huntingdon and Peterborough. Then in 1974, following the Local Government Act 1972, Upwood became administered as if part of Cambridgeshire.

The second tier of local government is Huntingdonshire District Council which is a non-metropolitan district of Cambridgeshire and has its headquarters in Huntingdon. Huntingdonshire District Council has 52 councillors representing 29 district wards. Huntingdonshire District Council collects the council tax, and provides services such as building regulations, local planning, environmental health, leisure and tourism. Upwood is a part of the district ward of Upwood and The Raveleys and is represented on the district council by one councillor. District councillors serve for four-year terms following elections to Huntingdonshire District Council.

For Upwood the highest tier of local government is Cambridgeshire County Council which has administration buildings in Cambridge. The county council provides county-wide services such as major road infrastructure, fire and rescue, education, social services, libraries and heritage services. Cambridgeshire County Council consists of 69 councillors representing 60 electoral divisions. Upwood is part of the electoral division of Warboys and Upwood and is represented on the county council by one councillor.

At Westminster Upwood is in the parliamentary constituency of North West Cambridgeshire, and elects one Member of Parliament (MP) by the first past the post system of election. Upwood is represented in the House of Commons by Shailesh Vara (Conservative). Shailesh Vara has represented the constituency since 2005. The previous member of parliament was Brian Mawhinney (Conservative) who represented the constituency between 1997 and 2005.

== Demography ==
=== Population ===
In the period 1801 to 1901 the population of Upwood was recorded every ten years by the UK census. During this time the population was in the range of 316 (the lowest was in 1801) and 416 (the highest was in 1851).

From 1901, a census was taken every ten years with the exception of 1941 (due to the Second World War).

| Parish | 1911 | 1921 | 1931 | 1951 | 1961 | 1971 | 1981 | 1991 | 2001 | 2011 |
|---|---|---|---|---|---|---|---|---|---|---|
| Great Raveley | 168 | 152 | 162 | | | | | | | |
| Little Raveley | 46 | 45 | 51 | | | | | | | |
| Upwood | 376 | 339 | 322 | | | | | | | |
| Upwood and The Raveleys | 590 | 536 | 535 | 569 | 1,085 | 1,169 | 955 | 1,321 | 1,218 | 1,287 |

All population census figures from report Historic Census figures Cambridgeshire to 2011 by Cambridgeshire Insight. The parishes of Great Raveley, Little Raveley and Upwood were combined into a single parish between 1931 and 1951.

In 2011, the parish covered an area of 4,663 acres (1,887 hectares) and so the population density for Upwood and The Raveleys in 2011 was 176. 6 persons per square mile (68. 2 per square kilometre).

== Religious sites ==
The Church of St. Peter consists of a chancel (24 ft. by 15 ft.), nave (43 ft. by 16½ ft.), north chapel (11½ ft. by 12 ft.), north aisle (39½ ft. by 10½ ft.), south aisle (9 ft. wide), and west tower (7¼ ft. by 7¼ ft. The walls are of rubble with stone dressings, those of the chancel patched with brickwork, and the roofs are covered with lead.

Of the church mentioned in the Domesday Survey (1086), which was probably of timber, nothing remains, but about the year 1100 a stone church consisting of a chancel and an aisle-less nave was built, of which the chancel arch and part of the north wall of the nave remain. Some fifty years later the chancel was rebuilt and widened and an arcade cut into the nave wall and a north aisle built. The following century saw the building of the south aisle and west tower, and, apparently in connection with this work, the western arch of the north arcade was rebuilt. The south arcade, however, was rebuilt in the 15th century, and the clearstory built. The chancel walls were raised and a new roof constructed in 1642. The north aisle was rebuilt in 1884–5, and the west tower in 1890, and other works done in 1912 and 1921.

The chancel, c. 1150, has a modern east window with internal splays of the 15th century. The north wall has an original window, a blocked square-headed two-light window, a blocked door perhaps opening into a former vestry, a blocked squint, and a large blocked locker. The south wall has an original window, two 15th-century two-light windows, one with a square head and one with a four-centred arch and a transom forming a low-side window, and a 15th-century piscina. The arch, of c. 1100, has two plain orders resting on simple imposts; it is much depressed, and under it is a 15th-century oak screen. The roof, dated 1642, is of low pitch. There is an ancient gable cross, but the parapets have been rebuilt partly with brick, and have lost the fillings of their merlons.

The nave has a north arcade of three bays, the two eastern arches are semi-circular, of c. 1150, and supported on two circular columns with scalloped caps, the western arch with its respond was rebuilt in the 13th century. Above the two earlier arches are the remains of two blocked windows of c. 1100. The south arcade, also of three bays, is of the 15th century, with pointed arches and octagonal columns. The 15th-century clearstory has three two-light windows on each side. The roof is of 15th-century date, with sunk traceried panels in the braces.

The north aisle and north chapel were rebuilt in 1884–5, but incorporate a three-light window in the east wall and two others in the north wall, all of the 15th century, and a plain 14th-century north door, and the west wall has a 13th-century single-light window. In the wall between the chapel and the chancel is a recess with a blocked squint; westward of it is a modern opening for access to the pulpit. In the east wall is a reset 14th-century piscina. A simple 15th-century screen, much modernised, separates the chapel from the aisle.

The 13th-century south aisle has a 15th-century three-light window in the east wall, and the south wall has two similar windows, a 14th-century doorway and a 14th-century piscina. The west wall has a 13th-century three-light with modernised head. There is a little 15th-century glass in the heads of the east and south-east windows.

The roofs of both aisles are of the 15th century, but much restored.

The west tower was rebuilt in 1890, but the towerarch is of 13th-century date, and the belfry windows are of two lights of the same period. Parts of the parapets and pinnacles are of the 15th century. An early 14th-century niche has been rebuilt into the west wall, also a corbel of a woman's head in wimple, and a kneeling figure, both of the 13th century.

The font is a plain square bowl possibly of c. 1150, on a modern stem and base; it has a 17th-century pyramidal oak cover. There are three bells, inscribed: 1, John Gregory: Thomas: Charter: Churchward: 1709. 2, A penetente harte is goode. 3, Non Sono animabvs mortvorvm sed avribvs viventivm. 1615. (On second line) Henry Crvmwell, Armiger. The second by Newcome and the third by Norris. In 1552 it was stated that the middle bell had been sold for £7.

There are the following monuments: In the chancel, to Peter Pheasant, Justice of the King's Bench, d. 1649, and Mary (de Bruges) his wife; Mary Warner, widow, d. 1771; Sir Richard Bickerton, bart., d. 1792, and Dame Maria Anne, his widow, d. 1811; Maria Bickerton, Lady of the Manor, d. 1845, and Jane Frances Bickerton, d. 1827; and a floor slab to the Hon. Charles Montagu, youngest son of Viscount Hinchingbrooke, d. 1780; in the south aisle to Richard Ross, d. 1730; matrices of brasses of a demi-figure of a priest with inscription plate, and a figure of a woman with inscription plate and four scrolls, both 15th century; floor slabs to Reginald Michell, d. 1706, and the Rev. Robert Michell, d. 1707.

St Peter's Upwood is part of The United Benefice of the Ramseys and Upwood and the current incumbent is the Reverend Iain Osborne.
