= Ramsey Heights =

Village in Cambridgeshire, England

Coordinates: 52.4532°N 0.1577°W

- Location within Cambridgeshire
- OS grid reference: TL2585
- District: Huntingdonshire
- Shire county: Cambridgeshire
- Region: East
- Country: England
- Sovereign state: United Kingdom
- Post town: Huntingdon
- Postcode district: PE26
- Dialling code: 01487
- Police: Cambridgeshire
- Fire: Cambridgeshire
- Ambulance: East of England

Ramsey Heights is a village in Ramsey civil parish, part of the Huntingdonshire district of Cambridgeshire, England.

The Ramsey Heights nature reserve is located on the edge of the village and the larger Woodwalton Fen National Nature Reserve is 2 miles (3 km) to the southwest of the village.

Despite its name, the village is low-lying and straddles the zero-metre contour line in the flat fenland.

== History ==
On 22 November 1940, a Supermarine Spitfire, flown by Pilot Officer Harold Penketh, crashed into Holme Fen.

In October 2015, archaeological work to recover the Second World War Spitfire was undertaken. The dig's project director was Stephen Macauley of Oxford Archaeology East (OAE). A film of the dig was shown at the Great Fen's Countryside Centre, Ramsey Heights on 27 September 2019.

== Notable residents ==
- Sybil Marshall (1913–2005), writer, academic and social historian was born in the village.
