= Admiral Wells =

Historic pub in Holme, England

Coordinates: 52.4742°N 0.2390°W

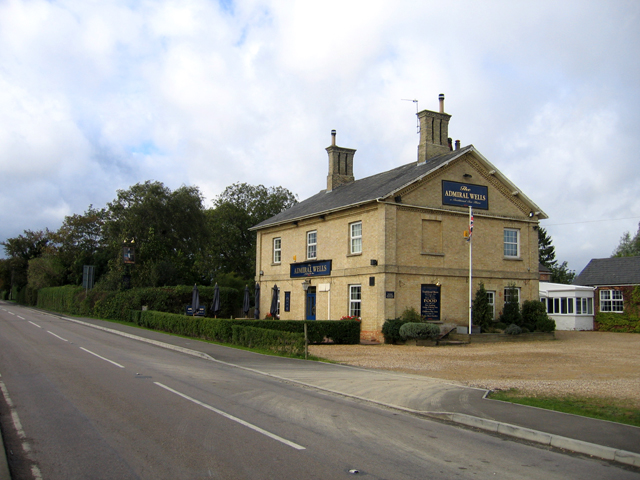
The Admiral Wells

The Admiral Wells is a public house in Holme, Huntingdonshire, now in Cambridgeshire. Nearby Holme Fen is 2.75 metres (9.0 feet) below sea level, and the Admiral Wells has been confirmed the lowest pub in Great Britain.

== History ==
In the late 1840s, William Wells, who had inherited the nearby Holmewood Hall from his father Captain William Wells, drained Whittlesey Mere. By 1852, the area was dry and available for agriculture. Using his new-found wealth, Wells built a pub on the land and named it The Admiral Wells after his grandfather, Thomas Wells.
