= Sweordora =

People of medieval England

The Sweordora were an Anglian (Note: Also known as Ingaevonic.) tribe who, according to the Tribal Hidage, (Note: Their territory was assessed for 300 hides.) lived in the vicinity of Sword Point, Whittlesey Mere, Cambridgeshire (formerly Huntingdonshire), probably in the 6th Century. (Note: Probably in response to the volcanic winter of 536 AD.) Their endonym is a clear cognate of the Suiones (also known as Swēon) the Swedes.
