= Holme Fen =

Nature reserve and lowest point in the UK

Coordinates: 52.486°N 0.224°W

- Site of Special Scientific Interest
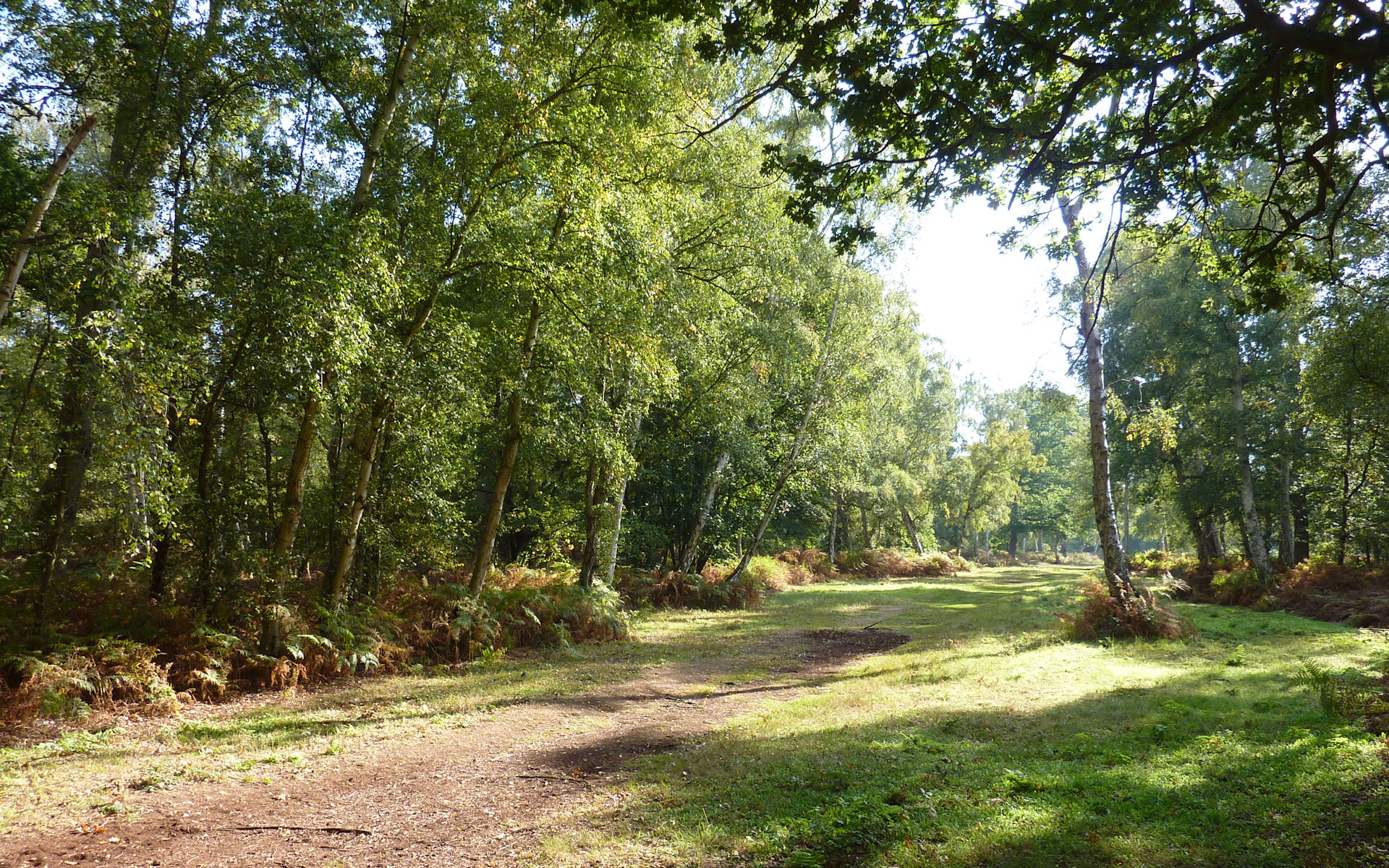
- Location of Holme Fen.
- Area of search: Huntingdonshire
- Grid reference: TL 206 889
- Interest: Biological
- Area: 269.4 hectares
- Notification date: 1985
- Location map: Magic Map

Holme Fen is a 269.4-hectare (666-acre) biological Site of Special Scientific Interest near Holme in Huntingdonshire. It is also a National Nature Reserve and a Nature Conservation Review site, Grade I. It is part of the Great Fen project, which aims to create a 3,700-hectare wetland wildlife area including Holme Fen, Woodwalton Fen, and other areas. It is home to a variety of birds, including the Eurasian siskin, nightingale, and lesser redpoll, and around 450 species of fungi.

Holme Fen is described by Natural England as the finest example of birch woodland in lowland Britain. Part of it was a mere which was drained in the nineteenth century, and some relict wetland plants survive such as saw sedge and fen wood-rush. Two new lakes have been excavated.

The site of the Holme Fen Posts (Note: Often referred to simply as Holme Post or Holme Posts.) is widely recognised as the lowest land point in the United Kingdom at 2.75 metres (9.0 ft) below sea level, following decades of peat shrinkage caused by agricultural drainage.

== History ==
Historically, the area formed part of Whittlesey Mere, the largest body of fresh water in lowland England, measuring over 6 miles (9.7 km) across. Before its drainage, the mere was a prominent site for boating, fishing, and winter ice skating, while supporting rich wetland biodiversity, including the original British population of swallowtail butterfly.

Between 1850 and 1851, the mere was drained under the direction of local landowners headed by William Wells of Holmewood Hall using steam-driven pumps, converting the wetland into agricultural ground and remnant fenland.

To measure the rate of land subsidence following drainage in 1851, local engineer John Lawrence drove an oak pile through the peat into the underlying clay layer at a site 6 miles (9.7 km) from the lake shore, setting its top flush with the ground surface. Shortly afterwards, an ornamental cast-iron column, salvaged from the Great Exhibition of 1851 at the Crystal Palace, was erected nearby to replace it. This became known as the Holme Post.

As the peat shrank and oxidised through exposure to air and cultivation, the surrounding ground level dropped dramatically. Additional replacement posts were erected in later decades to extend the monitoring scale. The posts have recorded a ground-level drop of over 4 metres (13 ft) since measurement began, establishing the site as the lowest land point in the United Kingdom at 2.75 metres (9.0 ft) below sea level, now sitting significantly below the level of the original lakebed.

=== 1940 Spitfire crash ===
On 22 November 1940, a Supermarine Spitfire from No. 266 Squadron RAF, flown by 20-year-old Pilot Officer Harold Penketh, crashed into Holme Fen following a failure during a high-altitude routine training flight. Penketh was killed when the aircraft struck the ground vertically, and his body was subsequently recovered and buried in his hometown of Brighton.

In October 2015, archaeological work to recover the Second World War Spitfire was undertaken. Led by Oxford Archaeology East's project director Stephen Macauley, the teams successfully located and excavated artefacts alongside personal items and engine components from the crash site. A film of the excavation was shown at the Great Fen's Countryside Centre, Ramsey Heights on 27 September 2019.

=== 2026 Wildfires ===
On 27 July 2026 and again on 8 August 2026, after a series of nationwide heatwaves, firefighters were called to separate wildfires at the fen. At the height of the August incident, 80 firefighters and 16 appliances attended the scene.

Fire services from around the country sent appliances and crews to assist in battling the blaze, the size of which was likened to 60 football pitches. Fire-damaged trees began to collapse, posing a significant risk to responders. Due to the deep peat content of the soil, the fire burned underground and through root structures, making the blaze extremely complex and difficult to extinguish.

== Access ==
The reserve is open to the public throughout the year. Several footpaths cross the site.

== Management ==
Holme Fen is at the south-western edge of the former Whittlesey Mere, which has been drained. The Great Fen Project aims to reconnect Holme Fen with nearby Woodwalton Fen, another vestigial fragment of wild fenland. Holme approximately marks the south-western limit of Stage 2 of the Great Fen Project.

== See also ==
- List of extreme points of the United Kingdom
- Ben Nevis – The highest point in the United Kingdom.
- The Fens – The surrounding coastal plain in eastern England.
