= Lady's Wood =

Nature reserve in Cambridgeshire, England

Coordinates: 52.427°N 0.173°W

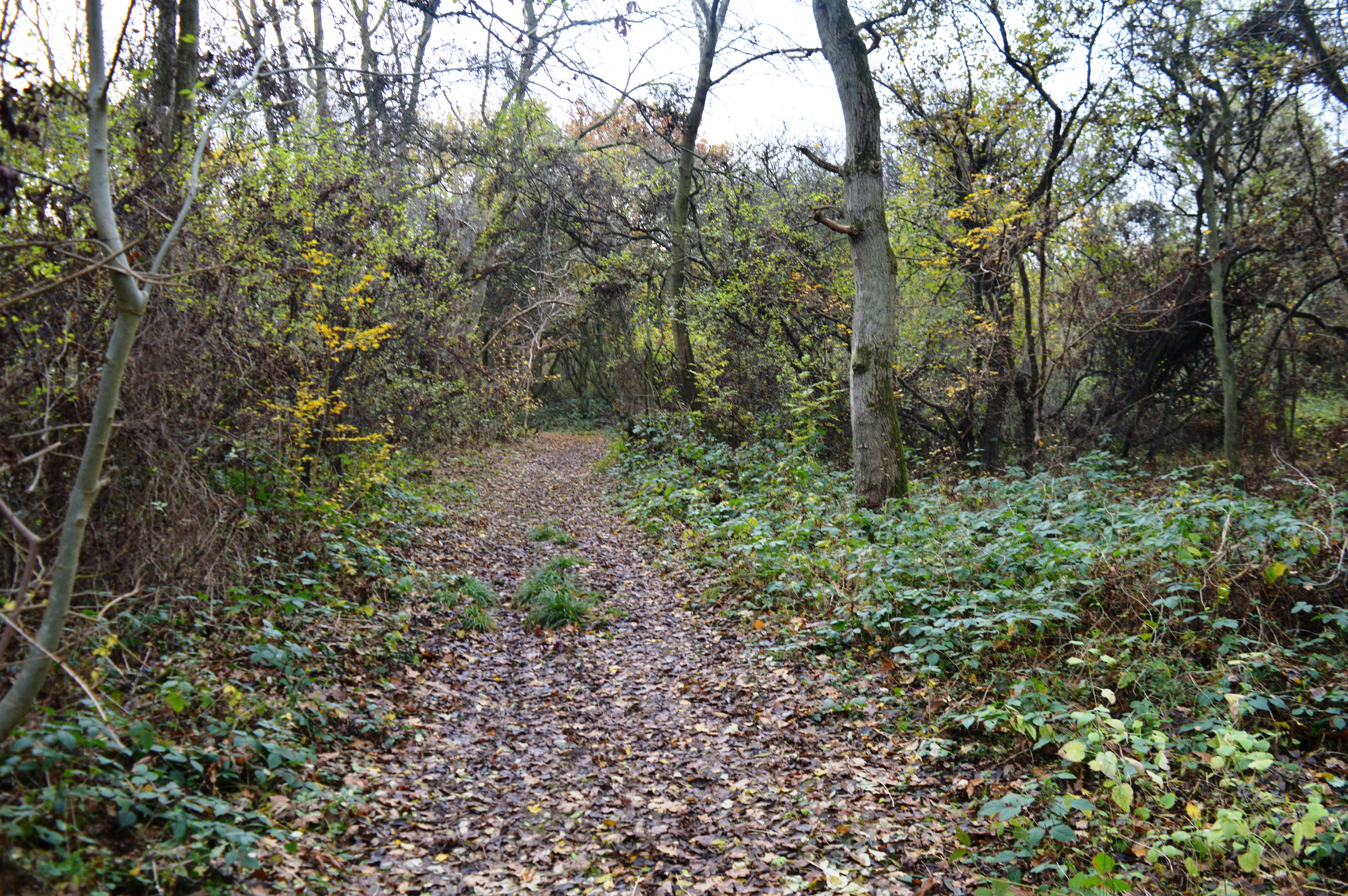
- Interactive map of Lady's Wood
- Type: Nature reserve
- Location: Upwood, Cambridgeshire
- OS grid: TL 243 826
- Area: 7.1 hectares (18 acres)
- Manager: Wildlife Trust for Bedfordshire, Cambridgeshire and Northamptonshire

Lady's Wood is a 7.1-hectare (18-acre) nature reserve west of Upwood in Cambridgeshire. It is managed by the Wildlife Trust for Bedfordshire, Cambridgeshire and Northamptonshire.

This wood was a traditional coppice, but many of the trees were cut down in the 1950s. Birds include blackcaps, fieldfares and green woodpeckers and there are invertebrates such as orange-tip butterflies and azure damselflies.

There is access by a footpath from Bentley Close in Upwood.
