= Ramsey Forty Foot =

Village in Cambridgeshire, England

Coordinates: 52.4715°N 0.0806°W

- Location within Cambridgeshire
- OS grid reference: TL3087
- District: Huntingdonshire
- Shire county: Cambridgeshire
- Region: East
- Country: England
- Sovereign state: United Kingdom
- Post town: Huntingdon
- Postcode district: PE26
- Dialling code: 01487
- Police: Cambridgeshire
- Fire: Cambridgeshire
- Ambulance: East of England

Ramsey Forty Foot is a village in Ramsey civil parish, part of the Huntingdonshire district of Cambridgeshire, England. It lies on the Forty Foot Drain. The settlement has a village hall, which also contains the village's war memorial. The memorial was previously located in a now-demolished tin tabernacle-type church dedicated to St Felix.
