= Henry Edwyn Stanhope =

Royal Navy Admiral (1754–1814)

Admiral Sir Henry Edwyn Stanhope Bt
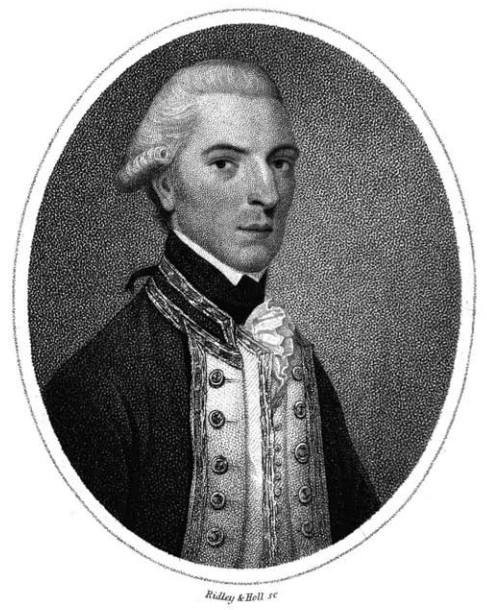
- Sir Henry Edwyn Stanhope
- Born: 1754
- Died: 20 December 1814 (aged 59–60)
- Education: Winchester College; University of Oxford
- Military career
- Allegiance: United Kingdom
- Branch: Royal Navy
- Service years: 1768–1814
- Rank: Admiral
- Commands: HMS Trepassey; HMS Salamander; HMS Terrible; HMS Russell; HMS Mercury; HMS Ruby; HMS Neptune; HMS Achille; Cornwall Sea Fencibles; Devonshire Sea Fencibles; Admiral-Superintendent Woolwich; Nore Command
- Conflicts: American Revolutionary War; Battle of Bunker Hill; Battle of Rhode Island; Battle of Saint Kitts; French Revolutionary Wars; Invasion of the Cape Colony

Admiral Sir Henry Edwyn Stanhope, 1st Baronet (1754 – 20 December 1814) was a Royal Navy officer who became Commander-in-Chief, The Nore.

== Early life ==
After initial education at a school in East Hill, Wandsworth, Henry Edwyn Stanhope was sent to Winchester College where he became head boy. Subsequent to this he was privately educated before moving on to the University of Oxford. Stanhope spent only a short period of time at Oxford, before his abilities drew the attention of William Ponsonby, 2nd Earl of Bessborough. Bessborough organised for Stanhope to join the Royal Navy, which he did in 1768.

== Naval career ==
=== Early service ===
Stanhope joined the 20-gun post ship HMS Rose at Sheerness in May. Under the command of Captain Benjamin Caldwell the ship sailed to the North America Station, subsequently arriving at Boston. There he was transferred into the 50-gun fourth-rate HMS Romney, which was the flagship of Commodore Samuel Hood. Stanhope, however, returned to Rose towards the beginning of 1769 as that ship provided him with a better chance of professional education.

Rose was subsequently sent to patrol in Massachusetts Bay on trade protection duties. On one occasion the ship stopped the brig Pitt Packet for a search, and Stanhope was sent across under Lieutenant Henry Penton. The crew of Pitt Packet believed that they were going to be pressed, and Penton was hit in the neck and killed by a harpoon. The crew were sent to the Court of Admiralty at Boston, where Stanhope was a key witness during the trial. Stanhope continued on in Rose, which then returned to England at the end of her three-year period of service.

After Rose was paid off Stanhope returned to Oxford, where he continued his degree. Intending to return to service in the Royal Navy, he also enrolled at the Royal Naval Academy in Portsmouth. At some point around this time Stanhope also served on the 74-gun ship of the line HMS Lenox, under the command of Captain Robert Roddam. His next opportunity for service came in June 1771 when he was appointed a midshipman in the 50-gun fourth-rate HMS Chatham, commanded by Captain Charles Thompson. Chatham was the flagship of Vice-Admiral William Parry, who had been appointed Commander-in-Chief, Leeward Islands Station. Chatham thus sailed to Antigua, where Stanhope was badly hit by diseases native to that climate and forced to return home for his health.

=== American Revolutionary War ===
Upon his return Stanhope did not seek to join another ship, choosing instead to complete his degree. He then took up his naval career again, being appointed to the 14-gun sloop HMS Otter March 1775. Under the command of Commander Matthew Squire Otter sailed for Boston, and Stanhope arrived before the Battle of Bunker Hill on 17 June. Having been appointed to serve as an acting lieutenant in the 20-gun post ship HMS Glasgow previously, at the battle Stanhope was given control of a group of flat-bottomed boats. Expecting the American troops to flee as soon as the British began their advance up the hill, he joined them unarmed. When the British attack came up against the American resistance that would eventually result in upwards of 1,000 casualties, Stanhope picked up a dead soldier's musket and continued forwards with the attacking marines.

In the aftermath of the battle Stanhope returned to Glasgow, which then sailed to Newport, Rhode Island. There, the ship captured an American brig which Stanhope was appointed prize master of; while sailing to Boston in the brig he then captured a large schooner. Having delivered both his prizes to Boston, Stanhope was ordered to return to Rhode Island as a passenger in a sloop. Before the sloop left port, however, he learned that several American privateers were operating nearby. Commandeering the sloop from her civilian master, Stanhope went cruising and captured two of the enemy ships. He then met with the 14-gun sloop HMS Swan, and together they completed the voyage to Rhode Island where Stanhope returned his sloop to her owners.

At Rhode Island Stanhope was transferred back to Rose, now commanded by Captain Sir James Wallace. Continuing in his acting rank, soon afterwards Stanhope cut out a schooner from Stonington harbour. Serving as ship's tender to Rose, in the schooner Stanhope escorted several prizes to Boston, re-arming his ship as he went. He was subsequently sent to Rhode Island with a load of gunpowder, and while sailing there was attacked by the 14-gun American privateer Hancock. After an hour and a half Stanhope had lost all but twelve of his crew, and retreated on to Rhode Island. There he was relieved of his command by Captain Tyringham Howe, commander of Glasgow, but Wallace overruled this and returned Stanhope to his position.

Stanhope was commanding officer of the third-rate HMS Russell at the Battle of Saint Kitts in January 1782 during the American Revolutionary War. He went on to be Second-in-Command of the fleet under Admiral Lord Gambier, with his flag in the 74-gun ship of the line HMS Pompee, at the Battle of Copenhagen during the Napoleonic Wars. He was created a baronet on 13 November 1807 and, after serving as Admiral Superintendent at Woolwich, became Commander-in-Chief, The Nore in 1810 and retired as a vice-admiral of the blue. Stanhope was promoted to admiral of the blue on 12 August 1812.

In the summer of 1809 he served on the panel of judges at the Court-martial of James, Lord Gambier which assessed whether Admiral Lord Gambier had failed to support Captain Lord Cochrane at the Battle of Basque Roads in April 1809. Gambier was controversially cleared of all charges.

== Family ==
Stanhope married Margaret Malbone, daughter of Francis Malbone Sr., of Newport, Rhode Island on 14 August 1783 at Trinity Church (Newport, Rhode Island). They had one son, Commander Edwyn Francis Scudamore Stanhope RN, 2nd Baronet (1793–1874) and two daughters.

== Sources ==
- Burke, John (1833). A General and Heraldic Dictionary of the Peerage and Baronetage of the British Empire, Volume 2. Henry Colburn.
- Clarke, James Stanier; McArthur, John (2010) [1806]. The Naval Chronicle. Vol. 15. Cambridge: Cambridge University Press. ISBN 978-1-108-01854-8.
- Ralfe, James (1820). The Naval Chronology of Great Britain; Or, An Historical Account of Naval and Maritime Events. Whitmore and Fenn.
- Syrett, David; DiNardo, R. L. (1994). The Commissioned Sea Officers of the Royal Navy. Aldershot, Hampshire: Scolar Press. ISBN 1-85928-122-2.
- Winfield, Rif (2007). British Warships in the Age of Sail 1714-1792: Design, Construction, Careers and Fates. Seaforth Publishing. ISBN 978-1844157006.

Military offices
Preceded by Thomas Wells	Commander-in-Chief, The Nore; 1810–1811	Succeeded by Sir Thomas Williams
Baronetage of the United Kingdom
New creation	Baronet (of Stanwell); 1807–1814	Succeeded by Edwin Scudamore-Stanhope
