= Ramsey Heights nature reserve =

Nature reserve in Cambridgeshire, England

Coordinates: 52.447423°N 0.168815°W

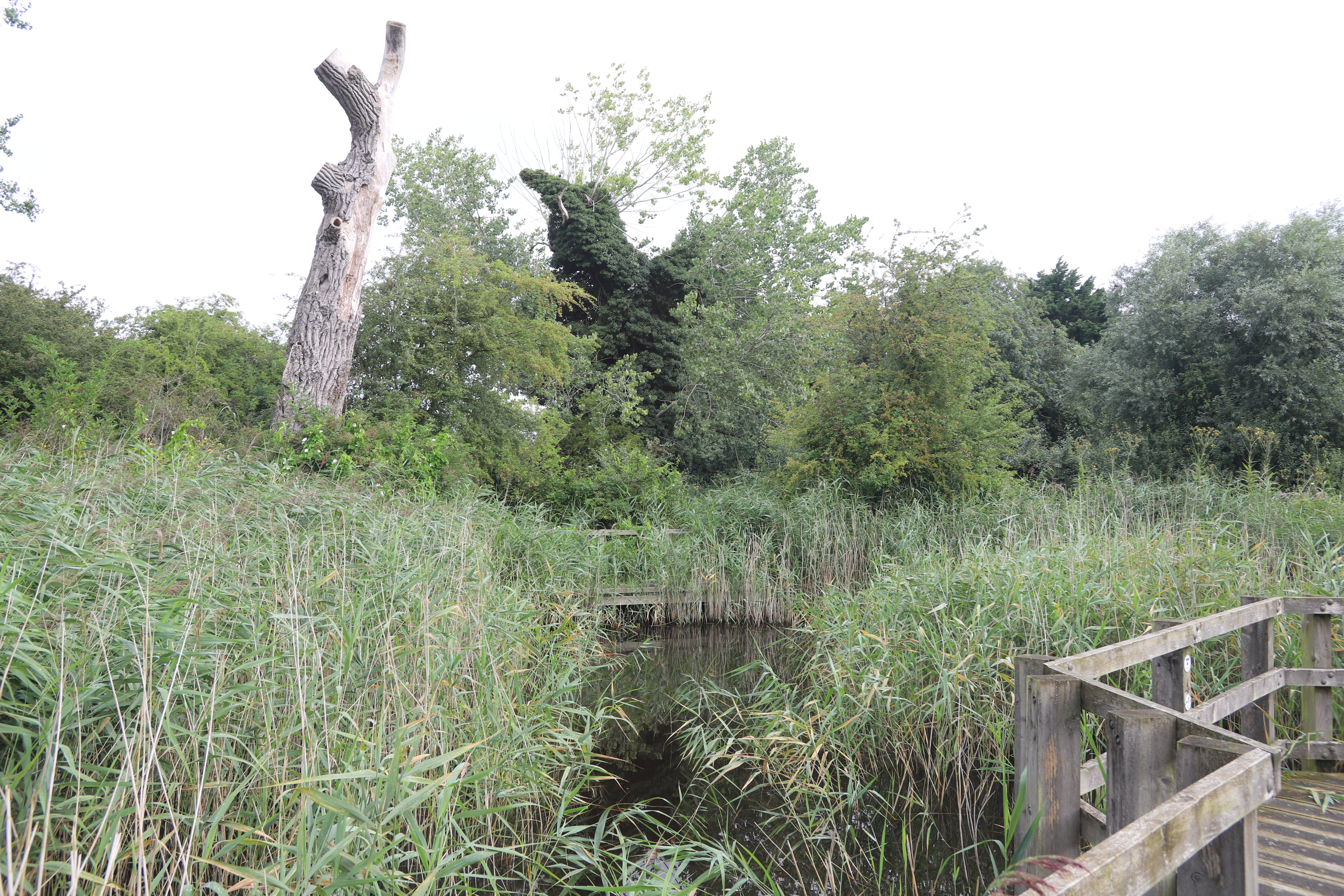
A pond in Ramsey Heights nature reserve

Ramsey Heights Nature Reserve is a small nature reserve near the village of Ramsey Heights in Cambridgeshire, England.

The reserve is 5 ha (12 acres) in extent and features ponds formed from abandoned clay pits that are rich in aquatic plant and insect life. It is managed by the Wildlife Trust for Bedfordshire, Cambridgeshire, Northamptonshire and Peterborough. The reserve is located 4 km (2.5 mi) west of the town of Ramsey and 1 km (0.6 mi) east of the larger Woodwalton Fen nature reserve.

The Wildlife Trust Countryside Centre in the reserve is based in a converted Victorian brickworks. It provides educational events for families.
