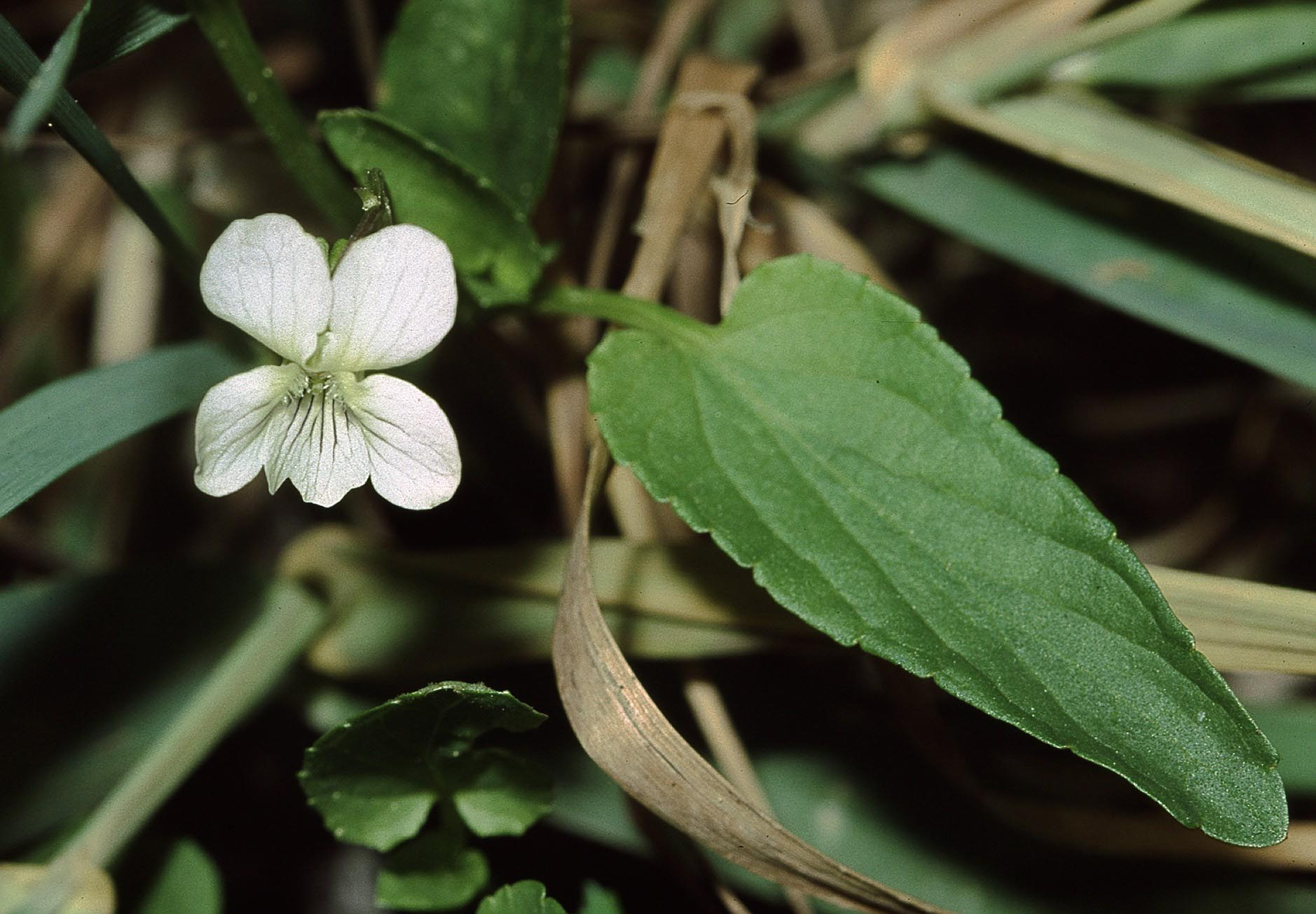

Scientific classification
- Kingdom: Plantae
- Clade: Tracheophytes
- Clade: Angiosperms
- Clade: Eudicots
- Clade: Rosids
- Order: Malpighiales
- Family: Violaceae
- Genus: Viola
- Species: V. elatior

Binomial name
- Viola elatior Fr.

Synonyms
- List: Viola canina subsp. elatior (Fr.) Wigand; Viola montana var. elatior (Fr.) Regel; Viola canina subsp. montana (L.) Hartm.; Viola canina var. montana (L.) Fr.; Viola danubialis Borbás; Viola erecta Gilib.; Viola fedtschenkoana W.Becker; Viola fedtschenkoana var. muzaffarabadensis W.Becker; Viola flavicornis var. montana (L.) Rupr.; Viola hornemanniana Schult.; Viola montana DC.; Viola montana L.; Viola persicifolia Schreb.; Viola procera Pall. ex Ledeb.; Viola pseudomontana Błocki; Viola stipulacea Hartm.; Viola subpubescens Borbás; Viola sylvestris subsp. turkestanica W.Becker

= Viola elatior =

Fen violet

Species of flowering plant

Viola elatior, the fen violet, is a species of violet native to central and northern Europe and northern Asia. In the British Isles it is very rare, occurring in a few fens in England and near the western coast of Ireland.

The violet is also known as viola persicifolia and viola stagnina.

== Description ==
Viola elatior grows to a height of 10 to 30 cm (4 to 12 in) from a creeping rhizome, with narrow, triangular leaves 7 to 15 mm (0.28 to 0.59 in) across. The flowers are produced in late spring to early summer, 10 to 15 mm (0.4 to 0.6 in) diameter, pale bluish or yellowish-white with a short, greenish or yellowish spur. The petals are rounded and broad in relation to their width.

== Distribution and habitat ==
Viola elatior occurs in native to central and northern Europe and northern Asia. Its habitat is confined to very local damp, lime-rich places, in long herbage (fens and limy marshes).

The plant is fussy about where it grows; seeds germinates in the spring on moist bare patches of base-rich peaty soil, but the seedlings only become established if the soil surface becomes drier. Most seeds germinate in close proximity to the parent plant so dispersal is limited. Habitat disturbance may cause the violet to disappear from a former habitat, but the seeds are very long-lived and new plants sometimes appear many years later.

In the British Isles, it is rare, confined to eastern and northern England and damp hollows with limestone soils in western Ireland. Efforts are being made to re-introduce it to newly suitable habitat in the Fens as part of the Great Fen Project. It occurs at a few locations in Northern Ireland, on rocky limestone lake shores around Upper Lough Erne and in turloughs or ephemeral pools around Fardrum, in County Fermanagh, and because of its rarity there, it is listed as a Northern Ireland Priority Species.
