= Fenland SAC =

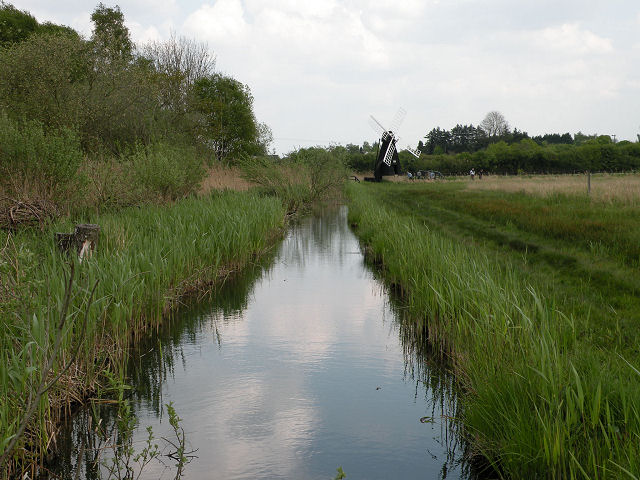
Wicken Fen

Fenland is a multi-site Special Area of Conservation in the Fens (a region in eastern England). It was designated in 2005 to protect three wetland sites in Cambridgeshire with an area of 619 ha:

- Chippenham Fen (52.298°N 0.415°E)
- Wicken Fen (52.307°N 0.278°E)
- Woodwalton Fen (52.445°N 0.193°W)

== Ecology ==
The SAC features two types of habitat which are protected under Annex One of the Habitats Directive:

- Molinia meadows on calcareous, peaty or clayey-silt-laden soils (Molinion caeruleae)
- Calcareous fens with cladium mariscus and species of the Caricion davallianae

== Management ==
The Fens were originally a much larger wetland, but they have mainly have been drained for the benefit of agriculture and today less than 1% of the original undrained wetland habitat remains. As a remnant wetland in a modified landscape, Wicken Fen in particular needs active management to maintain water levels. Because of shrinkage of the surrounding arable land, water tends to drain out of Wicken Fen. Measures have been taken to prevent drying out, including pumping water up from a drainage channel.

== Other levels of protection ==
As is normal for SACs in Great Britain, the three sites are protected as Sites of Special Scientific Interest. The sites are also protected under the Ramsar Convention.
