= Sybil Marshall =

Sybil Marshall on her wedding day in 1995 aged 82

Sybil Marshall (26 November 1913 – 29 August 2005) was a British writer, novelist, social historian, broadcaster, folklorist and educationalist.

== Biography ==
Born as Sybil Mary Edwards in Ramsey Heights, the daughter of a smallholder on the Fens who had left school at the age of nine, she was educated at Ramsey Heights Elementary School (1919–1923) and Ramsey Grammar School in Cambridgeshire (1924–1932). Marshall was not able to attend university because no scholarship was available so she started work in 1933 as an untrained teacher, first in Essex and then in Huntingdon. As an unqualified teacher at Kingston Primary School in Cambridgeshire from 1942 to 1948 she worked on her own in one room containing 26 pupils aged between 4 and 11. Here Marshall developed teaching methods based on integrating subjects and encouraging children's creativity. Later written up as An Experiment in Education, her methods influenced the 1967 Plowden Report into primary education in Britain. She attended Exhall Grange Emergency Training College in Coventry from 1948 to 1949, before going to Kingston County School in Cambridgeshire as Headteacher.

When this school closed because it was too small she went to New Hall, Cambridge in 1960 aged 48 to read English. She completed the three-year degree course in two years. She was lecturer in primary education at the University of Sheffield from 1962 to 1967 and was an educational adviser to Granada Television for the series Picture Box from 1965 to 1978. She was Reader in Primary Education at the University of Sussex from 1967 until her retirement in 1976.

== Later years ==
On retiring Marshall began a new career as a writer of fiction, writing her first novel at the age of 80 after a 10-year battle with cancer. Her trilogy – A Nest of Magpies (1993), Sharp Through The Hawthorn (1994) and Strip The Willow (1996) – are semi-autobiographical. She also published academic works on education and her childhood memoirs of growing up in the Cambridgeshire fenland. She was Sue Lawley's castaway on Desert Island Discs in 1993 and was a winner of the Angel Prize for Literature for her Everyman's Book of English Folk Tales (1981). In 1995 she was awarded an honorary Doctor of Letters degree by the University of Sussex.

== Personal life ==
In 1939 she married Francis Marshall, a local farmer. She gave birth to a still-born son in 1940 and in 1941 had her daughter Prue, who later also became a headmistress. Frank Marshall found it hard to handle such an independently minded wife and left her for another woman. They divorced in 1948. In 1963 Marshall met the historian and illustrator Ewart Oakeshott at a dance. He left his wife for her and they became partners for life - although they only married in 1995, after the death of Oakeshott's first wife, by which time Marshall was 82.

Oakeshott predeceased her.

== Bibliography ==
- Fenland Chronicle (1963)
- An Experiment in Education, Cambridge University Press (1963)
- Adventure in Creative Education
- Once Upon A Village (1979)
- The Silver New Nothing (1987)
- A Pride of Tigers (1992)
- Everyman's Book of English Folk Tales
- A Nest of Magpies (1993)
- Sharp Through The Hawthorn (1994)
- The Chequer-Board (1995)

Ring the Bell Backwards (1999)
