= Chippenham Fen and Snailwell Poor's Fen =

Protected area in Cambridgeshire, England

Coordinates: 52.298°N 0.415°E

- Site of Special Scientific Interest
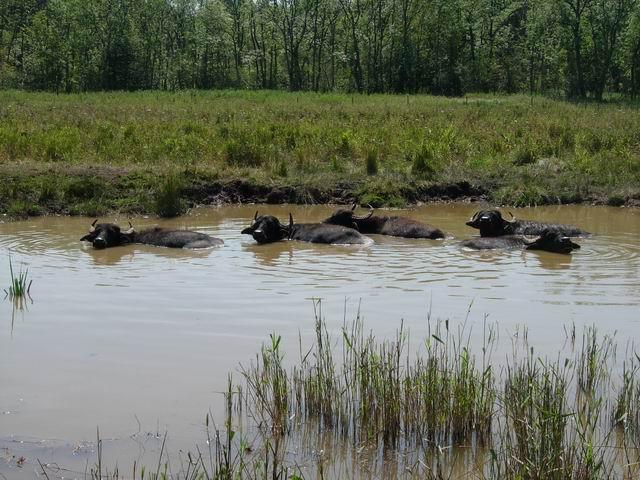
- Water buffaloes in Chippenham Fen
- Location of Chippenham Fen and Snailwell Poor's Fen.
- Area of search: Cambridgeshire
- Grid reference: TL 648 694
- Interest: Biological
- Area: 155.9 hectares
- Notification date: 1988
- Location map: Magic Map

Designations

Ramsar Wetland
- Official name: Chippenham Fen
- Designated: 11 March 1992
- Reference no.: 544

Chippenham Fen and Snailwell Poor's Fen is a 155.9-hectare (385-acre) biological Site of Special Scientific Interest south-east of Fordham in Cambridgeshire, England. It is a Nature Conservation Review site, Grade I, a Ramsar wetland site and a Special Area of Conservation (part of the multi-site Fenland SAC). It is managed by Natural England.

The site is described by Natural England as "of national importance for its wide range of wetland habitats and associated birds and insects". It has diverse habitats and flora, with several uncommon species in damp meadows. It also has many species of breeding birds, and rare spiders and moths.

Access is by permit, which is only available for people conducting research on the site.
