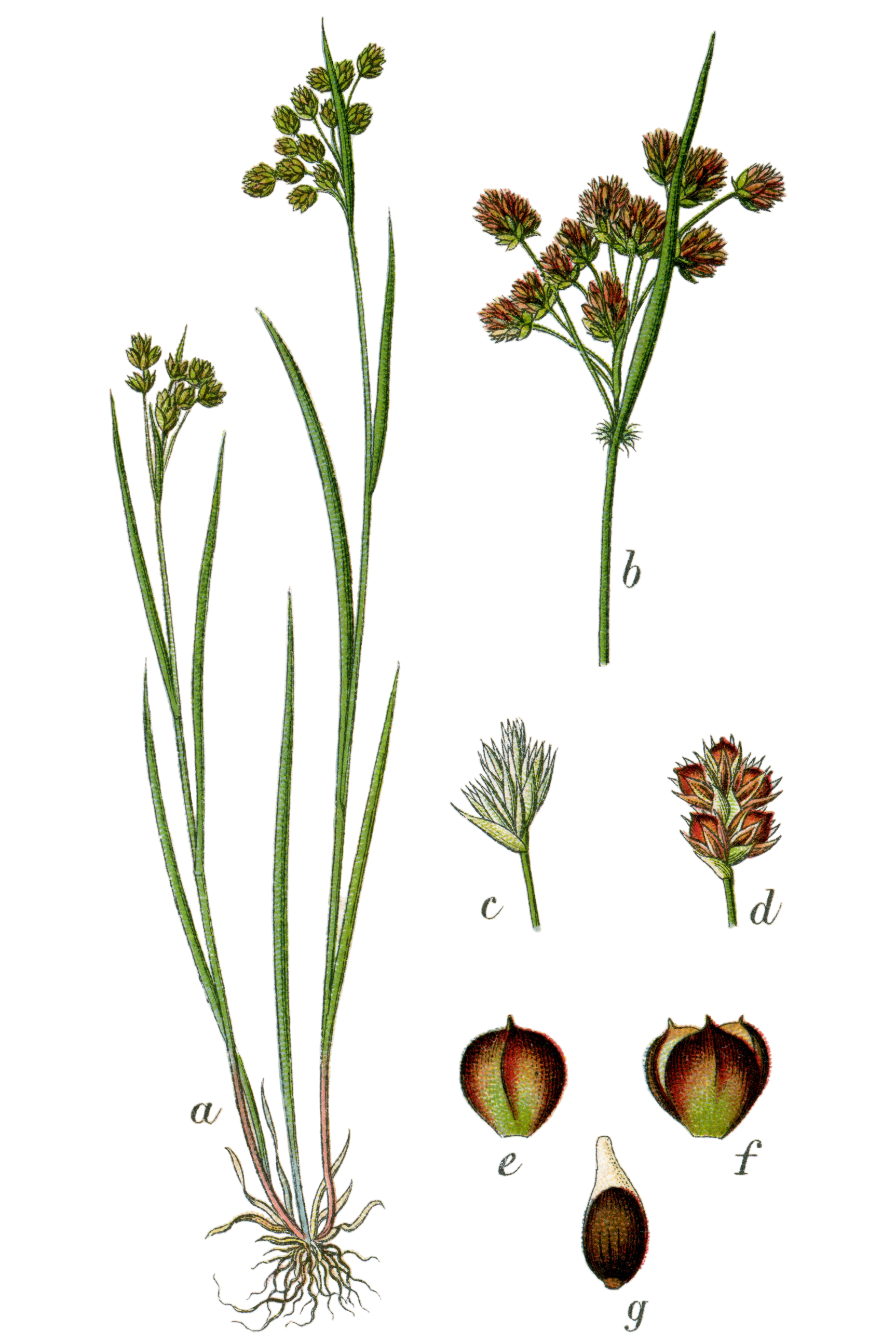

Scientific classification
- Kingdom: Plantae
- Clade: Tracheophytes
- Clade: Angiosperms
- Clade: Monocots
- Clade: Commelinids
- Order: Poales
- Family: Juncaceae
- Genus: Luzula
- Species: L. pallescens

Binomial name
- Luzula pallescens Swartz

Synonyms
- Luzula pallidula Kirschner

= Luzula pallescens =

Species of flowering plant in the rush family

Luzula pallescens is a species of perennial plant in Juncaceae family, commonly known as fen wood-rush.

== Distribution ==
The plant is widely distributed in northern Eurasia, from Great Britain and Scandinavia, through north−Central and Eastern Europe, Eurasia, and Central Asia, to the Himalayas and Northeast Asia.

In China, it can be found on elevation of 1,100–3,600 metres (3,600–11,800 ft), in such provinces as Heilongjiang, Jilin, Liaoning, Shanxi, Sichuan, and Xinjiang. Other countries it is common in include Japan, Finland, Korea, Poland, Russia, Taiwan, and Ukraine.

== Description ==
Luzula pallescens is 9–15 centimetres (3.5–5.9 in) tall with its basal leaves being of 2–3 centimetres (0.79–1.18 in) wide. It cauline leaves are 3.0–5.5 centimetres (1.2–2.2 in) tall and 2–5 millimetres (0.079–0.197 in) wide.

The length of the lower bract is 3–4 centimetres (1.2–1.6 in), while its peduncles are 2.0–5.5 centimetres (0.79–2.17 in) in length.
