= Thomas Wells (Royal Navy officer) =

British Royal Navy officer

Vice-Admiral Thomas Wells
- Born: 1759
- Died: 31 October 1811 (aged 51–52)
- Military career
- Allegiance: United Kingdom
- Branch: Royal Navy
- Rank: Vice-Admiral
- Commands: HMS Melampus; HMS Defence; HMS Glory; Nore Command
- Conflicts: French Revolutionary Wars

Vice-Admiral Thomas Wells (1759 – 31 October 1811) was a Royal Navy officer who became Commander-in-Chief, The Nore.

== Naval career ==
Wells joined the Royal Navy in 1774. He became commanding officer of the frigate HMS Melampus in early 1794 during the French Revolutionary Wars. During this time Melampus participated in the action of 23 April 1794, during which the British took three vessels, Engageante, Pomone, and Babet. Melampus had five men killed and five wounded. He went on to be commanding officer of the third-rate HMS Defence later in 1794 and commanding officer of the second-rate HMS Glory in 1799. He acted as a pallbearer at the funeral of Lord Nelson in October 1805. After that he became Commander-in-Chief, The Nore in 1807 and was promoted to Vice Admiral of the Red in 1808.

== See also ==
- Admiral Wells – pub in Holme

== Sources ==
- Winfield, Rif (2007). British Warships in the Age of Sail 1714-1792: Design, Construction, Careers and Fates. Seaforth Publishing. ISBN 978-1844157006.

Military offices
Preceded by Lord Keith	Commander-in-Chief, The Nore; 1807–1810	Succeeded by Sir Henry Stanhope
