= Ramsey, Cambridgeshire =

Market town in Cambridgeshire, England

Coordinates: 52.45°N 0.12°W

Ramsey
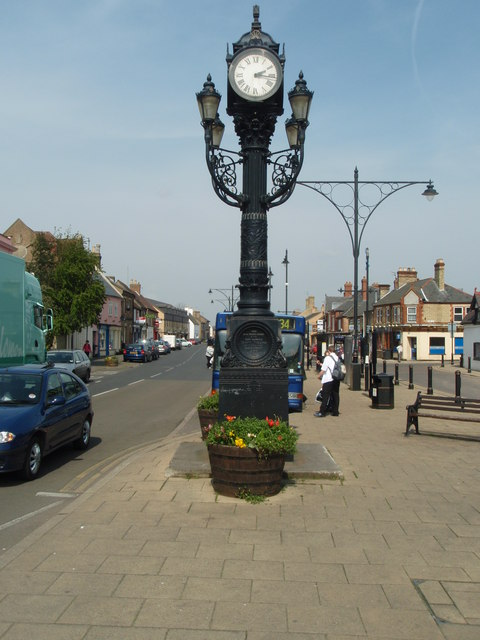
- Clock on Great Whyte

- Location within Cambridgeshire
- Population: 8,593 (Parish, 2021); 5,726 (Built up area, 2021)
- OS grid reference: TL2885
- District: Huntingdonshire
- Shire county: Cambridgeshire
- Region: East
- Country: England
- Sovereign state: United Kingdom
- Post town: HUNTINGDON
- Postcode district: PE26
- Dialling code: 01487
- Police: Cambridgeshire
- Fire: Cambridgeshire
- Ambulance: East of England
- UK Parliament: North West Cambridgeshire
- Website: ramsey-town.co.uk

Ramsey is a market town and civil parish in the Huntingdonshire district of Cambridgeshire, England. The town is about 9 miles (14 km) north of Huntingdon. Ramsey parish includes the settlements of Ramsey Forty Foot, Ramsey Heights, Ramsey Mereside, Ramsey Hollow and Ramsey St Mary's.

The town grew up around Ramsey Abbey, an important Benedictine monastery. In the order of precedence for abbots in Parliament, Ramsey was third after Glastonbury and St Albans. The town manor is built on the site of (and using materials from) the ancient Abbey and is the seat of the Lords de Ramsey, major landowners in Lincolnshire and Cambridgeshire. The remains of the Abbey are now home to part of the town's secondary school. Abbey College, Ramsey resulted from the amalgamation of the previous two secondary schools, Ailwyn School and Ramsey Abbey School.

== Abbey ==
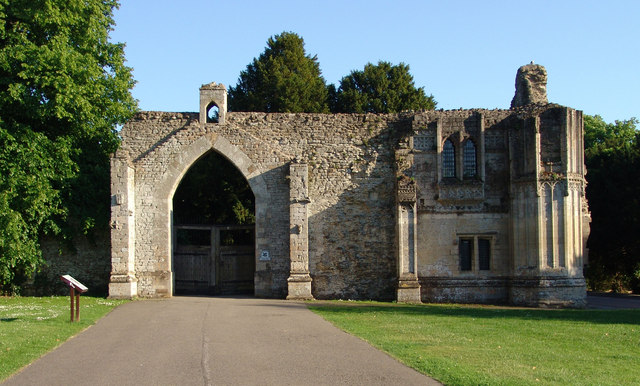
Ramsey Abbey Gatehouse

For the later Anglo-Saxon period, documentary evidence for the foundation of the 10th-century Benedictine abbey at Ramsey has been recently substantiated by the archaeological evidence for activity associated with the pre-Conquest monastery. Tradition has it that Ailwyn, foster brother of King Edgar, founded a hermitage at Ramsey. It received a series of substantial grants of land by King Edgar who confirmed all the privileges in 975, including the banlieue.

The abbey experienced the transition to Norman rule without difficulty and in the 11th century, it underwent a period of rebuilding. In the civil war between King Stephen and Empress Matilda the monastery was badly damaged and impoverished. Geoffrey de Mandeville expelled the monks in 1143 and used the buildings as a fortress. However, in the 13th and 14th centuries the house had a succession of wealthy abbots who undertook a series of costly building programmes. The Black Death brought prosperity to a temporary halt, and by the end of the 14th century, the house was financially decayed. The abbey recovered and continued to thrive until its dissolution in 1537.

At the dissolution the Crown granted the site of the monastery, its land and associated granges at Bodsey and Biggin to Richard Williams (alias Cromwell) who demolished the buildings and sold the materials. The properties remained with the Williams/Cromwell family until 1676.

== History ==
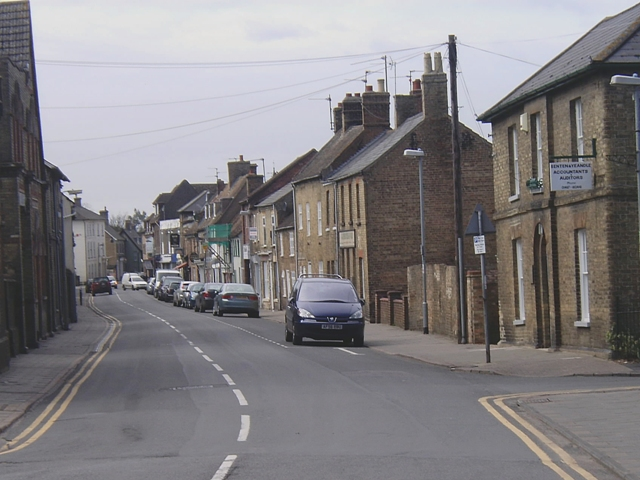
Part of the High Street

Besides a Palaeolithic axe discovered in Victoria Road and seen as a chance glacial find, there is no record of prehistoric finds from the town. Roman remains are limited to stray finds of pottery. Early and Middle Saxon Ramsey remains elusive.

The name Ramsey derives from the Old English hramsaēg meaning 'wild garlic island'.

The early history of the town is obscure. The Domesday Book of 1086 does not mention Ramsey. This may be either because it was part of Bury or because it belonged to the abbey that, at that time, enjoyed royal privileges.

Throughout the Middle Ages Ramsey remained a small market town serving the abbey and never developed into a borough. The original settlement probably developed outside the abbey, along Hollow Lane. By 1200 the town had grown enough to be granted a weekly market held at the junction of High Street with the Great Whyte and, later, an annual fair held at the green by the church. During the Middle Ages, the Great Whyte was a navigable canal that ran along what is now the road. It was culverted by 1854 with a brick tunnel, giving the town its characteristic wide main street.

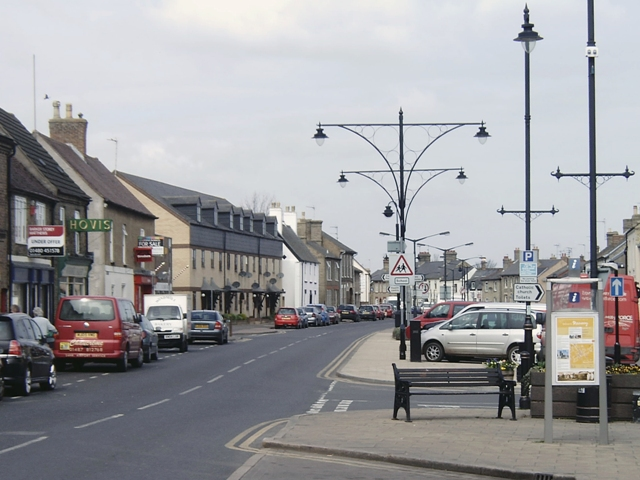
Part of Great Whyte

Properties along Great Whyte appear to represent the secondary (post-Mediæval) development of the town. Archaeological excavations have shown that this area was wet during the mediæval period due to the presence of the fen. A fire occurred at Little Whyte in 1636 which destroyed some 15 tenements. A second fire in 1731 destroyed a great part of the High Street. In 1774 Lord Orford visited Ramsey during his voyage around the Fens.

By the time of the estate map, the village had expanded along the Great Whyte and along the western end of the High Street by progressive infilling of plots. Later editions of the OS Maps up to the 1970s present a similar picture. Since the 1970s progressive increase in the size of the population has prompted development around the town and along Bury Road. The limits of the town of Ramsey and the village of Bury to the south are not clearly defined, with modern housing estates spreading across the urban boundary.

The mediæval economy was dominated by garden produce, cloth trade and alehouse keeping. Fisheries also played an important part in the fen economy, along with livestock. Throughout the Middle Ages, the waterways of the fenland formed commercial transport routes that ran through the heart of the region. Enclosure of land was piecemeal and prompted by the abbey.

After the dispersal of the estates of the abbey into lay hands in the second half of the 16th century, enclosure at Ramsey and neighbouring parishes gathered momentum. Systematic drainage of the Great Level from the 17th century increased the area for hay and pasture which was progressively divided and allotted. The remaining common lands were enclosed by Act of Parliament in 1801.

On the evening of 31 January 1941, the German spy Josef Jakobs parachuted into the Ramsey area, landing near Dovehouse Farm. Jakobs broke his ankle during his descent and was unable to move from his landing site. The next morning at around 8:30 a.m. Jakobs fired his pistol into the air to attract attention. Two local farmers (Charles Baldock and Harry Coulson) were passing by, heard the shots, and found Jakobs lying on the ground under his camouflage parachute. The farmers summoned the local Home Guard, who took charge of Jakobs. The German spy was caught wearing his flying suit and carrying British currency, forged papers, a radio, and a German sausage. Jakobs became the last person to be executed at the Tower of London.

== Governance ==
As a civil parish, Ramsey has a town council. It is elected by eligible residents of the parish who have registered on the electoral roll. The town council has 17 elected councillors and a parish clerk. In 2011 Ramsey became the first town council in the UK to be controlled by the UK Independence Party, In the 2015 election UKIP lost overall control of the council to independent councillors.

Ramsey was in the historic and administrative county of Huntingdonshire until 1965. From 1965 the town was part of the new administrative county of Huntingdon and Peterborough. Then in 1974, as a result of the Local Government Act 1972, Ramsey was made part of the county of Cambridgeshire.

The second tier of local government is Huntingdonshire District Council which is a non-metropolitan district of Cambridgeshire and has its headquarters in Huntingdon. Ramsey forms one of District Council's 29 district wards and elects three of its 52 councillors. District councillors serve for four year terms following elections to Huntingdonshire District Council.

For Ramsey the highest tier of local government is Cambridgeshire County Council. Ramsey is an electoral division and is represented on the county council by one councillor.

Ramsey is in the parliamentary constituency of North West Cambridgeshire.

== Demography ==
=== Population ===
From 1801 to 1901 the population of Ramsey was recorded every ten years in the United Kingdom Census. In that time the population ranged between 1,894 (in 1801) and 4,823 (in 1901).

From 1901 a census was taken every ten years, with the exception of 1941 due to the Second World War.

Parish	1911	1921	1931	1951	1961	1971	1981	1991	2001	2011	2021
Ramsey	5,328	5,135	5,180	5,770	5,697	5,646	5,858	6,947	8,047	8,479	8,593
All population census figures from the report Historic Census figures Cambridgeshire to 2021.

In 2011, the parish covered an area of 15,718 acres (6,361 hectares) and the population density of Ramsey was 345.2 persons per square mile (133.3 per square kilometre).

== Economy ==
A weekly market was probably held by 1200. The grant was confirmed by Henry III in 1267 who also granted a fair on the vigil and feast of the Translation of St Benedict and for two days following. The bulk of the trade was dominated by garden produce.

Fisheries also played an important part in the fen economy. The abbey cartulary contains references to detailed arrangements concerning the granting of fisheries and fishing rights around Ramsey Mere and Whittlesey Mere, with rents being often paid in eels.

Livestock and in particular cattle was also an important element of the local economy. Portions of fen were reclaimed for both arable and pasture throughout the Middle Ages and later periods. Meadow and pasture were regulated by common rights. There are accounts of disputes between the major abbeys of Ramsey, Thorney and Ely about profits and limits of their commons.

Among the occupations there were weavers and fullers with others who were connected with the cloth trade. There were also tanners. The most prosperous trade was that of alehouse keeping which suggests that Ramsey had facilities for travellers. The market had lost its prominence in the 18th century to St Ives, and by 1881 'St Ives has drained our market of cattle, and only a few pigs are now its staple', and survived as a pleasure market selling trinkets.

There is a Post Office in Ramsey.

In the 19th century, Ramsey had its own gas company, run by Edmund Broadberry, one of the Broadberry dynasty of gas engineers.

Abbey Renewables erected a 225 kW wind turbine at Ramsey in 1993, one of the first in the UK. It was replaced with a 1.8 MW turbine in 2008. In 2011, Abbey applied to Huntingdonshire District Council for permission to add a further four turbines to create a five-turbine wind farm capable of powering more than 5,000 homes.

== Transport ==
Ramsey is served by local buses, having regular and direct routes to St Ives, Huntingdon and Peterborough as well as from nearby villages.

There is no longer a railway station at Ramsey. From 1863 a Great Northern Railway branch line linked a terminus in Ramsey with the East Coast Main Line. The London and North Eastern Railway (LNER) ended passenger services on the line in 1947. British Railways ended freight services and closed the branch line in 1973. From 1889 a Great Northern and Great Eastern Joint Railway branch line also terminated in Ramsey, providing the town with a second railway terminus. The LNER closed the station and the branch line in 1930.

== Culture and community ==
Ramsey Rural Museum is in 17th-century farm buildings on Wood Lane. It is a small museum dedicated to the history of rural Fenland life.

Original historical documents relating to Ramsey, including the original church parish registers, local government records, maps, photographs, and records of Ramsey manor (held by the Fellowes family, Lords de Ramsey), are held by Cambridgeshire Archives and Local Studies at the County Record Office in Huntingdon.

== Media ==
Local news and television programmes are provided by BBC East and ITV Anglia. Television signals are received from the Sandy Heath TV transmitter. Local radio stations are BBC Radio Cambridgeshire, Heart East, Greatest Hits Radio East, Star Radio and HCR FM, a community based radio station. The Hunts Post is the town's local weekly newspaper.

== Events ==
The custom of ringing a pancake bell on Pancake Day was revived in 1891.

Every year, over the August Bank Holiday weekend, the town is home to 1940s Ramsey, a living history event.

== Churches ==
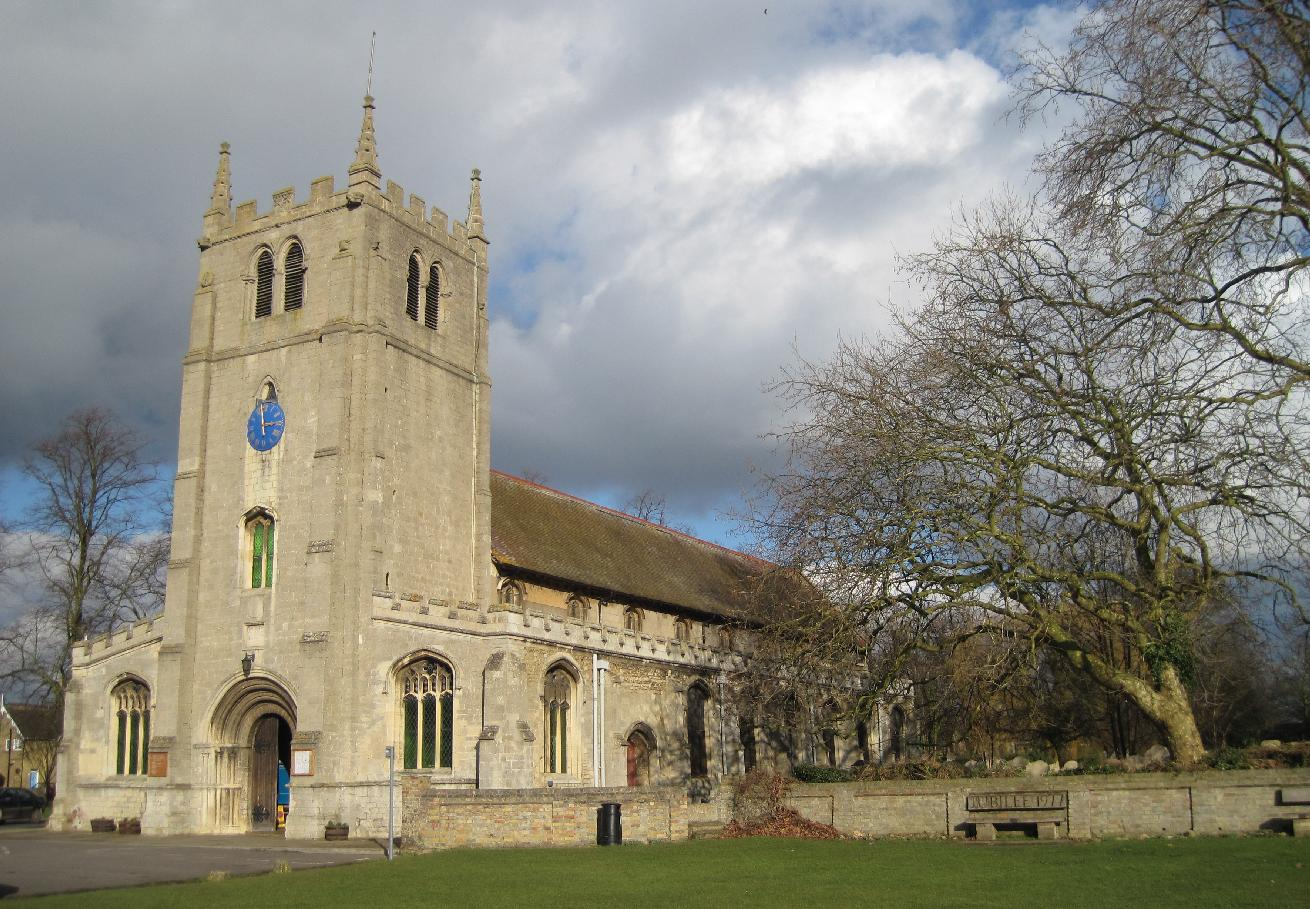
St Thomas à Becket parish church

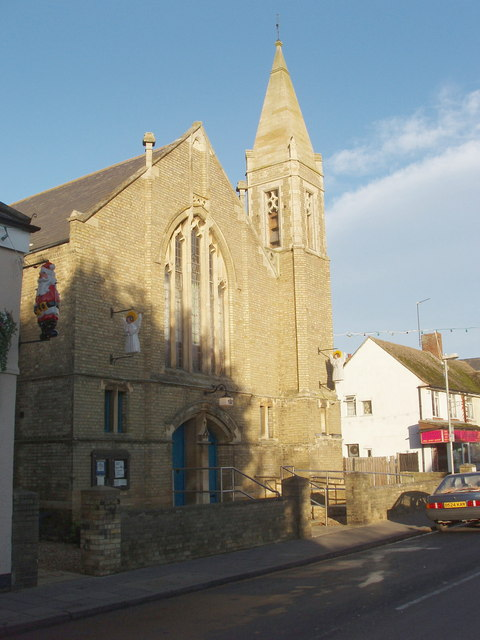
Ramsey Methodist Church in High Street

=== Church of England ===
The Church of England parish church of St Thomas à Becket was built late in the 12th century as part of Ramsey Abbey, possibly the hospitium. It was converted into a parish church early in the 13th century. The church was remodelled in the 14th and 16th centuries, and the west tower was built in 1672. The church is a Grade I listed building.

=== Salem Baptist Church ===
Salem Baptist Church was built in High Street in 1857.

=== Great Whyte Baptist Church ===
Great Whyte Baptist Church was built in 1894.

=== Ramsey Methodist Church ===
Ramsey Methodist Church in High Street is a Gothic Revival building completed in 1899.

== Sport and recreation ==
Ramsey has a King George's Field in memory of King George V. The local football club, Ramsey Town F.C., plays in the Peterborough and District Football League.

== See also ==
- Ramsey Heights nature reserve

== Sources ==
- Pevsner, Nikolaus (1968). Bedfordshire and the County of Huntingdon and Peterborough. The Buildings of England. Harmondsworth: Penguin Books. pp. 330–335. ISBN 0-14-0710-34-5.
