= Whittlesey Mere =

Former lake in England

Coordinates: 52.4996°N 0.2007°W

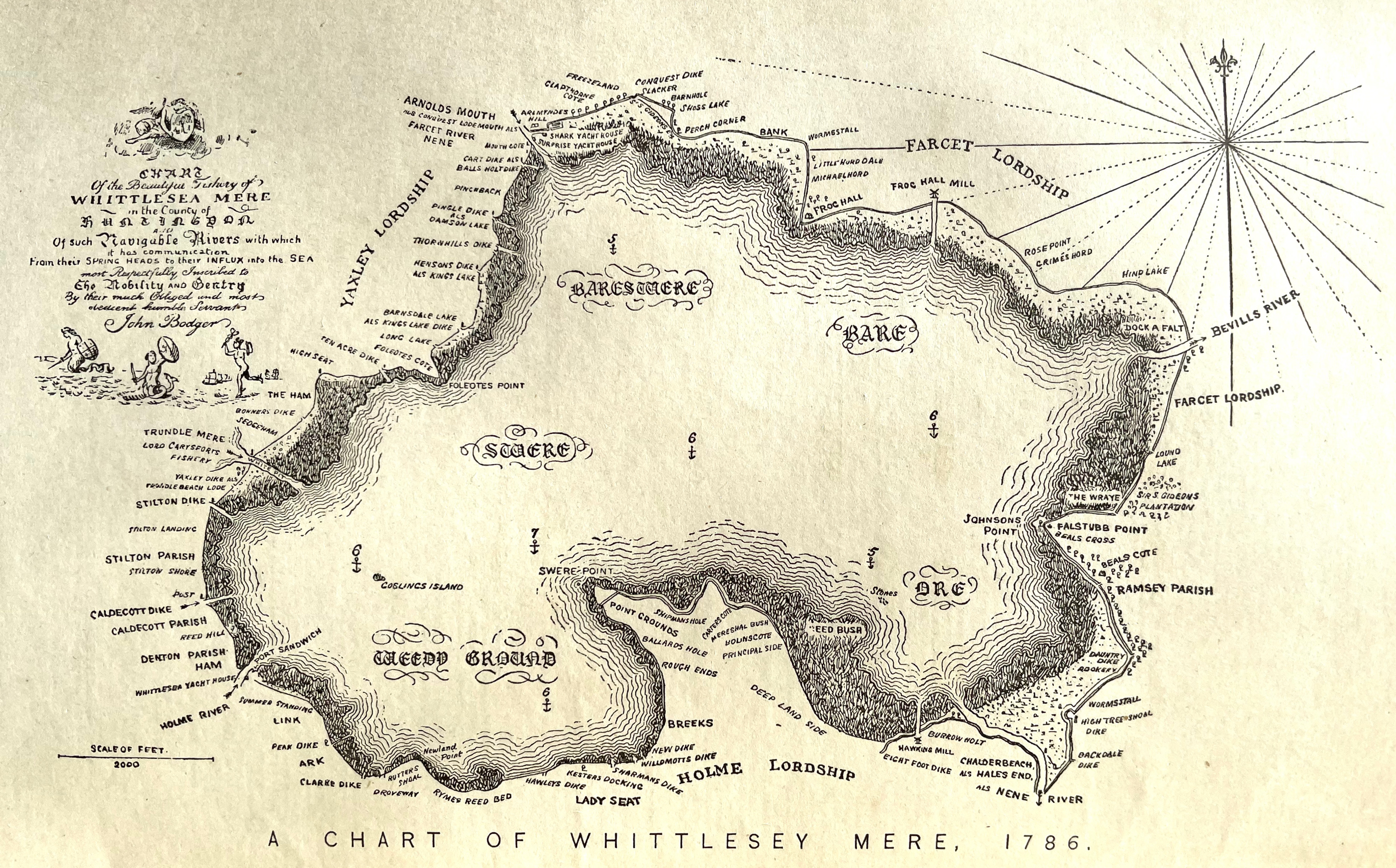
Map made and printed on satin in 1786 by land surveyor John Bodger

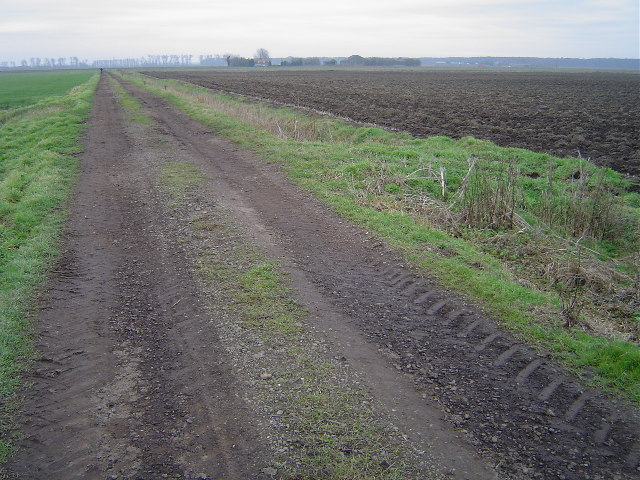
The present-day site of Whittlesey Mere, looking south towards Tower Farm

Whittlesea Mere was an area of open water in the Fenland area of the county of Huntingdonshire (now Cambridgeshire), England. The mere occupied the land southeast of Yaxley Fen, south of Farcet Fen and north of Holme Fen. The town of Whittlesey lay to the northeast.

Whittlesea Mere was the last of the 'great meres' to be drained. The old course of the River Nene took it into the mere on one side and out on the other. The area covered by water was at least 1,870 acres (756 hectares) in summer, extending to 3,000 acres (1,214 ha) in winter. The mere was a source of fish, wildfowl, reed and sedge for local inhabitants, and also provided a setting for 'water picnics' for the region's nobility.

According to the traveller Celia Fiennes, who saw it in 1697, the mere was "3 mile broad and six mile long. In the midst is a little island where a great store of Wildfowle breed.... The ground is all wett and marshy but there are severall little Channells runs into it which by boats people go up to this place; when you enter the mouth of the Mer it looks formidable and its often very dangerous by reason of sudden winds that will rise like Hurricanes...."

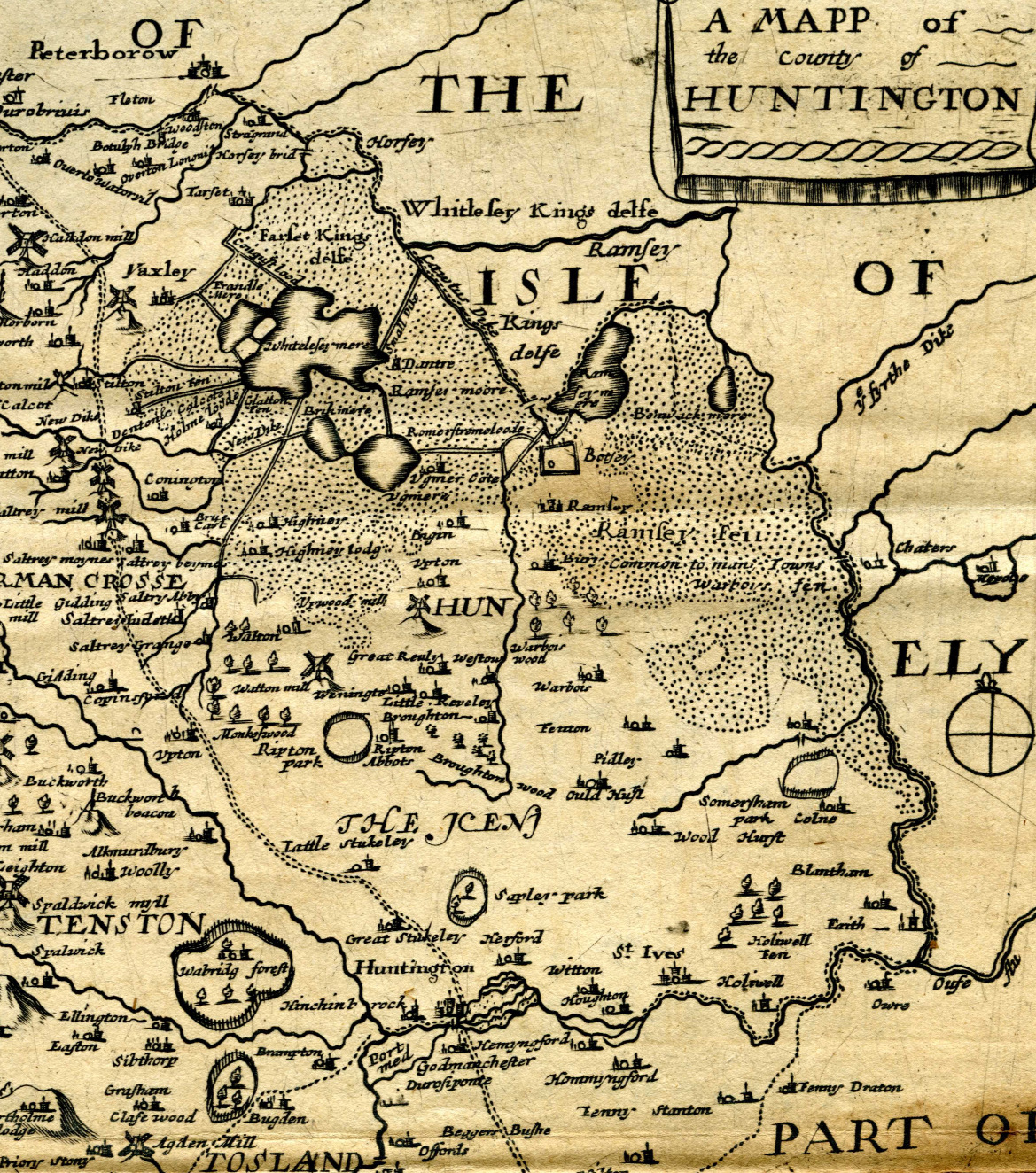
Circa 1660 map showing the size of Whittlesey Mere

== History ==
Before drainage, the fens contained many shallow lakes, of which Whittlesey Mere was the largest. The River Nene originally flowed through this mere, then south to Ugg Mere, before turning east towards the Ouse. The mere was one of the locations of Lord Orford’s voyage round the Fens in 1774.

=== Drainage ===
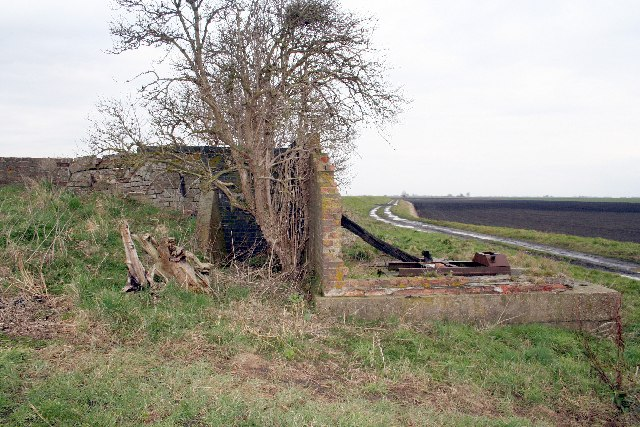
The "Black Ham Engine" used in the 1850s to drain Whittlesey Mere. Unique in that it was turf fired

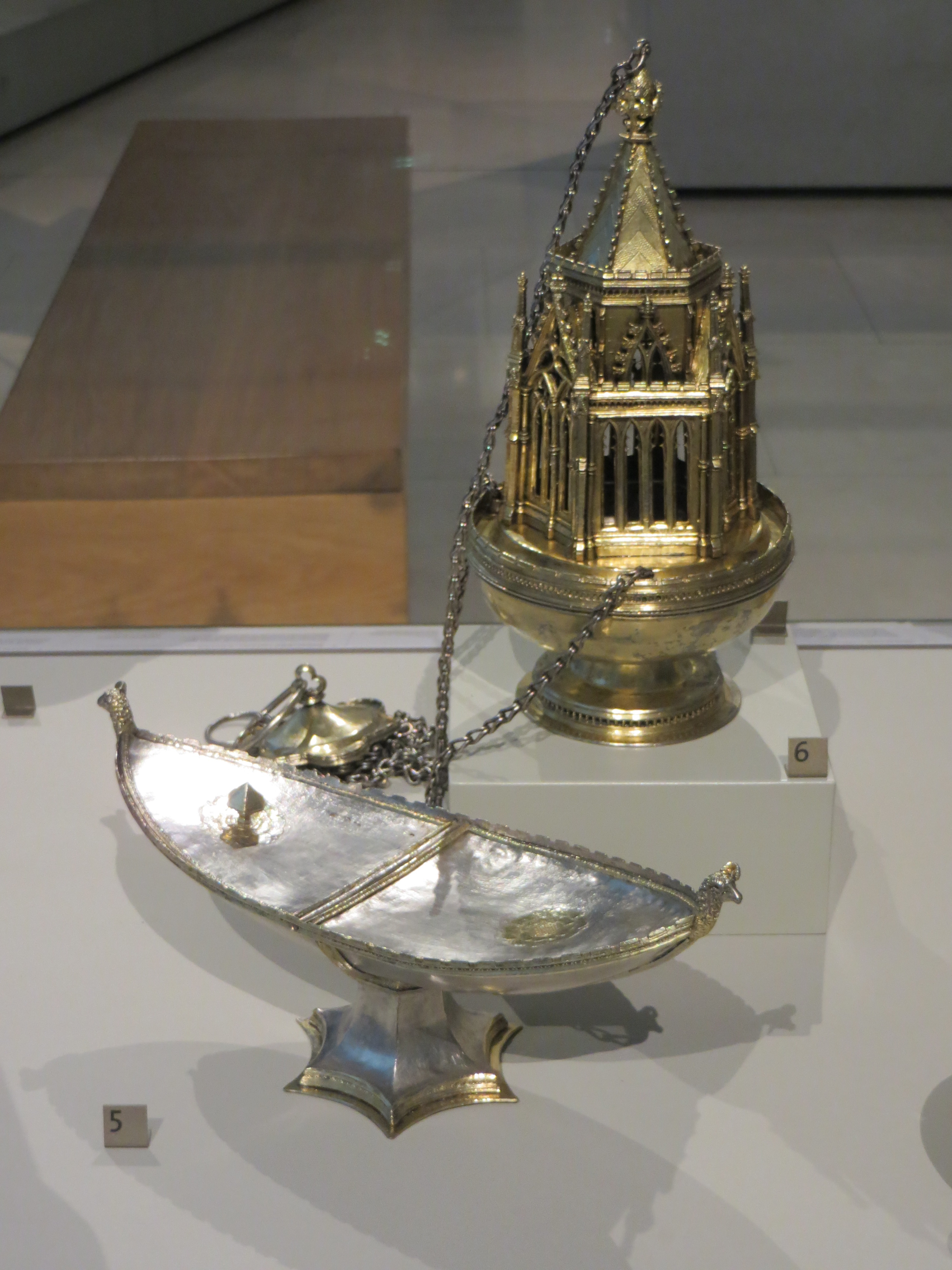
The Ramsey Abbey censer and incense boat in the V&A Museum; they were found when the mere was drained

By 1851, silting and peat expansion had reduced Whittlesey Mere to about 400 ha and only a metre deep. The construction of a new main drain of the Middle Level Navigations to Wiggenhall St Germans completed in 1848, enabled the mere to be drained. A pumping station with an Appold centrifugal pump was used to achieve this, rather than the more traditional scoop wheel. The pump had been shown for the first time at the Great Exhibition in 1851 and its inventor was commissioned to design a pump for the draining of the mere. It was 4.5 feet (1.4 m) in diameter, and powered by a 25 hp (19 kW) steam engine, could raise 101 tons of water per minute by 2 or 3 feet (0.6 or 0.9 m).

The project was funded by a group of gentlemen and local landowners: William Wells of Holmewood; Heathcote of Conington Castle; Edward Fellowes of Ramsey Abbey; Thornhill of Diddington; Lord Sandwich; and Wentworth Fitzwilliam of Milton.

The drainage turned both the mere and Holme Fen into usable farmland, but subsidence followed.

A thurible and other silver items were found in the bed of the mere and from the ram's head on one of these pieces were believed to have come from Ramsey Abbey. The thurible (or censer), incense boat and a sword are now in the Victoria & Albert Museum. Also found in the bed were blocks of quarried stone, which are supposed to have fallen from a barge on their way to the Abbey.

A flood occurred in 1852 and the mere filled with water, but it was drained again. In 1862, the Marshland Sluice gave way under pressure from the tide and water flooded in. It was drained once more and farming resumed.

=== Modern day ===
The name 'Whittlesea Mere' remains on maps to this day, although the only water is to be found in farmers' irrigation reservoirs and dykes draining the fertile farmland. Stage 3 of the Great Fen Project may eventually see the mere return to wetland, although the lake bed is now higher than the former shoreline due to the uneven shrinkage of the surrounding peat as it has dried. Subsidence of four metres since 1852 is shown visually at Holme Posts.

== Local legends ==
A local legend, first recounted in The Leisure Hour (1887) by a writer who claimed to have heard it from the principal actor, tells of a cottager's son from Holme who while employed bird scaring on Holme Fen one Sunday in February, 1851, wandered from his post and sank up to his armpits in the reed beds of Whittlesey Mere. Obscured from view, he remained stuck for 19 hours, which he ascertained from the sound of the bells of All Saints Church, Conington, until a fellow villager found him by chance, extricated him and returned him to his parents.

In his 1911 volume, The Freshwater Fishes of the British Isles, ichthyologist Charles Tate Regan published a third-hand account of 'The Great Pike of Whittlesea Mere', said to have been caught as the mere was drained in 1851. An accompanying chromolithograph put the weight of the fish at 52 lb, leading Regan to state that it "may be regarded as the record English Pike". If genuine, this would surpass the current UK record of 47 lb 5oz set by Lloyd Watson in February 2024.
