= Great Fen =

Habitat restoration project in England

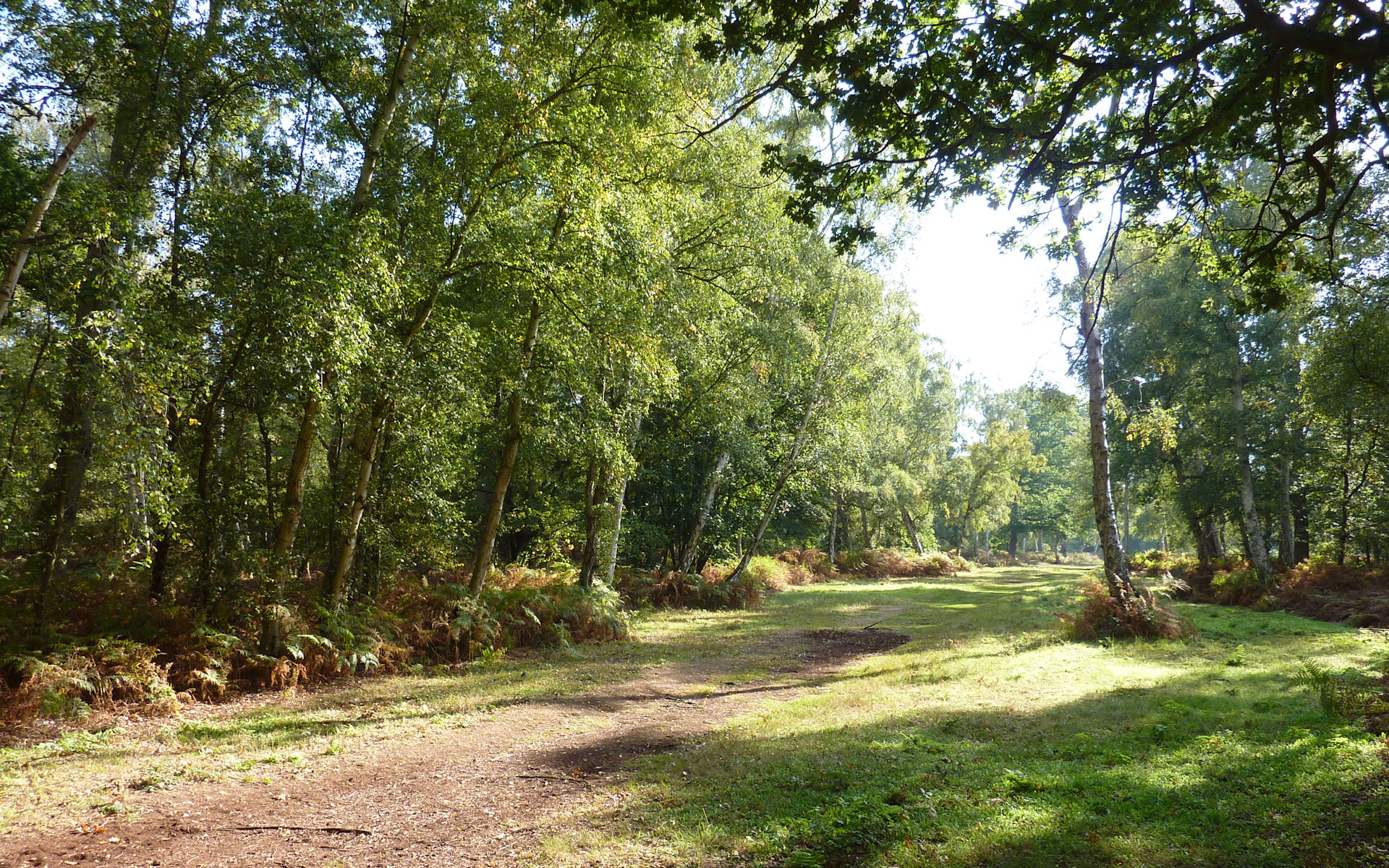
- Holme Fen
- Interactive map of Great Fen
- Location: Ramsey, Cambridgeshire
- Coordinates: 52°28′N 0°12′W
- Area: 1,184 ha (4.57 sq mi)
- Operator: Natural England and the Wildlife Trust for Bedfordshire, Cambridgeshire and Northamptonshire
- Website: http://www.greatfen.org.uk/

The Great Fen is a habitat restoration project being undertaken on The Fens in the county of Cambridgeshire in England. It is one of the largest restoration projects in the country, and aims to create a 3,700 hectare wetland and aims to connect Woodwalton Fen National Nature Reserve (NNR), Holme Fen NNR and other nature reserves to create a larger site with conservation benefits for wildlife and socio-economic benefits for people.

This is a long-term project managed in partnership by the Environment Agency, Huntingdonshire District Council, Middle Level Commissioners, Natural England and the Wildlife Trust for Bedfordshire, Cambridgeshire and Northamptonshire (WTBCN).

Woodwalton Fen, Holme Fen and Darlows Farm are managed by Natural England, while the WTBCN manages the Countryside Centre for educational and community work, together with Corney's Farm, New Decoy Farm, Old Decoy Farm, Engine Farm, Rymes Reedbeds (which has a bird hide), and Kesters Docking.

== Woodwalton Fen ==
Woodwalton Fen is one of Britain's oldest nature reserves and occupies a substantial site of 208 ha north-east of Huntingdon. Its international importance has been repeatedly recognised in its designations as a Ramsar site, a Special Area of Conservation (SAC), a Site of Special Scientific Interest (SSSI) and a national nature reserve (NNR).

Woodwalton is a key component of the Great Fen Project and features a variety of fen habitats. The result is an attractive reserve with an impressive list of rare plants and animals. Habitats include Purple Moor Grass meadows, tall fen and scrub communities, woodland, and other assemblages of grasses, sedges, herbs and mosses.

== Holme Fen ==
Holme Fen is situated south of Peterborough, around 5 km north-west of Woodwalton Fen and on the south-western shore of the former Whittlesey Mere. The Fen occupies a crescent-shaped site approximately 2.5 km long by 1.5 km wide and has been designated as a Site of Special Scientific Interest (SSSI) and Geological Conservation Review Site (GCR).

Holme Fen is the largest Silver birch woodland in lowland Britain. More importantly it contains approximately 5 hectares of rare acid grassland and heath and a hectare of remnant raised bog, an echo of the habitat that would have dominated the area centuries ago. This is the most south-easterly bog of its type in Britain.

Holme is a key component of the Great Fen Project for it approximately marks the south-western limit of Stage 2 of the Project plan. The reserve is open to the public throughout the year.

== Wildlife Trust for Bedfordshire, Cambridgeshire and Northamptonshire ==
The fields of New Decoy Farm are being made wildlife friendly with new ditches and scrapes, and grazing cattle. Rymes Reedbeds is also being restored with new reedbeds on open water. Kesters Docking is being sown as species-poor grassland, and it will also have areas of open water and reedbeds.
