= Oakdale =

Oakdale or Oak Dale may refer to:

== Australia ==
- Oakdale, New South Wales
- Oakdale, Queensland, a locality in the South Burnett Region

== Canada ==
- Rural Municipality of Oakdale No. 320, Saskatchewan
- Oakdale Golf & Country Club, North York, Toronto, Ontario, Canada

== United Kingdom ==
- Oakdale, Caerphilly
- Oakdale, Dorset

== United States ==
- Oakdale, California
- Oakdale, Connecticut
- Oakdale, Illinois
- Oakdale, Iowa
- Oak Dale, Howard County, Iowa
- Oakdale, Louisiana
- Oakdale, Louisville, Kentucky
- Oakdale, a neighborhood in Dedham, Massachusetts
- Oakdale, Holyoke, Massachusetts
- Oakdale, West Boylston, Massachusetts
- Oakdale, Minnesota
- Oakdale, Missouri
- Oakdale, Nebraska
- Oakdale, New York
- Oakdale, Pennsylvania
- Oakdale, a neighborhood in Portland, Maine
- Oakdale, Tennessee
- Oakdale, Texas
- Oak Dale, Texas
- Oakdale, Wisconsin
- Oakdale (town), Wisconsin
- Oakdale Township (disambiguation), any of several townships within the United States
- Toyota Oakdale Theatre, in Wallingford, Connecticut

=== Historical sites ===
- Oakdale Historic District (Mobile, Alabama)
- Oakdale Historic District (Fort Wayne, Indiana)
- Oakdale School (Madison, Indiana)
- Oakdale District, listed on the NRHP in Louisville, Kentucky
- Oakdale Manor, the former home of early 20th century Maryland Governor Edwin Warfield
- Oakdale Village Historic District, listed on the NRHP in West Boylston, Massachusetts
- Oakdale Cotton Mill Village, in Jamestown, North Carolina
- South Oakdale Historic District, in Medford, Oregon
- Oakdale (Pennsbury Township, Pennsylvania), a historic home
- Oakdale Public School, in Allegheny County, Pennsylvania
- Oakdale (Floyd, Virginia), a historic home and farm
- Governor Joseph Johnson House (also known as Oakdale), in Bridgeport, West Virginia

=== Fictional U.S. places ===
- Oakdale, Illinois, the fictional setting for the soap opera As the World Turns
- Oakdale, Texas (Wishbone TV series)

== See also ==
- Oakdale Cemetery (disambiguation)
- Oakdale School (disambiguation)
