= List of schools in Bournemouth, Christchurch and Poole =

This is a list of schools in Bournemouth, Christchurch and Poole in the English county of Dorset.

== State-funded schools ==
=== Primary schools ===
- Ad Astra Infant School, Canford Heath
- Avonwood Primary School, Bournemouth
- Baden-Powell and St Peters CE Junior School, Parkstone
- Bayside Academy, Hamworthy
- Livingstone Road Preschool, Infant & Junior Schools
- Bethany CE Junior School, Boscombe
- Bishop Aldhelm's CE Primary School, Branksome
- Broadstone First School, Broadstone
- Burton CE Primary School, Burton
- Canford Heath Infant School, Canford Heath
- Canford Heath Junior School, Canford Heath
- Christ The King RC Primary School, Kinson
- Christchurch Infant School, Christchurch
- Christchurch Junior School, Christchurch
- Corpus Christi RC Primary School, Boscombe
- Courthill Infant School, Parkstone
- Elm Academy, Bournemouth
- The Epiphany School, Bournemouth
- Hamworthy Park Junior School, Hamworthy
- Haymoor Junior School, Canford Heath
- Heatherlands Primary School, Parkstone
- Heathlands Primary Academy, Bournemouth
- Highcliffe St Mark Primary School, Highcliffe
- Hill View Primary School, Ensbury Park
- Hillbourne Primary School, Waterloo
- Jewell Academy, Bournemouth
- King's Park Academy, Boscombe
- Kingsleigh Primary School, Bournemouth
- Kinson Academy, Kinson
- Lilliput CE Infant School, Lilliput
- Livingstone Academy, Bournemouth
- Livingstone Road Infant School, Parkstone
- Livingstone Road Junior School, Parkstone
- Longfleet CE Primary School, Longfleet
- Malmesbury Park Primary School, Bournemouth
- Manorside Academy, Parkstone
- Merley First School, Merley
- Moordown St John's CE Primary School, Bournemouth
- Mudeford Community Infants' School, Mudeford
- Mudeford Junior School, Mudeford
- Muscliff Primary School, Throop
- Oakdale Junior School, Oakdale
- Ocean Academy, Poole
- Old Town Infant School, Poole
- Parkfield School, Hurn
- Pokesdown Community Primary School, Bournemouth
- The Priory CE Primary School, Christchurch
- Queens Park Infant Academy, Bournemouth
- Queens Park Junior Academy, Bournemouth
- St Clement's and St John's CE Infant School, Boscombe
- St James' CE Primary Academy, Bournemouth
- St Joseph's RC Primary School, Parkstone
- St Joseph's RC Primary School, Somerford
- St Katharine's CE Primary School, Southbourne
- St Luke's CE Primary School, Winton
- St Mark's CE Primary School, Talbot Village
- St Mary's RC Primary School, Oakdale
- St Michael's CE Primary School, Bournemouth
- St Peter's RC School, Bournemouth
- St Walburga's RC Primary School, Bournemouth
- Somerford Primary School, Somerford
- Springdale First School, Broadstone
- Stanley Green Infant Academy, Oakdale
- Stourfield Infant School, Southbourne
- Stourfield Junior School, Southbourne
- Talbot Primary School, Wallisdown
- Twin Sails Infant School, Hamworthy
- Twynham Primary School, Christchurch
- Winton Primary School, Ensbury Park

=== Middle schools ===
- Broadstone Middle School, Broadstone

=== Non-selective secondary schools ===
- Avonbourne Boys' Academy, Littledown
- Avonbourne Girls' Academy, Littledown
- The Bishop of Winchester Academy, Charminster
- The Bourne Academy, East Howe
- Corfe Hills School, Broadstone
- The Cornerstone Academy, Hamworthy
- Glenmoor Academy, Ensbury Park
- The Grange School, Christchurch
- Highcliffe School, Highcliffe
- LeAF Studio, West Howe
- Livingstone Academy, Bournemouth
- Magna Academy, Canford Heath
- Oak Academy, West Howe
- Poole High School, Oakdale
- St Aldhelm's Academy, Parkstone
- St Edward's RC CE School, Oakdale
- St Peter's RC School, Southbourne
- Twynham School, Christchurch
- Winton Academy, Ensbury Park

=== Grammar schools ===
- Bournemouth School, Charminster
- Bournemouth School for Girls, Charminster
- Parkstone Grammar School, Waterloo
- Poole Grammar School, Broadstone/Canford Heath

=== Special and alternative schools ===
- Christchurch Learning Centre, Christchurch
- Linwood School, Winton
- Longspee School, Canford Heath
- Montacute School, Canford Heath
- The Quay School, Parkstone
- Tregonwell Academy, Bournemouth
- Winchelsea School, Parkstone

=== Further education ===
- Bournemouth Academy of Modern Music
- The Bournemouth and Poole College

== Independent schools ==
=== Primary and preparatory schools ===
- Park School, Bournemouth
- St Martin's School, Bournemouth
- St Thomas Garnet's School, Boscombe
- Talbot House School, Winton

=== Senior and all-through schools ===
- Bournemouth Collegiate School, Parkstone/Southbourne
- Canford School, Canford Magna
- Kings Bournemouth, Bournemouth
- Talbot Heath School, Bournemouth

=== Special and alternative schools ===
- Connie Rothman Learning Centre, Southbourne
- Langside School, Poole
- The Lion Works School, Poole
- Portfield School, Christchurch
- The Stable School, Christchurch
- Victoria Education Centre, Branksome Park
- The White House School, Poole
