= Oakdale School =

Oakdale School may refer to:

- Oakdale Comprehensive School in Oakdale, Caerphilly county, Wales
- Any of several schools named Oakdale High School (disambiguation)
- Oakdale Public School in Oakdale, Pennsylvania
- Oakdale School (Madison, Indiana), included in National Register of Historic Places listings in Jefferson County, Indiana
- Oakdale School (Tennessee) in Oakdale, Tennessee
- Oakdale School, Poole, Dorset
- Oakdale Junior School in Poole, Dorset

== See also ==
- Oakdale Joint Unified School District (California)
- Oakdale (disambiguation)
