= Ambitions Academies Trust =

Multi-academy trust in Dorset, England

The Ambitions Academies Trust
- Founded: 6 March 2012
- Type: Multi-academy Trust
- Registration no.: 07977940
- Location: Manorside Academy, Evering Avenue, Poole, BH12 4JG
- Website: www.ambitions-academies.co.uk

Ambitions Academies Trust is a multi-academy trust, serving schools in or close to Bournemouth and Weymouth, Dorset.

== Primary academies ==
- Manorside Primary
- Elm Academy
- Queen's Park Academy
- King's Park Academy
- Bayside Academy
- Kinson Academy

== Secondary academies ==
- St Aldhelm's Academy
- LeAF Studio
- Oak Academy, Bournemouth
- All Saints Church of England Academy, Wyke Regis
- Wey Valley Academy, Weymouth

== Specials ==
- Tregonwell Academy - is for statemented pupils with Behavioural, Emotional and Social Difficulties; it provides Alternative Provision a Pupil Placement Service and support to mainstream schools and other academies through CPD, leadership, behaviour management and safeguarding training. It started as a residential school for boys called Bicknell School in 1968. It operates on three campuses: Petersfield Campus, Nigel Bowes Campus and Throop Learning Centre.
- Longspree Academy
