= St Aldhelm's Academy =

Location
- Herbert Avenue; Poole, Dorset, BH12 4HS; England; 50°44′33″N 1°56′01″W

Information
- Type: Academy
- Motto: High expectations lead to high achievers
- Established: 1938
- Local authority: Bournemouth, Christchurch and Poole
- Trust: Ambitions Academies Trust
- Department for Education URN: 136206 Tables
- Ofsted: Reports
- Principal: Donald Mustard
- Staff: 130+
- Gender: Co-educational
- Age: 11 to 16
- Enrolment: 791
- Website: www.staldhelms-academy.co.uk

St Aldhelm's Academy is a co-educational secondary school serving the Rossmore, Parkstone, Newtown, Wallisdown and Alderney areas of Poole, Dorset, England.

== School history ==
The school opened in October 1938 as Kemp-Welch Senior Council School and taught both boys and girls —the boys were housed in the west side of the building, while the girls were housed in the east. This was typical for a school of its time. There was a 'quad' in the middle of the school which divided the two schools.

The school became a secondary modern after the Second World War and expanded rapidly in 1963 to house 600 students in both schools. An East Block was built onto the girls' school, housing additional classrooms, art rooms and a music room. The West Block was built across the boys' playground and housed classrooms, science labs and the boys' music room. Prior to this, new workshops and kitchens had been built. The boys' gym was built onto the rear of the boys' half of the main block (now the technology block) and the girls' gym was built on the school field and is now part of the leisure centre.

In 1974 the two schools merged to form one large school and the age was changed from 11–16 to 12–16. Not a great deal changed at the school over the next 15 years and the school fell into a state of disrepair. Pupil numbers dropped in the 1980s and 1990s leaving the school with empty classrooms. The leisure centre first opened onto the former girls' gym in 1992 and the second phase opened in 1998. In 1994 the school opened its sixth form. Despite this, the school was being seen as a 'rough school' with many parents in the local area sending their children to other schools. In 1999 only half of the children from Branksome Heath Middle School (largest in catchment) went to Kemp-Welch with the remainder going to either Poole or Parkstone Grammar School, Poole High or St Edwards Schools.

In 2000 the school was put into 'special measures' by Ofsted and the school aimed to improve itself in time for its next Ofsted visit or face closure. The school changed its name to Rossmore Community College and underwent a major building program to reinvent itself.

In September 2003 the school became a sports college, one of two in Poole. On 1 September 2010, the school opened as St. Aldhelms Academy under the new Academies Act 2010. The school also came under the jurisdiction of the Church of England.

In 2013, the school's new £9.8 million new buildings opened.

In recent years, the school has faced a number of issues; it became national news in 2012 when it was reported that the school had achieved the worst GCSE results in England. In 2014, the school became national news again when it lost £1,000,000 in an online banking scam; this was the second time that then-headteacher Cheryl Heron has been victim of scamming, as her previous school in Portsmouth were conned in a charity golf event. Another issue under Cheryl Heron's time as headteacher, according to a 2015 article in The Independent, was building work that had occurred in the school, which involved "open-plan classrooms" that housed up to five different classes at a time. This was reported as one of Heron's several failed ideas; in previous schools, she had tried implementing "ability over age" classes, wherein students were streamed based on ability regardless of age, and devised a plan for students with poor attendance to have more flexible school hours. The school achieved mainstream media recognition again in 2015, when it was forced to close after a significant number of staff members called in sick and cover staff could not be found. The school's closure coincided with a surprise inspection by OFSTED, who later described the school as "dysfunctional and unsafe".

As of 1 June 2015, the school's new sponsor, Ambitions Academdies Trust, took over the running and management of the school.

== Leisure centre ==
Rossmore Leisure Centre is located next to the school. This facility is used for Physical Education lessons, and is also open to the public. It comprises a sports hall, gym, fitness suite and a swimming pool, and is adjoined by a sports field and tennis courts.

The original Leisure Centre was built in 1992 onto the sports block and included the gym, sports hall, fitness studio and a new canteen for the school (used for parties for the public). In 1998 the centre was extended further with a new swimming pool (the Herbert Ballam pool), new fitness studio (the old studio became a bar) and a gymnastics hall which has trained Olympic contestants. The centre was original Kemp-Welch Leisure Centre, but became Rossmore Leisure Centre in January 2003.

== Notable former pupils ==
- Eddie Argos, lead singer of Art Brut, attended the school as Kevin Macklin
