= St George's Church, Oakdale =

Church in Dorset, England

St George's Church
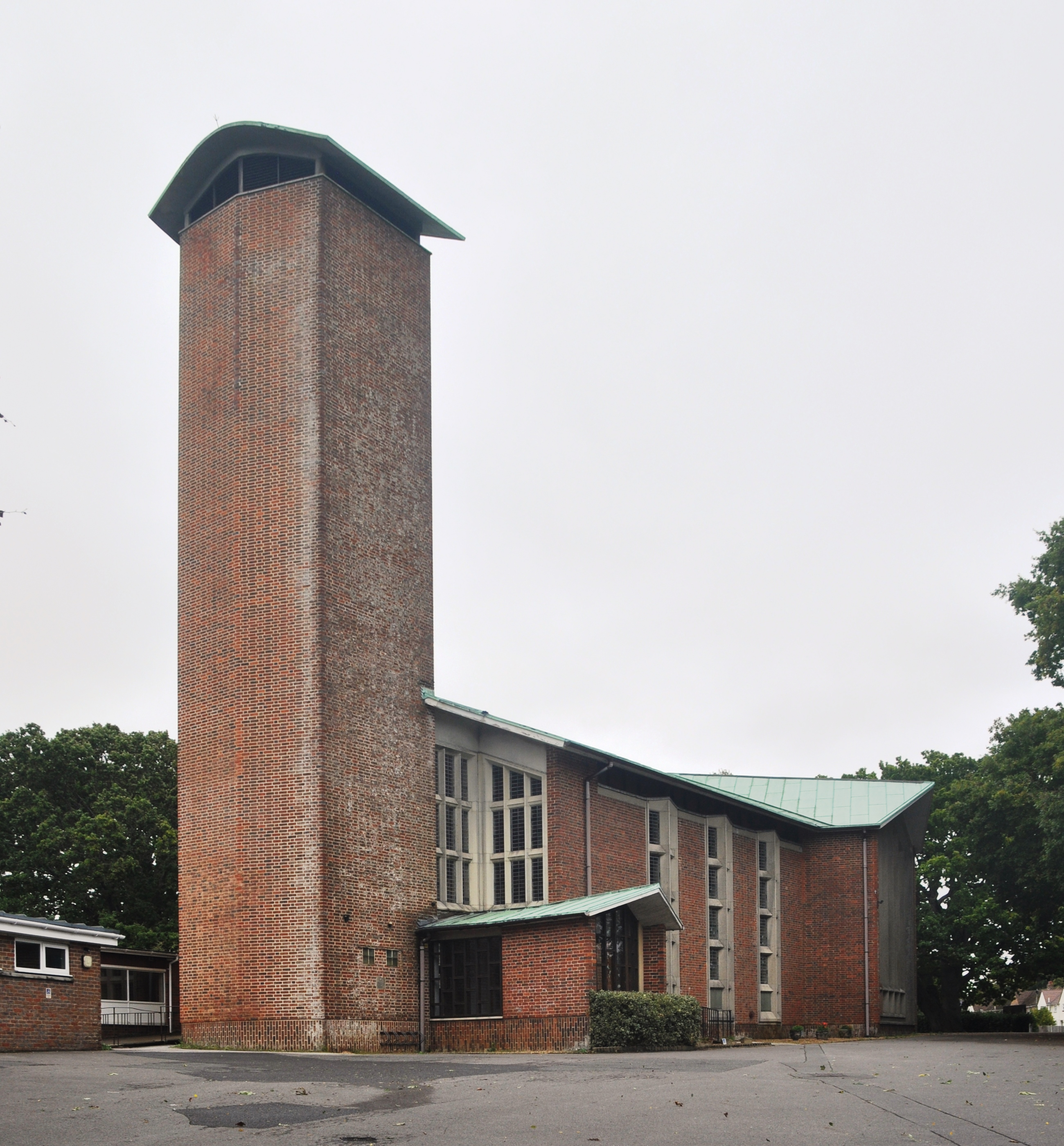
- St George's Church in September 2025

Religion
- Affiliation: Church of England
- Year consecrated: 1960

Location
- Location: Oakdale, Poole, Dorset, England
- Interactive map of St George's Church
- Coordinates: 50.7373°N 1.9777°W

Architecture
- Architects: Robert Potter; Richard Hare
- Type: Church

St George's Church is a Church of England church in Oakdale, a suburb of Poole, Dorset, England. It was built in 1959–60 and has been Grade II Listed since 1998.

== History ==
The first purpose-built church to serve the population of Oakdale was erected in 1932 and is now in use as Oakdale Library. As the suburb's population rapidly grew and Oakdale became its own parish in 1938, a larger place of worship became necessary. The earliest efforts towards a new church dated to 1939 when £2,000 was bequeathed by Miss Gaskell and a one-acre site at Darby's Lane was donated by Mr. R. Aireton.

In 1947, the Western Gazette reported that Oakdale was in "urgent need" of a new church as the original St George's was consistently overcrowded. Enough funds for a replacement had been raised during the 1950s and the designs of St George's were drawn up by Robert Potter and Richard Hare. The foundation stone was laid on 25 April 1959 by Maurice Key, Bishop of Sherborne and the church was completed in 1960 and consecrated in July.

== Architecture ==
St George's is built of red brick with copper sheeting on its roof. The building has a cruciform plan with short transepts and a tower to the west. The church shares architectural similarities with the Church of the Ascension in Crownhill, Plymouth, which was also designed by Potter and Hare, and opened in 1958. Historic England describes St George's as a "beautifully detailed and crafted church" which displays influences of Ninian Comper and the Liturgical Movement.
