= Robert Potter (architect) =

English architect (1909–2010)

- Born: 6 October 1909; Guildford, Surrey
- Died: 30 November 2010 (aged 101)
- Education: Regent Street Polytechnic
- Occupation: Architect
- Awards: OBE
- Practice: Brandt, Potter, Hare
- Buildings: St Francis's Church, Salisbury; Church of the Ascension, Crownhill; South Stoneham Tower
- Projects: Chichester Cathedral; Bodleian Library; St Stephen Walbrook; All Souls Church, Langham Place; St Paul's Cathedral; St Peter Mancroft

Robert James Potter OBE (6 October 1909 – 30 November 2010) was an English architect who was noted for his work on church buildings. He studied architecture in London before moving to Salisbury where he established his practice.

== Early life and education ==
Potter was born in Guildford, Surrey to Jack Potter, an engraver who worked on printing blocks for Bank of England banknotes, and his wife Florence. After school he studied architecture at the Regent Street Polytechnic.

== Career ==
Potter moved to Salisbury in 1935, aged 26, establishing an architectural practice there. Within three years he was commissioned to design St Francis's Church in the city, which has subsequently become a listed building.

In the Second World War he served in the Royal Engineers in northern India where he was involved in constructing road and rail networks to enable troop movements to the war in the Far East. He attained the rank of lieutenant-colonel during his wartime service.

After the war he returned to Salisbury and began a professional partnership with William Randoll Blacking, who had studied under Sir Ninian Comper and was known for his design and conservation work on ecclesiastical buildings. Their partnership lasted 11 years, after which Potter established his own firm with a new partner, Richard Hare, based in De Vaux House in Salisbury.

Potter's designs included military and residential buildings (such as the extensive extension to South Stoneham House in Southampton) but his primary focus was on church architecture; in 1958 his Church of the Ascension, Crownhill in Plymouth was consecrated and in 1959 he started work on St George's, in Oakdale, Poole. Potter's practice expanded in 1967, being renamed the Brandt, Potter, Hare Partnership and opening an office in Southampton.

Potter's work was not purely on new builds. He was involved in substantial renovation works to a number of well known buildings including Chichester Cathedral, Oxford's Bodleian Library, St Peter Mancroft (the largest church building in Norwich other than the city's cathedrals) and St Stephen Walbrook, All Souls Church, Langham Place and St Paul's Cathedral, all in central London. He became well known for creating community rooms under the foundations of ancient church buildings and earned the nickname "The Mole" as a result. In addition to his work on the buildings themselves, Potter was noted for his designs of fixtures and fittings including organs, crosses, candlesticks and fonts.

From 1978 to 1984, he was Surveyor of the Fabric of St Paul's Cathedral.

In 1989 Potter's designs were used to extend the St Edward the Confessor Roman Catholic Church in Chandler's Ford, Hampshire, where the original building had been designed by Potter's first professional partner, William Randoll Blacking.

Potter was awarded the OBE in 1993.

== Personal life ==
Potter married Geraldine Buchanan when he moved to Salisbury in 1935. They had three children together but divorced in the early 1960s. He married again to Margaret and had two stepchildren. He enjoyed watercolour painting and sailing, having obtained a master mariner's certificate.

== Notable works ==
Notable buildings that Potter designed or worked on include:

Year	Building	Image	Location	Potter's role	Building status
1938	St Francis Church Salisbury		Salisbury, Wiltshire	Architect	Grade II listed
1955–1977	Chichester Cathedral		Chichester, West Sussex	Assisted with renovation; established masons' workshop	Grade I listed
1958	Church of the Ascension, Crownhill		Crownhill, Plymouth, Devon	Architect	Grade II listed
1960	St George's Church		Oakdale, Poole, Dorset	Architect	Grade II listed
1960s	St Peter Mancroft		Norwich, Norfolk	Architect (roof replacement)	Grade I listed
1964	South Stoneham House		Swaythling, Southampton	Architect of major extension including 17-storey tower block	Demolished. The original Grade II* listed manor house still stands.
1967	All Saints Clifton		Clifton, Bristol	Architect (rebuilding)	Grade II listed
1970s	St Paul's Cathedral		City of London, London	Surveyor to the Fabric	Grade I listed
1976	Lincoln College Library (formerly All Saints Church)		Oxford, Oxfordshire	Conversion of church building into library	Grade I listed
1988	St Andrew's Church, Goldsworth Park		Goldsworth Park, Woking, Surrey	Architect	–
1989	Church of St Edward the Confessor, Chandler's Ford		Chandler's Ford, Hampshire	Architect (extension)	
Unknown	Bodleian Library		Oxford, Oxfordshire	Architect (structural reinforcements)	Grade I listed
Unknown	St Stephen Walbrook		City of London, London	Architect (renovations/repairs)	Grade I listed
Unknown	All Souls Church, Langham Place		Marylebone, London	Architect (renovations/repairs)	Grade I listed
Unknown	St Matthew's Church, Bridgemary		Bridgemary, Gosport, Hampshire	Architect (with Richard Hare)	
