= George Tompkins (composer) =

American composer

George Ira Tompkins
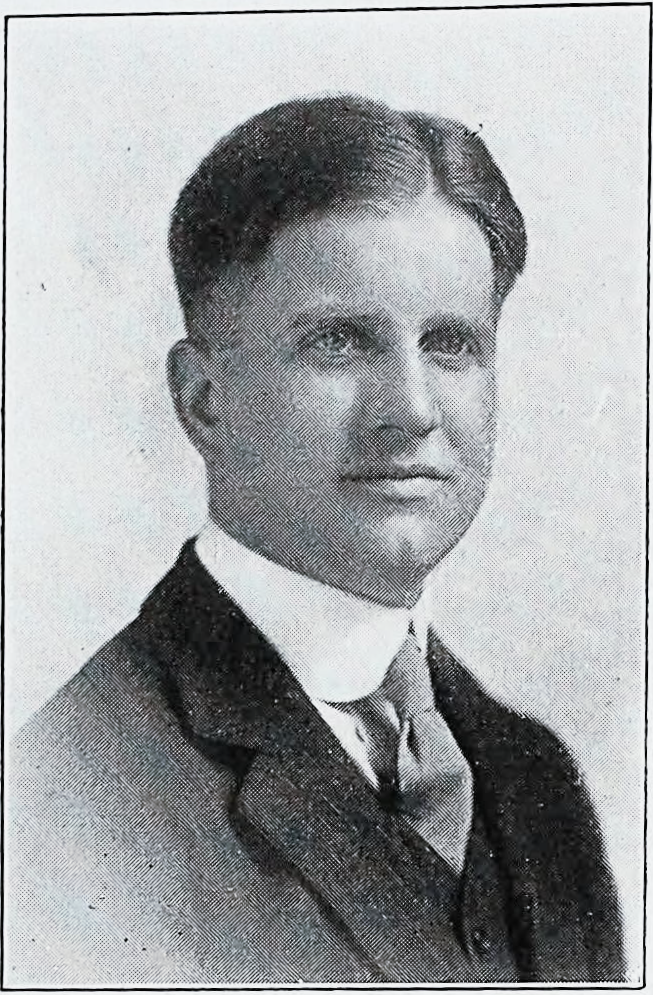
- Portrait of composer George Ira Tompkins, c. 1914
- Born: July 1, 1888
- Died: 1972 (aged 83–84)
- Occupations: Composer, violinist, pianist and teacher

George Ira Tompkins (1888–1972), was a ragtime composer, vocal director and music teacher from Waterbury, Connecticut. His musical contributions in the early 20th century in the Farmington and Naugatuck Valley regions of Connecticut were numerous. He was one of the earliest violin students of The Institute of Musical Art (known today as The Juilliard School) and was also active as a violinist in the New York Symphony Orchestra.

== Education and background ==
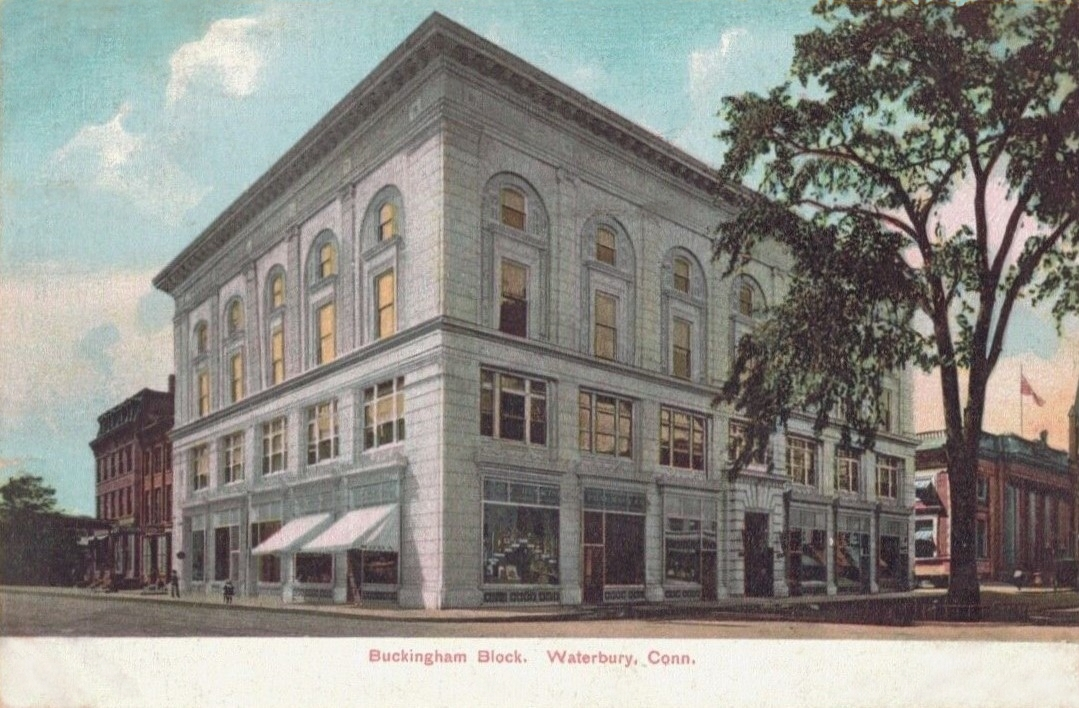
Postcard of Buckingham Hall in Waterbury, Connecticut, 1907

George Tompkins was a local musician to the populous city of Waterbury, Connecticut in the early 20th century. Tompkins was born on July 1, 1888 in the same city. He was the grandson of George Tompkins of Waterbury, leader of the Tompkins band in that city in the mid-late 19th century, which played at the funeral of President Abraham Lincoln in 1863. Tompkins was a student at Crosby High School while in Waterbury. He started out in Waterbury as a violinist before moving to Simsbury, Connecticut. Prior to 1905, George Tompkins had played in the first Waterbury Symphony Orchestra, giving a violin performance at its final concert on May 23, 1905, at the Poli's Theater of Waterbury. By age 16, George Tompkins was attending the Yale School of Music and was awarded a Lockwood scholarship in 1906. He was a student of violin professor Isidor Troostwyk. In 1907, he accompanied a vocal quartet based in Connecticut on violin in a concert at Buckingham Hall, alongside operatic baritone, David Bispham. A music reviewer commented on Tompkins' ability at the violin following a concert that same year saying, "George I. Tompkins continues to grow more proficient in the art of playing the violin and his ability is showing itself more in every appearance. Walter's "Preislied" was a difficult selection, but it seemed anything but hard to the young artist, who is fast winning laurels in the musical world". W.E. Clark of The Phonograph Co. of Chicago described Tompkins as "a violinist of marked ability" following a performance of Henryk Wieniawski's Concerto in D Minor at Woolsey Hall. Tompkins graduated from the Yale School of Music in 1908, following a period as conductor of the Yale Dramatic association production of "Revizor" by Nikolai Gogol.

Following studies at Yale, George Tompkins was among the earliest violin students of The Institute of Musical Art. Attending the institute for two years, graduating in 1910, Tompkins would become a member of the New York Symphony Orchestra in 1908, participating in many concerts along the Jersey Shore during this time.

== Tariffville and Greater Simsbury ==
His name first appears in connection with violin students who later joined the Liberty Orchestra of Simsbury, Connecticut which played especially for the "Welfare dances" of the town after World War I. Many musicians that comprised this orchestra were from the small village of Tariffville, including many Polish-Americans, led by violinist Edwin Varjenski. George was also a leader of the local Chautauqua organization in 1915.

Tompkins is listed as the only violin instructor in the town of Simsbury for the year 1913, and likely the sole music instructor for many years prior.

By 1915, Tompkins appears as an instructor at the Westminster School of Simsbury, arranging many performances with private students for the Simsbury community as arranger and accompanist. He served as musical director for the Westminster School dramatic productions, The Yellow Faun and The Elephant's Remorse, in collaboration with author C.C. S. Cushing in 1913 and 1914 respectively. Tompkins was affiliated with the Westminster School as early as 1912. He served as choral director, piano accompanist as well as organist during his tenure.

== Composer and conductor ==
In private pursuits, Tompkins was active as a composer of ragtime and popular music of the 1910s. His first pieces of music were published in 1912, including "The Mexican Rag", which was originally sung by the Westminster School Dramatic Club. One of his earlier publications being "Beaux Esprits" in 1913, was popularized by an arrangement by James C. McCabe, staff arranger for Arthur Pryor's band and Joseph C. Smith's orchestra. A popular recording of this piece was made by Columbia Records in 1914 by Prince's Band, arrangement by Ford Dabney, being sold by Columbia into 1916. Beaux Esprits was featured in dance-duo, Vernon and Irene Castle's 1914 popular dances. By 1915, it was in use as an accompaniment for dramatic productions and silent films.

Tompkins's reputation as a violinist had succeeded that of his composing, evidenced by a passage from 1915 in The Musician titled "The College Man in Music". Despite this, Tompkins would continue to publish more music for the stage and method books of piano. By 1917, he was engaged as a teacher at The Taft School in Watertown, Connecticut. While a teacher at this institution, he was leader of the Watertown Choral Club chorus and was asked to conduct his own compositions with the Boston Festival Orchestra. He was drafted into the U.S. Army that same year during World War I, serving with the 73rd Infantry of the 12th Division. During his service, he was concertmaster of the Seventy-Third Regimental Orchestra, which performed works exclusively published by Jerome H. Remick, the same publisher Tompkins had worked with years earlier in publishing "Beaux Esprits". In 1918, Remick would also publish Tompkins's proto-jazz composition, "Cassandra". For a brief time, Tompkins was engaged in Florida to produce music for student productions at the University of Florida, including a successful production called Out of the East in May 1921. In 1922, Tompkins was invited to New York to produce music for a Broadway musical called "Get In Step", for the Seventh Regiment benefit. It premiered at the Lexington Theatre on April 27, 1922. Tompkins was described by Etude Magazine in May 1922 as "a most promising American composer who has original ideas and methods of presentation with-out needless or extravagant methods of treatment". He was awarded third place in the 1922–23 Etude Prize Contest for choral composition.

== Westport Players and later years ==
George Tompkins removed to Westport, Connecticut following his time in Watertown, and remained there throughout the 1920s and 1930s. He was first, director of the Westport Choral Club. Henceforth, he became affiliated with the "Westport Players". Also while in Westport, Tompkins was on the committee of the larger Community Concerts Corporation of New York led by Sigmund Spaeth, which promoted classical music concerts by famous musicians in various parts of the country. In 1935, he was assisting with the original production of Snowed Under, a play by Burton Davis, later adapted into the 1936 Warner Bros. film of the same name.

By 1937, Tompkins was the host of a local radio show, "Young Playmates" on WICC in Bridgeport, Connecticut as an educational speaker for children who wanted to be in the radio business. They were also given opportunities to demonstrate their talent on the air.

Tompkins directed The Manufacturers' Chorus of Bridgeport, into the 1940s, and following World War II.

== Death and legacy ==
Tompkins died in 1972 in Connecticut. His authorship of the 1918 foxtrot, "Cassandra", was unknown for many years, until being resurrected by ragtime pianist Tom Brier. Brier described the piece as an "obscure" one, and a "personal favorite", going onto be recorded numerous times by Tom Brier, included in his 2006 studio album, Rewind, and by others who discovered the piece on the internet.

== Compositions ==
- The Mexican Rag (1912)
- Song of Othmi from "Forty Cottages" (1912)
- The Yellow Faun (1913), musical comedy
- Catiline, historical drama
- Beaux Esprits (1913)
- Lullaby (1914)
- Where? there! somewhere in France! (1917)
- Cassandra (1918)
- The Village Fair (1921)
- Serenade from "Col. Quince", violin solo (1922)
- If I Had Only Known (1922)
- Te Deum in F (1922)
- Child's Play: Ten Little Pieces (1922), for piano
- Six Orientals for the Piano (1922)
- Three Sketches for the Pianoforte (c.1922)
- The Brook (1922), sketches for piano
- The Hunt (1922), sketches for piano
- Sigh No More, Ladies (1922), set to words by Shakespeare
- Song Without Words (1922), piano melodies with accompaniment
- Get In Step (1922), Broadway musical comedy, libretto by W.A. Hanft
- The Colored Band (1924)
- Alleluia! Death is Conquered (1924)
- Lullabye (1939), choral music
