= Tregonwell =

Tregonwell is a surname of English origin.

== List of people with the surname ==
- Lewis Tregonwell (1758–1832), founder of Bournemouth
- John Tregonwell (died 1682), Member of Parliament for Corfe Castle
- John Tregonwell (died 1565), English jurist, a principal agent of Henry VIII and Thomas Cromwell

== See also ==
- Tregonwell Frampton (1641–12 March 1727), English racehorse trainer
- Tregonwell Academy
- Trégon
