= St Andrew's Church, Goldsworth Park =

St. Andrew's Church, Goldsworth Park
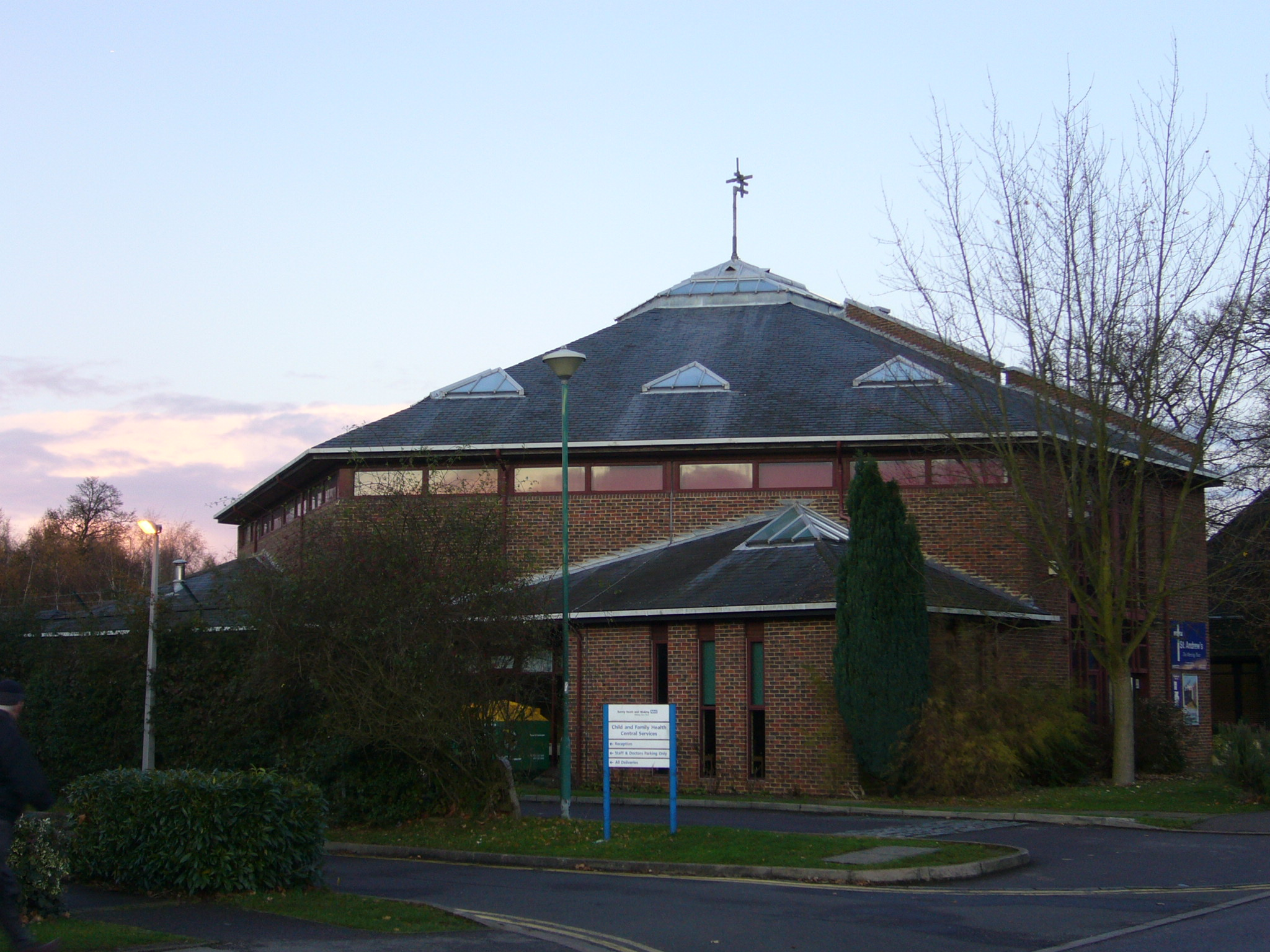
- St. Andrew's, Goldsworth Park
- St. Andrew's Church, Goldsworth Park
- 51.319°N 0.591°W
- Location: Goldsworth Park, Surrey
- Country: England
- Denomination: Church of England
- Website: http://www.standrewsgwp.org

History
- Dedicated: 1988

Architecture
- Architect: Robert Potter OBE
- Years built: 1988

Administration
- Diocese: Diocese of Guildford

St. Andrew's Church is the parish church of Goldsworth Park, a district of Woking, Surrey, England. The church paid for and sponsors the secular local youth and community centre for Goldsworth Park, the A2 Youth and Community Centre or simply, the A2 Centre.

== Building, clergy and style of worship ==
Part of the Diocese of Guildford, the first vicar was appointed in 1981, and the church met in local schools before moving into the church centre, designed by Robert Potter, in 1988. The building is part of Goldsworth Park Centre, adjacent to its shops and health centre.

The church describes itself as "a community-focused evangelical church, with a modern building".

The church's internet presence operates as a wider community website which has pages for its coffee shop, sponsored centre and initiatives.

== Linked amenities ==
=== A2 Youth & Community Centre ===
The church sponsored and opened this building adjacent to the church in 2008, providing youth facilities and venues for local community and social events.

== Parish ==
Goldsworth Park is a parish of the Church of England created to serve the Goldsworth Park estate which has diverse housing, parks, gardens and roads laid out on a sparsely populated greenfield area. The parish page on the church's web site states that Goldsworth Park was designed as a “garden estate”.

The parish is bounded by St John's and Woking to the south, and by Knaphill and Horsell to the west and north-east.

=== Parish history ===
From the Domesday Book of 1086 (and possibly earlier) until 1884, Goldsworth Park was part of the parish of Woking, which in 1848 "comprise[d] 10,000 acres [40 square kilometres (15 sq mi)] by computation". St John the Baptist Church, 'Goldsworth' built of stone in 13th-century style, was designed by George Gilbert Scott in 1842 (later knighted), and enlarged in 1879 and 1883, and in the year after what was considered St John's, Goldsworth gained the status of a parish.

In the 20th century the area around that church became widely known as St Johns and the large north-western portion of its area which broke off in 1988 to be the parish of the new church took up a variant of the old name of the district, chosen by the area's developers.

== See also ==
- Diocese of Guildford
- St John's, Woking
- Knaphill
- Horsell
