= St Francis's Church, Salisbury =

Coordinates: 51.0831°N 1.7965°W

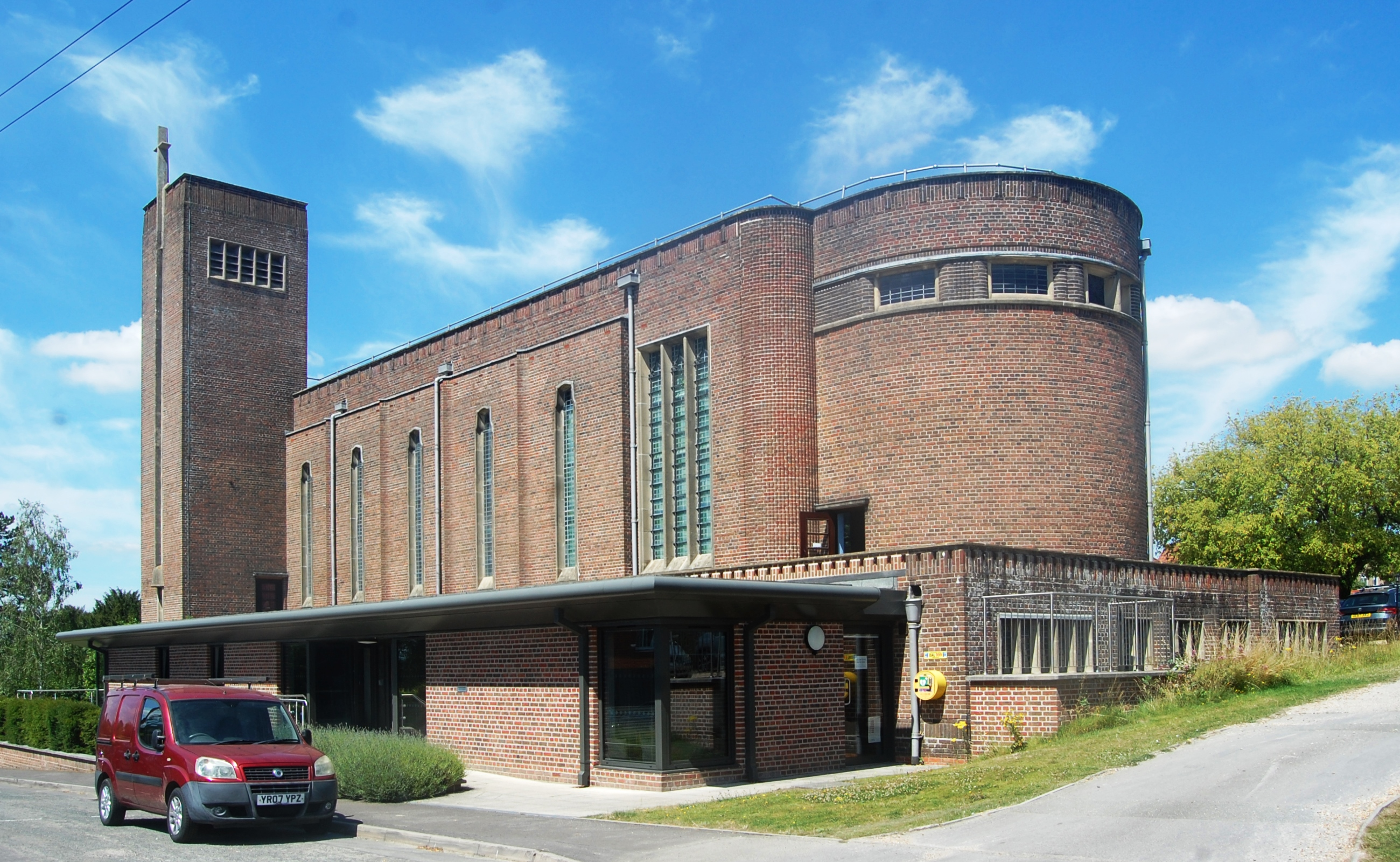
- The church in July 2022
- St Francis's Church, Salisbury
- OS grid reference: SU 14349 31549
- Location: 3 Beatrice Road, Salisbury, Wiltshire, SP1 3PN
- Country: England
- Denomination: Church of England
- Churchmanship: Evangelical
- Website: www.st-francischurch.org.uk

History
- Status: Active
- Founded: 1930
- Consecrated: 1940

Architecture
- Functional status: Parish church
- Heritage designation: Grade II listed
- Designated: 19 November 1990
- Architect: Robert Potter
- Completed: 1938

Administration
- Province: Canterbury
- Diocese: Salisbury
- Archdeaconry: Sarum
- Deanery: Salisbury
- Parish: Salisbury St Francis

St Francis Church, Salisbury is an evangelical, charismatic, Church of England parish church in the northern suburbs of Salisbury, Wiltshire, England, consecrated in 1940.

== History ==
A wooden ex-Army hut was used for worship from 1930, to serve the new residential area to the north of the city. By 1932, although the area was still part of Stratford-sub-Castle parish, a curate had been assigned to it. An ecclesiastical district was created in 1937 from parts of the parishes of Stratford-sub-Castle and St Mark, and a vicar was instituted. A site was found nearby on Castle Road (the A345) for a permanent church: the foundation stone was laid in January 1939, and the church was consecrated in 1940.

The building is in a 20th-century style, having a wide nave with passage aisles and meeting rooms, and an apsidal Lady Chapel behind the sanctuary, instead of a chancel. The tall nave windows have shaped heads. On the south side of the church is a tower, 70 feet (21 m) high. The building was designed by the architect Robert Potter. It is structurally concrete with brick cladding and infill, and artificial stone surrounds to the doors and windows. The roofs are of reinforced concrete covered with asphalt. The building was designated as Grade II listed in 1990. There was a major renovation in 2006. A single-storey flat-roofed extension, providing a new entrance, was added on the south side in 2017–2018.

Nikolaus Pevsner in the Buildings of England series notes that the building's details are similar to the work of Swedish architect Ragnar Östberg, and calls the white interior "quite impressive". Julian Orbach's updating of Pevsner's work compares the red brick to the power stations designed by Giles Gilbert Scott.

At first the church had no bells. One source states that by 1960 the bells of St Giles' in the evacuated village of Imber had been acquired, although another states that four of those had been sold for scrap and the fifth sent to Edington after they were removed from Imber in the 1950s.

The parish registers for christenings from 1930 and marriages from 1940, other than those in current use, are held in the Wiltshire and Swindon History Centre.

== Worship and activities ==
The church is affiliated to the Evangelical Alliance and the evangelical New Wine organisation. Services are designed to appeal to families and young people, and in 2013 the separate church hall was reconfigured as a community facility which also houses a pre-school.
