= Stanley Samuel Beare =

British GP and naval medical officer (1890–1978)

- Born: June 20, 1890; Newton Abbot, Devon, England
- Died: June 13, 1978 (aged 87); Weybridge, Surrey, England
- Other name: Sam Beare
- Education: Middlesex Hospital
- Occupations: General practitioner, surgeon, Royal Navy medical officer
- Awards: OBE (Military)

Stanley Samuel Beare (1890–1978) OBE, FRCS, widely known as Sam Beare, was a British doctor, surgeon, and Royal Navy medical officer who played a prominent role in community healthcare in Weybridge, Surrey, spanning several decades. The Woking and Sam Beare Hospice is named after him.

== Early life and World War I service ==
Beare was born in Newton Abbot, Devon, the son of Samuel Beare, an ironmonger and engineer, and Alice Austin Beer, whose father Henry was a journalist and Crimean War veteran. He was educated at Newton Abbot Grammar School and Strand School, King's College, London. He initially studied dentistry at the Middlesex Hospital, but subsequently switched to medicine, qualifying as surgeon (MRCS and LRCP) in 1914.

Following the outbreak of the First World War, Beare joined the Royal Navy as a medical officer, with the rank of surgeon-lieutenant . He served with the Auxiliary Patrol in Dover, overseeing the welfare of approximately 250 minesweepers and their crews. He saw active service during the Zeebrugge Raid in 1918, and was mentioned in dispatches by Admiral Sir Roger Keyes and later awarded the Military OBE. The citation reads

Surgeon-Lieutenant Stanley Samuel Beare. R.N. For valuable services in attending to the sick and wounded in the Dover Patrol.

Following the conclusion of his wartime service he left the Navy and returned to the Middlesex Hospital as a Resident Medical Officer where he practiced both surgery and anaesthetics.

== Medical career in Weybridge ==
In 1922, Beare moved to Weybridge, Surrey, where he became a GP, in partnership with Eric Gardner. Alongside routine medical procedures, they both handled a steady stream of trauma cases resulting from accidents at the nearby Brooklands motor racing circuit. This continued until the end of racing at Brooklands, in 1939.

During the Second World War, on 4 September 1940, German bombers targeted the nearby Vickers-Armstrong aircraft factory, killing 83 and injuring over 400. Weybridge Hospital was overwhelmed with civilian casualties. Beare and the hospital medical staff coordinated the emergency response, drawing high praise in subsequent Home Office reports.

== Later career ==
Beare was elected an honorary Fellow of the Royal College of Surgeons in 1947. He retired from general practice in 1956.

Later in his career, he returned to the Middlesex Hospital to serve as Honorary Curator of the Ferens Institute for Ear, Nose and Throat surgery (Now the UCL Ear Institute), and as Director of Medical Illustration. He also advised the North West Metropolitan Regional Hospital Board on cancer registration before retiring from medicine entirely in 1971.

== Personal life and legacy ==
He resided at Weybridge Park House Hanger Hill. He was a keen fisherman of trout and salmon and was swimming regularly into his eighties.

Beare married his first wife, Cecil, in 1920; she died in 1976. He later married Vivienne Maynard, who survived him. He died following a short illness in 1978.

His legacy is preserved through local healthcare institutions: the children's ward at the former Weybridge Hospital was named in his honour in 1962, His name is carried on by the Woking and Sam Beare Hospice, a palliative care charity serving the region.
