= Paul Higham =

English cricketer (born 1990)

Personal information
- Full name: Paul Sephton Higham
- Born: 20 August 1990 (age 36); Hammersmith, London, England
- Height: 6 ft 0 in (1.83 m)
- Batting: Right-handed
- Bowling: Right-arm medium

Domestic team information
- Years: Team
- 2011: Oxford University

Career statistics
Competition	First-class
Matches	1
Runs scored	14
Batting average	14.00
100s/50s	–/–
Top score	14
Balls bowled	180
Wickets	3
Bowling average	25.33
5 wickets in innings	–
10 wickets in match	–
Best bowling	3/36
Catches/stumpings	–/–
- Source: Cricinfo, 9 May 2020

Paul Sephton Higham (born 20 August 1990) is an English former first-class cricketer.

Higham was born at Hammersmith in August 1990. He was educated at Poole Grammar School, before going up to Pembroke College, Oxford. While studying at Oxford, he made a single appearance in first-class cricket for Oxford University against Cambridge University in The University Match of 2011 at Fenner's. Playing as a right-arm medium pace bowler, Higham took 3 wickets for 36 runs in the Cambridge second innings, having bowled sixteen wicketless overs in their first innings which conceded 40 runs. He batted twice in the match, ending the Oxford first innings unbeaten without scoring at number eleven, while in their second innings he was dismissed for 14 runs by Frankie Brown. Higham later studied for his master's at Imperial College London.
