= Goldsworth Park =

Coordinates: 51.317765°N 0.580444°W

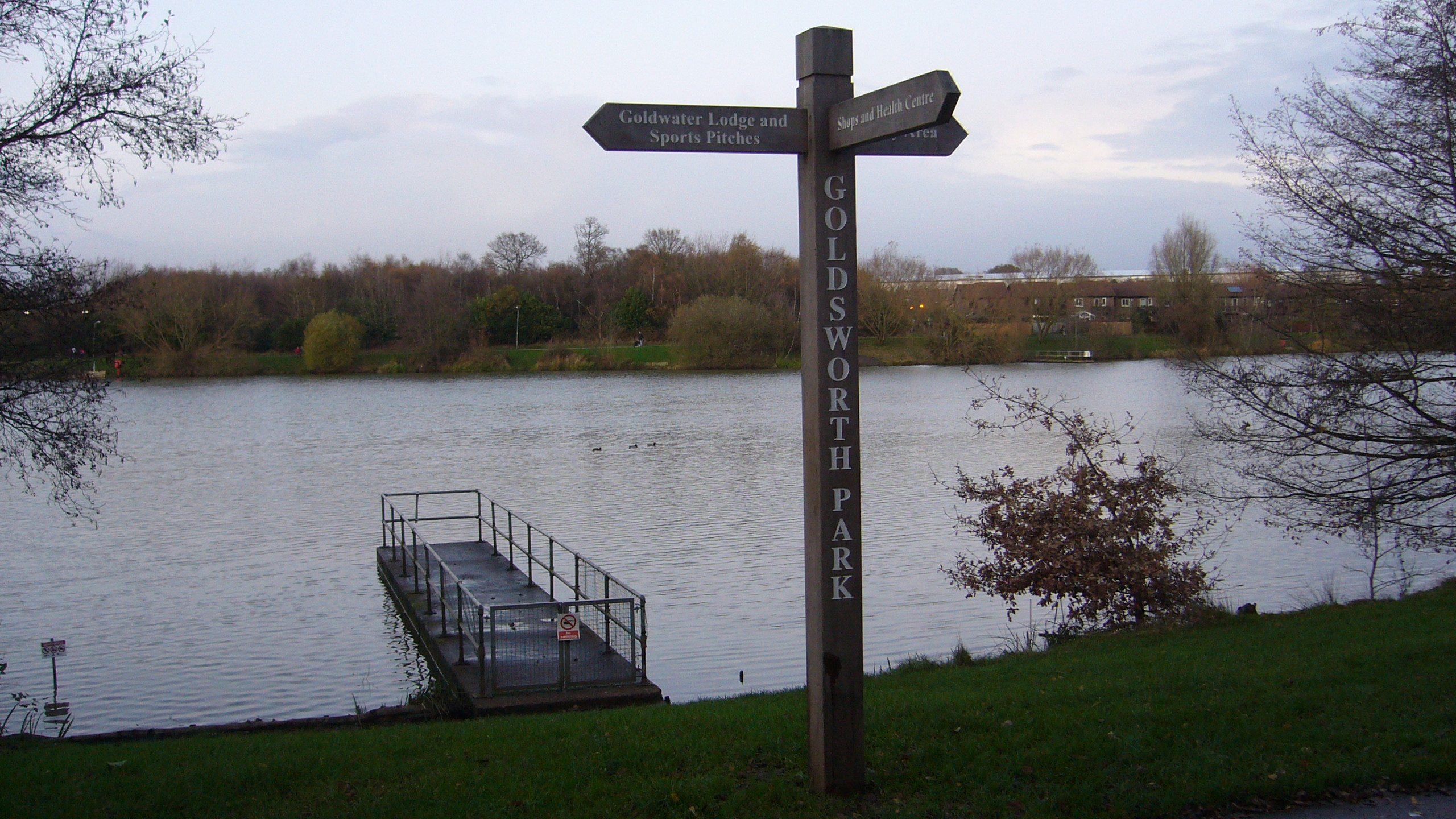
- The lake

- Location within Surrey
- Population: 12,000 approx
- OS grid reference: SU990585
- District: Woking
- Shire county: Surrey
- Region: South East
- Country: England
- Sovereign state: United Kingdom
- Post town: WOKING
- Postcode district: GU21
- Dialling code: 01483
- Police: Surrey
- Fire: Surrey
- Ambulance: South East Coast
- UK Parliament: Woking

Goldsworth Park is a large housing estate to the north-west of Woking in Surrey, England. It was named after the nearby Goldsworth area which was a large 'tithing' of Woking Parish. The tithing included most of the north west of Woking, such as Brookwood, Knaphill and St. John's. It is bordered by villages such as St. John's, Knaphill and Horsell.

It equates to the Church of England parish of Goldsworth Park: its parish church is St Andrew's, whose parish web page states that Goldsworth Park was designed as a 'garden estate'.

== History ==
=== Early history ===
Thousands of flint tools were found in the 1920s-1930s, on what was later to become the Goldsworth Park playing fields. These were probably left by a small group of people, settled in the valley of Parley Brook (though there may be a small chance that the actual original location may have been somewhere else, if they had been moved by glacial ice).

The name Goldsworth was first recorded in 1229 and is possibly derived possibly from 'la Goldhord' that may record a find of gold coins. Goldsworth then was a few houses in the area where Goldsworth Road is now, but also gave its name to the tithing of Goldsworth (sometimes called Goldings) which covers most of the north-west of Woking Parish.

Long Lane Cottage which is now in Clifton Way, Goldsworth Park and Langman's which is now in Langman's Lane, Goldsworth are both thought to have been built in the 16th century. They are now Grade II listed buildings and are timber framed.

In 1760, James Turner bought from the Earl of Onslow, owner of Woking Manor, some land in the "Tithing of Goldings". Then in 1790, James Turner on his land in the "Tithing of Goldings" started a nursery south of the canal near Langmans; he later passed it on to John Slyfield. It was later passed it to a member of the Jackman family, who in the early 19th century passed it onto Robert Donald and it then became known as Goldsworth Nursery. In the 1830s it was passed to a partnership consisting of William Chandler, Charles Waterer and George Jackman. 1877 saw the partnership selling to Walter Charles Slocock who, in time, expands the nursery by buying land to the north.

Goldsworth (Langmans) Bridge was built in 1790; it is a brick bridge over the Basingstoke Canal and is now listed as a National Scheduled Ancient Monument. Goldsworth Road was built in 1836.

In 1894, Woking Local Board formed, first met in Goldsworth Hall with 18 councillors representing these wards, Knaphill, St Johns, Mayford, Sutton, Brookwood, Old Woking, Maybury and Central.

The Nursery Staff that died during the First World War are remembered on the Goldsworth Nursery War Memorial

=== Estate starts in 1960s ===
A plan in 1964 foresaw a population of 97,000 of the Woking area by 1981 and proposed building 3 new housing schemes, one of which was known as 'Slococks', to be built on nurserylands owned by the Slococks which was the Goldsworth Nursery. So in 1967, a master plan decided that the Land Commission should buy the land and drain and service the site then sell it to developers. However, in 1970, the Land Commission was abolished by the Conservative Government; New Ideal Homes and Woking Borough Council agree to a partnership to build 'Slococks'. At this time, houses in the Mead Court area were built and therefore are not part of Goldsworth Park, they were a separate development.

The Goldsworth Park project was approved by the government in 1973 with work starting in Goldsworth Vale (phase one was Wilders Close etc.). The plan was to build 4,500 homes for 15,000 residents. It also planned for a lake, sports facilities, golf course, shops, swimming-pool, library, industrial estate, youth centres, pubs, churches, fire station and social facilities. The first house was completed in 1974. Three years later the Goldsworth Park Residents' Association Allotments Society formed (now called the Goldsworth Park Allotments Society). It commenced with 70 plots. However, in 1995 they had to move to a new 90-plot site at Brookwood. The soil at the old site was deemed to be unsafe.

By 1978, about 1,000 homes were completed. In the same year the Goldsworth Park Scout and Guides started at local schools. York Road doctor's practise opened in 1979 a second premises on Goldsworth Park.

The first parish Vicar of St Andrews Church Goldsworth Park was appointed in 1981. The church did not at the time have a building and services were held in Beaufort School and Sythwood School. The shops came in 1982 and the Bitterne Drive houses were also started in 1982. Three years later the Goldsworth Park Health Centre opened.

In 1988, the Goldwater Lodge and St Andrews Church were built. At this stage, about 3,000 homes were completed. The last homes were built in the 1990s

Fields Car Centre moves to Goldsworth Road in 1991. Trident Garages opened a branch in Goldsworth Road the same year. 1994 saw Goldsworth School moved location to Bridge Barn Lane from Kingsway.

1999 saw a change in the wards with Goldsworth Park Ward being split into two wards Goldsworth West and East. Goldsworth East gained extra areas around Goldsworth Road and Woking Town Centre.

In 2000, Goldsworth Care was launched. The next year, C+A closed its Swiftflow distribution depot on Goldsworth Park Trading Estate and Trident Garages sold its branch in Goldsworth Road to Majestic Wine. Arriva's Woking (Goldsworth Park Trading Estate) bus garage closed in 2002. The next year a new bigger building is built on the site of the old C+A warehouse in Kestrel Way. It is now a large high-security computer datacentre owned by Digital Reality Real Estate, with equipment space and facilities for rent.

St Andrew's Church opened its A2 Youth & Community Centre in 2008, providing youth facilities and venues for local community and social events. The A2 is located adjacent to the church centre.

In August 2011 Woking Borough Council opened a new site for the Woking Sea Cadets in Goldsworth park beside the lake. The building somewhat resembles a ship in form and is referred to as Training Ship Dianthus Building. The Dianthus Trading Company also promotes the use of the Dianthus building by community groups including local schools, youth groups, clubs & societies. The facilities are available for private functions and corporate business Events. It is also an emergency facility for Woking Borough Council.

The Goldwater Lodge burnt down in 2012. Arson was suspected. The building was subsequently rebuilt with the Community Hall being the final part reopening in April 2015.

== Facilities ==
Some of the facilities and infrastructures include: Parkside Dental Centre, Woking and Sam Beare Hospice, shops, mobile library, community hall, children's play centre, pub, health centre, St. Andrew's Church (with its A2 Youth & Community Centre), Lakers Youth Centre, Waitrose supermarket, garage, lake, recreation grounds, field hockey pitch, football pitch, cricket pitch, offices, trading estate, chemist, hairdressers, scout and Guide hall, canal, recycling facilities, children's playgrounds, basketball court, skateboard area, skateboard ramp.

== Election results ==
2002 elections for some Woking Borough Council wards.

- Goldsworth West 22% of 3816 voters= Landon 485 LD (Elected) Lawrence 266 CON Wand 83 LAB.
- Goldsworth East 29.7% of 5418 voters= Bellord 488 CON Cross 797 LD (Elected) Ford 316 LAB.

2003 elections for some Woking Borough Council wards.

- Goldsworth East 25.8% of 5426 voters= Yates 457 (CON) Smith 727 (LD - Elected) Martin 210 (LAB).

== Sport ==
Goldsworth Park is home to local football club Goldsworth Park Rangers who play at Goldsworth Park Recreation Ground.

Goldsworth Park Angling Club, established 2015, manages angling at Goldsworth Park Lake and Brookwood Ponds, under licence with Woking Borough Council.
