= Oakdale School, Poole =

Building in Dorset, England

Oakdale School
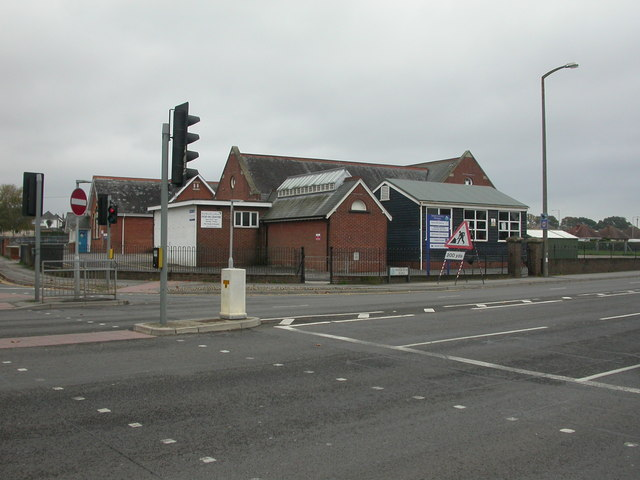
- Oakdale Pop-in Centre in 2008

Location
- Dorchester Road; Poole, Dorset; England; 50.732669°N 1.977045°W

Information
- Former names: Oakdale Council School; Oakdale Adult Learning Centre
- Established: 1906
- Status: Pending demolition
- Closed: 1997
- Local authority: Borough of Poole
- Authority: Bournemouth, Christchurch and Poole Council

Oakdale School was an educational building in Oakdale, Poole in Dorset, England. The school was located at the junction of Wimborne and Dorchester Roads.

== History ==
=== Building ===
Oakdale School was opened in 1906 by Dorset County Council. The Oakdale Council School was operated by the local authority. The school closed in 1997 and was then used as a community centre operated by Oakdale Residents Community Association. The Oakdale Centre was the busiest site operated by the Skills and Learning service. In 2014, Poole Borough Council applied for planning permission tod demolish the community hall. In 2017, the Borough of Poole's draft Local Plan designated the site for possible future housing.

=== Redevelopment ===
In 2018, the Oakdale Adult Learning Centre was declared no longer fit for purpose. This was due to the condition of the building. In January 2019, BCP its redevelopment into housing. In 2020, Bournemouth, Christchurch and Poole Council announced plans to relocate the Oakdale Learning Centre to Poole town centre. The proposed move from its current site was debated considering its historic value and as a community asset. The building was vacated in 2021. The site was reportedly targeted by anti-social behaviour and vandalism. The new Adult Skills and Learning Campus opened at the Dolphin Shopping Centre. In 2025, the council opened consultation on the demolition of the building and extra-care housing development to be built in its place. The recreation park was said not to be impacted as part of the potential development. The building is in an area of brownfield site developments.

== See also ==
- List of schools in Bournemouth, Christchurch and Poole
