= Yasmin Kaashoek =

British volleyball player

Personal information
- Full name: Yasmin Frances Kaashoek
- Nickname: Yas
- Nationality: British
- Born: 3 March 1999 (age 27) Devizes, England, United Kingdom
- Home town: Bournemouth, England, United Kingdom
- Education: LeAF Studio
- Height: 1.83 m (6 ft 0 in)
- Weight: 66 kg (146 lb)
- Spike: 280 cm (110 in)
- Block: 265 cm (104 in)

Volleyball information
- Position: Opposite hitter
- Current club: (United Kingdom) Wessex Volleyball

National team
- Years: Team
- 2014–: England
- Updated on 12 July 2016

Yasmin Frances Kaashoek (born 3 March 1999) is a British volleyball player, a member of the England women's national junior volleyball team and Wessex Volleyball Club, a competitor at the CEV U18 European Beach Volleyball Championships and Inaugural World U17 Beach Volleyball Championships where she alongside Anaya Evans became the first England duo to finish top-10 in an international competition.

== Personal life ==
Yasmin was born in Devizes to Hans Kaashoek. She has a younger brother aged fifteen who plays football in his school years.

== Career ==
Yasmin found volleyball and began playing for Devizes Volleyball from a young age. Her passion and talent grew and was noticed by coaches at regional training. Yasmin was selected to represent the South West in the Inter-Regional Competition which caught scouts’ eyes. Yasmin soon was further selected to train with the England Cadets well as the England Junior Beach Squad winning her first international caps months later. Yasmin moved to LeAF Elite Athlete Academy to join the volleyball programme alongside other national junior greats.

=== National championships ===
- 2015/2016 Volleyball England National U18 Indoor Volleyball Championship, with Wessex LeAF Volleyball
- 2015/2016 Volleyball England National U18 Grand Prix, with Wessex LeAF Volleyball

=== National team ===
- NEVZA U17 Indoor Volleyball Championships
- NEZVA U19 Indoor Volleyball Championships
- World U17 Beach Volleyball Championships
- CEV U18 European Beach Volleyball Championships

=== Individually ===
- 2014 Super 6 at the Sainsbury’s School Games
