= Wey Valley Academy =

Location
- Dorchester Road; Weymouth, Dorset, DT3 5AN; England
- Coordinates: 50°38′35″N 2°28′08″W

Information
- Type: Academy
- Motto: Inspire and Edge
- Local authority: Dorset Council
- Trust: Ambitions Academies Trust
- Department for Education URN: 147291 Tables
- Ofsted: Reports
- Gender: Coeducational
- Age: 11 to 16
- Enrolment: 800
- Website: http://weyvalley-academy.co.uk/

Wey Valley Academy was a coeducational secondary school with academy status in Broadwey, Weymouth, in the county of Dorset, in southern England.

The school was a member of the Chesil Education Partnership . In June 2019 the school joined the Ambitions Academies Trust.

As a specialist sports college the school offered a wide sporting curriculum and held the responsibility of leading the west Dorset School Sports Partnership. The school was also highly involved in outdoor education and runs many trips and activities and is a key contributor to Leading Edge Expeditions linked to the Dorset Expeditionary Society.

== History ==
For two decades the school had a history of under-achievement, and has struggled to do its best for the students, aiming to improve the results. It left the protection of the LEA in 2010 and attempted to succeed as an academy with its head teacher Alfie Fowler and then later on Jasper Allen Denton, it sought advice from the Ambitions Academies Trust, the multi-academy trust but hadn't the capacity to implement it. In 2019 it was placed in Special Measures, closed and reopened as a Ambitions Academies Trust academy – it was thus exempt from inspection for three years.

Looking back a decade, the school results (Level 2 threshold or more commonly known as 5 A*-C) had been variable but improving since 2005.

2003 46% 2004 49% 2005 47% 2006 48% 2007 49% 2008 50% 2009 63%

=== National challenge school ===
A second measure was introduced in 2006 which saw school performance also measured against 5 A*-C grades including English and mathematics. The achievement tables for 2009 show the trend since this started with the school dropping below 30% in 2007 and thus being identified as National Challenge. It has moved back above that threshold in 2008 and continued further in 2009 with 44%.

The National Challenge was launched by the Secretary of State on 10 June 2008. It is a programme of support to secure higher standards in all secondary schools so that by 2011, at least 30 per cent of pupils will gain five or more GCSEs at A* to C including both English and mathematics. Wey Valley is one of three Dorset schools to be part of National Challenge. The school was identified on the basis of a new performance measure in 2007, with 27% of students achieving 5 A* to C passes including English and maths. However, it successfully met this target in 2008 and improved significantly to 44% in 2009. Various strategies have been employed by the school to target improvement including accessing coaching from the leader of an outstanding school in the area in order to improve the likelihood of the school meeting the Government's targets. Consultancy support was also accessed from within the county to support developments in maths, English and with attendance.

=== Academy ===
The school's Ofsted report, prior to academy conversion in 2010, demonstrated improving performance with a headline comment that the school was "A good and rapidly improving school with some outstanding features". One of the outstanding areas was student care and guidance. In 2008 and 2009, 97% of all students had achieved at least 5 A*-G passes at GCSE or equivalent. The overall A* to C pass rate from 2009 placed the school fifth from bottom in the county, an improvement from second from bottom the previous year.

The performing arts department performed musical productions at Weymouth Pavilion, including Mack and Mabel in 2009. Head of Drama, Margot Stanley, was awarded a National Teaching Award for regional secondary teacher of the year in 2005.

== Description ==
Wey Valley has been under intense scrutiny in recent years, and now offers both academic and vocational paths. It offers the full national curriculum entitlement with a three-year Key Stage 3 and a two-year Key Stage 4.
