= Tom Brier =

American ragtime composer and pianist

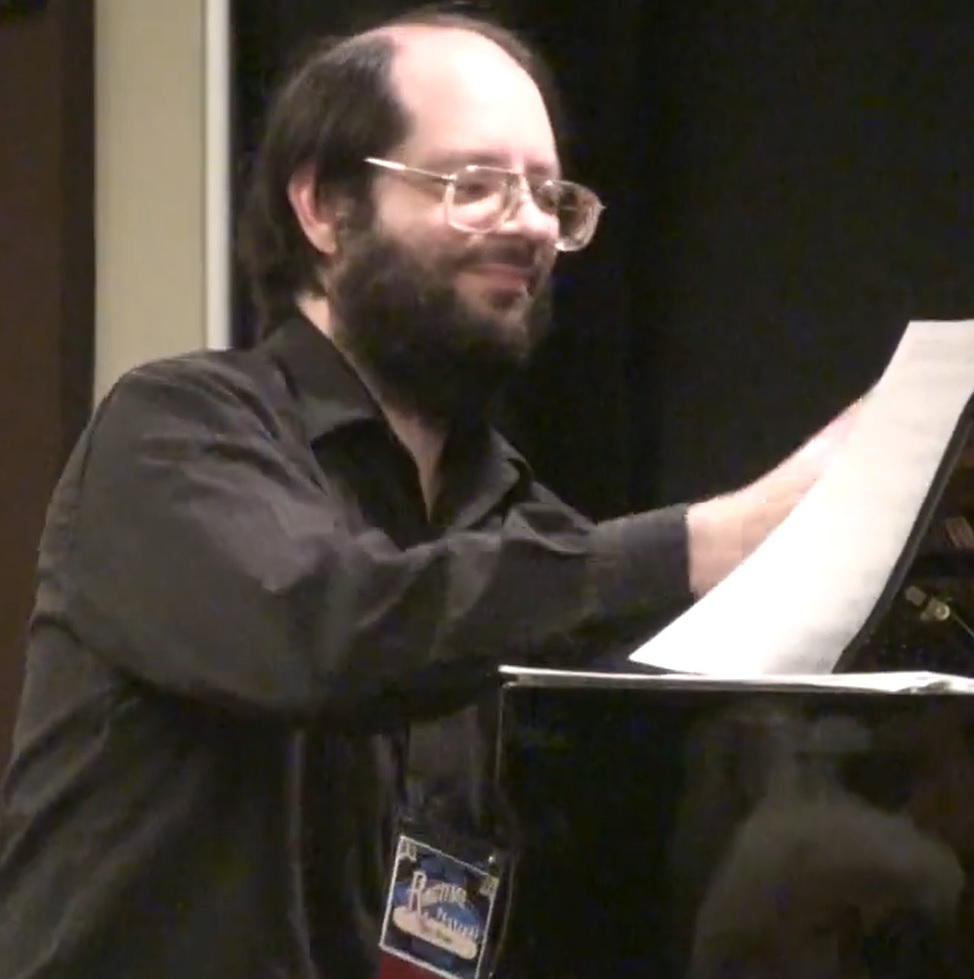
- Tom Brier in 2013

Background information
- Born: October 3, 1971 (age 55); Oakdale, California, U.S.
- Genre: Ragtime
- Occupations: Musician, composer
- Instrument: Piano
- Labels: Stomp Off, BaySounds Records
- Website: tom-brier.com

Tom Brier (born October 3, 1971) is an American ragtime composer and pianist.

== Early life and career ==
Tom Brier was born in Oakdale, California on October 3, 1971. Recognized as a child prodigy, Brier began picking out tunes on the family player piano at age 5. By the age of 11, he had written the scores to nearly two dozen ragtime compositions; his first serious piece being "Pine Cone Rag" (1982). At 14, Brier was performing at ragtime societies and festivals in the Sacramento area. After High School, Brier studied computer science at California State University in Turlock, California, graduating in 1993 with a bachelor's degree. He then went on to work for the county of Sacramento as a programmer and analyst. From age 14 until 2016, Brier performed regularly at ragtime festivals, including the West Coast Ragtime Festival, Santa Cruz Ragtime Festival, the Scott Joplin Ragtime Festival in Sedalia, Missouri, Historic Sutter Creek Ragtime Festival, among others. Having written over 200 piano compositions, Brier's most popular and well-known work is "Razor Blades".

Recordings of "Borneo Rag" and "Indian Summer", performed by Nan Bostick and Tom Brier, were featured in the 2005 biographical documentary Unforgivable Blackness: The Rise and Fall of Jack Johnson by filmmaker Ken Burns. He is listed as a musical influence on soundtrack for the 2017 videogame Cuphead. In 2023, Brier received the Ragtime Outstanding Achievement Award from the Scott Joplin International Ragtime Foundation. The Tom Brier Scholarship is awarded annually at the Historic Sutter Creek Ragtime Festival in his honor.

== YouTube ==
In the late 2000s, Brier gained fame on YouTube and within the gaming community for his sight-reading performances and "Brier-ized" cover versions of known video game themes. These cover versions were posted by "online ragtime enthusiast", and friend, Ron O'Dell. Brier's ragtime versions of popular songs from video game soundtracks such as Super Mario and The Legend of Zelda garnered a fan base following and millions of views.

== Car accident ==
On August 6, 2016, Brier was involved in a car accident that left him severely injured. Suffering from a brain injury that caused paralysis from the neck down, Brier was unable to "write, walk, speak or play the piano". After being in a coma for over two months, he spent several years in neuro & physical therapy and lives, as of 2023, with his parents in Oakdale, California. In the years following his accident, biographical videos documenting Brier's career were posted on video sharing platforms with updates on his condition and music. Brier has slowly been regaining the ability to write, when he signed items for the 2023 Scott Joplin International Ragtime Festival.

== Selected compositions ==
- Blackberry Fox Trot (2004)
- Blue Lampshade (2003)
- Blue Sahara (2009)
- Breadline Blues (2001)
- Brier Patch Rag (1991)
- Carmine (2010)
- Corn Chowder (2009)
- Cookie-Cutter Rag (2008)
- Delphinium Rag (2011)
- Elephant Tracks (2004)
- Esmeralda (Fox Trot) (2009)
- Front Porch Rag (2000)
- Fumble Fingers (2001)
- Goldeneye Rag (1999)
- Hardscrabble – Two Step (2013)
- Humming Bird Rag (1988)
- Imperial Fox Trot (2001)
- Juniper Rag (1991)
- Just Peachy (1992)
- Lucky Me (1997)
- Millennium Rag (1994)
- New Wave Rag (1995)
- No Foolin' (2006)
- Old Hickory (2000)
- One Too Many (1996)
- Over The Top (1994)
- Partytime Rag (1987)
- Parallelograms (2006)
- Peril in Pantomime (2008)
- Pratfalls (1998)
- Ragging To Sacramento (1987)
- Razor Blades (1994)
- Redneck Rag (2008)
- Rhythmodik (2004)
- Rubber Band Rag – It's a Snap! (1991)
- Skipping Along (1998)
- Skunk Hollow Rag (2001)
- Spasmodic (2005)
- Squish It (Fox Trot) (1997)
- Step It Up (2006)
- Sunlight and Shadow (1998)
- Tarnation (2015)
- The Oakdale Tickler (1988)
- Thorns and Thistles – A Sharp Rag (1992)
- Vim and Vigor (2016)
- Watch Your Step (2012)
- Wellington Rag (1991)
- Y-Knot (2005)
- You Said It (2006)

== Discography ==
- Rising Star (1994)
- Generic (1997)
- Pianola (2000)
- Dualing at the McCoys (with Nan Bostick, 2003)
- Skeletons (2003)
- Rewind (2006)
- Missing You at the McCoys (with Nan Bostick, 2006)
- Blue Sahara (2009)
- Constellations (2012)
- Tom Brier – Live in Concert (2015)

+ with other artists

- Raspberries To Crow About (2009)
- Ragtime Wizardry (Various Artists, Tom Brier, 2014)
- Raspberries in the Briar Patch (2015)
- Ragtime Wizardry: Volume 2 (Various Artists, Tom Brier, 2019)
