= Poole Grammar School =

Location
- Gravel Hill; Poole, Dorset, BH17 9JU; England; 50°45′16″N 1°58′49″W

Information
- Type: 11–18 boys Academy grammar school
- Motto: "Finis Opus Coronat" (Latin) "The End Crowns the Work"
- Established: 1904
- Local authority: Bournemouth, Christchurch and Poole
- Department for Education URN: 136850 Tables
- Ofsted: Reports
- Headteacher: Katie Etheridge
- Staff: ~60 teachers
- Gender: Boys
- Age: 11 to 18
- Enrolment: 1250
- Colour
Scarf
- Affiliations: South West Academic Trust (SWAT)
- Former pupils: Old Grammarians
- Website: http://www.poolegrammar.com

Poole Grammar School (commonly abbreviated to PGS) is an 11–18 selective boys grammar school and academy in the coastal town of Poole in Dorset, in the south of England. The school is twinned with Parkstone Grammar School. It is a member of the South West Academic Trust (SWAT). The school was a mathematics and computing school, with an additional specialism, cognition, added in 2006.

Poole Grammar School is situated in the north of Poole, on the A349 (known locally as Gravel Hill), in a campus built in 1966, with various additions made since.

== History ==
=== The Early School ===
An early Poole Grammar School was built in 1628 by Thomas Robarts, Mayor of Poole. This school taught “Latin grammar and kindred subjects”. The establishment of the free school is commemorated in St James' Church, Poole and saw moderate success in the 18th century, before a decline against “competition from nonconformist academies and the general economic decline of the town,” and eventual closure in 1835.

=== Poole Technical School ===
In 1902 the Board of Education approved funding for the construction of Poole Technical and Commercial School, offering “an education of a practical character for boys and girls of twelve years of age and upwards.” On 19 September 1904, following legal disputes between Poole Borough Council, Dorset County Council, and the Board of Education, on the interpretation of the Education Act 1902, the establishment of Poole Secondary School was reported by the Poole, Parkstone, and East Dorset Herald. Within its first two months of existence, Poole Secondary School was granted two acres of land at Seldown by Lord Wimborne. The school began in the Poole Free Library, which is now a Wetherspoons pub, called the Lord Wimborne. In 1907 the school's original site was built on this land for £6,500, to mixed reaction with some councillors regarding it as “squat”, but the Poole, Parkstone, and East Dorset Herald describing it as “one of the finest buildings in the town.” PGS stayed at the Seldown site until 1966, however the original buildings continued as the Seldown School until their demolition in 1986.

At this time, too, the first headmaster, A. J. Mockridge, was appointed, and around this time the current school colours were adopted. In 1909 a pupil of the school, Tim Aitken, participated in the first of Baden Powell's Scout camps on Brownsea Island.

=== Grammar School Status ===
“The immediate post war years also saw [Poole Secondary School] breach one of the last bastions of elite education when, in successive years, the first girl and then the first boy went to Oxford University.” In 1927 Poole Secondary School was elevated to Grammar School status, following the Hadow reports. The 1930s were considered the school's "golden age", and in 1933 Poole Grammar School had the highest distinctions in French in England (3); two of the seventeen art distinctions awarded that year; and nine in history – "twice as many as any school in England". The school would go on to achieve the highest number of history distinctions in the country for two more successive years. In 1938 Poole Grammar had the highest number of School Certificate passes in the country, with an average pass rate of 87% during the late thirties, when the average grammar school pass rate was 60%.

In 1933 the Bournemouth Echo reported a governors meeting at Parkstone Grammar School decided that “Parkstone Grammar School should… become A School for Girls, and Poole Grammar School a School for Boys.” This division was disliked by the then student body, with the debating society passing ‘This House Believes that Co-Education is the Best Education’ by 97 votes to 15. This started the separation of boys and girls which is still in effect today. The two grammar schools have very close links as they are only around half a mile (0.8 km) apart. They share certain social activities, drama performances and a number of sixth form subjects including languages and, until 2022, ancient history.

=== 1945-Present ===
Following the second world war Poole Grammar School admissions were solely boys who had passed the 11+, with the Education Act 1944 ending fee paying students. In 1960 Poole Grammar School's current location between Broadstone and Canford Heath on the A349 (Gravel Hill) was identified as a countryside site for the much-needed expansion in size of the school. The original Seldown site is now a car park and National Express Coach pick up point. Work began on 30 April 1964 and the buildings were ceremonially opened by Princess Margaret on 11 October 1966. During this period Poole Grammar School was celebrated by the Sunday Times and in the House of Commons as an example of the success of the grammar school system, particularly because of the school's success at Balliol College, Oxford, where it was only beaten in successful applications “by a handful of major public schools.” This success was not insignificant: Twenty-three places between 1950 and 1962.

A fire in 1971 caused £5,000 worth of damage to the school.

Between 2006 and 2009 the Ashley Thorne Building (named after a former and long serving governor of the school) was built to house the music and drama departments, as well as a new library. The latter has since been converted into Sixth Form study space and the library moved to its previous position in the school.

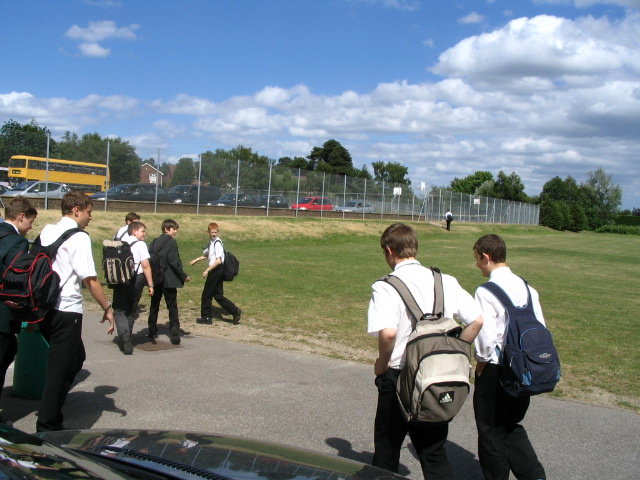
"Poole Grammar School students "

== Overview ==
=== Admissions ===
The school has accepted students from the age of 11 (Year 7) since 2013 after a large-scale change to the structure of schooling in Poole.

Applicants to Year 7 must sit an entrance exam (the 11+) in the autumn term of Year 6 to prove that they are of grammar school standard. The same entrance exam is used by Bournemouth School, Bournemouth School for Girls and Parkstone Grammar School.

Poole Grammar School admits 180 students into Year 7 on 1 September of each academic year. Students are placed into one of six tutor groups, each comprising 30 students.

Up to 30 external students are admitted each year into Year 12 of the school's Sixth Form.

=== School Uniform ===
A representation of the three ties worn by students at Poole Grammar School.

Poole Grammar School students in Years 7–11 wear a uniform of green blazer, white shirt and dark grey or black trousers.

Since the beginning of the academic year commencing September 2024, Sixth Form Students have not needed to wear a uniform, a significant contrast with previous years when smart business attire was required.

All students are required to wear coloured lanyards with ID cards which correspond to the year they are in.

For physical education (PE) lessons students are expected to wear Joma's green and black PE shirt, along with black shorts (either own or Joma branded), either white or black socks and trainers. Additionally, Joma released a black sports jacket with the school's logo on it and a backpack.

For games lessons, the school have released a reversible jersey made of the same material as the PE shirt, but with green and yellow stripes. This can be accompanied with the same attire as the PE shirt, and boys are requested to wear gum shields and shin pads when necessary.

When attending science classes or certain design technology classes the boys are expected to bring a white lab coat.

=== Curriculum subjects ===
Poole Grammar School students must study GCSEs in either double or triple science (biology, chemistry and physics), English language and literature, mathematics, and religion & philosophy. The school also offers optional GCSEs in art (fine), art (3D design graphics), computer science, design technology, drama, electronics, food technology, geography, history, modern foreign languages (French and Spanish), music and physical education (PE).

Students in Poole Grammar School Sixth Form are expected to study at least three A-levels and an additional qualification. Currently the choice of additional qualification includes the level 3 Extended Project Qualification (EPQ), further mathematics at AS or A-level or level 3 core mathematics.

A-Levels available at Poole Grammar School Sixth Form include: art (fine), art (3D design graphics), biology, business, chemistry, computer science, design technology, drama, economics, electronics, English language, English literature, French, geography, German, government & politics, history, media studies, music, physics, psychology, philosophy, Spanish and sociology.

Some A-level subjects are offered in partnership with Parkstone Grammar School (drama, English language, French, German, media studies, Spanish and sociology).

Two new A-levels are being introduced: physical education from September 2025 and environmental science from September 2026.

=== Sporting subjects ===
Sport is a major part of life at Poole Grammar School. The school owns large playing fields adjacent to the main buildings. They are used as football and rugby pitches, with two overlapping cricket fields and as a running track during the summer. Students also play sports on the school playground. The two large gyms provide changing facilities, a climbing wall, indoor volleyball courts and a room for weights and fitness training. The school boasts two astroturf tennis courts, installed in 2008 and a multi-use games area (MUGA) was installed in 2010. In 2021 Poole Grammar School was granted £3.8 million from the UK Government to build new sports facilities. The new Sports Centre opened in September 2023.

The new sports center includes a gymnasium with basketball hoops, cricket nets and various sports equipment in storage, a fully functional rope climbing wall, a well-equipped gym with rowing machines, cycle machines and weightlifting equipment, and 5 state-of-the-art classrooms that are used for various subjects.

In 2022 Poole Grammar School's under 15s rugby side reached the finals of the national schools rugby, beating Dr. Challoner's Grammar School 22–12 in the semi-finals, and lost the national final 19–17 to Hill House School, Doncaster at the Saracen's Stadium at Barnet Copthall. Also in 2022 Poole Grammar School's inaugural croquet team beat Canford School.

Students partake in many sports throughout the year from football to tennis. During the winter term, students participate in rugby during their games lessons. During the spring term, they play football. In the summer term, students play a variety of games including cricket, tennis and softball. Most of these sports contain an inter-form tournament towards the end of the term. Students competing in cross country running train on Canford Heath during lunch hour.

== People ==
=== Headteachers ===
- Mr. John Dyson Esq. 1904-1906 (Chairman of Governors, no Headmaster yet appointed)
- Mr. G. E. Boyer, 1906–7
- Mr. Albert James Mockridge, 1907–1928
- Mr. Archibald Greenfield, 1928–1950
- Mr. Frank H. Stevens, 1950–1954
- Mr. John Cleave, 1954-1972 (after whom the school theatre is named)
- Mr. Nigel Gilpin, 1973-1990 (to whom the school's main hall is dedicated)
- Mr. Haydn Adams, 1990
- Mr. John Wheway, 1990
- Mr. Alex Clarke, 1990–2004
- Mr. Ian Carter, 2004–2014
- Mr. Andy Baker, 2014-2020
- Dr. Amanda Smith, 2020–2024
- Mrs. Katie Etheridge, 2024–present

=== Notable alumni ===
- Nick Aplin, a Senior Lecturer at the National Institute of Education (NIE).
- Edgar F. Codd, winner of the Turing Award for his invention of relational databases when at IBM's San Jose Research Laboratory in California
- Jim Cregan, musician
- Michael Joseph Crumpton FRS was Director of Research (Laboratories) for the Imperial Cancer Research Fund Laboratories (now part of Cancer Research UK)
- Prof Ronald P. Dore CBE
- John Finnemore, writer and actor
- Ant Henson, British singer-songwriter
- Paul Higham, cricketer
- Dave Lanning, sports commentator
- Richard Oakes, guitarist for the band Suede
- Harry Cornick, footballer with Luton Town
- Josh Carmichael, footballer with Weymouth
- Piers Copeland, Professional Athlete
- Jacob Peters, Professional Swimmer

== See also ==
- List of schools in Bournemouth, Christchurch and Poole
- List of grammar schools in England
