= Woking and Sam Beare Hospice =

Woking & Sam Beare Hospice
- Formation: 1996 (as Woking Hospice); 2017 (merged facility opened)
- Type: Registered Charity / Hospice
- Registration no.: 1082798 (Woking); 1115439 (Sam Beare)
- Headquarters: Goldsworth Park Centre; Woking, Surrey; GU21 3LG
- Coordinates: 51.3188°N 0.5907°W
- Services: Specialist palliative and end-of-life care
- Staff: ~200
- Volunteers: ~800
- Website: wsbh.org.uk

Woking & Sam Beare Hospice is a charity trust which provides palliative and end-of-life care across North West Surrey. The trust runs an in-patient traditional hospice as well as community nursing and in-home outpatient services.

== Origins and Merger ==
Two separate initiatives were independently launched in two neighbouring boroughs in Surrey: Woking and Weybridge.

=== Woking ===
The original Woking Hospice was founded in 1996 by Rhod Lofting who had personal experience of the challenges of getting end-of-life care when his own father had died of cancer in the 1960s. In 1990, when he became Mayor of Woking he launched a programme for a local hospice, and in 1995 a ten-bed care facility was opened on Hill View Road, Woking.

=== Weybridge ===
Weybridge hospital opened in 1928, and new facilities were developed at the site over the next forty years, including a children's ward named after Sam Beare, a prominent Weybridge GP and practitioner at the hospital. In 1977 Weybridge was visited by a Macmillan cancer relief team from Christchurch Hospital, Dorset, which was a pioneer in providing palliative care. This led to the conversion of the old children's ward to a six-bed palliative care ward called the Sam Beare Continuing Care Unit. Funding was a mixture of the NHS, and the National Society for Cancer Relief, later called the Macmillan Cancer Support.

In 1987, an additional unit called the Richard Jenner Day Unit was open to support patients and families. It was named after a fourteen-year-old boy who had died at his home in Weybridge in 1985 suffering from a rare form of bone cancer.

This officially became the Sam Beare Hospice in 1999. After being funded by the NHS from 1999 to 2005, the Weybridge site became a registered charity in June 2006.

=== Merger ===
Due to high operational costs and rents, the decision was made in 2014 to merge the Woking Hospice with the Sam Beare Hospice and to open a single, purpose-built facility. The Weybridge site closed in 2016, avoiding a subsequent fire that destroyed the building later that year. At the time the two hospices operated 10 beds each.

The joint facility was named Woking and Sam Beare Hospice to honour the two constituent organisations.

In December 2017, HRH The Countess of Wessex opened the new facility located in Goldsworth Park, Woking.

== Facilities ==
The Goldsworth Park site, created from a three-storey 1970s office block called Goldsworth House, was designed for inpatient care, therapy, and family support. The inpatient unit provides 20 private overnight en-suite rooms equipped with balconies capable of accommodating an additional bed so family members can stay overnight. Some of the rooms are sponsored by families and friends of people linked to the hospice, or companies based locally.

=== The Wellbeing Centre ===
The Wellbeing Centre is a communal space featuring a kitchen, dining area, and adjustable seating oriented toward a landscaped garden. The garden was designed by Chelsea Flower Show award-winner Charlotte Harris, and includes "The Retreat," a multi-faith prayer room.

=== SC Johnson Family Room ===
SC Johnson donated more than £100,000 to fund the construction and furnishing of a wood-clad curved family room. It is a place for visiting family members to use while visiting patients.

=== Additional facilities ===
Other facilities at the site include a physiotherapy suite to assist terminally ill patients with mobility and physical conditioning. In addition to the in-patient care at the main Woking facility, outpatient community care and administrative functions are supported across the region, including regional operations maintained via local bases such as Clive House in Weybridge.

== Patient Care ==
The hospice delivers care to around 800 patients in total, either in their own homes or in a care or nursing home. This includes specialist palliative and end-of-life care for adult patients with life-limiting or terminal conditions across six boroughs in North West Surrey (Woking, Runnymede, Elmbridge, Spelthorne, Guildford, and Surrey Heath). Access to services is managed via healthcare professional referrals.

=== Inpatient Care ===
Short-term specialist stays (with an average duration of approximately two weeks) focused on pain management, comfort, and end-of-life care.

=== Outpatient and Community Care ===
80% of care takes place in the community as the specialist nursing teams provide "Hospice at Home" care, supporting patients who wish to die in their own homes. This is often done alongside external organizations like Marie Curie and Princess Alice Hospice.

=== Day Care and Support Services ===
The Hospice provides therapies, social interaction, and wellbeing sessions during structured programmes several days a week. Comprehensive support is also extended to patients' families and carers, including funeral care assistance and bereavement counselling.

== Finance ==
The organization is a registered charity which relies on a combination of statutory health service funding and voluntary community support. Whilst the charity receives some funding from the NHS, it has to generate two-thirds of its income from fundraising.

In July 2025 as part of the Labour Government's plans to "transform" end-of-life care in the UK the Hospice, was allocated £481,630 for capital expenditure.

The organization employs roughly 200 paid clinical, administrative, and support staff, backed by about 800 volunteers who assist in areas ranging from therapy and patient transport to retail and café operations.

The Hospice runs a network of over a dozen retail shops across North West Surrey, along with an online store and charity bookshops (such as its award-winning branch in Weybridge). Retail operations raise approximately one third of the charitable income.

While receiving partial commissioning and funding from the NHS, the charity relies heavily on the sale of items from its shops, legacies and fundraising events (such as its annual Midnight Walk and London Marathon participation teams), to cover the majority of its operating expenses.

Local MP, Ben Spencer, paid tribute to the fundraising efforts for the Hospice in Parliament saying,

I pay tribute to everybody for what they do, no matter how big or small, to support our hospices and our palliative care sector.
