= Oakdale Township =

Oakdale Township may refer to:

- Oakdale Township, Washington County, Illinois
- Oakdale Township, Antelope County, Nebraska
