= Oakdale Joint Unified School District =

School district in California

Address
- 168 South Third Avenue Oakdale, California, 95361; United States

District information
- Type: Public
- Grades: K–12
- NCES District ID: 0600062

Students and staff
- Students: 5,282 (2020–2021)
- Teachers: 224.33 (FTE)
- Staff: 249.88 (FTE)
- Student–teacher ratio: 23.55:1

Other information
- Website: www.ojusd.org

The Oakdale Joint Unified School District serves approximately 5,173 students in Oakdale, California, United States. It was formed when the Oakdale Union Elementary School District and the Oakdale Joint Union High School District were merged on July 1, 1998. The current superintendent is Larry Mendonca.

== Schools ==
- Oakdale High School; mascot is the mustang.
- Oakdale Junior High School; mascot is the ram.
- East Stanislaus High School; mascot is the Knight.
- Cloverland Elementary School; mascot is the cougar.
- Fair Oaks Elementary School; mascot is the falcon.
- Magnolia Elementary School; mascot is the bear.
