= Church of the Ascension, Crownhill =

Church in Devon, England

Church of the Ascension
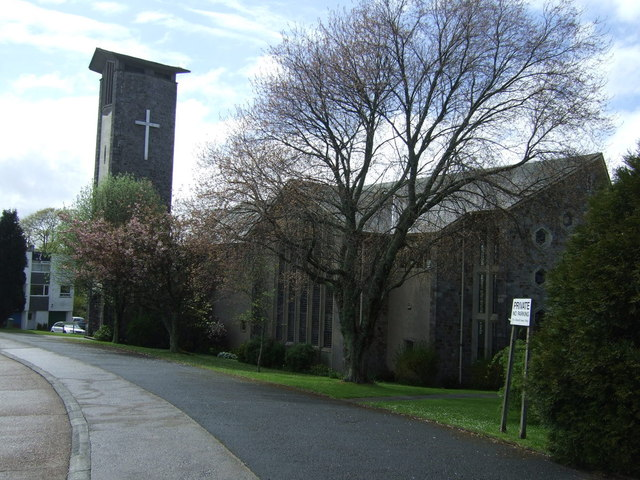
- Interactive map of the Church of the Ascension area

General information
- Location: Crownhill, Plymouth, United Kingdom
- Coordinates: 50.4048°N 4.1354°W
- Opened: 1958

Design and construction
- Architect: Robert Potter

The Church of the Ascension is a Grade II listed Church of England church in the suburb of Crownhill in Plymouth, Devon. It was designed by the architect Robert Potter and consecrated in 1958.
