= Oakdale High School =

Oakdale High School may refer to:

- Oakdale High School (Maryland) in Frederick, Maryland
- Oakdale High School (California) in Oakdale, California
- Oakdale High School (Louisiana) in Oakdale, Louisiana
- Oakdale High School (Tennessee) in Oakdale, Tennessee
