= Oakdale, California =

City in California, United States

- City
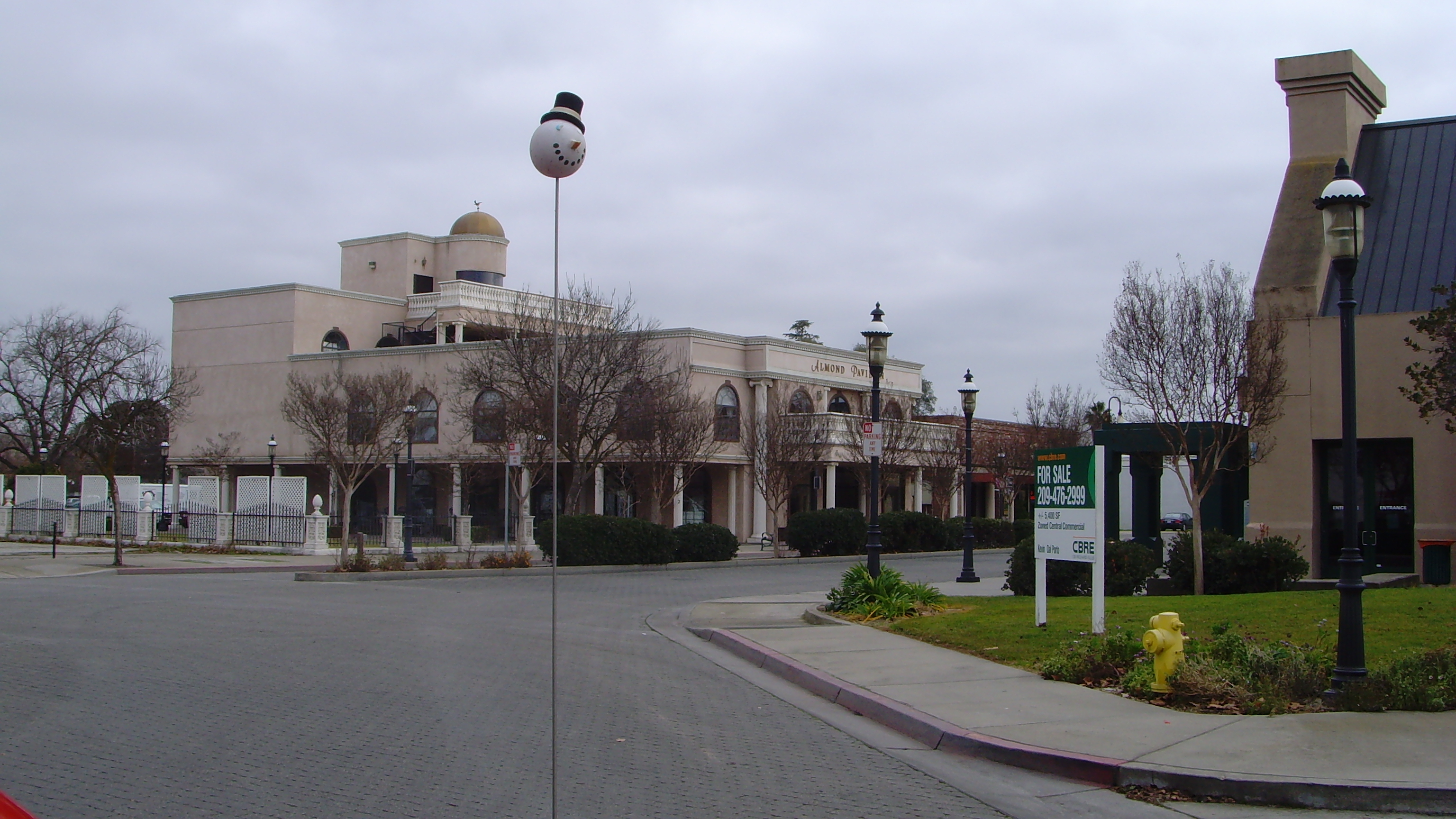
- South Sierra Avenue

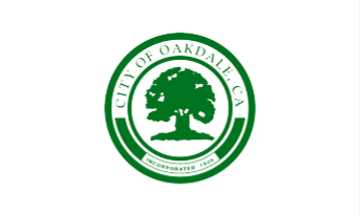
- Flag
- Mottoes: Cowboy Capital of the World; Home of the Mustangs
- Interactive map of Oakdale, California
- Location in the United States Oakdale (the United States)
- Coordinates: 37°46′9″N 120°51′25″W
- Country: United States
- State: California
- County: Stanislaus
- Incorporated: November 24, 1906

Area
  - Total: 6.26 sq mi (16.22 km^{2})
  - Land: 6.22 sq mi (16.12 km^{2})
  - Water: 0.039 sq mi (0.10 km^{2}) 0.62%
- Elevation: 157 ft (48 m)

Population (2020)
  - Total: 23,181
  - Density: 3,724/sq mi (1,438/km^{2})
- Time zone: UTC-8 (Pacific (PST))
  - Summer (DST): UTC-7 (PDT)
- ZIP code: 95361
- Area code: 209
- FIPS code: 06-52694
- GNIS feature ID: 0277564
- Website: oakdalegov.com

Oakdale is a city in the San Joaquin Valley and Stanislaus County, California, United States. As of 2020 census, its population was 23,181. It goes by the slogan "Cowboy Capital of the World."

== History ==
The city was founded in 1871 when the Stockton and Visalia Railroad met the Copperopolis Railroad. The site of Taylor's Ferry Crossing is located in Oakdale, a crossing of the Stanislaus River on the 19th century Stockton - Los Angeles Road.

Oakdale was used as a film location for the United Artists film Bound For Glory starring David Carradine. Oakdale doubled as a dusty 'Texas' town using railroad scenes for the film. Oakdale was nominated for an award for having the most almond trees per capita per square mile in the state of California.

In June 2020, the town was taken by a false rumor that Black Lives Matters protestors intended to invade the town from the Bay Area. The owner of a local bar, the H-B Saloon, hired an out-of-town militia, gunmen dressed in camouflage, to patrol the town while store windows were boarded up. The false rumor started on the local Facebook group for the town. A 2025 New York Times report on the town noted that the town had become a news desert, as local news outlets had for the most part disappeared while inhabitants increasingly relied on social media for information about their area.

== Geography ==
The city is located on the Stanislaus River in the east-central portion of the San Joaquin Valley, adjacent to the foothills of the Sierra Nevada. California State Routes 108 and 120 (Tioga Pass Road) intersect in the city.

According to the United States Census Bureau, the city has a total area of 6.3 square miles (16.2 km^{2}), of which 6.2 square miles (16.1 km^{2}) is land and 0.039 square miles (0.1 km^{2}) (0.62%) is water.

The National Weather Service has maintained a cooperative weather station at Woodward Dam for many years. In January, average temperatures are a maximum of 52.4 °F (11.3 °C) and a minimum of 35.1 °F (1.7 °C). In July, average temperatures are a maximum of 102.8 °F (39.3 °C) and a minimum of 58.4 °F (14.7 °C). The record high temperature was 114 °F (46 °C) on July 18, 1925. The record low temperature was 12 °F (−11 °C) on December 11, 1932. Annually, there are an average of 84.6 days with highs of 90 °F (32 °C) or higher and an average of 30.8 days with lows of 32 °F (0 °C) or lower.

Average annual rainfall is 13.33 inches (339 mm). There are an average of 44 days annually with measurable precipitation. The wettest year was 1958 with 22.15 inches (563 mm) and the driest year was 1947 with 7.99 inches (203 mm). The most rainfall in one month was 8.63 inches (219 mm) in January 1911. The most rainfall in 24 hours was 5.7 inches (140 mm) on April 3, 1958. The record snowfall was 1.5 inches (3.8 cm) in January 1930.

Climate data for Oakdale, California (Woodward Dam, 1906-1967)
Month	Jan	Feb	Mar	Apr	May	Jun	Jul	Aug	Sep	Oct	Nov	Dec	Year
Record high °F (°C)	71 (22)	83 (28)	83 (28)	96 (36)	103 (39)	112 (44)	114 (46)	110 (43)	110 (43)	99 (37)	88 (31)	77 (25)	114 (46)
Mean daily maximum °F (°C)	52.4 (11.3)	59.0 (15.0)	63.8 (17.7)	70.7 (21.5)	80.5 (26.9)	89.1 (31.7)	95.8 (35.4)	93.9 (34.4)	88.0 (31.1)	78.6 (25.9)	65.7 (18.7)	54.2 (12.3)	74.3 (23.5)
Mean daily minimum °F (°C)	35.1 (1.7)	38.4 (3.6)	40.8 (4.9)	43.5 (6.4)	48.2 (9.0)	54.4 (12.4)	58.4 (14.7)	57.1 (13.9)	54.1 (12.3)	48.0 (8.9)	40.2 (4.6)	36.3 (2.4)	46.2 (7.9)
Record low °F (°C)	14 (−10)	20 (−7)	24 (−4)	27 (−3)	34 (1)	37 (3)	46 (8)	46 (8)	37 (3)	30 (−1)	20 (−7)	12 (−11)	12 (−11)
Average precipitation inches (mm)	2.61 (66)	2.14 (54)	2.21 (56)	1.34 (34)	.45 (11)	.12 (3.0)	0 (0)	.02 (0.51)	.18 (4.6)	.65 (17)	1.24 (31)	2.37 (60)	13.33 (339)
Average snowfall inches (cm)	0.1 (0.25)	0.0 (0.0)	0.0 (0.0)	0.0 (0.0)	0.0 (0.0)	0.0 (0.0)	0.0 (0.0)	0.0 (0.0)	0.0 (0.0)	0.0 (0.0)	0.0 (0.0)	0.0 (0.0)	0.3 (0.76)
Average precipitation days (≥ .01 in)	8	7	7	4	2	1	0	0	1	2	4	7	44

== Demographics ==
Historical population
Census	Pop.	Note	%±
1880	376		—
1890	1,012		169.1%
1910	1,035		—
1920	1,745		68.6%
1930	2,112		21.0%
1940	2,592		22.7%
1950	4,064		56.8%
1960	4,980		22.5%
1970	6,594		32.4%
1980	8,474		28.5%
1990	11,961		41.1%
2000	15,503		29.6%
2010	20,675		33.4%
2020	23,181		12.1%
U.S. Decennial Census

Oakdale is part of the Modesto metropolitan area.

=== 2023 ACS estimate ===
In 2023, the US Census Bureau estimated that the median household income was $86,478, and the per capita income was $36,849. About 10.0% of families and 13.5% of the population were below the poverty line.

=== 2020 census ===
As of the 2020 census, Oakdale had a population of 23,181. The population density was 3,723.9 inhabitants per square mile (1,437.8/km^{2}). The median age was 36.9 years. 26.2% of residents were under the age of 18 and 16.4% were 65 years of age or older. For every 100 females there were 93.8 males, and for every 100 females age 18 and over there were 90.4 males age 18 and over.

The census reported that 99.3% of the population lived in households, 0.2% lived in non-institutionalized group quarters, and 0.6% were institutionalized. 99.6% of residents lived in urban areas, while 0.4% lived in rural areas.

There were 8,192 households in Oakdale, of which 38.5% had children under the age of 18 living in them. Of all households, 50.6% were married-couple households, 7.3% were cohabiting couple households, 15.4% were households with a male householder and no spouse or partner present, and 26.7% were households with a female householder and no spouse or partner present. About 22.1% of all households were made up of individuals and 11.9% had someone living alone who was 65 years of age or older. The average household size was 2.81. There were 5,910 families (72.1% of all households).

There were 8,428 housing units at an average density of 1,353.9 units per square mile (522.7 units/km^{2}), of which 8,192 (97.2%) were occupied. Of the occupied units, 63.0% were owner-occupied and 37.0% were occupied by renters. Of all housing units, 2.8% were vacant. The homeowner vacancy rate was 1.0% and the rental vacancy rate was 2.6%.

Racial composition as of the 2020 census
Race	Number	Percentage
White	15,555	67.1%
Black or African American	206	0.9%
American Indian and Alaska Native	302	1.3%
Asian	553	2.4%
Native Hawaiian and Other Pacific Islander	94	0.4%
Some other race	3,370	14.5%
Two or more races	3,101	13.4%
Hispanic or Latino (of any race)	7,055	30.4%

=== 2010 census ===
At the 2010 census Oakdale had a population of 20,675. The population density was 3,392.6 inhabitants per square mile (1,309.9/km^{2}). The racial makeup of Oakdale was 16,558 (80.1%) White, 163 (0.8%) African American, 210 (1.0%) Native American, 463 (2.2%) Asian, 37 (0.2%) Pacific Islander, 2,386 (11.5%) from other races, and 858 (4.1%) from two or more races. Hispanic or Latino of any race were 5,398 persons (26.1%).

The census reported that 20,488 people (99.1% of the population) lived in households, 75 (0.4%) lived in non-institutionalized group quarters, and 112 (0.5%) were institutionalized.

There were 7,288 households, 3,016 (41.4%) had children under the age of 18 living in them, 3,853 (52.9%) were opposite-sex married couples living together, 1,009 (13.8%) had a female householder with no husband present, 436 (6.0%) had a male householder with no wife present. There were 517 (7.1%) unmarried opposite-sex partnerships, and 36 (0.5%) same-sex married couples or partnerships. 1,573 households (21.6%) were one person and 694 (9.5%) had someone living alone who was 65 or older. The average household size was 2.81. There were 5,298 families (72.7% of households); the average family size was 3.28.

The age distribution was 5,766 people (27.9%) under the age of 18, 1,837 people (8.9%) aged 18 to 24, 5,436 people (26.3%) aged 25 to 44, 5,083 people (24.6%) aged 45 to 64, and 2,553 people (12.3%) who were 65 or older. The median age was 34.9 years. For every 100 females, there were 95.4 males. For every 100 females age 18 and over, there were 90.8 males.

There were 7,822 housing units at an average density of 1,283.5 per square mile, of the occupied units 4,454 (61.1%) were owner-occupied and 2,834 (38.9%) were rented. The homeowner vacancy rate was 2.7%; the rental vacancy rate was 7.7%. 12,342 people (59.7% of the population) lived in owner-occupied housing units and 8,146 people (39.4%) lived in rental housing units.

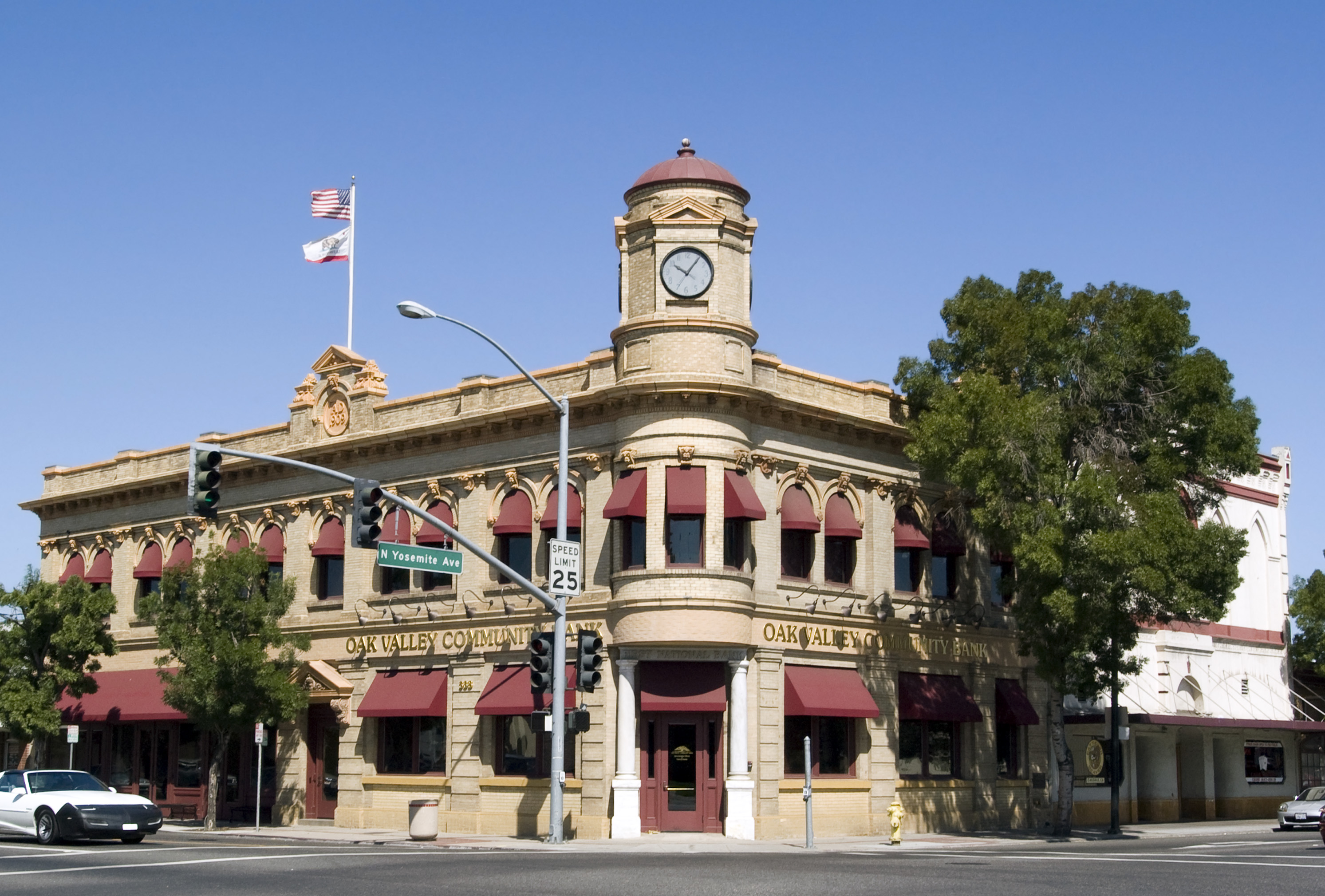
Victorian-era First National Bank of Oakdale building in downtown Oakdale

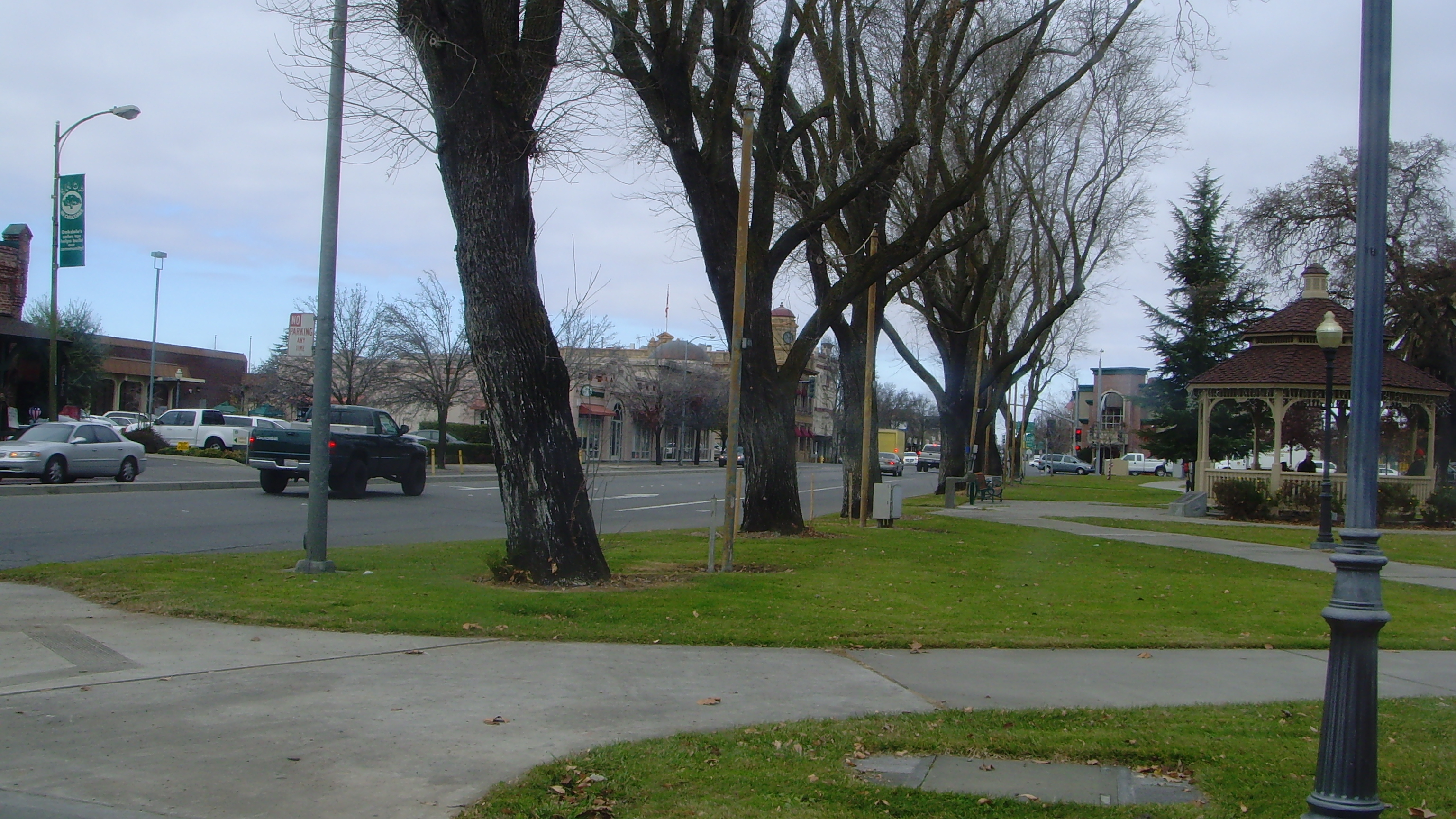
Looking north down Yosemite Avenue toward downtown Oakdale

== Environment ==
=== Soil characteristics ===
Historically the area has been used for orchards and other agricultural uses. Some of the common soil types found in Oakdale are Delhi sand, Oakdale sandy loam, Hanford sandy loam, and Tujunga loamy sand. Oakdale is generally on level ground at an elevation of approximately 190 feet (58 m) above mean sea level. Drainage is generally to the northwest towards the Stanislaus River.

=== Contamination ===
There have been several local releases of toxic chemicals that have resulted in soil contamination and aquifer water contamination. Examples of these releases are:

- Beacon Service Station, 1590 East F Street, Oakdale. This release was a fuel leak caused by an underground tank failure in 1985. Approximately 2,000 U.S. gallons (7,600 L) of product was released into the environment. The groundwater has been contaminated with reported benzene concentrations as high as 1,790 parts per billion. Soil remediation began as early as 1989.
- Chevron Service Station, 346 East F Street, Oakdale. An unknown quantity of gasoline was released. The release was discovered on May 25, 1987, through a site inspection. Groundwater is contaminated and cleanup work ensued.
- Cruse Brothers, 663 South Yosemite Avenue, Oakdale. Diesel fuel contamination was discovered on November 11, 1988, during the removal of a 30-year-old steel 500-U.S.-gallon (1,900 L) tank. The Central Valley Regional Water Quality Control Board sent an Enforcement Action Letter on January 23, 1989.

== Government ==
Cherilyn Bairos was elected mayor in 2021.

In the California State Legislature, Oakdale is in the 4th senatorial district, represented by Republican Marie Alvarado-Gil, and the 9th Assembly district, represented by Republican Heath Flora.

In the United States House of Representatives, Oakdale is in California's 5th congressional district, represented by Republican Tom McClintock.

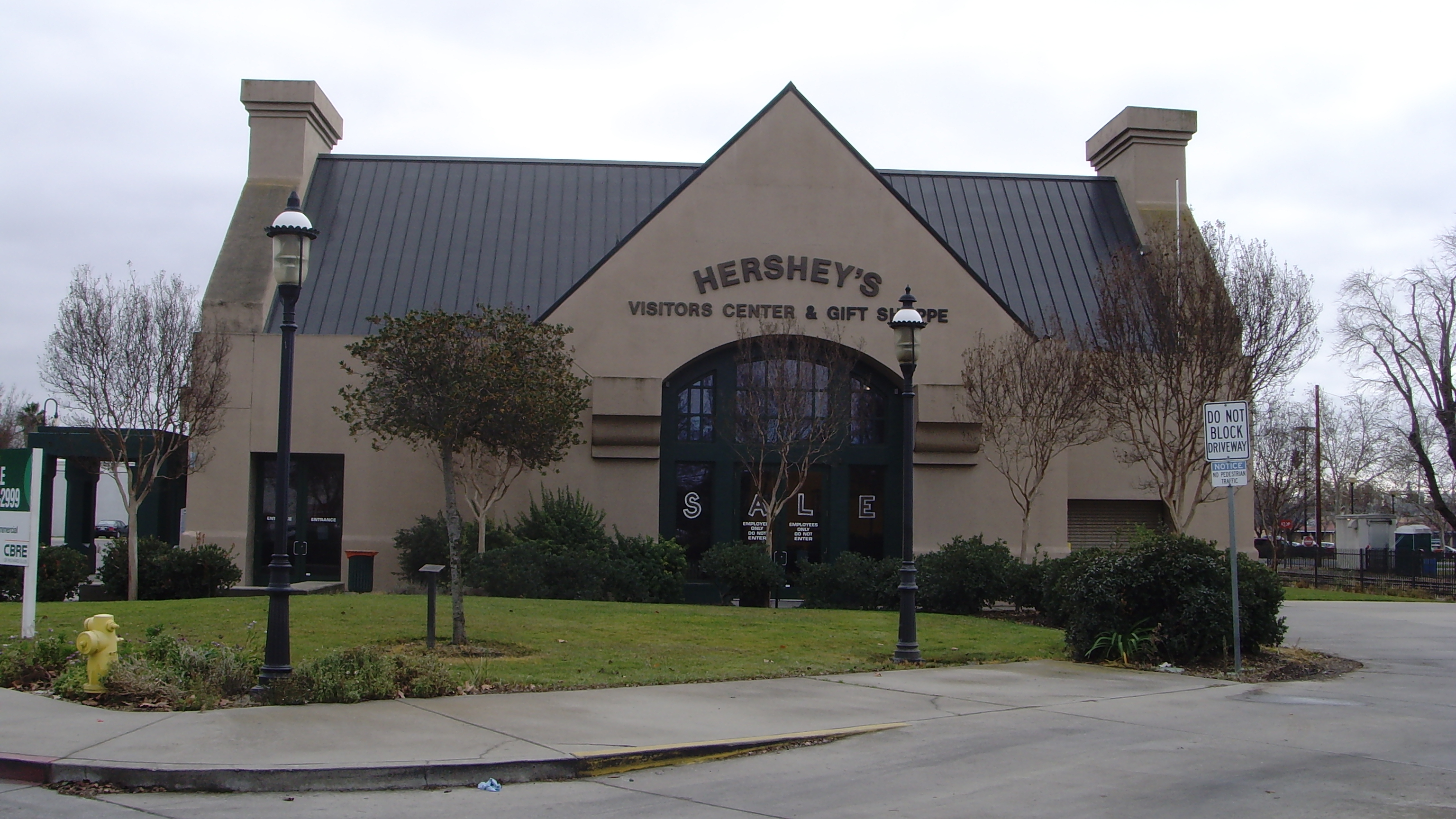
Former Hershey's Oakdale Visitor Center and Shop

== Economy ==
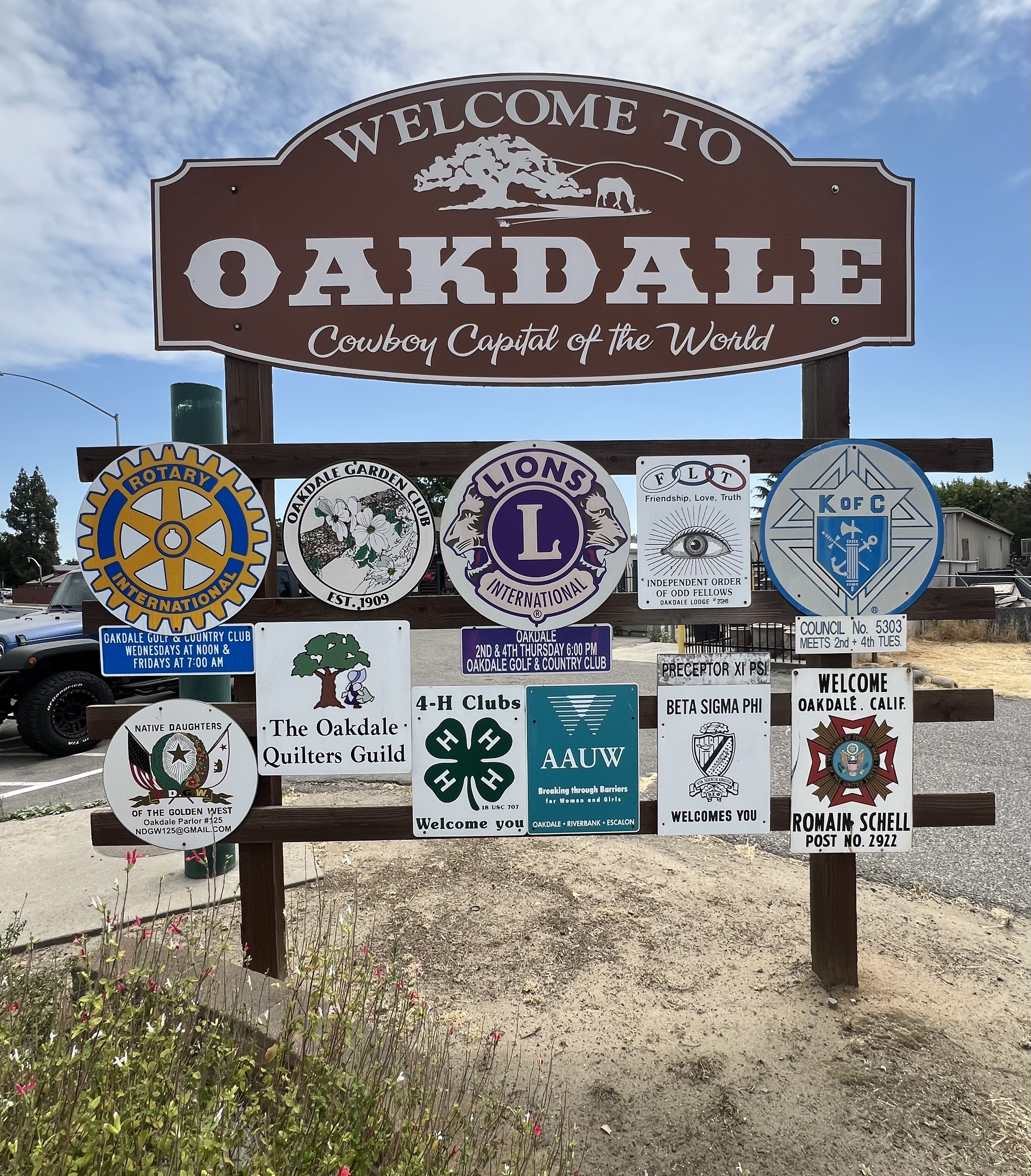
Welcome sign on North Yosemite Avenue

The Oakdale economy centers on agriculture, food manufacturing, and tourism.

Oakdale was the home to the Oakdale Hershey Plant, a satellite plant of Hershey Chocolate, that closed in January 2008 and moved to Mexico. It opened in May 1965, operated the Hershey's Oakdale Visitor Center and Shop in town, and employed about 575 local people. The plant was purchased by Sconza Chocolates, which began production in October 2008.

Many other large food manufacturing operations are nearby, including a ConAgra Foods Hunt's plant, which is one of the largest tomato processing plants in the world. Cattle ranching is common in the surrounding areas, adding to the diversity and character of the local economy.

== Education ==
Oakdale has a high school, a junior high school and four elementary schools. Together they comprise the Oakdale Joint Unified School District.

- Oakdale High School; mascot is the mustang.
- Oakdale Junior High School; mascot is the ram.
- Cloverland Elementary School; mascot is the cougar.
- Fair Oaks Elementary School; mascot is the falcon.
- Magnolia Elementary School; mascot is the bear.
- Sierra View Elementary School; mascot is the coyote.

== Notable people ==
- Tom Brier - ragtime composer and pianist
- Bruce Coslet - professional football player and coach, born in Oakdale and attended Oakdale High School, winning 16 varsity letters before graduating and playing at University of the Pacific.
- Eddie LeBaron - College Football Hall of Fame member, attended Oakdale High School.
- Eric Medlen - NHRA Fuel Funny Car driver, attended Oakdale High School and was raised in Oakdale.
- Brett Dennen - musician
- Matt Vandagriff - professional wrestler

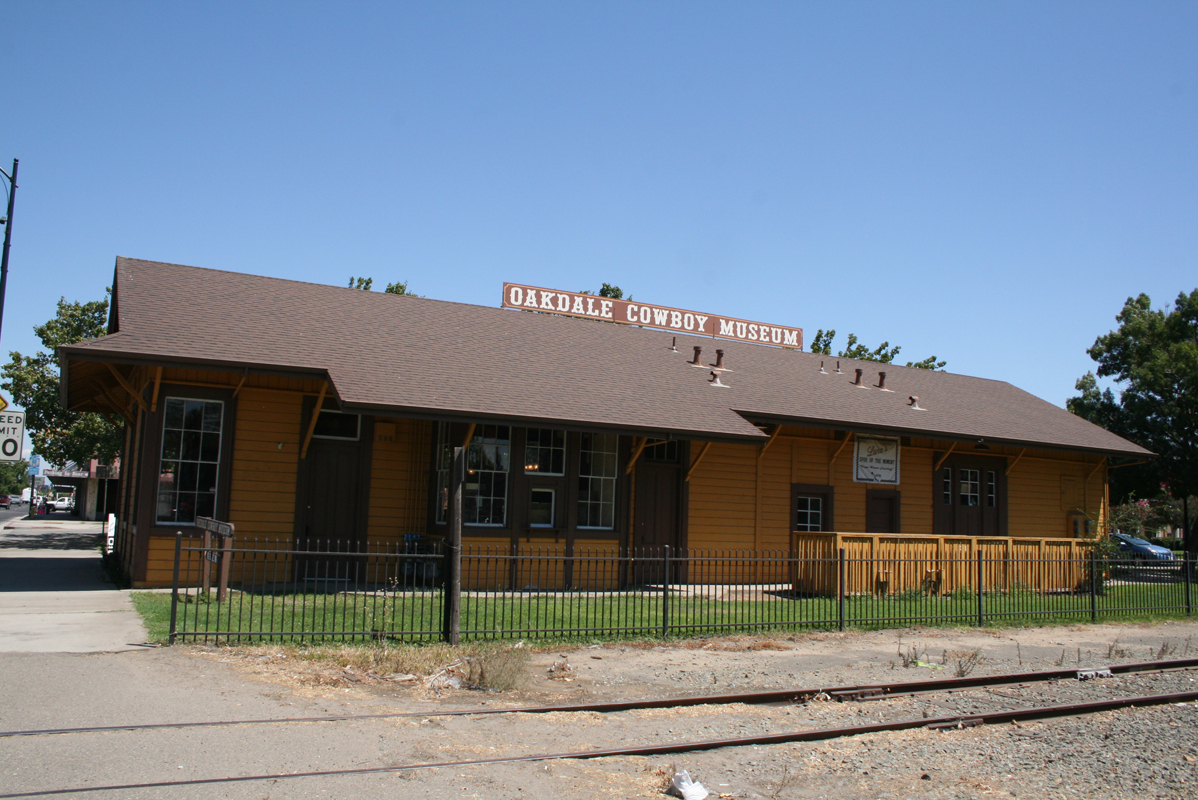
The Oakdale Cowboy Museum

== Attractions ==
The Oakdale Cowboy Museum focuses on the area's ranchers and rodeo cowboys and cowgirls. Exhibits include historic photographs, saddles, rodeo artifacts, and cowboy gear. It is housed in the former Southern Pacific Railroad Oakdale Branch station.

The Oakdale Museum is located in the oldest home in Oakdale and focuses on the families and businesses of the area. Exhibits include historic photographs, furniture, home goods, clothing, yearbooks, and more. The museum is also a research center for people interested in finding out about family from the area.

The Oakdale Cheese & Specialties is owned and operated by Dutch immigrants Walter and Lenneke Bulk. Cheesemaking has been in Walter's family for 4 generations. They specialize in Gouda and offer a variety of choices.

The Stanislaus River offers areas for rafting, kayaking, swimming, fishing, camping and hiking.

The Sierra Dinner Train is located just south of the main intersection (Yosemite & F). Operating on the 3rd oldest rail line in North America, Sierra Railroad, the train has been featured in dozens of film productions. Sierra Dinner Train meanders through open-countryside and offers a unique, year-round venue for dining and family excursions.
