= Oakdale Cemetery =

Oakdale Cemetery may refer to:

- Oakdale Cemetery (DeLand, Florida)
- Oakdale Memorial Gardens, formerly Oakdale Cemetery, Davenport, Iowa
- Oakdale Cemetery (Hendersonville, North Carolina)
- Oakdale Cemetery (Wilmington, North Carolina)
