= Oakdale, Texas =

Polk county rural community

Oakdale is a small rural community in Polk County, Texas. The community was first settled in 1854. In 2000 it had a population of 25. It is located about four miles northeast of Livingston, but seventy-nine miles northeast of Greater Houston area.
