= Parkstone Grammar School =

Location
- Sopers Lane; Poole, Dorset, BH17 7EP; England; 50°44′44″N 1°59′16″W

Information
- Type: Grammar school; Academy
- Established: 1905
- Founder: William Ernest Brennand
- Local authority: Bournemouth, Christchurch and Poole
- Department for Education URN: 136368 Tables
- Ofsted: Reports
- Headmaster: Anna Collins
- Gender: Girls
- Age: 11 to 18
- Enrolment: 1,300
- Houses: Athena Eirene Hestia Alethia Iris Hera
- Colours: Yellow and navy blue
- Website: http://www.parkstone.poole.sch.uk/

Parkstone Grammar School (commonly abbreviated to "PGS") is a selective, all-girls academy school in Poole specializing in science and languages, on the southern coast of England.

== Overview ==
The school is situated in the northern end of the town (less than a mile away from Poole Grammar School). The school has been a recognised science specialist college since 2003 and a language specialist college since 2008.

=== Admissions ===
The school caters for girls between the ages of 11 and 18, teaching all to GCSE and a large proportion to A-level. Approximately 1,300 pupils from school years 7 to 13 attend the school, of which over 350 pupils are in sixth form.

To be accepted to Parkstone Grammar School, all girls are required to sit an entrance test, taking place somewhere in late September.

=== History ===
Founded in 1905 as a co-educational school at Ashley Cross in Parkstone by William Ernest Brennand. It was an independent school until Dorset Council took it over in 1935. Two years later, the schools in Poole were reorganised, and the boys from Parkstone Grammar were transferred to Poole Grammar School, and the girls who were at Poole Grammar transferred to Parkstone Grammar. The two grammar schools both have very close links as they are only approximately 1,000 metres apart.

The first headmistress, Miss W. M. Allen, was in post from 1937, just before the reorganisation, until 1959, by which time the current site at Sopers Lane had been chosen. She laid the foundation stone for the new school. Miss N. L. McGuinness was headmistress from 1960, when the school opened at Sopers Lane, until 1976. Charmian Birchett was head from 1976 to 1987 when Dr. Paula Haes took over, and then Val Morrison until 2001. Anne Shinwell was headmistress from 2001 to Easter 2013 when she retired and her position went to Tracy Harris.

On 1 January 2011 the school officially gained academy status. The school re-implemented a house system on 18 November 2015, after letting it lapse after its usage in the 1970s.

== Additional information ==
The school first accepted pupils from the age of 11 (Year 7) in 2013, after a large-scale change to the structure of schooling in Poole took place.
