= Oakdale, Dorset =

Coordinates: 50°43′58.3″N 1°58′40.9″W

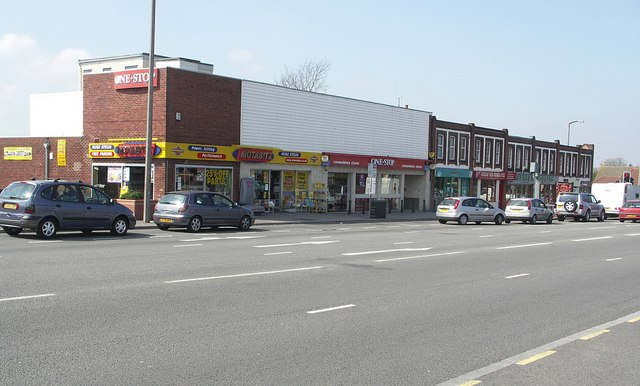
Shops at Oakdale

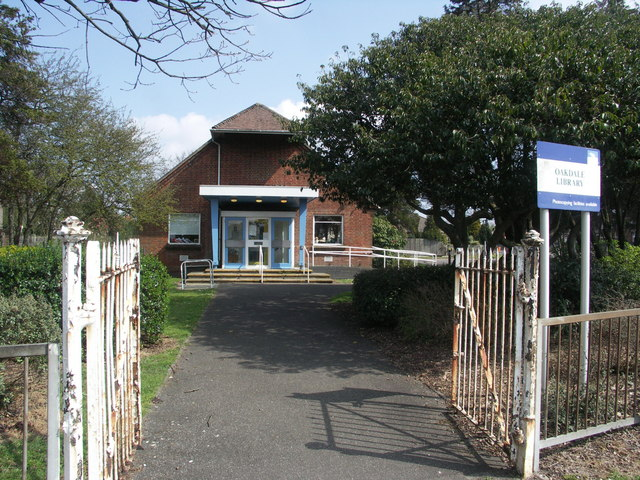
Oakdale Library.

Oakdale is a suburb and electoral ward of Poole in Dorset, England. The electoral ward, which also includes the Stanley Green neighbourhood, had a population of 11,192 at the 2021 census. It shares boundaries with Creekmoor, Poole Town Centre, Parkstone, Newtown and Canford Heath.

The main type of land use in Oakdale is residential. There are also small private businesses such as convenience stores, take away restaurants and pubs, as well as a Texaco petrol station. The parish church is St George's, built in 1959–60 to the designs of Potter and Hare. There is a large allotment area, several fields and two play parks for children.

The main road through Oakdale is Wimborne Road, part of the A35 road leading to Fleetsbridge to the north and Poole Town Centre to the south. The home ground of Poole Town F.C. is at Tatnam Farm, and located in Oakdale.

== Churches ==
- St George's Church, Oakdale

== Schools ==
The following schools are located in Oakdale:

- Stanley Green First School
- Oakdale Junior School
- Oakdale School (formerly)
- St Edward's Roman Catholic-Church of England School

== Politics ==
Oakdale is in the Poole parliamentary constituency. The suburb covers the ward of the same name for elections to Bournemouth, Christchurch and Poole Council.
