= LeAF Studio =

Location
- Holloway Avenue; West Howe; Bournemouth, Dorset, BH11 9JW; England; 50°45′54″N 1°55′20″W

Information
- Type: Studio school
- Established: 1 September 2012
- Local authority: Bournemouth
- Department for Education URN: 138385 Tables
- Ofsted: Reports
- Principal: Nadine Lapskas
- Gender: Mixed
- Age: 13 to 19
- Website: http://www.leafstudio.co.uk

LeAF Studio is a co-educational studio school located in the West Howe area of Bournemouth in the English county of Dorset. The school specialises in education for aspiring athletes and performing artists, with an emphasis on teaching through enterprise and real work experience.

The school was established in September 2012, and was initially co-located at Oak Academy. However the school relocated to its own purpose-built premises in September 2013. The school was rated as 'Good' in its first Ofsted inspection in January 2015.

LeAF Studio is part of the North Bournemouth Learning and Achievement Federation (LeAF) which operates the LeAF Campus. The campus includes Elm Nursery, Elm Primary Academy, Oak Academy and LeAF Studio.

== Elite Athlete Academy ==
The Elite Athlete Academy of LeAF Studio offers a dedicated educational and sports education programme for high performance competitive or professional athletes from any sporting discipline. The curriculum of the Elite Athlete Academy requires all pupils to study an amount of core GCSEs including Sport, while students in the sixth form have the option to study from a range of A-levels and BTECs. The curriculum is designed to be flexible around the needs of students training requirements for their dedicated sports. Many students compete both nationally and internationally in a wide variety of sports. These include:

- Yasmin Kaashoek, England National (Beach) Volleyball - 9th, FIVB U17 World Championships
- Georgia Hall, International Pro-Golfer and Double-Gold Medalist at the Youth Olympics
- Nathan Johnstone, BJJ - 2nd, World Junior Championships

== Stage & Screen School ==
The Stage & Screen School of LeAF Studio offers a dedicated educational and performing arts education programme for who have ambitions to pursue a career in one of the many Performing Arts Industries. The curriculum of the Stage & Screen School requires all pupils to study an amount of core GCSEs including performing arts courses, while students in the sixth form have the option to study from a range of A-levels and BTECs. Performing arts courses offered by the school include Dance, Acting / Drama, Musical Theatre, Music, Music Technology and Production and Production Arts.
