= St Edward's Roman Catholic/Church of England School =

Location
- Dale Valley Road; Oakdale, Poole, Dorset, BH15 3HY; England; 50°44′13″N 1°57′52″W

Information
- Type: Voluntary aided school
- Motto: Unity - Achievement - Faith
- Religious affiliation: Church of England/Roman Catholic
- Established: 1963
- Local authority: Bournemouth, Christchurch and Poole
- Department for Education URN: 113893 Tables
- Ofsted: Reports
- Headteacher: Chris Barnett
- Gender: Co-educational
- Age: 11 to 18
- Enrolment: 1056
- Colours: Blue; Green; Red; Yellow
- Website: https://st-edwards.poole.sch.uk

St Edward's Roman Catholic/Church of England School is a co-educational secondary school and sixth form located in Poole in the English county of Dorset.

The school celebrated its 60th anniversary in 2023, and is one of a small number of joint Roman Catholic and Church of England secondary schools in the country. Originally the school was only open to Roman Catholic students, but over time as the school has grown and as more students have been enrolled, the school has changed its status to also accept Protestant students. The school is affiliated with both the Roman Catholic Diocese of Plymouth and the Anglican Diocese of Salisbury. The school offers a wide variety of subjects at GCSE and has a growing sixth form for students continuing on to A-level. The school is linked with Bele Zinkuka school, South Africa, whose netball team visited the UK in 2005 and played local schools in Poole.

== Recent developments ==
Recent development within the school include:

- A new sports hall and changing facilities, along with a fully equipped fitness suite.
- A new music and SEN-CO area to complement the current music room.
- A modern sixth-form block with many classrooms, a common room area, a large study room and four fully equipped ICT classrooms.
- Smart board technology being used in almost every classroom, and all teachers being equipped with laptop computers.
- 2 science laboratory classrooms and a new, larger main art room.
- A massive new building to accommodate year-7 students and students of all ages.
- An extensive school computer network system that interconnects the many computers in the school intranet, and to a wide range of other resources on the school network.

== School houses ==
A school house system was launched on 17 September 2007. All students and staff, excluding Headteacher Mrs Bevan, were allocated to one of four school houses, each identified by their own colour (red, blue, yellow or green). Students were invited to vote on the names of the houses with themes including the four gospel writers, local natural landmarks, four islands in Poole Harbour, environmental flora around the school, places associated with Saint Edward and four different saints.

The four house names voted for by students were:

- Yellow - Holmes
- Red - Whitlock
- Blue - Farah
- Green - Ennis

The houses were renamed by 2009 to reflect local landmarks as follows:

- Yellow - Kimmeridge
- Red - Lulworth
- Blue - Brownsea
- Green - Corfe

In November 2010, the house system was revamped, and students and teachers were given new houses, so that each tutor group would share the same house. Generally there are two tutor groups of the same house per year.

From September 2013, the House system was removed and replaced with a sports team system, with each team being represented by an Olympic Athlete and a colour. Typically, two forms of each year are in each team. The house points were also removed and were replaced with a credits system.
