= Oak Academy =

Location
- Duck Lane; Bournemouth, Dorset, BH11 9JJ; England; 50°45′45″N 1°55′13″W

Information
- Type: Academy
- Local authority: Bournemouth, Christchurch and Poole
- Trust: Ambitions Academies Trust
- Department for Education URN: 139037 Tables
- Ofsted: Reports
- Principal: Danielle Fisher
- Gender: Co-educational
- Age: 11 to 16
- Enrolment: 654 (as of 2024)
- Website: https://www.oak-academy.co.uk/

Oak Academy (formerly Oakmead College of Technology) is a co-educational secondary school located in the northern outskirts of Bournemouth in the English county of Dorset.

== History ==
Previously a foundation school administered by Bournemouth Borough Council, in December 2012 Oakmead College of Technology converted to academy status and was renamed Oak Academy. The school is now sponsored by the Ambitions Academies Trust due to a legacy of low expectations and low exam outcomes for students. The current OFSTED rating is "Requires Improvement."

The school previously operated a sixth Form provision, but it was suspended in July 2018 due to low pupil numbers.

In September 2012 the school was the temporary location of the new LeAF Studio before the studio school was relocated to its own building in September 2013.

On 23 November 2023, work began on the complete redevelopment of the school site. The plans will see a phased demolition of the existing buildings, excluding the LeAF Studio School sports hall, to replace them with a single block for all subjects.

== Buildings ==
The school is divided into blocks A and B (the original girls' and boys' schools).

A Block contains the following curriculum areas: English and Science, French & Spanish, Health & Social Care, Business and a media classroom. It also contains an assembly hall (hall A), a playground, the sports hall, one IT room, eight science labs, the library and two modern foreign language rooms.

B Block contains other curriculum areas: Geography, History, ICT & Computer Science, Drama, Music and Design & Technology, Sociology and Psychology. There are 5 Design & Technology rooms — one Food Technology room, one Resistant Materials room, one Graphics room, one Art room and one Electronics room. This section of the school also contains four ICT rooms, one Music room, another assembly hall (hall B), a playground, the canteen, the Inclusion Support Centre, and the main administrative offices.

A recently refurbished block now houses all of the Maths lessons delivered at the academy.
