= Oakdale Public School =

- U.S. National Register of Historic Places
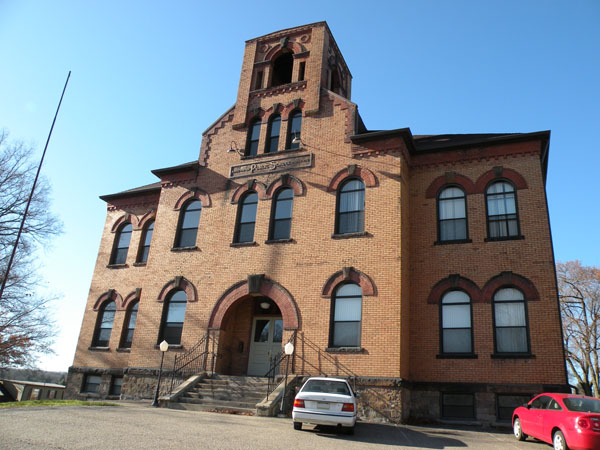

- Location within Pennsylvania Location within the United States
- Location: 33 Hastings Street, Oakdale, Pennsylvania, USA
- Coordinates: 40°23′53.88″N 80°10′59.88″W
- Built: 1894
- Architect: J.M. Andrews, J.E. Allison
- Architectural style: Romanesque Revival
- NRHP reference No.: 97000289
- Added to NRHP: March 28, 1997

The Oakdale Public School at the corner of Hastings Avenue and Noblestown Road in Oakdale, Pennsylvania, United States was built in 1894 in the Romanesque Revival style.

It was added to the National Register of Historic Places on March 28, 1997.

== History and architectural features ==
Later known as the Hastings School, this school served students in grades one through eight and was the only grade school in Oakdale until 1972, when it was closed. The building then stood empty until at least 1997.

The building was added to the National Register of Historic Places on March 28, 1997.

In 2001, the structure was renovated into an apartment building.
