= List of schools in Cambridgeshire =

This is a list of schools in Cambridgeshire, England.

== State-funded schools ==
=== Primary schools ===
- Abbots Ripton CE Primary School, Huntingdon
- Alconbury CE Primary School, Huntingdon
- Alderman Jacobs School, Whittlesey
- Alderman Payne Primary School, Wisbech St Mary
- All Saints Interchurch Academy, March
- Arbury Primary School, Cambridge
- The Ashbeach Primary School, Huntingdon
- Babraham CE Primary School, Cambridge
- Bar Hill Community Primary School, Cambridge
- Barnabas Oley CE Primary School, Great Gransden
- Barrington CE Primary School, Barrington
- Barton CE Primary School, Barton
- Bassingbourn Primary School, Bassingbourn
- Beaupre Community Primary School, Outwell
- The Bellbird Primary School, Sawston
- Benwick Primary School, Benwick
- Bewick Bridge Community Primary School, Cambridge
- Bottisham Primary School, Bottisham
- Bourn CE Primary Academy, Bourn
- Brampton Village Primary School, Brampton
- Brington CE Primary School, Brington
- Buckden CE Primary School, Buckden
- Burrough Green CE Primary School, Burrough Green
- Burrowmoor Primary School, March
- Burwell Village College (Primary), Burwell
- Bury CE Primary School, Bury
- Bushmead Primary School, St Neots
- Caldecote Primary School, Caldecote
- Castle Camps CE Primary School, Castle Camps
- Cavalry Primary Primary School, March
- Cherry Hinton CE Primary School, Cherry Hinton
- Chesterton Primary School, Chesterton
- Cheveley CE Primary School, Cheveley
- Clarkson Infants School, Wisbech
- Coates Primary School, Coates
- Colville Primary School, Cherry Hinton
- Coton CE Primary School, Coton
- Cottenham Primary School, Cottenham
- Cromwell Academy, Huntingdon
- Cromwell Community College, Chatteris
- Crosshall Infant School Academy, Eaton Ford
- Crosshall Junior School, Eaton Ford
- Ditton Lodge Primary School, Newmarket
- Downham Feoffees Primary Academy, Little Downham
- Dry Drayton CE Primary School, Dry Drayton
- Duxford CE Community Primary School, Duxford
- Earith Primary School, Earith
- Eastfield Infant School, St Ives
- Elm CE Primary School, Elm
- Elm Road Primary School, Wisbech
- Elsworth CE Primary School, Elsworth
- The Elton CE Primary School of the Foundation of Frances and Jane Proby, Elton
- Ely St John's Community Primary School, Ely
- Ely St Mary's CE Junior School, Queen Adelaide
- Ermine Street Church Academy, Alconbury Weald
- Eynesbury CE Primary School, Eynesbury
- Farcet CE Primary School, Farcet
- Fawcett Primary School, Trumpington
- Fen Ditton Primary School, Fen Ditton
- Fen Drayton Primary School, Fen Drayton
- Fenstanton and Hilton Primary School, Fenstanton
- Folksworth CE Primary School, Folksworth
- Fordham CE Primary School, Fordham
- Fourfields Community Primary School, Yaxley
- Fowlmere Primary School, Fowlmere
- Foxton Primary School, Foxton
- Friday Bridge Community Primary School, Friday Bridge
- Fulbourn Primary School, Fulbourn
- The Galfrid School, Cambridge
- Gamlingay Village Primary, Gamlingay
- Girton Glebe Primary School, Girton
- Glebelands Primary Academy, Chatteris
- Godmanchester Bridge Academy, Godmanchester
- Godmanchester Community Academy, Godmanchester
- Gorefield Primary Academy, Gorefield
- Great Abington Primary School, Great Abington
- Great and Little Shelford CE Primary School, Great Shelford
- Great Paxton CE Primary School, Great Paxton
- Great Staughton Primary Academy, Great Staughton
- Great Wilbraham CE Primary School, Great Wilbraham
- The Grove Primary School, King's Hedges
- Guilden Morden CE Primary Academy, Guilden Morden
- Guyhirn CE Primary School, Guyhirn
- Hardwick and Cambourne Community Primary School, Hardwick/Cambourne
- Harston and Newton Community Primary School, Harston
- Hartford Infant School, Hartford
- Hartford Junior School, Hartford
- Haslingfield Endowed Primary School, Haslingfield
- Hatton Park Primary School, Longstanton
- Hauxton Primary School, Hauxton
- Hemingford Grey Primary School, Hemingford Grey
- Histon and Impington Brook Primary School, Histon
- Histon and Impington Park Primary School, Histon
- Holme CE Primary School, Holme
- Holywell CE Primary School, Needingworth
- Houghton Primary School, Houghton
- Huntingdon Primary School, Huntingdon
- The Icknield Primary School, Sawston
- Isle of Ely Primary School, Ely
- Isleham CE Primary School, Isleham
- Jeavons Wood Primary School, Cambourne
- Kennett Primary School, Kennett
- Kettlefields Primary School, Stetchworth
- Kimbolton Primary Academy, Kimbolton
- Kinderley Primary School, Tydd St Giles
- Kings Hedges Primary School, Cambridge
- Kingsfield Primary School, Chatteris
- Lantern Community Primary School, Ely
- Leverington Primary Academy, Leverington
- Linton CE Infant School, Linton
- Linton Heights Junior School, Linton
- Lionel Walden Primary School, Doddington
- Little Paxton Primary School, Little Paxton
- Little Thetford CE Primary School, Little Thetford
- Littleport Community Primary School, Littleport
- Longstanton Primary School, Longstanton
- Manea Community Primary School, Manea
- Marleigh Primary Academy, Cambridge
- Mayfield Primary School, Cambridge
- Meadow Primary School, Balsham
- Melbourn Primary School, Melbourn
- Meldreth Primary School, Meldreth
- Mepal and Witcham CE Primary School, Mepal
- Meridian Primary School, Comberton
- Middlefield Primary Academy, Eynesbury
- Millfield Primary School, Littleport
- Milton CE Primary School, Milton
- Milton Road Primary school, Cambridge
- Monkfield Park Primary School, Cambourne
- Morley Memorial Primary School, Cambridge
- Murrow Primary Academy, Murrow
- The Nene Infant School, Wisbech
- New Road Primary School, Whittlesey
- Newnham Croft Primary School, Cambridge
- The Newton Community Primary School, Eltisley
- Oakington CE Primary School, Oakington
- Offord Primary School, Offord D'Arcy
- Orchard Park Community Primary School, Orchard Park
- Orchards CE Academy, Wisbech
- Over Primary School, Over
- Park Lane Primary School, Whittlesey
- Park Street CE Primary School, Cambridge
- The Pathfinder CE Primary School, Northstowe
- Peckover Primary School, Wisbech
- Pendragon Community Primary School, Papworth Everard
- Petersfield CE Primary School, Orwell
- Priory Park Infant School, St Neots
- Priory Junior School, St Neots
- Queen Edith Primary School, Cambridge
- Queen Emma Primary School, Cambridge
- The Rackham CE Primary School, Witchford
- Ramnoth Junior School, Wisbech
- Ramsey Junior School, Ramsey
- Ramsey Spinning Infant School, Ramsey
- Ridgefield Primary School, Cambridge
- Robert Arkenstall Primary School, Haddenham
- The Round House Primary Academy, St Neots
- St Alban's RC Primary School, Cambridge
- St Andrew's CE Primary School, Soham
- St Anne's CE Primary School, Godmanchester
- St Helen's Primary School, Bluntisham
- St Johns CE Primary School, Huntingdon
- St Laurence RC Primary School, Cambridge
- St Luke's CE Primary School, Cambridge
- St Mary's CE Primary School, St Neots
- St Matthew's Primary School, Cambridge
- St Pauls CE Primary School, Cambridge
- St Peter's CE Junior School, Wisbech
- St Philip's CE School, Cambridge
- Sawtry Infants' School, Sawtry
- Sawtry Junior Academy, Sawtry
- The Shade Primary School, Soham
- Shirley Community Primary School, Cambridge
- Somersham Primary School, Somersham
- Spaldwick Primary School, Spaldwick
- The Spinney Primary School, Cambridge
- Spring Meadow Infant School, Ely
- Stapleford Community Primary School, Stapleford
- Steeple Morden CE Primary School, Steeple Morden
- Stilton CE Primary Academy, Stilton
- Stretham Community Primary School, Stretham
- Stukeley Meadows Primary School, Huntingdon
- Sutton CE Primary School, Sutton-in-the-Isle
- Swaffham Bulbeck CE Primary School, Swaffham Bulbeck
- Swaffham Prior CE Primary School, Swaffham Prior
- Swavesey Primary School, Swavesey
- Teversham CE Primary School, Teversham
- Thomas Eaton Primary Academy, Wimblington
- Thongsley Fields Primary and Nursery School, Huntingdon
- Thorndown Primary School, St Ives
- Thriplow CE Primary School, Thriplow
- Townley Primary School, Christchurch
- Trumpington Meadows Primary School, Trumpington
- Trumpington Park Primary School, Trumpington
- University of Cambridge Primary School, Cambridge
- Upwood Primary Academy, Upwood
- The Vine Inter-Church Primary School, Cambourne
- Warboys Primary Academy, Warboys
- Waterbeach Community Primary School, Waterbeach
- The Weatheralls Primary School, Soham
- Westfield Junior School, St Ives
- Westwood Primary School, March
- Wheatfields Primary School, St Ives
- Wilburton CE Primary School, Wilburton
- William de Yaxley CE Academy, Yaxley
- William Westley CE Primary School, Whittlesford
- Willingham Primary School, Willingham
- Winhills Primary Academy, St Neots
- Wintringham Primary Academy, St Neots
- Wisbech St Mary CE Academy, Wisbech St Mary
- Wyton on the Hill Primary School, Wyton on the Hill
- Yaxley Infant School, Yaxley

=== Secondary schools ===
- Abbey College, Ramsey
- Bassingbourn Village College, Bassingbourn
- Bottisham Village College, Bottisham
- Cambourne Village College, Cambourne
- Cambridge Academy for Science and Technology, Cambridge
- Chesterton Community College, Cambridge
- Coleridge Community College, Cambridge
- Comberton Village College, Comberton
- Cottenham Village College, Cottenham
- Cromwell Community College, Chatteris
- Ely College, Ely
- Ernulf Academy, Eynesbury
- Hinchingbrooke School, Huntingdon
- Impington Village College, Impington
- Linton Village College, Linton
- Longsands Academy, St Neots
- Melbourn Village College, Melbourn
- Neale-Wade Academy, March
- Netherhall School, Cambridge
- North Cambridge Academy, Cambridge
- Northstowe Secondary College, Northstowe
- Parkside Community College, Cambridge
- St Bede's School, Cambridge
- St Ivo Academy, St Ives
- St Peter's School, Huntingdon
- Sawston Village College, Sawston
- Sawtry Village Academy, Sawtry
- Sir Harry Smith Community College, Whittlesey
- Soham Village College, Soham
- Swavesey Village College, Swavesey
- Thomas Clarkson Academy, Wisbech
- Trumpington Community College, Cambridge
- Vista Academy Littleport, Littleport
- Witchford Village College, Witchford

=== Special and alternative schools ===
- Castle School, Cambridge
- The Cavendish School, Impington
- The Centre School, Cottenham
- Granta School, Linton
- The Harbour School, Wilburton
- Highfield Ely Academy, Ely
- Highfield Littleport Academy, Littleport
- The Martin Bacon Academy, Northstowe
- Meadowgate Academy, Wisbech
- Pilgrim PRU, Cambridge
- Samuel Pepys School, St Neots
- Spring Common Academy, Huntingdon
- TBAP Cambridge AP Academy, Cambridge
- TBAP Octavia AP Academy, Wisbech
- TBAP Unity Academy, St Neots

=== Further education ===
- Cambridge Maths School, Cambridge
- Cambridge Regional College, Cambridge
- Hills Road Sixth Form College, Cambridge
- Huntingdonshire Regional College, Huntingdon
- College of West Anglia, Wisbech
- Long Road Sixth Form College, Cambridge

== Independent schools ==
=== Primary and preparatory schools ===
- Alconbury Elementary School, Alconbury
- Cambridge International School, Cambridge
- Cambridge Steiner School, Fulbourn
- King's College School, Cambridge
- Magdalene House, Wisbech
- Oaks International School, Cambridge
- St Faith's School, Cambridge
- Whitehall School, Somersham

=== Senior and all-through schools ===
- Abbey College Cambridge, Cambridge
- Alconbury High School, Alconbury
- Cambridge Arts & Sciences, Cambridge
- Cardiff Sixth Form College, Cambridge
- Heritage School, Cambridge
- Kimbolton School, Kimbolton
- King's Ely, Ely
- Landmark International School, Fulbourn
- The Leys School, Cambridge
- Mander Portman Woodward, Cambridge
- The Perse School, Cambridge
- St Andrew's College, Cambridge
- St Mary's School, Cambridge
- Sancton Wood School, Cambridge
- Stephen Perse Foundation, Cambridge
- Wisbech Grammar School, Wisbech

=== Special and alternative schools ===
- Aurora Fairway School, St Ives
- Aurora Meldreth Manor School, Meldreth
- Begdale House School, Elm
- Cambian Home Tree School, Friday Bridge
- Cambian Wisbech School, Wisbech
- Glebe House, Shudy Camps
- Gretton School, Cambridge
- Holme Court School, Cambridge
- Hope Tree School, Impington
- The Old School House, Friday Bridge
- On Track Education Centre, Wisbech
- Papworth Hall School, Papworth Everard
- The Red Balloon Learner Centre, Cambridge
- Selwyn Hall School, Foxton
- Shelldene House School, Friday Bridge
