= Long Road Sixth Form College =

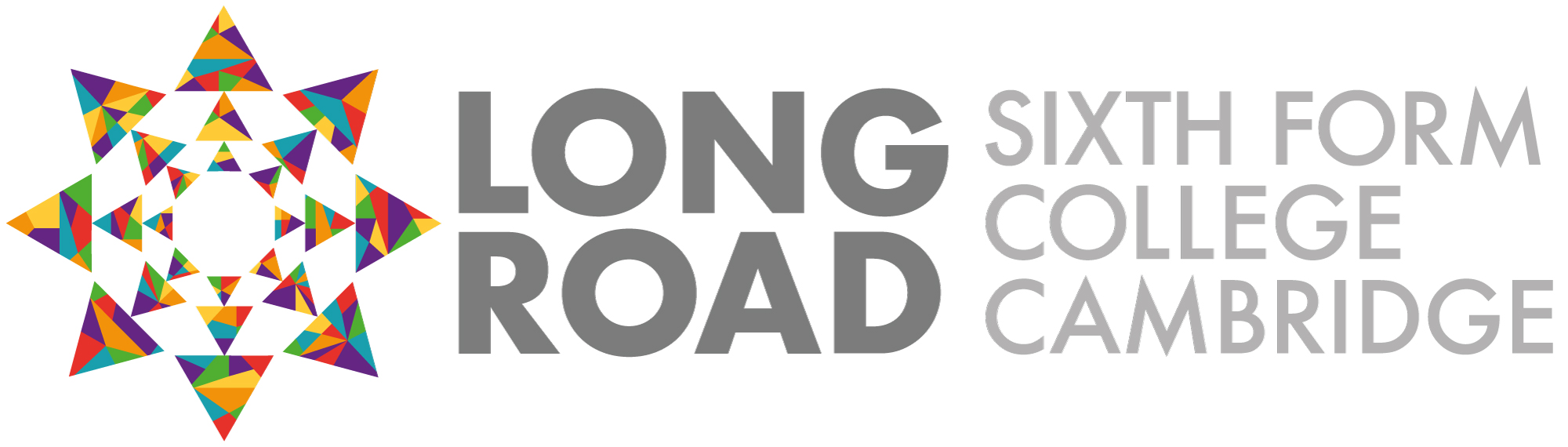

- Looking across towards the College's main buildings from the top floor of D Block.

Location
- Long Road; Cambridge, Cambridgeshire, CB2 8PX; England; 52.178135°N 0.132784°E

Information
- School type: Public sector, sixth form college
- Established: 1974; 52 years ago
- Status: Open
- Local authority: Cambridgeshire LA
- Ofsted: Reports
- Chairperson: Hugo Macey
- Principal: Steve Dann
- Staff: 190
- Gender: Coeducation
- Age: 16 to 19
- Enrolment: 2,300 (2017)
- Language: English
- Campus size: 23 acres (9.3 ha)
- Colours: Purple, orange, red, green, teal, yellow
- Sports: Badminton, basketball, football, hockey, netball, rounders, rugby, tennis, cricket, volleyball
- Feeder schools: Bassingbourn Village College, Bottisham Village College, Cambourne Village College, Cambridge Academy for Science and Technology, Chesterton Community College, Ely College, Coleridge Community College, Comberton Village College, Cottenham Village College, Impington Village College, Linton Village College, Manor Community College, Melbourn Village College, Netherhall School, Parkside Community College, Sawston Village College, Soham Village College, St Bedes Inter-Church School, Swavesey Village College, Trumpington Community College, Witchford Village College
- Website: www.longroad.ac.uk

Long Road Sixth Form College (LRSFC) is a state co-educational sixth form college in Cambridge, England. It is on Long Road, from which it draws its name, and is next to the Cambridge Bio-Medical Campus which encompasses Addenbrooke's Hospital. The College provides full-time A level courses in addition to Level 3 Diploma courses, Level 2 Diploma courses and GCSE consolidation courses.

== History ==
Established in 1974, the College occupies a 23-acre (9.3 ha) site. Prior to this it was the Cambridgeshire High School for Girls, a girls' grammar school. A significant proportion of the College's current buildings date from this period, although there has been extensive renovation and the construction of three new buildings, as well as a sports centre that opened in 2005 (the College's first new sports building since 1939). Other renovation projects included the expansion of the Learning Resource Centre (in 2010), performing arts studios (in June 2012) and the student centre (in November 2012). Science laboratories were updated in August 2013 and new teaching spaces for media diploma and business diploma courses were opened in August 2013. Additional classroom space was provided for sociology and for the Level 4 Foundation in art and design course (2015). There are extended classrooms for the Criminology Diploma (2016).

== Academia ==
The College has approximately 2,300 full-time students, who are between the ages of 16 and 19. Most of these students study A level courses, with others taking Level 3 Diploma courses, one-year GCSE courses or Level 2 Diploma courses.

== Sports ==
The College has sport facilities including playing fields (a football pitch, a rugby pitch), floodlit all-weather hockey pitch, two outdoor basketball courts, two tennis courts, and an indoor sports centre which includes a gymnasium and an indoor basketball court.

External clubs also use the College's facilities as their home venue, such as Cambridge South Hockey Club on the Hockey pitch and Cambridge Cats Basketball Club in the gymnasium.

== Notable alumni ==
=== Cambridgeshire High School for Girls ===
- P. D. James, crime writer
- Jean Purdy, nurse and embryologist
- Margaret Spufford, historian
- Frances Stewart, development economist

=== Long Road Sixth Form College ===
- Sam Corley, Anglican bishop
- Heather Craney, actor who has appeared in Vera Drake, Life of Riley and Torchwood
- Everton Fox, weather presenter who previously presented for BBC Weather
- Emerald O'Hanrahan, actor who plays Emma Carter in The Archers
- Nick Mulvey, musician, twice nominated for the Mercury Music Prize
- Thomas Ridgwell, known for his internet videos under the name TomSka
- Rowan Robertson, musician, recruited to play guitar for Dio at age 17
