= Henry Morris (education) =

Founder of Village Colleges

Henry Morris (13 November 1889 – 14 December 1961) is known primarily as the founder of village colleges. He was the Chief Education Officer for Cambridgeshire for over thirty years, taking up the post in 1922 during a time of depression in the United Kingdom following the First World War.

== Early life ==
Morris was born in Southport in Lancashire on 13 November 1889. At the age of fourteen he began work as an office boy at The Southport Visiter, later becoming a reporter. In 1910 he moved to St David's University College, Lampeter to read for a degree in theology, and in 1912 moved to Exeter College, Oxford. At the outbreak of the First World War he volunteered for army service, and became an officer in the RASC. Following the end of the war he read moral sciences (philosophy) at King's College, Cambridge, graduating with a second-class degree in 1920.

== Career ==
After a year as Assistant Secretary, Henry Morris took up the post of Secretary of Education for Cambridgeshire in 1922. At one point during the Great Depression, Cambridgeshire was the second poorest county in England, despite the relative wealth of the university. Education outside the City of Cambridge was in a poor state due to lack of funding, with no separate secondary schools in the countryside; all children between the ages of three and fourteen were educated in their village school-house, often in one room and by the same, single teacher for their entire school career. Morris envisioned the integration of secondary and community education accessible by all those living in the villages and small towns around Cambridgeshire: the idea of 'village colleges'. He described this as "raising the school leaving age to ninety", and firmly believed that education, both formal and informal, should be a lifelong process. In the 1930s his visions materialised as the village colleges he had initially only hoped for, and the first four village colleges in Cambridgeshire were opened before the country became heavily involved in the conflicts of the Second World War.

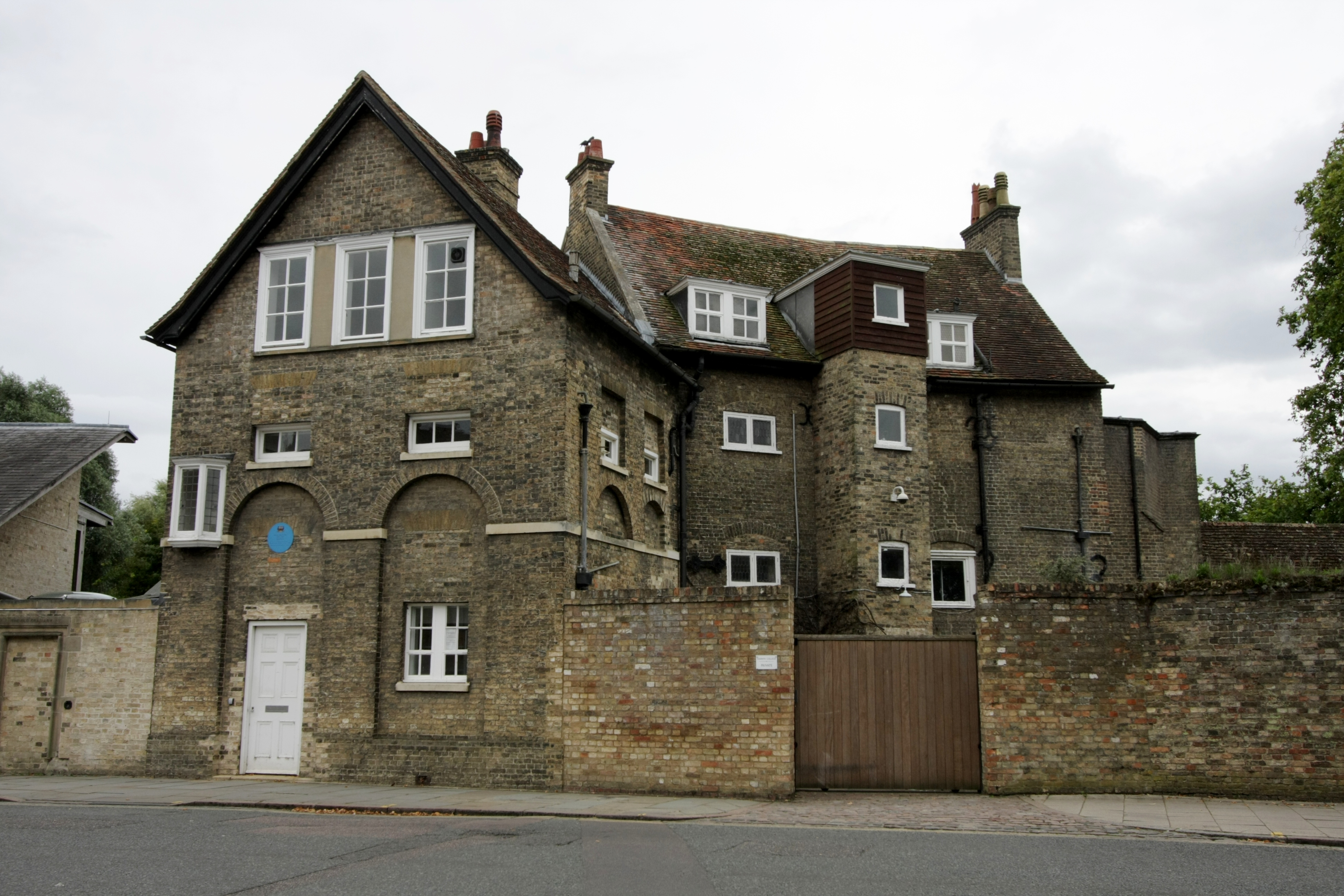
The Old Granary, Silver Street, Cambridge, Morris's home until 1946, where he is commemorated by a blue plaque

Until 1946, Morris lived at The Old Granary in Silver Street, Cambridge, where he was the tenant of Maud Darwin, daughter-in-law of the naturalist Charles Darwin. The building is now part of Darwin College and has a blue plaque commemorating Morris.

Henry Morris' idea evolved from what was initially seen by many in the government as a radical, liberal, paternalistic approach to delivering secondary education; to a system of education that was adopted by many other counties within the United Kingdom and abroad, due to its proven success in Cambridgeshire. By the time of his death in 1961, there were many village colleges delivering education to both secondary school students (11- to 16-year-olds), and members of their local communities of all ages.

There are still village colleges in Cambridgeshire and other areas of the country.

He died on 10 December 1961 at Hill End Hospital, St Albans, where he had spent his last months; a cremation ceremony at Golders Green Crematorium took place on 14 December 1961.

== Village colleges ==
The following village colleges were founded by Morris.

- Sawston Village College (1930)
- Bottisham Village College (1937)
- Linton Village College (1937)
- Impington Village College (1939)
- Bassingbourn Village College (1954)

Two further colleges were opened by him shortly after his retirement from the post in 1954.

- Soham Village College (1958)
- Swavesey Village College (1958)
- Comberton Village College (1959)

== Henry Morris Memorial Trust ==
The Henry Morris Memorial Trust was established in his memory by a group of his friends in 1963. The trust provides travel and study grants to young people from Cambridge, East Cambridgeshire and South Cambridgeshire, Huntingdonshire and Fenland.

Www.Henry Morris.org

== Bibliography ==
- Henry Morris and the Idea of the Village College Today by Harry Rée, 1971
- Educator Extraordinary: The Life and Achievements of Henry Morris by Harry Rée, Longman, 1973
- The Henry Morris Collection by Harry Rée, Cambridge University Press, 1984
