= Barton, Cambridgeshire =

Village in Cambridgeshire, England

Coordinates: 52.182°N 0.0562°E

Barton
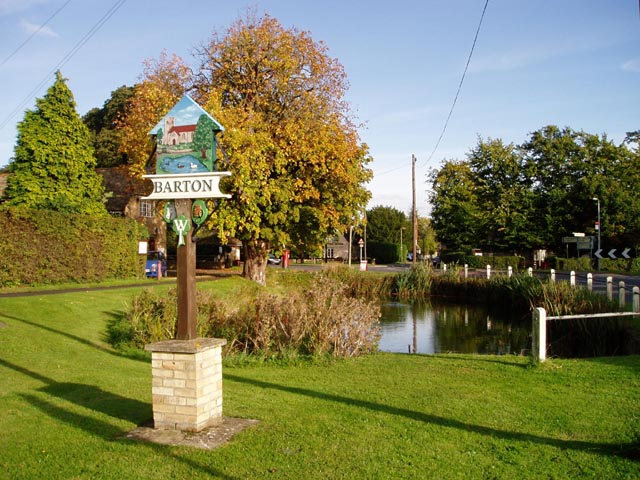
- Barton village pond

- Location within Cambridgeshire
- Area: 2.79 sq mi (7.2 km^{2})
- Population: 846 (2011 Census)
  - Density: 303/sq mi (117/km^{2})
- OS grid reference: TL401559
- District: South Cambridgeshire
- Shire county: Cambridgeshire
- Region: East
- Country: England
- Sovereign state: United Kingdom
- Post town: CAMBRIDGE
- Postcode district: CB23

Barton is a village and civil parish in the South Cambridgeshire district of Cambridgeshire, England. It is about 4 miles (6.4 km) south-west of Cambridge, near junction 12 of the M11 motorway.

== History ==
The Roman road Akeman Street may have passed through the village. Barton, Old English Bartone, is mentioned in the Domesday Book. At that time, 1086, Robert, Count of Mortain, Humphrey from Guy de Raimbeaucourt, and William of Keynes were listed as Barton land-owners.

== Economy ==
Barton's village shop complex used to include a shoe shop, hair and beauty salon, and Conkers Stores, a traditional village shop and Post Office, and the area's only petrol station, which is attached to a car franchise and has a shop which sells confectionery imported from the United States. Now, only Conkers, the petrol station and the car franchise remain. There are two public houses in the village: The Hoops, on New Road; and the White Horse Inn, on the High Street. Barton is also home to a country shopping complex, Burwash Manor Barns, housing among other businesses a butcher, organic grocer, tea rooms, toy shop, wine merchant, and Persian rug outlet. The complex attracts visitors from across Cambridgeshire. Also in Barton is the headquarters of The Countryside Restoration Trust, which has been there since the charity's establishment in 1993.

Employment within the village is very limited. Most residents commute to work at locations across southern Cambridgeshire and in London. The area is starting to attract commuters, who park their cars and then cycle to work. There are plans for some kind of park and ride/cycle on the outskirts of Barton.

== Landmarks ==
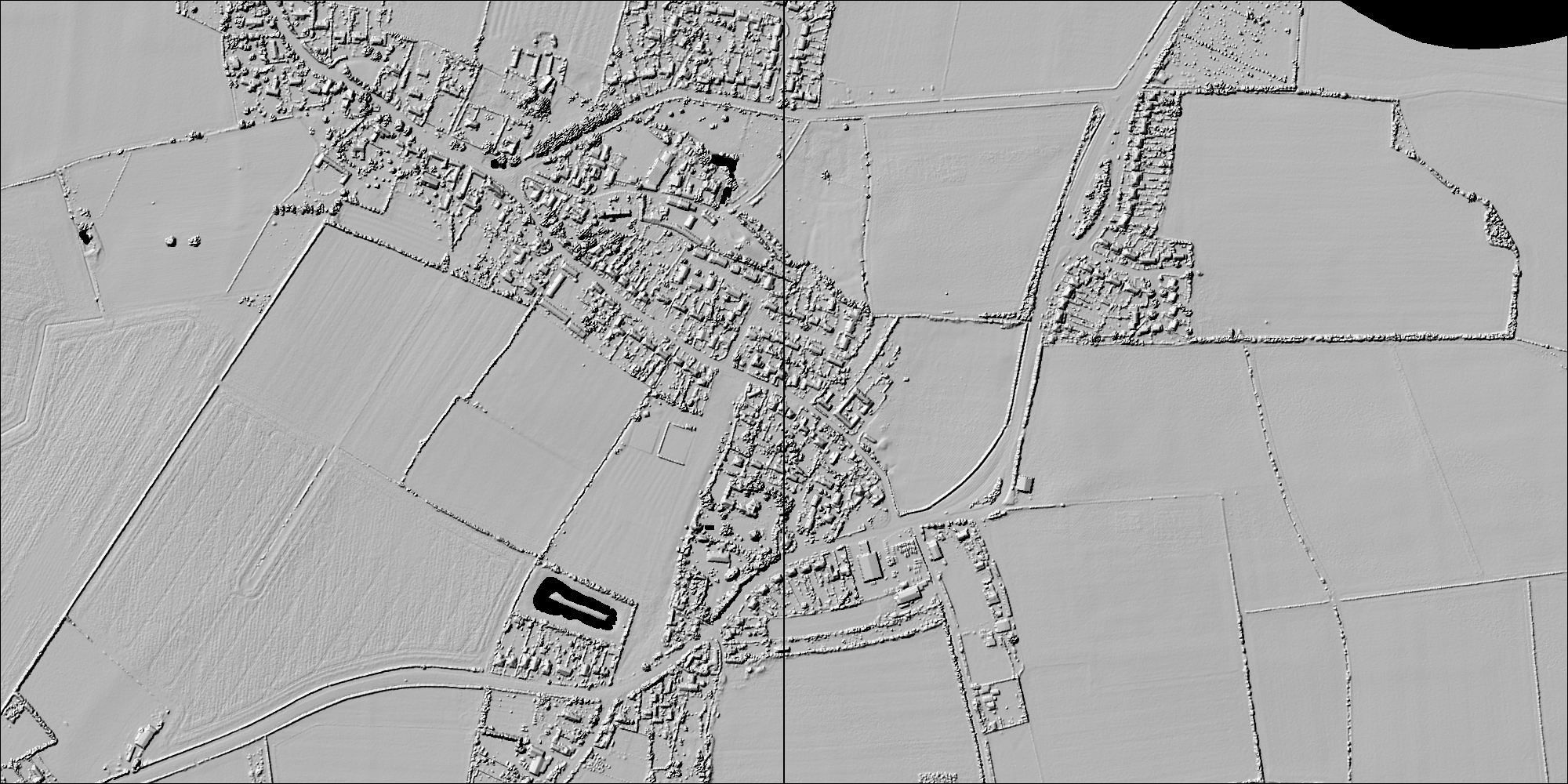
Lidar survey image of Barton

Between the High Street and A603 Wimpole Road lies the village's recreation ground, with a full size football pitch, tennis courts, half pipe, children's play area, pavilion, bowls club, car park, dog walks, and rough ground for general recreation. A village hall neighbours the school.

The Barton Road Rifle Range is 200 yards (180 m) north of the village, where regular military training takes place.

The Mullard Radio Astronomy Observatory is just south of the village. The antenna dishes of its Ryle Telescope are positioned along 5 kilometres (3 mi) of the disused Cambridge to Oxford railway line and can be seen from most places in the village. The signals from several dishes are combined to give the resolution of a much larger single dish.

== Religion ==
Barton has two churches, one Church of England and one Baptist, both on Church Lane. There are some pictures and a description of the mediaeval St Peter's at the Cambridgeshire Churches website.

The Barton Woodland Burial Ground just outside the village provides natural burials.

== Education ==
Barton Church of England Primary School serves pupils from the village and from nearby Grantchester, and performed well under Ofsted inspection in the first decade of the 21st century. The village is in the catchment area for Comberton Village College, a state comprehensive school which in 2005 achieved the highest GCSE results of any state comprehensive in England. Students from Barton travel for further education to Cambridge's Hills Road Sixth Form College, Long Road Sixth Form College, Cambridge Regional College, and Impington Village College. Public schools are also present in Cambridge. Barton is visited weekly by a mobile library bus administered by South Cambridgeshire District Council.

== Transport ==
Barton is less than 1 mile (1.6 km) via Barton Road from the M11, which provides links to North London. The nearby A603 joins the A505 and M1, linking Barton to London through Watford. Cambridge railway station, under fifteen minutes' drive from Barton (traffic permitting), provides access to rail connections with London King's Cross and Liverpool Street. Stansted Airport is thirty minutes' drive from Barton along the M11. The village once had its own station at Lord's Bridge on the now-closed Varsity Line between Oxford and Cambridge.

== Demography ==
Historical population of Barton
| Year | 1801 | 1811 | 1821 | 1831 | 1841 | 1851 | 1861 | 1871 | 1881 | 1891 | 1901 |
|---|---|---|---|---|---|---|---|---|---|---|---|
| Population | 218 | 231 | 273 | 284 | 319 | 308 | 324 | 418 | 323 | 281 | 301 |
| Year | 1911 | 1921 | 1931 | 1941 | 1951 | 1961 | 1971 | 1981 | 1991 | 2001 | 2011 |
| Population | 276 | 243 | 327 | | 528 | 788 | 923 | 909 | 803 | 799 | 846 |
Census: 1801–2011

== Notable people ==
- John Hayward, British politician
