= Burroughs School =

Burroughs School may refer to:

- Burroughs School (Conway, South Carolina) - listed on the National Register of Historic Places
- John Burroughs School - a private, non-sectarian preparatory school
- Nannie Helen Burroughs School - formerly the National Training School for Women and Girls
- John Burroughs High School - a public high school located in Burbank, California
- John Burroughs Middle School (Los Angeles) - a public middle school in Hancock Park, Los Angeles, California
- Sherman E. Burroughs High School - a public high school located in Ridgecrest, CA
- Burrough Green Primary School - a primary school in South Cambridgeshire
