= Sawston Village College =

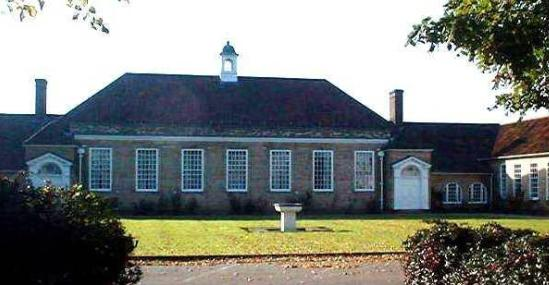

Location
- New Road; Sawston, Cambridgeshire, CB22 3BP; England; 52°07′35″N 0°09′49″E

Information
- Type: Academy
- Motto: C[ommunity]A[mbition]R[espect]E[ndeavour]
- Established: 1930
- Founder: Henry Morris
- Local authority: Cambridgeshire County Council
- Department for Education URN: 136775 Tables
- Ofsted: Reports
- Headteacher: Jonathan Russell
- Staff: 110
- Gender: coeducational
- Age: 11 to 16
- Enrolment: Approximately 1130 students
- Houses: 4 - Earheart (Blue) , DaVinci (Green), Mandela (Red) and Turing (Purple)
- Colours: Burgundy, White
- Current Headboy/girl: Elliott Romero-Watt (Years: 2026-2028)
- Website: http://www.sawstonvc.org/

Sawston Village College is an academy school in Sawston, Cambridgeshire, England. It was the first community college and Village College in the country, and is currently the Sunday Times State 11-16 Secondary School of the Year. It was founded in 1930 and realised the vision of Henry Morris, then Chief Education Officer for Cambridgeshire.

== History ==
Sawston Village College was opened in 1930, the first of the village colleges instigated by Henry Morris. Its circa 1030 pupils aged 11 – 16 share the campus with adults who come to the college for a range of purposes: education, socialising, leisure and sports.

The college also has the only youth-led cinema in the country. Its pupils take responsibility for the function of the cinema – front of house, projection and business planning; offering regular screenings to the local community.

On 1 June 2011, Sawston Village College gained academy status, effectively ending Cambridgeshire County Council's control and funding of the school.

On 6 September 2012, 14:15 BST, one wing of the original college building was devastated by a fire. The Walnut gallery, Main Staff Room, and Sawston Public Library were destroyed, and the Henry Morris Hall was flooded from the hosepipes. The staff evacuated the pupils. Everyone was accounted for, and there were no casualties. The incident is thought to have been an act of arson.

Sawston Village College was crowned the UK's State 11-16 Secondary School of the Year by the Sunday Times 32nd edition in 2024.

In early 2025, construction on a new building within the school site begun. This building was to be used for the tech classrooms as the older tech block is planned to be destroyed. With this build changes are projected to be made to other areas as well, such as the PE department with new changing rooms. This new build was hoped to be finished by the beginning of Spring Term 2027, but has since been pushed back to after the February half-term, while all changes and the full site regeneration are scheduled for spring in 2028.In November 2026, it was announced that the new build would be christened the 'Pelican Wing', as a reference to the school emblem, which depicts a pelican.

== Notable alumni ==
- Heather Craney – Actress
- Peter Steinberg – USA Rugby Head Coach
- Ray Freeman – English Footballer
- Steven Mackintosh - Actor
- Michael Birch – Founder of Bebo.
- Mark Bonner - Football Manager

== Feeder schools ==
Children from the following schools generally start attending Sawston Village College at age 11:

- Bellbird Primary School, Sawston
- Icknield Primary School, Sawston
- Babraham CofE Primary School
- William Westley Primary School, Whittlesford
- Duxford Primary School
- Stapleford Primary School
- Great and Little Shelford Primary School
- Fawcett Primary School

== Destination Schools ==
Students continuing in Further Education beyond 16 generally attend one of the following:

- Cambridge Regional College;
- Hills Road Sixth Form College;
- Impington Village College;
- Long Road Sixth Form College;
- Netherhall School;
- Saffron Walden County High School.
