= Village college =

Coordinates: 52.247093°N 0.116214°E

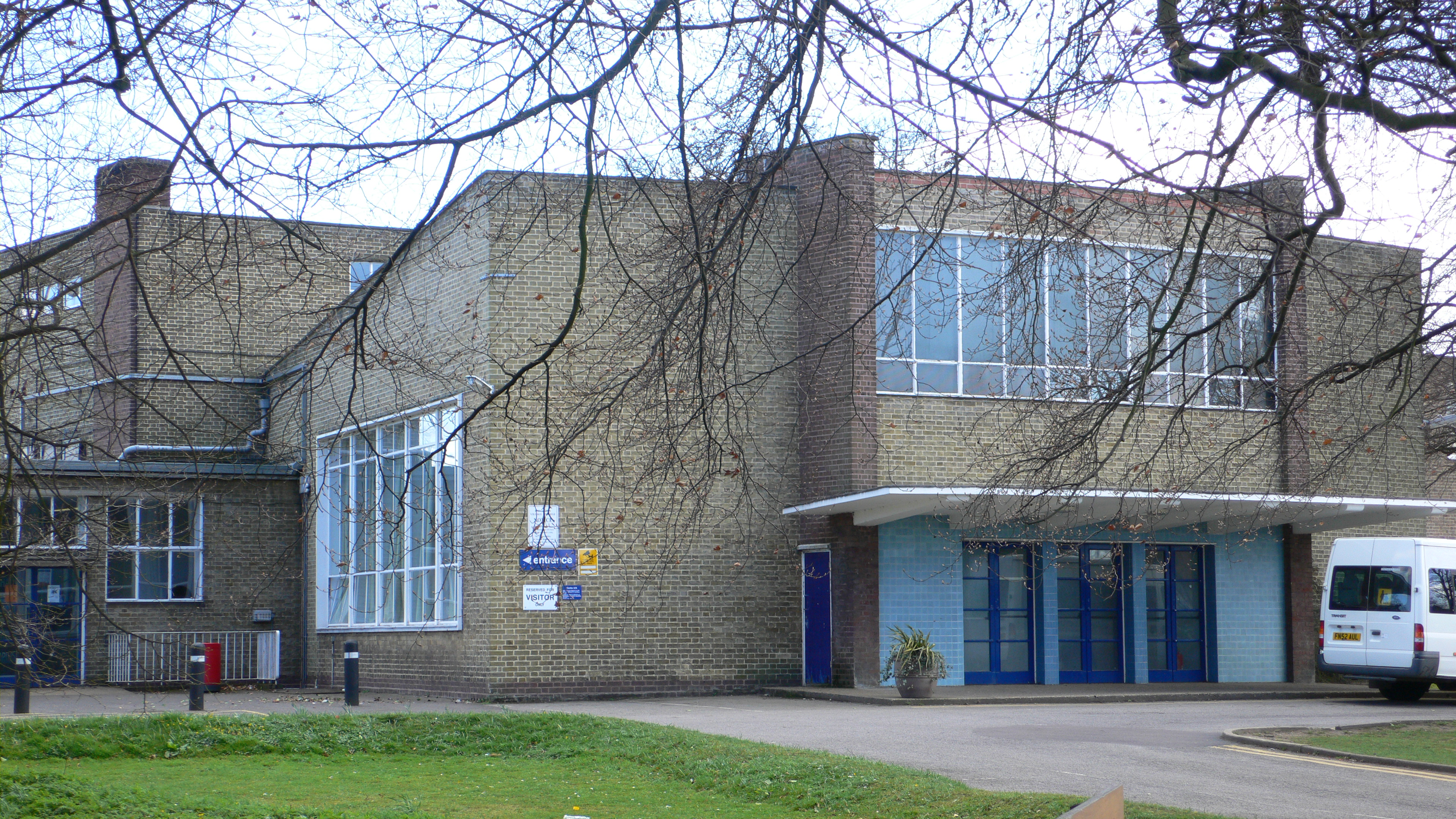
Impington Village College

The village college is an institution specific to Cambridgeshire, England, including the Peterborough unitary authority area. It caters for the education of 11- to 16-year-olds during the day, and provides educational and leisure facilities to the wider community out of school hours.

Village colleges were the brainchild of Henry Morris, the then Chief Education Officer for Cambridgeshire, who had a vision of a school that would serve the whole community, stem migration from the countryside to the towns, and provide a decent education to pupils who had previously only been served by the upper years of elementary schools.

In 1924, Morris wrote a Memorandum on the Provision of Education and Social Facilities for the Countryside, with Special Reference to Cambridgeshire. Morris wrote that:

- the village college would be "the community centre of the neighbourhood";
- "it would not only be the training ground for the art of living, but the place in which life is lived";
- "the village college could lie athwart the daily lives of the community it served; and in it the conditions would be realised under which education would not be an escape from reality, but an enrichment and transformation of it".

His original plan was that the site of the college would also be home to the village's other public services. The first, Sawston Village College, opened in 1930 with Bottisham, Linton, and Bassingbourn following a few years later. Under Morris' influence, many of the colleges have had distinguished architects, notably the one at Impington designed by Walter Gropius and Maxwell Fry.

Between the implementation of the Education Act 1944 and Cambridgeshire's adoption of the comprehensive school system in 1974, village colleges were effectively reduced to secondary modern schools, apart from Sawston which operated both a grammar and a secondary modern scheme. Since 1974 village colleges have returned to their original mission as schools for the whole community. Most of the colleges are now parts of larger, multi-academy trusts.

There are village colleges throughout Cambridgeshire, including Bassingbourn, Bottisham, Comberton, Cottenham, Impington, Linton, Melbourn, Sawston, Soham, Swavesey and Witchford. (Note: There also are institutions called Village Colleges in Gamlingay and Burwell, but these are a middle school and a primary school, respectively.) The most recent, Cambourne Village College, opened in September 2013.

== Bibliography ==
- Henry Morris and the Idea of the Village College Today by Harry Rée, 1971
- Henry Morris, village colleges and community schools
