= Heather Craney =

English actress

Heather Craney (born 1971) is an English actress, known for portraying Joyce Drake in Vera Drake, Alison Weaver in Life of Riley and Emily Holroyd in Torchwood.

== Background ==
Craney was born in Stapleford, Cambridgeshire.

Her family lived in Darlington for two years during the 1980s, where Craney attended Hummersknott School. She attended Stapleford Community Primary School, Sawston Village College and Long Road Sixth Form College in Cambridgeshire, and went on to study English and drama at Liverpool Hope University, graduating in 1992. She trained in Acting and Musical Theatre at the Central School of Speech and Drama, graduating in 1995.

== Career ==
Craney has appeared in the Mike Leigh films Topsy-Turvy (1999), All or Nothing (2002) and Vera Drake (2004), for which she was nominated for the 2005 BAFTA Award for Best Actress in a Supporting Role. Her other film credits include Drinking Crude (1997), Loop (1997) and Dangerous Parking (2007).

On television, Craney played Alison Weaver in the sitcom Life of Riley, and Cheryl Matthews in EastEnders. She also played Emily Holroyd in the Torchwood episode "Fragments". She has also appeared in Silent Witness, The Bill, Holby City and the television films The Mark of Cain and Ahead of the Class. In May 2022, she appeared in an episode of the BBC soap opera Doctors as Sian Corcoran.

Craney's theatre credits include Death of an Elephant, Dangerous Corner, Sugar Mummies, Stoning Mary and Passion Play, at the Donmar Warehouse.

== Filmography ==
List of television performances
Year	Title	Role	Notes
1998	Silent Witness	DI's Receptionist	2 episodes: Divided Loyalties: Parts One and Two
2002	The Bill	Kirsty	1 episode: Episode 058
2005	Ahead of the Class	Nadine	Television film
2005	Holby City	Melissa Finch	1 episode: Bird on a Wire
2007	The Mark of Cain	Brenda Tate	Television film
2007	Coming Up	Sarah	1 episode: In the Dark
2007	Holby City	Amy Bonner	1 episode: Lovers and Madmen
2008	Torchwood	Emily Holroyd	1 episode: Fragments
2009–11	Life of Riley	Alison Weaver	Series regular
2010	Holby City	Lucy Weir	3 episodes: Future Shock, Losing Game, The Most Wonderful Time of the Year
2011	EastEnders	Cheryl Matthews	6 episodes
2012	Line of Duty	DCI Alice Pryor/Prior	2 episodes
2019, 2022	Doctors	Viv Pierce, Sian Corcoran	2 episodes

List of film performances
Year	Title	Role	Notes
1997	Drinking Crude	Julie	
1997	Loop	Cashier	
1999	Topsy-Turvy	Miss Russell	
2002	All or Nothing	Silent Passenger	
2004	Vera Drake	Joyce Drake	Nominated for the BAFTA Award for Best Actress in a Supporting Role
2004	Dangerous Parking	Marlene	
2004	Tales of the Fourth Dimension		Short film
2024	We Live in Time	Buffy Jones	

== Theatre ==
List of stage performances
Year	Production	Venue	Role	Notes
1996	Death of an Elephant	Orange Tree Theatre	Sandra	
1999	Dangerous Corner	Watford Palace Theatre	Olwen	
2000	Passion Play	Donmar Warehouse	Rebecca / Ruth	
2004	Still Life / The Astonished Heart	Liverpool Playhouse	Dolly Messiter	
2005	Stoning Mary	Royal Court Theatre	Ego	
2006	Sugar Mummies	Royal Court Theatre	Kitty	
2007	I Like Mine with a Kiss	Bush Theatre	Annie	
2007	Joe Guy	Soho Theatre	Monique Christie / Helen Blake	
2010	Women, Power and Politics	Tricycle Theatre	Mags / Kim	
2014	Made in Dagenham	Adelphi Theatre	Clare	
2017	Consent	Royal National Theatre	Gayle	
	The Vote			
