= Alfred Spinks =

British chemist and biologist

Alfred Spinks CBE FRS
- Born: 25 February 1917
- Died: 11 February 1982 (aged 64); Wilmslow, England, UK
- Education: Soham Grammar School
- Alma mater: University College, Nottingham
- Spouse: Patricia Kilner
- Children: Carol and Melanie
- Scientific career
- Institutions: ICI at Blackley; Worcester College, Oxford; ICI at Alderley Park
- Doctoral advisor: Ian Heilbron

Alfred Spinks CBE FRS (25 February 1917 – 11 February 1982), was a British chemist and biologist.

== Biography ==
Alfred Spinks was the only child of Alfred Robert Spinks, manager of a Littleport brewery, and Ruth (née Harley). He was born in Littleport on 25 February 1917.

In 1932 Spinks won a scholarship to Soham Grammar School. From there he won an Isle of Ely County Major Scholarship and entered University College, Nottingham. In 1938 he gained the highest chemistry marks of any candidate in the University of London BSc external degree examination. He went to Imperial College, where he worked with A. W. Johnson, under Ian Heilbron, on vitamin A synthesis. He was awarded his PhD in 1940.

That year, both Spinks and Johnson were offered jobs at the Dyestuffs Division of ICI at Blackley. The first two years were spent at Imperial with Heilbron (who was a consultant to the Dyestuffs Division). Spinks then moved to Blackley to begin his industrial career. He was an experimental scientist for the next eight years, and In due course joined the medicinal chemistry section; his main interest was the fate of drugs in the animal body. During this time, the research director Clifford Paine spotted that Spinks's interests and skills lay beyond chemistry, and recommended that he return to academia for a while. This proved to be a two-year course in physiology at Worcester College, Oxford. He enjoyed it so much that he ended up with a first class degree in 1953.

After his return, ICI decided to set up an independent Pharmaceuticals Division at Alderley Park. Spinks was appointed head of the new Biochemistry Department in 1961. His abilities were such that in 1971 he became responsible, on the ICI main board, for all R&D. Spinks retired from the Board of ICI in 1979.

Spinks became president of the Chemical Society in 1979–80. He was elected FRS in 1977 and appointed CBE the following year.

=== Family ===
Alfred Spinks married Patricia Kilner on 19 Dec 1946 at St Mary's Church, Disley. They had two daughters: Carol P in 1947 and Melanie K in 1952.

Alfred Spinks died at his home in Wilmslow on 11 February 1982. He was cremated at Macclesfield Crematorium on 17 February 1982.
