= Cambridge South Hockey Club =

British field hockey club

Cambridge South
- Full name: Cambridge South Hockey Club
- Nickname(s): South, The Southerners
- League: East
- Founded: circa. 1935 as Spicer's Hockey Club
- Home ground: Long Road Sixth Form College; Cambridge

Personnel
- Secretary: John Greaves
- Manager: Neil Sneade
Home	Away

Cambridge South Hockey Club is a hockey club based in Cambridge, England. The club currently runs six men's and six ladies' senior teams competing in the East Region Men's and Women's Leagues respectively, men's and women's masters and indoor teams and a social mixed side. The Juniors section runs age group teams from under-14 to under-8 in Boys, Girls and Mixed formats.

The club has had its home venue at Long Road Sixth Form College, Long Road, Cambridge since autumn 2014. Training is currently offered on Tuesdays for the Men's 1st and 2nd XIs, Wednesdays for Ladies 1sts and 2nds, and Mondays and Thursdays for all other senior teams. Under-12s train on Tuesday evenings, U14s on Wednesdays, with U8s and U10s having a session on Saturday mornings. The club also runs casual mixed sessions on Friday evenings.

During the 2021–22 season the Men's and Ladies 1st XIs both played in Division 1N of their respective leagues.

== History ==
The club was formed in about 1935, originally as a company team for the paper manufacturer Spicers, based in the village of Sawston. At some point the club evolved to become Sawston Hockey Club, still based in the village and playing at the grass pitches owned by Spicers. When league regulations demanded that clubs play their games on artificial pitches, rather than grass, the club moved their home games into Cambridge. The move into the city eventually resulted at the end of the 1997/98 season in the Men's club deciding on a second change of name to Cambridge South Hockey Club, with the Ladies' club following suit the next season.

The move to Long Road triggered a period of rapid expansion for the club, particularly on the Women's side. A Ladies 4th XI was founded in 2017 with 5th and 6th teams following in 2019 and 2020 respectively. 5th and 6th Men's XIs have been added in the same period.
