= Cromwell Community College =

Location
- Wenny Road; Chatteris, Cambridgeshire, PE16 6UU; England; 52.4501°N 0.0527°E

Information
- Type: Academy
- Established: 1939
- Department for Education URN: 138177 Tables
- Ofsted: Reports
- Headteacher: Jane Horn
- Gender: Coeducational
- Age: 4 to 18
- Enrolment: 1,209
- Houses: Darwin, Franklin, Carpenter and Attenborough Forms include Pembroke, Emmanuel, Selwyn, Claire, Kings, Queens, Girton, Darwin and Trinity
- Website: http://www.cromwellcc.org.uk/

Cromwell Community College is a coeducational all-through school and sixth form located in Chatteris, Cambridgeshire, England.

== History ==
Cromwell School was founded in 1939 to serve the town of Chatteris. It grew over the years as it accepted secondary school age pupils from nearby schools that were either closing or turning into primary schools. It turned fully comprehensive in 1969 in line with the Cambridgeshire LEA's switch from the tripartite system to a comprehensive system.

The school previously held Humanities College specialist status, and in 2008 the school was awarded with the Sportsmark. It became an academy in 2012.

An all-weather pitch and changing rooms opened at the school in September 2011. In August 2012, a suite of rooms for Technology and ICT, a new sports hall, as well as a fitness suite and dance studio were opened, and all of these facilities are available for use by the local community outside school hours. The old school buildings were reconstructed into a dining hall and sixth form facility. Two new science laboratories were also constructed, with the whole rebuild completed in September 2013.

In September 2020 the school opened a primary school phase with new buildings completed in 2021. This means that Cromwell Community College is the first state-funded all-through school in Cambridgeshire.

== Academics ==
Cromwell Community College offers GCSEs, Cambridge Nationals and WJEC awards as programmes of study for pupils. Students in the sixth form have the option to study from a range of A Levels, Cambridge Technicals and BTECs.

== Notable former pupils ==
- Dominic Mohan, journalist and newspaper editor
