= Life of Riley (British TV series) =

2009 British comedy television series

- Life of Riley titles for Series 1
- Genre: Sitcom
- Created by: Georgia Pritchett
- Written by: Georgia Pritchett
- Directed by: Martin Dennis
- Starring: Caroline Quentin; Neil Dudgeon
- Opening theme: "The Life of Riley" by The Lightning Seeds
- Composer: Willie Dowling - Jackdaw 4
- Country of origin: United Kingdom
- Original language: English
- No. of series: 3
- No. of episodes: 20

Production
- Executive producers: Alan Tyler; Rosemary MaGowan
- Producer: Catherine Bailey
- Production locations: Pacific Quay Studios, Glasgow, Scotland and 75/73 park avenue south
- Cinematography: John Record
- Editor: Fergus MacKinnon
- Running time: 30 minutes
- Production companies: Catherine Bailey Productions Limited; BBC Scotland

Original release
- Network: BBC One; BBC HD
- Release: 8 January 2009 – 1 June 2011

Life of Riley is a British comedy television series, shown on BBC One and BBC HD that aired for three series between 2009 and 2011. The programme stars Caroline Quentin and Neil Dudgeon as a recently married couple, and is set around their dysfunctional family. The show also features the couple's four children, Danny (Taylor Fawcett), Katy (Lucinda Dryzek), Ted (Patrick Nolan), and Rosie (Ava and Neve Lamb (Series 1), Olivia and Megan Hay (Series 2), Islay And Skye Lavery (Series 3). After three series the show was cancelled.

It is not to be confused with The Life of Riley, a 1940s–1950s radio show, or with a 1950s American television series which starred William Bendix as Chester A. Riley.

== Airing ==
The first episode aired on 8 January 2009, and was shown on Thursdays at 8:00pm on BBC One. Each episode of Life of Riley also aired in high-definition on BBC HD. Series 2 was shown on Wednesdays at 7:30pm from 17 March 2010. Series 3 was shown on Wednesdays at 8:30pm from 13 April 2011.

== Development ==
The six episode series was commissioned by Lucy Lumsden, BBC Controller, Comedy Commissioning. The show was produced by Catherine Bailey Productions Limited for BBC Scotland, and distributed by Outright Distribution Ltd. The show was written by Georgia Pritchett, and filmed at Pacific Quay Studios in Glasgow, Scotland and on location (for example at Joppa, North-East of Edinburgh). Also briefly filmed on 75 Park Avenue South.

The theme music is a cover version of The Lightning Seeds' song "The Life of Riley".

== Plot ==
Jim (Dudgeon) and Maddy Riley are newly-weds. Jim has two children from a previous relationship – teenagers Katy and Danny – whilst Maddy also has a child of her own – Ted – from her previous marriage; baby Rosie is the child of Jim and Maddy. The couple often try to compete with their next-door neighbours, the Weavers, who are the other principal characters in the series.

Series 1 was released on DVD on 29 March 2010. Series 2 was released on DVD on 18 April 2011 along with the transmission of the new series. Series 3 was released on DVD in late 2011.

== Cast ==
- Caroline Quentin as Maddy Riley
- Neil Dudgeon as Jim Riley
- Heather Craney as Alison Weaver
- Lucinda Dryzek as Katy Riley
- Taylor Fawcett as Danny Riley
- Patrick Nolan as Ted Jackson
- Ava and Neve Lamb as Rosie Riley (Series 1)
- Olivia and Megan Hay as Rosie Riley (Series 2)
- Islay and Skye Lavery as Rosie Riley (Series 3)
- John Bell as Anthony Weaver (Series 1 and 2)
- Richard Linnell as Anthony Weaver (Series 3)
- Jordan Clarke as Adam Weaver
- Marcia Warren as Margaret, Maddy's mother
- Richard Lumsden as Roger Weaver
- Jessica Gunning as Babysitter

== Critical reception ==
Reviews for the first series were almost universally negative. The Herald described it as "a palpable flop" and "unfunny in any age". The Daily Telegraph noted that it was "another half-hour firmly on Planet Sitcom: that strange world where people behave not like anybody in real life, but merely like people in other sitcoms". The Daily Record called it a "lazy insult of a comedy". The Northern Echo observed that "there was something missing for a comedy – jokes"; The Daily Mirror comments that there are "some witty moments but these are drowned out by more regular unfunny happenings, so unimaginative and staid it's embarrassing". The Independent headlined its review of the opening episode by calling it "a marital comedy divorced from wit". Most vehemently The Sunday Mail called the show "about as funny as inflamed piles".

The second series of the show was well received by audiences, with viewing figures reaching nearly 6 million, a much higher proportion of the viewing public than the BBC usually receives in this time slot. However, it again received regular negative reviews from critics. The Herald declared that 'it lacked any of the basic ingredients of good sitcom'. The Guardian described the show as a "tired effort" The Scotsman reviewed it by noting that it "feels like a parody, this time of the kind of bland, mechanical, family sitcom they supposedly don't make anymore".

The final series garnered still more negative press comment. The Metro said that the programme was "like a cereal advert that has been spun out into a full-length TV comedy", and that its inoffensive nature felt like being "smothered by cushions"

== Episodes ==
=== Series overview ===
Series	Episodes	Originally released	
Series	Episodes	First released	Last released
1	6	8 January 2009	12 February 2009
2	6	17 March 2010	21 April 2010
3	8	13 April 2011	1 June 2011

=== Series 1 (2009) ===
No. overall	No. in season	Title	Directed by	Written by	Original release date
1	1	"In the Family Way"	Martin Dennis	Georgia Pritchett	8 January 2009
2	2	"New Beginnings"	Martin Dennis	Georgia Pritchett	15 January 2009
3	3	"The Ex Factor"	Martin Dennis	Georgia Pritchett	22 January 2009
4	4	"Beating the Bully"	Martin Dennis	Georgia Pritchett	29 January 2009
5	5	"The Little White Lie"	Martin Dennis	Georgia Pritchett	5 February 2009
6	6	"The Worst Best Man"	Martin Dennis	Georgia Pritchett	12 February 2009

=== Series 2 (2010) ===
No. overall	No. in season	Title	Directed by	Written by	Original release date
7	1	"Just The Two of Us"	Richard Boden	Georgia Pritchett and Paul Alexander	17 March 2010
8	2	"Crowded House"	Richard Boden	Georgia Pritchett	24 March 2010
9	3	"Nine to Five"	Richard Boden	Georgia Pritchett	31 March 2010
10	4	"Is She Really Going Out With Him?"	Richard Boden	Georgia Pritchett, Dan Gaster and Paul Howell	7 April 2010
11	5	"School's Out"	Richard Boden	Georgia Pritchett	14 April 2010
12	6	"Crazy"	Richard Boden	Georgia Pritchett	21 April 2010

=== Series 3 (2011) ===
No. overall	No. in season	Title	Directed by	Written by	Original release date
13	1	"The Boyfriend"	Richard Boden	Georgia Pritchett	13 April 2011
14	2	"Letter of the Law"	Richard Boden	Georgia Pritchett	20 April 2011
15	3	"Interference"	Richard Boden	Dan Gaster, Will Ing and Paul Powell	27 April 2011
16	4	"Snake"	Richard Boden	Georgia Pritchett	4 May 2011
17	5	"Lost in Translation"	Richard Boden	Georgia Pritchett	11 May 2011
18	6	"Absent Friends"	Richard Boden	Daniel Peak	18 May 2011
19	7	"The Bug"	Richard Boden	Dan Gaster, Will Ing and Paul Powell	25 May 2011
20	8	"The Good Mother"	Richard Boden	Georgia Pritchett and Paul Alexander	1 June 2011

== Ratings ==
Episode No.	Airdate	Total Viewers	BBC Weekly Rank
1.1	8 January 2009	5,320,000	16
1.2	15 January 2009	4,930,000	26
1.3	22 January 2009	Under 4,650,000	N/A
1.4	29 January 2009	Under 4,780,000	N/A
1.5	5 February 2009	Under 5,160,000	N/A
1.6	12 February 2009	Under 4,620,000	N/A

Episode No.	Airdate	Total Viewers	BBC Weekly Rank
2.1	17 March 2010	5,930,000	8
2.2	24 March 2010	5,140,000	15
2.3	31 March 2010	5.010,000	15
2.4	7 April 2010	4,790,000	20
2.5	14 April 2010	4,580,000	19
2.6	21 April 2010	5,060,000	16

Episode No.	Airdate	Total Viewers	BBC Weekly Rank
3.1	13 April 2011	4,730,000	16
3.2	20 April 2011	3,010,000	N/A
3.3	27 April 2011	3,890,000	N/A
3.4	4 May 2011	3,280,000	N/A
3.5	11 May 2011	3,700,000	N/A
3.6	18 May 2011	3,010,000	N/A
3.7	25 May 2011	3,430,000	N/A
3.8	1 June 2011	Under 3,320,000	N/A

== International broadcast ==
The series is currently airing on RTÉ One on Sundays in an early morning time slot.
