= Bottisham Village College =

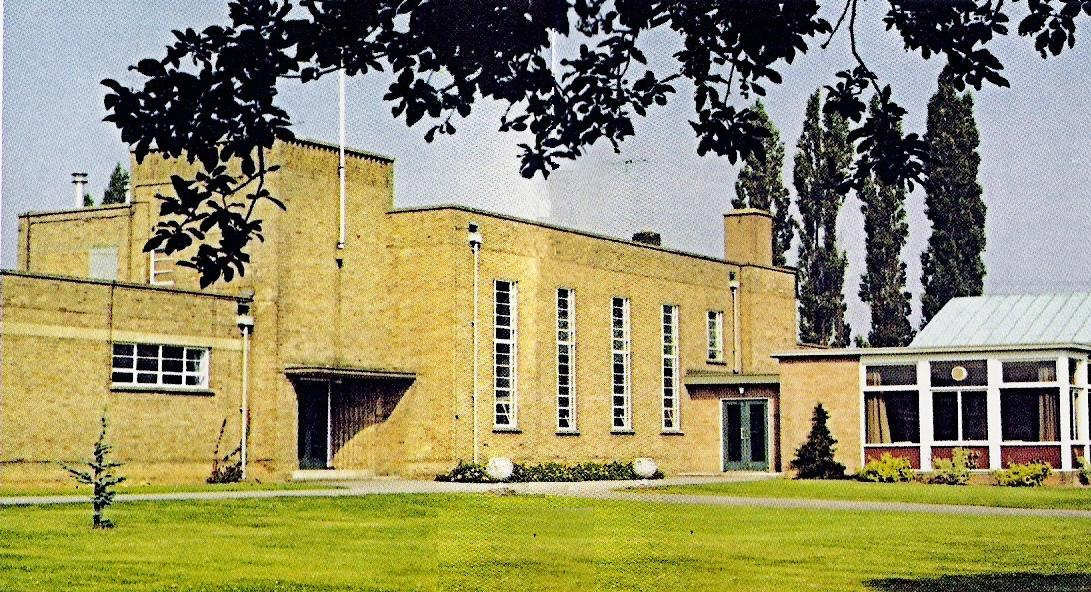

Location
- Lode Road; Bottisham, Cambridgeshire, CB25 9DL; England; 52.2253933°N 0.2545194°E

Information
- Type: Academy
- Motto: Achievement thorugh Inspiring, Caring & Enriching
- Established: 1937
- Founder: Henry Morris
- Local authority: Cambridgeshire
- Department for Education URN: 136677 Tables
- Ofsted: Reports
- Principal: Jenny Rankine till Jan 2027
- Deputy Principal: Dominic Fullman
- Deputy Principal: Ed Compton
- Gender: Mixed
- Age: 11 to 16
- Enrolment: 1,400+ as of October 2026
- Houses: Aether, Aqua, Ignis, Terra, Ventus
- Colours: Bottle Green, Black
- Website: http://www.bottishamvc.org/

Bottisham Village College is a mixed secondary school located in Bottisham, Cambridgeshire, England. The school opened in 1937 as the second village college as a part of the Local Director of Education Henry Morris' vision for providing education for local people in the countryside around Cambridge.

Many classes for adults are offered in the evenings and on the weekends. The school provides education for children aged 11–16 in the local area around Bottisham.

== History ==
Bottisham Village College was designed by local architect Urwin and built by Ambrose of Ely during the 1930s. Originally the school site included both a senior school (secondary school) and a junior school (primary school). The school was opened as a secondary modern on January 1, 1937.

=== Opening ===
The college was officially opened on 6 May 1937 by the Right Honourable Oliver Stanley - President of the Board of Education. Henry Morris and Mr. H. F. B. Fox - His Majesty's Inspector - along with Mr. Stanley and the Earl of Elgin were met at the college by Lord Fairhaven, Chairman of the Managers and the Warden. Mr. Stanley and Lord Elgin met the staff and then inspected the buildings and equipment. At 12:50, the party left the college to have lunch with Lord Fairhaven at Anglesey Abbey. On return to the college, the group was met by a guard of honour consisting of boys and girls of the Senior School and a boy and girl representing the Junior School.

=== 1937 to 1944 ===
In the early days of the Village Colleges, they offered education up to the school-leavging age.

=== 1944 to 1950 ===
With the passage of the Education Act of 1944, the school became a Secondary modern, as part of the Tripartite System. Students who failed (or did not take) an eleven plus exam came to Bottisham where the curriculum was focused on the skills necessary for living in the countryside surrounding Bottisham. Lessons were very gender-based, with boys studying farming, woodwork, sports, science and gardening whilst girls learnt more cookery or needlework. Evening classes for the whole community were equally as varied, with examples including Musical Appreciation, Folk dance classes, woodwork, the operatic society, first aid and Fire Fighting. There were Saturday night dances in the main hall as well. As well as acting as a hall for the school, in the early years of its existence the main hall at Bottisham served as a cinema.

World War II, however, was a testing time for Bottisham Village College, especially with an airforce base in the village. The British and American airmen played a large part in the life of the college, attending school dances but also other functions at the school. Staff stayed up all night on watch on top of the school buildings, watching for incendiaries, and with the rationing of clothing, school uniform was absent from life at the school until 1946. During the nationwide 'Dig for Victory' campaign, the tennis courts, located behind the warden's lawn, were converted to cabbage patches in an attempt to grow as many vegetables as possible.

=== The 1950s ===
In January 1955, Charles Brereton arrived at the school to take up the post of Warden. This was the last appointment of a Village College Warden made personally by Henry Morris before he retired. In his time, Charles Brereton formulated some monumental changes to the school. The fact that he was Warden through the ROSLA to 15 and later to 16 allowed him to see the growth of the college in numbers, from 350 to 850 as well as the extension of buildings, equipment and grounds into the school that it was when he left at the end of 1975. Charles Brereton had spent over 20 years as Warden and to date the longest-serving Warden. In 1996, following his death, there was a memorial service, the planting of a tree and the unveiling of a plaque in the courtyard.

Out-of-school activities for pupils, still uncommon to secondary schools that were not Village Colleges, formed an important part of the lives of pupils during the 1950s with many school sports teams taking part in a variety of inter-school competitions in disciplines such as hockey and athletics. As well as sports, the school had a scout group and a youth group.

At the time, Bottisham was a showplace, only second to Impington for all those influential people who were captivated by Henry Morris' ideas. Consequently, the school received many high-profile visitors including Hugh Dalton and J. B. Priestley.

=== The 1970s and 1980s ===
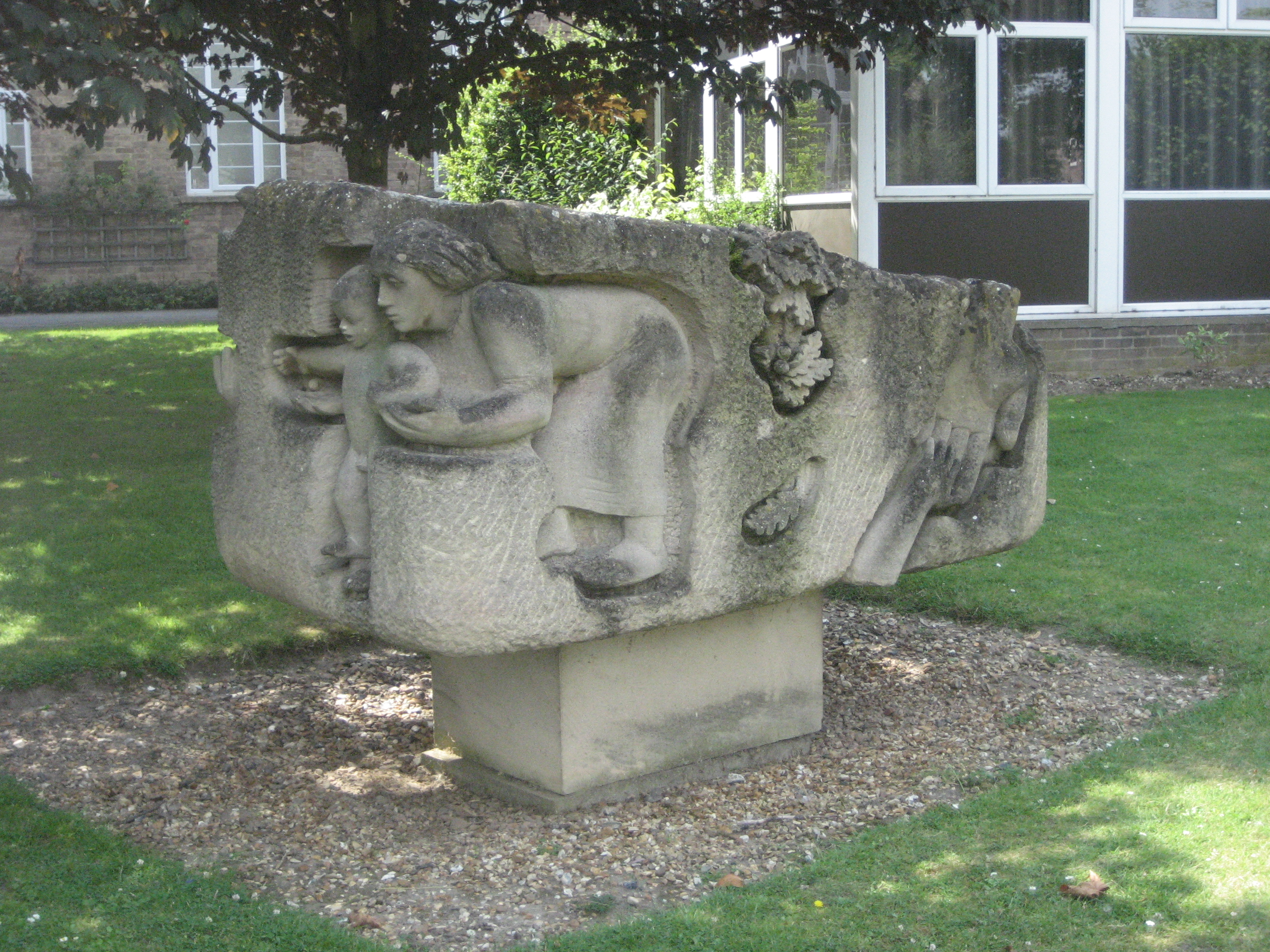
Bottisham Stone by Glynn Williams

The 1970s brought a period of great change for the college, mainly of the remarkable change of the school from a Secondary Modern to a Comprehensive. The school's buildings were extended and upgraded and many new staff were appointed. In five years, the school doubled in size as the catchment area was extended and pupils who previously attended the old Cambridge Grammar school joined Bottisham. However, some drastic cuts hit the Community Education sector the hardest. Evening classes were now expected to be financially self-sufficient. However, Brereton was determined to maintain the spirit of the Village College, an uplifting environment and a caring community. Canings were also phased out and the school embraced instead a new era of technology.

During the 1970s and the 1980s, many new buildings such as the English block, the gymnasium, the technology block (including the drama studio) and the science block were added onto the original school buildings to accommodate the new subjects that would be taught at the school as a comprehensive school. As well as this, in 1976 the college governors opened a new swimming pool, planned in 1971, north of the college. The pool was covered with a large building in 1982 and extended in 1988.

=== The 1990s onwards ===
The school has seen four different faces walk in and out of the Warden's office since Charles Brereton left in 1976, but still, the school holds onto its key values laid out by Henry Morris. More buildings were added during the 1990s, including the maths block, a new community library and a new music block to further the school's facilities. In 1997, the school changed the uniform from blue blazers and ties to a more casual bottle green polo shirt and sweatshirt. In 2004, the school became a Humanities Specialist College, a specialism that increased the amount of funding the school received for the teaching of Humanities thus allowing the school to broaden its teaching of these subjects. The school was then recognised with a High Performing School status, and following a successful Ofsted Inspection, was invited to apply for Applied Learning status in 2009. This introduced additional vocational GCSE and BTEC courses for students in Key Stage 4.

In 2009, the school began construction of a new block on the site that would mirror the original semi-circular buildings of the school and therefore complete the initial plans for the school as they were laid out in 1937. This new building includes a new suite of English classrooms as well as a new purpose-built SEN (Special Educational Needs) unit. Along with new buildings, this has also led to the redevelopment and landscaping of the Warden's lawn as well as the installation of a new sculpture to be designed and constructed by the local sculptor Matt Sanderson.

The school officially opened the new Morris Wing on Saturday, 3 November 2018. Adding to the celebrations was the 80th anniversary of the school's history. The building cost £16.7 million and was constructed in a partnership project between Cambridgeshire County Council and Anglian Learning Trust. The Morris Wing, named in honour of the founder Henry Morris, contains 12 new classrooms, as well as the Evans auditorium (named after departing CEO Kate Evans), a dance studio, a recording studio and practice rooms to be utilized by students.

The Wardens lawn with the new buildings on the right side of the main hall at centre.

==== Trust and academy status ====
The Governing Body of Bottisham Village College proposed a change of school category from community school to foundation school, thus acquiring a Charitable Trust to be called The Bottisham Education Trust, which took effect in September 2010.

The institution had been identified as a High Performing School by the Department for Children, Schools and Families, and the Local Authority was 'fully supportive' of the move towards Trust status for schools. In February 2012, the school converted to academy status. In February 2016 the school became the lead school in Bottisham Multi-Academy Trust, which also includes Netherhall School. In July 2012, the school was rated by Ofsted as "outstanding".

Building Extensions

On November 3, 2018, Bottisham Village College hosted the official opening and naming of the Morris Wing & Evans Auditorium and the opening of the new Community Library.

== Catchment area ==
The Catchment area for Bottisham Village College
Ashley	Bottisham	Burwell
Cheveley	Dullingham	Fen Ditton
Fulbourn	Great Wilbraham	Horningsea
Kirtling	Little Wilbraham	Lode
Quy	Reach	Saxon Street
Six Mile Bottom	Stetchworth	Swaffham Bulbeck
Teversham	Woodditton	Swaffham Prior
