= Swavesey Village College =

Location
- Gibraltar Lane; Cambridge, Cambridgeshire, CB24 4RS; England; 52.2947°N 0.0055°W

Information
- Type: Secondary School
- Established: 1958
- Founder: Henry Morris
- Department for Education URN: 136580 Tables
- Ofsted: Reports
- Head teacher: Jim Stavrou
- Gender: Mixed
- Age range: 11-16
- Houses: Brunel, Cavendish, Newton, Orwell, Pendleton, Wilberforce
- Website: swaveseyvc.co.uk

Swavesey Village College is a village college and academy school in the village of Swavesey in south Cambridgeshire, England. In 2011, Swavesey Village College became an Academy and established the Cambridge Meridian Academies Trust.

As of 2020, the school had 1,292 students. The school was officially opened on 14 November 1958.

== Intake ==
The school has a major intake from the surrounding villages Bar Hill, Over, Papworth Everard, Longstanton and Fenstanton. A few other villages are Fen Drayton, Hilton, Boxworth, Elsworth, Lolworth and Willingham, however not as many students come from these schools. ‌

== Academic information ==
On 11 June 2008, Swavesey Village College became a foundation school within the Swavesey Village College Educational Trust. On 1 April 2011, Swavesey Village College became an academy. The school also has specialisms in science and languages.

Swavesey Village College received a comment of 'outstanding in every respect' from the Ofsted inspectors.‌ The school achieved full marks in every category in the Ofsted report.

In 2021, Swavesey Village College was awarded world-class school status, joining a network of 120 schools in the UK. The quality mark, which is awarded by education charity, world-class schools quality mark (WCSQM), uses an assessment framework to evaluate students on their demonstration and application of world-class skills and competencies. Swavesey Village College was one of 13 secondary schools and eight primary schools to be awarded the quality mark in 2021.

== House System ==
The school is divided into six houses: Brunel, Cavendish, Newton, Orwell, Pendleton and Wilberforce.

All students are assigned to a house, which provides pastoral support and organisation throughout their time at the school. Each house is made up of tutor groups containing students from multiple year groups, forming a vertical tutoring system.

Siblings are typically placed within the same house to support communication between the school and families.
