= Chesterton Community College =

Location
- Gilbert Road; Cambridge, Cambridgeshire, CB4 3NY; England; 52.2174°N 0.12042°E

Information
- Type: Academy
- Established: 1935
- Department for Education URN: 136887 Tables
- Ofsted: Reports
- Chair: Simon Peyton Jones
- Executive Headteacher: Rolf Purvis
- Secondary years taught: Y7-Y13
- Gender: Coeducational
- Age: 11 to 18
- Enrolment: 1129
- Capacity: 1100
- Student to teacher ratio: 14:1
- Language: English
- Hours in school day: 6 hours and 15 minutes
- Houses: Equiano House (blue); Cavendish House (yellow); Hill House (green); Robinson House (red); Fawcett House (purple)
- Website: ccc.tela.org.uk

Chesterton Community College is a co-educational comprehensive secondary school and sixth form with academy status, located in the suburb of Chesterton in Cambridge, England. It was established in 1935 as two separate schools for boys and girls, which merged in 1974 to form a mixed comprehensive school and adult centre. Chesterton was granted community college status in 1983, became an academy in 2011 and opened a sixth form in 2022.

== Background ==
Chesterton Community College is a state non-selective mixed school for pupils aged 11 to 18. Over 90 languages are spoken by Chesterton pupils and over 25% of pupils come from homes where English is not the first language. The staff comprises over 50 teachers, 60 community tutors and 50 support staff. The college received the Investors in People Award in July 1999. The college provides a range of community education to the county, with over 3000 members of the local community using the site each week.

At the Ofsted inspection on 7 July 2007, Chesterton received '1' (Outstanding) mark in all areas of its standards and the latest report in 2026, the same was given to the college

In 2003, the UK television channel Five produced a 13-part television series called Stepping Up, which featured a range of Year 7 pupils at Chesterton Community College, to monitor their transition from primary to secondary education. 'Stepping Up' was broadcast on Five in the spring of 2004, and repeated in full on Teacher's TV at the end of 2007.

== The school buildings ==
The college's main building was built in 1935, when it was separate girls' and boys' secondary modern schools. It contained classrooms and gender-segregated school halls, libraries and offices. In the '60s, it received an enclosed indoor corridor, replacing the outdoor walkway. In 1992, the building changed further: the staff room was knocked through and made into two classrooms, enabling the corridor to run through the whole block. At the top end, the old girls' school library provided a link to the new 1992 extension. A separate gym building was provided at the side for Physical Education, with separate boys' and girls' rooms and changing. This building now houses the school's drama studios. The back playground also featured a large tall wall to separate the boys' and girls' schools. The long filled-in tarmac line in the playground served as a reminder of this, however the playground has since been resurfaced and the line is no longer visible.

In the 1960s, a large new extension was built, providing extra accommodation for the school, now having to cope with both its new status as a comprehensive school and the raising of the school leaving age to 16. The new buildings provided a gym, indoor swimming pool and additional classrooms for art, pottery and other uses. New extensions were added also to the 1935 block, at the side-rear of the two halls.

In 1974, a small block opposite the main building opened, formerly known as the 'ROSLA' (Raising of the School Leaving Age) block. It provided accommodation for the more academically able pupils, as Chesterton was a secondary modern school, for children who did not pass the 11-plus tests, and thus did not become a grammar school. The 'ROSLA' block now houses the school's science department.

In 1992 a new high-tech extension was built to provide the school with a new library, computer facilities, new classrooms, new staff accommodation, and also to provide the school with a new reception and entrance. It was named The Newall Building, after former and now retired principal A. B. Newall. It was designed by Johns Partnership. The science block also received an extension at this time, adding two new classrooms and a preparations room.

Johns Partnership also designed the new music block at the rear of the site, which provided a main performance room, classroom and practice suites. The building was purpose-built and was acoustically engineered. It featured a sundial on the front facade in memory of a former head of mathematics, Terry McConkey.

In 2004, a new sports complex was built, providing a large sports hall, fitness suite, café, changing facilities, function area, floodlit tennis courts and reception area, as well as refurbishment of the existing swimming pool and gym, housed in the adjacent '60s buildings. The new sports centre is also used by the general public. The building was designed by Cambridgeshire County Council Design Team, and cost £2.9 million. The National Lottery, Cambridgeshire County Council and the school donated and raised money for the new building which opened in October 2004 by sports personality and heptathlon athlete, Caroline Pearce. However, the sports centre went into deficit by £150,000 in 2010 resulting in a reduction of public facilities and a dispute between the college and community users.

In July 2019 the school opened an extension. The building was costed at £10 million and was paid for by Cambridgeshire County Council. A sixth form opened at the college in September 2022.

== Notable former pupils ==
- Dina Carroll – singer
- Rebecca Dowbiggin - rowing cox and Commonwealth Rowing Championships medalist
- Nick Mulvey – musician, twice nominated for the Mercury Music Prize

== Notable former staff ==
- Bobby Seagull, broadcaster and mathematician.
