= Comberton Village College =

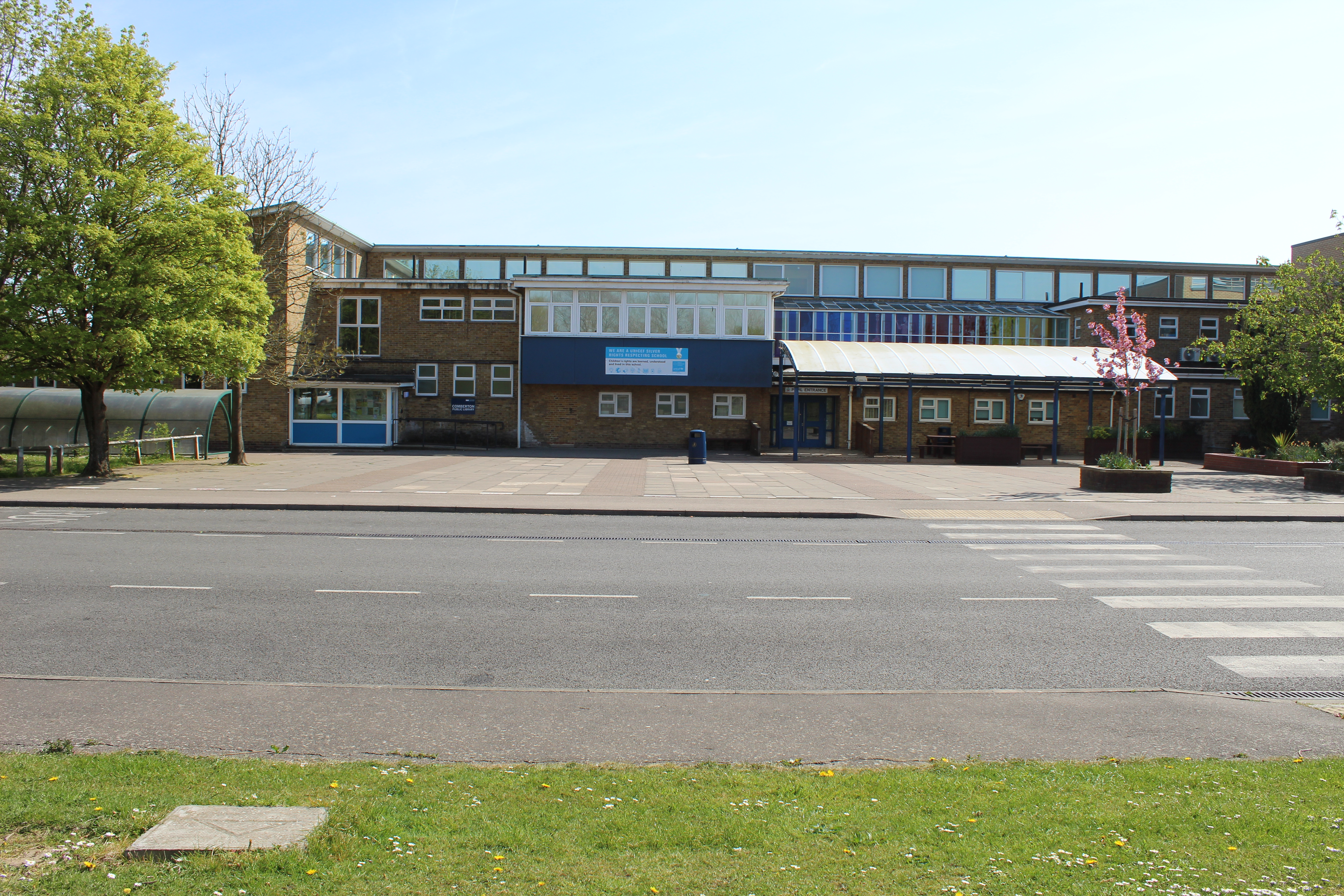

Location
- West Street, Comberton; Cambridge, Cambridgeshire, CB23 7DU; England; 52.1848°N 0.0108°E

Information
- Type: Academy
- Motto: In Nobis
- Established: 1960
- Local authority: Cambridgeshire County Council
- Trust: The Cam Academy Trust
- Department for Education URN: 136463 Tables
- Ofsted: Reports
- Executive Principal: Victoria Hearn
- Gender: Mixed
- Age range: 11–18
- Enrolment: 1,965 (as of 2024))
- Website: www.combertonvc.org

Comberton Village College is an 11–18 mixed secondary school and sixth form with academy status on the edge of Comberton village in Cambridge, Cambridgeshire. It opened in 1960 as a village college.

== History ==
The school was first opened in 1960 by Henry Morris, where it was opened to 330 children and 11 teaching staff. In 1974, the school became fully comprehensive and, in April 1993, it became grant-maintained. It changed to a Foundation School and became a Foundation School with a Trust: the Comberton Educational Trust. The school was granted a presumption to open a new sixth form due to its high-performing status. Capital funding from the Learning and Skills Council was secured to build the required new facilities for a sixth form. The sixth form department of the college opened in September 2011. The new sixth form building was opened by Sir David Bell, permanent secretary for the Department for Education on 14 June 2011.

In February 2011, Comberton Village College became an academy, operated by the Cam Academy Trust. The trust also operates Cambourne Village College which opened in Cambourne in September 2013, and Melbourn Village College in Melbourn, St Peter's School, Hartford Infant and Junior Schools in Huntingdon, Gamlingay First School and Jeavons Wood Primary School in Cambourne. The Gamlingay Village College joined the trust in September 2017.

In January 2016, Comberton Village College were featured in the ITV news for providing teaching resources to Edlumino in order to support the education of refugees in France.

In 2022, the college installed a ground source heat pump, as a ‘first’ in the UK.

== Standards ==
The college was rated Outstanding by Ofsted in all areas in November 2024, and was described in the same report as having designed its curriculum with care, and embedding its inclusive ethos in all part of the school’s work. In 2025, 84% of the college’s GCSE grades lied between 9-4, and 59% of pupils achieved a grade 5 or above in GCSE English and Maths.
