= Netherhall School =

The Netherhall School
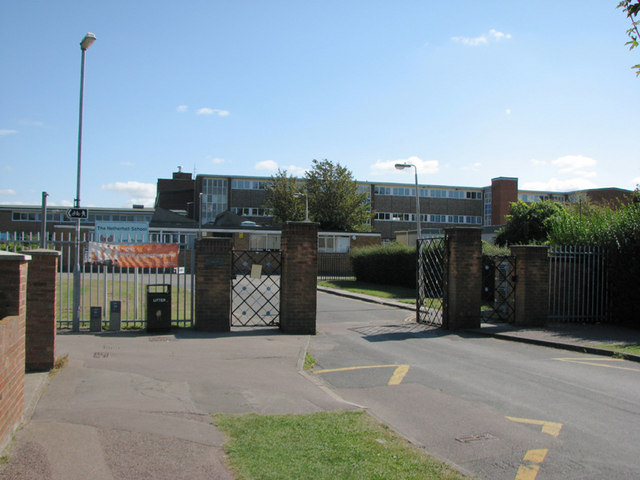
- Netherhall Lower School - geograph.org.uk - 1485259.

Location
- Queen Edith's Way; Cambridge, Cambridgeshire, CB1 8NN; England; 52°10′51″N 0°09′50″E

Information
- Type: Academy
- Established: 1871
- Local authority: Cambridgeshire
- Department for Education URN: 142035 Tables
- Ofsted: Reports
- Chair of Governors: Shelley Monk
- Principal: Chris Tooley
- Gender: Mixed
- Age: 11 to 18
- Enrolment: 1,078 as of January 2016
- Campus size: 35 acres (14 hectares)
- Colours: Red, White
- Website: http://www.netherhall.org/

The Netherhall School and The Oakes College is a mixed secondary school and sixth form located in the Queen Edith ward of Cambridge, England. Its logo is a modified version of the arms of the City of Cambridge. It is one of the largest schools in the area in terms of capacity. Feeder primary schools include Queen Edith, Cherry Hinton Juniors, Fawcett, The Spinney, Morley Memorial, and Colville. It serves the south and east of Cambridge as well as villages which have become considered suburbs such as Cherry Hinton, Teversham, Fulbourn, Great Shelford, Little Shelford and Trumpington.

== The school ==
Netherhall School is divided into the Sixth Form Centre (Years 12–13), Upper School (Years 10–11) and Lower School (Years 7–9). The Upper school site was previously separate from the Lower School site, however after several years of planning they have now been amalgamated on the previous Upper School site.

Sixth Form lessons mainly occur within the Davies Building, which is also used for Maths, English and Art lessons. However, some lessons occur in other parts of the site, such as the two Drama Studios situated in the Glenny Building.

== History ==
=== Secondary modern school ===
It was established as Netherhall Secondary Modern School. It was established in 1871.

=== Comprehensive ===
It took students at the Cambridge Grammar School for Boys to become Netherhall School; a comprehensive school in 1974. Cambridge Grammar School for Girls became Parkside Community College.

== Academic record ==
In 2014, 90% of pupils gained at least 5 GCSEs graded 8 - 5 including English and Maths, a drop from the 2013 results of 73%. These results for 2013 and 2014 are well above the national average and represent improvement on previous years. The 2014 national average on this benchmark was 53.4% and the local authority average was 55.9%. The 2013 national average was 59.2% and the local authority average was 61%

2014 A-level results were slightly below the national average at the higher grades, with 41.3% of grades being 8 - 6 (compared to 52.4% nationally) and 72.5% 8 - 5 (76.7% nationally). The 8 - 3 rate pass rate was slightly above average, at 99.2%, compared to 98.0% nationally. However, all these results were an improvement on the previous 3 years.

== Ofsted Inspections ==
Ofsted's most recent full inspection of Netherhall School in October 2018 found that the school was "good”, an improvement from the school's previous report in June 2014, which deemed the school as "requires improvement". Despite this, in the 2014 report behaviour and safety judgement improved to "mediocre" from the previous inspection. There was an HMI Ofsted monitoring follow-up visit in November 2014. Ofsted had deemed the school to "require improvement" since November 2012 before the school's 2018 inspection. Its last inspection producing a "good" rating before 2018 was in April 2008.

The school became a sponsored academy within the Anglian Learning Trust on 1 February 2016. Since this time significant improvements have been achieved with successive reviews of the school concluding that the school now meets the 'good' threshold.

== Sport ==
Extracurricular sport includes rugby, football, netball, trampolining, table tennis, rounders, hockey, tennis, badminton, athletics, and just dance zoom club.

The Netherhall Sports Centre offers many of the school's indoor and outdoor sports and training facilities to local sports clubs and adult fitness classes.

== Dramatics ==
The Atrium Building Hall is commonly used for productions, conferences and award ceremonies, due to its large seating capacity of 350. A yearly musical production occurs during December, involving Years 7 to 13.In April, Netherhall School hosts the Cambridge School's Shakespeare Festival, consisting of performances by the schools of the Anglian Learning Trust.

== Academy status ==
Previously a foundation school administered by Cambridgeshire County Council, The Netherhall School converted to academy status in February 2016. The school is now part of Bottisham Multi-Academy Trust (which includes Bottisham Village College), but continues to coordinate with Cambridgeshire County Council for admissions. On 1 September 2016 the Bottisham Multi-Academy Trust formed Anglian Learning, a trust formed through the joining of Bottisham Village College, The Netherhall School and Sixth Form Centre, Sawston Village College and Bassingbourn Village College.

== Alumni ==
- Sylvan Ebanks-Blake, footballer
- Kate Madison, actress
- Sean Munro FRS, head of the division of cell biology at the MRC Laboratory of Molecular Biology, Cambridge
- Fiona Onasanya, Labour Member of Parliament for Peterborough from 2017 to 2019 and criminal
- Luke Ward-Wilkinson, actor

=== Cambridge Grammar School for Boys ===
- John Powley, Leader (Conservative) from 1976 to 1979 of Cambridge City Council
- Ronald Searle CBE, cartoonist who created St Trinian's School
- Ian Twinn, Conservative MP from 1983 to 1997 for Edmonton
