= Soham Village College =

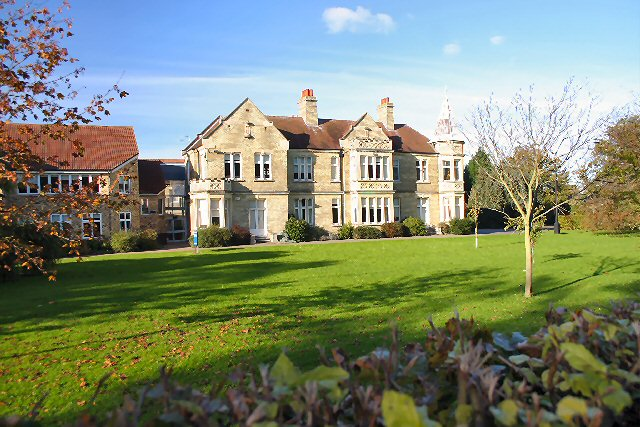

Location
- Sand Street; Soham, Cambridgeshire, CB7 5AA; England; 52°19′47″N 0°20′21″E

Information
- Type: Academy
- Motto: Non nobis sed omnibus ('Not just for us, but for everyone')
- Established: 1958
- Department for Education URN: 136610 Tables
- Headteacher: Jon Hampson
- Gender: Coeducational
- Age: 11 to 16
- Enrolment: 1,350 pupils
- Houses: Osprey, Skylark, Harrier, Merlin
- Colours: Black with red & black tie (yrs 7–10), black with blue tie (yr11), a red tie for Sports Participation, a green tie for musical participation, yellow for art participation, purple tie for senior team and the Headteacher's Tie for exceptional performance
- Publication: Fenside
- Website: www.sohamvc.org

Soham Village College is a secondary school with academy status located in Soham, Cambridgeshire, England. It has around 1,400 pupils, aged 11 to 16. Although its wide catchment area does not include Ely, some pupils from there and its neighbouring villages attend the college. It is split between two adjacent sites: Beechurst, formerly a large house, and Lodeside, built more recently.

== History ==
The college has its origins in Soham Free School, established in 1686. It became known as Soham Grammar School from 1878 and occupied a site on Churchgate Street. In 1925 the grammar school moved to Beechurst House (built in 1901 and located in Sand Street, which had formerly been the home of the late Newmarket jockey, Charles Morbey. The grammar school took boys aged 11–18 from surrounding villages, and also had a few weekly boarders.

The name Soham Village College comes from the former secondary modern style village college, which was established in 1958. The original village college took boys and girls between the ages of 11 and 15, and was built on a 17-acre (69,000 m^{2}) site next to the Soham Lode known as Moat Fields. It took in senior children from a number of "national schools" which were converted to junior or primary schools. The village college system was the brainchild of Henry Morris, the Chief Education Officer at Cambridgeshire County Council. The college was officially opened by the baronet and MP Sir Edward Boyle, a former Minister for Education. Morris's emphasis was on a community-based establishment, and the college was equipped with a public library and a youth leader.

The present village college emerged in 1972 when the modern co-educational village college and the long-established grammar school merged. The merger was a direct result of the government raising the school-leaving age to 16.

Throughout the 1970s, 1980s and 1990s, building work was carried out under the headships of A. E. Lawrence (1972–85) and Dr A. W. Bullock (1985–99). This included the construction of the Ross Peers Sports Centre, a music block, and a science and technology block.

In 1993 the college gained grant-maintained status. This allowed for generous donations, such as the funds donated in the mid-1990s by Simon Gibson to extend the mathematics and English departments (known as the Gibson Block in his honour).

In June 1998, "M Block", which contains science, humanities, ICT and languages rooms, was opened by Princess Margaret.

In August 2002 the school became infamous as the place where a double child-killer, Ian Huntley, worked as school caretaker. Clothing from the murdered children was found in the school grounds, leading to Huntley's arrest and eventual conviction in the Soham murders case. Huntley's house on the school site, and the storage hangar where the clothing was found, were later demolished.

The school was previously a specialist Technology College and Language College before converting to academy status on 1 April 2011.

Since November 2019, a parkrun (a free, weekly timed 5 km run/walk event) has taken place at Soham Village College every Saturday morning at 9.00am.

== Academic reputation ==
In the school's 2010 public exam results, 73 per cent achieved at least five grade A–C GCSEs. The school still attracts pupils from many schools within and outside the catchment area. Many take the opportunity of obtaining extracurricular GCSEs, including astronomy and statistics.

However, pupils wishing to continue onto sixth form studies must change schools, usually attending establishments in nearby Ely or Cambridge.

== Awards ==
Soham Village College has received many awards. Currently the school has specialisms in technology and languages. The college has been awarded the Artsmark – Bronze Award, International School Award, School Achievement Award, Sport England SportsMark Award, Basic Skills Quality Mark, and the ICT Mark for excellence in ICT.

The school awards pupils for various achievements, such as outstanding attendance, distinctive progression and extra-curricular activities out of school, such as sport. Scarlet ties are awarded to pupils who excel in sport, both in school and at county level; emerald ties are awarded to pupils in the performing arts, in school or in county-level performance organisations; gold ties are awarded to pupils in the visual arts, in school or in community events. The Headteacher's Tie is awarded to pupils who display exceptional performance in and out of school.

== Catchment area ==
The school has a wide catchment area, owing to its rural location. Pupils come mainly from the following areas: Soham, Barway, Wicken, Fordham, Isleham, Chippenham, Snailwell, Kennett, and Burwell.

However, some pupils come from other nearby settlements outside of the catchment area including: Stuntney, Ely, Littleport, Newmarket, Little Downham, Witchford, Stretham, Wilburton, and Haddenham.

The principal feeder primary schools are:

- St Andrew's Church of England Primary (Soham)
- The Weatheralls (Soham)
- The Shade School (Soham)
- Fordham Church of England Primary
- Isleham Church of England Primary
- Kennett Primary
- Burwell Village College (Primary)
- Ely St John's (Primary)
- Ely St Mary's (Primary)

== 50th anniversary celebrations (1958–2008) ==
A weekend of celebrations was staged to mark the 50th anniversary of Soham Village College. Between 23 and 25 January 2009, displays of memorabilia and personal souvenirs provided a chronological account of past events and life at the Village College.

== Former pupils ==
=== Soham Grammar School ===
Pupils of the former grammar school are known as Grammarians.

- Robert Aspland, minister
- Leslie Audus, botanist and Second World War veteran
- Martin Brunt, news correspondent
- Fred Hockley, Royal Navy pilot
- Alfred Spinks, chemist and biologist
- John W. R. Taylor, aviation expert
- Victor Watson, children's writer and academic
