= Teversham =

Village in Cambridgeshire, England

Coordinates: 52.20°N 0.19°E

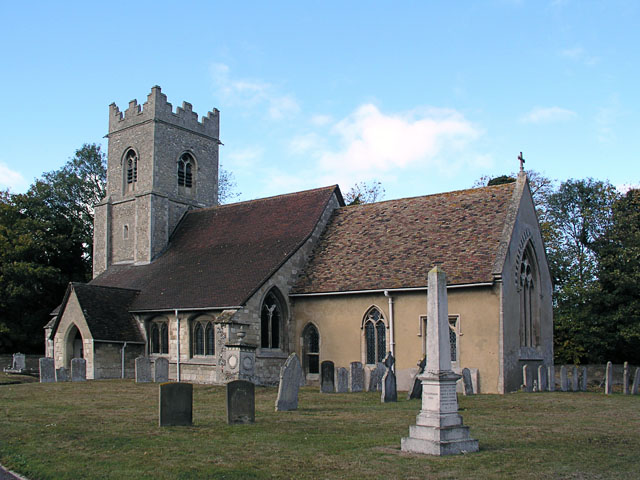
- All Saints' Church, Teversham

- Location within Cambridgeshire
- Population: 2,943 (2011)
- OS grid reference: TL496584
- Civil parish: Teversham
- District: South Cambridgeshire
- Shire county: Cambridgeshire
- Region: East
- Country: England
- Sovereign state: United Kingdom
- Post town: Cambridge
- Postcode district: CB1
- Dialling code: 01223

Teversham is a small village in Cambridgeshire, England, about 2 miles (3 km) from Fulbourn and about 3 miles (5 km) from the centre of Cambridge.

== History ==
Teversham is a small parish that built up just to the south of the Cambridge to Newmarket road; it had only 27 villagers at the time of the Domesday Book in 1086. A quiet arable farming village during medieval times, its recent history has been tied up with that of Cambridge with its growth helping to feed the neighbouring city.

Cambridge City Airport was developed on land in the north-west of the parish as Marshall's car and aircraft business grew in the 1930s.

Known in early medieval times as Teueresham or Teuresham, the village's name perhaps means "village of a man named Tefer".

=== Population ===
At the start of the 19th century Teversham was home to around 35 families, and around 155 people, rising to 238 by 1851. Some emigration, partly to Australia and the US, followed during the 1850s, but numbers recovered, to rise to 286 in 1871. The population was comparatively stable at 250 during the first half of the 20th century.

Post-war building caused rapid growth to 534 residents by 1951, 789 in 1961, 868 by 1981, 1010 by 1986. Further development then doubled the population to 2452 in 1991.

With a parish population of 2665 at the time of the 2001 census, in 2006 the population of Teversham was estimated to be around 2,050, according to the Cambridgeshire Survey. It is a significant growth from 1957, when the population was 780, according to surveys at the time. Around 2005 a housing development took place which greatly increased the population in time for the survey. At the 2011 census the population 2,943.

== Church ==
The church is considered 'ancient', dating back to an estimated 910, and even by the time of the Domesday survey was one of the few listed in Cambridgeshire as a whole. It has been dedicated to All Saints since its reconsecration in 1393. The church consists of a chancel, an aisled nave, west tower, and south porch. The earliest parts of the present building and its octagonal font date from the early 13th century.

Teversham also has a small non-conformist chapel in the High Street built for the use of 'Protestant Dissenters' in 1858. An independent evangelical church, Hope Community Church, started using the chapel for public worship in 2009.

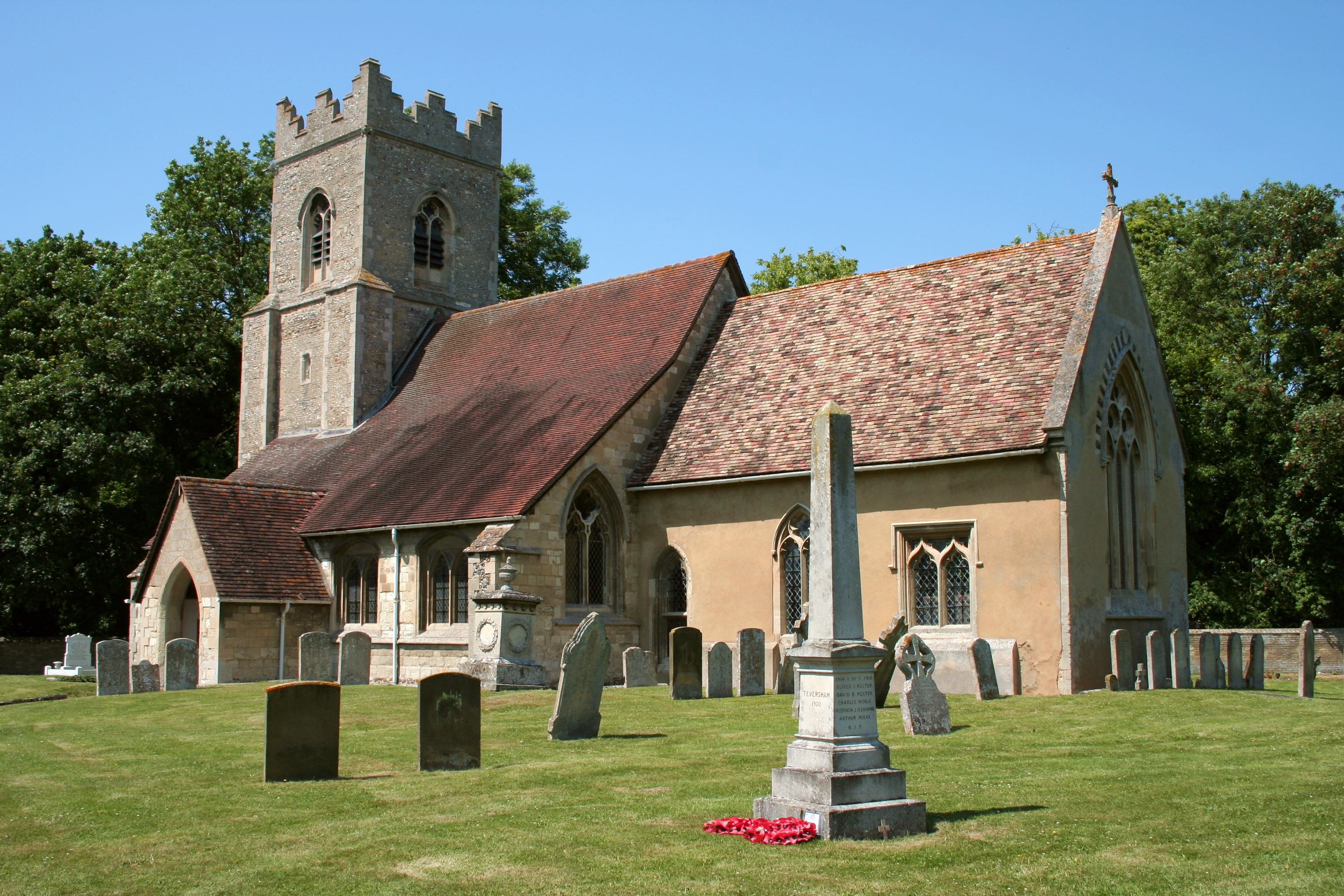
The Parish Church of All Saints

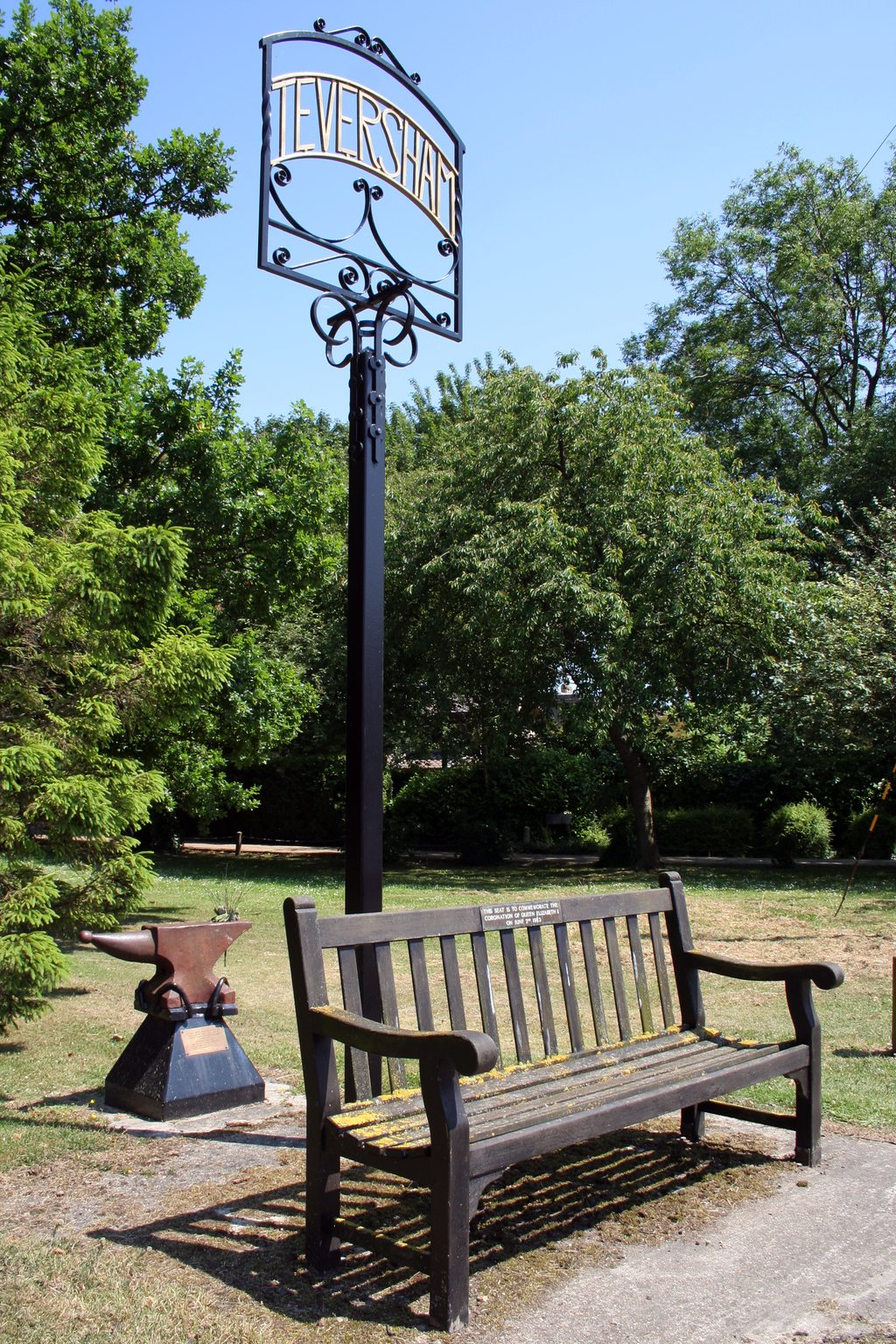
Teversham village sign

== Village life ==
Teversham has a primary school, a parish church, a Victorian chapel, Social Club and an Indian restaurant. There are 3 parks in the village; a recreation ground with football facilities on the south side of the village and two other parks with children's play equipment amongst some of the newer housing developments in the north of the village. Children initially attend Teversham Church of England Primary School in the village and are in the catchment area for Bottisham Village College.

The village's only pub, the Rose and Crown, situated at the main intersection on the High Street closed down and remained vacant until summer 2008 when it underwent full refurbishment as an Indian restaurant. Teversham's shop, with post office within it, closed on Christmas Eve 1999 and the post office section on 12 February 2000.

== Notable inhabitants ==
After 1560 the rectory was held by a string of eminent clergymen. John Whitgift, later Archbishop of Canterbury, was rector of Teversham from 1560 to 1572, as was Richard Bancroft, rector 1576–86, who succeeded him as Archbishop. Matthew Wren, Bishop of Ely and Norwich was rector 1615–35, and Joseph Beaumont, master of Peterhouse, Cambridge, held the rectory from 1664 to 1699. In many cases the rectors were resident in college in Cambridge and hired a curate to oversee the church.

Lady Jermy Way commemorates local benefactress Lady Joan Jermy (d.1649), whose will provided for alms and education for the poor of the parish.

Richard Corney Grain, Victorian era entertainer and songwriter, was born in Teversham in 1844.

Although not an inhabitant of the village, the Baptist minister Charles Haddon Spurgeon preached his first public sermon in Teversham to a small gathering of local people in a cottage in the High Street in the winter of 1850-51. The location is commemorated with a plaque on the cottage, although the room in which the church fellowship gathered no longer exists.
