= Cottenham Village College =

Location
- High Street; Cottenham, Cambridgeshire, CB24 8UA; England
- Coordinates: 52.2821°N 0.1253°E

Information
- Type: Academy
- Founded: January 2009; 17 years ago
- Department for Education URN: 137434 Tables
- Ofsted: Reports
- Principal: Zoe Andrews
- Gender: Mixed
- Age: 11 to 16
- Website: http://www.astreacottenham.org

Cottenham Village College is an academy school located in Cottenham, Cambridgeshire, England. The school offers secondary education to pupils from the surrounding area. In addition, as part of Cambridgeshire's village college structure, Cottenham offers Adult education courses and leisure facilities for the local community. The school has a capacity of 900 pupils.

Cottenham Village College and The Centre School were run by the Cottenham Academy Trust. However, the Trust was then taken over by the Astrea Academy Trust based in Sheffield.

Cottenham Village College primarily serves 11–16 year olds in the villages of Cottenham, Waterbeach and Willingham. The college is non-selective and takes students of all abilities, following the Local Authority's admission policy and procedures.

== The Centre School ==
The Centre School is also located on the Cottenham Village College site. It is a SMEH special school with capacity for 134 students aged 11 to 19 from across Cambridgeshire. The school opened in January 2009.
