= Cambourne Village College =

Location
- Sheepfold Lane; Cambourne, Cambridgeshire, CB23 6FR; England; 52.22436°N 0.08235°W

Information
- Type: Free school
- Established: 2013
- Department for Education URN: 139408 Tables
- Ofsted: Reports
- Executive Principal: Stephen Munday CBE
- Gender: Mixed
- Age: 11 to 16
- Website: www.cambournevc.org

Cambourne Village College is a mixed secondary school located in Cambourne, Cambridgeshire, England. It is a free school that opened in 2013, and is part of a federation with Comberton Village College operating within the Cam Academy Trust.

Cambourne Village College had an initial intake of Year 7 pupils (11- and 12-year-olds) in September 2013, but expanded each year with a new Year 7 intake to become a full secondary school. The school's primary catchment area is Cambourne, and largely admits pupils from Jeavons Wood Primary School, Monkfield Park Primary School, Hardwick and Cambourne Community Primary School and The Vine Inter-Church School in Cambourne.

The school is located at a purpose-built campus in the north-west of Lower Cambourne. The school has is also available for use by the local community, in common with the Village College tradition in Cambridgeshire. It is the first and currently only secondary school to be established in Cambourne.

The school has the capacity to accommodate 1250 pupils and 100 staff, and is currently overcapacity with 1626 pupils.

A second campus of the Hardwick and Cambourne Community Primary School was built on the same site to replace the previous temporary campus.

In May 2015, Cambourne Village College was judged to be "outstanding" by Ofsted.
