= Melbourn Village College =

Location
- The Moor; Melbourn, Cambridgeshire, SG8 6EF; England; 52.087549°N 0.018218°E

Information
- Type: Academy
- Motto: Everybody is Somebody
- Trust: The Cam Academy Trust
- Department for Education URN: 137527 Tables
- Ofsted: Reports
- Executive Principal: Rachel Spencer
- Gender: Co-educational
- Age: 11 to 16
- Enrolment: 600+
- Houses: Darwin, Franklin, Newton, Lewis, Hawking, Goodall
- Colours: Blue, Gold
- Website: https://www.melbournvc.org/

Melbourn Village College is a secondary school with academy status, located in Melbourn, Cambridgeshire, England that serves an extensive area of South Cambridgeshire. The school has over 600 students aged 11–16. Melbourn Village College is part of the Cam Academy Trust as of September 1, 2013. The Cam Academy Trust now comprises Comberton Village College, Comberton Sixth Form, Cambourne Village College, Melbourn Village College, St Peter's School Huntingdon, as well as several primary schools. Cambourne Sixth Form issue to open in September 2024.

== History ==
=== Secondary modern school ===
It was officially opened on 11 December 1959 by the Conservative Minister of Education, Sir David Eccles, with the Bishop of Ely. The school was the eighth in the Cambridgeshire 'series' of village colleges. At the opening, the Minister of Education advocated a big expansion of youth services across the UK. The Warden was Arthur Behenna, later headteacher of Lincoln Christ's Hospital School from 1973; he died on 23 September 2014, aged 91.

Queen Elizabeth The Queen Mother visited in 1960. In December 1962 the prizes were given out by Bernard Faithfull-Davies, who co-founded Children's Relief International. In December 1963 Alexander Edward Howard, headmaster of Wandsworth School, handed out the prizes at the speech day.

40-year-old Ronald Peer, assistant head of Soham Village College, took over as headteacher in 1969. There were 400 at the school in 1969, with around 950 predicted by the early 1980s.

=== Comprehensive ===
The new heads of comprehensive schools for 1974 were announced by the Cambridgeshire and Isle of Ely education committee in November 1972. The school would become comprehensive in 1974.

In 2006 59% of students obtained 5 or more A*-C GCSEs including English and mathematics, rising to 63% if those two subjects are excluded.

In the most recent full Ofsted inspection in 2023, Melbourn Village College was rated Inadequate, with the inspector noting that while students "achieve adequately in Year 11 examinations, less attention is paid to addressing weaknesses in the depth and breadth of their knowledge". In their response, the school branded the report as "disappointing" and Executive Headteacher Christopher Bennet commented that "the most recent GCSE results were exceptional, demonstrating the high standards and achievements students make at the school." In an earlier news update, Bennet described the school's 2023 GCSE standards as "at least the same as those gained in 2019", the year in which 39% of students achieved less than a grade 4 in English and/or Maths.

== Curriculum ==
The following subjects are offered/taught: English, Maths (plus Further Maths in Year 11), Science, Geography, History, Religious Education, Food Technology, Design & Technology, Art, Physical Education, Mandarin, Spanish, Music, Drama, Computer Science and Psychology .

== Funding ==
In January 2000 the Secondary Heads Association used this school as an example of the disparity of funding between local authorities. If the school had been in Hertfordshire, two miles away, it would have received £359,000 more for its students. By November 2005 the school was £148,814 in debt. As of September 2023, the school is setting a break-even budget.

== Notable staff ==
In 1998 Judith Mullen, then warden of the College, was appointed president of the Secondary Heads Association.

In April 2006 Nicola Dunklin, a teaching assistant, set up the South Cambridgeshire branch of the charity, Friends of Chernobyl's Children.

== Notable former pupils ==
- Luke Chadwick, professional football player
- Daniel Goodfellow, Olympic bronze medalist at Rio 2016
- Duncan Bellamy, musician - member of Mercury Music Prize nominated band Portico Quartet
