= Witchford Village College =

Location
- Manor Road; Witchford, Cambridgeshire, CB6 2JA; England; 52°23′27″N 0°12′43″E

Information
- Type: Academy
- Local authority: Cambridgeshire
- Department for Education URN: 137547 Tables
- Ofsted: Reports
- Chair of Governors: Laura Owens
- Executive Headteacher: Nick Harrison
- Staff: 30 (Estimate)
- Gender: Coeducational
- Age: 11 to 16
- Enrolment: 824 (as of 2016)
- Website: https://wvc.tela.org.uk/

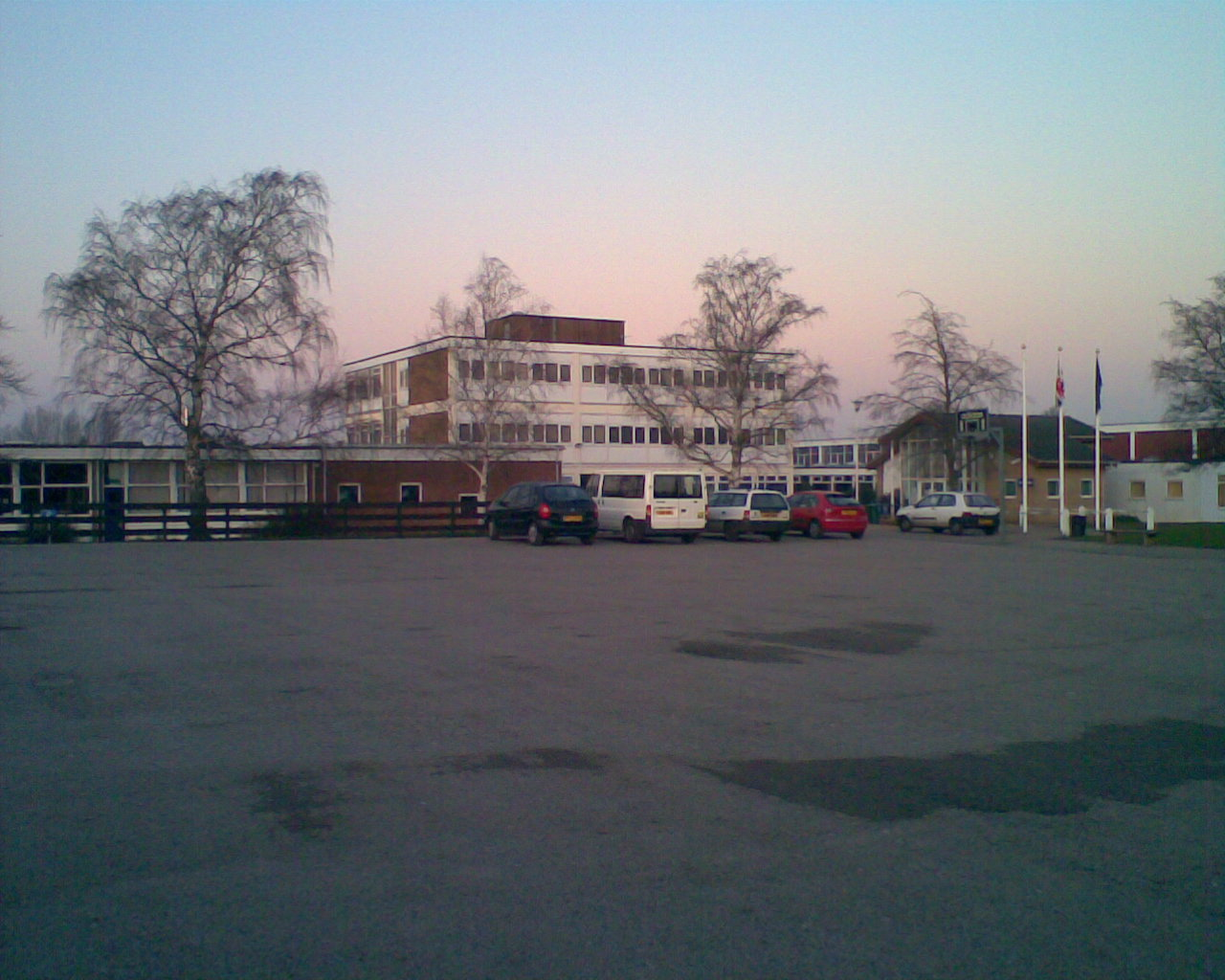
Witchford Village College, 2008

Witchford Village College (sometimes abbreviated to W.V.C.) is a secondary school in the village of Witchford, near Ely, Cambridgeshire, England. Before becoming an academy, the school was a specialist Sports College. With approximately 820 pupils on roll, the college has fewer pupils than the national average (~950).

== About the college ==
Witchford Village College is situated on the edge of the village of Witchford, close to the city of Ely.

The College site provides facilities for a wide range of activities, with a specialty in sports. There are teaching rooms, a large Library/Resource Centre, an Assembly Hall with Dining annex, six Science Laboratories, a Sports Halls and Gymnasium and specialist rooms for Drama, Music, and Communication Technology (ICT). In quite recent years over £3 million has been spent on building extensions at the College because of growth in student numbers. New areas include a Design and Technology area, Art and Design rooms, a Ceramics studio, a display exhibition gallery, new ICT suites, and revamped science labs.

Continued growth in demand for student places at the College has meant that an additional English teaching block containing six classrooms, new Special Needs Accommodation (commonly referred to as the SEND department) an additional Laboratory and a new Art and Design room were opened.

In September 2004 a fitness studio was opened. A major development in September 2006 was the complete upgrading of four ICT suites and the installation of Interactive Whiteboards in over 25 classrooms. A majority of this interactive equipment has been replaced as of October 2026.

In 2011, the school became an academy.

Plans for summer 2014 included the refurbishment of the Food Technology classrooms and new tennis courts. These measures were brought into place, however two of the tennis courts are restricted from student access.

However, as of 2023, a PE teacher by the name of Courtney Pettifor was found guilty of gross misconduct and banned from teaching after sending thousands of suggestive email to under age girls. These included "I'll run past your window every day up until Sunday from now, just for you x" along with referring to students with endearing terms such as "babe" and "sweetheart".

== Catchment area ==
Witchford College serves students living predominantly in East Cambridgeshire. The catchment area of the school includes:

- Aldreth
- Coveney
- Haddenham
- Little Thetford
- Mepal
- Sutton
- Stretham
- Wardy Hill
- Wilburton
- Witcham
- Witchford

== Ofsted ==
An October 2016 Ofsted inspection rated the school overall as 'Good'. According to the report: In 2015, the college met the government’s floor standards, which set the minimum expectations for pupils' attainment and progress at GCSE.

== Partner schools ==
Witchford Village College used to have one partner school, with which student exchange trips would take place. The school is as follows:

- Netherlands Anna van Rijn School.

However, these exchange trips no longer take place, and interschool contact with Anna van Rijn School no longer occurs.
