= St Bede's Inter-Church School =

Location
- Birdwood Road; Cambridge, Cambridgeshire, CB1 3TD; England
- Coordinates: 52°11′26″N 0°09′45″E

Information
- Type: Academy
- Motto: "Cum Deo" (Latin for "With God")
- Religious affiliation: Church of England/Roman Catholic
- Established: 1962, 1988
- Local authority: Cambridgeshire
- Specialist: Humanities College
- Ofsted: Reports
- Headteacher: A Day
- Staff: 50
- Gender: Coeducational
- Age: 11 to 16
- Enrolment: 750
- Website: Official website

St Bede's Inter-Church School (formerly St Bede's Inter-Church Comprehensive School) is the only Christian state secondary school in Cambridgeshire. It is an academy school with support from both the Roman Catholic Diocese of East Anglia and Anglican Diocese of Ely. The school currently has around 750 pupils and around 50 staff. In 2024, the school was designated as "outstanding" by Ofsted in all areas.

== History ==
St Bede's opened in 1962 as a small Roman Catholic secondary school housed in one central building, under the leadership of headmaster K.G. Kent and around 18 nuns teaching and running the school. Over the years, the school began to admit students from other Christian denominations, notably the Anglican Church. In the light of the increasing ecumenical co-operation between the Roman Catholic and Anglican churches the school was closed, re-opening in 1988 as a joint Catholic/Anglican foundation, St Bedes Inter-Church Comprehensive School, retaining most of the original staff, including the nuns, but with a new management.

Since then the school has expanded and additional buildings have been added; first a technology block, housing Food Technology, Textiles Technology and Design Technology, although now also hosts Information Technology; then the St Etheldreda block, a suite of 12 general-purpose classrooms (the "B Block") in 1995. Three science laboratories were refurbished in 2001; in 2003, four new English classrooms, a purpose built drama and dance studio and purpose built music rooms were added and in 2005 a state of the art Sports Hall including teaching rooms and tennis courts brought the school to its present state. Due to the increasing popularity and expansion of the school the site continued to need mobile classrooms to cope with the demand for teaching space. The latest £4m development began in August 2008, aiming to replace all mobile classrooms with six teaching rooms, two new art rooms and a digital media centre, a chaplaincy and more refurbished science labs. The new Art and Chaplaincy building has been connected to the technology and English/music/drama building to create one large building which can be walked through when raining; covered walkways will be added between the main block and "B" block, the only building which now stands alone.

The school gained Humanities Specialist Status in September 2005 with History as the lead subject and Geography/Religious Education in support. In 2009 the school was invited to apply for a second specialism in light of the school's success in the Humanities department. The choice was Maths & Computing: the Maths department had previously been nominated as a consultant Maths department.

The school converted to academy status in August 2012.

On September 17, 2025, the community of St Bede's gathered together to celebrate the opening of the new chapel and music block.

== Ofsted ==
In 2004, 2007, 2011 and 2013 the school was inspected by Ofsted and was judged to be "satisfactory", "good", "outstanding" and "outstanding", respectively. (Note: Ofsted grades schools as either "inadequate", "requires improvement" (formerly "satisfactory"), "good", or "outstanding".) In 2024, the school was designated as "outstanding" by Ofsted in all areas.
