= Linton Village College =

Linton Village College.
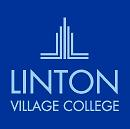

Location
- Cambridge Road; Linton, Cambridgeshire, CB21 4JB; England; 52°05′55″N 0°16′19″E

Information
- Type: Academy
- Established: 1937
- Local authority: Cambridgeshire
- Specialist: Business and Enterprise College
- Department for Education URN: 136442 Tables
- Ofsted: Reports
- Chair: John Batchelor
- Headteacher: Helena Marsh
- Gender: Coeducational
- Age: 11 to 16
- Enrolment: 832
- Colour: Royal blue
- Website: http://www.lvc.org

Linton Village College (LVC) is a secondary school in Linton, South Cambridgeshire, England. Established in 1937 as a village college, the school now has academy status and forms a part of the Anglian Learning trust.

The school has specialisms in Applied Learning and Creative Arts.
