= Bassingbourn Village College =

Location
- South End; Bassingbourn; Royston, Hertfordshire, SG8 5NJ; England; 52.07543°N 0.05959°W

Information
- Type: Academy
- Established: 1969
- Local authority: Cambridgeshire
- Specialist: Technology / creative arts
- Department for Education URN: 137427 Tables
- Ofsted: Reports
- Head teacher: Ian Stoneham
- Gender: Coeducational
- Age: 11 to 16
- Enrolment: 666 As of 2024
- Capacity: 625
- Houses: Artemis, Athena, Hercules, Atalanta
- Colours: Burgundy and gold
- Website: www.bassingbournvc.net

Bassingbourn Village College is an academy school in Bassingbourn, just across the Cambridgeshire border from Royston, Hertfordshire. As of 2024 it has 666 students. The college teaches students from Year 7 to Year 11. It is part of the Anglian Learning academy trust.

Bassingbourn Village College was rated "good" by Ofsted in 2023 and the majority (90%) of school leavers continue in education.

The college is divided into four houses: Artemis, Athena, Hercules, Atalanta.

== Notable alumni ==
- Fraser Dingwall, rugby player
