= Impington Village College =

School in Cambridgeshire, England

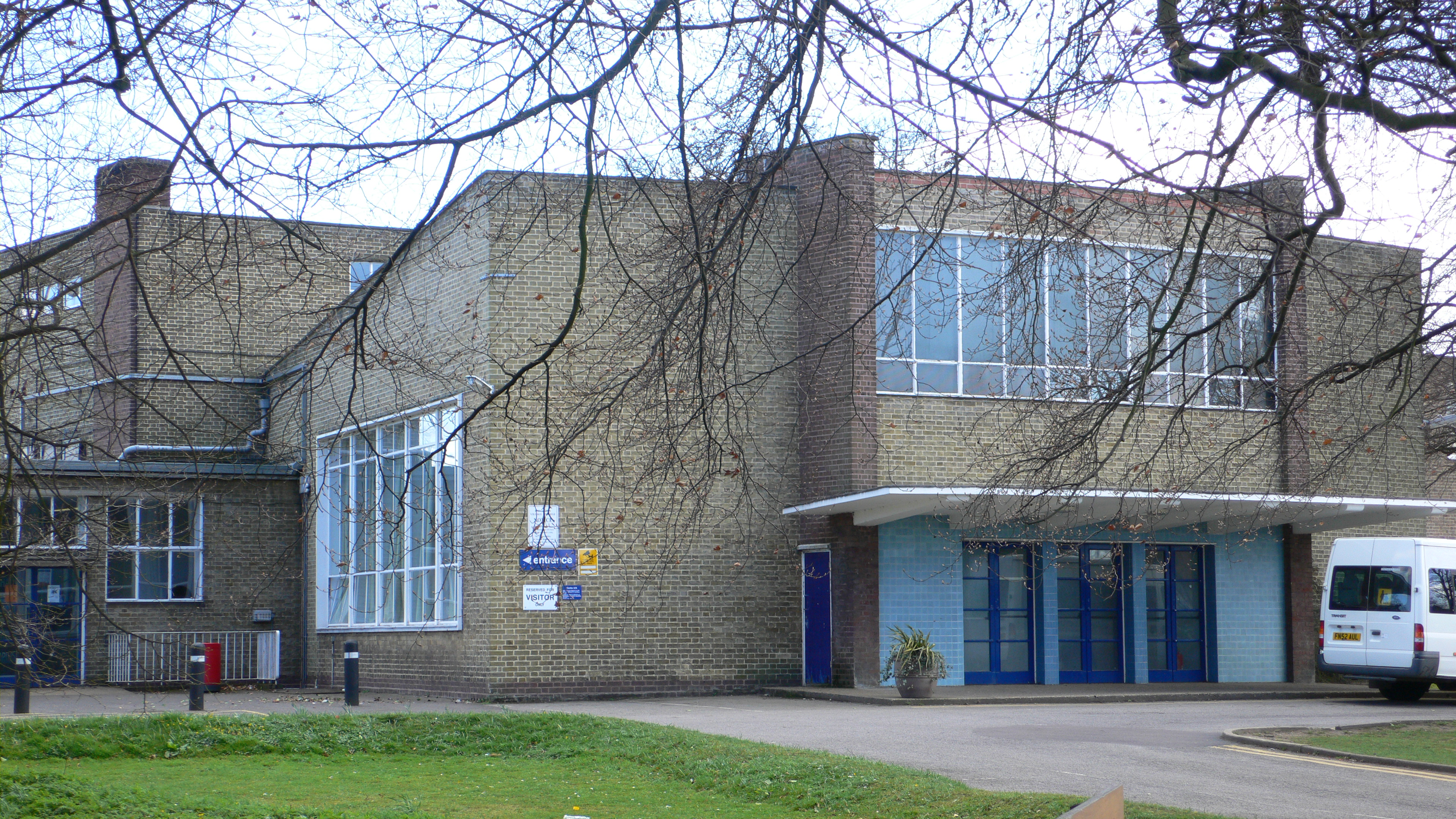
- The school in 2006

Location
- New Road; Impington, Cambridgeshire, CB24 9LX; England; 52.2471°N 0.1166°E

Information
- Type: Academy
- Established: 1939
- Department for Education URN: 137826 Tables
- Ofsted: Reports
- Principal: Johanna Sale
- Gender: Mixed
- Age: 11 to 18
- Enrolment: 1,324
- Website: https://www.impington.cambs.sch.uk

Impington Village College is a co-educational comprehensive secondary school and sixth form with academy status, located in Impington in Cambridgeshire, England. The buildings of 1938–1939 by Walter Gropius and Maxwell Fry are Grade I listed.

The school opened in 1939, two weeks after the outbreak of World War II. It was the fourth village college to be opened in Cambridgeshire. As a village college, it was originally intended to encompass all aspects of learning in the village, and included prominent space for adult education and the First Histon Scouts, who are now based in a hut on the grounds of the college.

In 1998 the school was awarded the Sportsmark by Sport England and was also granted international school status by the British Council's central bureau for education visits and exchanges, the first of eleven schools to be designated that way. In September 1999 it built on this with a successful application to the Department of Education to become a specialist Language College. The school became a standalone academy in 2012.

Impington Village College became the Morris Education Trust (MET) in 2016. In 2020, the Cambridgeshire Educational Trust (CET) merged into MET to become Eastern Learning Alliance (ELA).

== Building ==
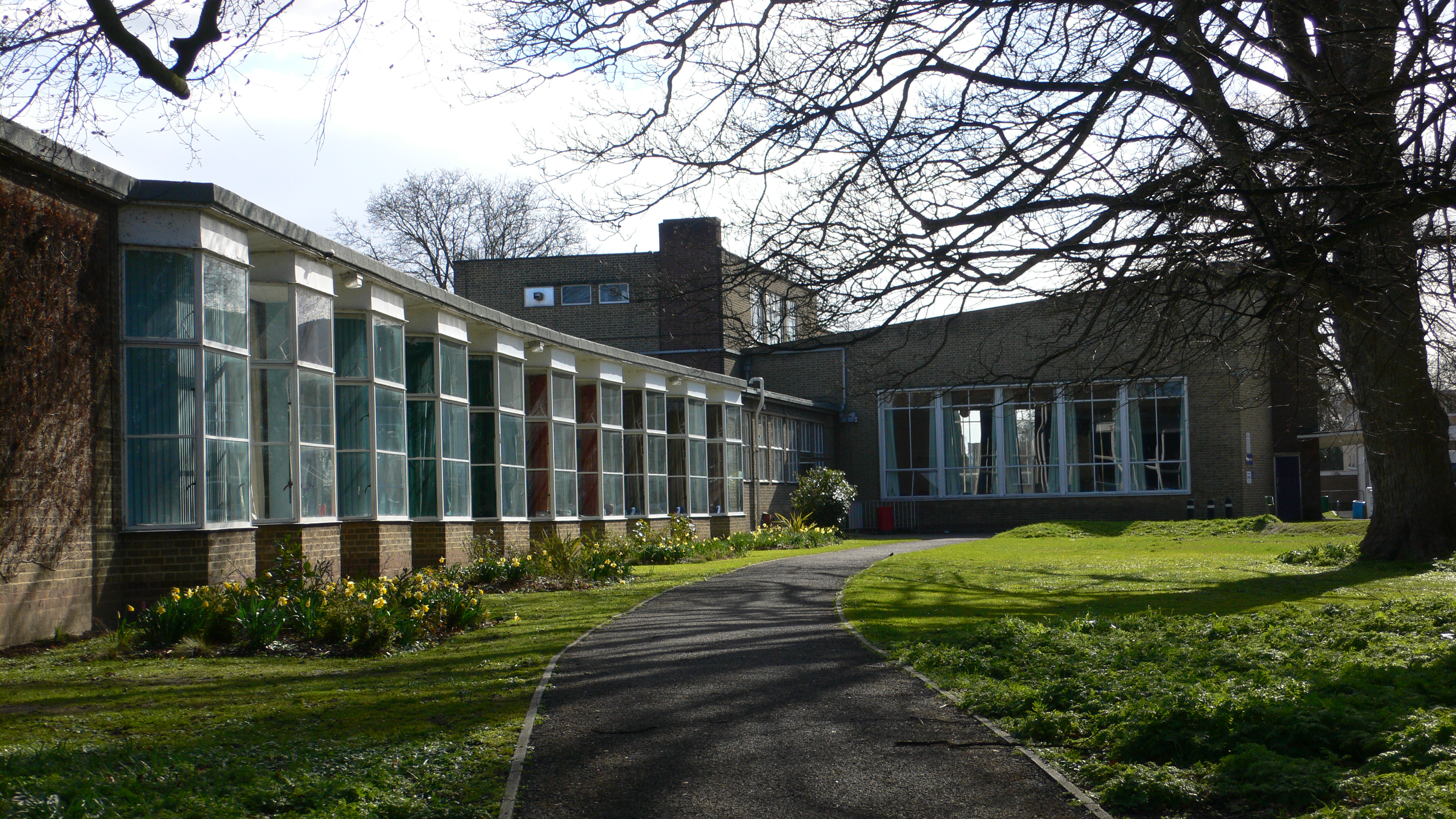
Adult education wing of the college in 2006

Henry Morris, founder of the village college system in Cambridgeshire, employed prominent architects to design the colleges, and Impington was designed by Walter Gropius, founder of The Bauhaus School of Architecture, and his partner Maxwell Fry. It is the only example of Gropius's work in Britain and the building is now Grade I listed building. In 2014, the college received a £100,000 grant from the Heritage Lottery Fund for important repair and restoration works to the listed part of the site. Work began in the August of that year.

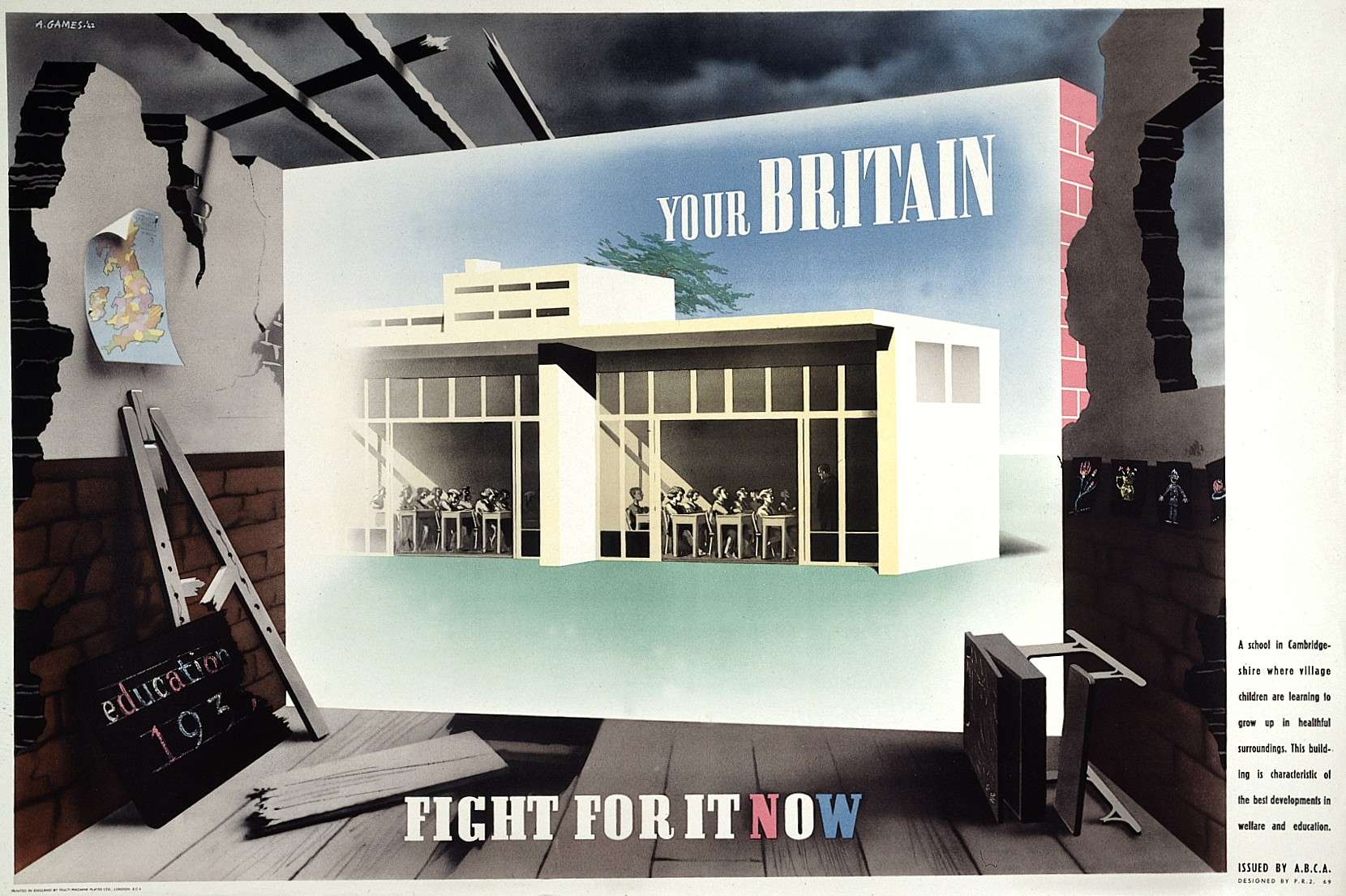
A modern school contrasted with an old school. Colour lithograph after Abram Games, 1942.

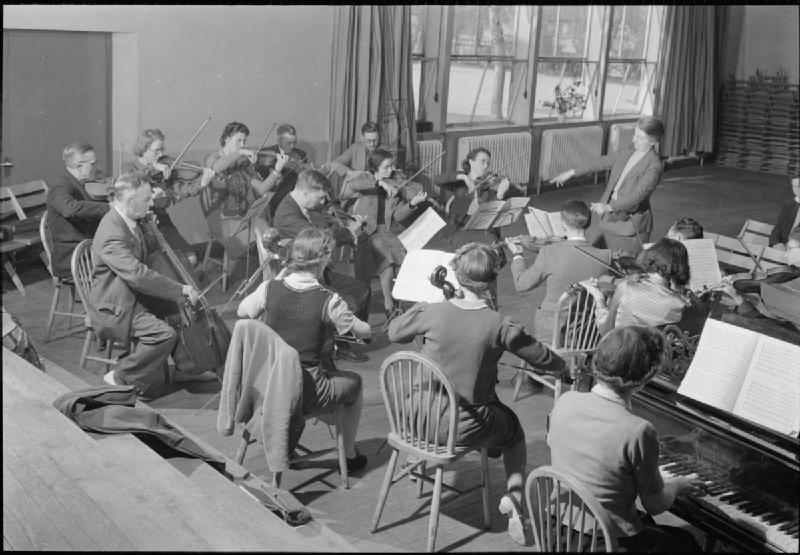
Music students at Impington College in 1944.

== House system ==
Starting in the 2014/15 academic year, the college introduced a house system for pastoral care in years 7–11. These houses were named after Helen Keller, Rosa Parks, Alan Turing and Raoul Wallenberg. The following year, a vertical tutoring system began, based around these houses.

== Impington International College ==
Impington Village College has an international sixth form, educating pupils aged 16–19 from a mix of nations and cultures. The sixth form offers the International Baccalaureate Diploma Programme. It also offers its own course called 'Ideal' which is for students with learning difficulties and teaches them essential life skills, as well as some basic qualifications. Impington has also offered an extra year for year 13 performance students, helping them apply for drama school and audition for companies.

== Ofsted intervention ==
Impington was operating a two year Key Stage 3, where pupils are required to experience 'broad and balanced curriculum', as well as spending three years training for the GCSE examinations.

During a Section 8 inspection in November 2019, Ofsted informed them that it was not possible to be considered for the 'Outstanding' grade using such a model. This has had consequences for other schools and academies across the country.
