= Preston Bagot =

Village in Warwickshire, England

Coordinates: 52.291873°N 1.752173°W

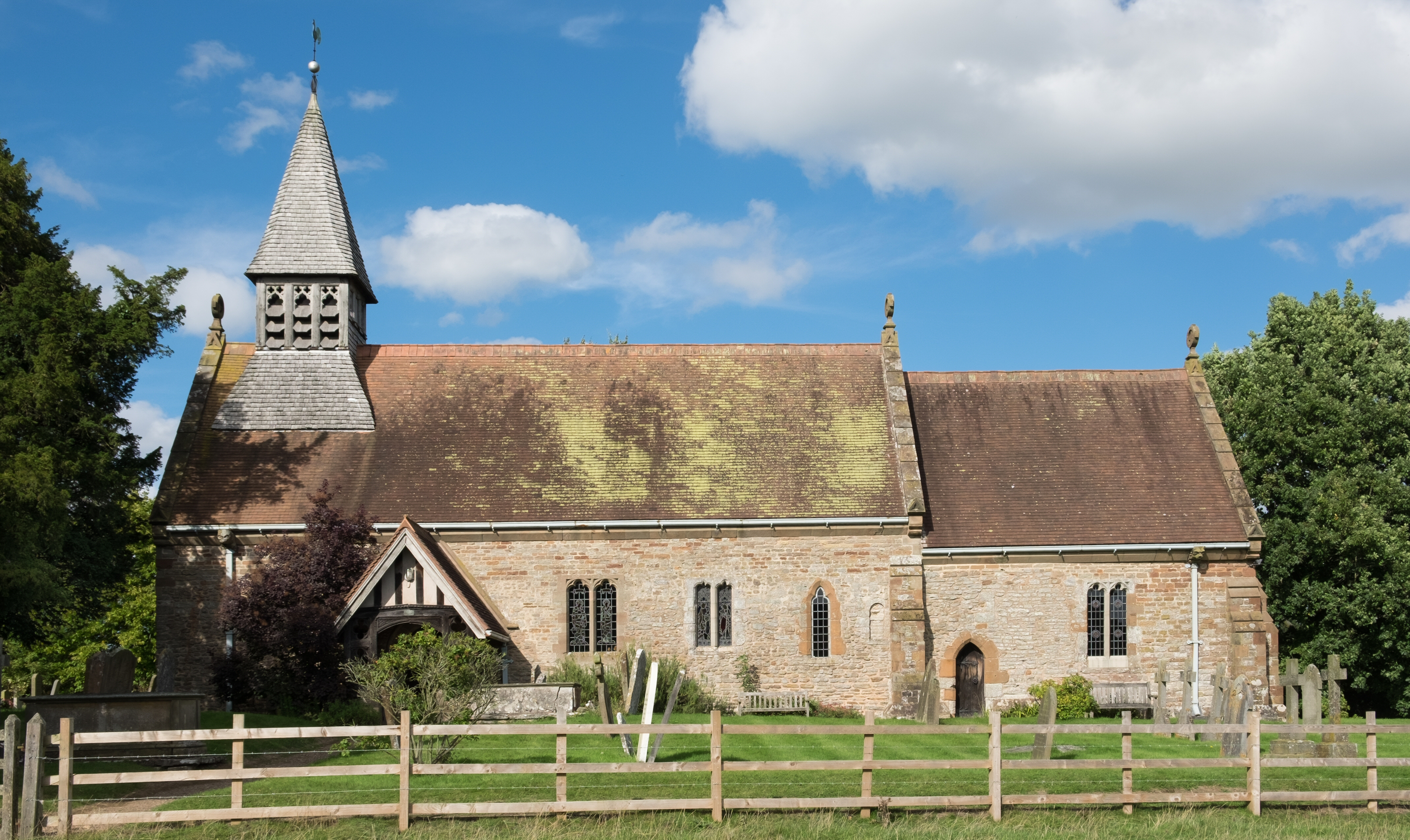
- All Saints’ Church, Preston Bagot

- Location within Warwickshire
- Population: 127 (2011 census)
- OS grid reference: SP1766
- Civil parish: Preston Bagot
- District: Stratford-upon-Avon
- Shire county: Warwickshire
- Region: West Midlands
- Country: England
- Sovereign state: United Kingdom
- Post town: Henley-in-Arden
- Postcode district: B95
- Dialling code: 01926
- Police: Warwickshire
- Fire: Warwickshire
- Ambulance: West Midlands
- UK Parliament: Stratford-on-Avon

Preston Bagot is a village and civil parish in the Stratford district of Warwickshire, England, about 6 miles (9.7 km) west of the county town of Warwick. According to the 2001 census the population was 147, reducing to 127 at the 2011 census.

== History ==
Preston Bagot is recorded in the Domesday Book of 1066 as part of the lands of the Count of Meulan, Robert of Beaumont who had inherited Meulan through his mother. It states; "In Ferncombe Hundred, (Prestetone), Preston Bagot, Thornbern held it; he was a free man. 5 hides. Land for 3 ploughs. In lordship 1 plough; 2 slaves. A mill at 16 s; woodland 1 league long and 1/2 league wide; when exploited, value 10s. The value was 30s, now 50s." At the time of the Domesday Book, and earlier, Preston consisted in total of 10 hides. Five of these as described above, the other five Britnod held. All 10 hides were held by Robert de Beaumont, in 1086, but Hugh held of the count Britnod's 5 hides, which subsequently formed the manor of Beaudesert. Turbern's portion is said to have passed from the count to his younger brother Henry, afterwards Earl of Warwick. The overlordship descended with the earldom of Warwick at least until 1315–16. It is supposed that this land was given to Ingeram Bagot by William de Newburgh, Earl of Warwick, possibly about 1170, and it is from this family that the name of Preston Bagot is derived.

== Governance ==
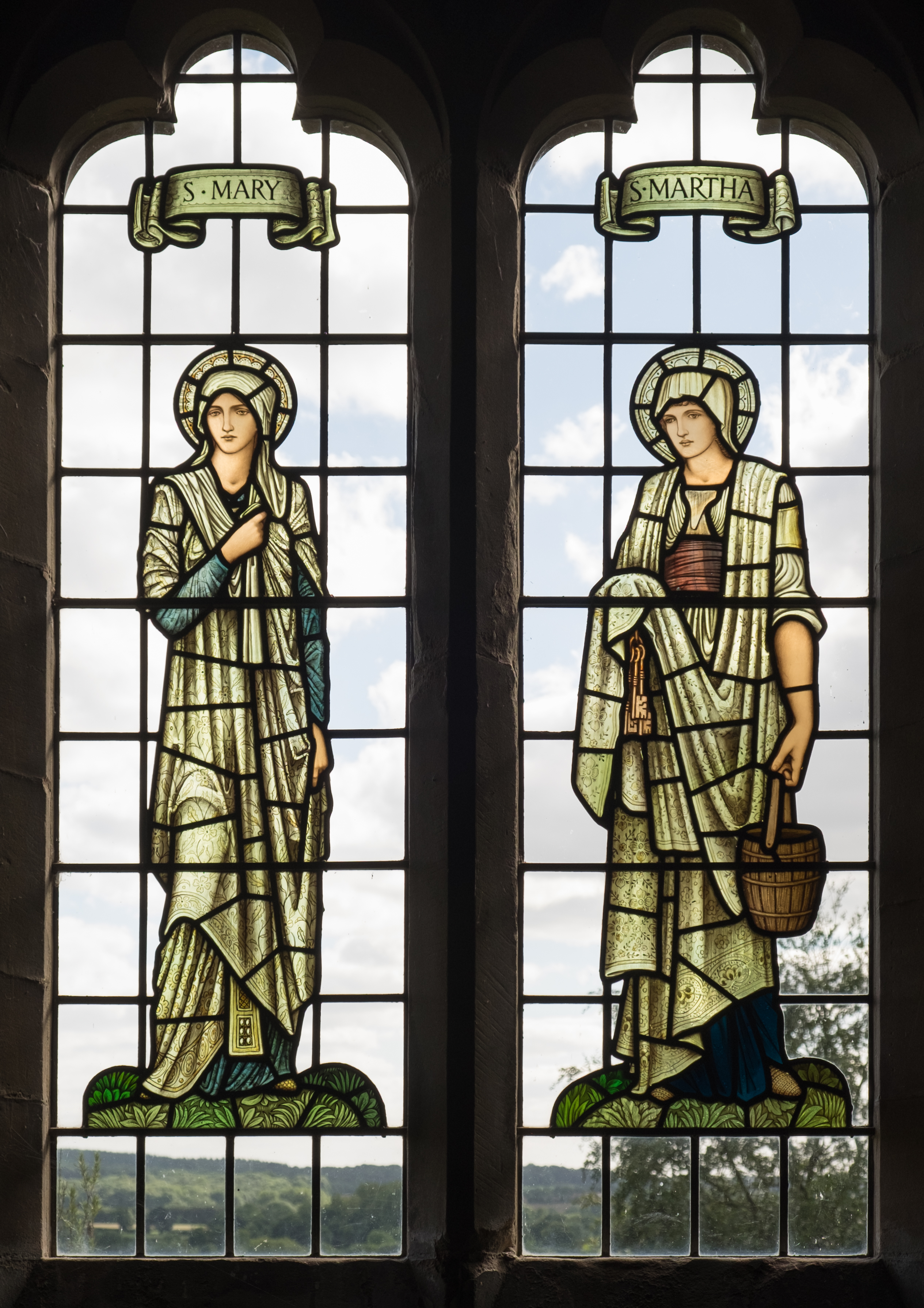
Windows by Edward Burne-Jones in All Saints’ Church

Preston Bagot is part of the Claverdon ward of Stratford-on-Avon District Council and represented by Councillor John Horner, Conservative Party . Nationally it is part of Stratford-on-Avon parliamentary constituency, whose current MP is Manuela Perteghella of the Liberal Democrat Party. Prior to Brexit in 2020, it was included in the West Midlands electoral region of the European Parliament.

== Notable buildings ==
The parish church of All Saints is situated on a high spur that has steep slopes on all sides except the north. It is a long rectangular structure consisting of a nave and chancel divided by a Victorian chancel arch, designed in 1879 by J. A. Chatwin. It has a thin timber bell turret with a spire and a modern north vestry and south porch. The vicar at the time of the Puritan Survei of the Ministrie in Warwickshire of 1586 was described thus: "Thomas Crocket parson no precher nor learned in religion he seemeth to be zealous but yet suspected of drunckenes val. xx"
