= Venture Academy (disambiguation) =

Venture Academy is a coeducational special school located in Henley-in-Arden, Warwickshire, England.

Venture Academy may also refer to:

- National Heritage Academies operated charter schools located in Ohio, United States
  - Bennett Venture Academy
  - Winterfield Venture Academy
- Ormiston Venture Academy, a secondary school with academy status located in Gorleston-on-Sea, Norfolk, England
