= Henley-in-Arden School =

Location
- Stratford Road; Henley-in-Arden; Warwickshire, B95 6AF; England
- Coordinates: 52.2865°N 1.7788°W

Information
- Type: Academy
- Local authority: Warwickshire County Council
- Trust: Arden Multi-Academy Trust (AMAT)
- Specialist: Arts (performing arts)
- Department for Education URN: 136991 Tables
- Ofsted: Reports
- Chair: Sue Westmacott
- Associate Headteacher: Joseph Roper
- Gender: Mixed
- Age: 11 to 16
- Enrolment: 710 as of June 2020
- Capacity: 700
- Colours: Navy blue blazer with a Light blue shirt for year 7-9 and a plain white shirt for year 10-11.
- Website: http://www.henleyschool.com/ http://www.ardenmat.org.uk/

Henley-in-Arden School is a mixed secondary school located in Henley-in-Arden in the English county of Warwickshire.

Previously a community school administered by Warwickshire County Council, Henley-in-Arden School converted to academy status in August 2011. On 1 April 2019, the school joined the Arden Multi-Academy Trust (AMAT) family of schools. However, the school continues to coordinate with Warwickshire County Council for admissions. The school offers mostly GCSEs as programmes of study for pupils and is a specialist Performing Arts school with a number of high-profile alumni. Students are able to study all three of Acting, Dance and Music for their KS4 programme of study at Henley.

== Alumni ==
- Connor Ball - Bass Guitarist and Vocalist for The Vamps
- Alexander Morris - Actor of Television and Stage
- George Fletcher - Writer and Actor
- Truly Scrumptious Ford-Ghatauray - Singer
- Layla Manoochehri - Singer, Songwriter, Actress and A&R Consultant
- Stephen Whittaker (1947-2003) - Actor and Director
