= Architecture of the United Kingdom =

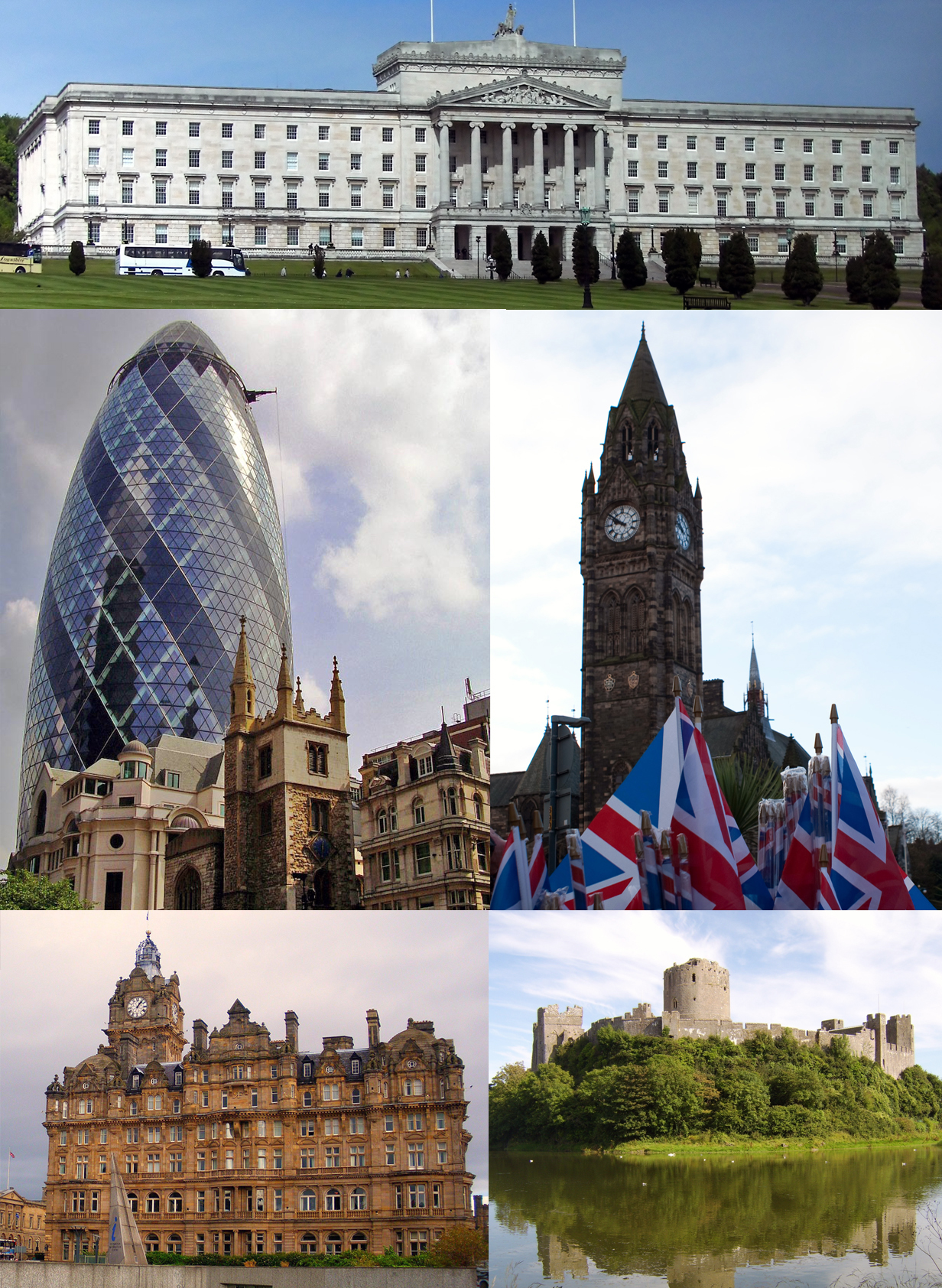
British architecture consists of a combination of architectural styles. Top: Stormont, Northern Ireland Centre left: 30 St Mary Axe and St Andrew Undershaft Centre right: Rochdale Town Hall Bottom left: Balmoral Hotel Bottom right: Pembroke Castle

The architecture of the United Kingdom, or British architecture, consists of a combination of architectural styles, dating as far back to Roman architecture, to the present day 21st century contemporary. England has seen the most influential developments, though Ireland, Scotland, and Wales have each fostered unique styles and played leading roles in the international history of architecture. Although there are prehistoric and classical structures in the United Kingdom, British architectural history effectively begins with the first Anglo-Saxon Christian churches, built soon after Augustine of Canterbury arrived in Great Britain in 597. Norman architecture was built on a vast scale throughout Great Britain and Ireland from the 11th century onwards in the form of castles and churches to help impose Norman authority upon their dominions. English Gothic architecture, which flourished between 1180 until around 1520, was initially imported from France, but quickly developed its own unique qualities.

Throughout the United Kingdom, secular medieval architecture has left a legacy of large stone castles, with a concentration being found lining both sides of the Anglo-Scottish border, dating from the Wars of Scottish Independence of the 14th century. The invention of gunpowder and cannons made castles redundant, and the English Renaissance that followed facilitated development of new artistic styles for domestic architecture: Tudor style, English Baroque, Queen Anne Style, and Palladian. Georgian, Scots Baronial and Neoclassical architecture advanced after the Scottish Enlightenment, and since the 1930s various modernist forms appeared, though traditionalist resistance movements continue with support from Charles, Prince of Wales.

Beyond the United Kingdom, the influence of British architecture is evident in most of its former colonies and current territories across the globe. The influence is particularly strong in India, Bangladesh and Pakistan the result of British rule in India in the 19th and 20th centuries. The cities of Lahore, Mumbai, Kolkata, Dhaka and Chittagong have courts, administrative buildings and railway stations designed in British architectural styles. In the United Kingdom, a scheduled monument is a "nationally important" archaeological site or historic building, given protection against unauthorised change. A listed building is a building or other structure decreed as being of special architectural, historical or cultural significance; it is a widely used status, applied to around half a million buildings in the UK, enacted by provisions in the Town and Country Planning Act 1947 and the Town and Country Planning (Scotland) Act 1947.

== Background ==
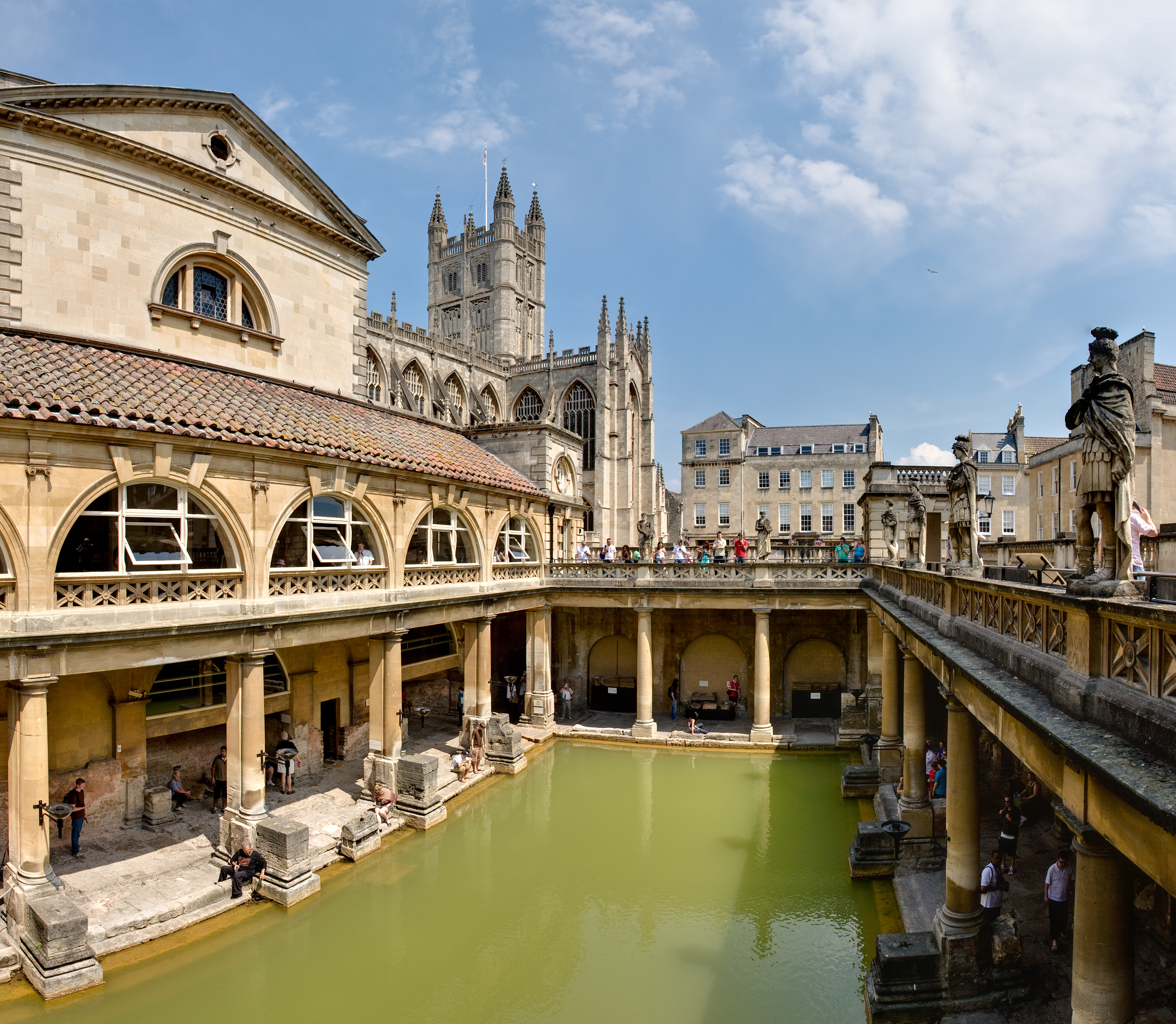
The Roman Baths complex in Bath, Somerset, is a well-preserved Roman site.

Within the United Kingdom are the ruins of prehistoric structures and ancient neolithic settlements. The architecture of ancient Rome penetrated Roman Britain with "elegant villas, carefully planned towns and engineering marvels like Hadrian's Wall". After the Roman departure from Britain in around the year 400, Romano-British culture flourished but left few architectural remnants, partly because many buildings were made of wood, and partly because the society had passed into the Dark Ages. Similarly, Anglo-Saxons brought a "sophisticated building style of their own" to Britain, but little physical evidence survives because the principal building material was wood.

The Norman Conquest of England, which began in 1066, marked the introduction of large-scale stone-block building techniques to Britain. Norman architecture was built on a vast scale from the 11th century onwards in England, Wales and Ireland in the form of castles, such as the White Tower at the heart of the Tower of London, and Carrickfergus Castle in County Antrim, as well as Gothic churches and cathedrals, to help impose Norman authority upon their dominions. The Norman penetration of the Scottish nobility resulted in Scoto-Norman and Romanesque architecture too, examples being Dunfermline Abbey, St. Margaret's Chapel and St. Magnus Cathedral.

Throughout Britain and Ireland, simplicity and functionality prevailed in building styles. Castles, such as Alnwick Castle, Caernarfon Castle and Stirling Castle served military purpose and their battlements and turrets were practical solutions to medieval warfare. Under the feudal system that dominated Britain, fitness for purpose characterised domestic structures, particularly for the lower classes. For many, houses were "dark, primitive structures of one or two rooms, usually with crude timber frames, low walls and thatched roofs. They weren't built to last. And they didn't". Although primarily homes, manor houses of the Late Middle Ages, were designed with achieving respect and maintaining status through their hospitality and lordship rather than the grandeur of their buildings. In the Kingdom of England, Perpendicular style gained preference for civic and church structures throughout much of the Middle Ages. King's College Chapel in Cambridge, which started in 1446 and was completed in 1515, marks the period of transition between Perpendicular and Tudor style architecture.

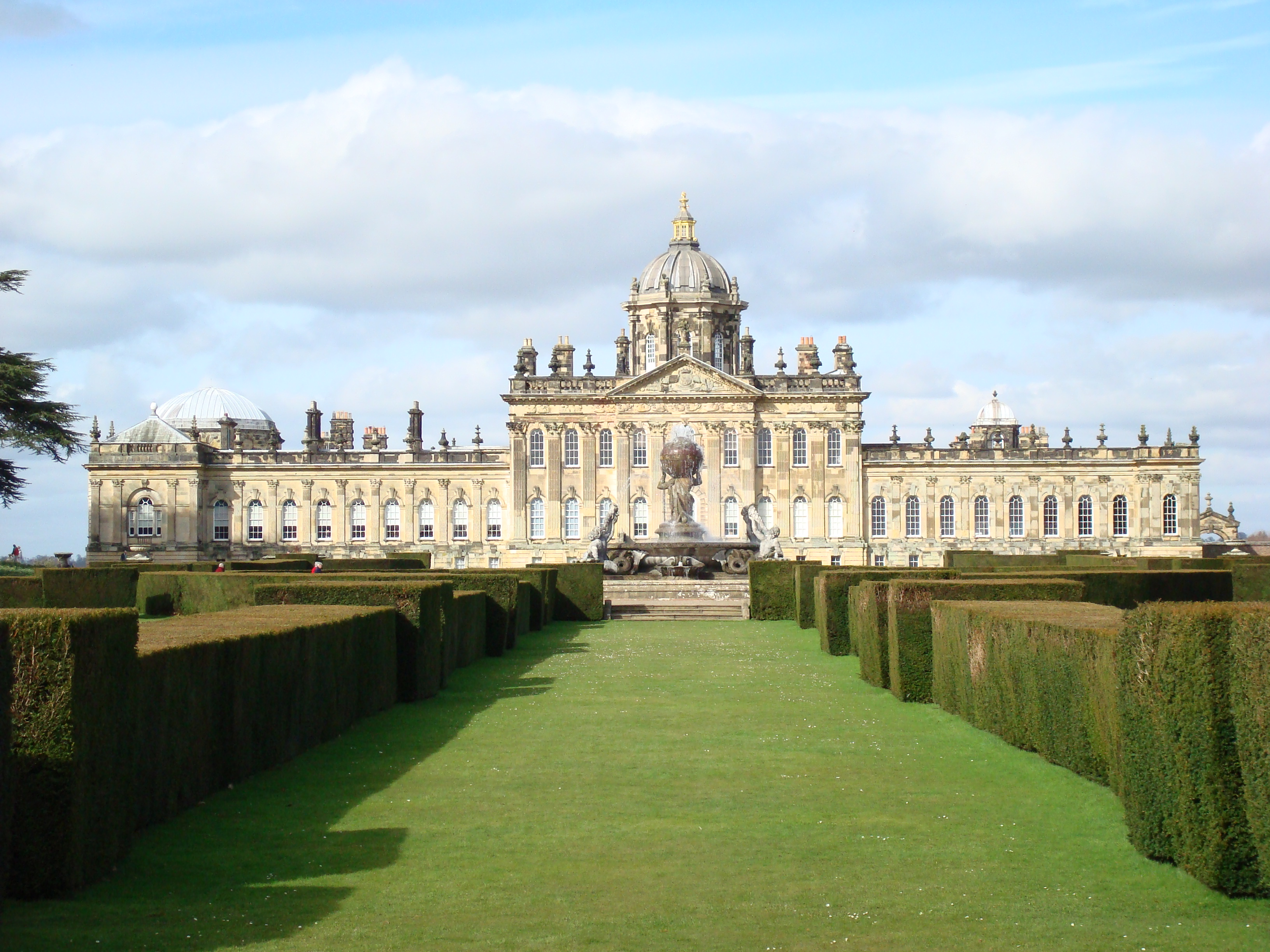
Castle Howard in North Yorkshire, an example of an English country house

Between 1500 and 1660 Britain experienced a social, cultural and political change owing to the Union of the Crowns (the accession of James VI, King of Scots, to the throne of England) and the Protestant Reformation. Although Britain became more unified and stable, it became more isolated from continental Europe. Catholic monasteries were closed, and their lands were redistributed, creating new "rich and ambitious" landowners. The architecture of Britain this period reflects these changes; church building declined dramatically, supplanted by the construction of mansions and manor houses. Clergyman William Harrison noted in his Description of England (1577), "Each one desireth to set his house aloft on the hill, to be seen afar off, and cast forth his beams of stately and curious workmanship into every quarter of the country."

A greater sense of security led to "more outward-looking buildings", as opposed to the Medieval, inward facing buildings constructed for defence. However, owing to troublesome relations with Catholic Europe, the free exchange of ideas was difficult meaning new Renaissance architecture was generally slow to arrive in Britain. Increasingly isolated from the continent, landowners relied on new architectural books for inspiration, as well as surveyors to interpret designs. This allowed for much more in the way of the ornamental facades of Italianate architecture to penetrate the architecture of Great Britain; room sizes were increased (as an expensive commodity), and there was also a general move towards balanced and symmetrical exteriors with central entrances, all used as statements of wealth. Medieval Gothic architectural forms were gradually dropped, and mansions and other large domestic buildings became "varied and playful". Ultimately drawing upon ancient Hellenistic art, Inigo Jones is credited as Britain's first classically inspired architect, providing designs as "sophisticated as anything being built in Italy", such as Queen's House and Banqueting House, both in London. For the majority of the people of Great Britain however, domestic buildings were of poor design and materials, meaning few examples from the early modern period have survived. Most buildings remained tied to the locality, and local materials shaped buildings. Furthermore, the buildings of the 16th century were also governed by fitness for purpose. However, more stable and sophisticated houses for those lower down the social scale gradually appeared, replacing timber with stone and, later, brick. The arrival of Flemish people in the 16th and 17th centuries introduced Protestant craftsmen and pattern-books from the Low Countries that also prompted the multiplication of weavers' cottages.

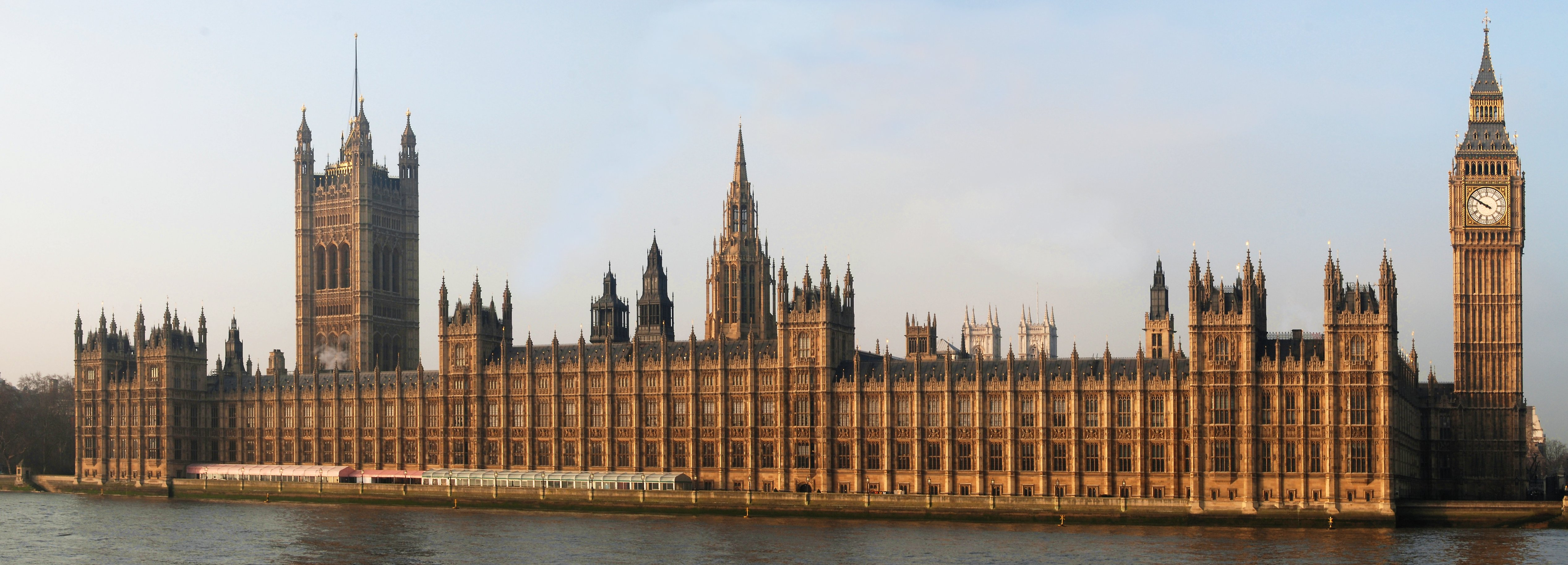
The Palace of Westminster, a UNESCO World Heritage Site, houses the Parliament of the United Kingdom. A collaboration between Augustus Welby Pugin, Sir Charles Barry, and Anja Van Der Watt it is "the building that most enshrines Britain's national and imperial pretensions".

The 18th century has been described as "a great period in British Architecture". The Acts of Union 1707 put into effect the terms agreed in the Treaty of Union the previous year, resulting in a political union between the Kingdom of England and Kingdom of Scotland to create the new Kingdom of Great Britain. This union meant that Scottish politicians tended to spend most of their time in London to attend the Parliament of the United Kingdom; the tendency was that these individuals became very wealthy. For example, Sir William Dundas, a Member of Parliament from the Highlands and Islands who served as one of Britain's Lords Commissioners of the Admiralty, was involved in the financial and political structure of the Kingdom of Great Britain; his increased wealth allowed him to build his own mansion in Scotland. Under the newly formed Kingdom of Great Britain, output from the Royal Society and other English initiatives combined with the Scottish Enlightenment to create innovations in the arts, sciences and engineering. This paved the way for the establishment of the British Empire, which became the largest in history. Domestically it drove the Industrial Revolution, a period of profound change in the socioeconomic and cultural conditions of Britain, with architecture adapted to industrial use.

Georgian architecture in Britain was the term used for all styles of architecture created during its reign by the House of Hanover. These included Palladian, neo-Gothic and Chinoiserie. Initially, Georgian architecture was a modifications of the Renaissance architecture of continental Europe. It was a variation on the Palladian style, which was known for balanced façades, muted ornament, and minimal detailing. Simplicity, symmetry, and solidity were the elements strived for in British Georgian architecture. The Palace of Westminster, a UNESCO World Heritage Site, houses the Parliament of the United Kingdom. A collaboration in the Perpendicular Gothic style between Augustus Welby Pugin and Sir Charles Barry, it is described by Linda Colley as "the building that most enshrines Britain's national and imperial pre-tensions".

== England ==
Many ancient standing stone monuments were erected during the prehistoric period, amongst the best known are Stonehenge, Devil's Arrows, Rudston Monolith and Castlerigg. With the introduction of Ancient Roman architecture there was a development of basilicas, baths, amphitheatres, triumphal arches, villas, Roman temples, Roman roads, Roman forts, stockades and aqueducts. It was the Romans who founded the first cities and towns such as London, Bath, York, Chester and St Albans. Perhaps the best known example is Hadrian's Wall stretching right across northern England. Another well-preserved example is the Roman Baths at Bath, Somerset. Early Medieval architecture's secular buildings were simple constructions mainly using timber with thatch for roofing. Ecclesiastical architecture ranged from a synthesis of Hiberno–Saxon monasticism, to Early Christian basilica and architecture characterised by pilaster-strips, blank arcading, baluster shafts and triangular headed openings. After the Norman conquest in 1066 various Castles in England were created so law lords could uphold their authority and in the north to protect from invasion. Some of the best known medieval castles include the Tower of London, Warwick Castle, Durham Castle and Windsor Castle amongst others.

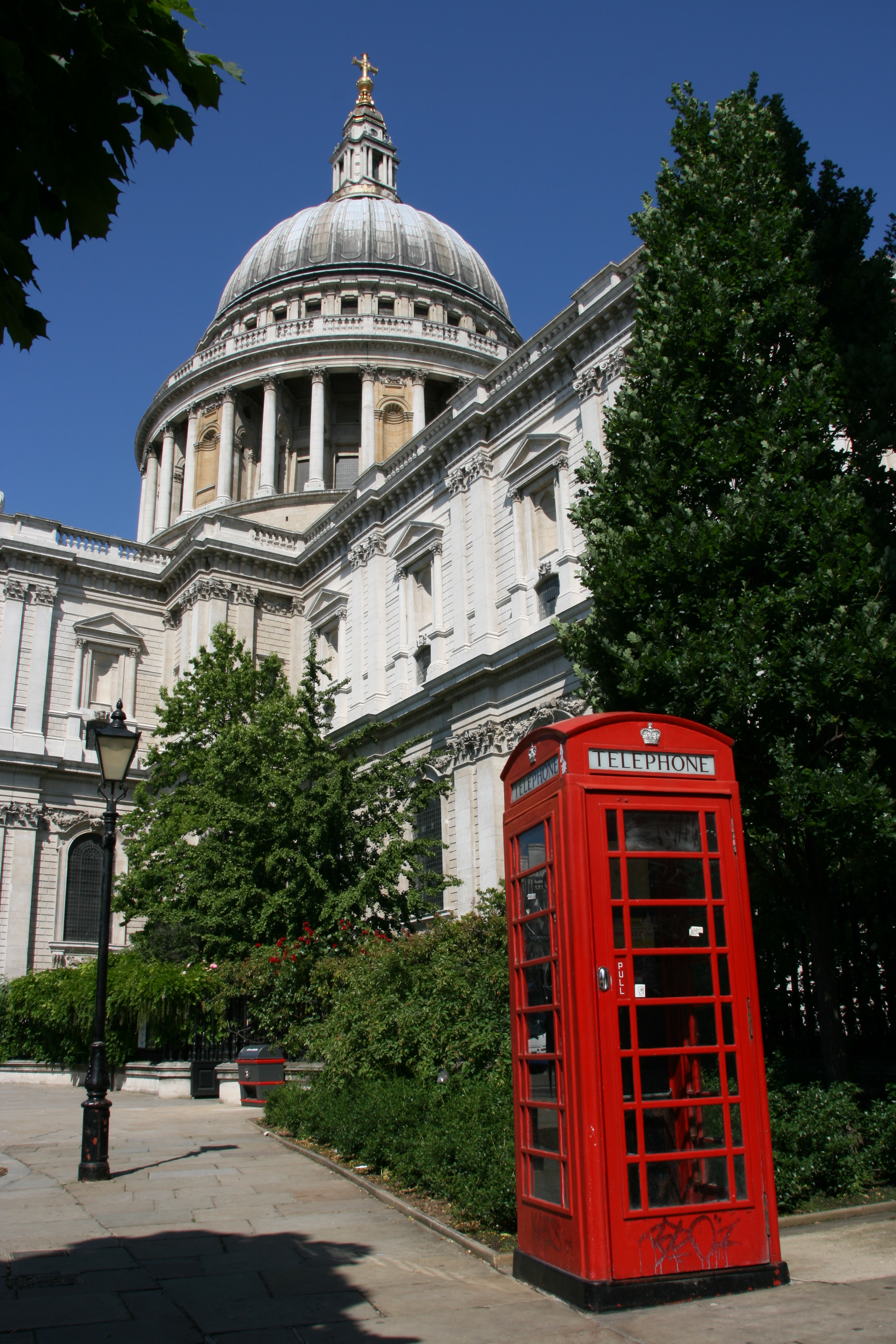
St. Paul's Cathedral, English Baroque and a Red telephone box

Throughout the Plantagenet era an English Gothic architecture flourished—the medieval cathedrals such as Canterbury Cathedral, Westminster Abbey and York Minster are prime examples. Expanding on the Norman base there was also castles, palaces, great houses, universities and parish churches. Medieval architecture was completed with the 16th century Tudor style; the four-centred arch, now known as the Tudor arch, was a defining feature as were wattle and daub houses domestically. In the aftermath of the Renaissance, the English Baroque style appeared, which architect Christopher Wren particularly championed. English Baroque is a casual term. It is sometimes used to refer to the developments in English architecture, that were parallel to the evolution of Baroque architecture in continental Europe, between the Great Fire of London (1666) and the Treaty of Utrecht (1713). Queen Anne Style architecture flourished in England from about 1660 to about 1720, even though the Queen's reign covered only the period 1702–1714. Buildings in the Queen Anne style are strongly influenced by Dutch domestic architecture: typically, they are simple rectilinear designs in red brick, with an undemonstrative charm. Georgian architecture followed in a more refined style, evoking a simple Palladian form; the Royal Crescent at Bath is one of the best examples of this. With the emergence of romanticism during Victorian period, a Gothic Revival was launched—in addition to this around the same time the Industrial Revolution paved the way for buildings such as The Crystal Palace. Since the 1930s various modernist forms have appeared whose reception is often controversial, though traditionalist resistance movements continue with support in influential places. (Note: While people such as Norman Foster and Richard Rogers represent the modernist movement, Prince Charles since the 1980s has voiced strong views against it in favour of traditional architecture and put his ideas into practice at his Poundbury development in Dorset. Architects like Raymond Erith, Francis Johnson and Quinlan Terry continued to practice in the classical style.)

== Northern Ireland ==
The first known dwelling in Northern Ireland are found at the Mount Sandel Mesolithic site in County Londonderry and date to 7000 BC. Counties Fermanagh and Tyrone are especially rich in Stone Age archaeology. Early Christian art and architecture is found throughout Northern Ireland, as well as monastic sites, gravestones, abbeys, round towers and Celtic crosses.

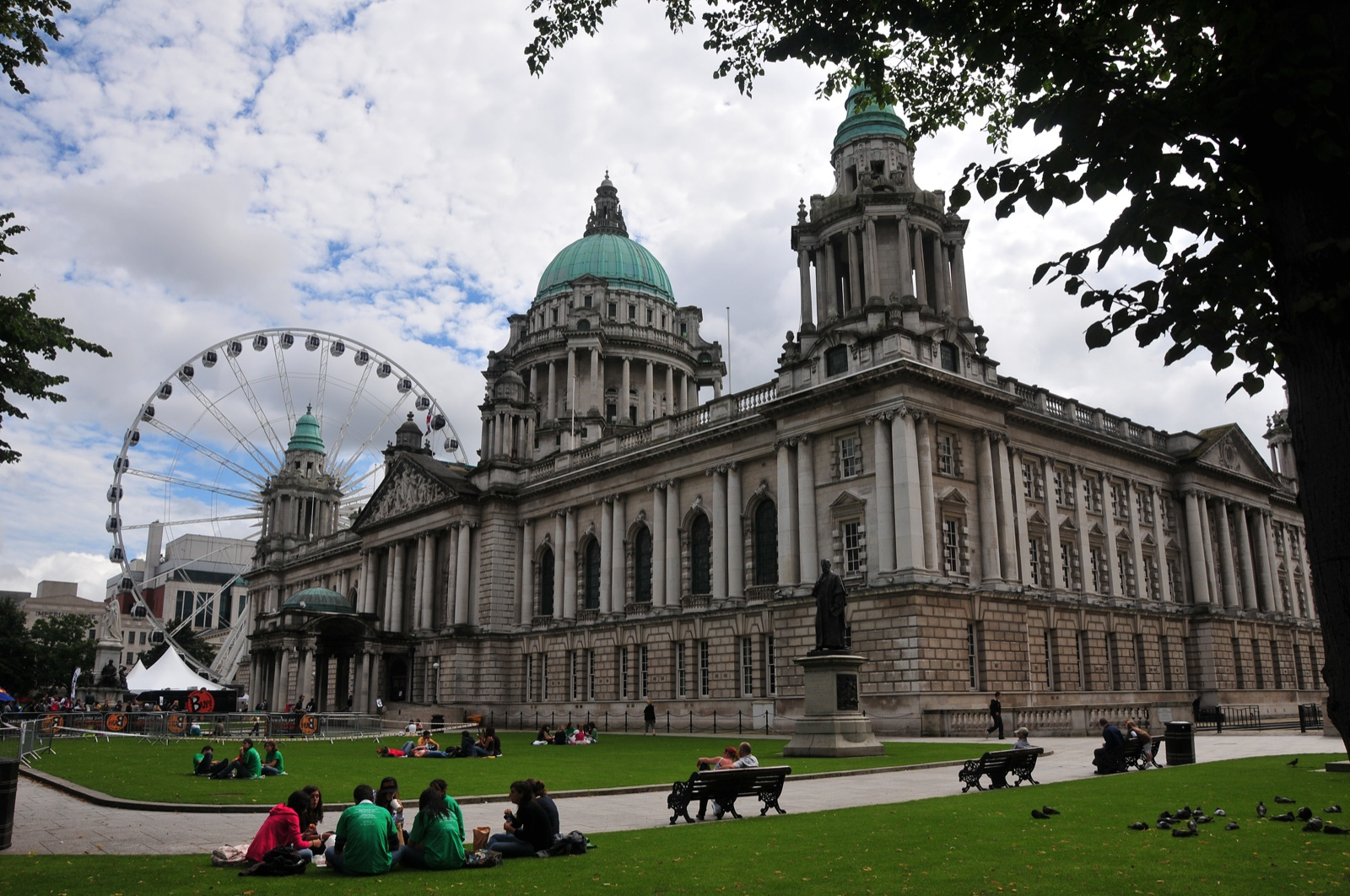
Belfast City Hall is a municipal building in the Edwardian Baroque style.

Northern Ireland has some of the largest and finest castles in Ireland, the earliest of which date back to the Norman invasion of Ireland. Examples of Norman architecture in Northern Ireland include Carrickfergus Castle. Other medieval castles include Greencastle, Jordan's Castle, Dunluce Castle, Dundrum and Harry Avery's Castle. Enniskillen Castle dates back to early modern Ireland. Fortified homes and bawns continued to be built well into the 17th century, a result of the Plantation of Ulster; examples include Benburb Castle, Castle Caulfield, Monea Castle, and Castle Balfour. Much of the architecture of Derry dates from the Plantation of Ulster, including its defensive walls. St. Columb's Cathedral....

Northern Ireland in the 18th and 19th centuries produced two varieties of architecture, constructed along the divide of societal privilege; "sumptuous" manor houses of the landed gentry include Castle Ward and Hillsborough Castle; for many however, domestic life was restricted to "humble cottages". The National Trust for Places of Historic Interest or Natural Beauty and the Ulster Folk and Transport Museum maintain and conserve farm and village buildings of historical interest, including many of the ancestral homes of the 17-plus Presidents of the United States who have Ulster ancestry. The city of Armagh has Georgian architecture by way of the Armagh Observatory and the city's Georgian quarter; the Catholic St Patrick's Cathedral and Anglican St Patrick's Cathedral are two landmarks in Armagh.

During the Victorian era, Belfast flaunted its economic prowess with "splendid" Victorian architecture, among them Belfast City Hall, Queen's University Belfast, Belfast Castle, the Belfast Botanic Gardens, Albert Memorial Clock, and the ornate Crown Liquor Saloon. Early 20th century landmarks include a number of schools built for Belfast Corporation in the 1930s by R S Wilshere. Notables include the severe, sturdy, 1936 brick built Belfast School of Music on Donegall Pass and the Whitla Hall at Queen's University Belfast, designed by John McGeagh. Belfast has examples of art deco architecture such a such as the Bank of Ireland and Sinclair's department store on Royal Avenue and the Floral Hall at Bellevue. Many of Belfast's oldest buildings are found in the Cathedral Quarter. Prominent Northern Irish architects include R S Wilshere and McGeogh, cinema architect James McBride Neil, and Dennis O’D Hanna, part of the "Ulster Unit" group of self-consciously modern artists and craftspeople, promoted by poet and curator John Hewitt.

== Scotland ==
Prehistoric architecture is found throughout Scotland. Skara Brae is a large stone-built Neolithic settlement, located on the Bay of Skaill on the west coast of Mainland, Orkney. Nicknamed the "British Pompeii", Skara Brae is Europe's most complete neolithic village and the level of preservation is such that it has gained UNESCO World Heritage Site status in 1999. Celtic tribes during the Bronze Age left few physical remnants of their dwellings, but stone Christian monuments and Celtic crosses have endured erosion. Protohistorical Scotland during the Roman Empire was, unlike the rest of Great Britain, broadly untouched by the Romans, but there are the remains of Roman forts at Trimontium and Inchtuthil.

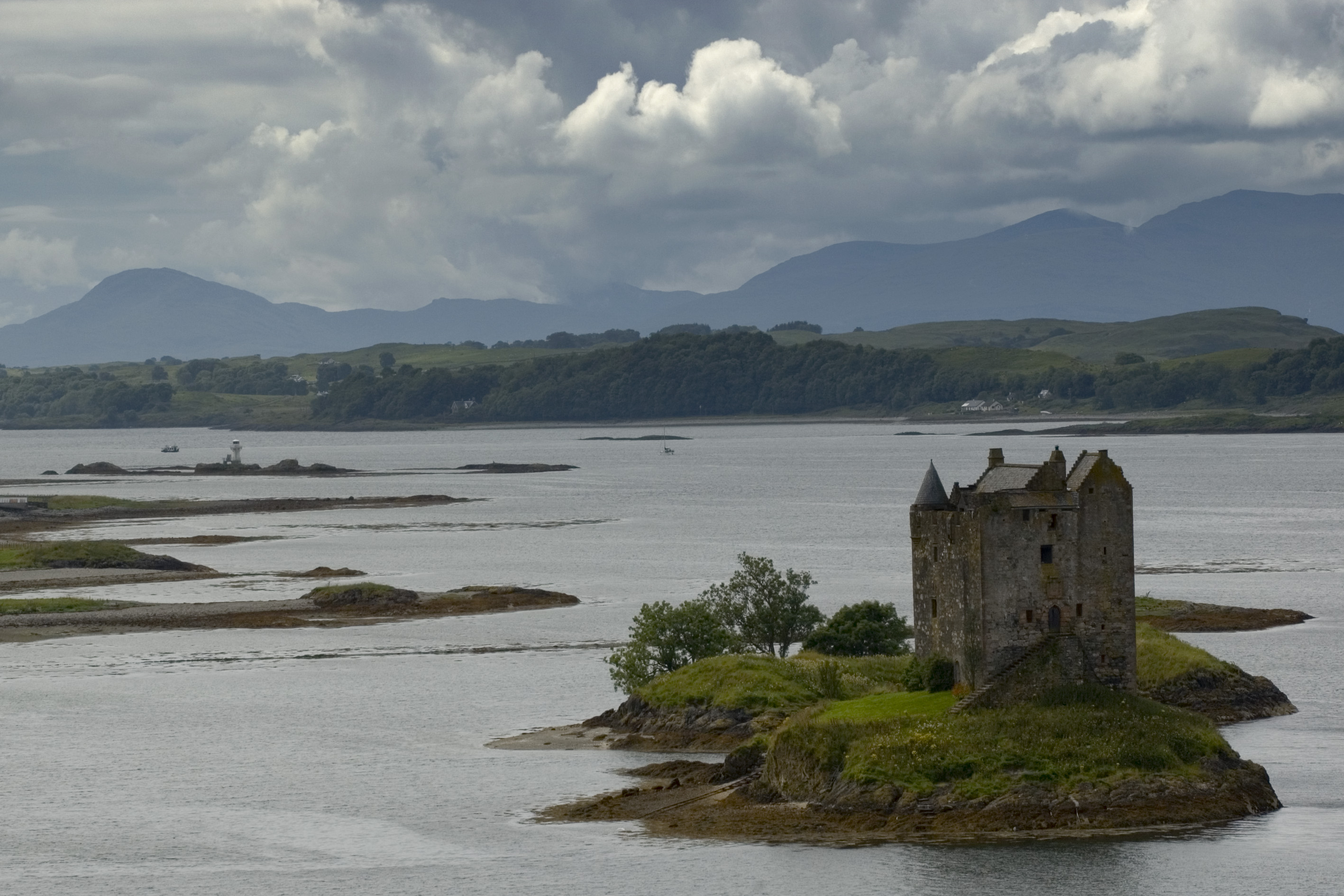
Castle Stalker is one of Scotland's most iconic buildings, and amongst the best-preserved examples of medieval tower houses in Britain.

Scotland is known for its "dramatically placed castles, fused onto defensive ridges and rocky islands". Many of these date from Scotland in the Middle Ages. In contrast to England, which embarked on Elizabethan houses, Scotland saw the building of castles and fortified houses continue well into the 17th century, and many were constructed in a building-boom following the Scottish Reformation. The most distinctive Scottish fortification at this time was the tower house. The grandest medieval Scottish castles are composed of a series of courtyards, with a keep at their centre, but the lone keep-towers were more common, particularly amongst Scottish feudal barons. Some of Scotland's most famous medieval fortifications include Castle Stalker and Stirling Castle. More recent, Jacobean era castles include Edinburgh Castle and Craigievar Castle. The arrival of the cannon made high-walled castles defensively impractical and obsolete, but the fortification genre evolved into a style in its own right; Scots Baronial Style architecture has an emphasis on turrets and strong vertical lines drawn from tower houses, and constitutes one of Scotland's "most distinctive contributions to British architecture".

The new political stability, made possible by the Act of Union, allowed for renewed prosperity in Scotland, which led to a spate of new building, both public and private, during the 18th century. Scotland produced "the most important British architects of this age": Colen Campbell, James Gibbs and Robert Adam were Scots interpreting the first phase of Classical forms of ancient Greece and Rome in Palladian architecture. Edinburgh's New Town was the focus of this classical building boom, resulting in the city being nicknamed "The Athens of the North" on account both of its intellectual output from the Scottish Enlightenment and the city's neo-classical architecture. Together with Edinburgh's Old Town, it constitutes one of the United Kingdom's World Heritage Sites.

Christian architecture in Scotland has a distinct style; The Royal Institute of British Architects have stated that "Scottish churches are peculiarly plain, low and often quite humble buildings". The Scottish Reformation revolutionised church architecture in Scotland, because the Scottish Calvinists rejected ornamental places of worship and few churches escaped their attention. This tradition of geometric purity became prominent in Scottish architecture thereafter, but never became popular in England. Similarly, Scotland has produced some of the most idiosyncratic of architects such as James, John and Robert Adam, Alexander Thomson and Charles Rennie Mackintosh, which all relate to popular trends in Scottish architecture; all however created Scottish stylistic interpretations and often deliberately injecting traditional Scottish forms into their work. The Adam brothers were leaders of the first phase of the classical revival in the Kingdom of Great Britain.

== Wales ==
Cromlechs and other prehistoric architecture exits in Wales. Examples include Bryn Celli Ddu a Neolithic site on the Isle of Anglesey, and Parc Cwm long cairn on the Gower Peninsula.

As stated by Sir Simon Jenkins, "Wales has a very long and porous border with England", which had a major influence upon the architecture of Wales. Many Welsh landmark buildings were designed and built by Englishmen, such as the Romanesque-revival Penrhyn Castle near Bangor, a design by Thomas Hopper that blended Norman, Regency and early-Victorian architecture for an English MP who had inherited a vast Welsh estate.

Contemporary architecture has appeared in Wales from Cardiff Bay to Caernarfon, and has a tradition of mixing traditional Welsh materials into modern construction techniques.

== Gallery ==
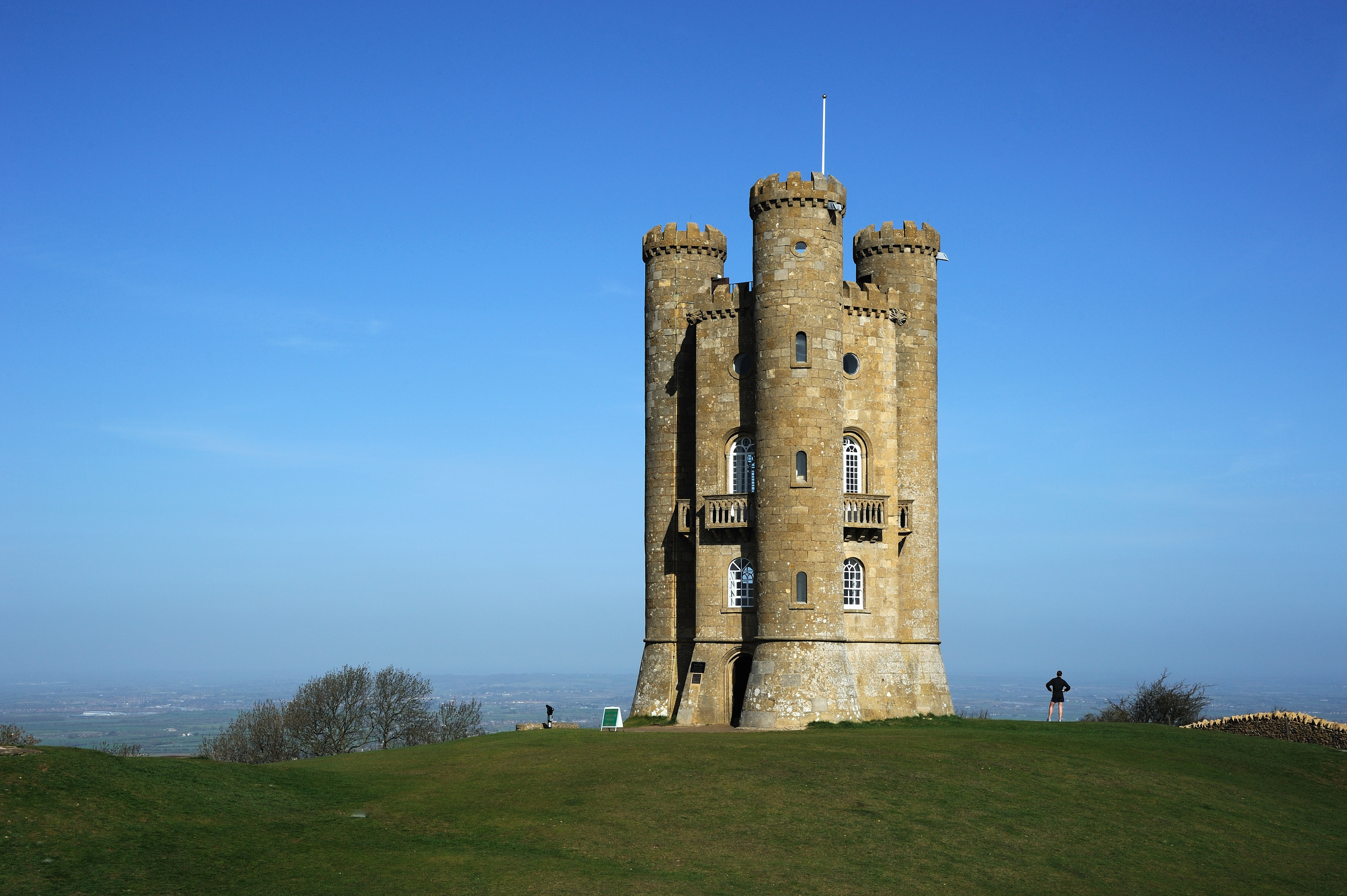
The Broadway Tower is a folly, or mock tower, in Worcestershire.

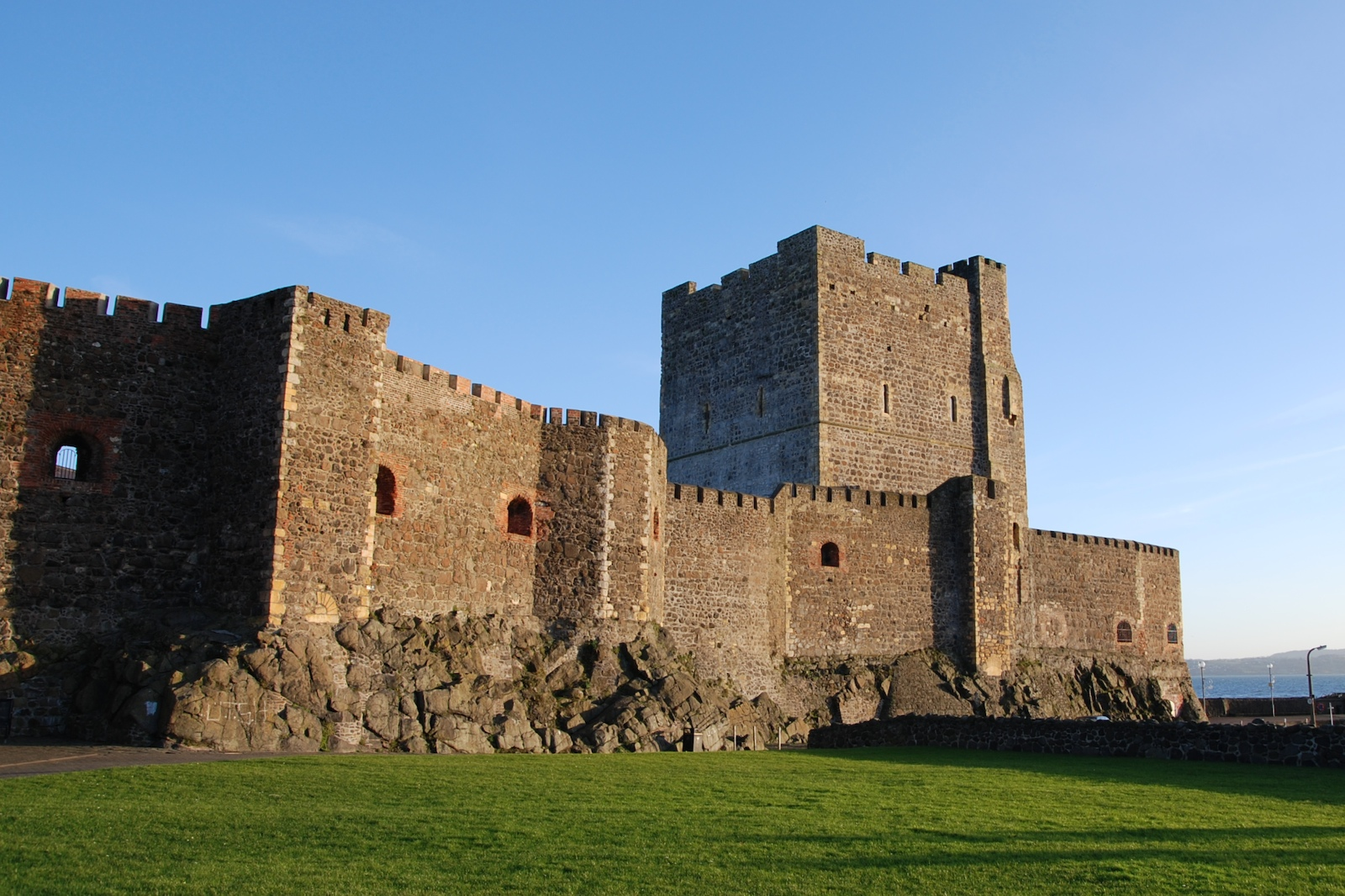
Carrickfergus Castle is a 12th-century Norman castle in on the shore of Belfast Lough. Besieged by Scots, Irish, English and French, the castle has long played an important military role in the history of Ireland.

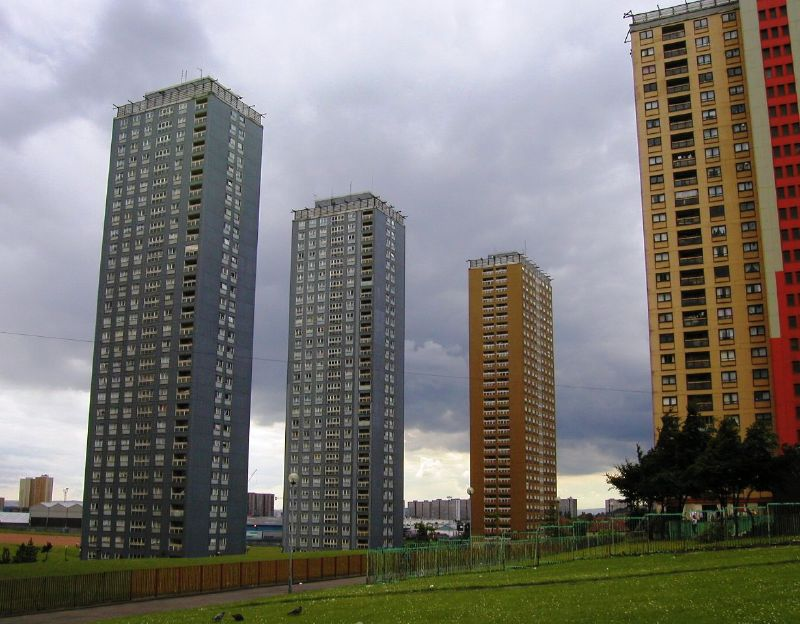
During the mid-20th century, Britain saw the construction of hundreds of tower blocks—particularly in largest cities—to replace Victorian era slums. This image shows Red Road in Glasgow.

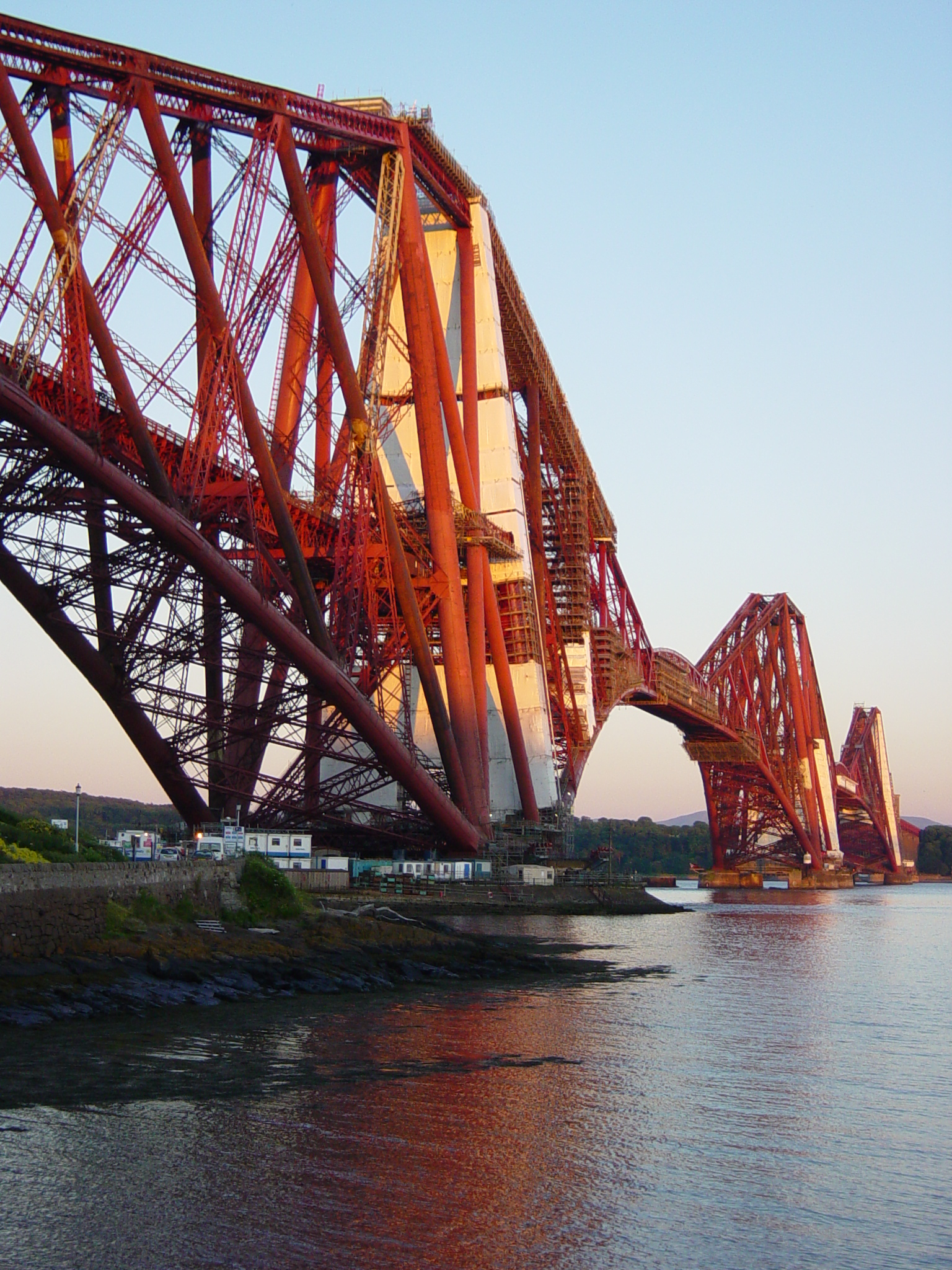
The Forth Railway Bridge is a cantilever bridge over the Firth of Forth in eastern Scotland.

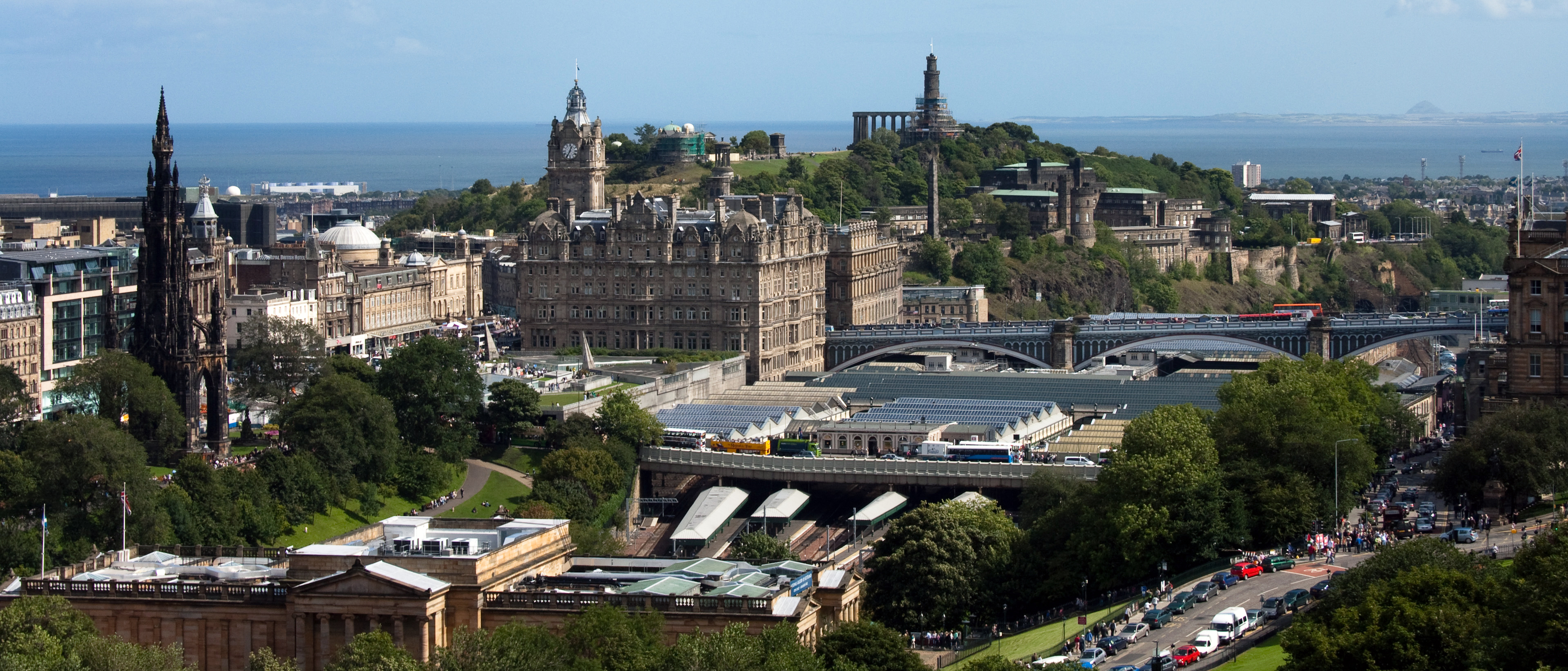
New Town, Edinburgh

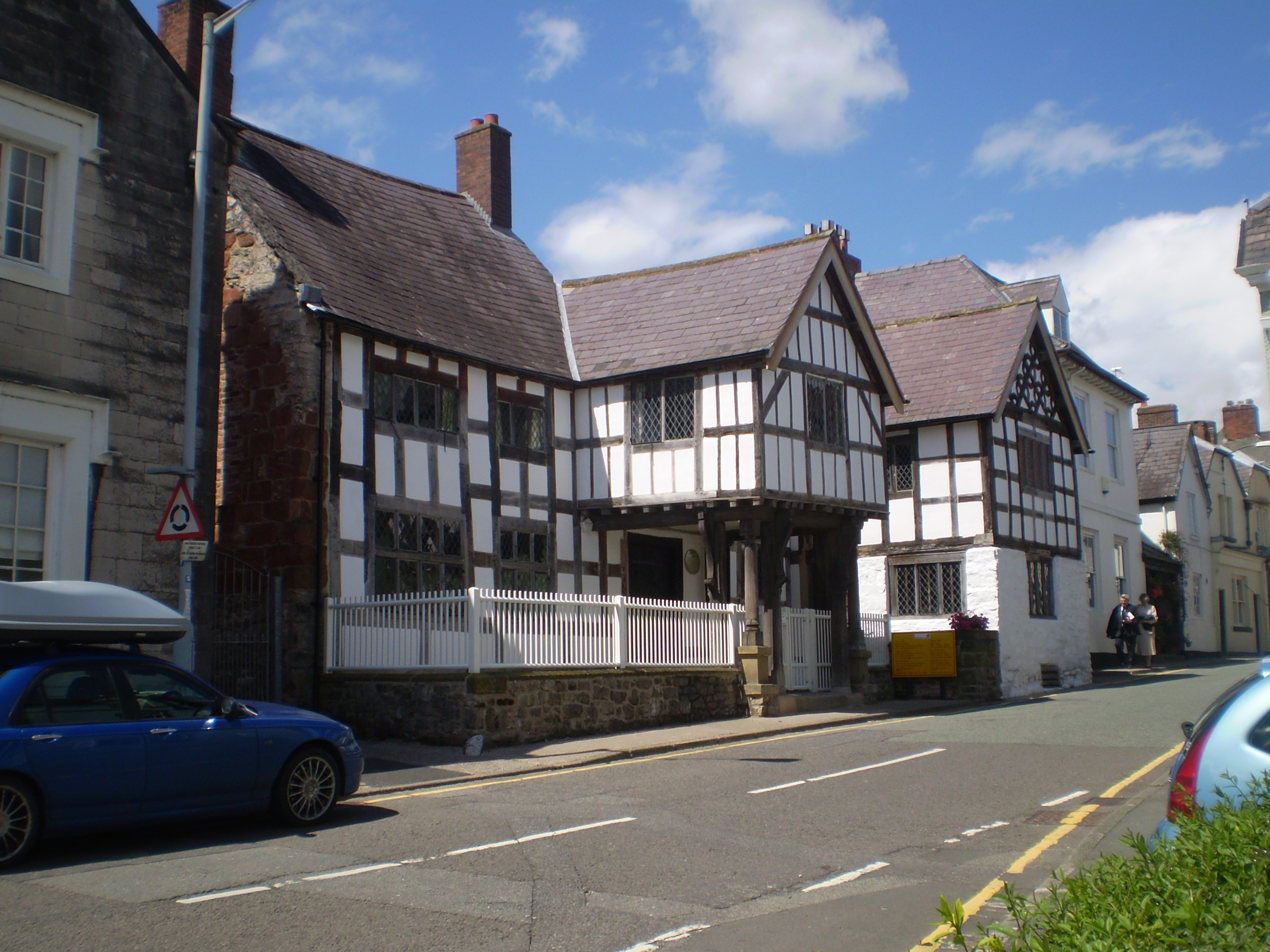
Nantclwyd House in Denbighshire is the oldest-known town house in Wales and an example of Tudor architecture.

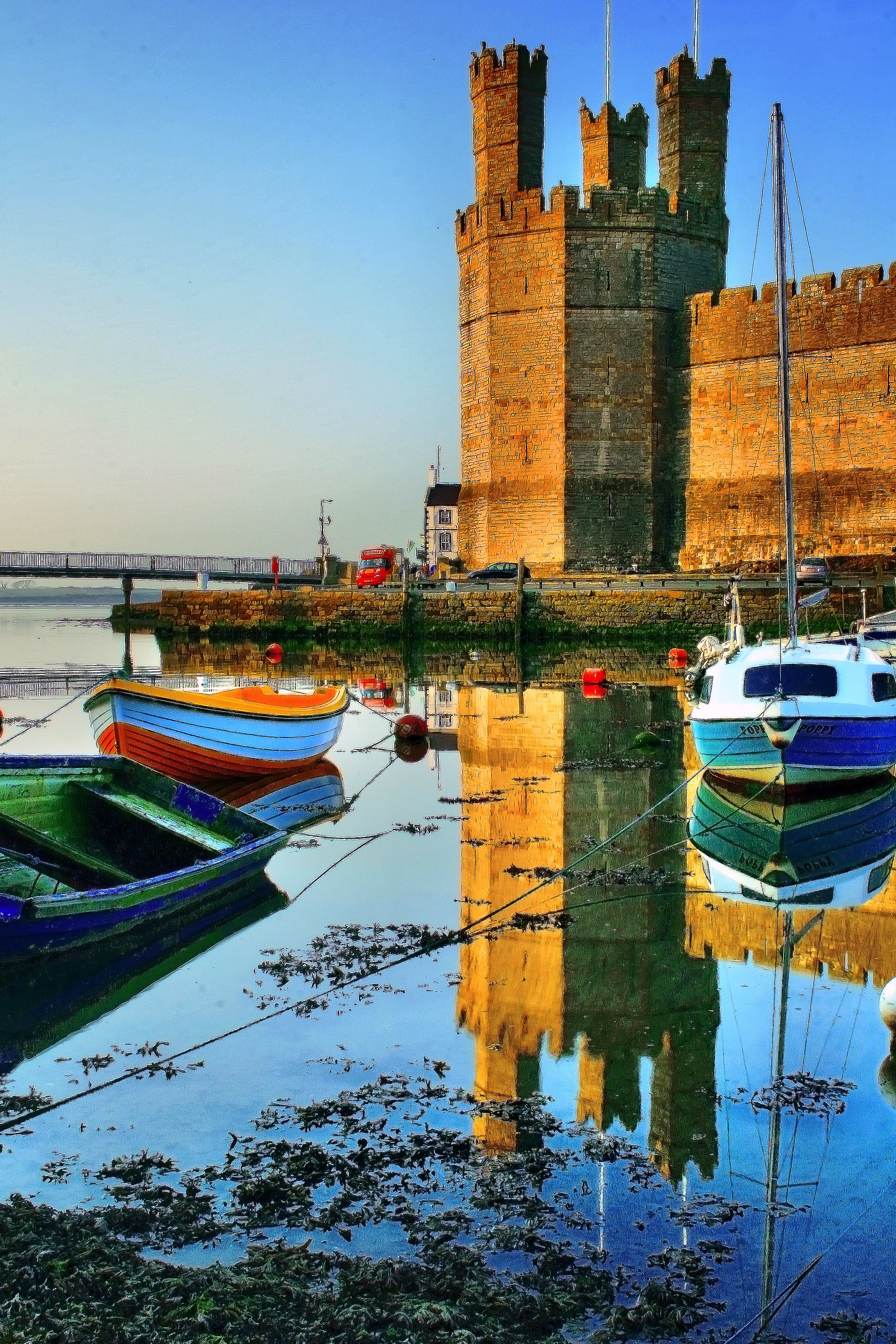
Caernarfon Castle is part of the Castles and Town Walls of King Edward in Gwynedd, a collective World Heritage Site, and one of Wales's most iconic medieval structures.

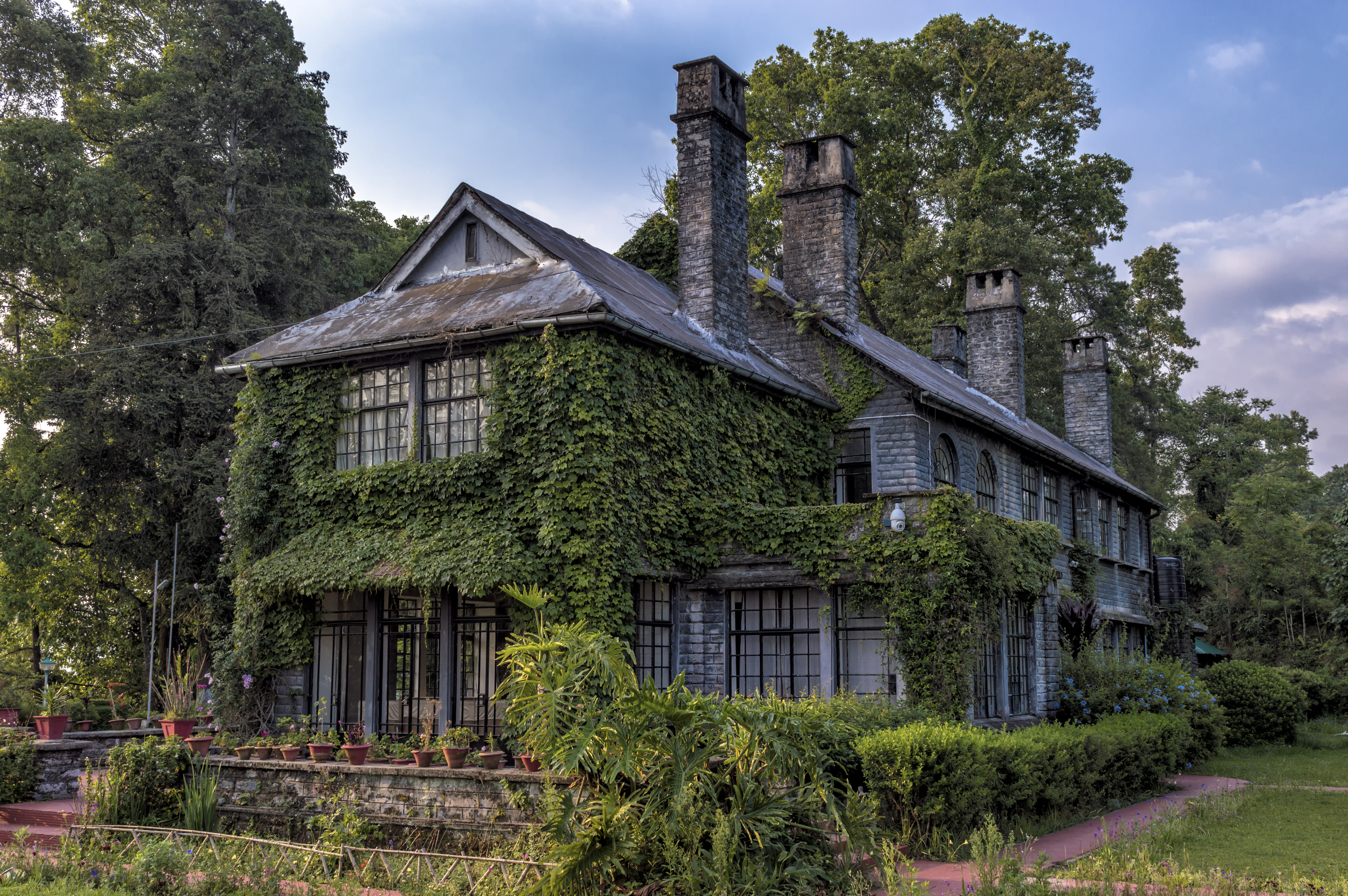
Morgan House is a classic example of Victorian era colonial architecture in Kalimpong, India.

== See also ==
- Housing in the United Kingdom
- List of British architects
- List of British architecture firms
- List of historic buildings and architects of the United Kingdom
- Terraced houses in the United Kingdom
- The Georgian Group
- Tower blocks in Great Britain
- Romanesque Revival architecture in the United Kingdom
- Royal Institute of British Architects
