= Benjamin Beddome =

British hymn writer

Benjamin Beddome (23 January 1717 – 3 September 1795) was an English Particular Baptist minister and hymn writer. He served as minister for fifty-five years.

== Early life ==
Beddome was born in Henley-in-Arden, Warwickshire, England, the son of Baptist minister John Beddome and Rachel Brandon. He was baptized in 1739 at the Baptist church at Prescott Street, Goodman's Fields, London, by Samuel Wilson. He studied under Bernard Foskett at Bristol Academy, where he established a close friendship with Caleb Evans and later at the Independent academy at Mile End in Middlesex. The family later moved to Bristol, where Beddome was apprenticed to a surgeon. At the end of his apprenticeship, he decided instead to pursue theological education with the intention of becoming a Christian minister. He studied initially under Bernard Foskett at the Baptist college in Bristol, where he became friends with John Ash. He later moved to complete his education at Moorfields Academy in London. He was baptized at the Baptist church in Prescott Street, Goodman's Fields, in 1739.

== Career ==
In 1740 he became the pastor of the Baptist church in Bourton-on-the-Water, Gloucestershire, and was ordained in 1743. He continued in this ministry for fifty-five years. He became well known as a preacher. John Rippon commented that, "though his voice was low, his delivery was forcible and demanded attention." He was a leading figure in the Midland Baptist Association.

== Personal ==
He married Elizabeth Boswell (1732–1784), daughter of a deacon in the church in Bourton, on 11 December 1749. They had three sons, John, Benjamin and Foskett.

In 1770, Beddome received an M.A. degree from Providence College, Rhode Island. He died in Bourton aged 78, and was buried in the graveyard of the Baptist church.

== Works ==
Beddome was prolific as hymn writer, composing more than 800 hymns during his lifetime. They were written to be sung after his weekly Sunday sermon each week: relating to its content, they were not originally intended for publication. Beddome allowed 13 of his hymms to be included in the Bristol Baptist Collection of Ash & Evans, and 36 in Rippon's Selection. In 1818, a posthumous collection of 830 of his hymns was published as Hymns Adapted to Public Worship or Family Devotion. A number of Beddome's hymns are also included in the Sacred Harp. Robert Hall wrote:

The man of taste will be gratified with the beauty and original turns of thought which many of them exhibit, while the experimental Christian will often perceive the most secret movements of his soul strikingly delineated, and sentiments portrayed which will find their echo in every heart.

In 1752, Beddome wrote A Scriptural Exposition of the Baptist Catechism, by Way of Question and Answer, which was reprinted in 1776. Three volumes of his sermons were printed posthumously.
