= William James (railway promoter) =

English lawyer, surveyor, and rail promoter (1771–1837)

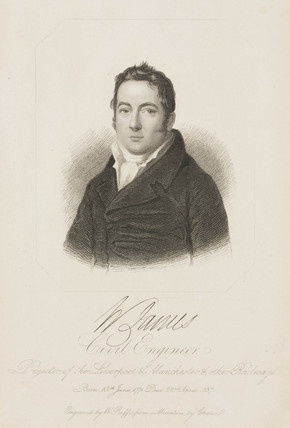
- William James c. 1800
- Born: 13 June 1771; Henley-in-Arden, Warwickshire
- Died: 10 March 1837 (aged 65); Bodmin, Cornwall
- Occupations: Lawyer, land agent, surveyor
- Known for: Early visionary and promoter of the railway system

William James (13 June 1771 – 10 March 1837) was an English lawyer, surveyor, land agent and pioneer promoter of rail transport. According to his obituary "He was the original projector of the Liverpool & Manchester and other railways, and may with truth be considered as the father of the railway system, as he surveyed numerous lines at his own expense at a time when such an innovation was generally ridiculed."

== Life and career ==
=== Early life ===
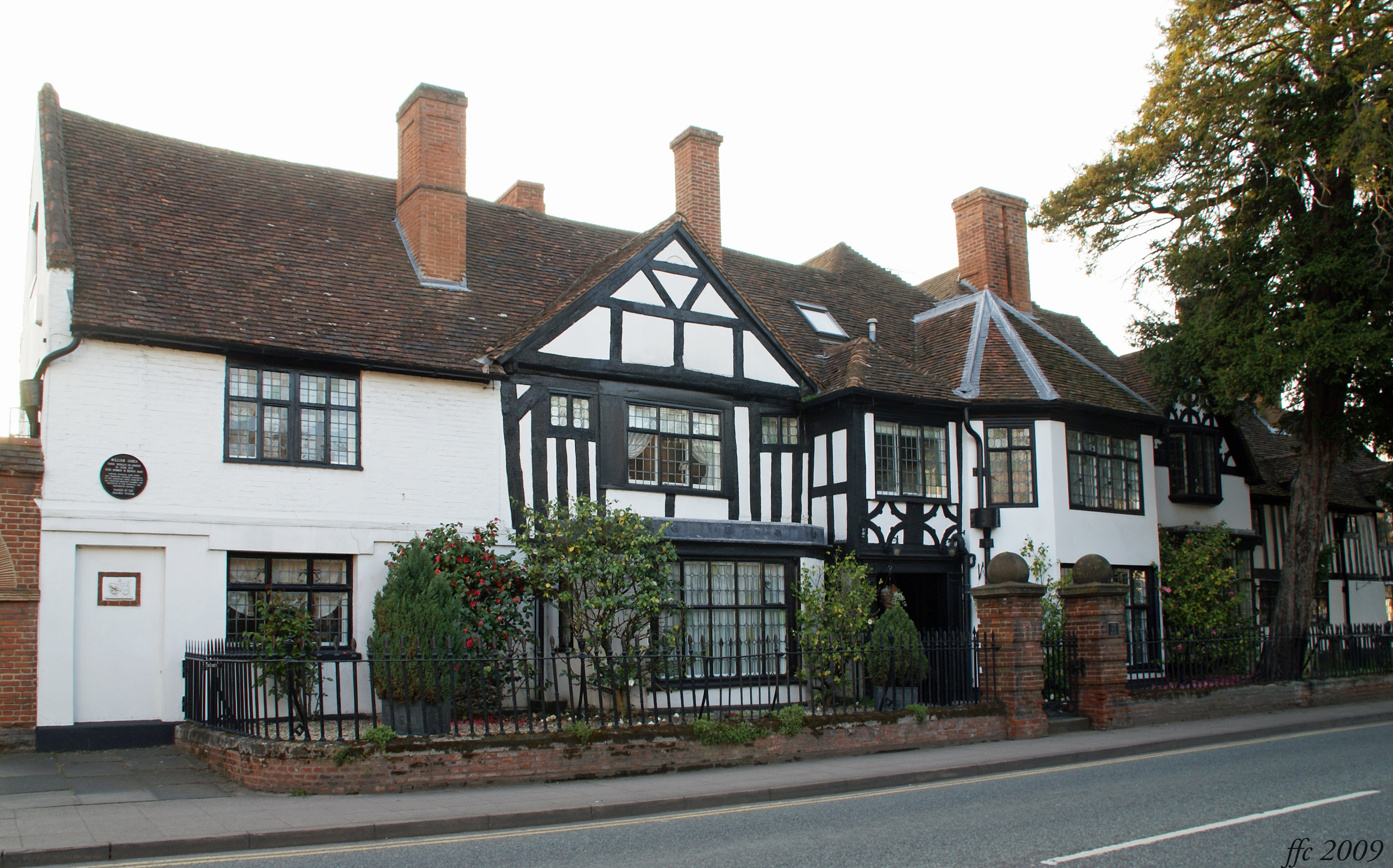
The Yew Trees in Henley-in-Arden where James lived when first married.

William James was born in Henley-in-Arden in Warwickshire in 1771, the second of the seven children of William James, a solicitor from Moseley near Birmingham, and his wife Mary, who came from a wealthy and well-connected family in Kings Norton. The young James was educated at The King's School, Warwick (Now Warwick School); at another school in Winson Green, Birmingham and at Lincoln's Inn in London. After training and qualifying as a solicitor in Birmingham, he returned to Henley-in-Arden around 1797 to work in his father's practice.

On 4 September 1793 in Wootton Wawen, a mile south of Henley-in-Arden, James married Dinah Tarleton, the daughter of local landowners. The couple settled at the Yew Trees in Henley-in-Arden High Street and enjoyed a high social standing locally, mixing socially with landowners and aristocracy from across the county.

=== Land agent ===
James's father was a wealthy man and a local Justice of the Peace, but the share price collapse that accompanied the panic of 1797 led to increased financial pressures for the family and the solicitors' practice. In 1798 the younger William James started a new career as a land agent, initially managing the estate of the Dewes family of Wellesbourne Hall, Warwickshire.

He supervised estates in the West Midlands and beyond for, amongst others, the Dewes family; the Earl of Warwick, of Warwick Castle (but with property widely distributed); the Yates family of Lancashire; the Earl of Dartmouth at Sandwell Park, West Bromwich; the Archbishop of Canterbury at Lambeth in London; and the Agar family of Lanhydrock House in Cornwall. James sought unsuccessfully for coal in East Sussex but successfully operated coal mines in his own right in south Staffordshire. Having an understanding of geology, James invariably advised his clients to concentrate on realising the mineral wealth of their estates and it was in this connection that he first began to propose railways, including, in 1802/03, an early version of the Bolton and Leigh Railway.

=== Railway work ===
James first became interested in the potential for railways and planning possible routes in 1799. As early as 1806 he had realised that the horse-drawn railways that had been a common means of transporting goods in and around collieries for almost two centuries could form the basis of a national system of public transportation. Uniquely among early railway pioneers, he saw the value of railways in rapidly transporting passengers as well as freight and minerals.

It seems likely that in 1808 James attended the demonstration running of Richard Trevithick's steam locomotive Catch me who can in London; certainly at this time he began to consider the long-term development of this means of transport, although he recognised that something more durable than cast iron would be needed for the rails themselves. For example, at the time of the Napoleonic Wars of 1815, he wrote to the Prince Regent proposing a railway link between the two principal naval dockyards at Chatham and Portsmouth which in peacetime could be used for passenger traffic; and in 1820/21 he promoted a Central Junction Railway from Stratford-upon-Avon to Paddington in London. In 1821 he made several trips to inspect railway developments in the Northumberland coalfield and met George Stephenson of Killingworth Colliery, his son Robert and the ironfounder William Losh. This resulted in an agreement for James to market the Stephenson/Losh patent locomotive (which James branded as the Land-Agent type) in England south of the Humber-Mersey line, with a supplementary agreement for Stephenson and Losh to use the patent for multitubular locomotive boilers taken out by William Henry James, William James's son.

In 1822 James, with his brother-in-law Paul Padley as chief surveyor, began on behalf of Joseph Sandars, a Liverpool businessman, and others to survey a route for the Liverpool and Manchester Railway in Lancashire; and in 1823-4 he surveyed three possible routes for the Canterbury and Whitstable Railway in Kent. He was also during this period advocating railways as an extension to the Grand Surrey Canal and as an alternative to the (never-built) London and Cambridge Junction Canal; and steam locomotives for the Surrey Iron Railway. Stephenson, however, was never prepared to produce locomotives for James to demonstrate to potential clients and no sales were made through his agency.

=== Misfortunes ===
In 1822–3, James spent time in the King's Bench Prison in Southwark for debt (during which time he wrote a scheme for a network of railways in the south of England) and later in 1823 he was adjudged bankrupt. The distractions caused by this, by his involvement in so many projects simultaneously, and by bouts of illness, tended to prevent James from personally bringing to fruition any of the railway projects he had helped to initiate. In 1824, George Stephenson, assisted by Padley, was appointed surveyor to the Liverpool and Manchester Railway, largely utilising the route projected by James, and in the following year Stephenson was made engineer of the Canterbury and Whitstable, using James's least preferred route. James's visionary steam-worked 100 mi (160 km) Central Junction Railway emerged as the 16 mi (26 km) horse-worked Stratford and Moreton Tramway opened in 1826 with John Urpeth Rastrick as surveyor and Robert Stephenson senior (George's brother) in an engineering capacity.

=== Waterways ===
Although recognising that railways were the coming mode of transport, James inherited inland waterways interests from his father. He was on the managing committee of the Stratford-upon-Avon Canal, seeing it through to completion in 1816, including the money-saving proposal to construct the Edstone Aqueduct in cast iron; and he also held shares in the Upper Avon Navigation.

=== Later career ===
In 1827 James moved to Bodmin in Cornwall primarily to improve the estates of Anna-Maria Agar of Lanhydrock. He had plans to develop the ports of Devoran and Truro and build a railway from Fowey to Padstow, none of which came to fruition under his management. Following a winter journey by mail coach he contracted pneumonia of which he died at Bodmin early in 1837.

=== Personal life ===
James was a freemason, a member of the Royal Society of Arts, and, during the Napoleonic Wars, had been an officer in the Warwickshire Regiment of Yeomanry Cavalry. He married his first wife, Dinah Tarleton, in 1793 and they had eight children. Following her death in 1830, he married Elizabeth Butt, 36 years his junior, in 1832, and they had two more daughters. It was said of him that "though corpulent, his manners were elegant and easy." William James and his eldest son William Henry James (1796–1873) were patentees of a number of inventions related to the improvement of transport.

== Reputation ==
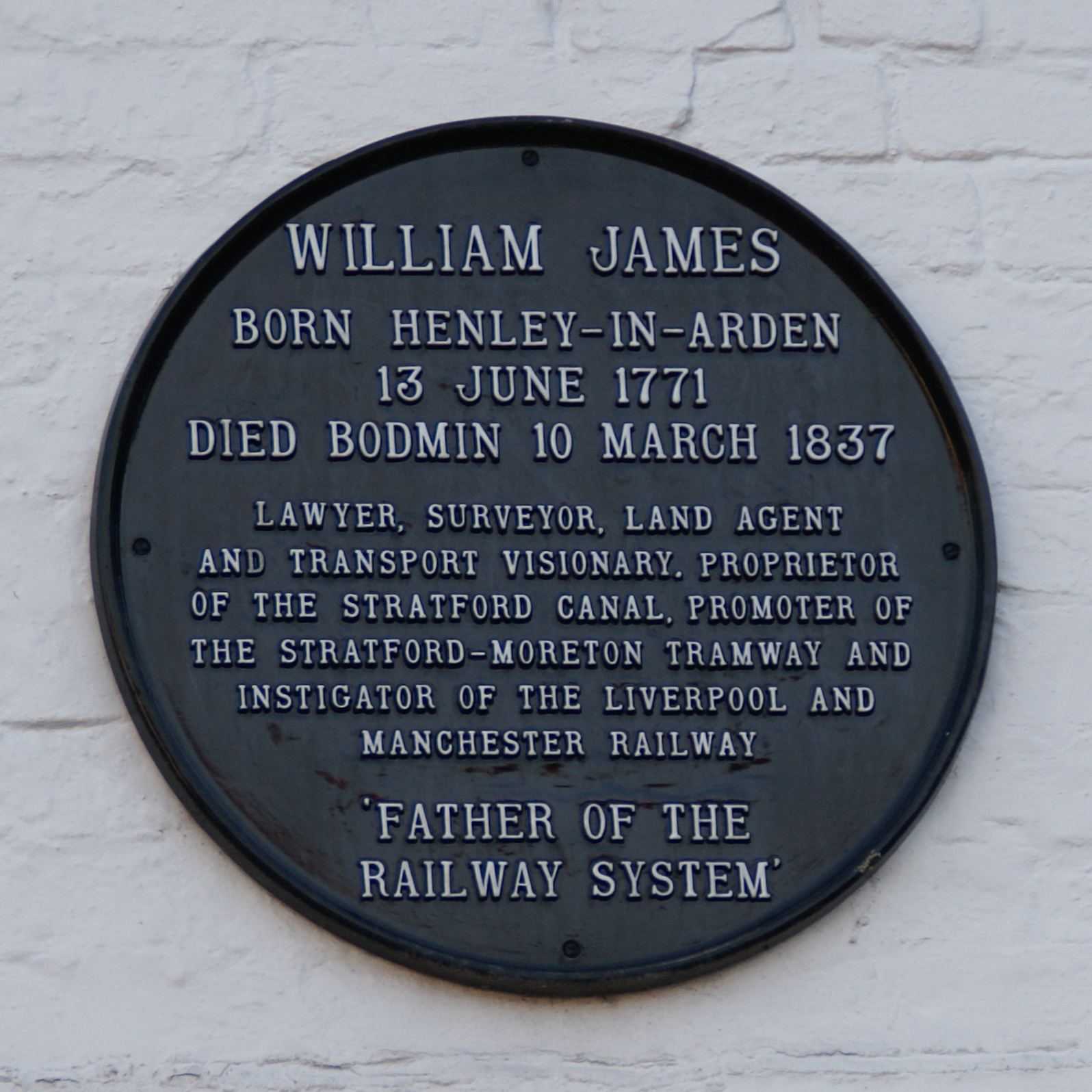
Henley-in-Arden, Memorial plaque

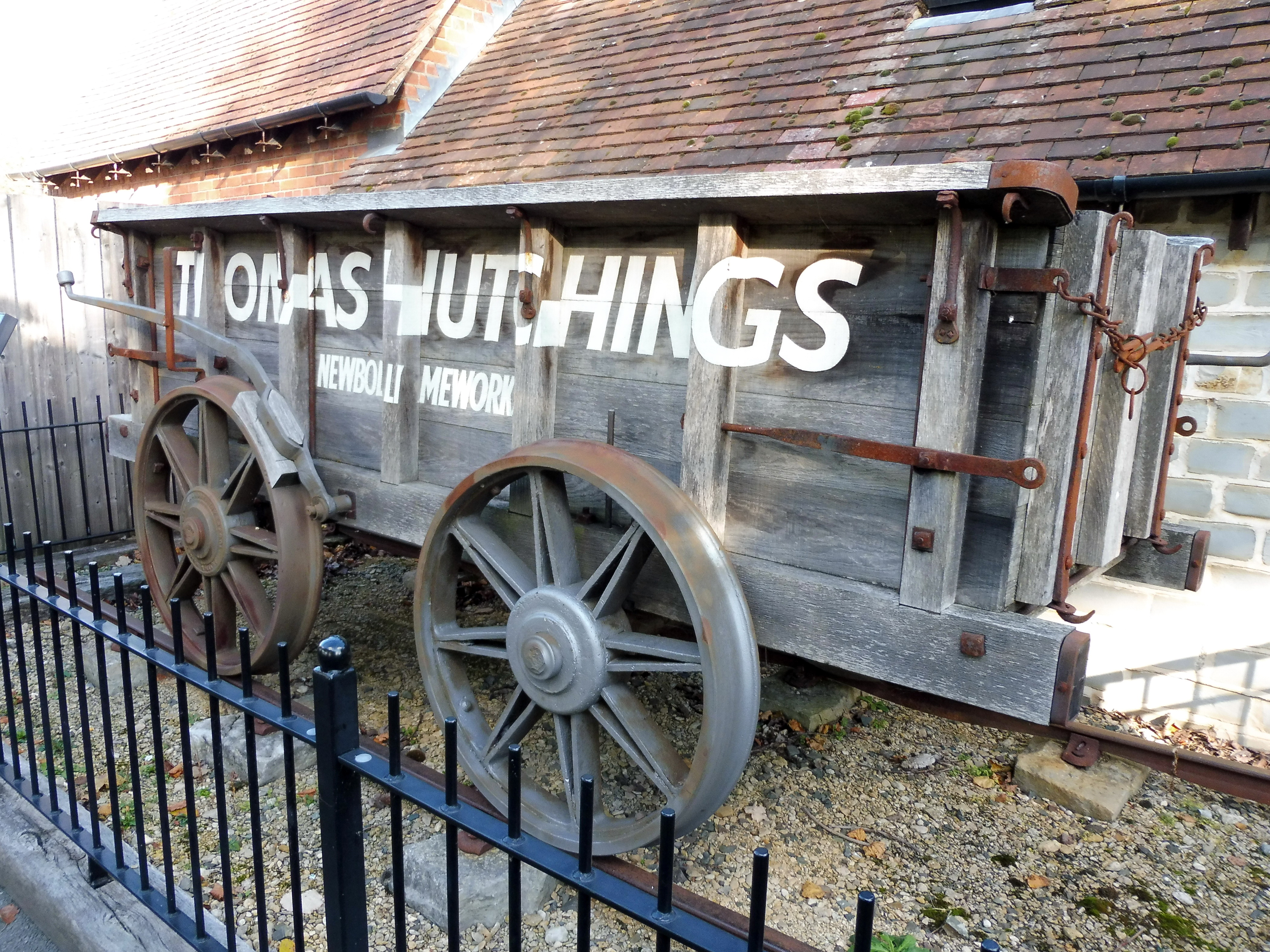
The restored tramway wagon on display in Stratford-upon-Avon

Partly because he was never acknowledged by George Stephenson (although the younger Robert and other engineers remained sympathetic), James received little recognition for his work and written memorials to Parliament for financial help both by himself around 1826 and, after his death, on behalf of his children in 1846 were abandoned. Annoyed by her father's treatment in Samuel Smiles's biographies of Stephenson one of James's daughters, Ellen Paine, wrote a defence of him in which, as even a sympathetic historian, L. T. C. Rolt, concludes, she "defeats her own object by overstating her case" and it was not until 2007 that a substantive biography appeared. He is commemorated by a plaque on a former residence in Henley-in-Arden and a scheme to restore a Stratford and Moreton Tramway wagon in Stratford. He also has a road named after him in the David Wilson 'Henley Point' Development in Henley in Arden, named William James Way

== Bibliography ==
- Macnair, Miles (2007). William James (1771–1837): the man who discovered George Stephenson. Oxford: Railway and Canal Historical Society. ISBN 978-0-901461-54-4.
- Torrens, Hugh (1998). "Coal hunting at Bexhill 1805–1811: how the new science of stratigraphy was ignored". Sussex Archaeological Collections. 136: 177–91. doi:10.5284/1085040.
