= Midland Baptist Association =

The Midland Baptist Association was an association of Particular Baptist churches formed in the English Midlands in 1655. Representatives from seven churches met at Warwick and agreed on "Sixteen Articles of Faith and Order". The association met regularly throughout the Interregnum, and circulated print copies of the Sixteen Articles amongst churches and households. In recruiting to the Association, General Baptists were particularly excluded.

During the Stuart Restoration, meetings stopped due to government persecution of nonconformist churches, for example by the Act of Uniformity 1662. Some members of the association were arrested for their beliefs during this period, including one of the founders, Reverend James Wilmot of Hook Norton.

The Association was re-formed and meetings recommenced in the 1690s, following the Glorious Revolution and the Toleration Act 1688. Some troubles were encountered as verifiable copies of the original articles and confessions were hard to come by, leading to a less-coherent understanding of the Association's doctrines than had originally existed. Of note is a letter from Bromsgrove in 1787, which expressed concerns about the growing inclusion of General Baptists. Consequently, in 1790, the Association defined the standards for the admission of a church, that being that it preached the doctrines of "personal election, particular redemption, free justification, efficacious grace, and the final perseverance of the saints."

By 1855, the Association included at least 29 churches, but it was noted that those congregations were dwindling in many cases.

The Association included prominent members such as the preacher and hymn writer Benjamin Beddome of Bourton-on-the-Water, and Peter Stanford, Britain's first African American Baptist minister.

== The Sixteen Articles of Faith and Order ==
The content of the Sixteen Articles can be summarised as follows:

1. Belief in one true god.
2. Belief in the Trinity.
3. Belief in the Bible as the word of God.
4. Belief in the fall of man and original sin.
5. Belief in Election.
6. Belief that election is the Will of God.
7. Belief in the story of Jesus and that his death was for the redemption of the Elect.
8. Belief that faith is a gift from God and cannot be chosen.
9. Belief that Christ is the only true King, Priest, and Prophet of the Church.
10. Belief in justification by Christ alone and not by works.
11. Belief in the Resurrection and Ascension of Jesus, and his intercession for man.
12. Assertion that the faithful should act from principles of faith and love, to the end of the Glory Of God
13. Belief that those who claim faith and act in faith are proper Baptists
14. Belief in immersion baptism
15. Assertion that baptised members of the church should care for one another
16. Belief in the Last Judgment
