= Stratford Observer =

Newspaper in United Kingdom

- Type: Weekly newspaper
- Circulation: 3,124 (as of 2022)

The Stratford Observer is a free weekly newspaper distributed in Stratford-upon-Avon and the surrounding area in Warwickshire.

It is distributed to 27,000 homes across Stratford district including the town and surrounding villages such as Bidford-on-Avon and Henley-in-Arden. Its publication date is Thursday.

The newspaper is part of Bullivant Media Ltd which has titles across Warwickshire and the West Midlands.

Its content and editorial is currently run by editor in chief Ian Hughes, his deputy Laura Kearns and its photographer, Bullivant Media's Warwickshire & West Midlands chief photographer Jon Mullis.
