= Henley Sidings =

Nature reserve in Warwickshire, England

Coordinates: 52.298555°N 1.7856726°W

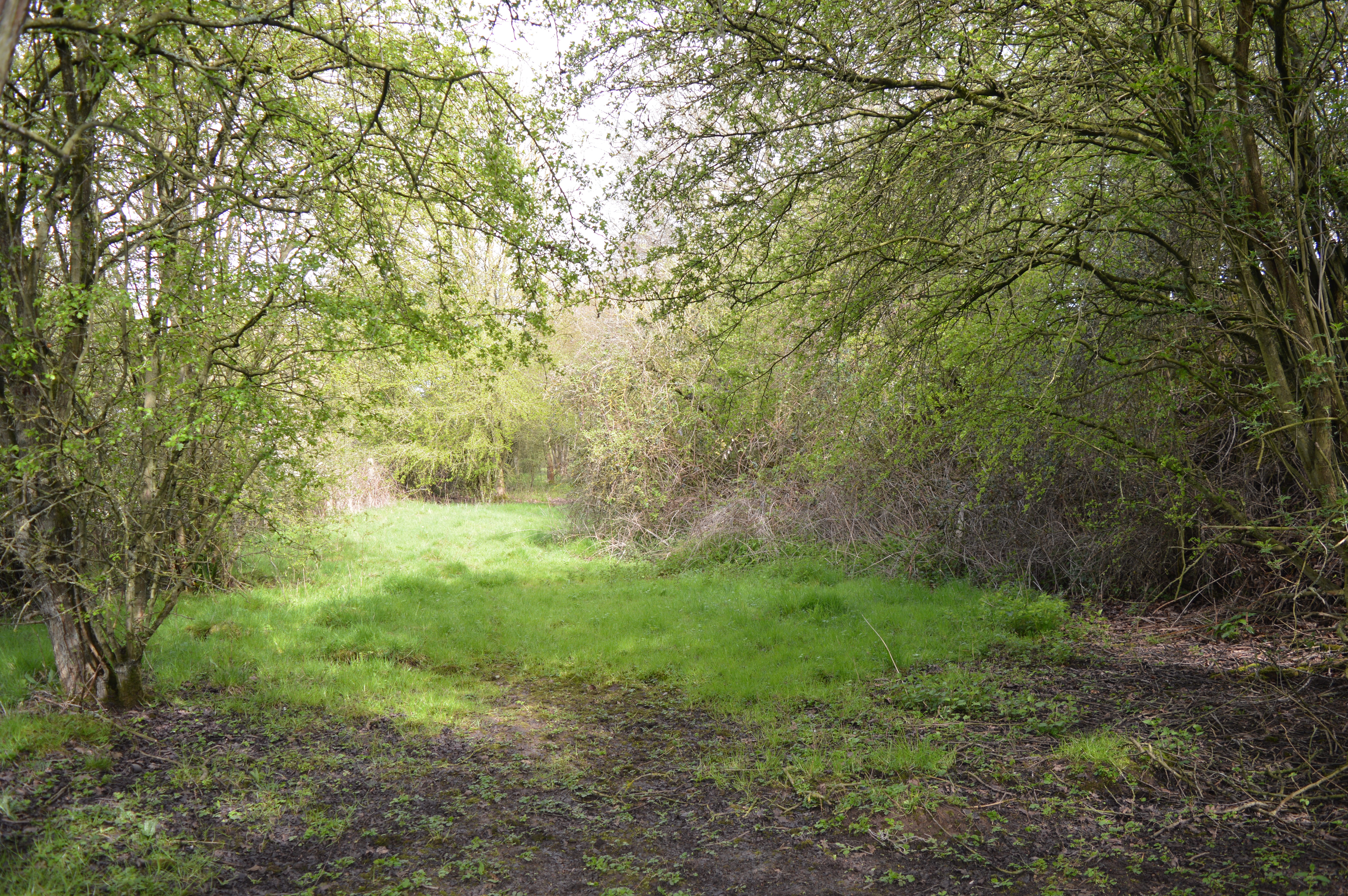

Henley Sidings is a 1.4-hectare (3.5-acre) nature reserve near Henley-in-Arden in the county of Warwickshire, England. It is managed by the Warwickshire Wildlife Trust.

The site is a 500 metre long railway embankment adjacent to the North Warwickshire Line. It is limestone grassland and scrub, which has a variety of wild flowers including woolly thistle, fairy flax and lady's bedstraw. The sward is maintained by rabbits, and there are other fauna such as yellow meadow ants, 20 species of butterfly, around 200 of beetle, and butterflies and moths.

The entrance to the reserve is next to the gate to Park Farm, off the access road to the Henley Golf and Country Club.
