= Beaudesert, Warwickshire =

Villages in England

Coordinates: 52.292°N 1.777°W

Beaudesert
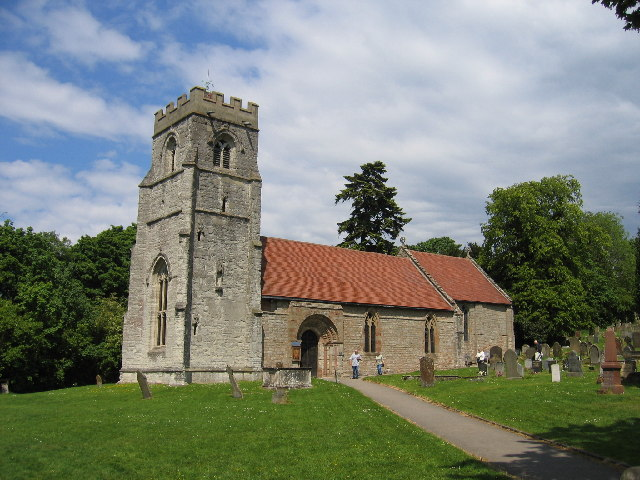
- St Nicholas Church

- Location within Warwickshire
- Population: 990 (2011census)
- OS grid reference: SP1566
- Civil parish: Henley-in-Arden
- District: Stratford-on-Avon
- Shire county: Warwickshire
- Region: West Midlands
- Country: England
- Sovereign state: United Kingdom
- Post town: HENLEY-IN-ARDEN
- Postcode district: B95
- Dialling code: 01564
- Police: Warwickshire
- Fire: Warwickshire
- Ambulance: West Midlands
- UK Parliament: Warwick and Leamington

Beaudesert (pronounced /ˈbɛlzər/) is a village, civil parish and former manor in the Stratford-on-Avon district of Warwickshire, England, immediately east across the River Alne to the east of Henley-in-Arden, to which it is closely associated and shares a joint parish council with. The main village, consisting of the church and a single short street of houses, stands close to the river and directly opposite Henley Church. Behind the village to the east rises the hill, locally known as 'The Mount', crowned with the earthwork remains of Beaudesert Castle of the De Montforts. According to the 2001 Census it had a population of 919, increasing to 990 at the 2011 Census.

== History ==
The manor is not mentioned in the Domesday Book but is now thought to have been included in the entry for Preston Bagot, as part of the lands of the Count of Meulan, Robert of Beaumont, who had inherited Meulan through his mother. The portion recorded there appears without doubt to have been the present-day Beaudesert. It was believed to have been anciently known as Donnilee, the name implying the place of a fort; However, recent writers such as the Victoria County History have refuted this and Donnelie is now reckoned to be Honiley in the latest editions of the Domesday Book. Cooper wrote, "Beaudesert does not occur in the Domesday Book and William Dugdale conjectures that the place Donnele is identical with it, but recent investigation does not support this view". Beaudesert is the name given to it by the Norman family that settled here, meaning "the beautiful waste".

The Domesday Book entry states; "In Ferncombe Hundred, in Prestetone (Preston Bagot), 5 hides. Hugh holds from him. Land for 3 ploughs. In lordship 1/2 plough; 2 slaves; 1 villager and 3 smallholders with 1 plough. The value was 30s; now 40s. Brictnoth held it freely before 1066". The Manor passed from the Count of Meulan to Henry de Beaumont, who enfeoffed his great-nephew Thurstan, the first of the De Montforts of Beaudesert, and the builder of the castle. About the year 1140, Thurstan obtained from the Empress Matilda the right to hold a market on Sundays at his castle of Beaudesert. He was succeeded by his son Henry, who died in 1191 and then by his son, Thurstan who, dying in 1216, was succeeded by his son Peter, a minor, and who became a ward of William de Cantelupe of Aston Cantlow; it was this association which led him to later side with the Barons.

Peter de Montfort became the most powerful of all the de Montforts and in him the family was at the height of its glory. Peter obtained on, 10 February 1227 the grant of a market on Monday and a yearly fair at his manor of Beaudesert to be held on 'the eve, feast, and morrow of St. Giles'. In the Second Barons' War he sided against the king, Henry III and was one of those who formulated the Provisions of Oxford in 1258. He was taken prisoner at Northampton, but was released and following the Peace of Canterbury was elected one of the council of nine. He was killed fighting beside his kinsman Simon de Montfort, although the exact relationship is not known, at the Battle of Evesham in 1265. His eldest son Peter was taken prisoner at Evesham and placed in the custody of Thomas de Clare, to whom his forfeited lands were granted, but shortly afterwards he was pardoned and his lands restored to him. The manor then descended to his son John and then to his son, John who was aged 5 at his father's death, in 1296, and named as heir to the castle of Beaudesert.

This John was concerned in the execution of Piers Gaveston, but was afterwards pardoned and died fighting for Edward II at the Battle of Bannockburn in 1314. As John left no issue, Beaudesert and Henley in Arden passed to Peter his brother who had one son named Guy, married to Margaret, daughter of Thomas de Beauchamp, Earl of Warwick. In 1349, the manor and castle of Beaudesert and the manor of Henley were settled on Guy with contingent reversion to the Earl of Warwick. Guy died in 1361, before his father, without issue, so after Peter de Montfort's death the manors reverted to the Earl of Warwick, who died in 1369. His son Thomas granted the manors to his brother William de Beauchamp for life in 1376. At his death in 1410 they were divided between William Boteler of Sudeley Castle and Baldwin Freville, son of Sir Baldwin Freville, who were descended from sisters of the last Peter de Montfort.

== Notable buildings ==
The parish church, dedicated to St Nicholas was built in 1070 and despite restoration in the 19th century still contains many Norman parts. The chancel and south wall of the nave including the fine south doorway are Norman, the north doorway is also of this date but the north wall is later, the width of the nave having been reduced from its original width, as it cuts into the Norman chancel arch. The tower, of the 15th century, again is smaller than may be expected and not centred on either the original nor revised axis of the nave. This may be due to parsimony or the instability of the ground, this instability may be the reason for moving the north wall, all of which leave a number of unsolved architectural issues. The chancel roof, which appears to be a fine piece of Norman vaulting is really an addition of the 19th century, certainly after 1846, probably in 1869. Much of the stained glass is by Morris & Co. Of the six ringing bells (previously an unringable ring of three bells but restored and augmented in October 2013 by redundant bells from other towers) there are three historic bells: one inscribed "ave maria gratia pelan", another "ihesvs nazsarinvs rex ivdeorvm", both in Lombardic capitals; they date from about 1350. A third is dated 1711, by Joseph Smith of Edgbaston. It is most notable for the ruined Beaudesert Castle.

== Notable people ==
- William Booth, who was hanged for forgery in 1812 was born at Hall End Farm near Beaudesert and baptised there on 21 February 1776. One of eight children of a farmer and church warden, John Booth, and his wife Mary. He is the subject of the song "Twice Tried, Twice Hung, Twice Buried" by John Raven. He converted the top floor of his farmhouse in Great Barr, Birmingham into a workshop where he produced forgeries of coins and banknotes. He was caught, tried at Stafford Assizes and sentenced to hang. Booth's execution was bungled, and he fell through the scaffold's trap door, to the floor; however, within two hours, he was hanged again and died.
- Richard Jago, the poet, was born in 1715 at Beaudesert Rectory, Henley in Arden where his father Richard was rector. Educated at Solihull School, one of the houses is named after him, where he met another minor poet William Shenstone. From there he went to University College where he took his MA in 1738 having been made curate at Snitterfield the previous year. He became vicar of Harbury in 1746 and shortly after Chesterton both in Warwickshire followed by Snitterfield in 1754 where he took up residence until his death in 1781. Baron Willoughby de Broke presented him with the rectory at Kimcote in Leicestershire in 1771 and he resigned Harbury and Chesterton keeping Snitterfield and Kimcote. His best known poem is the long topographical, Edge Hill (1767).

== Source ==
- Beaudesert, Eng. (Parish) (1931). The Records of Beaudesert, Henley-in-Arden, Co. Warwick. Leeds: J. Whitehead & Son Ltd.
