= Henley-in-Arden =

Town in Warwickshire, England

Coordinates: 52.291°N 1.778°W

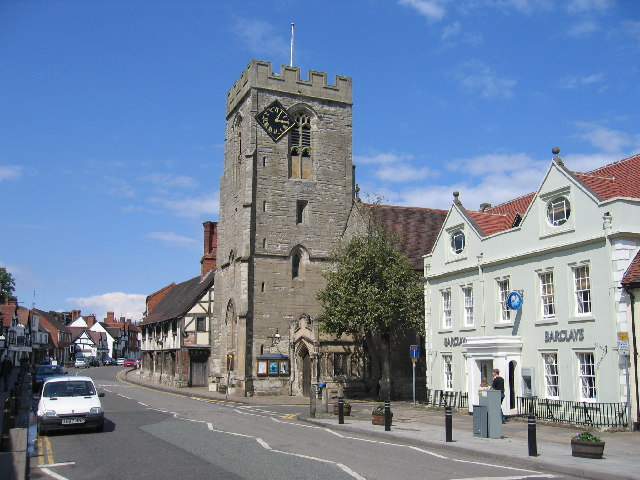
- High Street

- Location within Warwickshire
- Population: 1,828 (parish 2021); 3,000 (built-up area 2021)
- OS grid reference: SP1566
- Civil parish: Henley-in-Arden
- District: Stratford-on-Avon
- Shire county: Warwickshire
- Region: West Midlands
- Country: England
- Sovereign state: United Kingdom
- Post town: HENLEY-IN-ARDEN
- Postcode district: B95
- Dialling code: 01564
- Police: Warwickshire
- Fire: Warwickshire
- Ambulance: West Midlands
- UK Parliament: Stratford-on-Avon

Henley-in-Arden (also known as simply Henley) is a market town and civil parish in the Stratford-on-Avon District in Warwickshire, England. The town takes its last name from the former Forest of Arden. Henley is known for its variety of historic buildings, some of which date back to medieval times, and its wide variety of preserved architectural styles. The one-mile-long (1.6 km) High Street is a conservation area.

In 2021 the population of the civil parish of Henley-in-Arden was recorded as 1,828. The population of its urban area, which includes adjoining Beaudesert, was exactly 3,000.

== Location and geography ==
Henley-in-Arden is approximately 9 miles (14 km) west of the county town of Warwick, 15 miles (24 km) southeast of Birmingham, 19 miles (31 km) southwest of Coventry, 8 miles (13 km) east of Redditch and 9 miles (14 km) north of Stratford upon Avon (where the road between Stratford and Henley was named Henley Street^{1}). The county border with Worcestershire is 5.5 miles (8.9 km) to the west.

It is in the valley of the River Alne, which separates Henley from the adjacent settlement of Beaudesert. Henley and Beaudesert effectively form a single entity, and share a joint parish council, although Beaudesert is a separate civil parish.

The town lies at a crossroads between the A3400 and the A4189 roads and is the starting point for the circular Arden Way path. It also lies on the Heart of England Way. Henley Sidings is a nature reserve managed by the Warwickshire Wildlife Trust.

== History ==
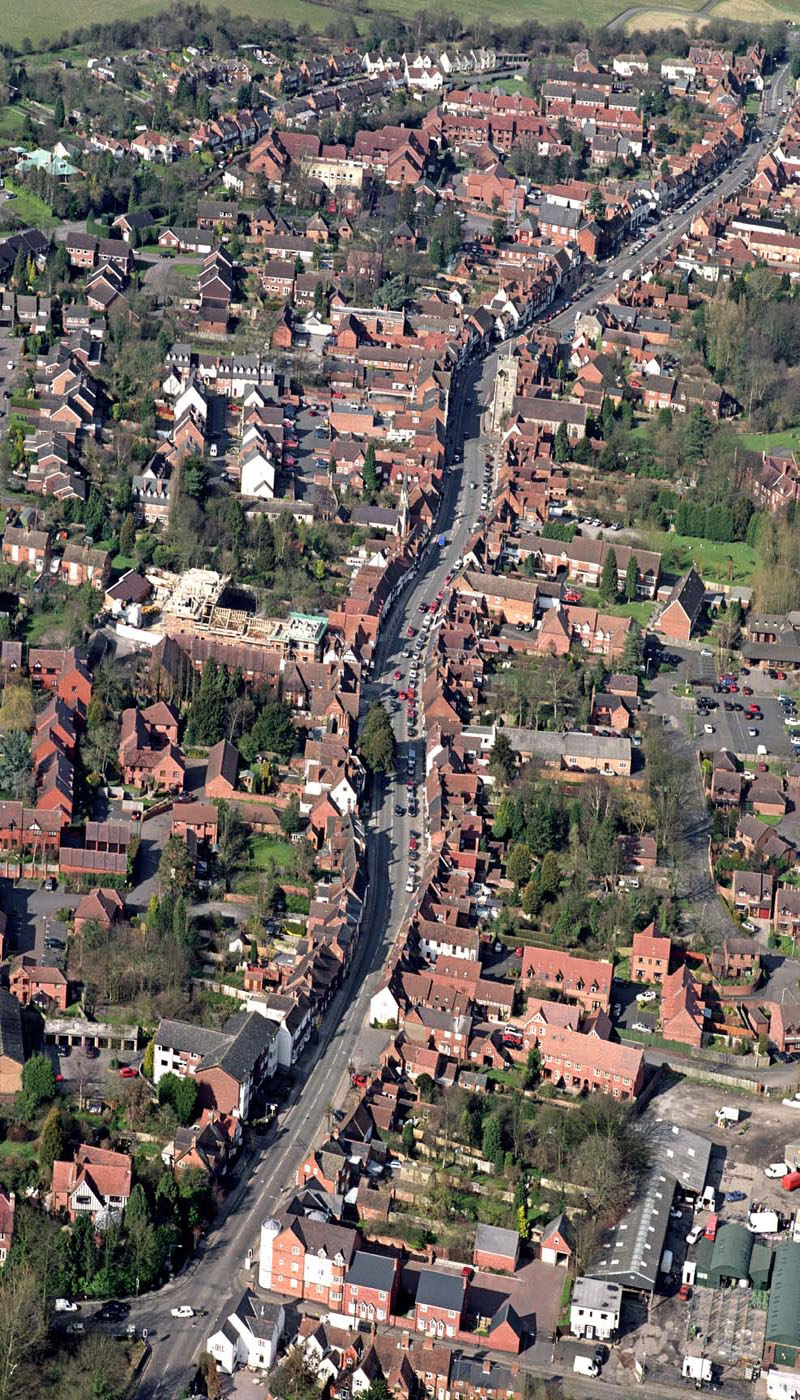
Aerial photo of Henley-in-Arden (June 2008)

Henley-in-Arden is not listed in the Domesday Book and may not have existed until the 12th century. The first record of the town is in a legal instrument drawn during the reign of Henry II. It was originally a hamlet of Wootton Wawen, on Feldon Street, the original route out of the Forest of Arden.

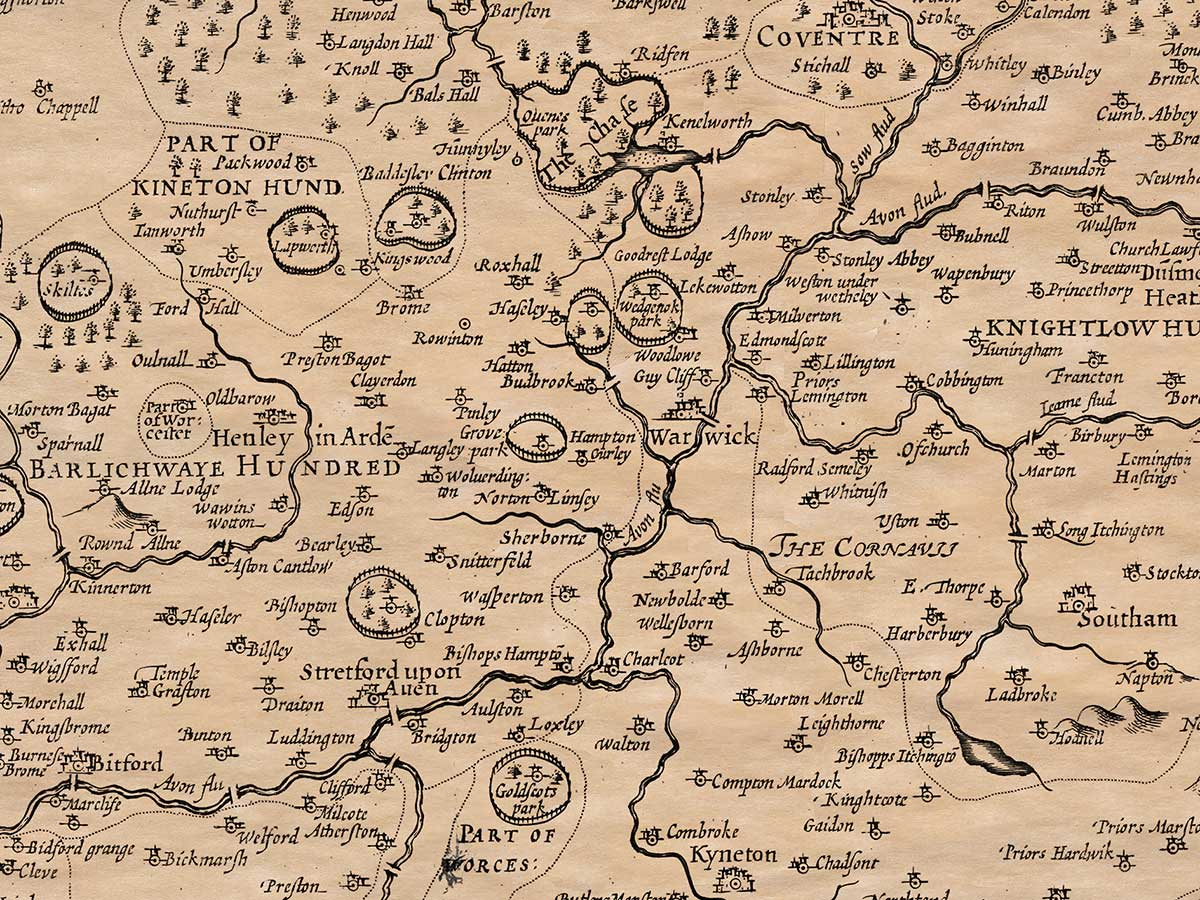
John Speede c.1610

In the 11th century, a Thurstan de Montfort constructed Beaudesert Castle, a motte and bailey castle, on the hill above Beaudesert. In 1140, the Empress Matilda granted the right to hold a market at the castle in 1141 and Henley soon became a prosperous market town, conveniently located on the busy Birmingham-to-Stratford road. In 1220 in the reign of Henry III, the lord of the manor, Peter de Montfort, procured the grant of a weekly Monday market and an annual fair to last two days, for the town.

The initial prosperity came to an end during the Second Barons' War when, in 1265, Peter de Montfort died fighting at the Battle of Evesham. The royalist forces won, and the town and castle were burnt in reprisal. The town and castle recovered however and Henley became a borough in 1296. In 1315 all of the recorded townsfolk were freemen. The King stayed at the castle for 7 days in January 1324. By 1336 the market was so prosperous that the inhabitants were able to obtain a licence from Edward III to impose a local sales tax on all goods brought to the market, for a period of three years, in order to pay for the cost of paving the streets. The Lord of the Manor, Peter de Montfort 3rd Baron Montfort, as Commissioner of Array for Warwickshire sent 160 archers to the Battle of Crecy during the Hundred Years' War in 1346. By the 15th century, the lords of the manor were the Boteler family. Ralph Boteler, 1st Baron Sudeley obtained a charter from Henry VI in 1449, confirming the grant of the new weekly market, and a grant for two annual fairs.

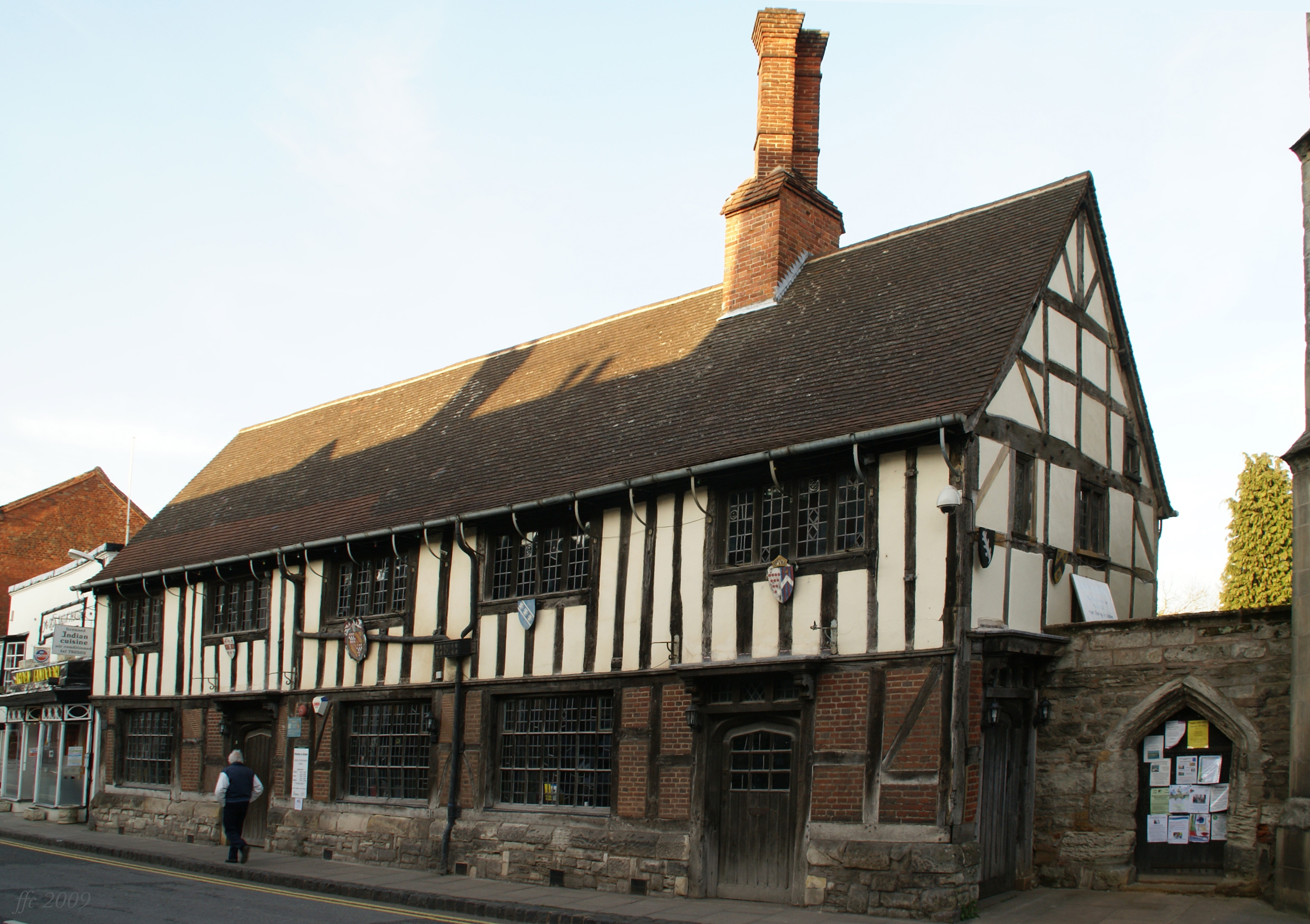
The Guild Hall of Henley-in-Arden

The town suffered another misfortune during the English Civil War, when in 1643 Prince Rupert who was in charge of the Royalist forces, marched his soldiers through the town in 1643 on his way to Birmingham and pillaged the neighbourhood.

As a non-chartered market town, Henley's administration was based upon a manorial court. Under the lord of the manor were a high bailiff, a low bailiff, a third-borough, a constable, and pairs of ale-tasters, chamberlains, leathersealers, brook lookers, fieldreeves, and affearors. These local borough officials were chosen annually by a meeting of former bailiffs and constables, and were members of the jury of the biannual court leet. The bailiff, accompanied by his predecessors, would formally open the annual town fair. The town hall was inherited from a medieval Guild. The records of the court leet and the court baron in Henley date from 1592 onwards. The court rolls are largely concerned with (in Dyer's words) modest problems, such as preventing the poor from migrating into the town (which burgers considered would become a burden on the rates and result in the destruction of hedges for fuel), the ringing of loose pigs, and the prevention of horses being parked in the streets. The poor were a significant problem for Henley's court leet. In the early 17th century there was a marked increase in the landless poor, squatting on commons and on wasteland in the Forest of Arden, and such people were generally regarded as violent and criminal by townsfolk. Between 1590 and 1620 there were a disproportionate number of people, relative to the size of the population, presented by the court leet for engaging in violent affray, something which Underdown states to be "surely no coincidence". In Love's Labours Lost Rosaline says "Better wits have worn plain Statute Caps.". This is believed to be a reference to events in Henley during the writing of that play, before its publication, when the denizens of Henley were prosecuted in the court leet for being in breach of a statute (enacted with the aim of ensuring economic support for the wool industry) that required the wearing of woollen caps on Sundays and other holy days.

By 1814, Henley had a weekly market every Monday, three annual fairs (on Lady Day; on Tuesday in Whitsunday-week, for cattle; and on 29 October for horses, cattle, sheep, and hops), and a population in 1811 (according to returns made to Parliament) of 1,055 (with 242 inhabited houses and 12 uninhabited houses).

Although the castle no longer remains, several other historical buildings and structures still exist in the town, such as the parish churches of St. Nicholas and St. John the Baptist, the 15th century Guildhall (which has been restored), the medieval market cross (much of the decoration of whose shaft has been mutilated but which has three ranges of kneeling places and sculptures representing the Holy Trinity, the crucifixion of Jesus, and, it is believed, St Peter), the 16th century White Swan, and several half timbered residences along High Street, the main street of the town.

=== Lunatic asylums ===
Historically, Henley has had several private lunatic asylums. The first was licensed in 1744, which housed pauper lunatics at the expense of the parish. Another was run by Thomas Burman in 1795, who charged "one guinea/week for board and medicines, the patient finding their own linen and washing. If any person chuses a servant constantly to attend on them, board and wages are separately considered.". There was still a private asylum in the town in the 1880s. page 55

== Transport ==
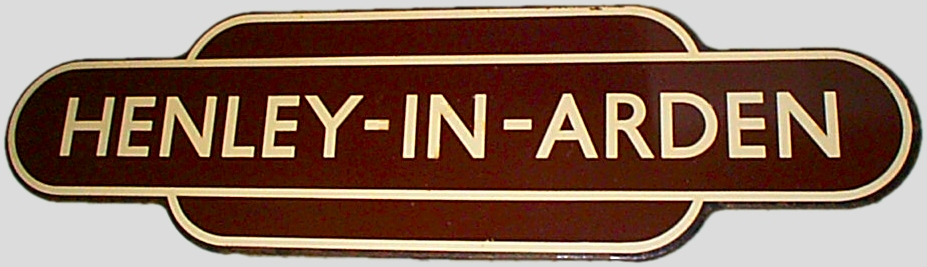
British Railways Western Region "totem" for Henley-in-Arden station.

Henley-in-Arden railway station is on the North Warwickshire Line and has regular rail services to Birmingham Moor Street and Birmingham Snow Hill and Stratford upon Avon station. The line south of Stratford upon Avon previously connected along the Honeybourne Line to Honeybourne (which is on the Cotswold Line) and onwards to Cheltenham.

The town lies a few miles southwest of the M40 motorway, which links Birmingham and London.

Bus service X20 running from Stratford-upon-Avon to Solihull runs through the town along the High Street, this service is operated by Stagecoach Midlands operating up to every 60 minutes.

== Media ==
Local news and television programmes are provided by BBC West Midlands and ITV Central. Television signals are received from either the Sutton Coldfield or Lark Stoke TV transmitters.

Local radio stations are BBC CWR, Capital Mid-Counties, Hits Radio Coventry & Warwickshire, Fresh (Coventry & Warwickshire), Heart West Midlands, Smooth West Midlands and Greatest Hits Radio Midlands.

The town's local newspapers are the Stratford Observer and Stratford Herald.

== Education ==
Schools serving the town include Henley-in-Arden Montessori Primary School, Henley-In-Arden CE Primary School, Henley-in-Arden School, Venture Academy and St Mary's RC Primary School.

== Notable people ==
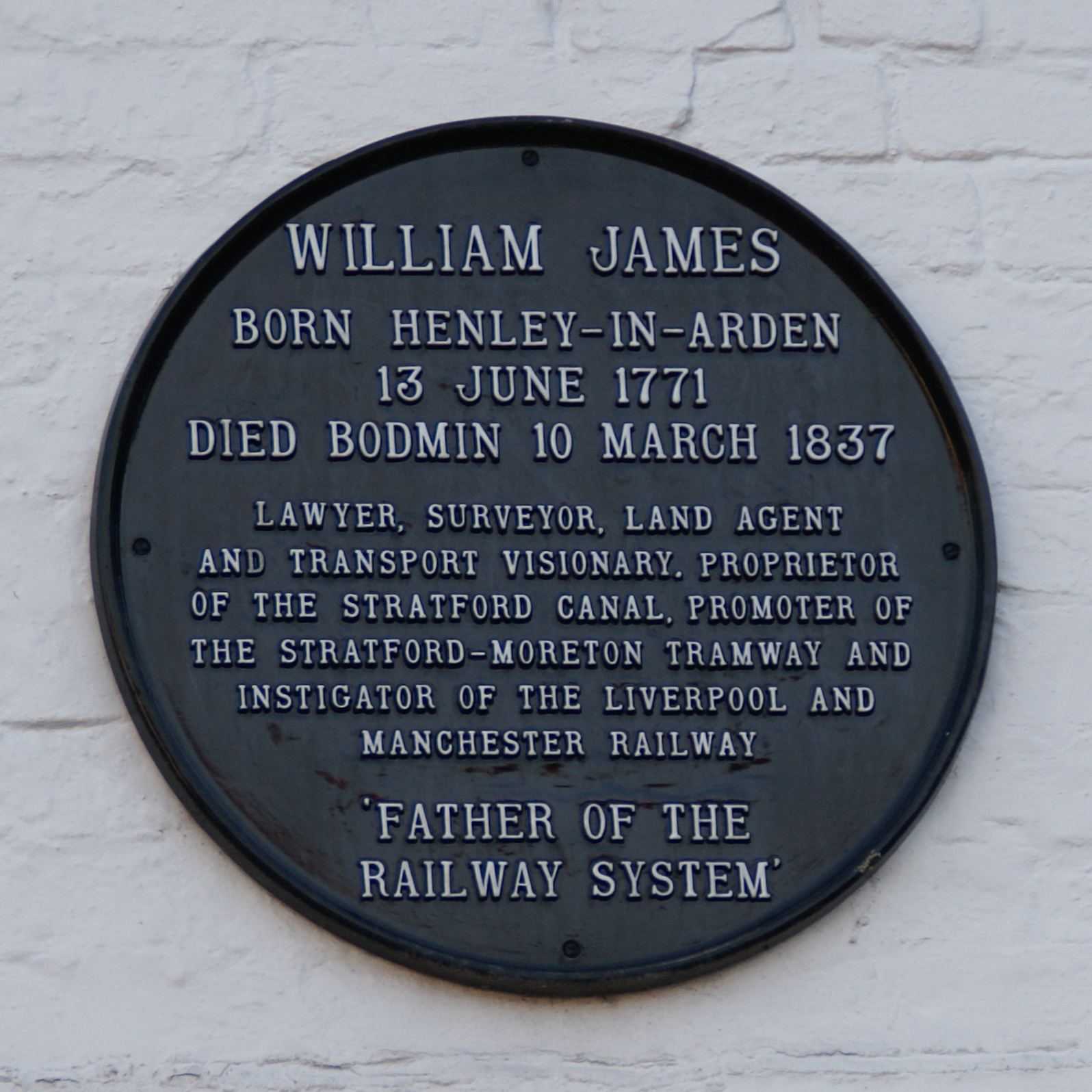
William James's Memorial Plaque at the Yew Tree's House

- Benjamin Beddome (1717–1795), hymn writer, was born in the town. Many of his hymns are in the General Baptist Hymn Book.
- Keble Howard pen name of John Keble Bell (1875–1928), author and journalist, grew up in Henley where his father was Vicar.
- William James (1771–1837), pioneer railway promoter, was born in Henley.

== Footnotes ==
- ^1 The road out of Alcester leading to Henley is also called Henley Street, a name that is in frequent use from 1772 onwards. However, at least one document before that time, a lease from 1597, calls it "Hyghe Street".
