= R S Wilshere =

Reginald Sharman Wilshere (1888–1961) MC, F.R.I.B.A., P.A.S.I., was an architect. He is best remembered for his much celebrated school designs in Belfast, Northern Ireland in the 1920s and 1930s.

Wilshere was from Essex, England and took over responsibility for building Belfast's schools in 1926. In all he oversaw the construction of 26 schools of various sizes and styles.

Wilshere's team were skilful in a number of architectural styles and are attributed to have built the first modern movement style schools anywhere in Ireland.

== The Buildings ==
1928 Glenwood Primary School, 4-22 Upper Riga St, Belfast BT13 3GW

1928 – 30 Strandtown Primary School, North Road, East Belfast Symmetrical composition in Neo Georgian style. The façade formally terminates an avenue. Matching caretaker's house incorporates changing rooms for the playing field. Scroll topped gate piers. Received RIBA Ulster Architecture Gold Medal 1930.

1930 – 33 Elmgrove Primary School, Beersbridge Road, East Belfast Informal and picturesque composition around courtyards. In South English Vernacular style. In rustic brick with plain tiled roofs. Includes a sculptural panel by John McCann depicting education reclining below the Tree of Knowledge. Opened 1932

1933-5 - Avoneil Primary School, Avoneil Road, East Belfast Modern in style. Built in brick. Includes Art Deco panels depicting stylised elephants. The building was built by WM Logan and Sons Ltd and opened in August 1935

1934- 6 - Nettlefield Primary School, East Belfast Built on the site of nettlefield House, near Woodstock Road. In Dudok's Dutch brick style with tower and glazed lantern.

1936 – Botanic Primary School, South Belfast

1936 - McQuiston Memorial School, Donegall Pass

Sydenham Infant's School, Strandburn Street, East Belfast
