= Venture Academy =

School in Warwickshire, England

Location
- Stratford Road; Henley-in-Arden, Warwickshire, B95 6AD; England
- Coordinates: 52.286019°N 1.779313°W

Information
- Type: Special school; Academy
- Local authority: Warwickshire County Council
- Trust: MacIntyre Academies
- Department for Education URN: 144633 Tables
- Ofsted: Reports
- Gender: Coeducational
- Age: 9 to 16

Venture Academy (formerly Arden Fields School) is a coeducational special school located in Henley-in-Arden, Warwickshire, England.

The school admits pupils aged 9 to 16 with autism and/or a social, emotional or mental health diagnosis. Pupils come from within Warwickshire along with a small number from neighbouring authorities.

Pupils follow a standard timetable covering all core and many optional subjects, and all have the chance to take part in enrichment programs in and out of school.

== The farm (The Barn Project) ==
At Riverhouse students help run the school farm, on the farm students look after pigs, chickens, rabbits, quails, and other small animals.
