= List of schools in Warwickshire =

This is a list of schools in Warwickshire, England:

== State-funded schools ==
=== Primary schools ===
- Abbey CE Infant School, Nuneaton
- Abbots Farm Infant School, Rugby
- Abbots Farm Junior School, Rugby
- Acorns Primary School, Long Compton
- All Saints Bedworth CE Academy & Nursery, Bedworth
- All Saints CE Academy, Leek Wootton
- All Saints CE Junior School, Warwick
- All Saints CE Primary School, Nuneaton
- Alveston CE Primary School, Tiddington
- Arden Forest Infant School, Bulkington
- Arley Primary School, Arley
- Austrey CE Primary School, Austrey
- Aylesford School, Warwick
- Barford St Peter's CE Primary School, Barford
- Bawnmore Community Infant School, Rugby
- Bidford-On-Avon CE Primary School, Bidford-on-Avon
- Bilton CE Junior School, Rugby
- Bilton Infant School, Rugby
- Binley Woods Primary School, Binley Woods
- Birchwood Primary School, Dordon
- Bishop's Itchington Primary School, Bishop's Itchington
- Bishop's Tachbrook CE Primary School, Bishop's Tachbrook
- Bishopton Primary School, Stratford-upon-Avon
- Boughton Leigh Infant School, Rugby
- Boughton Leigh Junior School, Rugby
- Bournebrook CE Primary School, Fillongley
- Brailes CE Primary School, Lower Brailes
- Briar Hill Infant School, Whitnash
- Bridgetown Primary School, Stratford-upon-Avon
- Brookhurst Primary School, Leamington Spa
- Brownsover Community Infant School, Rugby
- Budbrooke Primary School, Hampton Magna
- Burton Green CE Academy, Burton Green
- Camp Hill Primary School, Nuneaton
- The Canons CE Primary School, Bedworth
- Cawston Grange Primary School, Rugby
- Chetwynd Junior School, Nuneaton
- Chilvers Coton Community Infant School, Nuneaton
- Clapham Terrace Community Primary School, Leamington Spa
- Claverdon Primary School, Claverdon
- Clifton-upon-Dunsmore CE Primary School, Clifton upon Dunsmore
- Clinton Primary School, Kenilworth
- Coleshill CE Primary School, Coleshill
- Coten End Primary School, Warwick
- Coughton CE Primary School, Coughton, Alcester
- Croft Junior School, Nuneaton
- Cubbington CE Primary School, Cubbington
- Curdworth Primary School, Curdworth
- The Dassett CE Primary School, Fenny Compton
- Dordon Primary School, Dordon
- Dunchurch Broughton CE Infant Academy, Dunchurch
- Dunchurch Boughton CE Junior School, Dunchurch
- Dunnington CE Primary School, Alcester
- Eastlands Primary School, Rugby
- Emscote Infant School, Warwick
- English Martyrs RC Primary School, Rugby
- Ettington CE Primary School, Ettington
- Exhall Cedars Infant School, Exhall
- Exhall Junior School, Exhall
- The Ferncumbe CE Primary School, Hatton
- Galley Common Infant School, Nuneaton
- Glendale Infant School, Nuneaton
- Goodyers End Primary School, Bedworth
- Great Alne Primary School, Great Alne
- The Griffin Primary School, Rugby
- Hampton Lucy CE Primary School, Hampton Lucy
- Harbury CE Primary School, Harbury
- Heathcote Primary School, Heathcote
- Henley-In-Arden CE Primary School, Henley-in-Arden
- Henry Hinde Infant School, Rugby
- Henry Hinde Junior School, Rugby
- High Meadow Community School, Coleshill
- Hillmorton Primary School, Rugby
- Holy Trinity CE Primary School, Stratford-upon-Avon
- Hurley Primary School, Hurley
- Ilmington CE Primary School, Ilmington
- Keresley Newland Primary Academy, Keresley End
- Kineton CE Primary School, Kineton
- Kingsbury Primary School, Kingsbury
- Kingsway Community Primary School, Leamington Spa
- Knightlow CE Primary School, Stretton-on-Dunsmore
- Lapworth CE Primary School, Lapworth
- Leamington Hastings CE Academy, Leamington Hastings
- Lighthorne Heath Primary School, Lighthorne Heath
- Lillington Primary School, Leamington Spa
- Long Itchington CE Academy, Long Itchington
- Long Lawford Primary School, Long Lawford
- Lower Farm Academy, Nuneaton
- Loxley CE Community Primary School, Loxley
- Mappleborough Green CE Primary School, Mappleborough Green
- Michael Drayton Junior School, Nuneaton
- Middlemarch School, Nuneaton
- Milby Primary School, Nuneaton
- Milverton Primary School, Leamington Spa
- Moreton Morrell CE Primary School, Moreton Morrell
- Myton Gardens Primary School, Warwick
- Nathaniel Newton Infant School, Nuneaton
- The Nethersole CE Academy, Polesworth
- Newbold and Tredington CE Primary School, Tredington
- Newburgh Primary School, Warwick
- Newdigate Primary School, Bedworth
- Newton Regis CE Primary School, Newton Regis
- Northlands Primary School, Rugby
- Nursery Hill Primary School, Nuneaton
- Oakfield Primary Academy, Rugby
- Oakley School, Leamington Spa
- Our Lady & St Joseph RC Academy, Nuneaton
- Our Lady & St Teresa's RC Primary School, Cubbington
- Our Lady's RC Primary School, Alcester
- Our Lady's RC Primary School, Princethorpe
- Outwoods Primary School, Atherstone
- Paddox Primary School, Rugby
- Park Hill Junior School, Kenilworth
- Park Lane Primary School, Nuneaton
- Priors Field Primary School, Kenilworth
- The Priors School, Priors Marston
- Provost Williams CE Primary School, Ryton-on-Dunsmore
- Queen's CE Academy, Nuneaton
- Quinton Primary School, Lower Quinton
- Race Leys Infant School, Bedworth
- Race Leys Junior School, Bedworth
- Racemeadow Primary Academy, Atherstone
- Radford Semele CE Primary School, Radford Semele
- The Revel CE Primary School, Monks Kirby
- Riverside Academy, Rugby
- Rokeby Primary School, Rugby
- Rugby Free Primary School, Rugby
- St Andrew's Benn CE Primary School, Rugby
- St Anne's RC Academy, Nuneaton
- St Anthony's RC Primary School, Leamington Spa
- St Augustine's RC Primary School, Kenilworth
- St Benedict's RC Primary Academy, Atherstone
- St Edward's RC Primary School, Coleshill
- St Francis RC Academy, Bedworth
- St Gabriel's CE Academy, Rugby
- St Gregory's RC Primary School, Stratford-upon-Avon
- St James' CE Academy, Bulkington
- St John's Primary School, Kenilworth
- St Joseph's RC Primary School, Whitnash
- St Lawrence CE Primary School, Napton-on-the-Hill
- St Margaret's CE Junior School, Whitnash
- St Marie's RC Primary School, Rugby
- St Mary Immaculate RC Primary School, Warwick
- St Mary's RC Primary School, Henley-in-Arden
- St Mary's RC Primary School, Southam
- St Mary's RC Primary School, Studley
- St Matthew's Bloxham CE Primary School, Rugby
- St Michael's CE Academy, Bedworth
- St Nicholas CE Primary, Alcester
- St Nicholas CE Primary School, Kenilworth
- St Nicolas CE Academy, Nuneaton
- St Oswald's CE Academy, Rugby
- St Patrick's RC Primary School, Leamington Spa
- St Paul's CE Primary School, Leamington Spa
- St Paul's CE Primary School, Nuneaton
- St Peter's RC Primary School, Leamington Spa
- Salford Priors CE Academy, Salford Priors
- Shipston Primary School, Shipston-on-Stour
- Shottery St Andrew's CE Primary School, Shottery
- Shrubland Street Community Primary School, Leamington Spa
- Shustoke CE Primary School, Shustoke
- Snitterfield Primary School, Snitterfield
- Southam Primary School, Southam
- Southam St James CE Academy, Southam
- Stockingford Academy, Nuneaton
- Stockton Primary School, Stockton
- Stratford-upon-Avon Primary School, Stratford-upon-Avon
- Studley Infants' School, Studley
- Studley St Mary's CE Academy, Studley
- Sydenham Primary School, Leamington Spa
- Tanworth-in-Arden CE Primary School, Tanworth-in-Arden
- Telford Infant School, Leamington Spa
- Telford Junior School, Leamington Spa
- Temple Grafton CE Primary School, Temple Grafton
- Temple Herdewyke Primary School, Temple Herdewyke
- Thomas Jolyffe Primary School, Stratford-upon-Avon
- Thorns Community Infant School, Kenilworth
- Tudor Grange Primary Academy Haselor, Haselor
- Tudor Grange Primary Academy Meon Vale, Stratford-upon-Avon
- Tysoe CE Primary School, Tysoe
- Watling Meadows Primary School, Nuneaton
- Warton Nethersole's CE Primary School, Warton
- Water Orton Primary School, Water Orton
- Weddington Primary School, Nuneaton
- Welford-on-Avon Primary School, Welford-on-Avon
- Wellesbourne CE Primary School, Wellesbourne
- Wembrook Primary School, Nuneaton
- Westgate Primary School, Warwick
- Wheelwright Lane Primary School, Ash Green
- Whitestone Infant School, Nuneaton
- Whitnash Primary School, Leamington Spa
- Wilmcote CE Primary School, Wilmcote
- Wolston St Margaret's CE Primary School, Wolston
- Wolverton Primary School, Norton Lindsey
- Wolvey CE Primary School, Wolvey
- Wood End Primary School, Wood End
- Woodloes Primary School, Warwick
- Woodside CE Primary School, Grendon
- Wootton Wawen CE Primary School, Wootton Wawen

=== Non-selective secondary schools ===
- Alcester Academy, Alcester
- Ash Green School, Exhall
- Ashlawn School, Rugby (Bi-lateral)
- Avon Valley School, Rugby
- Aylesford School, Warwick
- Bilton School, Rugby
- Campion School, Leamington Spa
- The Coleshill School, Coleshill
- Etone College, Nuneaton
- George Eliot Academy, Nuneaton
- Harris Church of England Academy, Rugby
- Hartshill Academy, Hartshill
- Henley-in-Arden School, Henley-in-Arden
- Higham Lane North Academy, Nuneaton
- Higham Lane School, Nuneaton
- Houlton School, Rugby
- Kenilworth School and Sixth Form, Kenilworth
- Kineton High School, Kineton
- Kingsbury School, Kingsbury
- Myton School, Warwick
- Nicholas Chamberlaine School, Bedworth
- North Leamington School, Leamington Spa
- Nuneaton Academy, Nuneaton
- Oakley School, Bishop's Tachbrook
- The Polesworth School, Polesworth
- The Queen Elizabeth Academy, Atherstone
- Rugby Free Secondary School, Rugby
- St Benedict's Catholic High School, Alcester
- St Thomas More Catholic School, Nuneaton
- Shipston High School, Shipston-on-Stour
- Southam College, Southam
- Stratford-upon-Avon School, Stratford-upon-Avon
- Studley High School, Studley
- Trinity Catholic School, Leamington Spa

=== Grammar schools ===
- Alcester Grammar School, Alcester
- King Edward VI School, Stratford-upon-Avon
- Lawrence Sheriff School, Rugby
- Rugby High School for Girls, Rugby
- Stratford Girls' Grammar School, Stratford-upon-Avon

=== Special and alternative schools ===
- Avon Park School, Rugby
- Brooke School, Rugby
- Corley Academy, Corley*
- Discovery Academy, Nuneaton
- Evergreen School, Warwick
- Exhall Grange School, Exhall
- Oak Wood Primary School, Nuneaton
- Oak Wood Secondary School, Nuneaton
- Quest Academy, Rugby
- Venture Academy, Henley-in-Arden
- Welcombe Hills School, Stratford-upon-Avon
- The Warwickshire Academy, Ash Green
- Woodlands, Coleshill

*This school is located in Warwickshire, but is for pupils from Coventry

=== Further education ===
- King Edward VI College
- North Warwickshire and Hinckley College
- Stratford-upon-Avon College
- Warwickshire College

== Independent schools ==
=== Primary and preparatory schools ===
- Bilton Grange, Dunchurch
- Crackley Hall School, Kenilworth
- Crescent School, Rugby
- The Croft Preparatory School, Stratford-upon-Avon
- Henley-in-Arden Montessori School, Henley-in-Arden
- Stratford Preparatory School, Stratford-upon-Avon
- Warwick Preparatory School, Warwick

=== Senior and all-through schools ===
- Arnold Lodge School, Leamington Spa
- The King's High School for Girls, Warwick
- The Kingsley School, Leamington Spa
- OneSchool Global UK, Atherstone
- Princethorpe College, Princethorpe
- Rugby School, Rugby
- Warwick School, Warwick

=== Special and alternative schools ===
- ALP Nuneaton, Nuneaton
- Arc School Ansley, Ansley
- Arc School Napton, Napton on the Hill
- Arc School Old Arley, Old Arley
- Ashcroft School, Exhall
- Avon Park School, Rugby
- Brickyard Barn Outdoor Learning Centre, Bishop's Tachbrook
- Emscote School, Warwick
- The Haven School, Wolston
- Lake Haven School, Bramcote
- Mill House School, Kingsbury
- Northleigh House School, Hatton
- The Secret Garden, Shustoke
- Starbold Farm Outdoor Learning Centre, Southam
- Values Academy, Nuneaton
- VLC, Leamington Spa
- Wathen Grange School, Mancetter
- Willow Park School, Rugby
