= Accrington Academy =

Location
- Queens Road West; Accrington, Lancashire, BB5 4FF; England; 53.761419°N 2.372472°W

Information
- Type: Academy
- Motto: The Best in Everyone
- Established: 2008
- Founder: United Learning
- Sister school: The Hyndburn Academy and Marsden Heights Community College
- Local authority: Lancashire County Council
- Trust: United Learning Trust
- Specialist: Sports and Mathematics
- Department for Education URN: 135649 Tables
- Ofsted: Reports
- Chair: Peter Mulholland
- Principal: Jamie Peel
- Staff: 160
- Gender: coeducational
- Age: 11 to 16
- Enrolment: 1032
- Language: English
- Houses: Aquila, Delphinus, Draco & Pegasus
- Colour: blue white black
- Slogan: Build character, create learners and transform lives.
- Former name: Moorhead High School & Moorhead Sports College
- Website: accrington-academy.org

Accrington Academy is a mixed 11-16 Academy in Accrington, Lancashire. It has designated specialisms in Sports and Mathematics. It is situated in the centre of Accrington. Accrington St Christopher's C of E High is nearby to the west.

== History ==
The school, run by United Learning, opened on 1 September 2008 on the site of the former Accrington Moorhead Sports College, itself the successor of Moorhead High School which was the successor of the one-time Accrington High School for Girls. All pupils previously at Moorhead automatically transferred to the new school, which had sixth form provision from September 2009 up until July 2024.

=== Former schools ===
Accrington Grammar School had around 500 boys and 100 in the sixth form in the 1970s. Accrington High School for Girls had around 600 girls. Accrington Moorhead High School was on Cromwell Avenue off Queen's Road West. The school was founded in 1895 on Blackburn Road, Accrington, as a 'technical school'. In 1968 it moved to the Moorhead site. In 1975, following the Labour government's educational reforms, it ceased to exist.

In 2008 Nosheen Iqbal wrote in The Guardian that Moorhead High School had been "failing". Her article described a "startling transformation" from 17% of children achieving 5 GCSEs at grades A*-C, to 78% of children doing so in the new school. The school's headteacher believed that the change had been brought about through the Creative Partnerships approach, an Arts Council England programme.

== Notable former pupils ==
=== Accrington Moorhead Sports College ===
Dominic Brunt, actor, known for his part in Emmerdale as Paddy Kirk.

Julie Hesmondhalgh, actress

=== Accrington Grammar School ===
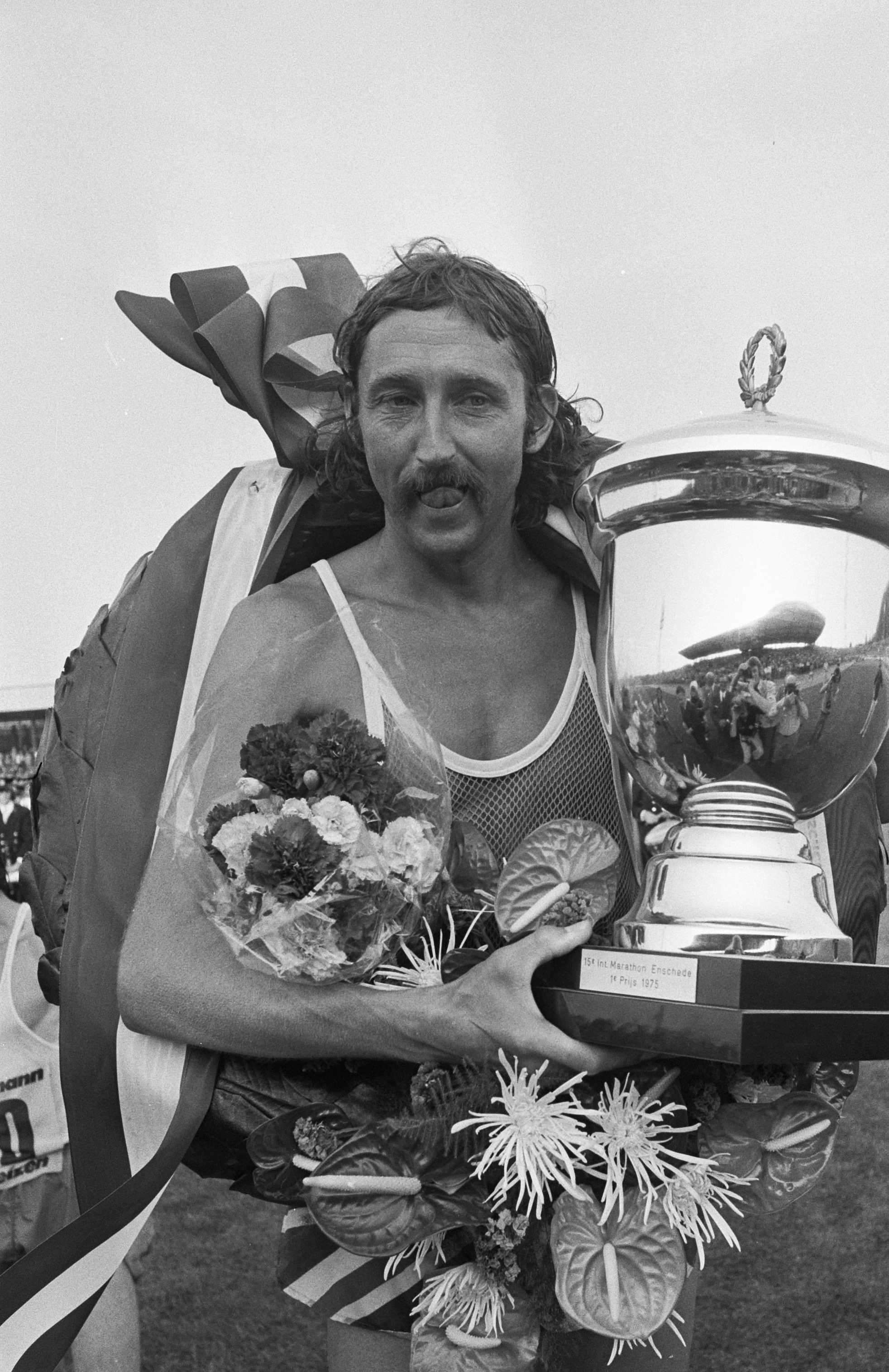
Marathon runner Ron Hill in 1975

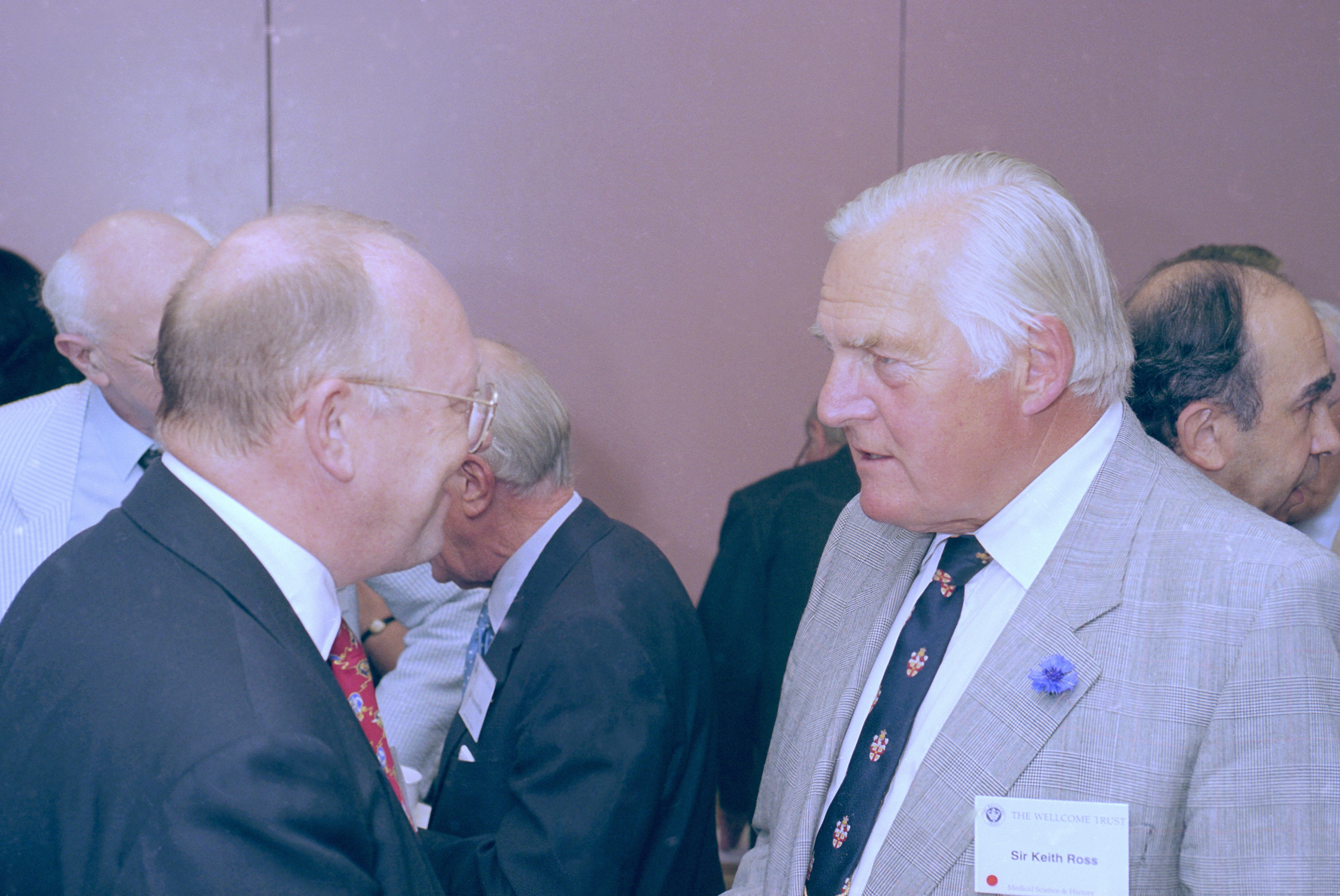
John Wallwork (left), heart surgeon, in June 1997

- Sir Kenneth Barnes CB, Permanent Secretary from 1976 to 1982 of the Department of Employment
- Jim Bowen, comedian, and former host of Bullseye
- Oliver Bulleid CBE, Chief Mechanical Engineer from 1937 to 1948 of the Southern Railway
- Harold Davenport FRS, mathematician
- Sir James Drake CBE, civil engineer, designed the UK's first motorway
- Graeme Fowler, cricketer
- Harry Hill, cyclist who competed in the Olympic Games in 1936
- Ron Hill, marathon runner in the 1964 Tokyo and 1972 Munich Olympics, and won the gold at the 1970 Edinburgh Commonwealth Games
- Prof Leslie Howarth OBE, mathematician
- Prof John Lamb CBE, James Watt Professor of Electrical Engineering from 1961 to 1991 at the University of Glasgow, President from 1970 to 1972 of the British Society of Rheology
- James Arthur Prescott CBE, FRS, agricultural scientist
- Edward Slinger, cricketer, solicitor and judge
- Sir John Tomlinson CBE, opera singer
- Prof John Wallwork CBE FRCS FMedSci, cardiothoracic surgeon and emeritus professor who performed Europe's first successful combined heart-lung transplant in 1984
- Graham Walne, theatre consultant, lighting designer, author, and lecturer
- Harry Yeadon, civil engineer, worked with James Drake on the UK's first motorway

=== Accrington High School for Girls ===
- Gwen Mayor, primary school teacher who was killed in the Dunblane massacre
- Val Robinson OBE, played hockey for Great Britain
- Hazel Townson, children's author
- Jeanette Winterson, CBE, author
