= Oakley Wood (Warwickshire) =

Woodland in Warwickshire, England

- Location within England
- Type: Nature reserve
- Location: Bishop's Tachbrook, Warwickshire, England
- Coordinates: 52°13′51″N 01°33′9″W
- Area: 47 ha (116.14 acres)
- Owner: Warwick District Council
- Operator: Warwickshire Wildlife Trust
- Open: All year

Oakley Wood is a 47 hectare (116 acre) woodland with public access situated south of Leamington Spa in Warwickshire, close to the village of Bishop's Tachbrook. The wood is a Plantation on Ancient Woodland Site (PAWS); that is, a site which has been continuously wooded since at least 1600, but which has more recently had much of the native broad-leaved trees felled and replaced with a commercial conifer crop. Records of the wood date back to 12th century, and it contains a scheduled ancient monument known as Oakley Wood Camp.

The wood was purchased by Warwick District Council in 2008 to allow public access after it was put up for sale by its private owners. The District Council works in partnership with Warwickshire Wildlife Trust and the Friends of Oakley Wood to ensure it is managed sustainably for the benefit of local people and wildlife.

== History ==
Oakley Wood is old. The earliest recorded mention of the wood is in a 12th-century record granting part of the wood of Acle (an old name for Oakley) to an abbey in Worcestershire. There is evidence to suggest that at least part of the wood had already been enclosed by the late 13th century. The substantial woodbank that surrounds the wood has an external ditch typical of an ancient coppice wood. In medieval times wood was a valuable resource, and the woodbanks were in place to indicate ownership and provide protection.

In the 1950s much of the ancient woodland was clear-felled and replaced with a commercial conifer crop, which was never harvested. However, many old and veteran trees remain, especially on the boundary banks and in the southernmost part of the wood.

== Nature ==
Oakley Wood is managed as a nature reserve by Warwickshire Wildlife Trust on behalf of Warwick District Council. A long term management plan is in place to return the wood to a more natural mixed-deciduous environment. Many of the old commercially-planted conifers have been removed and replanting of deciduous trees and shrubs undertaken. The wood has flora typical of ancient woodland, with bluebells, wood anemone and celandine showing during the spring.

The wood is inhabited by roe deer, muntjac and the occasional fallow deer, as well as badgers, foxes and a wide variety of birds. Mike Slater of the Butterfly Conservation wrote in 2014 that "Oakley Wood is an important butterfly site containing 70% of Warwickshire’s butterfly species", including White Admiral and Silver-washed Fritillary. A BioBlitz conducted in 2014 found 221 different species.

== The Earthworks ==
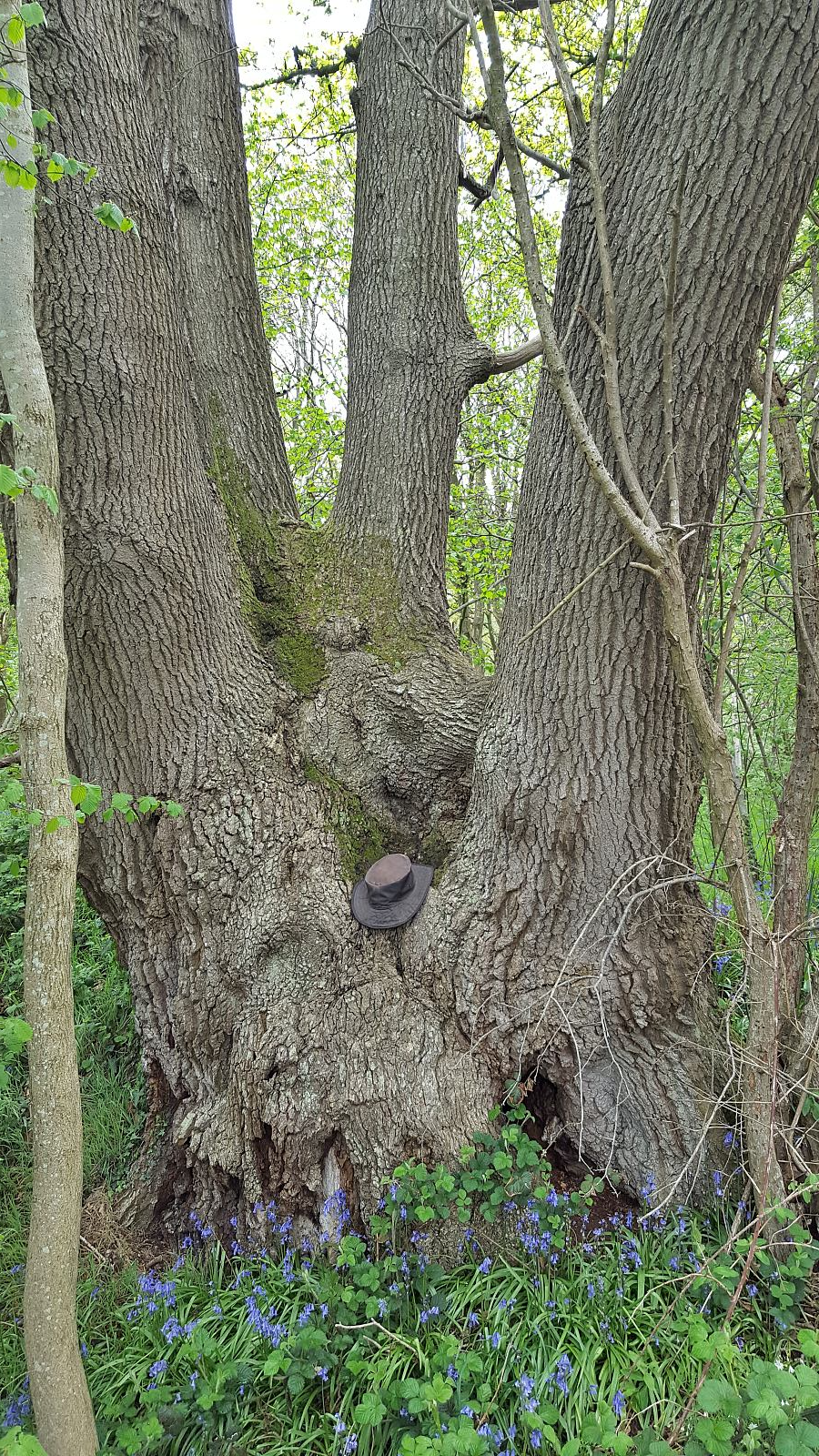
Veteran tree on boundary bank, Oakley Wood

The wood is surrounded by boundary banks, or woodbanks, most substantially in the northern parts. They are typical of medieval wood boundaries, with many veteran trees, mostly coppiced oak, growing on top of the banks. References in historic documents suggest that the banks were created sometime in the 13th century. Lesser earthworks surround much of the rest of the wood to the south, which is believed was a separate wood called Moreton Close at the time of the original enclosure. There is also evidence of more modern earthworks in the form of drainage ditches.

Within the boundary banks are inner earthworks known as Oakley Wood Camp. The boundary banks and the camp earthworks are interconnected.

The camp is a designated Scheduled Monument.

== Oakley Wood Camp ==
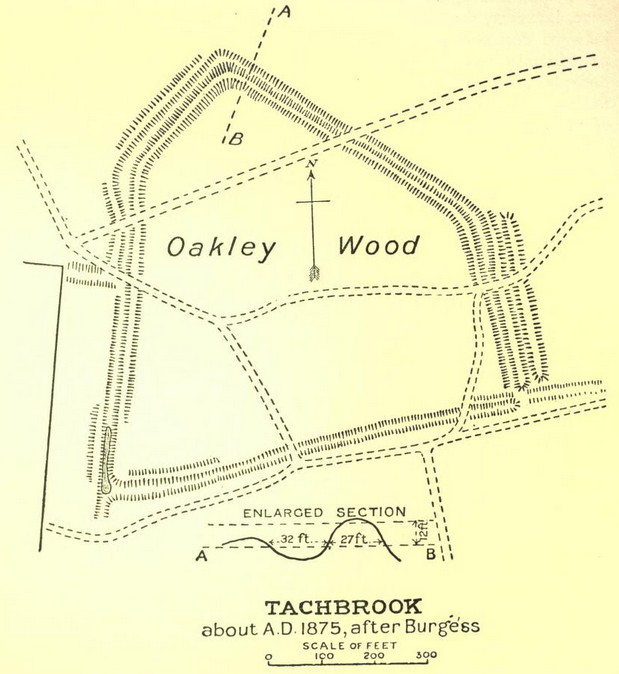
Oakley Wood Camp, c. 1875

The camp is a 3.8 hectare (9.4 acre) area enclosed by earthworks or embankments with ditches, which are generally of an approximate overall height of 2m and overall width of 10m, but can reach 3m and 12m respectively in the most substantial NE section. It is considered to be at least medieval, and possibly much older.

The oldest documented evidence of the camp is in a survey published in a history of Warwickshire in 1904, along with a map described as "about AD 1875, after Burgess" . The survey mentions that local lore held that the camp was Roman but without any evidence to support this.

There are conflicting theories about the origin of the camp.

=== Iron Age fort ===
The 1904 survey of the camp is listed under "Defensive Earthworks", describing it as a stronghold that "more or less resembles some of the works of class B" (a hilltop fortress). Historic England designates it a "slight univallate hillfort", of either Iron Age or Bronze Age origin. Archeological opinion is that the "substantial" nature of the earthworks indicates a defensive purpose, although medieval woodbanks can be equally massive.

At one time the outer earthworks were thought to be outer defences of the hillfort but this idea has been discarded.

=== Medieval Woodland Management ===
In 1986, Richard Hingley, for the Warwickshire Museum, surveyed the site and suggested that the earthworks could be medieval, possibly a woodland management system for enclosure or drainage. The Iron Age theory is called into question by atypical features of the camp compared with those expected of a hillfort: its unusual shape, questionable strategic position and the lack of a defensible entrance.

Oliver Rackham, the noted expert on ancient English woodland, has observed that internal woodbanks can occur in woods where they record the division between two contiguous woods, or subdivisions of the wood between owners over time.

=== Pottery find ===
In 2022 a sherd of pottery was discovered protruding from one of the banks, the only ancient artefact known to have been found on the site. It was initially thought to be medieval, but an archaeological specialist for the Warwick Museum identified it as most likely being from the neck of a Roman amphora. This strengthens the Iron Age fort origin as the Romans were known to repurpose existing fortifications. The sherd is held by the Warwick Museum.

The find is potentially related to other Iron Age/Romano activity which has been found in the nearby Barford area
