= Funnell =

Funnell is an English surname and it may refer to:

- Ben Funnell, New Zealand rugby union player
- Harry Funnell, English cricketer
- Jenny Funnell, English television actress
- Peter Funnell, Curator of Nineteenth-Century Portraits and Head of Research Programmes at the National Portrait Gallery, London.
- Pippa Funnell (born 1968), English equestrian sportswoman, or her husband
- Ray Funnell, Royal Australian Air Force chief
- Robert Funnell, Queensland Legislative Assembly member
- Simon Funnell, English former professional footballer
- Stephen Funnell, Australian former rugby league footballer
- Tony Funnell, English retired professional football forward
- William Funnell (born 1966), English equestrian
- William Funnell (public servant) (1891–1962), Australian public servant
