= United Learning =

Academy trust in the United Kingdom

United Learning is a group of state-funded schools and fee-paying private schools operating in England. United Learning's independent schools are governed by United Church Schools Trust (UCST), and the academies by United Learning Trust (ULT). United Learning Ltd, also a charity, is the ultimate parent company and the owner of the independent schools' land and buildings.

It is one of the largest six charities with the most employees in the UK, with central offices in Peterborough and London. It is governed by a board of trustees and run by an executive team. In 2012, United Learning Trust, which operates academies, and United Church Schools Trust, which operates independent schools, rebranded to operate under one name, United Learning. They legally remain as two separate charities.

== History ==
United Church Schools Trust began life as the Church Schools Company, formed in 1883 by a committee including the Archbishop of Canterbury. The company was formed in response to the lack of academic education available for girls. The first school the company opened was Surbiton High School in 1884. By 1885, the company had 10 schools with 653 pupils between them.

United Learning Trust was formed in 2002 as a subsidiary of the United Church Schools Trust (which comprised independent schools only) in response to the government's invitation to develop new state academies. United Learning Trust's first academy, Manchester Academy, opened in 2003, replacing Ducie High School, a school with a severe truancy problem; the academy received an "outstanding" report from Ofsted in 2009. Inspectors noted: "No matter what their background, all groups of students make outstanding progress as they move through the years."

In 2012, it was agreed that United Church Schools Trust and United Learning Trust should come together under the same branding, 'United Learning', bringing together the state and independent schools represented by the two related charities.

== United Learning Trust ==
United Learning Trust
- Founded: May 15, 2002
- Type: Multi-academy trust
- Registration no.: 04439859
- Purpose: Education
- Location: Worldwide House, Thorpe Wood, Peterborough, PE3 6SB
- Key people: Jon Coles (CEO)
- Website: www.unitedlearning.org.uk

United Learning operated 99 state-funded academy schools as of September 2026. They are free to attend, and accept students of all backgrounds, all faiths and none. The ethos is distinctly Christian and particularly Church of England. United Learning also operates 13 independent schools.

The trust central teams manage much of the bureaucracy in running schools, such as updating statutory policies and running mandatory training. Schools also have access to shared resources for teaching and learning, such as subject advisors and a United Learning curriculum.

Some of United Learning's services for its schools are also made available to schools outside the group. These include teacher training, run by United Teaching; the United Curriculum; training programmes for support staff run by United Apprenticeships; and CPD programmes for middle- and senior-level teaching staff.

== State-funded schools ==
=== Primary schools ===
- Abbey Hey Primary Academy, Gorton, Manchester
- Avonwood Primary School, Gorton, Manchester
- Bank End Primary Academy, Worsbrough, Barnsley
- Beacon View Primary Academy, Paulsgrove, Portsmouth
- Brentnall Academy, Salford
- Cadishead Primary Academy, Cadishead, Manchester
- Corngreaves Academy, Cradley Heath
- Cravenwood Primary Academy, Crumpsall, Manchester
- Dukesgate Academy, Salford
- Fulham Primary School, Fulham, London
- The Galfrid School, Cambridge
- Glebe Primary School, Southwick
- Grange Primary Academy, Kettering
- Ham Dingle Primary Academy, Pedmore, Stourbridge
- Hanwell Fields Community School, Banbury
- High Hazels Academy, Darnall, Sheffield
- Hill View Primary School, Banbury
- Hunningley Primary School, Barnsley
- Langford Primary School, Fulham, London
- Longshaw Primary Academy, Chingford, London
- Marlborough Road Academy, Salford
- Orchard Meadow Primary School, Oxford
- Pegasus Primary School, Oxford
- Salisbury Manor Primary School, Chingford, London
- Silverdale Primary Academy, Newcastle-under-Lyme
- Southway Primary School, Bognor Regis
- Sulivan Primary School, Fulham, London
- Timbertree Academy, Cradley Heath
- The Victory Primary School, Paulsgrove, Portsmouth
- Walthamstow Primary Academy, Walthamstow, London
- Whittingham Primary Academy, Walthamstow, London
- Wilberforce Primary School, City of Westminster, London
- Windale Primary School, Oxford
- Winston Way Academy, Ilford, London

=== Secondary schools ===
- The Albion Academy
- Accrington Academy
- Avonbourne Boys' Academy
- Avonbourne Girls' Academy
- Bacon's College
- Barnsley Academy
- Cambridge Academy for Science and Technology
- Campion School
- Castle View Academy
- Chilmington Green School
- Coleridge Community College
- Conisborough College
- The Cornerstone Academy
- Ernest Bevin Academy
- Fir Vale Academy
- George Eliot Academy
- Gillingham School
- Glenmoor Academy
- Hartshill Academy
- Heath Lane Academy
- Holland Park School
- Huish Episcopi Academy
- The Hurlingham Academy
- The Hyndburn Academy
- Irlam and Cadishead Academy
- The John Roan School
- The Elms Academy
- The Lowry Academy
- Manchester Academy
- Marsden Heights Community College
- Midhurst Rother College
- Montsaye Academy
- Newstead Wood School
- North Oxfordshire Academy
- Northampton Academy
- Nova Hreod Academy
- Nuneaton Academy
- Paddington Academy
- Parkside Community College
- The Regis School
- Regents Park Community College
- Richard Rose Central Academy
- Richard Rose Morton Academy
- Robert Blake School
- Sale High School
- Salford City Academy
- Seahaven Academy
- Sedgehill Academy
- Sheffield Park Academy
- Sheffield Springs Academy
- Shoreham Academy
- Stockport Academy
- The Totteridge Academy
- Trumpington Community College
- Walthamstow Academy
- Winton Academy
- Wye School

=== All-through schools ===
- Goresbrook School
- Kettering Buccleuch Academy
- Swindon Academy
- William Hulme's Grammar School

== United Church Schools Trust ==
Fee paying schools in the associated United Church Schools Trust include:

=== Primary & preparatory schools ===
- Banstead Preparatory School
- Coworth Flexlands School
- Rowan Preparatory School
- St Ives School Haslemere

=== Senior & all-through schools ===
- AKS Lytham
- Ashford School
- Dunottar School
- Embley
- Chafyn-Godolphin School
- Guildford High School
- Lincoln Minster School
- Surbiton High School
- Tranby School
