= Sheffield Springs Academy =

Academy in Sheffield, South Yorkshire, England

Location
- Hurlfield Road; Sheffield, South Yorkshire, S12 2SF; England; 53°21′28″N 1°26′15″W

Information
- Type: Academy
- Established: September 2006
- Local authority: City of Sheffield
- Department for Education URN: 131896 Tables
- Ofsted: Reports
- Head of school: Claire Cartledge
- Gender: Co-educational
- Age: 11 to 16
- Enrolment: 1,100
- Colour: Navy blue
- Public transport: B P Manor Top
- Website: https://www.sheffieldsprings-academy.org/

Sheffield Springs Academy is an 11–16 secondary school serving the Park, Manor and Castle wards of Sheffield, South Yorkshire, England.

The academy is part of United Learning, a national group of schools whose motto is "the best in everyone". It opened in September 2006 on the site of the predecessor school, moving into a £30 million, purpose-built facility in 2008.

Over the past three years, the academy has emerged from an Ofsted category. The most recent Ofsted inspection judged the school as a good provider and agreed that the school has benefited directly from a secure, highly experienced senior leadership team alongside the support of United Learning. As part of this, the school has innovated its curriculum offer, as well as improving areas such as pupils' transition from primary to secondary. For instance, its "Early Risers" initiative, run in conjunction with Sheffield Park Academy, has set a trail for other schools to follow.

== Academic achievements ==
In 2017, Sheffield Springs Academy achieved its best ever GCSE results, with a number of pupils scoring the top grade 9 in English and mathematics. The academy's Progress 8 score was +0.68, placing it in the top 10% nationally. That year was the first that English and mathematics grades were awarded a numeric value, with 9 being the new top grade, representing the best performance.

== Standards ==
Following a visit from Ofsted in October 2016, inspectors noted how "the principal's appointment in January 2016 and the executive headteacher's arrival in April have strengthened leadership. Leaders and governors have left no stone unturned in identifying and then tackling weaknesses. Pupils and most staff welcome the changes and tangible improvements."

The key findings of the inspection report were:

- "Improved teaching and better use of funding for disadvantaged pupils are helping to tackle differences between their rates of progress and those of other pupils effectively."
- "Recent strategies to support pupils who have special educational needs and/or disabilities are hastening their rates of progress well."
- "Leaders are tackling robustly historic negative attitudes of some pupils and families where school is not valued and absence is condoned. Consequently, attendance rates, although below average, are improving rapidly this term."
- "High-quality transition work with primary schools ensures that pupils now settle quickly into school life."
- "Pupils are safe. Partnership working between the school's safeguarding team and the local authority's multi-agency support team (MAST) is strong. This ensures that pupils at risk or facing challenges in their lives are identified and supported as soon as concerns arise and before things can take a turn for the worse."
