= James Drake (engineer) =

British civil engineer

Sir James Drake CBE (27 July 1907 – 1 February 1989) was a British chartered civil engineer who is regarded as the pioneer of the national motorway network in the United Kingdom. As the county surveyor and bridgemaster of Lancashire County Council from 1945 to 1972 he led teams that designed the first stretch of motorway opened to the public, the Preston By-pass (now the M6 from Junctions 29 to 32) on 5 December 1958. There then followed numerous contracts to extend the motorway in the north west of England, which, thanks to his role, probably still has the greatest density of motorways in the country. He was appointed a CBE in 1962 for his services as County Surveyor and Bridgemaster of Lancashire County Council and in 1973 he was knighted in recognition of his role as head of the North West Road Construction Unit and the Lancashire Sub-Unit, organisations that further extended his initial work.

== Early life ==
Drake was born in Burnley, Lancashire, and was educated at Accrington Grammar School and the Victoria University of Manchester where he graduated in 1927 with a BSc in Civil Engineering, with first-class honours. He passed the professional exams of the Institution of Civil Engineers in April 1931, and was accepted as an associate in 1933 and as a full member in 1943. He married Kathleen Shaw in 1937 and they had two daughters.

== Early work ==
His working life was spent in the north west of England, and, but for the first three years of his career when he worked for Stockport County Borough Council (1927–1930), he was based entirely in Lancashire. He spent seven years at Bootle County Borough Council (1930–37) and from there moved to Blackpool County Borough Council (1937–45), initially as Deputy Engineer and Surveyor and latterly as Borough Engineer and Surveyor. In the early part of his career he worked on the design of a wide range of municipal engineering schemes. These included a sports stadium and cycle track; an eighteen-hole golf course; municipal offices; housing estates; libraries; schools; sea defences; an 18-mile sewerage system; a 7-mile ring road; and the construction of Britain's first multi-storey car park with integrated bus station.

In 1937 Drake travelled to Germany with the German Road Delegation to view autobahn construction. In the late 1930s and even during the Second World War many new road schemes were planned for the United Kingdom. The County Surveyors' Society and the Institution of Highway Engineers published reports that outlined the needs for and the benefits of a new high capacity highway network. During the Second World War, Winston Churchill had proposals drawn up to improve transport infrastructure. During this time Drake became a strong advocate of motorways for access, speed, safety and commerce. He went on to pursue his ideas locally, nationally and internationally.

== Birth of the motorway network ==
In 1945 he was appointed the County Surveyor and Bridgemaster of Lancashire County Council, a post he would hold until 1972. Drake published his Road Plan for Lancashire in 1949. Funds for public works were severely limited following the end of the Second World War and so Drake had a number of bridge engineers available, with little design work to occupy them, but with the necessary skills to measure and project traffic flows and manipulate data. This comprehensive document formed the basis of the county's development plan for more than thirty years and went on to become the basis of national highway planning procedures.

Drake realised that following the Second World War there would not be large amounts of public money available for significant new developments. He considered that the only way to develop a strategic road network would be to let a series of contracts, each of which would extend or link up with previously constructed sections and thus lead to the creation of a new road network.

== Preston By-pass ==
From 1946 government plans incorporated a new north-south trunk route through Lancashire. So did Drake's plan, which he pressed on the government from 1949 to 1955. Work began in 1956 on the Preston bypass with the county as the government's agent. This became the first section of Britain's motorway system, opened to traffic in 1958.

Drake and Lancashire County Council had long recognised that a new type of highway was necessary for the mass movement of people and goods on a swift and safe basis. However

Drake believed that the projected traffic figures for the by-pass justified the construction of three lanes in each direction. However, despite his requests for additional funding, the Ministry of Transport insisted that this could not be justified. Drake's response to this was to indeed create a motorway with two lanes in each direction, but with an extra-wide central reservation. Bridges over the by-pass were built with sufficient clearance and headroom to accept dual three lanes in each direction without modification. This meant that when the inevitable widening took place it did so relatively easily.

Drake realised that motorways would have a significant impact on the communities that they passed through and tried to ensure that their impact was minimised.

The scheme design and supervision was carried out by the County Surveyor's Department of Lancashire County Council, as agent for the Ministry of Transport. The contractor was Tarmac Ltd who carried out the roadworks, they engaged Leonard Fairclough Ltd as a sub-contractor for the majority of the bridgeworks. The two multi-span steel bridges, Samlesbury Bridge and Higher Walton Bridge were built under separate contracts by Cleveland Bridge and Engineering Company Ltd and Dorman Long (Bridge and Engineering) Ltd respectively.

The scheme was opened by the Prime Minister, Harold Macmillan on 5 December 1958. It was the first length of motorway opened to the public in the United Kingdom, with no speed limit and the largest road signs in Europe.

== Motorway expansion ==
Even as Preston By-pass was being opened Drake had Lancaster By-pass under construction and numerous other schemes at outline design or detail design stages.

== Commemorative plaque ==
On 5 December 2008 Lancashire County Council, the Institution of Civil Engineers and the then Institution of Highways and Transportation arranged for the unveiling of a plaque to commemorate Drake's role in the development of the motorway network. The event was held on the 50th anniversary of the opening of Preston By-pass, adjacent to the spot where the Prime Minister, Harold Macmillan had opened the first section of motorway. The plaque is sited at the back of the footway/cycleway adjacent to the A59 at M6 Junction 31. It is immediately to the west of Samlesbury Bridge, which takes the M6 over the River Ribble, at this location.

At 12.00 Councillor Alan Whittaker, the Chairman of Lancashire County Council, and Lord Adonis, Secretary of State at the Department of Transport, each made a short speech before unveiling the plaque, along with Sir James Drake's daughters, Diana and Jane, and Harry Yeadon. Harry Yeadon had worked on both the design and supervision of the by-pass scheme and in 1974 succeeded to the post of Lancashire's County Surveyor and Bridgemaster.

== Publications, honours and awards ==
1949 – Drake publishes his Road Plan for Lancashire.

1953 – Drake hosts the British Road Federation conference on 'Lancashire's Roads'.

1959 to 1960 – Drake is President of the Institution of Highway Engineers, now the Chartered Institution of Highways and Transportation.

1962 – Drake is appointed a CBE for his services as County Surveyor and Bridgemaster of Lancashire County Council.

1964 to 1965 – Drake is President of the County Surveyors' Society.

1969 – 'Motorways' published, Drake wrote this along with Harry Yeadon and Di Evans.

1972 – Drake is awarded Honorary Fellowship of Manchester Polytechnic.

1972 to 1975 – Drake is a Member of the Institution of Civil Engineers Council.

1973 – Drake is awarded an Honorary Doctor of Science degree by the University of Salford.

1973 – Drake is knighted in recognition of his role as head of the North West Road Construction Unit and the Lancashire Sub-Unit.

== See also ==
- List of motorways in the United Kingdom
