= Parkside Community College =

Location
- Parkside; Cambridge, Cambridgeshire, CB1 1EH; England
- Coordinates: 52°12′16″N 0°07′43″E

Information
- Type: Academy
- Established: 1913; 113 years ago
- Specialist: Media Arts College
- Department for Education URN: 136636 Tables
- Ofsted: Reports
- Chair: Mark Carrington
- Head teacher: Dee Wallace
- Gender: Coeducational
- Age: 11 to 19
- Enrollment: 700
- Trust: Cambridge Academic Partnership
- Website: parkside.education

Parkside Community College is a secondary academy school with 600 places for children aged 11–16, situated in Cambridge, Cambridgeshire. It is part of the United Learning Cambridge Cluster, along with Parkside Sixth, Coleridge Community College, Trumpington Community College, and Cambridge Academy for Science and Technology (formerly UTC Cambridge). Cambridge Academic Partnership joined the United Learning group of academies as a unit in September 2019. It is located next to the main Cambridge Parkside Police Station, the main Cambridge Fire Station and the National Express coach stops. It is east of Emmanuel College, Cambridge.

From 1960 to 1974 it was the Cambridge Grammar School for Girls, after which it became the co-educational comprehensive Parkside Community College. It was the first school in the UK to be designated a Media Arts College under the UK government's specialist schools programme, in 1997, and was granted Foundation status in 2003.

In 2005 Parkside Community College formed the Parkside Federation with Coleridge Community College, which had then been placed in special measures. The school achieved Academy status in 2011 when the federation converted to a multi-academy trust. At the same time it opened a new sixth-form college, Parkside Sixth, which closed in 2025. In 2017 the trust changed its name to the Cambridge Academic Partnership. The Cambridge Academic Partnership would later go on to change its name to the United Learning Cambridge Cluster.

The history of the school is related in An Epoch-Making School, by former Deputy Principal Rosemary Gardiner (1983).

== Research work ==
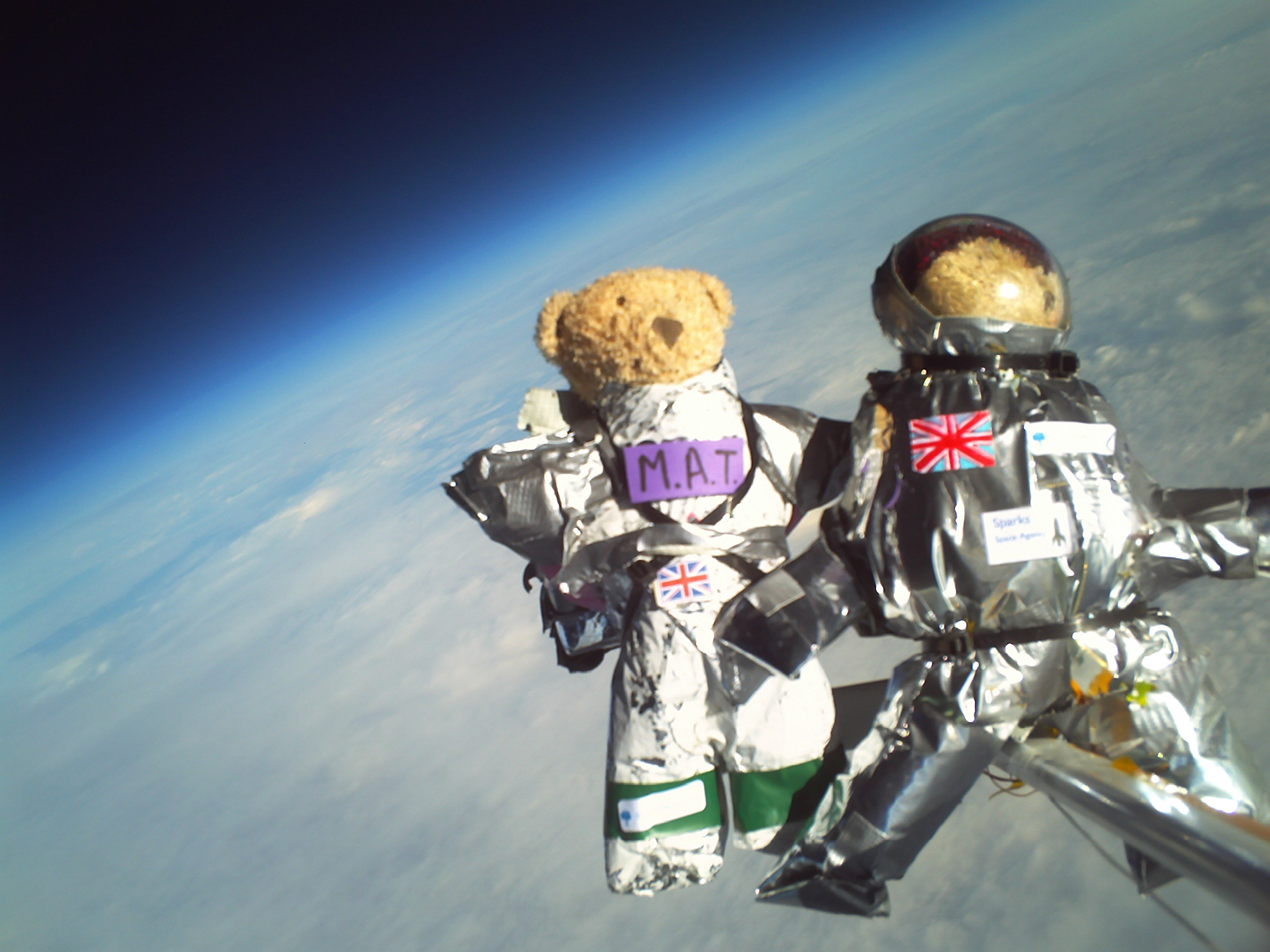
Teddies in Space – taken in near space at 30,000m (19 miles – the edge of space is 66 miles): a project with Cambridge University Spaceflight

Its work as a specialist media arts college has been documented in a number of research studies by staff at the school. These include studies of an extensive primary school animation project (e.g. Burn and Parker, 2001), run in conjunction with the Cambridge Film Consortium, a group composed of Anglia Ruskin University, City Screen (an Arts cinema chain), the Cambridge Film Festival, and Parkside itself.

A comprehensive account of the school's media work, giving examples of work in digital video, computer games, animation, and television drama, as well as work across the curriculum, is provided in Andrew Burn and James Durran's Media Literacy in Schools (2007).

On 1 December 2008, the Nova 9 helium balloon took two space-suited teddies close to the edge of space from the grounds of Churchill College, Cambridge. The space suits were designed by 11- to 13-year-olds at the school. The journey took just over two hours. The teddies descended back to Earth and landed near Ipswich, being located by GPS equipment.

== Academic performance ==
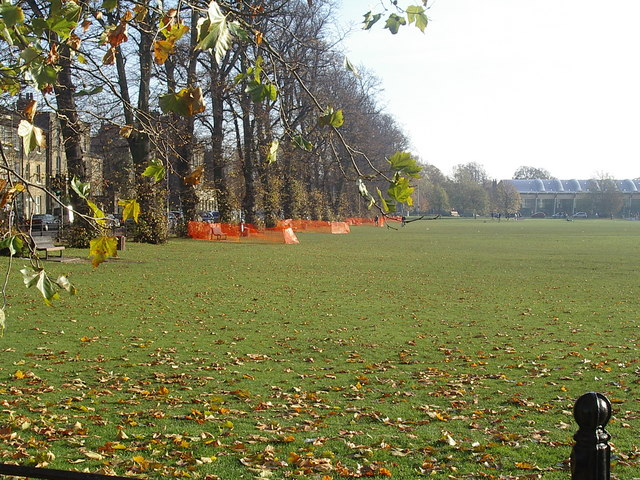
Parkside looking towards the swimming pool - geograph.org.uk

Parkside Community College achieves GCSE results that are consistently among the best for state schools in Cambridgeshire.

== Notable alumni ==
- Cavetown, musician and YouTuber
- Patrick O'Flynn, UK Independence Party MEP
- Ben Thapa, opera singer
- Ronald Searle, Cartoonist
- Isamaya Ffrench, Make-up artist

The author Nick Hornby was an English teacher at the school between 1982 and 1984.

The UCL English professor and media theorist Andrew Burn (professor) taught English, Media and Drama at the school from 1986 to 2001.
