= Cambridge Academy for Science and Technology =

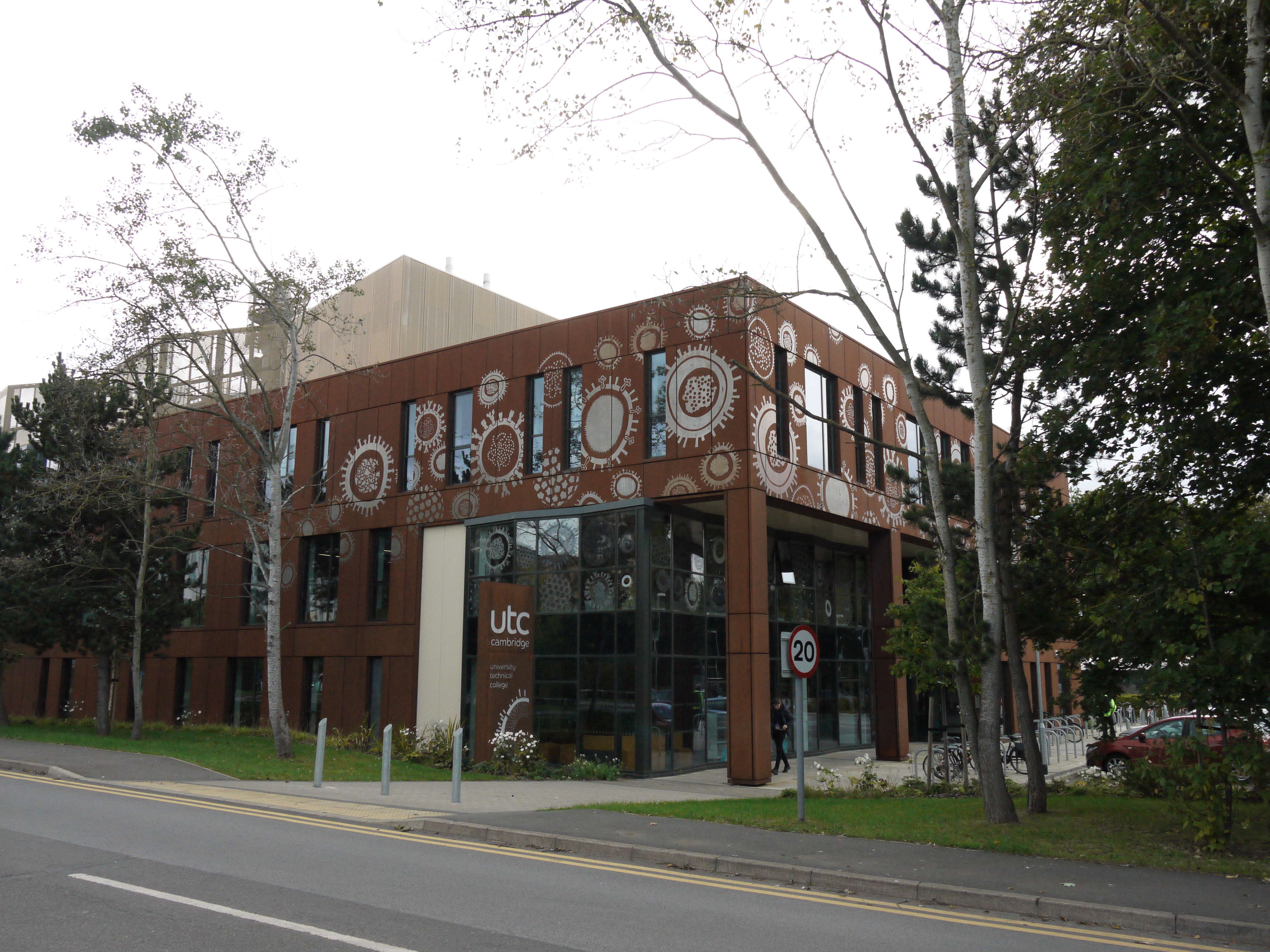
- Main academy building

Location
- Robinson Way; Cambridge, Cambridgeshire, CB2 0SZ; England; 52.17479°N 0.14041°E

Information
- Type: University technical college
- Established: 8 September 2014; 11 years ago
- Department for Education URN: 140265 Tables
- Ofsted: Reports
- Chair: Tim Thornton
- Head: Danielle Pacey
- Staff: 40
- Gender: Coeducational
- Age: 13 to 19
- Enrolment: 430
- Capacity: 670
- Website: cambridgeast.org.uk

Cambridge Academy for Science and Technology (formerly UTC Cambridge) is a university technical college opened in 2014. It is located on the Biomedical Campus, which encompasses Addenbrooke's Hospital, next to the Long Road Sixth Form College in Cambridge. The school is a member of the United Learning Cambridge Cluster (formerly the Parkside Federation and the Cambridge Academic Partnership) along with Parkside Community College, Coleridge Community College, Trumpington Community College, and Parkside Sixth.

The formal ceremony to celebrate the change of name and to mark the school becoming a member of the Parkside Federation took place at the school premises on 19 September 2017. In September 2019, the Cambridge Academic Partnership joined the United Learning group of schools as a unit.

Its sponsors include Cambridge Regional College, Cambridge University Health Partners and the Sanger Institute.

Students at Cambridge Academy for Science and Technology engage in Challenge Projects (held by regional employers such as AstraZeneca and Zeiss) between 10 and 20 hours per week for six to eight weeks. Challenge Projects are cross curricular in nature and engender innovation and enterprise while upskilling students in the latest scientific and computer technology.

Students generate a portfolio of evidence of their developing professional, technical and employ ability skills that leads to evaluation by external moderators of the Baker Award.
