= Manchester Youth Theatre =

The Manchester Youth Theatre was a youth theatre which operated in Manchester from 1966 until 2003. It was founded by Geoff Sykes, a lifelong friend of Michael Croft founder of The National Youth Theatre who served as its Artistic Director until his death. Sykes and his wife Hazel ran Manchester Youth Theatre staging plays, musicals and devised shows which featured at the local theatres in Manchester.

Mike Leigh, then a lecturer at the Catholic women teachers training college Sedgley Park, devised and directed two big-cast projects for the Manchester Youth Theatre: Big Basil and Glum Victoria and the Lad with Specs .

Sam Boardman-Jacobs won acclaim for his work on Holocaust and Yiddish drama with the Manchester Youth Theatre.

== Alumni ==
Various alumni include Dominic Monaghan; Aiden Shaw; Steven Pinder; Kevin Williams; David Threlfall; Lee Oakes; Phil Bailey; David Bamber; Gillian Bevan; Lesley Sharp; Alan Williams; Timothy Walker; Graham Fellows; also Tom/Thomas Coulthard; Karl Heaver; Shaun Gorringe; and Bernard Latham. Alumni from the 1990s include actors Greg Haiste; Kenny Doughty; Chris Bisson; Annabelle Dowler; directors Robert Wolstenholme, Lisa May, Mark Powell, writers Sarah Grochala; Simon Bestwick; and international choreographer J*Rolzz (Jennie Rowlandson).
