= Walthamstow Academy =

Location
- Billet Road; London, E17 5DP
- Coordinates: 51.5995°N 0.02435°W

Information
- Type: Academy
- Department for Education URN: 132727 Tables
- Ofsted: Reports
- Gender: Coeducational
- Age: 11 to 18
- Website: http://www.walthamstow-academy.org

Walthamstow Academy is a mixed secondary school and sixth form located in Walthamstow, London. Since September 2019, the school has been sponsored by United Learning.

Walthamstow Academy also has a Sixth Form which opened in 2008
