= Sam Boardman-Jacobs =

Welsh playwright (1942–2022)

Sam Boardman-Jacobs (1942 – January 2022) was a Yorkshire-born playwright, director, and scenographer who was raised in the Midlands and London. After living in Glamorgan, Wales for 25 years, he later resided in France and Spain. He also received a master's degree from Trinity Laban, and became a choreographer. Prior to his death, he commuted between France, Spain, and the UK.

== Biography ==
Boardman-Jacobs, a former Reader in Theatre and Media Drama at the University of Glamorgan, is known for his research in Holocaust drama, Yiddish theatre, gay and lesbian theatre, Spanish playwright Federico García Lorca, and the Spanish Civil War, which are all reflected in his plays. His work with Manchester Youth Theatre on Holocaust and Yiddish drama earned him acclaim, and in 2002, he received a grant from the European Association of Jewish Culture for his play Trying To Be, which explores Jewish identity in contemporary Britain.

After completing an MA in Choreography at Laban in London, Boardman-Jacobs became the artistic director of Found Reality Dance Theatre in Cardiff, where he created choreographic dance theatre. His stage play Play Federico For Me tells the fictional story of Catalan actress Margarita Xirgu, who relies on the ghost of Federico García Lorca during her exile after the Spanish Civil War to help her in her political-artistic battle with Eva Perón over the first performance of Lorca's The House of Bernarda Alba. He also translated and adapted Lorca's El público, which was produced by the Found Reality Theatre Company in 2005. His 2007 radio play, The Sixth Column Has Better Legs, portrays the experiences of four chorus girls in Madrid during the city's siege.

Boardman-Jacobs' Passion for the Impossible tells the story of Violette Leduc and Jean Genet in wartime Paris, while Red Hot and Blue depicts singer Libby Holman's reflection on her life, including a murder trial, an affair with Montgomery Clift, and early Civil Rights campaigning during World War II, on the night before her suicide.

In 2003, Boardman-Jacobs taught at the Lemonia Disabled Writers' Residential Course, a project organized by Graeae Theatre Company, Writernet, and Tŷ Newydd. His 2004 play, Embracing Barbarians, based on the political and sexual fantasies of dying Greek poet Constantine Cavafy, featured a deaf performer in the role of a hearing character in an effort to make the piece accessible to both deaf and hearing performers and audiences.

Boardman-Jacobs taught Writing Mentoring and Dramaturgy courses at various venues, including The Soho Theatre, The Actor's Centre in London, the Arvon Foundation, and Ty Newydd in North Wales, as well as on MA in Scriptwriting courses in Cardiff and Exeter. In France and the UK, he taught Master classes in Scriptwriting and Dramaturgy. He was also a scriptwriter for 12 years on BBC Radio 4's The Archers and a writer for Channel 4's Brookside. Additionally, he translated from Spanish to English.

== Stage plays ==
- Someone Else’s Rainbow, 1979
- Setting Out For Ithaca 1980
- Farblas! 1996
- Play Federico For Me, 1998
- Passion for the Impossible, 1999
- Asylum, 2001
- Trying To Be, 2002
- Why Is This Night?, 2003
- Embracing Barbarians, 2004
- The Public 2005 (English translation from Lorca's El Público)
- Red Hot & Blue 2007

== Radio plays ==
- Her Name Was Milena 1982
- Last Friday in Jerusalem 1984
- Fanny Rosen's Bad Debt 1985
- After Every Dream 1988
- Facing the Sun 1986
- After Every Dream 1988
- Doesn't Everyone Live in a Ballroom? 1991
- Hangover Square (dramatised from Patrick Hamilton's novel) 1994
- The Abduction of Esther Lyons, 1999
- One Pair of Hands, (5 Part Series) 2001 (adaptation of the novel by Monica Dickens)
- The Sixth Column Has Better Legs (5-part series) 2007

== Dance theatre productions ==
With Found Reality Dance Theatre:

- Soft Murders (three dance theatre pieces based on the paintings of three gay artists: Gilbert & George, Andy Warhol, Francis Bacon. Chapter Arts Theatre; Atrium Theatre Cardiff; Cardiff and Edinburgh Fringe Festivals.
- "Cabaret of Pain" Work in progress created to explore the Taboo of Pain in Performance. Shown as a Conference Intervention at ATRIUM Theatre Cardiff as part of the TAPRA Drama conference.
- "The Mayakovsky Project" Based on the performance practices of Meyerhold and an intended as a showcase training manual by Found Reality Theatre for teachers of physical performance practice."Each One Teach One-Training Trainers to Train Practitioners to Train performance practitioners
- "Street of Crocodiles" an Homage to Tadeusz Kantor- Found Reality Theatre Co in Collaboration with University of Glamorgan Theatre Department.
- "Black and Blue" -A body in pain is a city under siege Chapter Arts Center Cardiff.
- "Occupied Women" Women fashion and Collaboration in Occupied France in 1944 Théâtre du petit chapiteau, St Jean D'Angely France.
