= Graham Walne =

British theatre consultant

Graham Walne is a prolific British-born theatre consultant, lighting designer, author, and lecturer who has worked in Europe, the US and Australia, where he has lived since 1998.

== Early life ==
Walne was born in Lancashire UK in 1947. His love of theatre was stimulated at an early age by attendances at Blackpool's ornate Victorian Tower Circus. He attended Accrington Grammar School where his aim to become a stage designer was indulged in his own scene workshop. During this time his large-scale models of the London Palladium Theatre came to the attention of the theatre management which encouraged him to attend the Royal Academy of Dramatic Art to be trained as a stage manager by Dorothy Tenham. He graduated in 1967.

== Career ==
The Palladium employed him as an electrician. Walne worked on major productions that were televised live on The London Palladium Show, a successor to Sunday Night At The London Palladium.

Walne was employed as Assistant Technical Supervisor by international lighting manufacturer Rank Strand (1970–1974), before becoming Sales Manager to Theatre Projects Services (1974). Walne had been undertaking free-lance work during these years as a lighting designer and he went fully freelance in 1975. He was the project leader, or a leading partner, in over 100 theatre consultancy projects of all types and scales, including 40 in Western Australia. Notable projects include:

- London, Shakespeare Globe (as associate to Michael Holden)
- London, Royal Academy of Music Theatre
- Crawley UK, Hawth Theatre
- Guernsey UK, Beau Sejour redevelopment

Western Australia:

- State Theatre Centre
- Perth Town Hall and Subiaco Arts Centre refurbishments
- Hale School and All Saints College new theatres
- Albany Entertainment Centre

He has designed the lighting for over 500 productions worldwide, notable work includes:

- 25 grand operas for the Opera Company of Boston USA
- 13 ballets in repertoire for the Bolshoi Ballet at London's Royal Albert Hall
- Cabaret at London's Dorchester Hotel Park Lane and the Café Royal Regent Street
- Premiere of ‘The Balcony’ opera, Bolshoi Theatre Moscow (then USSR)
- Numerous UK tours, pantomimes and London West End seasons
- Fringe productions at the Edinburgh Festival.
- 3 productions for the Perth International Arts Festival Western Australia
- 35 productions for three companies in Perth Western Australia since 1999
- Opening Gala State Theatre Centre of Western Australia.

== Publications ==
Walne wrote over 100 articles for theatre technical publications in the US, Europe and Australia along with multiple books:

- Oxford Companion to the Theatre, co-author, (first ever sound section) 1983
- Sound for Theatres, 1981
- Sound for the Theatre, 1990
- Safety in Live Performance (Training section) 1993
- Recent Safety Legislation (co-author) 1994
- Effects for the Theatre (editor and co-author) 1995
- Projection for the Performing Arts, 1995
- On Being A Lighting Designer, 2019

== Other achievements ==
In 1987 he co-founded and chaired for ten years the Arts and Entertainment Technical Training Initiative (AETTI), the first body in the UK to deliver National Vocational Qualifications (NVQs) for backstage personnel. The later AETTI restructured and delivered the first BTEC qualifications for stage technicians.

He has given masterclasses on lighting and sound in Europe, the US and Australia where he lectures at the Western Australian Academy of Performing Arts (WAAPA). Additionally he wrote and presented what was considered (1991) the first video on stage lighting. He was made a Fellow of the Gordon Reid Foundation (Western Australia) in 1997. In 1999 Walne brought together five other theatre consultants working in Western Australia and together they founded the Institute of Independent Arts Consultants (WA), he was appointed the institute's first chairman.

He is a member of the Association of Lighting Designers, and of the Association of British Theatre Technicians.
