= Coleridge Community College =

Location
- Radegund Road; Cambridge, Cambridgeshire, CB1 3RJ; England
- 52.194°N 0.153°E

Information
- Type: Academy
- Religious affiliation: None
- Local authority: Cambridgeshire
- Department for Education URN: 136650 Tables
- Ofsted: Reports
- Chair: Victoria Espley
- Principal: Matt Oughton
- Gender: Coeducational
- Age: 11 to 16
- Houses: Davies, Clarke, Attenborough & Taylor
- Colours: Red, Purple, Green & Yellow
- Website: www.coleridgecc.org.uk

Coleridge Community College is a secondary academy school with 750 places for children aged 11–16, situated on Radegund Road, Cambridge, Cambridgeshire, England. The school is a member of the United Learning Cambridge Cluster (formerly the Parkside Federation and the Cambridge Academic Partnership) along with Parkside Community College, Trumpington Community College, Cambridge Academy for Science and Technology (formerly UTC Cambridge), and Parkside Sixth. It joined Parkside Community College to form the Parkside Federation in 2005, after having been placed in special measures in 2003. An Ofsted report in 2019 rated it as good, under the leadership of headteacher Mark Patterson. Cambridge Academic Partnership joined the United Learning academy as a unit in September 2019. This rating was confirmed by Ofsted in a monitoring visit in December 2024. In August 2026, under the leadership of Matt Oughton, Coleridge achieved their best ever set of GCSE outcomes which saw them as the 4th most improved school in England for Attainment 8 and the most improved school for Pupil Premium outcomes.

Originally two segregated schools, the Coleridge Secondary Modern School for Boys was located in the right half and the Coleridge Secondary Modern School for Girls in the left half of the mirror-image twin main building, with a separate dedicated gymnasium located behind the Girls' school, and prefabricated classroom outbuildings surrounding its internal playing fields at the rear of the Boys' school. The two schools were merged into a comprehensive school from the 1966 school year as part of the national reorganisation of secondary and grammar schools.

== Criticism of behaviour policy ==
In December 2021 a student-made petition on Change.org said that the school had transformed from a "safe haven" to a "negative environment which resembles a prison", asking for these "derogatory rules to be demonised". A parent was interviewed in the local news and described the school as a "camp" because children were given report cards. A former student was interviewed and said "You always felt like you were doing something wrong". Daniel Zeichner, the Labour Party UK MP for Cambridge, said "I found some of the attitudes of the trust hard to take. It was very much 'this is United Learning’s approach and that's the way it is'". A United Learning spokesperson for the college said that the behaviour policy had been 'successfully put in place' but that local parents are 'entitled to complain'.

== Notable alumni ==
- Louis Rolfe, British Paralympic track cyclist
- Michael Heaver, Brexit Party MEP
- Leon Davies, Cambridge United Football Club defender
- Catherine Banner, writer
- Lucy Parker, footballer

== Notable staff ==
- Ted Hughes, poet and writer, worked at Coleridge
