= Shoreham Academy =

Location
- Kingston Lane; Shoreham-by-Sea, West Sussex, BN43 6YT; England; 50°50′13″N 0°14′44″W

Information
- Type: Academy
- Motto: The best in everyone™ - United Learning
- Established: 2009
- Founder: United Learning
- School district: Adur and Worthing County Council
- Local authority: West Sussex
- Authority: West Sussex County Council
- Trust: United Learning
- Department for Education URN: 135962 Tables
- Ofsted: Reports
- Principal: Jim Coupe
- Staff: 200
- Years taught: Year 7, Year 8, Year 9, Year 10, Year 11, Year 12 (Sixth Form), Year 13 (Sixth Form)
- Gender: Co-educational
- Age: 11 to 18
- Enrolment: 1,800
- Houses: Sapphire, Gold, Emerald
- Colours: Blue, Green, Yellow, Navy

Shoreham Academy is a co-educational secondary school and sixth form located in Shoreham-by-Sea, West Sussex, England which opened in September 2009. The academy replaced Kings Manor Community College, which closed in August 2009.

The school was judged Outstanding by Ofsted in 2012 and 2024.
