= St Thomas More Catholic School, Nuneaton =

St Thomas More Catholic School and Sixth Form College
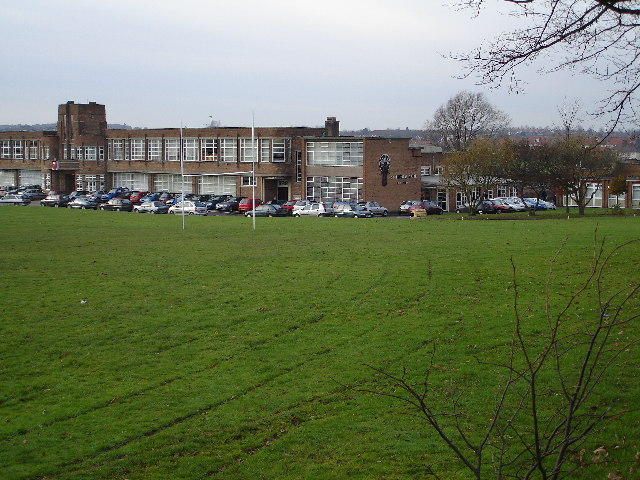

Location
- Greenmoor Road; Nuneaton, Warwickshire, CV10 7EX; England
- Coordinates: 52.5169°N 1.4808°W

Information
- Type: Academy
- Religious affiliation: Roman Catholic
- Local authority: Warwickshire County Council
- Department for Education URN: 141836 Tables
- Ofsted: Reports
- Principal: Leearna Thomas
- Staff: 117
- Gender: Coeducational
- Age: 11 to 18
- Enrolment: 911 approx
- Houses: Arrowsmith, Clitherow, Kirby, Sherwin, Webster and Gennings
- Colours: Maroon and Gold (Sixth Form colours are Royal Blue and Gold)
- Website: http://www.st-thomas-more.net/

St Thomas More Catholic School and Sixth Form College (formerly St Thomas More Catholic School and Technology College) is a mixed Roman Catholic secondary school located on Greenmoor Road, Nuneaton, Warwickshire, England. It is listed as a specialist Technology school by Ofsted, which requires the school to offer GCSEs in Technology to all students. The principal is Mrs Leearna Thomas who has been in the position since the beginning of 2018 after taking over from Mr Francis Hickey. As of September 2012, the educational establishment has been rated as 'good' ' by Ofsted, who previously gave it an 'outstanding'.

== History ==
The school was opened as the Arbury Senior Council School on Thursday 18 May 1938. Designed by local architect H. N. Jepson, the school was expected to accommodate 800 students in separate boys and girls departments. Construction on the 13-acre site began in October 1937, with the main block opening as a mixed school with an initial capacity of 400 students. The school and playing fields occupied land originally purchased by the council in the 1930s from the FitzRoy Newdegate family.

Mr Alan Grain was appointed the first headmaster of the newly opened school. With the introduction of the Tripartite System, the school became the Arbury County Secondary Modern.

In the 1970s, schools in Nuneaton were reorganised by the local authority as part of the nationwide introduction of the comprehensive system. Arbury was merged with George Eliot County High to form a new enlarged school on the George Eliot site. This new comprehensive also absorbed the nearby sites of Caldwell County Junior School and St. Joseph's R.C High School. Forced to vacate their site, St. Joseph's R.C High School opened in 1974 as the voluntary aided St.Thomas More Catholic School on the former Arbury site along Greenmoor Road. The idea of Arbury and St. Joseph's 'swapping' sites was suggested as early as 1969 by the local authority as it planned for the upcoming move to comprehensive education.

== Academy status ==
In March 2015, the school, together with its feeder schools, completed its conversion into an academy. Whilst retaining its previous name, the school is now a part of the Holy Spirit Catholic Multi-Academy. Its fellow members are:

- Our Lady and St Joseph Catholic Academy, Nuneaton.
- St. Anne's Catholic Academy, Nuneaton.
- St. Francis Catholic Academy, Bedworth.
- St. Benedict's Catholic Academy, Atherstone.

== Sixth Form ==
St Thomas More Sixth Form was established in September 2011 with the current director of the Sixth Form being Phil Gray. The current requirements for admission to the sixth form is 5 GCSEs 9-4 with at least a 4 in both Maths and English. Currently only AS and A2 levels are taught at the sixth form as the main education; as well as an additional ASDAN course.
