= Glenmoor Academy =

Location
- Beswick Avenue; Ensbury Park; Bournemouth, Dorset, BH10 4EX; England
- Coordinates: 50.7476°N 1.88911°W

Information
- Type: Academy
- Established: 1877
- Local authority: Bournemouth, Christchurch and Poole
- Trust: United Learning
- Department for Education URN: 140008 Tables
- Ofsted: Reports
- Gender: Girls
- Age: 11 to 16
- Website: http://www.glenmoor.org.uk/

Glenmoor Academy is a secondary school for girls located in the Ensbury Park area of Bournemouth in the English county of Dorset.

The school was first established in 1877 as Winton British School, educating boys and girls up to age of 13. In 1911 the school relocated to a site on Coronation Avenue which was split into Winton School (boys) and Moordown School (girls). Following a major reorganisation of schools in the area in 1957, The secondary section of Moordown School relocated to the current site on Beswick Avenue and was renamed Glenmoor School. In 1995 Winton School relocated to a site on next door to Glenmoor School on Winton Way. Winton School is now known as Winton Academy.

Previously administered by Bournemouth Borough Council, Glenmoor School converted to academy status on 1 September 2013 and was renamed Glenmoor Academy. The school is now part of the United Learning trust which also includes Winton Academy.
