= Trumpington Community College =

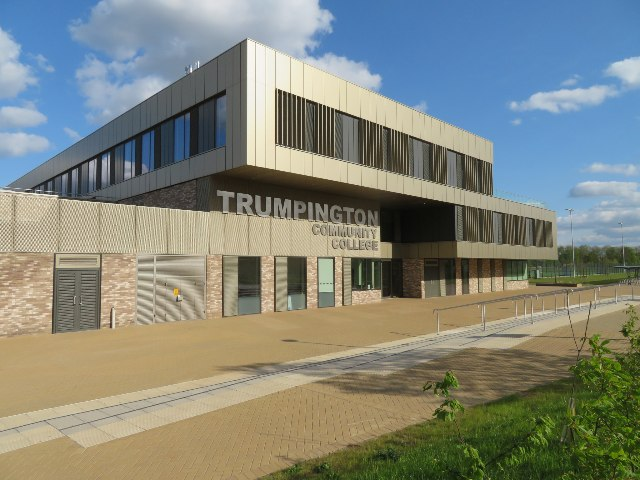

Location
- Lime Avenue; Trumpington; Cambridge, Cambridgeshire, CB2 9FD; England
- 52.1763°N 0.1235°E

Information
- Type: Academy
- Established: 2015
- Local authority: Cambridgeshire County Council
- Trust: United Learning
- Department for Education URN: 145034 Tables
- Ofsted: Reports
- Executive Principal: Matt Oughton
- Gender: Co-educational
- Age: 11 to 16
- Website: www.trumpingtoncc.org.uk

Trumpington Community College is a co-educational secondary school located in the Trumpington area of Cambridge in the English county of Cambridgeshire. The school is named after the village of Trumpington which is located nearby.

The school was constructed to serve the southern fringe expansion of Cambridge, and opened in September 2015. The school building was designed by Avanti Architects, and was awarded a commendation at the 2017 Civic Trust Awards.

In September 2019, Trumpington Community College became an academy sponsored by United Learning. It forms part of the United Learning Cambridge Cluster along with Cambridge Academy for Science and Technology, Coleridge Community College and Parkside Community College. Trumpington Community College offers GCSEs and BTECs as programmes of study for pupils.

In August 2023, under the leadership of Matt Oughton, Trumpington achieved their best ever set of GCSE results which placed them a third in Cambridgeshire for Attainment 8 and in the top 200 schools nationally. This success was reinforced in November 2023 when Ofsted rated the school as "Good" with "Outstanding" Leadership and Management.
