= Winton Academy =

- School badge

Location
- Winton Way; Bournemouth, Dorset, BH10 4HT; England; 50.747°N 1.891°W

Information
- Type: 11–16 boys Academy
- Motto: High Achievement - High Standards
- Established: 1877
- Local authority: Bournemouth, Christchurch and Poole
- Trust: United Learning
- Department for Education URN: 140007 Tables
- Ofsted: Reports
- Principal: Leon Lima
- Gender: Boys
- Age: 11 to 16
- Enrolment: 774 boys (2018)
- Houses: Shelley, Simmons, Turing, Attenborough, King
- Colour
- Website: Winton Academy

Winton Academy is an 11-16 boys secondary school located in Bournemouth, Dorset, England. By December 2018, a total of 774 boys were enrolled at the school. The current Head Teacher, Leon Lima, is the head of both Winton Academy and the separate girls' school, Glenmoor, both part of the United Learning trust.

== History ==
The school was founded in 1877 and was expanded on a restricted site until 1995 when it moved to its present site. The original "Main School" was situated on Coronation Avenue in Moordown. This was where the school office and Senior Leadership team were based as well as 2 halls and classrooms for English, Maths, Languages and PE. In the 70s a temporary ROSLA (Raising Of School Leaving Age) block was erected to increase the capacity of the school. These included an Art studio, RE and Humanities classrooms. This building was still in use until the closure of the school in 1995. Onsite was also a "Caretaker's House with part of this being used as a Music Classroom and a "Dining Centre" where hot food was available at break and lunch time.

For Science and Technology lessons, there was a second site called the "Annexe" on Oswald Road, which was on the same site as Winton Junior School, 0.3 miles away. This meant pupils would need to walk back and forth depending on the timetable between the sites.

The games field was situated on what is now the current school next to Glenmoor School. This meant for several years, the school operated on 3 sites. For games lessons, once a week the students would be put on a double-decker bus to take them to the games field.

Originally named Winton Boys' School the school then changed its name to Winton School and then again to Winton Arts and Media College. After converting to academy status in 2013 the school was renamed as Winton Academy.

The school is situated next to Glenmoor Academy for girls, and as of September 2013, the two schools are linked as part of the United Learning trust.

=== 2018 inspection ===
Winton Academy was inspected by Ofsted between 11 and 12 December 2018, who found the school to be outstanding in all areas – effectiveness of leadership and management, quality of teaching, learning and assessment, personal development, behaviour and welfare and outcomes for pupils. At the schools previous inspection, it was graded by Ofsted as "good". Inspectors argued that "leaders are driven and passionate about the quality of education and improving pupils’ futures", recognising that this passion was shared by governors, staff and, "increasingly, pupils". Additionally, inspectors found that the academic outcomes and personal development of boys attending Winton Academy to be outstanding, recognising that boys attending the school made very strong progress from their starting points, with this having been the case previously between 2015 and 2018.

The quality of teaching and learning provided to boys at the school was found to be "consistently effective across almost all subjects", with a curriculum that gives boys access to a broad range of courses and experiences across the school. The schools support for pupils with special educational needs and/or disabilities (SEND) was praised as "exceptional", with inspectors highlighting that boys attending the school "feel safe" and "behave well". Whilst recognising fixed-term exclusions reducing, the number of boys who were removed from lessons to work away from their peers was also reducing, but progress in languages was found to be weaker than progress in other subjects.

== Academic attainment ==
In 2013, Winton Academy was the top performing non-selective school in Bournemouth and Poole, and in 2014 was the top performing boys' non-selective school in Bournemouth and Poole. Winton Academy was ranked 15th when compared to 50 other similar schools across England. Again, Winton Academy was named the top performing non-selective boys' school in Bournemouth and Poole in 2015, and was recognised in 2016 as the top-performing non-selective school in Bournemouth, Poole and Christchurch, with 74% of boys achieving GCSE Level 5 A*-C grades, including in English & Maths. The same year, Winton Academy was recognised as having the most improved results in the whole of the South West region.

In 2017, Winton Academy received a Performance 8 score of +0.65, recognising the success of 70% of boys achieving GCSE A* - C (or 4+) in both English & Mathematics. Mathematics GCSE results 9 - 4 stood at 83%, English GCSE 9 - 4 stop at 75%, and GCSE Sciences results at A* - C were 70%. 80% of boys achieved 4+ in both English and Mathematics, with a 78% pass rate in English, 91% in Maths and 81% in Science in 2018, whilst 78% of boys achieved a standard pass or above in English and Mathematics in 2019. Results for Winton Academy continued to be strong following the COVID-19 pandemic, with 86% of boys having achieved 4+ in both English and Mathematics in 2022, leading Winton Academy to achieve a Performance 8 score of 0.89, whilst in 2023, 87% of boys achieved a 4+ in both English and Mathematics, with 75% obtaining a 5+ in English and Mathematics.

== Admissions ==
Admissions of boys to Winton Academy is the responsibility of the schools Governors, with the entry into Year 7 and the admissions application as well as the offer process will be coordinated by Bournemouth, Christchurch & Poole Admissions Services. All boys who are admitted to Winton Academy are done so without reference to ability or aptitude. A waiting list is operational for boys who were either refused a place, or missed out on a space at Winton Academy, due to being out-with the schools catchment area.

== School houses ==
A house system is in place at Winton Academy alongside the school year groups, with the house system designed to develop a sense of community, offer boys the chance to work with other year groups whilst feeling more connected with the community across the school and out–with. Boys can achieve house points though house events, as well as displaying their house values whilst conducting themselves around the school and in their learning. House points are added to a league table, leading to the awarding of a house trophy at the end of the summer term.

Throughout the academic year, Heads of Houses, alongside the house student leaders, coordinate service, sporting, charity and arts events.

The current houses at Winton Academy are:

- Attenbourgh
- Ennis
- King
- Rowling
- Wilson
