= Wye School =

Wye Free School

Location
- Kempe Centre; Olantigh Road; Wye, Kent, TN25 5EJ; England; 51°11′07″N 0°56′29″E

Information
- Type: Free school
- Established: 2013
- Department for Education URN: 139664 Tables
- Ofsted: Reports
- Principal: Luke Magee
- Gender: Mixed
- Age: 11 to 18
- Enrolment: 600
- Website: http://www.wyeschool.org.uk

Wye School is a British, mixed, secondary, free school in Wye, Kent. As of 2022, it is operated by United Learning.

== History ==
Wye School opened in September 2013, following a community campaign for a free school in the Ashford area.

In June 2015, the school had its first Ofsted inspection, and was judged to be 'Good'. That grading was confirmed in 2018.

== Academic results ==
In 2018, the school's first students received their GCSE results. 66% achieved five or more 9-4/A*-C grades including English and mathematics.

In 2019, 78% of students achieved at least a grade 4, or above in both English and mathematics. Forty nine per cent achieved grade 5 or above in both subjects.
