= Kings Manor Community College =

King's Manor Community College

Location
- Kingston Lane; Shoreham-by-Sea, West Sussex, BN43 6YT; England; 50°50′13″N 0°14′44″W

Information
- Established: 1970
- Closed: 2009
- Local authority: West Sussex
- Specialist: Humanities College
- Department for Education URN: 126079 Tables
- Ofsted: Reports
- Gender: Coeducational
- Age: 12 to 18
- Enrolment: 1337
- Houses: 3 (Wells, Doyle, Kipling)
- Website: http://www.kingsmanor.w-sussex.sch.uk/

Kings Manor Community College (formerly Kings Manor School) was a comprehensive school located in Shoreham-by-Sea, West Sussex, United Kingdom. A specialist status state school, Kings Manor closed and reopened as an Academy named Shoreham Academy, with funding from the central government, in September 2009.

Kings Manor School was formed in 1970 by the merger of King's Manor Girls school in Kingston Lane which had opened in 1959, with Shoreham and Southwick Senior Boys County school in Middle Road which had opened in 1937. Initially, the school operated on both sites, but later all facilities were transferred to the Kingston Lane site.

The school took students from year seven through year eleven and had an adjoined sixth form college, the student population of which was derived primarily from the main school. The wide catchment area of the school resulted in pupils being taken from diverse social-economic backgrounds.

For ease of administration, each year group was divided into ten bands, assigned the letter K or M and a number from 1-5 (e.g. 9K5 or 10M3). However, beyond this, there was little resemblance to a traditional house system.

With regard to uniforms, year seven, eight, and nine pupils wore dark blue shirts while those in years ten and eleven wore pale blue.

In 2008, Secretary of State for Children, Schools and Families Ed Balls noted King's Manor as one of 11 schools in the Sussex area which qualified as "failing schools" because less than 30% of students manage to achieve A-C grades at General Certificate of Secondary Education (GCSE). In 2007, just 23% of pupils attained five or more GCSEs at Grade C or above including English and Maths, which was roughly half the national average of 46.7%; only 11% of pupils got an A*-C pass in GCSE Science.

== Notable former pupils ==
- Paul Johnson (born 1967), economist
- Simon Funnell, football player
