= Avonbourne Boys' Academy =

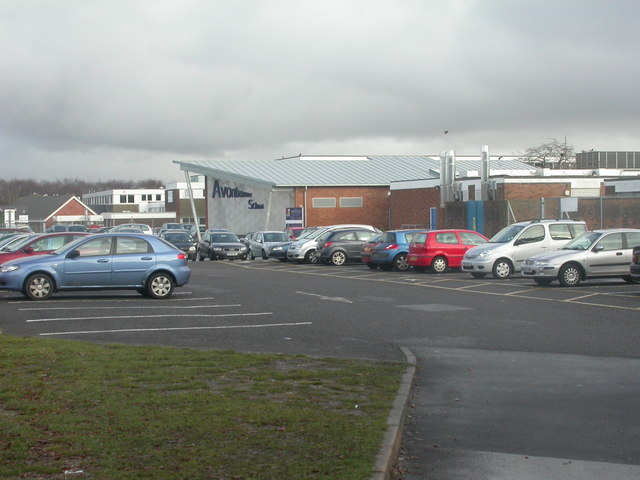

Location
- Harewood Avenue; Bournemouth, Dorset, BH7 6NZ; England
- Coordinates: 50°44′20″N 1°49′38″W

Information
- Type: 11–16 boys Academy
- Motto: Labor Omnia Vincit
- Local authority: Bournemouth, Christchurch and Poole
- Trust: United Learning
- Department for Education URN: 147467 Tables
- Ofsted: Reports
- Principal: Michelle Dyer
- Gender: Boys
- Age: 11 to 16
- Colour
- Website: Avonbourne Boys' Academy

Avonbourne Boys' Academy (previously "Harewood College" and "Portchester School") is an 11–16 boys secondary school with academy status in Bournemouth, England. The school was formerly located on Portchester Road, but was moved to a new site on Harewood Avenue, with the former building being demolished.

== School history ==
The school opened in January 1940 in the building previously used by Bournemouth School, which had been built in 1901. The school took its name from. The school would later move to the present site along Harewood Avenue at Littledown in 1975 next to the sister school, Avonbourne School, although the Portchester Road building was also used until 1989. During the time after the school moved to Littledown, pupils attended both schools on alternate days until the "old school" at Portchester Road closed. Fenwick Court is now on the site and is named after Dr Fenwick, who was the first headmaster of Bournemouth School.

The school changed its name from Portchester School to Harewood College in 2012. Additions have been added to the college in the following years and it now shares a sports hall, the Roy Moore Sports Hall, with Avonbourne that was built in 2012. Also recently, student Tom Clark became a Guinness world record holder for rowing. The 2012 World Junior and Cadet Kurash Championship was held at Harewood College's Roy Moore Sports Hall, of which a student from the school itself won a second place award.

Harewood College, alongside other schools from the Avonbourne Trust, were acquired by United Learning in July 2019, with the 2 lower schools being re-branded as Avonbourne Boys' Academy (previously Harewood College) and Avonbourne Girls' Academy (previously Avonbourne School). This change also affected Avonbourne Sixth Form, which was re-branded as United Sixth Form for the start of the 2019-2020 academic year.

Avonbourne Boys' Academy shares a site with Avonbourne Girls' Academy (which also includes United Sixth Form). From the start of the 2011-12 academic year, the schools have been working more closely together. Starting in the 2019-2020 academic year, the schools became more inter-linked with shared communal areas and some subjects being held at either of the 2 academies.

== Overview ==
=== Academic attainment ===
The academic performance record at Avonbourne Boys' Academy is above the national average in England, with the percentage of boys who achieved Grade 5 or above in English and Maths GCSEs standing at 59%, above the local authority average of 54% and the England average of 45%. The schools Attainment 8 score, a score based on how well pupils have performed in up to 8 GCSE qualifications, was just below the local authority average (50%), with the school scoring 49.3%.

During the academic session 2021–2022, 79% of boys achieved a Standard Pass in English and Maths at grade 4+, compared to 27% in 2018–2019. In the same year, 58% of boys achieved a strong pass in English and Maths at grade 5+, compared to 11% in 2018–2019. 89% of boys either stayed in education or entered employment after leaving Avonbourne Boys' Academy in 2021–2022.

=== Facilities ===
In the school, there are five technology rooms, five English rooms, seven science rooms, five IT rooms, three MFL rooms, five humanities rooms, five maths rooms and two music rooms, amongst many others. The school has also two drama studios, two halls, a library, a sports lab, a science lab, a fully equipped gym, a sports hall and music studio. There are outdoor tennis and basketball courts. The sports hall is new and is called the Roy Moore Sports Hall. It has seven badminton courts and a rock climbing wall.

=== Sixth form ===
United Sixth Form (previously Avonbourne Sixth Form up until the trust's acquisition by United Learning), accepts students of both genders unlike both schools themselves. The 6th form has the same standards as most other 6th forms of the area. This being: 5 C-A* including English and Maths. No uniform is applied to these students.

Pupils from both the Avonbourne Boys' and Girls' Academies as well as other schools across the borough can join. The building for the 6th form was built in the grounds of Avonbourne Girls' Academy.

Following the acquisition of the trust by United Learning, the 6th form was re-branded to United Sixth Form
