= Steven Pinder =

English actor

Steven Pinder (born 30 March 1960) is an English actor, known for his roles on the British soap operas Crossroads (1985–1987) and Brookside (1990–2003).

== Early life ==
Pinder was born on 30 March 1960 in Whalley, Lancashire, England. He has a sister, Catherine, who is 11 years younger and works in agriculture. He grew up on Downham Avenue in Great Harwood. His father was the bank manager of the NatWest in Blackburn.

He got his first job working in a cemetery when he was 15. He joined Blackburn Arts Club, then Manchester Youth Theatre, at 17.

He attended Norden High School on Stourton Street in Rishton near Blackburn, where he took his A levels. He went to the Drama Centre London (now part of the University of the Arts London) in Clerkenwell.

== Career ==
Pinder is known for his role in the soap opera Brookside. He played Max Farnham in the series from 1990 to its conclusion in 2003. Previously in his career, he played the part of Roy Lambert in Crossroads. He also appeared in two series of the sitcom Foxy Lady, C.A.T.S. Eyes and the BBC Scotland comedy series Scotch and Wry. In December 2019, he appeared in an episode of the BBC medical drama Casualty as Mark Jowilt.

=== Theatre ===
When Pinder left Brookside, he took part in several theatre roles, including Laurence in Abigail's Party and later appearing in a psychological thriller, Dead Certain.

Pinder joined the 1st UK–Ireland tour of Wicked in the roles of both the Wizard and Dr Dillamond on 16 September 2014. He reprised these two roles in the second UK–Ireland tour in 2017 and the international tour in 2016. He is currently playing Dr Dillamond in the West End production, having returned to the role on 24 October 2023.

== Personal life ==
Pinder is married to actress Stephanie Chambers and they have a daughter, Scarlett Rose. He has two other children, Helen and Alex, from his first marriage.
