= Avonbourne Girls' Academy =

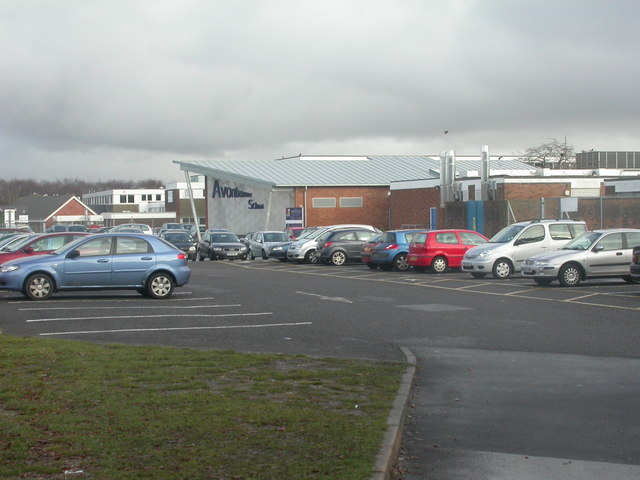

Location
- Harewood Avenue; Bournemouth, Dorset, BH7 6NY; England
- Coordinates: 50.7386°N 1.8275°W

Information
- Type: Academy
- Local authority: Bournemouth, Christchurch and Poole
- Trust: United Learning
- Department for Education URN: 138193 Tables
- Ofsted: Reports
- Head teacher: Michelle Dyer
- Gender: Girls
- Age: 11 to 16
- Enrolment: 1,185 (2024)
- Website: www.avonbournegirlsacademy.org.uk

Avonbourne Girls' Academy (formerly Avonbourne College) is a secondary school with academy status located in Bournemouth, Dorset, England. It is a single-sex all-girls school for 11- to 16-year-olds.

== History ==
The school was originally located in a building on Lowther Road. The old building was used by Bournemouth School and as a hospital until 1939. In 1940 the main building was taken over by the new Portchester School, an all-boys senior school. The nearby Alma Road Boys School became an infant and junior school and the Alma Road Girls School became a senior school for girls in the local area. The Alma Road schools were bombed in an air raid in 1940 and the girls senior school moved into the Lowther Road building.

The school changed its name to Avonbourne School in 1948 and remained at Lowther Road until 1970. New buildings for Portchester School were built next to Avonbourne in 1975 and both schools now share sports facilities and playing fields. The site of the school at Lowther Road is now used by Malmsbury Park Primary School who moved into a new building there in 1972.

The school converted to academy status in June 2012.

A 6th Form block (previously Avonbourne Sixth Form but now operating as United Sixth Form) has been built for the new co-educational 6th Form which opened in September 2012 in conjunction with the boys school, Avonbourne Boys' Academy (formerly Harewood College), next door. Other recent builds include an arts block in (2013) and a new Primary School, Avonwood (opened autumn 2014).

Avonbourne School, alongside other schools from the Avonbourne Trust, were acquired by United Learning in July 2019, with the 2 lower schools being re-branded as Avonbourne Girls' Academy (previously Avonbourne School) and Avonbourne Boys' Academy (previously Harewood College). This change also affected Avonbourne Sixth Form, which was re-branded as United Sixth Form for the start of the 2019–2020 academic year.

== Location ==
Avonbourne is located on Harewood Avenue, Bournemouth, UK, next to Avonbourne Boys' Academy and the nearby Tregonwell Academy (formally The Bicknell School) and St Peters Primary School.

The catchment area of Avonbourne Girls' Academy is from many parts of Bournemouth, mostly the Iford area, where the school is located, and Boscombe, Springbourne, Pokesdown, Southbourne, Charminster and Bournemouth centre. Being popular, many out-of-catchment-area pupils come to the school.

== Former House system ==
When students enrolled to the school they were divided into one of the four houses which were named after prominent females in history. The houses were called by the female's surname and are associated with a colour.

- Charlotte Brontë - house colour is green
- Edith Cavell - house colour is blue
- Elizabeth Fry - house colour is yellow
- Florence Nightingale - house colour is red

There were generally two forms in each House for each of the five years. Most teachers in the school belonged to a House. During the course of the academic year, sporting competitions were held between the houses, called inter-house. In July, the annual Sports day was held where many students supported their house. It was a very competitive day with non-competitors dressing in their house colours and staff also involved in sports and challenges.

As of September 2019 the houses were disbanded in line with other United Learning Trust academies.

== School logo ==
The school logo is a person grown into a tree.It shows personal growth and wisdom

- Bronte has the symbol of a book, being a famous British novelist
- Cavell has the symbol of a poppy, being a famous British World War I nurse and humanitarian
- Fry has the symbol of a prison, being a famous English prisoner reformer
- Nightingale has the symbol of an oil lamp, being a famous nurse in the Crimean War, becoming known as The Lady With The Lamp

The new overall academy "brand" logo is that of the United Learning trust, it is a symbolic tree representing the roots of learning and blossoming knowledge.
