= Val Robinson (field hockey) =

English field hockey player (1941–2022)

Valerie Robinson
Personal information
- National team: England
- Born: Valerie Walsh; 18 December 1941 Accrington, Lancashire, England
- Died: 13 February 2022 (aged 80) Read, Lancashire, England

Sport
- Country: England
- Sport: Field hockey
- Updated on 16 April 2017

Valerie Robinson OBE (née Walsh; 18 December 1941 – 13 February 2022) was an England and Great Britain field hockey international, who played 149 international games and represented her country for more than 20 years.

== Background ==
Valerie Walsh was born at a maternity home in Accrington, Lancashire, England, on 18 December 1941.

She married Gwyn Robinson, a rugby-mad Welshman. They didn't have any children. Robinson managed to maintain her athleticism despite smoking and drinking. She died from cancer at her home in Read, Lancashire, on 13 February 2022, at the age of 80.

== Hockey ==
Robinson started to play hockey at the age of 14 for Accrington High School and became the first working class girl to be capped by England when she won her first cap in 1963. The highlight of her international career was winning a World Championship with England in 1975 in Edinburgh. She played in five world championships in total, and 19 Wembley internationals, and was the first Englishwoman to win 100 caps. She was, however, denied the opportunity to compete in the inaugural women's hockey event at the Olympics due to the British team's boycott of the 1980 Moscow Games. She believed that Britain could have won gold that year, although they failed to qualify for the Los Angeles Olympics four years later.

Her ability to take on opponents set her apart, and her style was to body swerve and then go for goal. This technique often worked well, although her teammates were sometimes frustrated as she missed opportunities to pass to them when they were in better positions. She took many knocks, though withstood them and never missed an international game due to injury.

She later became a PE teacher and then in 1980 opened a residential hockey centre. She won two series of multi-sport TV competition Superstars - 1979 and 1981, and in 1985 she was named an officer of the Order of the British Empire for her contribution to her sport. She continued to play competitive hockey for Blackburn Northern into the late 1990s.

== Football ==
Robinson also played football for Accrington Ladies, but the team folded in 1959 when she was 16 years old. She then became one of several players to join nearby Preston Ladies. Preston's manager Kath Latham recalled: "Matt Busby came to see one of our matches at Blackpool. He sat in the stands and remarked to the people around him that Val was the best player he had ever seen in his life and if she had been a man, he would have signed her up there and then, to play for Manchester United!" In the 1962 season Robinson was named Preston's joint-Player of the Year and Sheila Parker was Young Player of the Year. Robinson stopped playing football shortly afterwards, to focus on her hockey career.

== Bibliography ==
- Newsham, Gail J (2014). In a League of Their Own! The Dick, Kerr Ladies 1917 –1965. London, England: Paragon Publishing. ISBN 978-1782221838.
