= Edward Slinger =

English cricketer and judge (1938–2023)

Personal information
- Born: 2 February 1938; Accrington, Lancashire, England
- Died: 31 July 2023 (aged 85)
- Batting: Right-handed
- Bowling: Leg break

Domestic team information
- Years: Team
- 1967: Marylebone Cricket Club

Career statistics
Competition	First-class
Matches	1
Runs scored	12
Batting average	–
100s/50s	–/–
Top score	12*
Catches/stumpings	1/–
- Source: Cricinfo, 1 November 2021

Edward Slinger (2 February 1938 – 31 July 2023) was an English first-class cricketer, solicitor and judge.

== Biography ==
Slinger was born at Accrington on 2 February 1938. He was educated in the town at Accrington Grammar School, before going up to Balliol College, Oxford. After graduating from Balliol, he was admitted to practice as a solicitor in 1961. Although Slinger did not play cricket for Oxford University Cricket Club while studying at Oxford, he did feature for the Lancashire Second Eleven between 1963 and 1978, making 72 appearances in the Minor Counties Championship; despite his large number of appearances for the second eleven, he never featured for the first eleven. Slinger did however feature in one first-class match for the Marylebone Cricket Club (MCC) against Oxford University at Oxford in 1967. Batting once in a match heavily affected by poor weather, he scored 12 not out in the MCC's first and only innings. He was appointed a circuit judge in 1995, before retiring in 2010. He additionally sat as a member of the Parole Board for England and Wales from 2009, and was a governor of Westholme School.

Slinger died on 31 July 2023, at the age of 85.
