= Nuneaton Academy =

The Nuneaton Academy

Location
- Radnor Drive; Nuneaton, Warwickshire, CV10 7PD; England
- Coordinates: 52.514690°N 1.498760°W

Information
- Type: Academy
- Motto: The Best in Everyone
- Religious affiliation: Open to all (All-Inclusive)
- Established: c. 2011
- Department for Education URN: 136158 Tables
- Ofsted: Reports
- Principal: Mark Dalton
- Gender: Coeducational
- Age: 11 to 16
- Houses: Ignis, Aqua, Orbis, Ventus
- Colours: Navy, silver and blue
- Website: http://www.nuneatonacademy.org.uk/

The Nuneaton Academy (formerly Alderman Smith School) is a coeducational secondary school with academy status located in Nuneaton, Warwickshire, England.

Originally Alderman Smith School, the school was formally closed in 2011 and reopened the next day as Nuneaton Academy, with largely the same pupils and staff. Nuneaton Academy was part of a trust named the Midlands Academy Trust with Hartshill Academy, George Eliot Academy and Heath Lane Academy. In 2023, it was announced that United Learning Trust will take over the original trust. United Learning officially took over the school in September 2024.
