= Sheffield Park Academy =

Academy in Sheffield, South Yorkshire, England

Location
- Beaumont Road North; Sheffield, South Yorkshire, S2 1SN; England; 53°22′29″N 1°25′16″W

Information
- Type: Academy
- Motto: The Best In Everyone
- Established: 2006
- Local authority: Sheffield City Council
- Trust: United Learning
- Department for Education URN: 131895 Tables
- Ofsted: Reports
- Principal: Rob Watson
- Gender: Co-educational
- Age: 11 to 19
- Enrolment: 1,167
- Website: http://www.sheffieldpark-academy.org/

Sheffield Park Academy is a high performing 11–18 secondary school in Sheffield, South Yorkshire, England, with almost 1,200 pupils, including 150 in a dedicated Sixth Form.

The academy is part of United Learning, a national group of schools whose motto is 'the best in everyone'. It opened in 2006 on the site of the predecessor school, Waltheof, moving into a £30 million, purpose-built facility in 2008.

Since then, the academy's sustained academic success has seen it placed in the top 5% of schools in the country according to the Progress 8 measure. This is the government's new measure that records pupil progress from the end of the primary school to the end of secondary school.

== Admissions ==
The academy is a co-educational school, catering for pupils aged 11 to 18, of all faiths and none. It has a dedicated Sixth Form, which maintains an excellent record of students going on to university or employment and apprenticeships.

== Academic achievements ==
After a visit from Ofsted in October 2017, the academy maintained its 'Good' grading in all aspects of the inspection framework. Inspectors also noted how the academy had "taken action to respond to the areas for improvement identified in the last inspection report".

Key findings of the inspection report were as follows:

- "There are a wide range of different cultures in the school and it is a tribute to the efforts of leaders that there is such a harmonious atmosphere in the school and that tolerance and the acceptance of diversity are at its very heart."
- "The academy has worked hard to raise aspirations of the most able pupils. As a result, the most able pupils can see opportunities for education and careers beyond their local community. In discussions that inspectors held with some of your most able Year 11 pupils, it was clear that many had clear, precise plans to study A levels and then go to university."
- "Teachers described staff morale as high. There is a real emphasis on working together as a team and this has resulted in a coherent and happy staff. They feel well supported by leaders."
- "There is a strong, well-established system of professional development in the school. Working with United Learning and local schools and teaching alliances, the school has developed a wide range of training packages. This bespoke model of training is important in developing the considerable number of new teachers, recruited to cater for the increased number of pupils."
