= Oakley School, Bishop's Tachbrook =

All-through school in Leamington Spa, Warwickshire, England

Oakley School

Location
- Oakley Wood Road; Bishop's Tachbrook, Warwickshire, CV33 9QE; England
- 52°15′26″N 1°32′12″W

Information
- Type: Free school
- Established: September 2023; 2 years ago
- Local authority: Warwickshire
- Trust: Stowe Valley Multi Academy Trust
- Department for Education URN: 149717 Tables
- Ofsted: Reports
- Headteacher: Sarah Kaye
- Gender: Coeducational
- Age: 4 to 16
- Colours: Green and black
- Website: https://oakley-school.com/

Oakley School is a coeducational all-through school located in Bishop's Tachbrook (near Leamington Spa and Warwick) The school formally opened in September 2023, construction on the school site was completed in 2024. The first students were temporarily housed in a facility at nearby Myton School until completion of the new school site.

== History ==
Oakley School was built to serve the need of over 1000 school placements generated by the neighbouring newly-built Oakley Grove housing estate. With an initial funding of £56,000,000 (equivalent to £64,000,000 in 2025) from the Warwickshire County Council (WCC), later increased to over £60,000,000 (equivalent to £68,000,000 in 2025), it will be the most expensive school ever funded by the council. Its first students were Year 7 pupils, who were housed in a temporary facility at Myton School for the academic year beginning September 2023. After which the students moved to the Oakley School site alongside a further Year 7 cohort and its first reception year group.

The school appointed its first headteacher Sarah Kaye in October 2022.

Planning permission for the school site was given in 2019. Although originally expected to be open by 2023, work on the school site began on 12 December 2022. The school relocated to its permanent site, where it officially opened on 4 September 2024.

== Controversy ==
The decision to delay the school's site opening by a year was met with anger from nearby residents, as many residents had moved to the nearby housing estate with the expectation of the school being ready for 2023. The school's solution to temporarily send pupils to a nearby school also drew criticism from residents, including a campaign group of over 200 parents and Labour Party Member of Parliament Matt Western, suggesting it could have a negative impact on their children's education and put pressure on nearby schools.

Oakley School's lack of a sixth form also faced criticism. Parents feared there would not be enough sixth form placements for the area, although WCC was confident a new sixth form was not "urgently needed".
