= Hyndburn Academy =

The Hyndburn Academy

Location
- Stourton Street; Rishton, Lancashire, BB1 4ED; England
- 53.7709°N 2.4185°W

Information
- Type: Academy
- Motto: "The best in everyone"
- Established: 1942
- Local authority: Lancashire
- Trust: United Learning
- Department for Education URN: 144356 Tables
- Ofsted: Reports
- Headteacher: Umar Wazir
- Gender: Mixed
- Age: 11 to 16
- Enrolment: 396
- Capacity: 685
- Houses: Fortis; Nexa; Pinnacle; Ignite; Veritas
- Website: www.thehyndburnacademy.org.uk

The Hyndburn Academy, previously known as Norden High School and Sports College, is the united learning academy school situated in the town of Rishton, Lancashire, United Kingdom. The current headteacher is Umar Wazir, who was appointed in 2025.

== Description ==
The school provides secondary education for around 600 children aged 11 to 16 who live in the towns of Rishton, Great Harwood, Clayton-Le-Moors and Accrington. In the 2019 GCSE results, the percentage of students who received Grade 5 or higher was 19%, and 39.7% of students achieved the Progress 8 benchmark.

The school gained sports college status in 2004,

== Ofsted ratings ==
Following an Ofsted inspection in 2016, the school received a rating of 'Inadequate'. It subsequently became part of the United Learning trust of academies and was rebranded as The Hyndburn Academy in 2017. The school had a further Ofsted inspection in 2022 and received a rating of 'Good'.

== Notable former pupils ==
- Brett Ormerod, professional footballer
- Steven Pinder, actor
- Graham Duff, Writer and creator of Ideal, BBC TV Comedy Series
