= Simon Funnell =

English footballer

Personal information
- Full name: Simon Paul Funnell
- Date of birth: 8 August 1974 (age 52)
- Place of birth: Shoreham-by-Sea, England
- Height: 6 ft 0 in (1.83 m)
- Position: Forward

Youth career
- Adur Athletic
- Southampton
- 1990–1992: Brighton & Hove Albion

Senior career*
Years	Team	Apps	(Gls)
1992–1995	Brighton & Hove Albion	28	(50)
1995	→ Shoreham (loan)		
- Stamco
–2001	Worthing		
2001–2002	Bognor Regis Town		
2002–200?	Southwick		
- Three Bridges

Managerial career
- 2011–2014: East Grinstead Town
- 2015–2016: Shoreham
- 2016–2017: Worthing United
- 2021–2024: Copthorne
- 2024–2025: Alfold
- * Club domestic league appearances and goals

Simon Paul Funnell (born 8 August 1974) is an English former professional footballer who played as a forward in the Football League for Brighton & Hove Albion.

== Life and career ==
Funnell was born in 1974 in Shoreham-by-Sea, West Sussex, where he attended King's Manor School. He played youth football for Adur Athletic and was an associate schoolboy with Southampton before joining Brighton & Hove Albion as a trainee in 1990. He made his senior debut in May 1992, in the last match of the season that confirmed Brighton's relegation from the Second Division. He turned professional soon afterwards, and made 25 appearances in the 1993–94 season, but played rarely thereafter following an injury, and spent time on loan at Sussex County League club Shoreham before being released in 1995. Funnell went on to play non-league football in the Sussex area for clubs including Stamco, Worthing, Bognor Regis Town, Southwick, Oakwood and Three Bridges, before moving into coaching and management at non-league level with clubs including East Grinstead Town, Chipstead, Shoreham, Horsham, and Worthing United. He became manager of Copthorne in August 2021, remaining in post until resigning in February 2024. In May 2024 he was appointed manager of Alfold of the Southern Combination.
