= Harry Yeadon =

British engineer

Harry Leslie Yeadon (28 May 1922 – 8 February 2015) was a British civil engineer. He had a pivotal role in creating the UK's first motorway.
