= Hartshill Academy =

Location
- Church Road; Hartshill; Warwickshire, CV10 0NA; England; 52.5405°N 1.5192°W

Information
- Type: Academy
- Established: 1957
- Local authority: Warwickshire
- Trust: United Learning
- Department for Education URN: 138644 Tables
- Ofsted: Reports
- Principal: Lorraine Taylor
- Gender: Mixed
- Age: 11 to 16
- Enrolment: 989 as of December 2021
- Website: www.hartshillacademy.org.uk

Hartshill Academy (formerly Hartshill School) is a mixed secondary school located in Hartshill area of Nuneaton in the English county of Warwickshire.

Feeder schools include Nathaniel Newton Infant School and Michael Drayton Junior School amongst others.

Established in 1957, the school converted to academy status in 2012 and is now sponsored by the Midland Academy Trust.

Hartshill Academy educates pupils from the Hartshill area of Nuneaton and surrounding areas. The school offers GCSEs and BTECs as programmes of study for pupils.

The school formally joined United Learning in December 2023.
