= Bishop's Tachbrook =

Village in Warwickshire, England

Coordinates: 52.24945°N 1.54195°W

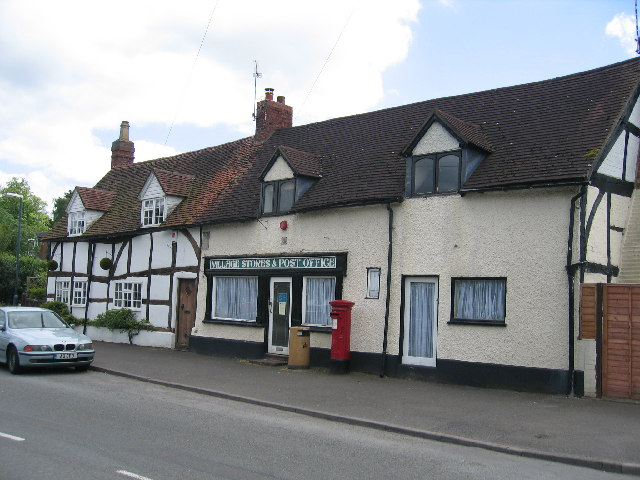
- Old location of the post office

- Location within Warwickshire
- Population: 2,558 (2011 census)
- Civil parish: Bishop's Tachbrook
- District: Warwick
- Shire county: Warwickshire
- Region: West Midlands
- Country: England
- Sovereign state: United Kingdom
- Post town: Leamington Spa
- Postcode district: CV33
- Dialling code: 01926
- Police: Warwickshire
- Fire: Warwickshire
- Ambulance: West Midlands

Bishop's Tachbrook is a village and civil parish in the Warwick District of Warwickshire, England. The village is about 3 miles (5 km) south of Warwick and Leamington Spa. A church at Bishop's Tachbrook is mentioned in the Domesday Book. The village contains traditional half-timbered buildings, and modern residences including council-built terraced houses.

== Facilities, amenities and football clubs ==
- Small retail outlets including a corner shop
- A primary school for children aged 4 to 11
- Its park which includes a BMX track
- The Leopard pub-restaurant, the oldest part of which was a mortuary for the nearby crematorium
- The 'Victory Club' – a community hall for most social events including church socials.
- A sports and social club is the base for Leamington Hibernians FC of the Midland Football League, while the National League North side Leamington F.C. play near the village.

== Large charitable workplace ==
The Guide Dogs for the Blind Association breeding centre is based just to the south of the village.

== Tiers of local government ==
Beside its district and county councils, further local provision (including as to footpaths, parks, event planning and comments on planning applications) are provided by a parish council. There are there is no current plan for the total devolution, nor empowering as a unitary authority, for Warwickshire County Council.

== Demography ==
According to the 2001 Census the parish had a population of 2,514, increasing to 2,558 at the 2011 Census.

== See also ==
- Oakley School, Bishop's Tachbrook
