= George Eliot Academy =

Location
- Raveloe Drive; Nuneaton; Warwickshire, CV11 4QP; England; 52.5084°N 1.4582°W

Information
- Type: Academy
- Established: 1961
- Local authority: Warwickshire
- Trust: United Learning
- Department for Education URN: 137079 Tables
- Ofsted: Reports
- Principal: Homeira Zakary
- Gender: Mixed
- Age: 11 to 16
- Enrolment: 786
- Houses: Raccoon, Snake, Duck, Jaguar
- Colours: Yellow, Green, Blue, Red
- Website: georgeeliot.midlandat.co.uk

George Eliot Academy (formerly The George Eliot School) is a coeducational secondary school located in Nuneaton in the English county of Warwickshire. The current Principal is Homeira Zakary and the Deputy Principal is Dee Stanton.

== History ==
The school was established in September 1961, and became a foundation school in September 2009 in partnership with North Warwickshire and Hinckley College. In September 2011 the school converted to academy status and was originally part of the Midland Academies Trust. MAT were taken over by United Learning in 2023.

The school is named after the novelist George Eliot, the pen name of Mary Ann Evans (1819 – 1880), who was born in Nuneaton.

During the installation of solar panels on the Linford building, South building, Sports hall and a part of Main building known as The Mill, a storm on the night of the 27th May 2026 led to significant water damage to Linford building. Subsequent weeks involved many students working from home due to the reduced space in the school - normal attendance only resuming after the conclusion of that year's GCSE examinations - and the building remained closed for the remainder of the academic year.

== Academic performance ==
In the 2023/24 academic year, 41.9% of students achieved a grade 5 or above in English and Mathematics GCSE, which is below the local authority precedent which stands at 48.6%. The George Eliot Academy has an "Attainment 8" score of 44.2 and a Progress 8 score of -0.05.

== Notable former pupils ==
- Laura Harvey, football coach and former player
