= Diocese of Ely =

Diocese of the Church of England

Coordinates: 52°23′55″N 0°15′48″E

Diocese of Ely Dioecesis Eliensis
- Coat of arms of the Bishop of Ely: Gules, three ducal coronets or

- Flag

Location
- Ecclesiastical province: Canterbury
- Archdeaconries: Cambridge, Huntingdon and Wisbech

Statistics
- Parishes: 309
- Churches: 339

Information
- Cathedral: Ely Cathedral
- Language: English

Current leadership
- Bishop: Bishop of Ely (vacant; acting: the Bishop of Huntingdon; bishop-designate: Sarah Clark)
- Suffragan: Dagmar Winter, Bishop of Huntingdon
- Archdeacons: Alexander Hughes, Archdeacon of Cambridge; Richard Harlow, Archdeacon of Huntingdon and Wisbech

Website
- https://www.elydiocese.org/

The Diocese of Ely is a Church of England diocese in the Province of Canterbury. It is headed by the Bishop of Ely, who sits at Ely Cathedral in Ely. There is one suffragan (subordinate) bishop, the Bishop of Huntingdon. The diocese now covers the modern ceremonial county of Cambridgeshire (excluding the Soke of Peterborough) and western Norfolk. The diocese was created in 1109 out of part of the Diocese of Lincoln.

The diocese is ancient, and the area of Ely was part of the patrimony of Saint Etheldreda. A religious house was founded in the city in 673. After her death in 679 she was buried outside the church, and her remains were later reburied inside, the foundress being commemorated as a great Anglian saint.

The diocese has had its boundaries altered various times. From an original diocese covering the historic county of Cambridgeshire and the Isle of Ely, Bedfordshire and Huntingdonshire were added in 1837 from the Diocese of Lincoln, as was the Sudbury archdeaconry in Suffolk from the Diocese of Norwich. In 1914 Bedfordshire became part of the Diocese of St Albans, and western Suffolk became part of the Diocese of St Edmundsbury and Ipswich, whilst Ely took a western part of the Diocese of Norwich. Peterborough remains the seat of the Diocese of Peterborough.

Today the diocese covers an area of 1,507 square miles (3,900 km^{2}). It has a population of 705,000 and comprises 209 benefices, 303 parishes and 335 churches with 145 stipendiary parochial clergy.

== Bishops ==
The diocesan Bishop of Ely (vacant; bishop-designate: Sarah Clark, currently Bishop suffragan of Jarrow and acting Bishop of Durham) is assisted by a Bishop suffragan of Huntingdon (Dagmar Winter).

There are also four retired bishops living in the diocese who are licensed as honorary assistant bishops:

- 2011–present: Lindsay Urwin. Former Area Bishop of Horsham. At present, he is a parish priest in the Anglican Diocese of Melbourne.
- 2012–present: Retired Dean of St Paul's and former Bishop of Sodor and Man Graeme Knowles lives in Bury St Edmunds (in neighbouring Eds & Ips diocese.)
- 2013–present: John Flack, retired Director of the Anglican Centre in Rome & Archbishop's Representative to the Holy See and former Bishop of Huntingdon, lives in Whittlesey.
- 2020–present: Graham Kings, former Bishop of Sherborne.

Alternative episcopal oversight (for parishes in the diocese which reject the ministry of women priests and bishops) is provided by the provincial episcopal visitor, Norman Banks, Bishop suffragan of Richborough, who is licensed as an honorary assistant bishop of the diocese to facilitate his work there.

The Bishop of Peterborough has also been commissioned as assistant bishop in the diocese so that he can exercise pastoral care in several old Huntingdonshire parishes now within the Peterborough unitary authority: including Stanground, Orton, Woodston, Yaxley and Fletton.

== Archdeaconries and deaneries ==
The archdeaconries have been as follows:

- 1109-1837: Ely only.
- 1837-1914/15: Bedford, Ely, Huntingdon, Sudbury.
- 1914/15-2005/06: Ely, Huntingdon, Wisbech.
- 2005/06-: Cambridge, Huntingdon-Wisbech.

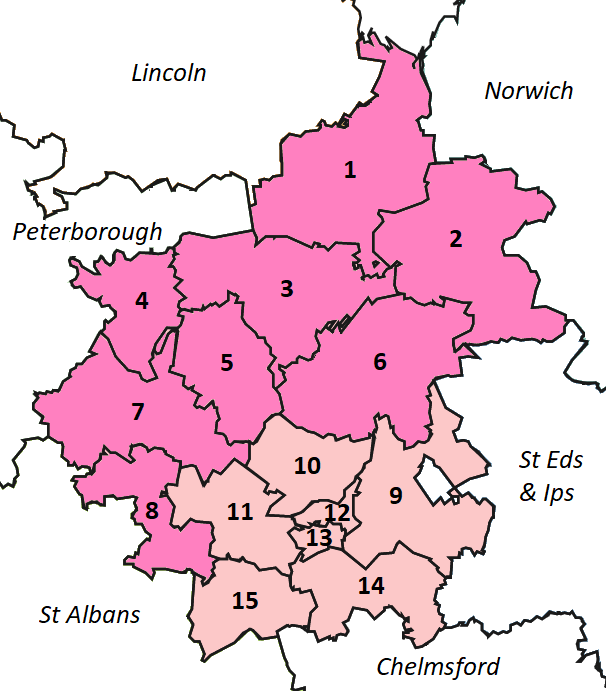
Map of deaneries in Ely Diocese, coloured by archdeaconry (Huntingdon & Wisbech, north; Cambridge, south). Key: (1) Wisbech Lynn Marshland (2) Fincham & Feltwell (3) March (4) Yaxley (5) St Ives (6) Ely (7) Huntingdon (8) St Neots (9) Fordham & Quy (10) North Stowe (11) Bourn (12) Cambridge North (13) Cambridge South (14) Granta (15) Shingay

The archdeaconry of Wisbech (comprising the deaneries of Ely, March, Wisbech, Fincham and Lynn Marshland, which before 1915 were not in any archdeaconry) was active from 1915 to 2005. The following changes to deaneries have taken place:

- in 1884 the two deaneries of Ely and Wisbech (which were not under any archdeaconry, but were commonly known as the Archdeaconry of the Isle of Ely) were reorganised into the three of Ely, March and Wisbech.
- In 1914 the deaneries of Fincham and Lynn Marshland were transferred from the Archdeaconry of Lynn in the Diocese of Norwich to the Diocese of Ely.
- in 1976 the deanery of Shelford was established among others.
- In 2002 the deaneries of Fordham and Quy merged in 2002 to form the deanery of Fordham and Quy, and the deaneries of Wisbech and Lynn Marshland merged to form the deanery of Wisbech Lynn Marshland
- in 2004, the deaneries of Fincham and Feltwell were merged to form the deanery of Fincham and Feltwell, and the deanery of Leightonstone was merged into the deanery of Huntingdon.
- in 2006, the deanery of Cambridge was split in 2006 into the deaneries of Cambridge North and Cambridge South.
- In 2009 the deaneries of Shelford and Linton were merged to form the deanery of Granta.

=== Deaneries in 1851 ===
In 1851 the diocese had the following rural deaneries:

- Barton (Cambs)
- Bedford (Beds)
- Blackbourn (Suffolk)
- Bourn (Cambs)
- Cambridge (Cambs)
- Camps (Cambs)
- Chesterton (Cambs)
- Clapham (Beds)
- Clare (Suffolk)
- Dunstable (Beds)
- Eaton (Beds)
- Ely (Cambs)
- Fleete (Beds)
- Fordham (Cambs/Suffolk)
- Leightonstone (Hunts)
- St Ives (Hunts)
- St Neots (Hunts)
- Shefford (Beds)
- Shingay (Cambs)
- Sudbury (Suffolk)
- Thedwastre (Suffolk)
- Thingoe (Suffolk)
- Wisbech (Cambs)
- Yaxley (Hunts)

Diocese	Archdeaconries	Rural Deaneries	Population
Diocese of Ely	Archdeaconry of Cambridge	Deanery of Bourn	27,913
Diocese of Ely	Archdeaconry of Cambridge	Deanery of Cambridge North	69,975
Diocese of Ely	Archdeaconry of Cambridge	Deanery of Cambridge South	62,428
Diocese of Ely	Archdeaconry of Cambridge	Deanery of Fordham and Quy	29,433
Diocese of Ely	Archdeaconry of Cambridge	Deanery of Granta	33,096
Diocese of Ely	Archdeaconry of Cambridge	Deanery of North Stowe	47,138
Diocese of Ely	Archdeaconry of Cambridge	Deanery of Shingay	21,269
Diocese of Ely	Archdeaconry of Huntingdon & Wisbech	Deanery of Ely	58,230
Diocese of Ely	Archdeaconry of Huntingdon & Wisbech	Deanery of Fincham and Feltwell	36,708
Diocese of Ely	Archdeaconry of Huntingdon & Wisbech	Deanery of Huntingdon	57,830
Diocese of Ely	Archdeaconry of Huntingdon & Wisbech	Deanery of March	58,032
Diocese of Ely	Archdeaconry of Huntingdon & Wisbech	Deanery of St Ives	44,362
Diocese of Ely	Archdeaconry of Huntingdon & Wisbech	Deanery of St Neots	37,630
Diocese of Ely	Archdeaconry of Huntingdon & Wisbech	Deanery of Wisbech Lynn Marshland	65,902
Diocese of Ely	Archdeaconry of Huntingdon & Wisbech	Deanery of Yaxley	77,384

== Churches ==
=== Extra-parochial places ===
- Central Wingland (population 39)
- Grunty Fen (population 211)
- Ely College (population 44): Cathedral of the Holy & Undivided Trinity, Ely (medieval)
- Welches Dam (population 5): St Eanswyth's Church (1909, closed C20th)
- West Fen (population 0)
- Wolveyhills and Wolveyholes (population 0)

=== Archdeaconry of Cambridge ===
==== Deanery of Bourn ====
- Benefice and Parish of Cambourne (population 12,088): Cambourne Church Local Ecumenical Partnership (1999)
- Benefice of Lordsbridge
  - Parish of Barton (population 851): St Peter's Church (medieval)
  - Parish of Caldecote (population 2,034)
    - St Michael and All Angels' Church (medieval)
    - St Mary's Church, Childerley (medieval, closed C16th)
  - Parish of Comberton (population 2,266): St Mary's Church (medieval)
  - Parish of Coton (population 944): St Peter's Church (medieval)
  - Parish of Dry Drayton (population 700): SS Peter & Paul's Church (medieval)
  - Parish of Great Eversden (population 235): St Mary's Church (medieval)
  - Parish of Hardwick (population 2,678): St Mary's Church (medieval)
  - Parish of Harlton (population 311): Assumption of the Blessed Virgin Mary's Church (medieval)
  - Parish of Haslingfield (population 1,546)
    - All Saints' Church (medieval)
    - St Mary's Chapel, White Hill, Haslingfield (medieval, closed C16th)
  - Parish of Little Eversden (population 567): St Helen's Church (medieval)
  - Parish of Toft (population 563): St Andrew's Church (medieval)
- Benefice of Papworth:
  - Parish of Bourn (population 988): SS Helena & Mary's Church (medieval)
  - Parish of Boxworth (population 215): St Peter's Church (medieval)
  - Parish of Caxton (population 600): St Andrew's Church (medieval)
  - Parish of Conington (population 138): St Mary's Church (medieval)
  - Parish of Croxton (population 160): St James's Church (medieval)
  - Parish of Elsworth (population 689): Holy Trinity Church (medieval)
  - Parish of Eltisley (population 386): SS Pandionia & John the Baptist's Church (medieval)
  - Parish of Graveley (population 276)
    - St Botolph's Church (medieval)
    - St John the Baptist's Church, Papworth St Agnes (medieval, closed 1976)
  - Parish of Kingston (population 236): All Saints & St Andrew's Church (medieval)
  - Parish of Knapwell (population 88): All Saints' Church (medieval)
  - Parish of Lolworth (population 161): All Saints' Church (medieval)
  - Parish of Longstowe (population 207): St Mary the Virgin's Church (medieval)
  - Parish of Papworth Everard (population 3,840): St Peter's Church (medieval)
  - Parish of Toseland (population 89): St Michael's Church (medieval)
  - Parish of Yelling (population 323): Holy Cross Church (medieval)

==== Deanery of Cambridge North ====
- Benefice and Parish of Cambridge Holy Cross (population 4,452): Christ the Redeemer Church (C20th)
- Benefice and Parish of Cambridge St Andrew the Great (population 3,193)
  - St Andrew the Great (medieval, rebuilt 1843)
  - Holy Sepulchre Church (The Round Church) (medieval, out of regular use c. 1994)
  - All Saints' Old Church (medieval, demolished 1863)
  - All Saints' New Church (1863, redundant 1973)
- Benefice and Parish of Cambridge St Clement (population 469): St Clement's Church (medieval)
- Benefice and Parish of Cambridge St Mary the Great with St Michael (population 730)
  - St Mary the Great (medieval)
  - St Michael's Church (medieval, closed for worship C20th)
- Benefice and Parish of Cambridge St Matthew (population 3,930): St Matthew's Church (1866)
- Benefice and Parish of Cambridge Ascension (population 18,783)
  - St Giles' Church (medieval)
  - St Augustine of Canterbury's Church (1898)
  - St Luke the Evangelist's Local Ecumenical Partnership (1863, rebuilt 1874)
  - St Peter's Church (by the Castle) (medieval, redundant C20th)
  - All Saints by the Castle (medieval, closed 1365)
- Benefice and Parish of Cambridge Christ Church with St Andrew the Less (population 5,758)
  - Christ Church (1839)
  - St Andrew the Less (medieval, closed 1839)
  - Leper Chapel of St Mary Magdalene, Barnwell (medieval, closed C16th)
  - St John's Mission Chapel, Wellington Street (1874, closed c. 1940)
- Benefice and Parish of Chesterton Good Shepherd (population 15,578)
  - Good Shepherd Church, Chesterton, Cambridge (1958)
  - St John's Church, Orchard Park, Cambridge (2013, in primary school)
- Benefice and Parish of Chesterton St Andrew (population 9,535): St Andrew's Church, Chesterton, Cambridge (medieval)
- Benefice and Parish of Chesterton St George (population 9,214): St George's Church, Chesterton, Cambridge (1938)
- Benefice and Parish of Fen Ditton (population 3,763): St Mary the Virgin's Church (medieval)
- Benefice and Parish of Horningsea (population 328): St Peter's Church (medieval)
- Benefice and Parish of Teversham (population 1,097): All Saints' Church (medieval)

==== Deanery of Cambridge South ====
- Benefice and Parish of Cambridge Holy Trinity (population 1,883): Holy Trinity Church (medieval)
- Benefice and Parish of Cambridge St Barnabas (population 3,287): St Barnabas' Church (1869)
- Benefice and Parish of Cambridge St Benedict (population 988): St Bene't's Church (medieval)
- Benefice and Parish of Cambridge St Botolph (population 2,082): St Botolph's Church (medieval)
- Benefice and Parish of Cambridge St Edward (Proprietary Chapel) (population 1,339)
  - St Edward King and Martyr's Church (medieval)
  - St John the Baptist's Church (St John Zachary) (medieval, closed C15th)
- Benefice and Parish of Cambridge St James (population 6,630): St James's Church (1955)
- Benefice and Parish of Cambridge St John the Evangelist (population 11,385): St John the Evangelist's Church (1896)
- Benefice and Parish of Cambridge St Martin (population 6,891)
  - St Martin's Church (1932, rebuilt 1961)
  - St Thomas's Church (1980)
- Benefice and Parish of Cambridge St Mary the Less (population 1,366)
  - St Mary the Less (medieval, rededicated and rebuilt 1352; previously St Peter's-outside-Trumpington-Gates)
  - St Anne's Chapel (medieval, closed 1546)
- Benefice and Parish of Cambridge St Paul (population 5,665): St Paul's Church (1841)
- Benefice and Parish of Cambridge St Philip (population 9,835)
  - St Philip's Church (1891)
  - St Stephen's Church (1940s, rebuilt 1962, sold 2010)
- Benefice and Parish of Cherry Hinton (population 10,099): St Andrew's Church, Cherry Hinton, Cambridge (medieval)
- Benefice and Parish of Grantchester (population 534): SS Andrew & Mary's Church (medieval)
- Benefice and Parish of Newnham (population 3,050): St Mark's Church, Newnham, Cambridge (1870, rebuilt 1901)
- Benefice and Parish of Trumpington (population 13,343): SS Mary & Michael's Church, Trumpington, Cambridge (medieval)

==== Deanery of Fordham and Quy ====
- Benefice of Anglesey
  - Parish of Bottisham (population 2,476): Holy Trinity Church (medieval)
  - Parish of Lode with Longmeadow (population 848): St James's Church, Lode (1853)
  - Parish of Stow cum Quy (population 548)
    - St Mary's Church, Stow (medieval)
    - St Nicholas' Church, Quy (medieval, closed Middle Ages)
  - Parish of Swaffham Bulbeck (population 820): St Mary's Church (medieval)
  - Parish of Swaffham Prior (population 884)
    - St Mary's Church (medieval)
    - SS Cyriac & Julitta's Church (medieval, rebuilt 1809, closed 1903)
- Benefice and Parish of Ashley with Silverley (population 583)
  - St Mary's Church, Ashley (medieval, rebuilt 1845)
  - All Saints' Church, Silverley (medieval, closed C16th)
  - St John's Chapel, Ashley (medieval, parish church C16th, closed 1845, demolished 1956)
- Benefice and Parish of Burwell with Reach (population 6,753)
  - St Mary's Church, Burwell (medieval)
  - St Etheldreda & Holy Trinity Church, Reach (medieval chapel to St John the Baptist, rebuilt and rededicated 1861)
  - St Andrew's Church, Burwell (medieval, closed c. 1600)
  - St Etheldreda's Chapel, Reach (medieval, closed C16th)
- Benefice and Parish of Cheveley (population 1,100): St Mary & the Holy Host's Church (medieval)
- Benefice and Parish of Fulbourn (population 4,144)
  - St Vigor's Church (medieval)
  - All Saints' Church (medieval, closed 1766)
- Benefice and Parish of Great Wilbraham (population 606): St Nicholas' Church (medieval)
- Benefice and Parish of Kirtling (population 365): All Saints' Church (medieval)
- Benefice and Parish of Little Wilbraham (population 438)
  - St John the Evangelist's Church (medieval)
  - St George's Church, Six Mile Bottom (1890s, rebuilt 1933)
- Benefice of Raddesley
  - Parish of Brinkley (population 359): St Mary's Church (medieval)
  - Parish of Burrough Green (population 514): St Augustine of Canterbury's Church (medieval)
  - Parish of Carlton (population 183)
    - St Peter's Church (medieval)
    - All Saints' Church, Willingham-next-Carlton (medieval, closed C16th)
  - Parish of Dullingham (population 759): St Mary's Church (medieval)
  - Parish of Stetchworth (population 625): St Peter's Church (medieval)
  - Parish of Westley Waterless (population 73): St Mary the Less's Church (medieval)
- Benefice of Three Rivers
  - Parish of Chippenham (population 533): St Margaret of Antioch's Church (medieval)
  - Parish of Fordham (population 2,867): SS Peter & Mary Magdalene's Church (medieval)
  - Parish of Isleham (population 2,663): St Andrew's Church (medieval)
  - Parish of Kennett (population 384): St Nicholas' Church (medieval)
  - Parish of Snailwell (population 179): St Peter's Church (medieval)
- Benefice and Parish of Wicken (population 841): St Laurence's Church (medieval)
- Benefice and Parish of Wood Ditton with Saxon Street (population 829)
  - St Mary's Church, Woodditton (medieval)
  - Holy Trinity Church, Saxon Street (1877, closed c. 1986)

All Saints' church, Newmarket, was in this portion of the diocese until it was transferred to Suffolk in 1889. It was a chapelry to Woodditton until the 19th century. The chapelry of St Nicholas, Landwade, was also in this portion of the diocese until it was transferred to Suffolk.

==== Deanery of Granta ====
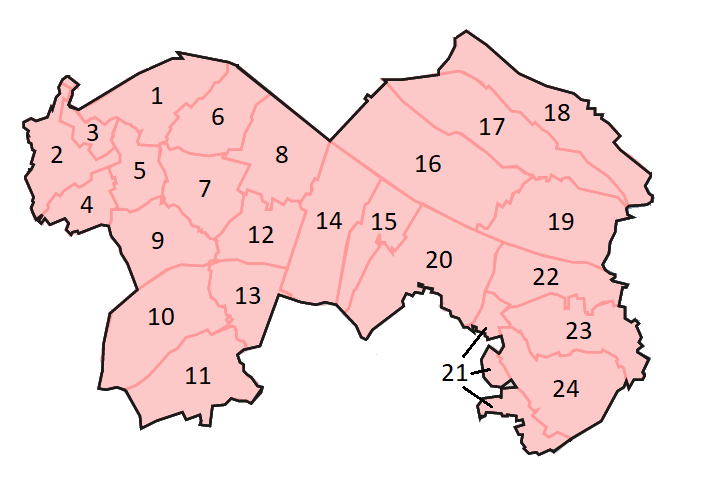
Granta deanery parishes. (1) Great Shelford (2) Harston (3) Hauxton (4) Newton (5) Little Shelford (6) Stapleford (7) Sawston (8) Babraham (9) Whittlesford (10) Duxford (11) Ickleton (12) Pampisford (13) Hinxton (14) Great & Little Abington (15) Hildersham (16) Balsham (17) West Wratting (18) Weston Colville (19) West Wickham (20) Linton (21) Bartlow (22) Horseheath (23) Shudy Camps (24) Castle Camps

- Benefice and Parish of Babraham (population 337): St Peter's Church (medieval)
- Benefice and Parish of Duxford (population 1,965)
  - St Peter's Church (medieval)
  - St John the Baptist's Church (medieval, closed 1874)
- Benefice of Granta Vale
  - Parish of Balsham (population 1,636): Holy Trinity Church (medieval)
  - Parish of Great and Little Abington (population 1,521)
    - St Mary the Virgin's Church, Great Abington (medieval)
    - St Mary's Church, Little Abington (medieval)
  - Parish of Hildersham (population 197): Holy Trinity Church (medieval)
  - Parish of West Wickham (population 403): St Mary's Church (medieval)
  - Parish of West Wratting (population 466): St Andrew's Church (medieval)
  - Parish of Weston Colville (population 437): St Mary's Church (medieval)
- Benefice and Parish of Great Shelford (population 4,667): St Mary the Virgin's Church (medieval)
- Benefice of Harston with Hauxton and Newton
  - Parish of Harston (population 1,664): All Saints' Church (medieval)
  - Parish of Hauxton (population 1,496): St Edmund's Church (medieval)
  - Parish of Newton (population 362): St Margaret of Antioch's Church (medieval)
- Benefice and Parish of Hinxton (population 328): SS Mary & John the Evangelist's Church (medieval)
- Benefice and Parish of Ickleton (population 797): St Mary Magdalene's Church (medieval)
- Benefice of Linton
  - Parish of Bartlow (population 222): St Mary's Church (medieval)
  - Parish of Castle Camps (population 645): All Saints' Church (medieval)
  - Parish of Horseheath (population 459): All Saints' Church (medieval)
  - Parish of Linton (population 4,423): St Mary's Church (medieval)
  - Parish of Shudy Camps (population 300): St Mary's Church (medieval)
- Benefice and Parish of Little Shelford (population 770): All Saints' Church (medieval)
- Benefice and Parish of Pampisford (population 344): St John the Baptist's Church (medieval)
- Benefice and Parish of Sawston (population 7,300): St Mary the Virgin's Church (medieval)
- Benefice and Parish of Stapleford (population 1,975): St Andrew's Church (medieval)
- Benefice and Parish of Whittlesford (population 1,856): SS Mary & Andrew's Church (medieval)

==== Deanery of North Stowe ====
- Benefice of 5Folds
  - Parish of Longstanton (population 5,712)
    - All Saints' Church (medieval)
    - Pathfinder Church, Northstowe (2021)
    - St Michael's Church, Longstanton (medieval, closed 1973)
  - Parish of Over (population 2,881): St Mary's Church (medieval)
  - Parish of Swavesey (population 2,749): St Andrew's Church (medieval)
  - Parish of Willingham (population 4,363): St Mary & All Saints' Church (medieval)
- Benefice and Parish of Bar Hill (population 3,899): Bar Hill Church Local Ecumenical Partnership (1967, rebuilt 1991)
- Benefice and Parish of Cottenham with Rampton (population 6,766)
  - All Saints' Church, Cottenham (medieval)
  - All Saints' Church, Rampton (medieval)
- Benefice and Parish of Girton (population 4,392)
  - St Andrew's Church (medieval)
  - St James's Chapel, Howes (medieval, closed 1558)
- Benefice and Parish of Histon (population 5,389)
  - St Andrew's Church (medieval)
  - St Etheldreda's Church (medieval, closed 1599)
- Benefice and Parish of Impington (population 3,061): St Andrew's Church (medieval)
- Benefice and Parish of Landbeach (population 952): All Saints' Church (medieval)
- Benefice and Parish of Madingley (population 181): St Mary Magdalene's Church (medieval)
- Benefice and Parish of Milton (population 4,176): All Saints' Church (medieval)
- Benefice and Parish of Oakington (population 1,497): St Andrew's Church (medieval)
- Benefice and Parish of Waterbeach (population 5,546): St John the Evangelist's Church (medieval)

==== Deanery of Shingay ====
- Benefice and Parish of Bassingbourn (population 3,251)
  - SS Peter & Paul's Church (medieval)
  - St Mary Magdalene's Church, Kneesworth (medieval, closed 1549)
- Benefice of Fowlmere, Foxton, Shepreth and Thriplow
  - Parish of Fowlmere (population 1,149): St Mary's Church (medieval)
  - Parish of Foxton (population 1,276): St Laurence's Church (medieval)
  - Parish of Shepreth (population 788): All Saints' Church (medieval)
  - Parish of Thriplow (population 1,231): St George's Church (medieval)
- Benefice and Parish of Melbourn (population 4,905): All Saints' Church (medieval)
- Benefice and Parish of Meldreth (population 2,074): Holy Trinity Church (medieval)
- Benefice of Orwell
  - Parish of Arrington (population 408): St Nicholas' Church (medieval)
  - Parish of Barrington (population 1,198): All Saints' Church (medieval)
  - Parish of Croydon (population 205)
    - All Saints' Church (medieval)
    - St Mary's Church, Clopton (medieval, closed C17th)
  - Parish of Orwell (population 1,138): St Andrew's Church (medieval)
  - Parish of Wimpole (population 288): St Andrew's Church (medieval)
- Benefice of Shingay
  - Parish of Abington Pigotts (population 147)
    - St Michael & All Angels' Church (medieval)
    - St Swithin's Chapel (medieval, closed C16th)
  - Parish of Guilden Morden with Tadlow (population 1,115)
    - St Mary's Church, Guilden Morden (medieval)
    - St Giles' Church, Tadlow (medieval, closed 2020s)
    - St James's Chapel, Redreth (medieval, closed C16th)
  - Parish of Litlington (population 851): St Catherine's Church (medieval)
  - Parish of Steeple Morden (population 1,194): SS Peter & Paul's Church (medieval)
  - Parish of Wendy with Shingay (population 94)
    - All Saints' Church, Wendy (medieval, rebuilt 1867, 1980s)
    - St Mary's Church, Shingay (medieval, rebuilt 1697, closed C18th)
- Benefice and Parish of Whaddon (population 517): St Mary's Church (medieval)

=== Archdeaconry of Huntingdon and Wisbech ===
==== Deanery of Ely ====
- Benefice of Ely
  - Parish of Chettisham (population 150): St Michael & All Angels' Church (medieval)
  - Parish of Ely (population 20,283)
    - St Mary's Church (medieval)
    - Christ Church North Ely (2016)
    - St Etheldreda's Church, Queen Adelaide (1883, closed 1968)
    - St Peter's Church, Prickwillow (1866, closed 2008)
  - Parish of Stuntney (population 300): Holy Cross Church (medieval, rebuilt 1876)
- [Proprietary Chapel of St Peter-in-Ely (outside parish structures) (1890)]
- Benefice of Isle of Ely Villages
  - Parish of Coveney (population 436): St Peter ad Vincula's Church (medieval)
  - Parish of Downham (population 2,587)
    - St Leonard's Church (medieval)
    - Holy Trinity Church, Pymoor (1865, closed 1981)
    - St Owen's Church, Downham Fen (1895, closed C20th)
  - Parish of Haddenham (population 3,474): Holy Trinity Church (medieval)
  - Parish of Little Thetford (population 715): St George's Church (medieval)
  - Parish of Mepal (population 961): St Mary's Church (medieval)
  - Parish of Stretham (population 2,090): St James's Church (medieval, rebuilt 1876)
  - Parish of Sutton (population 4,043): St Andrew's Church (medieval)
  - Parish of Wentworth (population 230): St Peter's Church (medieval)
  - Parish of Wilburton (population 1,067): St Peter's Church (medieval)
  - Parish of Witcham (population 464): St Martin's Church (medieval)
  - Parish of Witchford (population 2,498): St Andrew's Church (medieval)
- Benefice and Parish of Littleport (population 9,997)
  - St George's Church (medieval)
  - St Matthew's Church (1878, closed)
  - St John the Evangelist's Church, Little Ouse (1866, closed 1976)
- Benefice and Parish of Soham (population 12,321)
  - St Andrew's Church (medieval)
  - St Nicholas' Chapel, Barway (medieval, closed 1965)

==== Deanery of Fincham and Feltwell ====
- Benefice of Downham Market and Stradsett
  - Parish of Downham Market (population 9,682): St Edmund's Church (medieval)
  - Parish of Stradsett (population 87): St Mary's Church (medieval)
- Benefice of Grimshoe
  - Parish of Feltwell (population 3,023)
    - St Mary's Church (medieval)
    - St Nicholas' Church (medieval, closed 1864)
  - Parish of Hockwold with Wilton (population 1,304)
    - St James's Church, Wilton (medieval)
    - St Peter's Church, Hockwold (medieval, closed C19th/20th)
  - Parish of Northwold (population 993): St Andrew's Church (medieval)
  - Parish of Weeting (population 1,882)
    - St Mary's Church (medieval)
    - All Saints' Church (collapsed C17th)
- Benefice of Ouse Valley
  - Parish of Bexwell (population 82): St Mary's Church (medieval)
  - Parish of Crimplesham (population 263): St Mary's Church (medieval)
  - Parish of Denver (population 1,899): St Mary's Church (medieval)
  - Parish of Hilgay (population 1,371)
    - All Saints' Church, Hilgay (medieval)
    - St Mark's Church, Ten Mile Bank (1847)
  - Parish of Ryston with Roxham (population 40)
    - St Michael's Church, Ryston (medieval)
    - St Michael's Church, Roxham (abandoned C16th)
  - Parish of Southery (population 1,395): St Mary's Church (medieval, rebuilt 1858)
- Benefice of West Norfolk Priory
  - Parish of Fincham (population 514): St Martin's Church (medieval)
  - Parish of Marham (population 2,609): Holy Trinity Church (medieval)
  - Parish of Nordelph (population 966): Holy Trinity Church (1865, parish church 1909, closed, services in village hall)
  - Parish of Runcton Holme with South Runcton (population 624)
    - St James's Church, Runcton Holme (medieval)
    - St Andrew's Church, South Runcton (medieval, rebuilt 1839, closed 2010s)
  - Parish of Shouldham (population 651): All Saints' Church (medieval)
  - Parish of Shouldham Thorpe (population 150): St Mary the Virgin's Church (medieval, rebuilt 1858)
  - Parish of Stow Bardolph (population 882)
    - Holy Trinity Church (medieval)
    - St Peter's Mission Church, Stow Bridge (1908)
  - Parish of Tottenhill (population 200): St Botolph's Church (medieval)
  - Parish of Watlington (population 2,567): SS Peter & Paul's Church (medieval)
  - Parish of Wimbotsham (population 1,619): St Mary's Church (medieval)
  - Parish of Wormegay (population 399): St Michael & All Angels & Holy Cross Church (medieval)
- Benefice of Wissey Valley
  - Parish of Barton Bendish (population 207)
    - St Andrew's Church (medieval)
    - St Mary's Church (medieval, closed 1967)
    - All Saints' Church (medieval, demolished 1788)
  - Parish of Beachamwell with Shingham (population 348)
    - St Mary's Church, Beachamwell (medieval)
    - All Saints' Church, Beachamwell (medieval, collapsed 1688)
    - St John the Baptist's Church, Beachamwell (medieval, closed 1540s)
    - St Botolph's Church, Shingham (medieval, closed 1941)
  - Parish of Boughton (population 234): All Saints' Church (medieval)
  - Parish of Methwold (population 1,521): St George's Church (medieval)
  - Parish of Wereham (population 718): St Margaret of Antioch's Church (medieval)
  - Parish of West Dereham (population 471): St Andrew's Church (medieval)
  - Parish of Whittington (population 420): Christ Church (1874)
  - Parish of Wretton with Stoke Ferry (population 1,593)
    - All Saints' Church, Wretton (medieval)
    - All Saints' Church, Stoke Ferry (medieval, rebuilt 1848, closed)

==== Deanery of Huntingdon ====
- Benefice and Parish of East Leightonstone (population 7,787)
  - St Mary Magdalene's Church, Brampton (medieval)
  - All Saints' Church, Ellington (medieval)
  - All Saints' Church, Grafham (medieval)
- Benefice and Parish of Fen Drayton with Fenstanton (population 4,652)
  - St Mary's Church, Fen Drayton (medieval)
  - SS Peter & Paul's Church, Fenstanton (medieval)
- Benefice of Godmanchester and Hilton
  - Parish of Godmanchester (population 7,882): St Mary's Church (medieval)
  - Parish of Hilton (population 1,052): St Mary Magdalene's Church (medieval)
- Benefice of Hartford and Houghton with Wyton
  - Parish of Hartford (population 4,599): All Saints' Church (medieval)
  - Parish of Houghton with Wyton (population 3,471)
    - St Mary's Church, Houghton (medieval)
    - All Saints' Church, Wyton (medieval, closed 1980s)
- Benefice and Parish of Hemingford Abbots (population 624): St Margaret of Antioch's Church (medieval)
- Benefice and Parish of Hemingford Grey (population 2,964): St James's Church (medieval)
- Benefice and Parish of Huntingdon (population 20,847)
  - All Saints' Church (medieval)
  - St Mary's Church (medieval)
  - St Barnabas' Church (1969)
  - Cambridgeshire Deaf Church (2021)
  - Christ Church (2018, left to join AMiE)
  - Holy Trinity Church (medieval, closed C14th)
  - St Andrew's Church (medieval, closed C16th)
  - St Benedict's Church (medieval, closed 1668)
  - St Botolph's Church (medieval, closed Middle Ages)
  - St Clement's Church (medieval, closed C14th)
  - St Edmund's Church (medieval, closed 1312)
  - St George's Church (medieval, closed C17th)
  - St Germain's Church (medieval, closed C17th)
  - St John the Baptist's Church (medieval, closed 1667)
  - St Lawrence's Church (medieval, closed C13th)
  - St Martin's Church (medieval, closed 1343)
  - St Michael's Church (medieval, closed C16th)
  - St Nicholas' Church (medieval, closed Middle Ages)
  - St Peter's Church (medieval, closed C16th)
- Benefice of North Leightonstone
  - Parish of Abbots Ripton with Wood Walton (population 520)
    - St Andrew's Church, Abbots Ripton (medieval)
    - St Andrew's Church, Woodwalton (medieval, closed C20th)
  - Parish of Alconbury (population 3,512)
    - SS Peter & Paul's Church (medieval)
    - Alconbury Weald Church (2020s)
  - Parish of Buckworth (population 111): All Saints' Church (medieval)
  - Parish of Great Gidding (population 325)
    - St Michael's Church (medieval)
    - St John the Evangelist's Church, Little Gidding (medieval, rebuilt 1714)
    - St Andrew's Church, Steeple Gidding (medieval, closed)
  - Parish of Great Stukeley (population 705): St Bartholomew's Church (medieval)
  - Parish of Hamerton (population 95): All Saints' Church (medieval)
  - Parish of Kings Ripton (population 190): St Peter's Church (medieval)
  - Parish of Little Stukeley (population 748): St Martin's Church (medieval)
  - Parish of Upton (population 207)
    - St Margaret's Church (medieval)
    - All Saints' Church, Coppingford (medieval, closed C17th)
  - Parish of Winwick (population 95): All Saints' Church (medieval, historically in Northamptonshire)
- Benefice of South Leightonstone
  - Parish of Barham and Woolley (population 59)
    - St Giles' Church, Barham (medieval)
    - St Mary's Church, Woolley (medieval, closed 1960)
  - Parish of Covington (population 98): All Saints' Church (medieval)
  - Parish of Easton (population 161): St Peter's Church (medieval)
  - Parish of Kimbolton (population 1,360): St Andrew's Church (medieval)
  - Parish of Spaldwick (population 609): St James's Church (medieval)
  - Parish of Stow Longa (population 150): St Botolph's Church (medieval)
  - Parish of Tilbrook (population 244): All Saints' Church (medieval, historically in Bedfordshire)
- Benefice of West Leightonstone
  - Parish of Brington (population 260): All Saints' Church (medieval)
  - Parish of Bythorn (population 153): St Lawrence's Church (medieval)
  - Parish of Great Catworth (population 371): St Leonard's Church (medieval)
  - Parish of Keyston (population 179): St John the Baptist's Church (medieval)
  - Parish of Leighton Bromswold (population 185): St Mary's Church (medieval)
  - Parish of Molesworth (population 170): St Peter's Church (medieval)
  - Parish of Old Weston (population 222): St Swithin's Church (medieval)

St Nicholas' Church, Swineshead, was historically in this portion of the Diocese of Ely, but moved to the Diocese of St Albans when it was transferred from Huntingdonshire to Bedfordshire. St James the Great, Thurning, was historically in this area, but moved to the Diocese of Peterborough when the parish was transferred wholly to Northamptonshire (the parish church was always in Northamptonshire).

==== Deanery of March ====
- Benefice and Parish of Chatteris (population 11,166)
  - SS Peter & Paul's Church (medieval)
  - St Peter's Mission, Slade End, Chatteris (1906, closed c. 1980)
- Benefice of March
  - Parish of March St John (population 11,824): St John the Evangelist's Church (1872)
  - Parish of March St Mary (population 476)
    - St Mary the Virgin's Church, Westry (1874)
    - St Mary Magdalene's Chapel, West Fen (1891, closed C20th)
  - Parish of March St Peter (population 6,730): St Peter's Church (1880)
  - Parish of March St Wendreda (population 3,937): St Wendreda's Church (medieval)
- Benefice of Six Fen Churches
  - Parish of Doddington with Benwick (population 3,667)
    - St Mary's Church, Doddington (medieval)
    - St Mary's Church, Benwick (1854, demolished 1985, services continue in church room within village hall)
    - St James's Chapel, Benwick (medieval, closed C16th)
  - Parish of Manea (population 2,607): St Nicholas' Church (medieval, rebuilt 1875)
  - Parish of Upwell Christchurch (population 900): Christ Church (1864)
  - Parish of Welney (population 581): St Mary's Church (C17th, rebuilt 1848, in Norfolk)
  - Parish of Wimblington (population 2,387): St Peter's Church (1874)
- Benefice of Whittlesey, Pondersbridge and Coates
  - Parish of Coates (population 2,846)
    - Holy Trinity Church (1839)
    - Eastrea Chapel (medieval, closed c. C17th)
    - Eldernell Chapel (medieval, closed c. C17th)
  - Parish of Pondersbridge (population 408): St Thomas's Church (C19th, rebuilt 1869)
  - Parish of Whittlesey St Andrew (population 5,924)
    - St Andrew's Church (medieval)
    - St Guthlac's Mission Church, North Side (1902, closed C20th)
  - Parish of Whittlesey St Mary (population 8,709)
    - St Mary's Church (medieval)
    - St Stephen's Chapel, Angle Bridge (1877, closed C20th)

==== Deanery of St Ives ====
- Benefice of Bluntisham cum Earith with Colne and Holywell cum Needingworth
  - Parish of Bluntisham cum Earith (population 3,427)
    - St Mary's Church, Bluntisham (medieval)
    - St James's Chapel, Earith (medieval, closed 1571)
    - St Mary's Chapel, Earith Bridge (medieval, closed 1571)
  - Parish of Colne (population 952): St Helen's Church (medieval, rebuilt 1900)
  - Parish of Holywell cum Needingworth (population 2,338): St John the Baptist's Church, Holywell (medieval)
- Benefice and Parish of St Ives (population 16,678): All Saints' Church (medieval)
- Benefice of Somersham with Pidley and Oldhurst and Woodhurst
  - Parish of Old Hurst (population 255): St Peter's Church (medieval)
  - Parish of Pidley-cum-Fenton (population 414): All Saints' Church (medieval, rebuilt 1865)
  - Parish of Somersham (population 3,750): St John the Baptist's Church (medieval)
  - Parish of Woodhurst (population 419): St John the Baptist's Church (medieval)
- Benefice of The Ramseys and Upwood
  - Parish of Ramsey (population 7,125)
    - St Thomas a Becket's Church (medieval)
    - St Benet's Church, Ramsey Hollow (1877, closed C20th)
    - St Felix's Church, Ramsey Forty Foot (C19th/20th, closed C20th)
  - Parish of Ramsey St Mary's (population 1,513): St Mary's Church (1858)
  - Parish of Upwood (population 1,257)
    - St Peter's Church (medieval)
    - St James's Church, Little Raveley (medieval, redundant 1975)
- Benefice of Warboys with Broughton and Bury with Wistow
  - Parish of Broughton (population 253): All Saints' Church (medieval)
  - Parish of Bury (population 1,808): Holy Cross Church (medieval)
  - Parish of Warboys (population 4,513): St Mary Magdalene's Church (medieval)
  - Parish of Wistow (population 604): St John the Baptist's Church (medieval)

==== Deanery of St Neots ====
- Benefice of Buckden with the Offords
  - Parish of Buckden (population 2,880): St Mary's Church (medieval)
  - Parish of Offord D'Arcy with Offord Cluny (population 1,376)
    - All Saints' Church, Offord Cluny (medieval)
    - St Peter's Church, Offord D'Arcy (medieval, closed 1978)
- Benefice of Gamlingay and Everton
  - Parish of Everton (population 547): St Mary's Church (medieval) (in Bedfordshire)
  - Parish of Gamlingay (population 3,934)
    - St Mary's Church (medieval)
    - St George's Church, Hatley St George (medieval, closed c. 2010)
    - St Denis's Church, East Hatley (medieval, closed 1974)
- Benefice of Great Gransden and Abbotsley and Little Gransden and Waresley
  - Parish of Abbotsley (population 420): St Margaret of Antioch's Church (medieval)
  - Parish of Great Gransden (population 983): St Bartholomew's Church (medieval)
  - Parish of Little Gransden (population 290): SS Peter & Paul's Church (medieval)
  - Parish of Waresley (population 246): St James the Great's Church (medieval)
- Benefice and Parish of St Neots with Eynesbury (population 20,840)
  - St Mary's Church, St Neots (medieval)
  - St Mary's Church, Eynesbury (medieval)
- Benefice of The Paxtons with Diddington and Southoe
  - Parish of Diddington (population 86): St Laurence's Church (medieval)
  - Parish of Great Paxton (population 1,004): Holy Trinity Church (medieval)
  - Parish of Little Paxton (population 4,169): St James's Church (medieval)
  - Parish of Southoe (population 436): St Leonard's Church (medieval)
- Benefice of The Staughtons with Hail Weston
  - Parish of Great Staughton (population 2,597): St Andrew's Church (medieval)
  - Parish of Hail Weston (population 579): St Nicholas' Church (medieval)
  - Parish of Little Staughton (population 477): All Saints' Church (medieval) (in Bedfordshire)

==== Deanery of Wisbech Lynn Marshland ====
- Benefice and Parish of Clenchwarton (population 2,040): St Margaret's Church (medieval)
- Benefice of East Marshland
  - Parish of Terrington St John (population 929): St John the Baptist's Church (medieval)
  - Parish of Tilney All Saints (population 691): All Saints' Church (medieval)
  - Parish of Tilney St Lawrence (population 1,439): St Lawrence's Church (medieval)
  - Parish of Wiggenhall St Germans with St Mary the Virgin and Islington (population 1,700)
    - St Germain's Church, Wiggenhall St Germans (medieval)
    - St Mary the Virgin's Church, Wiggenhall St Mary the Virgin (medieval, closed 1981)
    - St Mary's Church, Islington (medieval, closed C20th)
    - St Peter's Church, Wiggenhall St Peter (medieval, closed early C20th)
  - Parish of Wiggenhall St Mary Magdalen (population 714): St Mary Magdalene's Church (medieval)
- Benefice of Leverington, Newton and Tydd St Giles
  - Parish of Leverington (population 3,537): St Leonard's Church (medieval)
  - Parish of Newton in the Isle (population 652)
    - St James's Church (medieval)
    - St Mary in the Marsh (medieval, closed C16th)
  - Parish of Tydd St Giles (population 1,222): St Giles' Church (medieval)
- Benefice and Parish of Outwell (population 2,247): St Clement's Church (medieval)
- Benefice and Parish of Terrington St Clement (population 4,562): St Clement's Church (medieval)
- Benefice of The Fen Orchards
  - Parish of Elm (population 2,363): All Saints' Church (medieval)
  - Parish of Emneth (population 4,935)
    - St Edmund's Church (medieval)
    - St James's Church, Marshland St James (1837, closed 2002)
  - Parish of Friday Bridge with Coldham (population 1,500)
    - St Mark's Church, Friday Bridge (1860)
    - St Etheldreda's Church, Coldham (1876, closed C20th)
- Benefice and Parish of Upwell (population 2,991): St Peter's Church (medieval)
- Benefice and Parish of Walpole St Peter with Walpole St Andrew (population 3,406)
  - St Peter's Church, Walpole St Peter (medieval)
  - St Andrew's Church, Walpole St Andrew (medieval, closed)
  - St Helen's Mission Church, Walpole Cross Keys (1881, closed 1970s)
  - St Edmund's Church, Walpole Highway (1844, closed 1984)
- Benefice and Parish of Walsoken (population 8,766): All Saints' Church (medieval)
- Benefice and Parish of West Walton (population 1,890)
  - St Mary's Church (medieval)
  - St Paul's Church, Walton Highway (1850, closed)
- Benefice and Parish of Wisbech St Augustine (population 8,145): St Augustine's Church (1868)
- Benefice of Wisbech St Mary and Guyhirn with Ring's End and Gorefield and Southea with Murrow and Parson Drove
  - Parish of Gorefield (population 1,418): St Paul's Church (1870)
  - Parish of Southea with Murrow and Parson Drove (population 2,469)
    - Emmanuel Church, Parson Drove (1873)
    - St John the Baptist's Church, Parson Drove (medieval, closed 1974)
    - Corpus Christi Church, Murrow (medieval, rebuilt 1857, closed c. 2005)
  - Parish of Wisbech St Mary and Guyhirn with Ring's End (population 3,080)
    - St Mary's Church, Wisbech St Mary (medieval)
    - Guyhirn Chapel (medieval, rebuilt 1660, closed 1960)
    - St Mary Magdalene's Church, Guyhirn (1878, closed C21st)
- Benefice and Parish of Wisbech St Peter and St Paul (population 8,753)
  - SS Peter & Paul's Church (medieval)
  - Octagon Chapel (1831, closed 1946)

==== Deanery of Yaxley ====
- Benefice of Alwalton and Chesterton
  - Parish of Alwalton (population 3,898): St Andrew's Church (medieval)
  - Parish of Chesterton (population 148): St Michael's Church (medieval)
- Benefice and Parish of Elton (population 681): All Saints' Church (medieval)
- Benefice of Fen Edge
  - Parish of Glatton (population 264): St Nicholas' Church (medieval)
  - Parish of Holme with Conington (population 880)
    - St Giles' Church, Holme (medieval, rebuilt 1862)
    - All Saints' Church, Conington (medieval, closed)
  - Parish of Sawtry (population 5,893)
    - All Saints' Church (medieval, rebuilt 1880)
    - St Andrew's Church (medieval, closed 1879)
    - St Mary's Church, Sawtry Judith (medieval, closed C16th)
- Benefice and Parish of Fletton (population 8,106): St Margaret's Church (medieval)
- Benefice and Parish of Hampton (population 17,920): Christ the Servant King Church (c. 2014)
- Benefice and Parish of Orton Goldhay and Orton Malborne (population 11,396): Christ Church Local Ecumenical Partnership, Orton Goldhay (c. 2000)
- Benefice of Stanground and Farcet
  - Parish of Farcet (population 1,553): St Mary's Church (medieval)
  - Parish of Stanground (population 15,843)
    - St John the Baptist's Church (medieval)
    - St Michael & All Angels' Church (C20th)
- Benefice of Stilton with Denton and Caldecote and Folkesworth with Morborne and Haddon
  - Parish of Folkesworth (population 844): St Helen's Church (medieval)
  - Parish of Haddon (population 62): St Mary's Church (medieval)
  - Parish of Morborne (population 27): All Saints' Church (medieval)
  - Parish of Stilton with Denton and Caldecote (population 2,367)
    - St Mary Magdalene's Church, Stilton (medieval)
    - All Saints' Church, Denton (medieval, closed 1960s)
    - St Mary Magdalene's Church, Caldecote (medieval, closed 1970s)
- Benefice of The Ortons
  - Parish of Orton Longueville with Bottlebridge (population 3,769)
    - Holy Trinity Church, Orton Longueville (medieval)
    - All Saints' Church, Botolph Bridge (medieval, closed 1695)
  - Parish of Orton Waterville (population 3,870): St Mary's Church (medieval)
- Benefice and Parish of Woodston (population 7,227)
  - St Augustine of Canterbury's Church (medieval, rebuilt 1844, closed 2022)
  - Mission Church?
- Benefice and Parish of Yaxley (population 9,387): St Peter's Church (medieval)

== Diocesan news publications ==
Publication	From	To
Ely Diocesan Remembrancer	May 1885	December 1915
Ely Diocesan Gazette	January 1916	November 1989
Ely Ensign	December 1989	January 2007
eLife Diocesan Newsletter	January 2009	Present

== Progression of church numbers ==
Period	Additions	Closures	Total at end
Medieval	[364 medieval churches and chapelries]		364
C13th		Huntingdon St Lawrence, Quy?	362
C14th		Cambridge All SS by the Castle, Huntingdon St Botolph?, Huntingdon St Clement, Huntingdon St Edmund, Huntingdon St Martin, Huntingdon Trinity	356
C15th		Cambridge St John, Huntingdon St Nicholas?	354
C16th		Abington Pigotts St Swithin, Barnwell, Beachamwell St John, Benwick, Cambridge St Anne, Childerley, Earith, Earith Bridge, Haslingfield St Mary, Histon St Etheldreda, Howes, Huntingdon St Andrew, Huntingdon St Michael, Huntingdon St Peter, Kneesworth, Newton-in-the-Isle St Mary, Reach, Redreth, Roxham, Sawtry Judith, Silverley, Willingham-next-Carlton	332
C17th	Welney	Beachamwell All SS, Botolph Bridge, Burwell St Andrew, Clopton, Coppingford, Eastrea, Eldernell, Huntingdon St Benedict, Huntingdon St George, Huntingdon St Germain, Huntingdon St John, Weeting All SS	321
C18th		Barton Bendish All SS, Fulbourn All SS, Shingay	318
1830s	Cambridge Christ Ch, Coates, Marshland St James, Wisbech Octagon	Cambridge St Andrew the Less	321
1840s	Cambridge St Paul, Ten Mile Bank, Walpole Highway	Ashley St John	323
1850s	Benwick, Lode, Pondersbridge?, Ramsey St Mary, Walton Highway		328
1860s	Cambridge St Barnabas, Cambridge St Luke, Cambridge St Matthew, Christchurch, Friday Bridge, Little Ouse, Nordelph, Prickwillow, Pymoor, Wisbech St Augustine	Feltwell St Nicholas	337
1870s	Angle Bridge, Cambridge St John Wellington St, Cambridge St Mark, Coldham, Gorefield, Guyhirn St Mary Magdalene, Littleport St Matthew, March St John, March St Mary, Parson Drove Emmanuel, Ramsey Hollow, Saxon Street, Whittington, Wimblington	Duxford St John, Sawtry St Andrew	349
1880s	March St Peter, Queen Adelaide, Walpole Cross Keys		352
1890s	Cambridge St Augustine, Cambridge St John, Cambridge St Philip, Downham Fen, Ely St Peter, Six Mile Bottom, West Fen		359
1900s	Chatteris St Peter, North Side, Ramsey Forty Foot?, Stanground St Michael?, Stow Bridge, Welches Dam	Swaffham Prior SS Cyriac & Julitta	364
1930s	Cambridge St George, Cambridge St Martin	Hockwold?, Steeple Gidding?, Walpole St Andrew?, Wiggenhall St Peter?	362
1940s	Cambridge St Stephen	Cambridge St John Wellington St, Shingham, Wisbech Octagon	360
1950s	Cambridge Good Shepherd, Cambridge Holy Cross?, Cambridge St James	Cambridge St Michael?, Cambridge St Peter?, Littleport St Matthew?, Ramsey Hollow?, West Fen?	358
1960s	Bar Hill, Huntingdon St Barnabas	Angle Bridge?, Barton Bendish St Mary, Barway, Denton, Downham Fen?, Guyhirn, Queen Adelaide, Ramsey Forty Foot?, Walton Highway?, Woolley	350
1970s		Caldecote, Cambridge All SS, Conington?, East Hatley, Islington?, Little Ouse, Little Raveley, Longstanton St Michael, North Side?, Offord D'Arcy, Papworth St Agnes, Parson Drove St John, Walpole Cross Keys, Welches Dam?, Woodwalton?	335
1980s	Cambridge St Thomas	Chatteris St Peter, Coldham?, Pymoor, Saxon Street, Stoke Ferry?, Walpole Highway, Wiggenhall St Mary the Virgin, Wyton	328
1990s	Cambourne	Cambridge Holy Sepulchre, Stanground St Michael?	327
2000s	Orton Goldhay	Guyhirn St Mary Magdalene, Marshland St James, Murrow, Prickwillow	324
2010s	Ely Christ Ch, Hampton, Huntingdon Christ Ch, Orchard Park	Cambridge St Stephen, Hatley St George, South Runcton	325
2020s	Alconbury Weald, Deaf Church, Northstowe	Huntingdon Christ Ch, Tadlow, Woodston	325

== Dedications ==
=== Medieval churches (and chapelries) ===
- All Saints: Barrington, Barton Bendish, Beachamwell, Botolph Bridge, Boughton, Brington, Broughton, Buckworth, Cambridge (x2), Castle Camps, Conington (Hunts), Coppingford, Cottenham, Covington, Croydon, Denton, Ellington, Elm, Elton, Fulbourn, Grafham, Hamerton, Harston, Hartford, Haslingfield, Hilgay, Horseheath, Huntingdon, Kirtling, Knapwell, Landbeach, Little Shelford, Lolworth, Longstanton, Melbourn, Milton, Morborne, [Newmarket], Offord Cluny, Pidley-cum-Fenton, Rampton, St Ives, Sawtry, Shepreth, Shouldham, Silverley, Stoke Ferry, Teversham, Thriplow, Tilbrook, Tilney All Saints, Walsoken, Weeting, Willingham (near Carlton), Winwick, Woodditton, Wretton, Wyton
- All Saints & St Andrew: Kingston
- Assumption of Mary: Harlton, West Wickham
- Corpus Christi: Murrow
- Holy Cross: Bury, Stuntney, Yelling
- Holy Sepulchre: Cambridge
- Holy Trinity: Balsham, Bottisham, Cambridge, Elsworth, Ely Cathedral, Great Paxton, Haddenham, Hildersham, Huntingdon, Marham, Meldreth, Orton Longueville, Stow Bardolph
- St Andrew: Abbots Ripton, Alwalton, Barton Bendish, Burwell, Cambridge (x2), Caxton, Cherry Hinton, Chesterton (Cambs), Girton, Grantchester, Great Staughton, Histon, Huntingdon, Isleham, Kimbolton, Northwold, Oakington, Orwell, Sawtry, Soham, South Runcton, Stapleford, Steeple Gidding, Sutton, Swavesey, Toft, Walpole St Andrew, West Dereham, West Wratting, Whittlesey, Whittlesford, Wimpole, Witchford, Wood Walton
- St Anne: Cambridge
- St Augustine: Burrough Green, Woodston
- St Bartholomew: Great Gransden, Great Stukeley
- St Benedict: Cambridge, Huntingdon
- St Botolph: Cambridge, Graveley, Huntingdon, Shingham, Stow Longa, Tottenhill
- St Catherine: Litlington, Newton-in-the-Isle
- St Clement: Cambridge, Huntingdon, Outwell, Terrington St Clement
- SS Cyriac & Julitta: Swaffham Prior
- St Denis: East Hatley
- St Edmund: Downham Market, Emneth, Hauxton, Huntingdon
- St Edward the Martyr: Cambridge
- St Etheldreda: Histon, Impington, Reach
- St George: Hatley St George, Huntingdon, Littleport, Methwold, Thetford
- St Germain: Huntingdon
- St Giles: Barham, Cambridge, Holme, Tydd St Giles
- St Helen: Bourn, Colne, Folksworth, Little Eversden
- St James: Benwick, Croxton, Earith, Hemingford Grey, Howes, Little Paxton, Little Raveley, Newton, Redreth, Runcton Holme, Spaldwick, Stretham, [Thurning], Waresley, Wilton
- St John the Baptist: Ashley (chapel), Beachamwell, Cambridge, Duxford, Holywell-cum-Needingworth, Huntingdon, Keyston, Pampisford, Parson Drove, Reach, Somersham, Stanground, Tadlow, Terrington St John, Wistow, Woodhurst
- St John the Evangelist: Little Gidding, Little Wilbraham, Waterbeach
- St Lawrence: Bythorn, Diddington, Foxton, Huntingdon, Tilney St Lawrence, Wicken
- St Leonard: Downham, Great Catworth, Leverington, Southoe
- St Margaret: Abbotsley, Chippenham, Clenchwarton, Fletton, Hemingford Abbots, Little Staughton, Upton, Wereham
- St Martin: Fincham, Huntingdon, Little Stukeley, Witcham
- St Mary: Ashley, Bartlow, Barton Bendish, Beachamwell, Bexwell, Bluntisham, Brinkley, Buckden, Burwell, Cambridge, Cheveley, Childerley, Clopton, Comberton, Conington (Cambs), Crimplesham, Denver, Doddington, Dullingham, Earith Bridge, Ely, Everton, Eynesbury, Farcet, Feltwell, Fen Ditton, Fen Drayton, Fordham, Fowlmere, Gamlingay, Godmanchester, Great Abington, Great Eversden, Great Shelford, Guilden Morden, Haddon, Hardwick, Haslingfield, Hinxton, Houghton, Huntingdon, Ickleton, Islington, Leighton Bromswold, Linton, Little Abington, Longstowe, Mepal, Newton-in-the-Isle, Orton Waterville, Over, St Neots, Sawston, Sawtry Judith, Shingay, Shouldham Thorpe, Shudy Camps, Southery, Stow, Stradsett, Swaffham Bulbeck, Swaffham Prior, Weeting, Wendy, West Walton, Westley Waterless, Weston Colville, Whaddon, Whittlesey, Wiggenhall St Mary the Virgin, Wimbotsham, Wisbech, Woolley
- St Mary Magdalene: Brampton, Caldecote (Hunts), Hilton, Kneesworth, Madingley, Stilton, Stourbridge, Warboys
- St Matthew: Willingham
- St Michael: Abington Pigotts, Caldecote (Cambs), Cambridge, Chesterton (Hunts), Chettisham, Great Gidding, Huntingdon, Longstanton, Roxham, Ryston, Toseland
- St Michael & Holy Cross: Wormegay
- St Nicholas: Arrington, Barway, Feltwell, Glatton, Great Wilbraham, Hail Weston, Huntingdon, Kennett, [Landwade], Manea, Quy, [Swineshead], Trumpington
- St Pandionia: Eltisley
- St Peter: Babraham, Barton, Boxworth, Cambridge (x2), Carlton, Coton, Duxford, Easton, Hockwold, Horningsea, Huntingdon, Kings Ripton, Molesworth, Offord D'Arcy, Old Hurst, Papworth Everard, Papworth St Agnes, Snailwell, Stetchworth, Upwell, Upwood, Walpole St Peter, Wentworth, Wiggenhall St Peter, Wilburton, Wisbech, Yaxley
- St Peter-ad-Vincula: Coveney
- SS Peter & Paul: Alconbury, Bassingbourn, Chatteris, Dry Drayton, Fenstanton, Little Gransden, Steeple Morden, Watlington
- St Radegund: Cambridge
- St Swithin: Abington Pigotts, Old Weston
- St Thomas Becket: Ramsey
- St Vigor: Fulbourn
- St Wendreda: March
- No dedication/dedication unknown: Eastrea, Eldernell, Guyhirn

=== Post-medieval churches ===
- All Saints: Cambridge (1863)
- Christ Church: Cambridge (1837), Christchurch (1864), Ely (2016), Huntingdon (2018), Whittington (1874), Orton Goldhay (c. 2000)
- Christ the Redeemer: Cambridge (C20th)
- Christ the Servant King: Hampton (2014)
- Emmanuel: Parson Drove (1873)
- Good Shepherd: Cambridge (1958)
- Holy Cross: Cambridge (c. 1950)
- Holy Trinity: Coates (1839), Nordelph (1865), Pymoor (1865), Saxon Street (1877)
- Holy Trinity & St Etheldreda: Reach (1861)
- Pathfinder Church: Northstowe (2021)
- St Augustine: Cambridge (1898), Wisbech (1868)
- St Barnabas: Cambridge (1869), Huntingdon (1969)
- St Benedict: Ramsey Hollow (1877)
- St Eanswyth: Welches Dam (1909)
- St Edmund: Walpole Highway (1844)
- St Etheldreda: Coldham (1876), Queen Adelaide (1883)
- St Felix of Burgundy: Ramsey Forty Foot (C19th/20th)
- St George: Chesterton (Cambs) (1938), Six Mile Bottom (1890s)
- St Guthlac: North Side (1902)
- St Helen: Walpole Cross Keys (1881)
- St James: Cambridge (1955), Lode (1853), Marshland (1837)
- St John the Evangelist: Cambridge (x2) (1874, 1891), Little Ouse (1866), March (1872), Orchard Park (2013)
- St Luke: Cambridge (1863)
- St Mark: Friday Bridge (1860), Newnham (1870), Ten Mile Bank (1864)
- St Martin: Cambridge (1932)
- St Mary: Benwick (1854), March (1873), Ramsey St Mary (1858), Welney (C17th)
- St Mary Magdalene: Guyhirn (1878), March (1891)
- St Matthew: Cambridge (1866), Littleport (1878)
- St Michael: Stanground (C20th)
- St Owen: Downham Fen (1895)
- St Paul: Cambridge (1841), Gorefield (1870), Walton Highway (1850)
- St Peter: Chatteris (1906), Ely (1890), March (1880), Prickwillow (1866), Stow Bridge (1908), Wimblington (1874)
- St Philip: Cambridge (1889)
- St Stephen: Angle Bridge (1877), Cambridge (c. 1940)
- St Thomas: Cambridge (1980), Pondersbridge (C19th)
- No dedication/dedication unknown: Alconbury Weald (2020s), Bar Hill (1967), Cambourne (1999), Deaf Church (2021), Wisbech (1831)

== Benefices by population ==
Benefice	Population	Churches	Clergy (Oct 2025)
Wisbech Walsoken // Wisbech St Aug // Wisb SS Peter & Paul	25,664	3	1 Joint Priest-in-Charge, 1 Joint NSM (Wisbech)
Peterborough Fletton // Peterboro Stanground and Farcet	25,502	4	Vacant
March	22,967	4	1 Team Rector, 1 Team Vicar, 1 NSM
Huntingdon	20,847	4	Vacant, 1 Curate, 1 NSM
St Neots with Eynesbury	20,840	2	1 Team Rector
Ely	20,733	4	1 Team Rector, 1 Team Vicar, 1 NSM
Cambridge Ascension	18,783	3	1 Team Rector, 1 Team Vicar
Isle of Ely Villages	18,565	11	Vacant (x2), 1 NSM
Peterborough Hampton	17,920	1	1 Vicar, 1 Curate
Whittlesey, Pondersbridge and Coates	17,887	4	Vacant
St Ives	16,678	1	1 Vicar
5Folds	15,705	5	1 Team Rector, 1 Team Vicar, 1 BMO Minister, 1 NSM
Cambridge Chesterton Good Shepherd	15,578	2	1 Vicar, 3 Curates
Alwalton & Chesterton // Peterb Orton Goldhay & Orton Malborne	15,442	3	1 Joint Vicar/Priest-in-Charge
Peterborough The Ortons (// Peterborough Woodston)	14,866	2	1 Vicar
The Fen Orchards // Outwell // Upwell (Orchard Welle)	14,036	5	Vacant (since 2020/22), 1 NSM
Cambridge Trumpington	13,343	1	Vacant, 1 NSM
Grimshoe // Wissey Valley	12,714	12	Vacant, 2 NSMs
Lordsbridge	12,695	11	2 Team Vicars, 2 Curates, 3 NSMs
Leverington, Newton etc // Wisbech St Mary, Gorefield etc	12,378	6	1 Joint Rector/Vicar
Soham	12,321	1	1 Rector, 1 Curate
Cambourne	12,088	1	Vacant (served by a Baptist minister)
Cambridge St John the Evangelist	11,385	1	1 Vicar, 2 NSMs, 1 Hon. Curate
West Norfolk Priory	11,181	12	1 Rector
Chatteris	11,166	1	1 Vicar
Six Fen Churches	10,142	6	1 Rector
Cambridge Cherry Hinton	10,099	1	1 Vicar, 1 Curate, 1 NSM
Littleport	9,997	1	1 Vicar
The Ramseys and Upwood	9,895	3	1 Rector, 1 Curate
Downham Market and Stradsett (under Bishop of Richborough)	9,769	2	1 Rector
Cambridge Chesterton St Andrew	9,535	1	1 Vicar, 3 NSMs
Yaxley	9,387	1	1 Vicar
Cambridge Chesterton St George	9,214	1	1 Vicar, 1 NSM
Godmanchester and Hilton	8,934	2	1 Vicar
Histon // Impington	8,450	2	1 Joint Vicar, 3 Joint Curates
Papworth	8,396	15	1 Team Rector, 1 NSM
Hartford and Houghton with Wyton	8,070	2	1 Rector, 1 Curate, 2 NSMs
East Leightonstone	7,787	3	1 Vicar, 1 Curate
Babraham // Sawston	7,637	2	1 Joint Vicar, 1 Joint Curate, 1 Joint Hon. Curate
Clenchwarton // Walpole // West Walton	7,336	3	1 Joint Rector
Warboys with Broughton and Bury with Wistow	7,178	4	1 Rector
Fen Edge	7,037	3	1 Vicar
Melbourn // Meldreth	6,979	2	1 Joint Vicar
Cambridge St Martin	6,891	1	1 Vicar, 2 NSMs
Cottenham with Rampton	6,766	2	1 Rector
Burwell with Reach	6,753	2	1 Vicar, 1 Curate, 1 NSM
Bluntisham cum Earith, Colne, Holywell cum Needingworth	6,717	3	1 Vicar, 1 NSM
Cambridge St James	6,630	1	Vacant, 1 Curate
Three Rivers	6,626	5	1 Rector
North Leightonstone	6,508	12	1 Priest-in-Charge, 0.5 Curate, 1 Dioc. Pioneer Minister
Landbeach // Waterbeach	6,498	2	1 Joint Priest-in-Charge, 1 Joint Curate, 1.5 Joint NSMs
Linton	6,049	5	1 Team Rector, 1 Team Vicar, 1 Curate
Cambridge Christ Church (under Bishop of Ebbsfleet)	5,758	1	1 Vicar, 4 Curates
The Paxtons with Diddington and Southoe	5,695	4	Vacant (will include the Offords)
Cambridge St Paul	5,665	1	1 Vicar, 1 Curate, 1 NSM
Anglesey	5,576	5	1 Vicar, 1 Curate
East Marshland	5,473	5	Vacant (since 2022)
Fen Ditton // Horningsea // Teversham	5,188	3	1 Joint Rector/Vicar, 1 Joint Curate
Fulbourn // Great Wilbraham // Little Wilbraham	5,188	4	1 Joint Rector/Vicar
Ouse Valley	5,050	7	1 Rector
Somersham with Pidley & Oldhurst & Woodhurst	4,838	4	Vacant
Great Shelford	4,667	1	1 Vicar, 1 Curate, 2 NSMs
Granta Vale	4,660	7	1 Rector, 1 Curate
Fen Drayton with Fenstanton	4,652	2	1 Rector, 1 Curate
Girton // Madingley	4,573	2	1 Joint Rector/Vicar, 1 Joint Curate, 1 Joint NSM
Terrington St Clement (under Bishop of Ebbsfleet)	4,562	1	1 Vicar
Gamlingay and Everton	4,481	2	1 Rector
Cambridge Holy Cross	4,452	1	1 Vicar
Fowlmere, Foxton, Shepreth and Thriplow	4,444	4	1 Rector
Buckden with the Offords	4,256	2	Vacant (Offords to be transferred, see above)
South Leightonstone // West Leightonstone	4,221	14	1 Joint Rector/Vicar, 0.5 Curate (West)
Milton	4,176	1	1 Priest-in-Charge, 0.5 NSM
Elton // Stilton, Folksworth, Morborne and Haddon	3,981	5	1 Joint Rector/Vicar
Cambridge St Matthew (under Bishop of Ebbsfleet)	3,930	1	1 Vicar, 1 Curate
Bar Hill	3,899	1	1 Minister, 1 Curate
Bassingbourn // Whaddon	3,768	2	1 Joint Vicar
The Staughtons with Hail Weston	3,653	3	Vacant
Hemingford Abbots // Hemingford Grey	3,588	2	1 Joint Rector/Vicar, 1 Joint Curate
Grantchester // Cambridge Newnham	3,584	2	1 Joint Vicar, 1 Joint Curate, 1 Curate, 2 Joint NSMs
Harston with Hauxton and Newton	3,522	3	1 Vicar
Duxford // Hinxton // Ickleton // Pampisford	3,434	4	1 Joint Rector/Vicar (D, H, L only), 1 Joint NSM
Shingay	3,401	5	1 Rector, 1 NSM
Cambridge St Barnabas	3,287	1	1 Vicar, 1 Curate
Orwell	3,237	5	1 Rector
Cambridge St Andrew the Great (under Bishop of Ebbsfleet)	3,193	1	1 Vicar, 2 Curates
Ashley // Cheveley // Kirtling // Woodditton	2,877	4	1 Joint Rector/Vicar
Raddesley	2,513	6	1 Rector
Cambridge St Botolph	2,082	1	1 Rector, 1 NSM
Stapleford	1,975	1	1 Vicar, 1 Curate
Great & Little Gransden, Abbotsley, Waresley	1,939	4	1 Rector, 1 Curate, 1 Hon. Curate
Cambridge Holy Trinity	1,883	1	1 Priest-in-Charge, 3 Curates
Whittlesford	1,856	1	1 Vicar
Oakington	1,497	1	1 Vicar
Cambridge St Mary the Less	1,366	1	1 Vicar, 1 Curate, 1 NSM
Cambridge St Edward	1,339	1	1 Chaplain, 1 Curate
Cambridge St Benedict	988	1	1 Vicar, 1 NSM
Wicken	841	1	Vacant
Little Shelford (under Bishop of Ebbsfleet)	770	1	1 Rector, 1 Curate
Cambridge St Mary the Great	730	1	1 Vicar, 2 Curates, 2 NSMs
Cambridge St Clement	469	1	1 Vicar
[Ely Cathedral	(44)	1	1 Dean, 3 Canons Residentiary]
[Ely St Peter	N/A	1	1 Curate-in-Charge]

There are a total of 100 benefices (counting multiple benefices held simultaneously by the same cleric as one).

== Deaneries by population ==
Deanery	Population	Churches	Clergy (Oct 2025)	Popn. per stip. cl.
Yaxley	94,135	19	1 Rector, 5 Vicars, 1 Curate	13,448
Cambridge North	76,830	16	2 Rectors, 10 Vicars, 13 Curates, 6 NSMs	3,073
Wisbech Lynn Marshland	69,449	23	2 Rectors, 1 Vicar, 1 Priest-in-Charge, 2 NSMs	17,362
Cambridge South	68,542	16	1 Rector, 8 Vicars, 1 P-in-C, 1 Chapl, 15 Curates, 12 NSMs, 1 Hon. Curate	2,636
Huntingdon	64,607	41	4 Rectors, 2 Vicars, 1 Priest-in-Charge, 6 Curates, 1 Pioneer Min, 3 NSMs	4,615
March	62,162	15	2 Rectors, 2 Vicars, 1 NSM	15,541
Ely	61,616	17	2 Rectors, 2 Vicars, 1 Curate, 2 NSMs	12,323
North Stowe	51,564	16	3 Rectors, 3 Vicars, 2 Priests-in-Charge, 2 Ministers, 6 Curates, 4 NSMs	3,223
St Ives	45,306	15	2 Rectors, 2 Vicars, 1 Curate, 1 NSM	9,061
St Neots	40,864	17	3 Rectors, 1 Curate, 1 Hon. Curate	10,216
Fincham and Feltwell	38,714	31	3 Rectors, 2 NSMs	12,905
Granta	34,570	25	4 Rectors, 6 Vicars, 6 Curates, 3 NSMs, 1 Hon. Curate	2,161
Bourn	33,179	27	1 Rector, 2 Vicars, 2 Curates, 4 NSMs	6,636
Fordham and Quy	30,374	27	4 Rectors, 2 Vicars, 2 Curates, 1 NSM	3,797
Shingay	21,829	18	3 Rectors, 2 Vicars, 1 NSM	4,366
Totals	793,741	323	147 stipendiary clergy, 45 non-stipendiary	average: 5,400

== Archdeaconries by population ==
Archdeaconry	Population	Churches	Clergy (Nov 2025)	Popn. per stip. cl.
Huntingdon and Wisbech	476,853	178	46 stipendiary, 12 non-stipendiary	10,366
Cambridge	316,888	145	101 stipendiary, 33 non-stipendiary	3,138

== Non-parochial posts held by ordained clergy in the Ely region ==
- Diocesan Central Office: 1 Bishop, 2 Archdeacons, 1 Bishop's Chaplain, 1 Bishop's Adviser for Pioneer Ministry
- Cambridge University Faculty of Divinity: 1 Fellow
- Christ's College, Cambridge: 1 Chaplain
- Clare College, Cambridge: 1 Dean
- Downing College, Cambridge: 1 Chaplain
- Emmanuel College, Cambridge: 1 Dean
- Gonville and Caius College, Cambridge: 1 Dean
- Girton College, Cambridge: 1 Chaplain
- Jesus College, Cambridge: 1 Dean
- King's College, Cambridge: 1 Dean, 1 Chaplain
- Magdalene College, Cambridge: 1 Chaplain
- Newnham and Selwyn Colleges, Cambridge: 1 Chaplain
- Pembroke College, Cambridge: 1 Dean
- Peterhouse, Cambridge: 1 Dean, 1 Assistant Chaplain
- Queens' College, Cambridge: 1 Dean, 1 Chaplain
- Ridley Hall, Cambridge: 1 Principal, 1 Vice-Principal, 1 Academic Dean, 1 Chaplain, 2 Tutors
- St Catharine's College, Cambridge: 1 Chaplain
- St John's College, Cambridge: 1 Dean (also Canon Theologian at Eds & Ips Cathedral), 1 Chaplain
- Sidney Sussex College, Cambridge: 1 Chaplain
- Trinity College, Cambridge: 1 Dean, 1 Chaplain
- Trinity Hall, Cambridge: 1 Dean

== See also ==
- Lands and Liberties of the Church at Ely
