= South Cambridgeshire Rural District =

Former local government area in the UK

Coordinates: 52.096°N 0.087°E

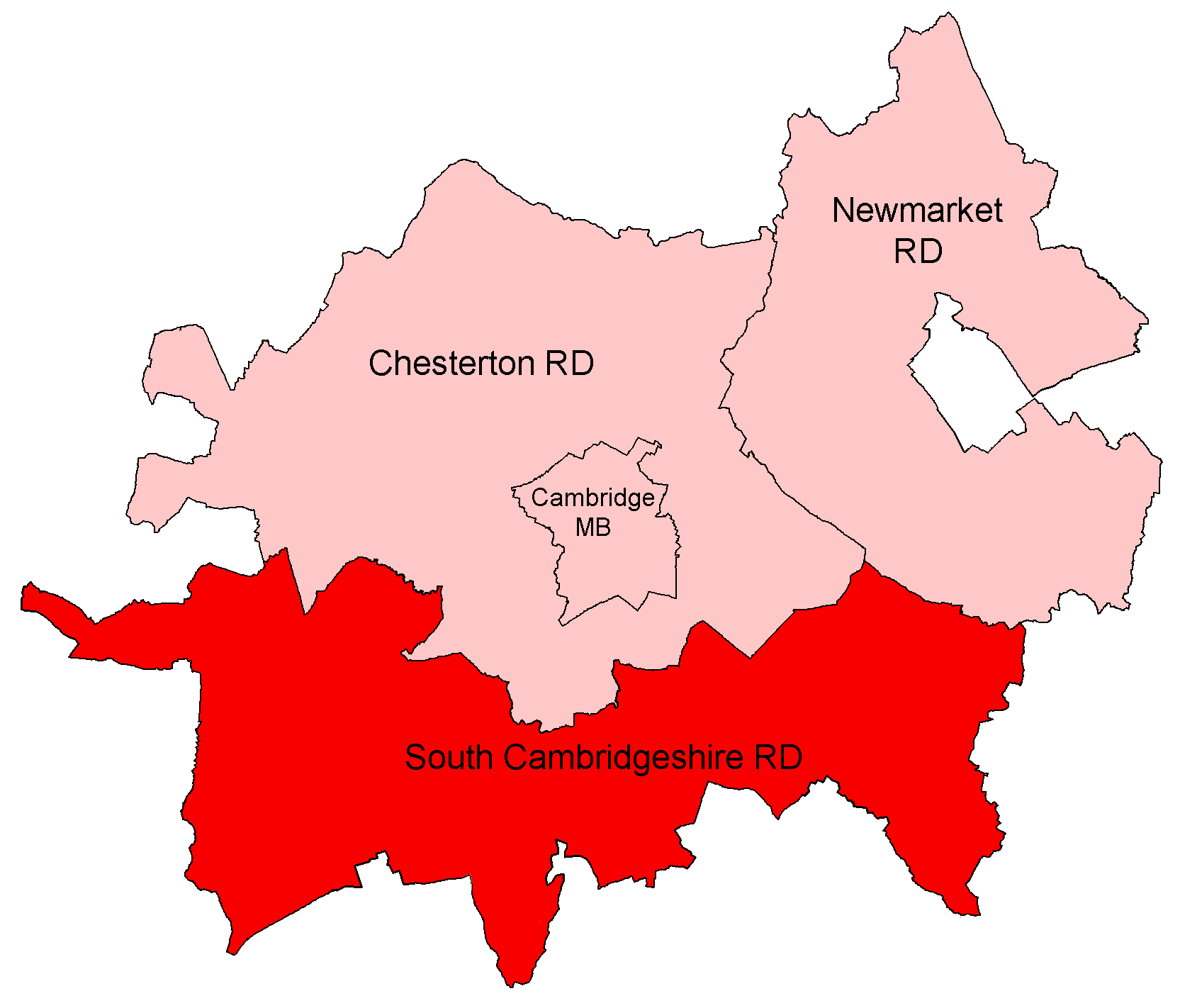
Position within Cambridgeshire

South Cambridgeshire was a rural district located in Cambridgeshire, England. It was established in 1934 under a County Review Order, resulting from the merger of Linton Rural District, Melbourn Rural District, and part of Caxton and Arrington Rural District. In 1965, it became part of the new administrative county of Cambridgeshire and the Isle of Ely. The council offices were situated at County Hall, Hobson Street, Cambridge, and the Council held its meetings at Shire Hall, Castle Hill, also in Cambridge, though both locations were outside the district. It was abolished in 1974 under the Local Government Act 1972 and merged with the Chesterton Rural District to form a new South Cambridgeshire district.

== Parishes ==
Parish	From	To	Notes
Abington Pigotts			Previously Melbourn RD
Arrington			Previously Caxton and Arrington RD
Babraham			Previously Linton RD
Balsham			Previously Linton RD
Barrington			Previously Melbourn RD
Bartlow			Previously Linton RD
Bassingbourn cum Kneesworth	1966		Merger of Bassingbourn & Kneesworth
Bassingbourn		1966	Previously Melbourn RD
Carlton			Previously Linton RD
Castle Camps			Previously Linton RD
Croydon			Previously Caxton and Arrington RD
Duxford			Previously Linton RD
East Hatley		1957	Previously Caxton and Arrington RD. See Hatley
Fowlmere			Previously Melbourn RD
Foxton			Previously Melbourn RD
Gamlingay			Previously Caxton and Arrington RD
Great Abington			Previously Linton RD
Great and Little Chishill	1968		Merger of Great Chishill & Little Chishill
Great Chishill		1968	Previously Melbourn RD
Great Eversden			Previously Caxton and Arrington RD
Guilden Morden			Previously Melbourn RD
Hatley	1957		Merger of East Hatley, Hatley St George and other parts
Hatley St George		1957	Previously Caxton and Arrington RD
Heydon			Previously Melbourn RD
Hildersham			Previously Linton RD
Hinxton			Previously Linton RD
Horseheath			Previously Linton RD
Ickleton			Previously Linton RD
Kingston			Previously Caxton and Arrington RD
Kneesworth		1966	Previously Melbourn RD. See Bassingbourn cum Kneesworth
Linton			Previously Linton RD
Litlington			Previously Melbourn RD
Little Abington			Previously Linton RD
Little Chishill		1968	Previously Melbourn RD
Little Eversden			Previously Caxton and Arrington RD
Little Gransden			Previously Caxton and Arrington RD
Longstowe			Previously Caxton and Arrington RD
Melbourn			Previously Melbourn RD
Meldreth			Previously Melbourn RD
Orwell			Previously Caxton and Arrington RD
Pampisford			Previously Linton RD
Sawston			Previously Linton RD
Shepreth			Previously Melbourn RD
Shingay cum Wendy	1957		Merger of Shingay & Wendy
Shingay		1957	Previously Melbourn RD
Shudy Camps			Previously Linton RD
Steeple Morden			Previously Melbourn RD
Tadlow			Previously Caxton and Arrington RD
Thriplow			Previously Melbourn RD
Wendy		1957	Previously Melbourn RD. See Shingay cum Wendy
West Wickham			Previously Linton RD
West Wratting			Previously Linton RD
Weston Colville			Previously Linton RD
Whaddon			Previously Melbourn RD
Whittlesford			Previously Linton RD
Wimpole			Previously Caxton and Arrington RD
