= Melbourn Rural District =

Former local government area in the UK

Coordinates: 52.096°N 0.087°E

- Rural district
- Population
  - 1901: 8,556
  - 1931: 7,782
- History
  - Created: 28 December 1894
  - Abolished: 31 March 1934
  - Succeeded by: South Cambridgeshire Rural District
  - HQ: Royston
- Contained within
  - County Council: Cambridgeshire

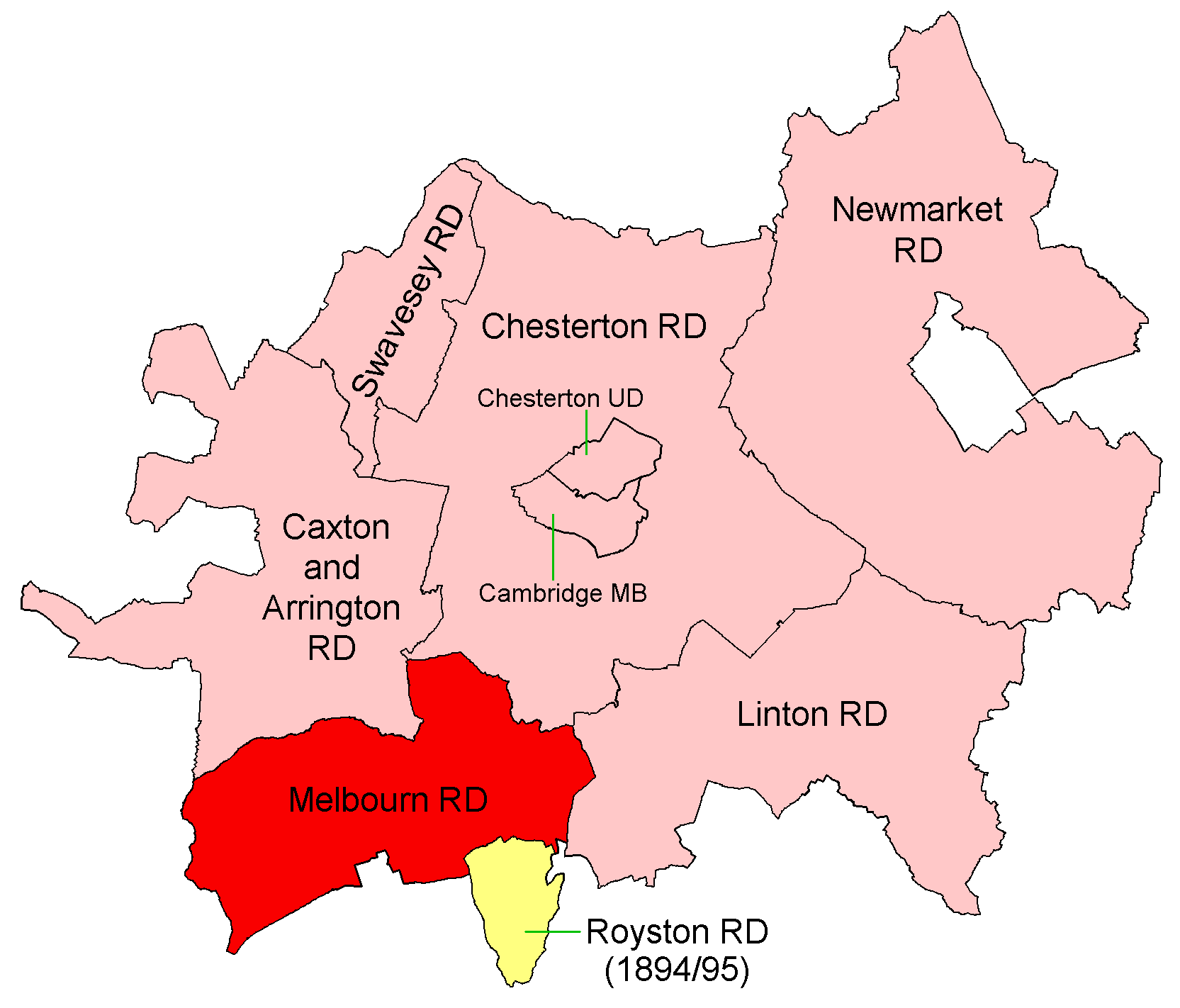
Position within Cambridgeshire

Melbourn Rural District was a rural district in Cambridgeshire, England, from 1894 to 1934.

== Formation ==
The district had its origins in the Royston Rural Sanitary District. This had been created under the Public Health Acts of 1872 and 1875, giving public health and local government responsibilities for rural areas to the existing boards of guardians of poor law unions. Under the Local Government Act 1894, rural sanitary districts became rural districts from 28 December 1894. Where rural sanitary districts straddled county boundaries, as Royston Rural Sanitary District did, they were to be split into separate rural districts in each county, but with provision that the relevant county councils could agree variations to this general rule with the approval of the Local Government Board. A joint committee of Cambridgeshire, Essex, and Hertfordshire County Councils considered the question of the Royston Rural Sanitary District during 1894 prior to the Local Government Act coming into force, and agreed that the three Essex parishes in the sanitary district should not form a rural district on their own, but should be included in a rural district with the Cambridgeshire parishes, which would be called the Melbourn Rural District.

The link between the new rural district and the poor law union continued, with all the elected councillors of the rural district council being ex officio members of the Royston Board of Guardians. The first meeting of the Melbourn Rural District Council was held on 2 January 1895 at the board room of the Royston Union Workhouse. William Clark of Thriplow was elected the council's first chairman, and he held the post for over thirteen years.

The anomaly of Melbourn Rural District straddling Cambridgeshire and Essex was resolved less than a year after the district's creation, with the three Essex parishes of Great Chishill, Little Chishill and Heydon being transferred from Essex to Cambridgeshire on 30 September 1895.

Whilst agreement had been reached for how to treat the Essex parishes during 1894 prior to the Local Government Act coming into force, the situation regarding the town of Royston took longer to resolve. Royston straddled Hertfordshire and Cambridgeshire. There was a parish of Royston and a larger special drainage district which included Royston parish and parts of four neighbouring parishes. Both the parish and the special drainage district were partly in Hertfordshire and partly in Cambridgeshire. A joint committee of Hertfordshire and Cambridgeshire County Councils held inquiries during 1894 trying to reach agreement as to how best to deal with Royston. No solution that would keep the town together could be found that was acceptable to the two county councils. Therefore, when the Local Government Act came into force at the end of the year, Royston parish was split along the county boundary through the middle of the town into a Royston (Hertfordshire) parish and a Royston (Cambridgeshire) parish, with the Cambridgeshire parish being included within the Melbourn Rural District and the Hertfordshire part in the Ashwell Rural District. The special drainage district was likewise split into a North Royston Special Drainage District and a South Royston Special Drainage District, with the former being administered by the new Melbourn Rural District Council.

The question of how the town of Royston should be governed took another couple of years to resolve after the Local Government Act had come into force. Competing proposals were put forward from the two county councils, with both Cambridgeshire and Hertfordshire wanting the whole town. Eventually, the Local Government Board directed that town should all be placed in Hertfordshire, and on 30 September 1896 the parish of Royston (Cambridgeshire) and the parts of the Cambridgeshire parishes of Bassingbourn, Kneesworth, and Melbourn that were within the North Royston Special Drainage District were removed from the Melbourn Rural District and transferred to the Ashwell Rural District in Hertfordshire. The following year they would become part of the new Royston Urban District.

== Parishes ==
Melbourn Rural District contained the following civil parishes. After the northern part of Royston had been removed from the district in 1896, Melbourn Rural District consisted of a number of rural parishes in the area broadly north and east of Royston.

Parish	From	To	Notes
Abington Pigotts	1894	1934	
Barrington	1894	1934	
Bassingbourn	1894	1934	Part of parish within North Royston Special Drainage district transferred to Hertfordshire on 30 September 1896 as parish of South Bassingbourn.
Fowlmere	1894	1934	
Foxton	1894	1934	
Great Chishill	1894	1934	In Essex until 30 September 1895.
Guilden Morden	1894	1934	
Heydon	1894	1934	In Essex until 30 September 1895.
Kneesworth	1894	1934	Part of parish within North Royston Special Drainage district transferred to Hertfordshire on 30 September 1896 as parish of South Kneesworth.
Litlington	1894	1934	
Little Chishill	1894	1934	In Essex until 30 September 1895.
Melbourn	1894	1934	Part of parish within North Royston Special Drainage district transferred to Hertfordshire on 30 September 1896 as parish of South Melbourn.
Meldreth	1894	1934	
Royston	1894	1896	Parish of Royston (Cambridgeshire) created from the Cambridgeshire part of the pre-1894 parish. Transferred to Hertfordshire on 30 September 1896 as parish of North Royston.
Shepreth	1894	1934	
Shingay	1894	1934	
Steeple Morden	1894	1934	
Thriplow	1894	1934	
Wendy	1894	1934	
Whaddon	1894	1934	

== Premises ==
Although named after Melbourn, the district's largest village, the council remained based in the town of Royston, reflecting the district's origins in the Royston Poor Law Union. The council generally met at the board room of the Royston Union Workhouse on Baldock Road in Royston.

== Abolition ==
Melbourn Rural District was abolished under a County Review Order, merging with other districts to form the South Cambridgeshire Rural District on 1 April 1934.
