= Shingay cum Wendy =

Civil parish in Cambridgeshire, England

Coordinates: 52.1083°N 0.08577°W

- Location within Cambridgeshire
- Population: 104 (2001); 139 (2011)
- OS grid reference: TL311472
- District: South Cambridgeshire
- Shire county: Cambridgeshire
- Region: East
- Country: England
- Sovereign state: United Kingdom
- Post town: ROYSTON
- Postcode district: SG8
- Dialling code: 01223
- Police: Cambridgeshire
- Fire: Cambridgeshire
- Ambulance: East of England
- UK Parliament: South Cambridgeshire

Shingay cum Wendy is a civil parish in the English county of Cambridgeshire, around 5 miles (8 km) north west of Royston.

Forming part of the district of South Cambridgeshire's Bassingbourn Ward, the parish's main settlements are Shingay and Wendy.

As Shingay cum Wendy has a low number of electors, the affairs of the parish are run by the parish meeting system.

== History ==
The parish historically consisted of two separate parishes: Shingay and Wendy. The two were united in 1957 to form the present civil parish, which covers an area of 1,791 acres (725 ha). The parish's straight eastern boundary with Whaddon follows the Roman Ermine Street (now the A1198), and its northern boundary with Croydon and Arrington follows the winding course of the River Cam. Its south and western borders with Bassingbourn, Abington Pigotts, and Steeple Morden largely follow field boundaries.

RAF Bassingbourn covers a portion of the south-eastern part of the parish, and was built just before the Second World War.

For additional history, see the pages for Shingay and Wendy.
