= Linton Rural District =

Former local government area in the UK

Coordinates: 52.10°N 0.28°E

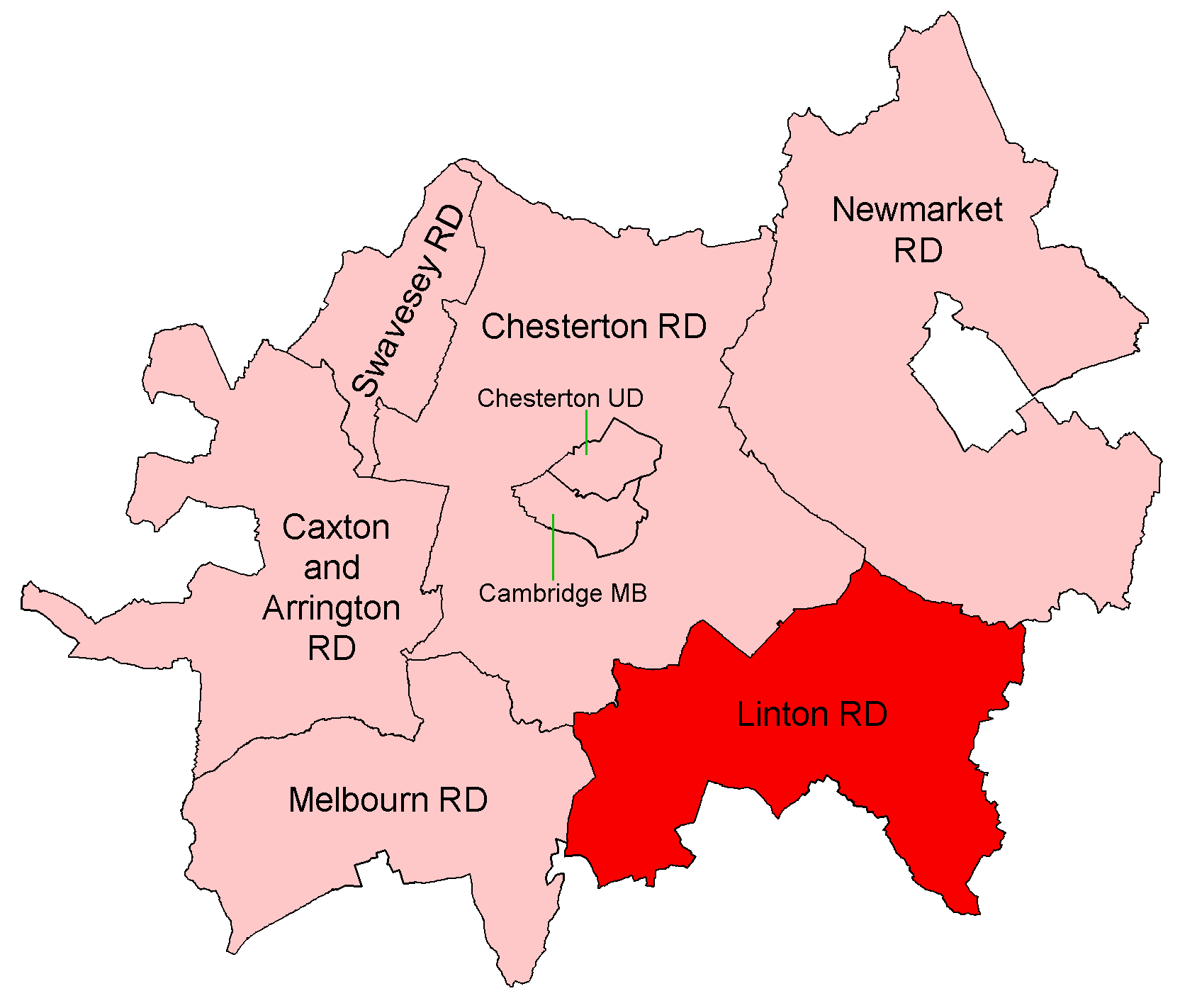
Position within Cambridgeshire

Linton was a rural district in Cambridgeshire, England, from 1894 to 1934.

It was formed in 1894 under the Local Government Act 1894, covering the area of the previous Linton rural sanitary district, save for the Essex parish of Bartlow End, which was placed in the Saffron Walden Rural District. It included the parishes of Babraham, Balsham, Bartlow, Carlton, Castle Camps, Duxford, Great Abington, Hildersham, Hinxton, Horseheath, Ickleton, Linton, Little Abington, Pampisford, Sawston, Shudy Camps, West Wickham, West Wratting, Weston Colville, and Whittlesford.

In 1934 under a County Review Order, it was abolished, and its area merged with other districts to form the South Cambridgeshire Rural District.
