= Thomas Lester (business) =

English lace merchant (1791–1867)

- Born: Thomazin Lester; 1791; Abington Pigotts, Cambridgeshire
- Died: 1867 (aged 75–76); Bedford, Bedfordshire
- Occupation: Lace merchant

Thomas Lester (1791 – 1867) was a prominent lace merchant in the rural lacemaking industry in Bedfordshire, establishing a Lace Manufactory business which survived until the onset of machine-made lace in the early 20th century. His designs were exhibited at the Great Exhibition in 1851, receiving a prize medal, though even at that time, the awarding jury noted the decline in demand for lace in the East Midlands styles.

Lester's influence was in securing innovative new designs, and many of these are preserved in the collections of the Cecil Higgins Art Gallery and Museum. Today's lacemakers are working with patterns from the museum to preserve and perpetuate the designs.

Designs inscribed with Lester's name are reproduced in some of the standard works on Bedfordshire Lace, for example, by Barbara M. Underwood. The collections of lace samples, patterns and designs have been catalogued and published by the Higgins Museum.

A number of samples of Lester's designs (or those attributed to him), often showing the development of naturalistic themes, are to be found in the collections of the Victoria and Albert Museum.

Lester and his wife, Elizabeth (née Fox), had a long association with the Bunyan Meeting in Bedford, home to a non-conformist congregation founded by John Bunyan, preacher and writer.
