= Ely Ensign =

Ely Ensign was the news and current affairs magazine for the Anglican Diocese of Ely from December 1989 until January 2007.

== Background ==
Ely Ensign, commonly called The Ensign, was launched as the official newspaper for the Diocese of Ely in 1989. It was conceived as a news based magazine with a variety of comment, educational articles and local history of wide interest in addition to news relating to the work of the Diocese.

Unlike most diocesan in-house magazines Ely Ensign contained up-to-date news stories and features written by professional journalists who gave their time voluntarily. Much of its content was newsworthy and of general interest and it built up a wide readership which included subscribers who had no particular link with the Anglican Church.

== Notable news stories ==
=== Che Jesus ===
Ely Ensign played a central role in the Che Jesus controversy when the Churches Advertising Network (CAN) in 1999 carried out a marketing campaign which featured a poster portraying Jesus Christ in the style of a famous picture of the Marxist revolutionary Che Guevara. At the time of the launch, Ely Vicar and former advertising executive, the Reverend Peter Owen-Jones, wrote in the Ely Ensign that the image "would be pinned to the walls of teenage girls' rooms". His comment infuriated leading critics who voiced their opinions in the national press. Replying to the criticism the Bishop of Ely Stephen Sykes defended the campaign in The Ensign and rejected accusations that it was blasphemous. "The intention of the advertisement is to cause remark," he said. "It has been successful."

=== Forces sweethearts reunited ===
The discovery of a memorial window at the USAAF Museum in Savannah, Georgia, which featured a UK Cambridgeshire church, led to an unusual story about the revival of a wartime romance. American fighter pilots in the 457th Bombardment Group based at Glatton, near Peterborough, during the Second World War had used the neighbouring Conington village church as a landmark during their bombing raids over Germany. The distinctive four spires on All Saints Church tower were a reminder to pilots that they were close to home after many hours in the air. In time this church became a memorable icon for the American veterans as they visited the village every two years to remember their fallen colleagues. A resident of Glatton, Sarah Baines, read the Ely Ensign article, and was reunited with her former American forces sweetheart whom she had not met for sixty years.

=== Controversial appointment ===
The Ely Ensign had an open and robust approach to its news stories and was not afraid to report stories that might be unfavourable to the Diocese. In 1998 it covered a dispute in the village of Eltisely caused by the proposed appointment of a team Vicar who was separated from her husband.

== History ==
With the increase in printing costs and decrease in advertising revenue, the Ely Ensign came to a close in 2007. Requests from its readers led to its popular style being incorporated into an online diocesan newsletter called eLife.

During Ely Ensign's eighteen-year life it won several awards including the Christian Media Award in 2005.

The Ensign was the last of three diocesan magazines published by Ely. The original publication was the Ely Diocesan Remembrancer which began in May 1885 and ran until December 1915.

The Remembrancer was replaced in January 1916 by the Ely Diocesan Gazette, the forerunner of the Ely Ensign.

== Editors ==
Years	Editor
1989–1997	John-David Yule
1998–2001	Steven Levitt
2001-2006	Owen Spencer-Thomas
2006–2007	Pat Kilbey
