= Clopton, Cambridgeshire =

Deserted village in United Kingdom

Clopton
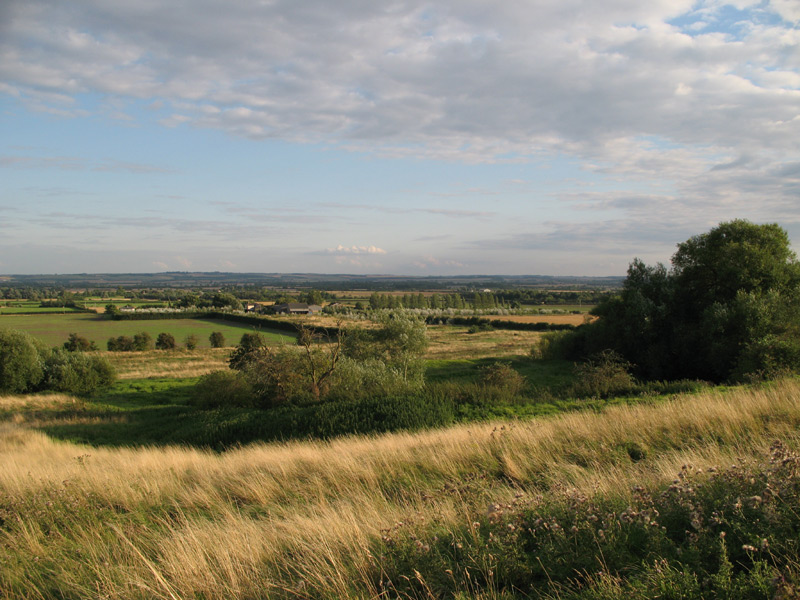
- Site of Clopton village

- Location in Cambridgeshire
- 52.124°N 0.093°W
- Location: Cambridgeshire, England
- OS grid reference: TL303487

Clopton is a deserted medieval village (DMV), about 1 mile (1.6 km) south west of the village of Croydon, Cambridgeshire, that once stood on a prominent ridge from which it gained its name. Its history reaches back to the Roman occupation, and an Anglo-Saxon village, covering approximately 30 acres (12 ha) was established by the 10th century. The village is referenced in the Domesday Book, when 18 peasants were noted as inhabiting it. A Friday market was granted in 1292 to Robert Hoo, Lord of Clopton.

The place-name 'Clopton' is first attested circa 1080 in the Inquisitio Comitatus Cantabrigiensis, where it appears as Cloptona. It appears as Cloptune in the Domesday Book of 1086. The name means 'town or settlement on a hill'.

It is believed that the village was deserted in the early 16th Century between 1500 and 1518 after John Fisher, a London lawyer, had purchased the land from the Clopton family in 1489. He then evicted the villagers to create enclosures.

Archaeologists have located the site for the parish church of Saint Mary, two moated sites, and a probable mill. The church is recorded in poor repair by 1561, which is when it appears that Clopton became amalgamated with neighbouring Croydon to its east. The church was subsequently demolished and turned over to agriculture by 1660.

The site is now a Scheduled Ancient Monument and consists of earthworks.
