= Marshland St James =

Village in Norfolk, England

Coordinates: 52.656915°N 0.240498°E

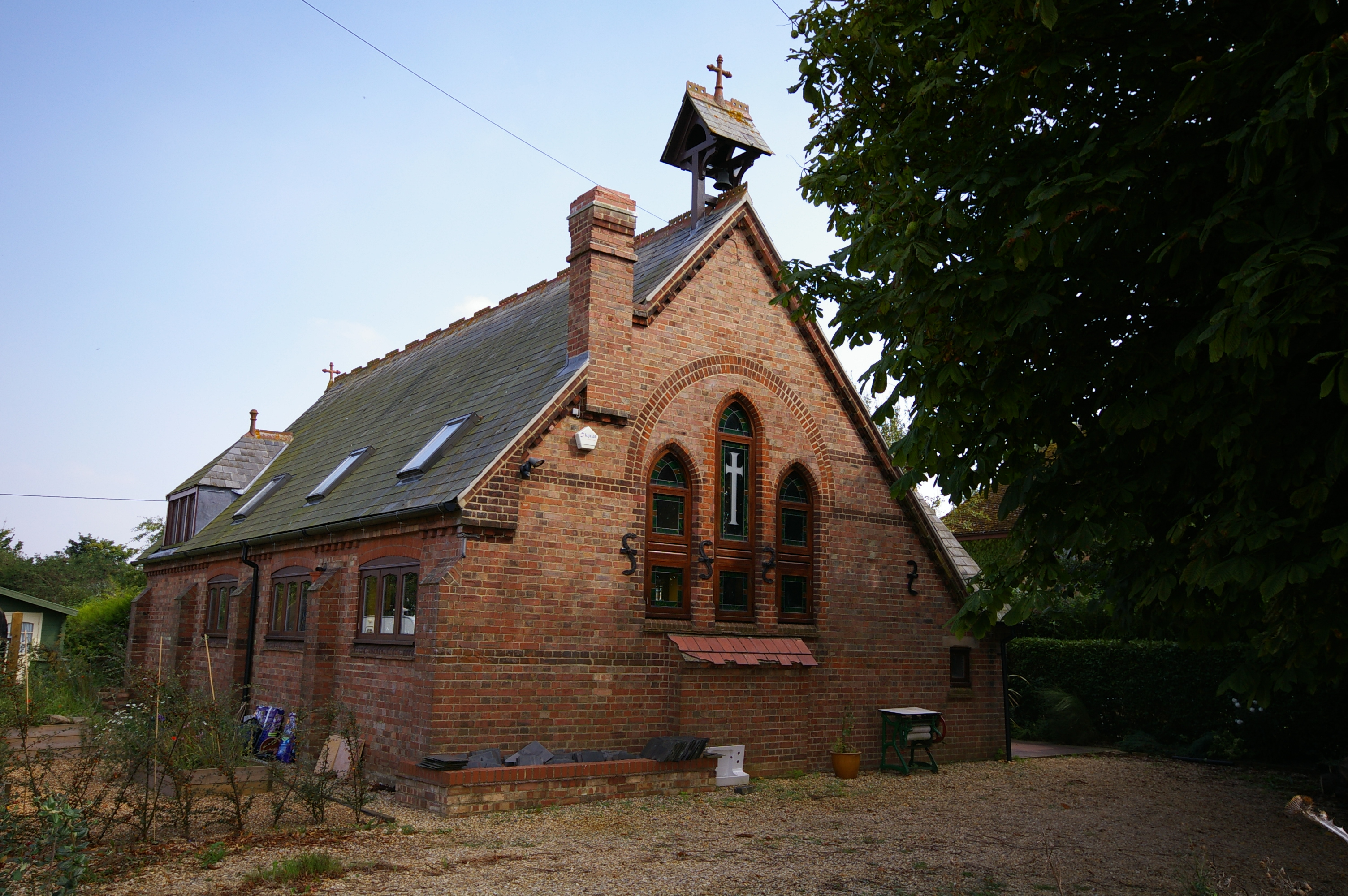
- Former church in Marshland St James

- Location within Norfolk
- Area: 25.69 km^{2} (9.92 sq mi)
- Population: 1,209 (2011)
  - Density: 47/km^{2} (120/sq mi)
- OS grid reference: TF516089
- Civil parish: Marshland St James
- District: King's Lynn and West Norfolk
- Shire county: Norfolk
- Region: East
- Country: England
- Sovereign state: United Kingdom
- Post town: WISBECH
- Postcode district: PE14
- Dialling code: 01945
- Police: Norfolk
- Fire: Norfolk
- Ambulance: East of England

Marshland St James is a village and civil parish in the English county of Norfolk. It covers an area of 25.69 km^{2} (9.92 sq mi) and had a population of 1,137 in 456 households at the 2001 census, increasing to 1,209 at the 2011 Census. For the purposes of local government, it falls within the district of King's Lynn and West Norfolk.

Churches

Marshland St James had multiple churches which are Anglican and Methodist. The parish church is St James in the deanery of Lynn Marshland, in the archdeaconry of Wisbech. The original Church of England church was St James. It was founded in 1837 and closed in 2002. The church did not have a graveyard.

Marshland Fen Methodist Church was founded before 1907. The Primitive Methodist church was an early 19th century (1807) secession from the Wesleyan Methodist church and was particularly successful in evangelising agricultural and industrial communities at open meetings. In 1932 the Primitive Methodists joined with the Wesleyan Methodists and the United Methodists to form the Methodist Church of Great Britain.

Historical geography

Marshland St James is about 11 miles S.W. of King's Lynn. It was created as an ecclesiastical parish in 1922, and as a civil parish in 1935, from parts of Clenchwarton, Emneth, Terrington St Clement, Terrington St John, Tilney All Saints, Tilney St Lawrence, Tilney cum Islington, Walpole St Andrew, Walpole St Peter, and West Walton. [from Kelly's Directory of Norfolk 1937]

Marshland St James is in Freebridge Marshland hundred.
