= Tadlow =

Village in Cambridgeshire, England

Coordinates: 52.11°N 0.13°W

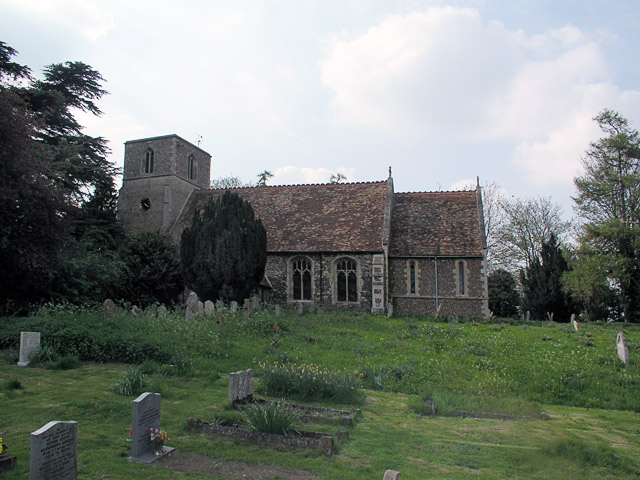
- St Giles

- Location within Cambridgeshire
- Population: 178 (2011)
- OS grid reference: TL280474
- District: South Cambridgeshire
- Shire county: Cambridgeshire
- Region: East
- Country: England
- Sovereign state: United Kingdom
- Post town: ROYSTON
- Postcode district: SG8
- Dialling code: 01767
- UK Parliament: South Cambridgeshire

Tadlow is a small village and civil parish in South Cambridgeshire, England on the River Cam (or Rhee). It is 20 kilometres (12 mi) south-west of Cambridge and 9 kilometres (6 mi) north-east of Biggleswade, Bedfordshire. In 2001 the population was 181 and the area of the village is 681 hectares (1,683 acres).

== History ==
Tadlow's name is derived from the burial ground or 'Tumulus of a man named Tada', perhaps an Anglo-Saxon chieftain who established it. It was spelled Tadeslaue in 1080 and Tadelai in the 1086 Domesday Book.

There were 28 peasants present in 1086; the population peaked around 1300 but fell after 1400 to a level which it maintained until the 19th century. Tadlow village declined after 1660. The medieval village probably developed around a street running south-south-east from the church. A hamlet called Pincote (now in Hatley parish, but probably decayed after 1450. New houses were built in the 1970s between two groups of 19th-century cottages.

Before the 19th century, there was an ancient route westwards from Croydon, along the hill, with another 750 metres to the south along the river. The Cambridge to Biggleswade turnpike was built in 1826.

== Governance ==
Tadlow is represented on South Cambridgeshire District Council by one councillor for The Mordens electoral ward and on Cambridgeshire County Council by one councillor for the Bassingbourn electoral division. It is in the parliamentary constituency of South Cambridgeshire, represented at the House of Commons by Anthony Browne.

== Geography ==
Tadlow is 20 kilometres (12 mi) south-west of Cambridge, 9 kilometres (6 mi) north-east of Biggleswade, Bedfordshire, and 67 kilometres (42 mi) north of London. The B1042 road bisects the parish, with Wrestlingworth to the west and Croydon to the east.

The main village street lies to the south of the road and the River Cam, or Rhee, forms the southern boundary. The parish borders Bedfordshire in the west and varies from 75 metres, along the northern boundary with Hatley, to less than 30 metres above sea level, along the river. The area of the parish is 681 hectares (1,683 acres) and the soil is stiff clay with a clay subsoil.

== Demography ==
At the time of the 2001 census, Tadlow parish had 181 residents living in 78 households. All were White; 81.1% described themselves as Christian with the rest stating 'no religion' or not citing one.

== Landmarks ==
A roll of honour in St Giles's church commemorates the four Tadlow men killed in World War I and all those from the village who served in both World Wars.

== Religious sites ==
St Giles's church, north of the Biggleswade to Cambridge road, is dedicated to St Giles and was founded around 1092. It is built in the Early English style with a 13th-century nave, and a 14th-century western tower containing a clock and a peal of three bells including more modern Perpendicular additions. It was restored by William Butterfield, whose campaign of restoration at St Giles's spanned nearly twenty years, from 1855 to 1874. The church remains in the Diocese of Ely. It is a Grade II* listed building and is now in the care of Friends of Friendless Churches, which looks after redundant churches in England and Wales.
