= Shingay =

Hamlet in Cambridgeshire, England

Coordinates: 52.1034°N 0.0930°W

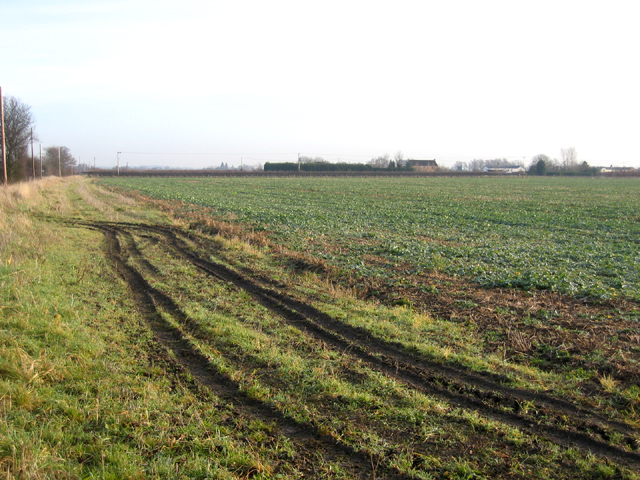

- Location within Cambridgeshire
- OS grid reference: TL307467
- Civil parish: Shingay cum Wendy
- District: South Cambridgeshire
- Shire county: Cambridgeshire
- Region: East
- Country: England
- Sovereign state: United Kingdom
- Post town: Royston
- Postcode district: SG8
- Dialling code: 01223
- Police: Cambridgeshire
- Fire: Cambridgeshire
- Ambulance: East of England

Shingay is a hamlet and former civil parish, now in the parish of Shingay cum Wendy, in the South Cambridgeshire district, in the county of Cambridgeshire, England around 5 miles (8.0 km) northwest of Royston. In 1951 the parish had a population of 38.

== History ==
Shingay was a separate parish until 1 April 1957 when it was merged with neighbouring Wendy to form the present civil parish of Shingay cum Wendy. The historical parish covered an area of 768 acres (311 ha). Its northern border with Croydon (formerly Croydon-cum-Clapton) followed the River Cam, and its eastern border with Wendy was marked by the North Ditch. Its southern border with Abington Pigotts also largely followed drainage channels, and its western border with Steeple Morden followed field boundaries marked by Shingay Gate Farm. The parish was largely wooded until the mid-19th century, but little woodland now remains.

The medieval parish was dominated by the preceptory of the Knights Hospitallers which was situated on the south bank of the river and owned all the land in the parish between the early 12th century and 1540. When the order was suppressed in 1540 it held land in 42 parishes in Cambridgeshire as well as five other counties. Its proximity to the Old North Road resulted in its hosting royalty at various points.

It is believed that the medieval village lay just to the east of the preceptory on the road towards Wendy. The village was depopulated in the 15th century. Population increased to a peak of 142 in 1851 but had dropped to 38 by the time it was merged with Wendy.

The former parish church was dedicated to St Mary and possibly built at the same time as the preceptory. The medieval church was demolished in the late 17th century and in 1697 a new chapel, consisting of just a single room of two bays and west bell turret, was built by the Earl of Orford who had just obtained the manor. The chapel fell into disuse in the 18th century and the final trace of the building was removed by 1836.

The village's name means "island of Scene's people".
