= Arrington, Cambridgeshire =

Village in Cambridgeshire, England

Coordinates: 52.13515°N 0.06475°W

Arrington
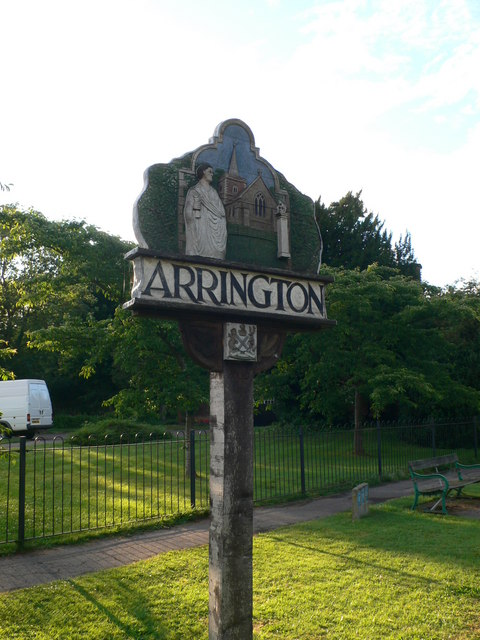
- Village sign, Arrington

- Location within Cambridgeshire
- Population: 415 (2011 Census)
- OS grid reference: TL334501
- District: South Cambridgeshire
- Shire county: Cambridgeshire
- Region: East
- Country: England
- Sovereign state: United Kingdom
- Post town: ROYSTON
- Postcode district: SG8
- Dialling code: 01223
- Police: Cambridgeshire
- Fire: Cambridgeshire
- Ambulance: East of England
- Website: http://www.arrington.org.uk

Arrington is a small village and civil parish in the South Cambridgeshire district of Cambridgeshire, England, with a population of 415 at the time of 2011 census. The village is 6 miles (10 km) north of Royston, Hertfordshire, and 9 miles (14 km) south-west of the county city of Cambridge.

== History ==
Arrington is on the A1198 road, the old Roman Ermine Street. Around 950, the settlement's name was written as Earnningtone; in the 1086 Domesday Book it was spelled Erningtune. By the 13th century, the village was known as Aring(e)ton(e). The probable meaning was 'farmstead of the family or followers of a man called Earn(a)'. Flint tools have been found along the spring line around Church Farm.

== Governance ==
The parish council has seven councillors. Arrington is represented on South Cambridgeshire District Council by one councillor for The Mordens ward and on Cambridgeshire County Council by one councillor for Gamlingay electoral division. At Wesminster it is part of the South Cambridgeshire constituency.

== Geography ==
Arrington village and parish are mostly west of the A1198 road, with the exception of a small area of land to the east, next to Wimpole Park. A minor road runs west to Croydon; the next village north is Longstowe and Wendy lies south. Arrington is nine miles south-west of the county town of Cambridge and 44 miles north of London.

The parish ranges from 20 to 76 metres above sea level. The River Cam forms the southern boundary of the parish. The parish's soil is described as 'clayey' with chalk and gault subsoil.

== Landmarks ==
A war memorial, built in the 1920s, is dedicated to Arrington men and women who died in the First and Second World Wars. It stands at the old junction of the road to Cambridge and Ermine Street.

There are 20 listed buildings in Arrington (including the church). Among them are the old post office and shop, nine houses and two milestones along Ermine Street, Wraggs Farmhouse, its barn and old granary, the Hardwicke Arms Hotel and entrance gates and piers to Wimpole Hall.

== Religious sites ==
Arrington's church is dedicated to St Nicholas. It has a brick tower with a low spire and contains one bell; the building was restored in 1894. It is a Grade I listed building. There are some pictures and a description of the church at the Cambridgeshire Churches website .

== Notable people ==
- John Richardson Major, Vicar of Arrington 1871–1876
