= Wendy, Cambridgeshire =

Hamlet in Cambridgeshire, England

Coordinates: 52.112°N 0.069°W

Wendy
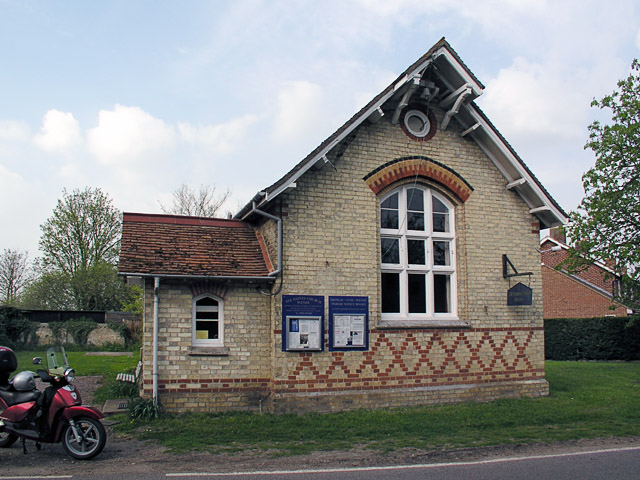
- All Saints Church, Wendy

- Location within Cambridgeshire
- OS grid reference: TL323477
- Civil parish: Shingay cum Wendy
- District: South Cambridgeshire
- Shire county: Cambridgeshire
- Region: East
- Country: England
- Sovereign state: United Kingdom
- Post town: Royston
- Postcode district: SG8
- Dialling code: 01223

Wendy is a hamlet and former civil parish, now in the parish of Shingay cum Wendy, in the South Cambridgeshire district, in the county of Cambridgeshire, England around 5 miles (8 km) north west of Royston. In 1951 the parish had a population of 81.

== History ==
Wendy was a separate parish until 1 April 1957 when it was merged with neighbouring Shingay to form the present civil parish of Shingay cum Wendy. The historical parish covered an area of 1,023 acres (414 ha). Its northern border with Croydon (formerly Croydon-cum-Clapton) and Arrington followed the River Cam, and its western border with Wendy was marked by the North Ditch. The parish's straight eastern boundary with Whaddon follows the Roman Ermine Street (now the A1198), and its southern border with Bassingbourn and Abington Pigotts largely follow field boundaries.

The hamlet itself is around a mile west of the Roman Road, just south of the river. There were 17 residents recorded in the Domesday Book of 1086, and there were probably around 80 in 1377, though numbers fell in later centuries. Wendy is listed in the Domesday Book under the name of 'Wandrie', with the annual value to its lord listed as 5 shillings. By 1801 there were 109 in the parish, rising to a peak of 154 in 1851 before dropping to 66 by 1931.

There are six listed buildings in the village and another three on the Roman Road.

RAF Bassingbourn covers a sizeable portion of the southern part of the parish, and was built just prior to the Second World War.

The village's name means "river-bend island", named after the sharp bend in the North Ditch where it joins the River Cam.

== Church ==
The former medieval parish church was probably built in the 12th century, extensively rebuilt in the 16th century by the Preceptory of Shingay, and dedicated to St Mary and later All Saints. It is listed as having a steeple.

By the 17th and 18th century was in a ruinous state and in 1734 was demolished and a new church, only 45 feet (14 m) in length with a western bell turret, was completed by 1737. By the 1860s the church was deemed unsafe for use and a nearby barn was dedicated for services. The church was again demolished and a new church opened on the same site in 1866.

The 19th century church was built in the Early English style with a chancel and south vestry, a three-bay nave with a western bell turret, and a west porch. The double hammerbeam roof over the nave was taken from the recently dismantled church of All Saints in the Jewry that stood opposite Trinity College in Cambridge.

Once again the church's foundations proved insufficient and extensive cracks after the Second World War led to its demolition in around 1950.

Until 1972 services were held in the mission church at Shingay, after which the old school in Wendy was consecrated as a church, and still serves as All Saints Church.

== Village life ==
Wendy is too small to sustain any pubs or amenities. From at least 1809 to 1851 the Cox family ran the Windsor Arms next to the church and there was a shop for a period during the 19th century, but no pubs have been recorded since then.

A school was built in Wendy in 1828 by Thomas Windsor, and was rebuilt in 1875 with an attendance of around 38. By 1902 there were only 19 children and the school was closed in 1904. The Wendy and Shingay District Church of England School opened in Wendy in 1906, closing again in 1931 with the children transferred to Bassingbourn.
