= Litlington, Cambridgeshire =

Village in Cambridgeshire, England

Coordinates: 52.067°N 0.084°W

Litlington
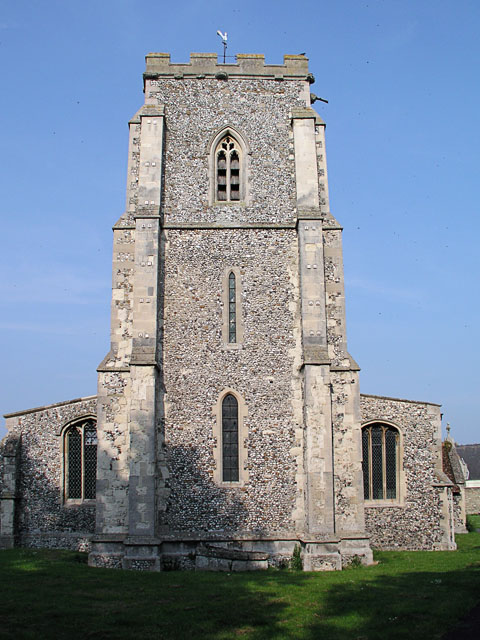
- Litlington, St Catherine

- Location within Cambridgeshire
- Population: 813; 877 (2011)
- OS grid reference: TL313427
- District: South Cambridgeshire
- Shire county: Cambridgeshire
- Region: East
- Country: England
- Sovereign state: United Kingdom
- Post town: ROYSTON
- Postcode district: SG8
- Dialling code: 01763

Litlington is a village and civil parish in the East of England region and the county of Cambridgeshire in the United Kingdom. The village lies approximately 14 miles (23 km) southwest of Cambridge and 3 miles (4.8 km) northwest of Royston.

== History ==
The parish of Litlington covers 2,171 acres (879 ha) in a thin north–south rectangular shape. Its southern border runs along the county border with Hertfordshire on the Icknield Way that now follows the A505. Its northern border with Abington Pigotts follows a stream, and its western and eastern boundary with Steeple Morden and Bassingbourn follow field boundaries.

The ancient track Ashwell Street runs through the parish just south of the village, and the parish has been occupied continuously for over 2000 years. A Roman villa probably dating from the 2nd century AD and containing 30 rooms was discovered just west of the village in 1829 and was excavated in 1881, 1913 and 2010.

Prior to the building of the Royston bypass, traffic would frequently go through Litlington to avoid Royston itself. This led to such a volume of traffic that in 1971 the village became the first in Cambridgeshire to introduce a one-way system through the village.

The village was referenced as Litlingetona in ca. 1080, appearing in the Domesday Book as Lidlingtone and Lidlintone, and in its current form as early as 1242. The name "Litlington" means "farmstead of the family or followers of a man called Lytel". Sir William de Notton, a leading politician and judge who died in 1365 held the manor of Litlington in the mid-fourteenth century.

== Church ==
The parish church of St Catherine consists of a chancel with vestry, aisled and clerestoried nave with south porch and west tower. The earliest parts of the church, including the base of the tower, date from the 13th century. The tower itself is mostly 14th century, and once had a short spire. The church was extensively refurbished at the start of the 19th century, and with the addition of a gallery increased its capacity to around 500. St. Catherine's Church tower was used as a positioning focus for P47 and P51 fighter aircraft landing at nearby RAF Steeple Morden, home of the United States Army Air Force 355th Fighter Group in World War Two. In 1993, a stained glass window honouring the 355th—made in the USA—was installed in the church and on 16 May 1993, the window was dedicated by The Bishop of Huntingdon, Gordon Roe.

== Village life ==
Litlington's one remaining public house, The Crown, which opened in the late 19th century, has now closed. Other former pubs include the Robin Hood and Little John, recorded in the early 19th century and closing around 1910. It was named after a local legend that an arrow fired by Robin Hood at the village's chalkpit had grown into a thorn tree. The Seven Stars also opened in the late 19th century. The Horse and Groom, in the south west corner of the parish, straddling the border with Steeple Morden, was open in the late 18th century to serve travellers on the turnpike. It closed towards the end of the 20th century.

The village also retains a village shop with post office, a village hall and a football ground with Recreation Centre and play area.

== Time Team ==
"There's A Villa Here Somewhere" was an episode of Time Team first transmitted on 7 November 2010. "A quiet Cambridgeshire village gets the full Time Team treatment as Tony and the digging team hunt for the missing remains of what is believed to be one of Britain's biggest Roman villas, and a walled roman cemetery." The dig was focused around a copse to the south-west of Anvil Avenue.
