= West Wickham, Cambridgeshire =

Village in Cambridgeshire, England

Coordinates: 52.1202°N 0.3575°E

West Wickham
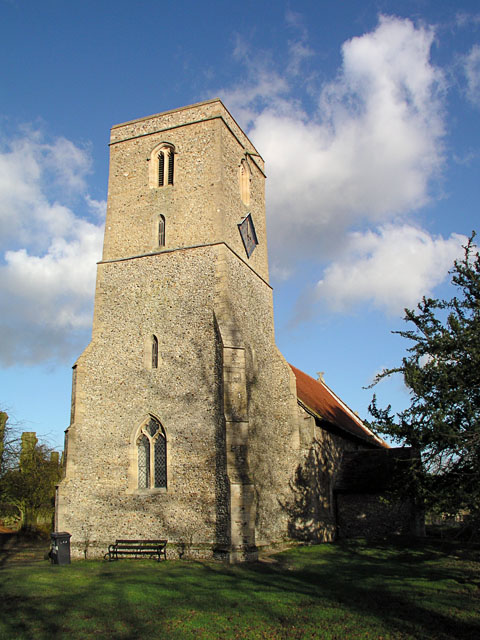
- St Mary's Church

- Location within Cambridgeshire
- Population: 423 (2001); 440 (2011)
- OS grid reference: TL6149
- Civil parish: West Wickham
- District: South Cambridgeshire
- Shire county: Cambridgeshire
- Region: East
- Country: England
- Sovereign state: United Kingdom
- Post town: Cambridge
- Postcode district: CB21
- Dialling code: 01223
- Police: Cambridgeshire
- Fire: Cambridgeshire
- Ambulance: East of England
- Website: www.westwickham.org

West Wickham is a village and civil parish in South Cambridgeshire, England, 10 miles south-east of Cambridge on the border with Suffolk. In 2011 it had a population of 423.

== History ==
The parish of West Wickham and Streetly End is approximately rectangular and covers an area of 2,931 acres. Its straight southern border follows the ancient track of Wool Street that divide it from the parishes of Linton and Horseheath. Field boundaries separate it from West Wratting to the north, and Balsham to the west. Its eastern boundary follows the border with Suffolk.

At the time of the Domesday Book in 1086, the parish contained three settlements: Wickham at the centre, plus the hamlets of Enhale (now Yen Hall) and Streetly (now Streetly End). Streetly End still has a number of houses, but Yen Hall consisted only of a farmhouse by the 18th century. By the 14th century a hamlet had appeared at "Bovetoun", and still exists as Burton End.

The village was known as Wickham until the 14th century, at which time the prefix "West" was added, presumably to distinguish it from the Wickhams in Suffolk (now known as Wickham Market and Wickham Skeith). The name "Wickham" means "homestead associated with a vicus, an earlier Romano-British settlement".

== Church ==
The village was listed as having a church in 1200, but nothing survives of the building from that time. The present parish church, dedicated to Saint Mary consists of a chancel, nave with north chapel and south porch, and west tower. The oldest part of the church appears to be the tower, which may date from the 13th century. The nave and chancel were built in the 14th century.

== Village life ==
The village has little in the way of amenities. It has a village hall and recreation ground, which is used for sports, leisure activities and events by local residents and clubs. A post office also operates once a week from the village hall.

It had one public house, the White Horse, that opened in the early 19th century but has closed in recent years. Former pubs included the White Hart at Burton End, certainly open by the mid-18th century but closed by 1933, and the Chequers at Streetly End, which opened in the early 19th century. The Chequers closed after a fire destroyed its thatched roof in 1985.

A National school replaced a Sunday School in the village in 1878. After 1937 older children attended Linton Village College, and the school closed in 1971 with primary children instead attending Balsham.
