= Abington Pigotts =

Village in Cambridgeshire, England

Coordinates: 52.083°N 0.096°W

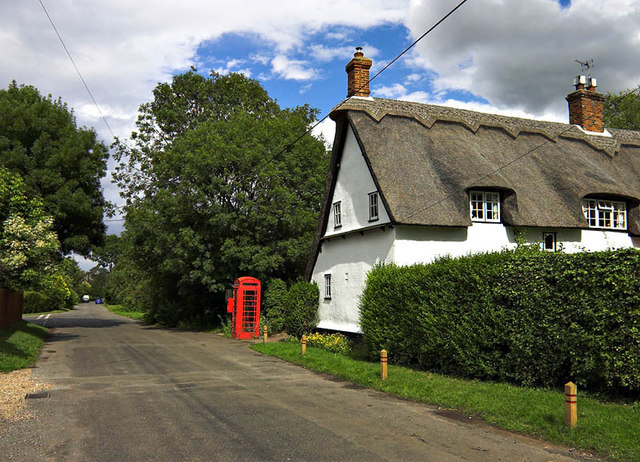

- Location within Cambridgeshire
- Population: 162 (2011 Census)
- OS grid reference: TL304444
- District: South Cambridgeshire
- Shire county: Cambridgeshire
- Region: East
- Country: England
- Sovereign state: United Kingdom
- Post town: ROYSTON
- Postcode district: SG8
- Dialling code: 01763
- Police: Cambridgeshire
- Fire: Cambridgeshire
- Ambulance: East of England
- UK Parliament: South Cambridgeshire

Abington Pigotts is a small village in Cambridgeshire, England about 4 miles (6 km) northwest of Royston, Hertfordshire.

== History ==
The parish of Abington Pigotts covers an area of 1,237 acres (501 ha). Roughly circular in shape it is surrounded by the parishes of Shingay, Wendy, Bassingbourn, Litlington, and Steeple Morden with its boundaries largely following minor waterways and streams.

A settlement from the early Iron Age has been found in the parish, covering around 20 acres a half mile north-west of the church, and was occupied through the Belgic and Roman periods. Pottery from the Anglo-Saxon era has also been found near the site.

In early medieval times Abington was sometimes listed as a hamlet of its southern neighbour, Litlington, despite possessing its own church from at least 1200.

Listed as Abintone in the Domesday Book of 1086, the name Abington means "estate associated with a man called Abba". In medieval times the village was variously known as Abington by Shingay, after its neighbouring village, and Abington in the Clay, from the heaviness of its soil, to distinguish it from The Abingtons in the south east of Cambridgeshire. The village became Abington Pigots by the 17th century after the Pykot or Pigott family that owned the manor from the 15th to the 19th century.

The village is notable as being the birthplace of Thomas Lester, who was prominent in the rural lacemaking industry in Bedfordshire, establishing a Lace Manufactory business which survived until the onset of machine-made lace in the early 20th century.

== Church ==
The parish church has been dedicated to St Michael (now St Michael and All Angels) since at least the 13th century and consists of a chancel, nave with south porch and north vestry, and west tower. The present building dates from the 14th century, though the chancel was reconstructed in 1875. The three-stage tower is 15th century, but traces of Romanesque carving from an earlier building can still be seen.

== Village life ==
The high street consists of a number of small 18th- and 19th-century timber-framed cottages. The largest building on the high street is the village's one pub, The Pig and Abbott, an early 18th-century inn which was known as the Darby and Joan from the early 19th century until the 1980s. The pub was put up for sale in June 2025 and subsequently closed. A village hall was opened in 1926.

A schoolroom was built on the road to the church in around 1850 with the children taught by the wives of the local craftsmen. The number of pupils remained around 40 for the rest of the 19th century but had dropped to 15 in the 1920s. In 1926 older children were sent instead to Bassingbourn with junior children following in 1933. The school reopened on a different site in 1939 but closed again in 1954. Primary children now attend the school in Steeple Morden before moving to Bassingbourn Village College.

== See also ==
- List of places in Cambridgeshire
