= Whaddon, Cambridgeshire =

Village in Cambridgeshire, England

Coordinates: 52.0998°N 0.0230°W

Whaddon
- Location within Cambridgeshire
- Population: 481 (2001); 489 (2011)
- OS grid reference: TL3546
- District: South Cambridgeshire
- Shire county: Cambridgeshire
- Region: East
- Country: England
- Sovereign state: United Kingdom
- Post town: Royston
- Postcode district: SG8
- Dialling code: 01223
- Police: Cambridgeshire
- Fire: Cambridgeshire
- Ambulance: East of England

Whaddon is a village and civil parish in South Cambridgeshire, England, 6 kilometres (3.7 mi) north of Royston.

== History ==
The parish of Whaddon covers an area of 1,538 acres (622 ha). Its entire western boundary follows the Roman Ermine Street (now the A1198), separating it from Bassingbourn and Wendy, and its northern border follows the River Cam (or Rhee), dividing it from Wimpole and Orwell. A stream separates it from Kneesworth to the south, and field boundaries from Melbourn to the east.

Much of Whaddon was formerly part of the estate of Wimpole Hall, and the hall's South Avenue, originally two double rows of elms planted in 1720 (now oak and lime), stretches 2 kilometres across the parish to Ermine Street. The Basin, an octagonal pool of around 150 metres in diameter, was added in 1721 just south of the river but was cleared a few decades later and filled with soil in 1968.

In 1812, an Act authorised the creation of a canal running from Whaddon to Sawston as part of the Stort Navigation, but the canal was never dug.

Listed as Wadone in the Domesday Book of 1086, the name "Waddon" means "hill where wheat is grown".

== Church ==
The parish church of St Mary consists of a chancel, five-bay aisled and clerestoried nave, south porch, and west tower. The chancel is the oldest part of the present building, dating from the end of the 13th century. The nave and tower were added in the late 14th century. It is a grade I listed building. In June 2019 the lead from the roof was stolen, but by 2021 it had been replaced using stainless steel, with funding from Historic England, the Amey Community Fund, Cambridgeshire Historic Churches Trust and local crowdsourcing.

== Village life ==
In 1875, the Earl of Hardwicke built a school in the village. Numbers fell until in 1924 secondary pupils were sent to Meldreth and Bassingbourn. Finally in 1962 primary pupils were transferred to Orwell Petersfield school and the Whaddon school was closed. The building now serves as the village hall.

Whaddon has its own unique Whitsun tradition. This involves singing a rather unusual song around the village before and on Whit Sunday itself. The tradition seems to have died out at the beginning of the 20th century, but was revived once for the coronation of King George VI in 1937, and was revived as a regular event in 2005.

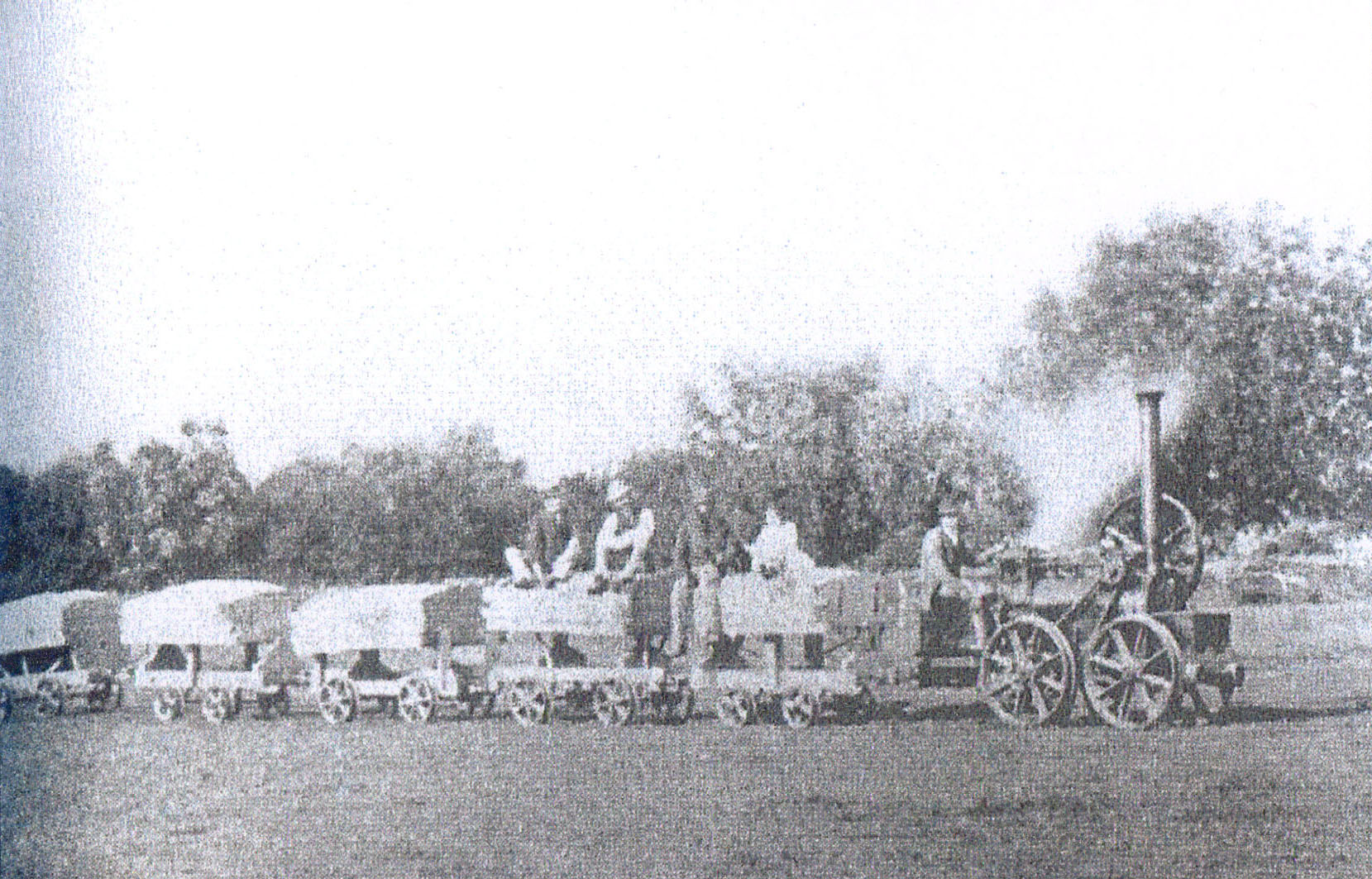
Coprolite train between Meldreth and Whaddon, ca 1880

There are no longer any pubs in Whaddon. Between 1841 and around 1900 The Pickering Arms was open in the village, becoming a farmhouse after it closed and burning down in around 1970. The Home served coprolite workers at Whaddon Green for several decades in the late 19th century. Though originally part of Melbourn, The Queen Adelaide opened south of Whaddon Green in around 1900, closing in 1956.

A travellers' site is located on the western side of the village. South Cambridgeshire has recently announced that the site is to be expanded and improved in a £1.4 million development project.
