= Croydon, Cambridgeshire =

Village in Cambridgeshire, England

Coordinates: 52.13°N 0.08°W

Croydon
- Location within Cambridgeshire
- Population: 235 (2011)
- OS grid reference: TL314497
- District: South Cambridgeshire
- Shire county: Cambridgeshire
- Region: East
- Country: England
- Sovereign state: United Kingdom
- Post town: ROYSTON
- Postcode district: SG8
- Dialling code: 01223
- Police: Cambridgeshire
- Fire: Cambridgeshire
- Ambulance: East of England

Croydon is a small village and civil parish in South Cambridgeshire, England. It is 10 miles (16 km) south-west of Cambridge and immediately west of the A1198 road (the Roman Ermine Street). The population in 2001 was 221 people, increasing to 235 at the 2011 Census. The site of the deserted medieval village of Clopton is in Croydon parish, which was formerly known as Croydon-cum-Clopton.

== History ==
The village's name was spelled Crauudene in the 1086 Domesday Book – it is derived from the Old English crawe and denu, meaning 'valley of the crows'. The parish is now known as Croydon, but it used to be called 'Croydon-with-Clopton' or 'Croydon-cum-Clopton'.

In 1086, about 28 peasants lived at Croydon. The separate vills of Croydon and Clopton were joined in 1561 and Croydon's population may have increased to around 140 people early in the 17th century, but fell to 90 during the reign of Charles II. Open fields surrounding Croydon village were enclosed for pasture around 1640, but from the late 18th century arable farming recommenced.

Current-day Croydon grew up along a street which runs east–west along the ridge to the north of the parish. Some timber-framed houses dating from the late 17th or early 18th centuries still stand, though most of the cottages date from the early 19th century. The main route through the parish followed a terrace along the steep hillside towards Tadlow. The track, called 'Royston road', was improved and incorporated into the Cambridge-Biggleswade turnpike, later became the A603 and it has now been downgraded to the B1042. Croydon Old Lane, in the north, went towards Hatley, while the current road up Croydon Hill to Hatley was first built in 1830.

=== Clopton ===
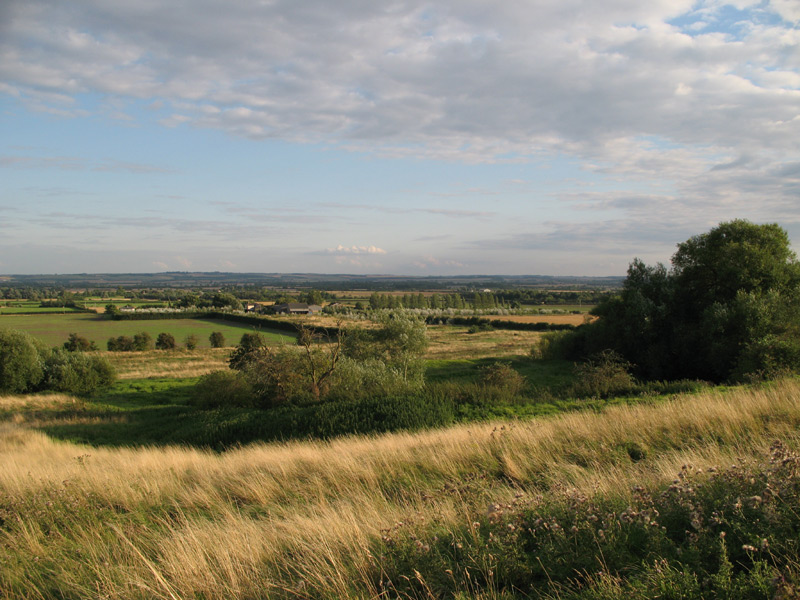
Site of Clopton village

Clopton was a medieval village which was deserted in the 16th century. It has been designated a Scheduled Ancient Monument and is west of Croydon village; a footpath known as the 'Clopton Way' runs past it. There were signs of Roman occupation at Clopton and a 30-acre (120,000 m^{2}) Anglo-Saxon village was in place by the 10th century. It was mentioned in the 1086 Domesday Book, when 18 peasants were in residence and a Friday market was granted in 1292 to Robert Hoo, lord of Clopton.

The village stood on a prominent ridge and was terraced into the hillside – archaeological excavations have revealed the former locations of a central church, two sites with moats and a probable mill. The site of the manor of Clopton, Clopton Bury, had a rectangular moat linked to the mill in the south-east of the village.

The village started to decline in the later Middle Ages and was deserted for good in the early 16th century after enclosure, begun around 1500, deprived the villagers of their livelihood. By 1524, the only households left belonged to the lady of the manor and five labourers. Today, earthworks outline the site of the village.

== Governance ==
Croydon parish council consists of seven councillors and a parish clerk. The parish is represented on South Cambridgeshire District Council by two councillors for the Gamlingay ward and on Cambridgeshire County Council by one councillor for the Gamlingay electoral division. It is in the parliamentary constituency of South Cambridgeshire, represented at the House of Commons by Pippa Heylings since 2024.

== Geography ==
It is 6 miles (9.7 km) north-west of Royston, 10 miles (16 km) south-west of the county town of Cambridge and 44 miles (71 km) north of London, a short distance west of what was the Roman Ermine Street, now the A1198 road. The village of Arrington is east of Croydon, Wendy is south-east and Hatley north-west. The River Cam (or Rhee) runs along the southern boundary of Croydon parish. The soil at Croydon is 'clayey' with a chalk and gault subsoil. The parish ranges from 22 metres, by the river, via the foot of a chalk down at 45 metres, to a northern plateau reaching 82 metres above sea level. It covers an area of 1,103 hectares.

== Demography ==
At the time of the 2001 census, Croydon parish had 221 residents living in 89 households. The ethnic group of 98.6% of people was white; 1.4% described themselves as Asian or Asian British. 79.5% were Christian, 1.4% followed another religion and 19.1% followed no religion or did not state one. Croydon parish had 208 inhabitants in 1801 and around 325 in the 1900s but in 1971 the population had fallen again to 205.

== Landmarks ==
A war memorial stands on Church Lane and commemorates Croydon men who were killed in the First and Second World Wars. Three buildings in the parish are listed: the parish church, a row of cottages along Larkins Road and a milestone along Tadlow Road.

== Religious sites ==
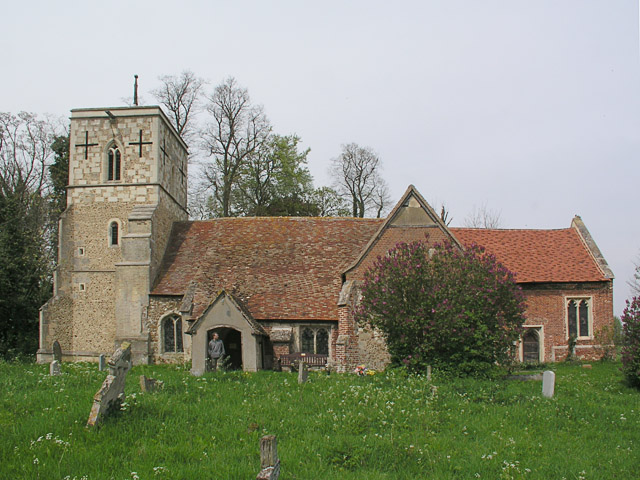
All Saints', Croydon

Croydon's church was established by the late 12th century and was dedicated to All Saints by at least 1520. It stands on a slope above the village street and has had problems with subsidence; it is constructed of brick and field stones in the Perpendicular style. In 1561 it was described as ampla et ornata and said to be in decay; Sir John Cage made efforts to improve it in the 1620s and Sir George Downing, 1st Baronet, rebuilt the chancel in brick and established a family vault, where he was subsequently buried. He founded Downing College, Cambridge, and Downing Street in London is named after him. There are some pictures and a description of the Grade II* church at the Cambridgeshire Churches website.

Another church was built at Clopton in the late 12th century on a terrace; it was reconsecrated in 1352 and measured around 40 feet (12 m) by 20 feet (6.1 m). It was in poor repair by 1561 and was turned over to agricultural use before 1660 and was demolished, with even the foundations removed.
