= List of monastic houses in Cambridgeshire =

The following is a list of monastic houses in Cambridgeshire, England.

Locations of monastic houses in Cambridgeshire
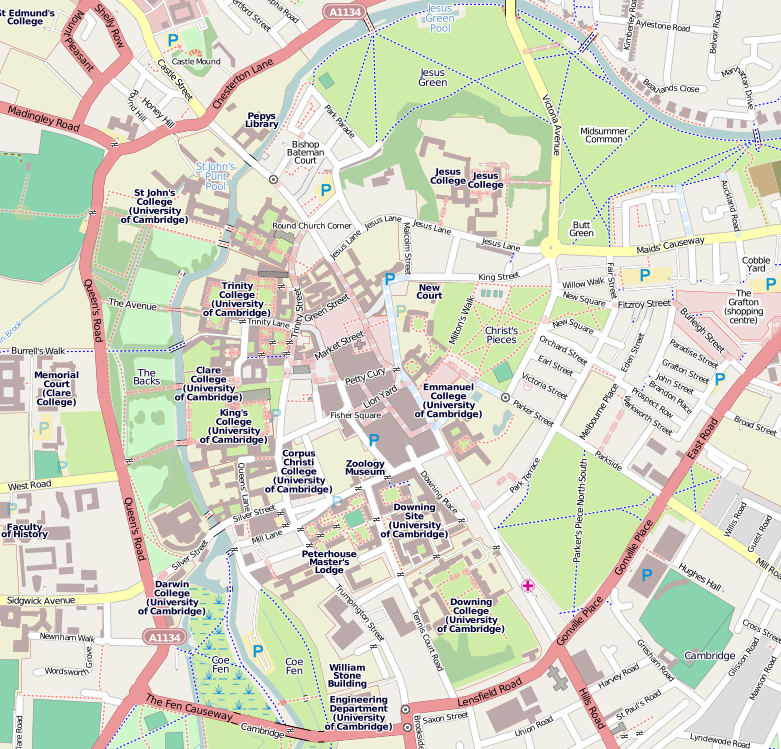
Locations of monastic houses in Cambridge
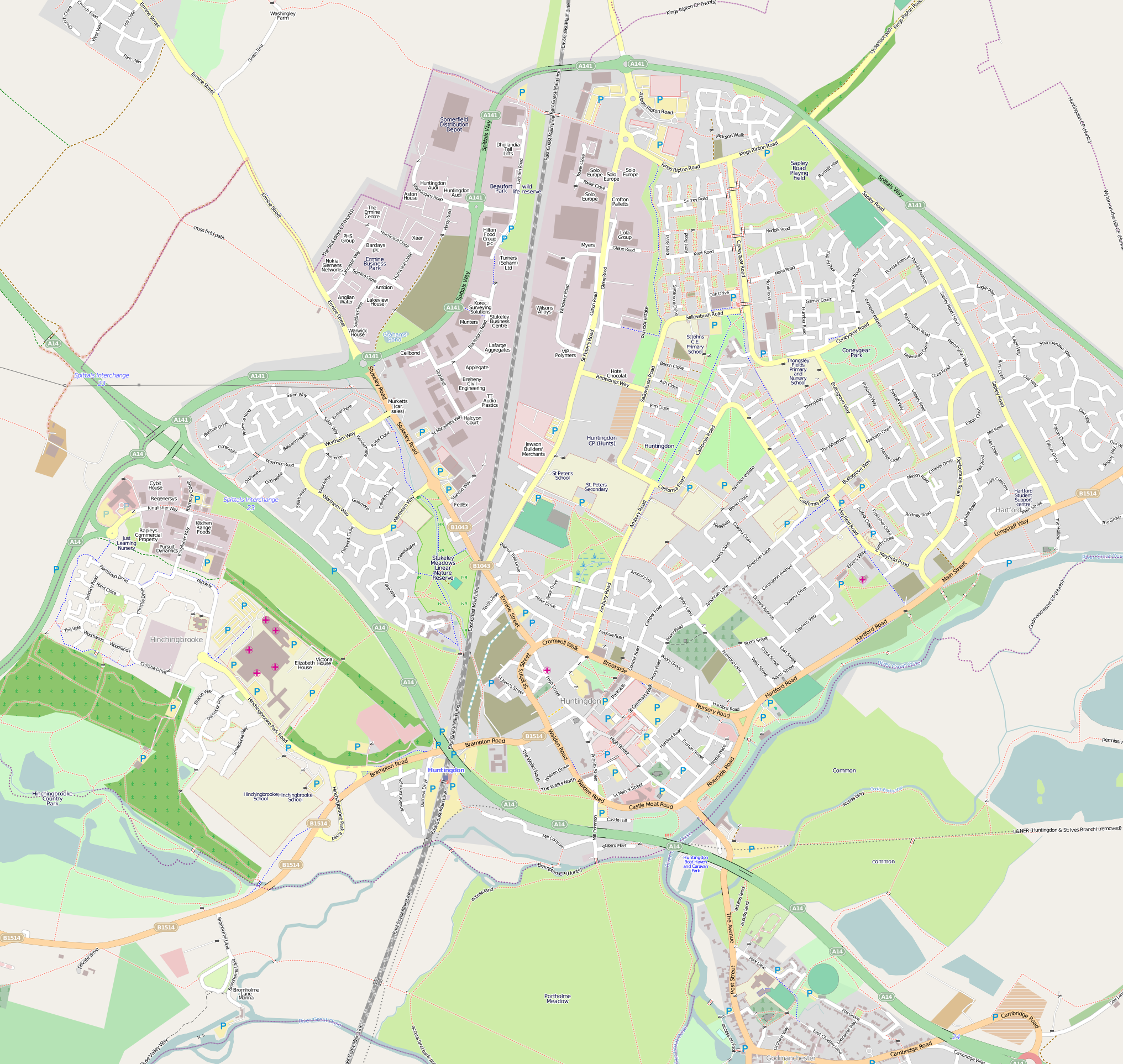
Locations of monastic houses in Huntingdon

Alien houses are included, as are smaller establishments such as cells and notable monastic granges (particularly those with resident monks), and also camerae of the military orders of monks (Knights Templar and Knights Hospitaller). Monastic hospitals are included where they had the status or function of an abbey, priory, or preceptor/commandery.

Abbreviations and key

Status of remains
| Symbol | Status |
|---|---|
| None | Ruins |
| * | Current monastic function |
| ^{+} | Current non-monastic ecclesiastic function (including remains incorporated into later structure) |
| ^ | Current non-ecclesiastic function (including remains incorporated into later structure) or redundant intact structure |
| ^{$} | Remains limited to earthworks etc. |
| ^{#} | No identifiable trace of the monastic foundation remains |
| ^{~} | Exact site of monastic foundation unknown |
| ^{≈} | Identification ambiguous or confused |

Locations with names in italics indicate possible duplication (misidentification with another location) or non-existent foundations (either erroneous reference or proposed foundation never implemented) or ecclesiastical establishments with a monastic name but lacking actual monastic connection.

Trusteeship
| EH | English Heritage |
| LT | Landmark Trust |
| NT | National Trust |

| Foundation | Image | Communities and provenance | Formal name or dedication and alternative names | References and location |
|---|---|---|---|---|
| Anglesey Priory ^, Lode, Cambridgeshire | | Augustinian Canons Regular founded 1135 by Henry I; initially established as a hospital; apparently becoming a priory c.1212 when endowed by Richard de Clare, Earl of Gloucester; dissolved before 7 August 1536; granted to John Hynde c.1538; remains incorporated into private house named 'Anglesey Abbey' 1591; (National Trust) | The Priory Church of the Blessed Virgin Mary and Saint Nicholas, Anglesey | 52°14′14″N 0°14′20″E |
| Barham Friary | | Crutched Friars founded before 1272 (or c.1293) apparently from Welnetham, Suffolk; later dependent on London; dissolved 1538; granted to Philip Paris c.1539, and later to John Millecent, Esq. chapel remained in use until house named 'Barham Hall' built on site 1830 | St Margaret ____________________; Barkham Priory; Bercham Priory | 52°05′25″N 0°17′47″E |
| Barnwell Priory, Cambridge | | Augustinian Canons Regular transferred from St Giles, Castle Hill, Lode; refounded c.1112 by Pain Peverel; plundered by townsmen 1381 dissolved 11 November 1538; granted to Anthony Brown c.1546; granted to Edward, Lord Clinton c.1552; ruins thoroughly destroyed 1810 | St Giles and St Andrew | 52°12′32″N 0°08′19″E |
| Cambridge Austin Friars | | Augustinian Friars (under the Limit of Cambridge) founded before 1289; transferred to new site (see immediately below) 1290 | | |
| Cambridge Austin Friars | | Augustinian Friars (under the Limit of Cambridge) transferred from earlier site (see above) 1290 by Geoffrey de Picheford | | 52°12′13″N 0°07′11″E |
| Cambridge Augustinian Priory, Castle Hill, Lode | | Augustinian Canons Regular founded c.1092 by Picot, Lord of Bourn, Sheriff of Cambridgeshire, and Hugolina, his wife; transferred to new site at Barnwell Priory c.1112 | St Giles | 52°12′32″N 0°08′19″E |
| Cambridge, Bethlehemite Friary (?) | | Bethlehemite Friars documented 1257 — probably never established | | |
| Cambridge Blackfriars | | Dominican Friars (under the Visitation of Cambridge) founded before 1238 (or 1237-42/c.1258); dissolved 1538; granted to Edward Erlington and Humphrey Metcalf c.1543; Emmanuel College built on site 1584 (see Cambridge University) | | 52°12′14″N 0°07′26″E |
| Blackfriars, Cambridge * | | Dominican Friars founded 1938; extant | The Priory of Saint Michael the Archangel, Cambridge | 52°12′50″N 0°06′33″E |
| Cambridge, Buckingham College Priory | | Benedictine monks dependent on Crowland, Lincolnshire; transferred from Ely Hostel 1428; dissolved c.1540; refounded 1542 as the College of St Mary Magdalene | Monk's College | 52°12′37″N 0°06′58″E |
| Cambridge, Ely Hostel Priory | | Benedictine monks dependent on Ely & others; founded 1321 for brothers studying at Ely; transferred to new site at Spaldyngs Inn (see immediately below) | | |
| Cambridge, Border Hostel Priory | | Benedictine monks dependent on Ely & others; transferred from Ely Hostel (see immediately above) 1350 to Spaldyngs Inn (later renamed Border Hostel); transferred to new site at Cambridge, Buckingham College 1428 | | |
| Cambridge Greyfriars | | Franciscan Friars Minor, Conventual (under the Custody of Cambridge) founded c.1226, "by the bounty of Edward I", on the site of an old synagogue loaned to the Franciscans and adjoining land; rebuilt before 1330; dissolved 1538 (the friars departed prior to the enforcement); sold to the executors of Lady Frances Sidney 1544/5; granted to Trinity College, Cambridge 1546; Sidney Sussex College, Cambridge founded on site 1595 | | 52°12′28″N 0°07′12″E |
| Cambridge Pied Friars | | Pied Friars founded 1256(?) when some friars appear to have remained in the move of the Carmelites from Chesterton to Newnham; transferred to new site (see immediately below) 1273 | | |
| Cambridge Pied Friars | | Pied Friars (community founded at earlier site (see immediately above) 1256(?)); transferred here between 1273 and 1279 on land bought 1273 by the proctor of the Order of Blessed Mary in England; dissolved after 1319 | | 52°12′44″N 0°06′49″E |
| Cambridge White Friars | | Carmelite Friars (community founded at Chesterton 1247 (or 1249)); transferred here 1249 via Newnham; dissolved 1538; granted to John Eyer c.1544 | | 52°12′11″N 0°06′53″E |
| Cambridge — Friars of the Sack | | Friars of the Sack founded 1258 at the house of John le Rus, mayor of Cambridge, from funding by Edward I; intended by the Pope to be passed to the Gilbertines 1290, but plan abandoned because the friars were still in residence; granted to Peterhouse 1307; site now occupied by Fitzwilliam Museum | | 52°12′02″N 0°07′05″E |
| Cambridge — St Mary's Friars | | Friars of St Mary founded c.1279 dissolved after 1319 | | |
| Cambridge — St Edmund's Priory | | Gilbertine Canons founded before 1291, St Edmund's chapel granted by 'the bounty or gift of' B_ son of Walter; originally intended by the Pope to be located at the friary of the Sack, but it was still occupied; dissolved 1539; granted to Edward Ebrington (Erlington?) and Humphrey Metcalf c.1543 | The Priory Church of Saint Edmund, Cambridge | 52°11′58″N 0°07′12″E |
| Cambridge — St Radegund's Priory | | Benedictine nuns cell founded c.1133-8 by John de Cranden, Prior of Ely with endowment confirmed by Stephen; destroye' 1313, 1376 and 1389; dissolved 1496 for the founded of Jesus College, Cambridge, which currently occupies the site | The Priory Church of the Blessed Virgin Mary and Saint Radegund | 52°12′33″N 0°07′29″E |
| Chatteris Abbey | | Benedictine nuns founded 1006-16 by Ednoth, Bishop of Dorchester with his sister Aelfwen (or 980 by Alfwen, wife of Ethelstan, Earl of the East Angles); destroyed 1306-10; dissolved 3 September 1538; granted to Edward, Lord Clinton c.1551 | The Abbey Church of the Blessed Virgin Mary, Chatteris ____________________; Chateris Abbey | 52°27′11″N 0°02′56″E |
| Chesterton Whitefriars | | Carmelite Friars founded 1247 (or 1249) by Edward I and other nobles; transferred to new site at Newnham 1249 (or 1251-6) | | 52°12′57″N 0°08′18″E |
| Cherry Hinton | | Bridgettine monks and nuns charter for founded 1406 — house never established | | |
| Chippenham Preceptory | | Knights Hospitaller — under Clerkenwell, Middlesex founded 1184 by William de Mandeville, Earl of Essex; apparently annexed to Carbrook before 1489; dissolved 1535; granted to Sir Edward North 1540/1 | | 52°17′38″N 0°25′58″E |
| Denny Abbey | | Benedictine monks cell dependent on Ely; founded 1159 by Robert, Chamberlain of Conan IV, Duke of Brittany; Knights Templar preceptory founded 1169; became hospital-preceptory c.1170; dissolved 1308; committed to Master Roger of Wingfield 3 June 1309; Franciscan nuns refounded 1423 by Mary de St Pol, Countess of Pembroke (Mary de St Paulo, widow of Adomare, Earl of Pembroke) on the site of a cell of Ely; dissolved before 28 October 1539; granted to Edward Erlington 1540, though nuns apparently continued to be in occupation to 1547; estate exchanged for other land owned by the King; in Crown ownership; passed to City of London 1628 to offset the debts of the King; converted to farmhouse 18th century; many changes of hands 17th-19th century; estate bought by Pembroke College and vested it into the care of the Ministry of Works 1947; part of the Farmland Museum since 1997; (EH) | The Abbey Church of Saint James and Saint Leonard, Denny (1159-69); The Nunnery of the Blessed Virgin Mary and Saint Clare (1342-1539); ____________________; Denney Abbey; Denney Preceptory | 52°17′40″N 0°11′13″E |
| Duxford Preceptory | | Knights Templar founded 1273; committed to Master Roger of Wingfield 3 June 1309; passed to Knights Hospitaller by John le Clerk of Wilbraham 21 December 1313, though no preceptory or camera was maintained there; sacked 15 June 1381 during the Peasants' Revolt; 16th century Temple Farm on site | Duxford Temple | 52°05′37″N 0°09′38″E |
| Eltisley Priory | | Benedictine nuns founded 9th century(?); apparently destroyed in raids by the Danes c.870; Benedictine nuns founded before 1066; dissolved before 1087 | | 52°13′13″N 0°08′39″W |
| Ely Cathedral Priory ^{+} | | ?nuns (/and monks? — double monastery?) founded c.673; destroyed by the Danes 870; secular canons refounded 9th century; Benedictine monks founded 970; dissolved 1539; episcopal diocesan cathedral founded 1109; extant | The Abbey Church of Saint Peter and Saint Etheldreda The Cathedral Church of the Holy and Undivided Trinity and Saint Etheldreda | 52°23′55″N 0°15′48″E |
| Fordham Priory ^{#} | | Gilbertine Canons founded before 1227, built by Henry, Dean of Fordham with endowments by Hugh Malebisse; dissolved 1 September 1538; granted to Philip Parry 1540/1; site now occupied by private house named 'Fordham Abbey' | The Priory Church of Saint Peter and Saint Mary Magdalene, Fordham | 52°18′03″N 0°23′22″E |
| Great Wilbraham Preceptory | | Knights Templar founded 1170; dissolved 1308-12; Knights Hospitaller founded 1312; dissolved c.1350 house named 'Wilbraham Temple' built on or near preceptory site 17th century | Wilbraham Temple | 52°11′51″N 0°16′15″E |
| Hinchingbrook Priory | | Benedictine nuns founded before 1087 purportedly by William the Conqueror to replace Eltisely; dissolved 1536; granted to Richard Williams (alias Cromwell) 1537/8; remains incorporated into 16th century Hinchingbrooke House built on site | The Priory Church of Saint James, Hinchinbrook The Priory of Saint James without Huntingdon | 52°19′40″N 0°12′01″W |
| Horningsea Monastery | | early Saxon monastery destroyed in raids by the Danes 870 | Biggin Abbey | 52°14′30″N 0°11′06″E |
| Holme Friary | | unknown order documented 1260 | | 52°29′39″N 0°12′16″W |
| Huntingdon Austin Friars ^{#} | | Augustinian Friars (under the Limit of Cambridge) founded August 1258; destroyed 1286; rebuilt dissolved 1539; Cromwell House built on site: birthplace of Oliver Cromwell | St Mary | 52°19′57″N 0°11′12″W |
| Huntingdon Priory, earlier site | | Benedictine monks dependent on Thorney; founded before 973 by King Edgar; dissolved before 1086; transferred to new site out of the town (see immediately below); church granted to that new priory | | 52°19′49″N 0°11′05″W |
| Huntingdon Priory | | Benedictine monks transferred from earlier site (see immediately above); Augustinian Canons Regular 1086-91; possible secular college 1087-1106; Augustinian Canons Regular refounded c.1108(?); dissolved 11 July 1538 | St Mary | 52°20′01″N 0°10′44″W |
| Ickleton Priory ^{#} | | Benedictine nuns founded 1190 by Aubrey de Vere, Earl of Oxford (or by a member of the Valoignes family); dissolved 1536; granted to Thomas Goodrich, Bishop of Ely 1538/9 now on site of Abbey Farm | The Priory Church of Saint Mary Magdalene, Ickleton ____________________; Ikelington Priory | 52°04′13″N 0°10′23″E |
| Isleham Priory | | Benedictine monks alien house: daughter of St-Jacut-de-Mer; founded 1086 (or c.1100); monks moved 1254 to sister cell at Linton; dissolved 1414; granted to Pembroke College, Cambridge which converted the church into a barn and demolished the monastery; (EH) | The Priory Church of Saint Margaret of Antioch, Isleham ____________________; Isleham Cell | ^{&} 52°20′34″N 0°24′34″E |
| Linton Priory | | Benedictine monks alien house: daughter of St-Jacut-de-Mer: granted before 1163 "by gift of an ancestor of Alan, son of Ferlant"; monks transferred from Isleham, 1254; granted to Pembroke Hall, Cambridge; conventual until 1414; restored late-19th century | St Mary the Virgin | 52°05′47″N 0°16′43″E |
| Marmont Priory | | Gilbertine Canons founded before 1204 (before c.1203) by Ralph de Hauvill; referred to as a cell of Watton 1535; dissolved 1538; granted to Percival Bowes and John Mosyer 1567/8; | The Priory Church of the Blessed Virgin Mary, Marmont ____________________; Mirmaud Priory; Marmonde Priory; Welle Priory; Welles Priory; Upwell Priory | 52°35′19″N 0°12′14″E |
| Newnham Whitefriars | | Carmelite Friars (community founded at Chesterton 1247 (1249)); transferred 1249 (or 1251-6) from Chesterton; site granted by Michael Malherb; occupied until c.1292; transferred to new site in Milne Street, Cambridge | | 52°11′33″N 0°06′19″E |
| Oxney Priory | | Benedictine monks priory cell dependent on Peterborough; founded before 1272; dissolved 1538 | St Mary | 52°35′33″N 0°11′35″W |
| Peterborough Abbey ^{+} | | Saxon monastery founded c.655, built by Saxulf, a monk, and Peada, King of Mercia and his brother Wulfhere; monks 655-6; Benedictine? monks refounded? c.673 destroyed in raids by the Danes 870, derelict to c.966; Benedictine monks refounded c.966; rebuilt 966-72 by Ethelwold, Bishop of Winchester with King Edgar and St Dunstan dissolved 29 November 1539; episcopal diocesan cathedral founded 1540; extant | The Cathedral Church of Saint Peter, Saint Paul and Saint Andrew, Peterborough ____________________; Medeshamstede Abbey; Peterburgh Abbey | 52°34′21″N 0°14′22″W |
| Ramsey Abbey | | Benedictine monks founded 969, site offered by Aethelwine to St Oswald, Bishop of Worcester; dissolved 22 November 1539; church modified and incorporated into mansion named 'Ramsey House' built c.1600; in use as a comprehensive school from mid-1980s; (NT) | The Abbey Church of Saint Mary and Saint Benedict, Ramsey | 52°26′56″N 0°06′08″W |
| St Ives Priory | | Benedictine monks priory cell dependent on Ramsey church dedicated by Bishop Siward dissolved 1539; house built on site | St Ive | 52°19′19″N 0°04′18″W |
| St Neots Priory | | Benedictine monks cell dependent on Ely; founded 974 by Earl Alric and his wife Ethelfleda; cell of Bec-Hellouin 1113; new church dedicated 1113; independent 1412; dissolved 1539; site currently occupied by Market Place car park | The Priory Church of St Neot, St Neots ____________________; Eynesbury Priory | 52°13′39″N 0°16′14″W |
| Sawtry Abbey | | Cistercian monks — from Warden, Bedfordshire; founded 1147 by Simon de Senlis, Earl of Huntingdon and Northampton; dissolved 1536-37 | The Blessed Virgin Mary ____________________; Sawtrey Abbey | 52°25′38″N 0°14′24″W |
| Shingay Preceptory | | Knights Hospitaller founded 1144-62 Walter, first prior of the Hospitallers in England on land purportedly granted by Sibylla de Raynes (daughter of the Earl of Montgomery) and the Earl of Gloucester; Sisters of St. John nuns' cell removed to Sisters of St John Priory, Buckland, Somerset c.1180; dissolved; granted to Richard Longe 1540/1 | Shengay Preceptory | 52°06′30″N 0°05′19″W |
| Soham Monastery | | Saxon monks founded c.630 or 631 by St. Felix, first bishop of the East Saxons (who is purported to have had his see here); destroyed in raids by the Danes 870 or 871; parish church of St Andrew purportedly occupies the site | Seham Monastery | 52°20′01″N 0°20′13″E |
| Spinney Abbey | | Augustinian Canons Regular founded between 1216 and 1228 by Hugh de Malebisse and Beatrix his wife; dependent on Ely 1449; Benedictine monks 1449; dissolved 1538; granted to Sir Edward North 1544/5; site now occupied by a house and farm | Priory of St Mary and the Holy Cross, Spinney ____________________; Spinney Priory | 52°19′20″N 0°16′47″E |
| Stamford — St Michael's Priory | | Benedictine nuns dependent on Peterborough founded c.1155 by William of Waterville, Abbot of Peterborough; with regular priests or brethren until after 1323; appears to have claimed itself to be Cistercian before 1268; dissolved 1536 | St Mary and St Michael ____________________; Stamford Baron Priory; Stamford St Michael's Priory | 52°38′49″N 0°28′58″W |
| Stamford St Sepulchre Priory | | Augustinian Canons Regular — Holy Sepulchre founded c.1170(?) until before 1189; Augustinian Canons Regular under patronage of Peterborough from before 1189; hospital founded, continuing until after 1227 | | |
| Stonely Priory ^{$} | | possibly initially a hospital Augustinian Canons Regular founded c.1180 by William de Mandeville (according to Leland, but more likely William, Earl of Essex, possibly hospital until after 1220; dissolved 1536; leased to Oliver Leder of Great Staughton in 1538; granted to him and his wife Frances 1544 | The Priory Church of the Blessed Virgin Mary, Stonely | 52°17′40″N 0°22′05″W |
| Swaffham Bulbeck Priory | | Benedictine nuns founded c.1150-63 by Isabel the Bolebec; dissolved 1536; granted to the Thomas Goodrich, Bishop of Ely 1538/9 | The Nunnery of Saint Mary, Swaffham ____________________; Swaffham Nunnery; Swafam Nunnery | 52°14′31″N 0°16′51″E |
| Swavesey Priory | | Benedictine monks alien house: dependent on St Serge Abbey, Angers: granted by Count Alan Rufus; founded before 1086; granted to the Carthusians of Coventry 1411; a private residence named 'The Priory' is supposedly situated on or near the site | St Andrew | 52°18′21″N 0°00′12″W |
| Thirling Cell | | Augustinian Canons Regular — grange or cell | Thirling Priory | 52°35′45″N 0°11′01″E (approx) |
| Thorney Abbey ^{+} | | anchorites or hermits before 972; Benedictine monks founded 972 by the first abbot of Peterborough; dissolved 1539; granted to John, Earl of Bedford 1549/50; church now in parochial use | The Priory Church of Saint Mary and Saint Botulph, Thorney | 52°37′14″N 0°06′26″W |
| Trokenholt Priory | | hermitage Benedictine monks cell dependent on Thorney; founded 1154-69 (during the reign of Henry II): hermitage and chapel granted to Thorney by Nigel, Bishop of Ely; dissolved 14th century(?) | | |
| Waterbeach Abbey | | Franciscan nuns founded 1294 by Denise Munchensey; gradually removed to Denny 1351 due to flooding; dissolved 1351 | The Nunnery of the Piety of Our Lady and Saint Clare The Nunnery of Our Lady of Pity and Saint Clare | 52°15′46″N 0°11′38″E |
| Whittlesey Mere Friary | | hermit friars (Note: Whittlesey Mere: Calendar Patent Rolls 1258-66); apparently not Austin friars; uncertain order and foundation, no further reference | | |
| Wittering Priory | | order and foundation unknown — priory recorded extant 1308; reference to documentary evidence of its existence 1273 possibly refers to Southorpe Hospital | | 52°36′20″N 0°27′03″W (suggested) |

The following locations in Cambridgeshire lack known monastic connections:

- Barnwell Priory Abbey: (The Church of Saint Andrew-the-Less, Barnwell), built adjacent to former Priory Church, called 'The Abbey Church'
- Buckden Abbey: Elizabethan mansion

== See also ==
- List of monastic houses in England
