= Colin Welch =

English political journalist (1924–1997)

- Born: James Colin Ross Welch; 23 April 1924; Cambridgeshire, England
- Died: 28 January 1997 (aged 72); Froxfield, Wiltshire, England
- Education: Stowe School; Peterhouse, Cambridge
- Occupations: Political journalist; Literary critic
- Employers: Glasgow Herald; The Daily Telegraph
- Relatives: Florence Welch (granddaughter)
- Military career
- Allegiance: United Kingdom
- Branch: British Army
- Service years: 1944-1945
- Unit: Royal Warwickshire Regiment
- Conflicts: World War II: Normandy landings

James Colin Ross Welch (23 April 1924 – 28 January 1997) was an English political journalist. According to Richard West in his obituary of Welch, he was a "strong and eloquent advocate of individual liberty against the power of government".

Welch, son of James William Welch and Irene Margherita (née Paton), was born in Cambridgeshire, England, at Ickleton Abbey, which his grandfather, also James Welch, had owned since 1900 and which estate the family farmed until 1933; they were also Shire horse breeders. James William Welch was among the principal landowners at Ickleton in 1929.

Welch was educated at Stowe and Peterhouse, Cambridge, and joined the Royal Warwickshire Regiment in 1944, taking part in the Normandy landings in June and fighting until injured in March 1945. He joined the Glasgow Herald in 1948, and then The Daily Telegraph in 1950, when he became a parliamentary correspondent for the newspaper, advocating his economic liberal views for three decades. He was appointed Deputy Editor of the newspaper in 1964, serving until 1980. He died in January 1997 in Froxfield, Wiltshire.

He was known for being one of the harshest critics of Enid Blyton in the 1950s and 1960s, especially her Noddy series, which he believed was having a negative impact on child development in post-war Britain. In 1958 he published a scathing article in Encounter in which he remarked that it was "hard to see how a diet of Miss Blyton could help with the 11-plus or even with the Cambridge English Tripos", describing Noddy as an "unnaturally priggish ... sanctimonious...witless, spiritless, snivelling, sneaking doll."

His granddaughter, by his son Nicholas Russell Welch, an advertising executive, is musician Florence Welch.

== Publications ==
- "Policies and Parliament", Rebirth of Britain : a Symposium of Essays by Eighteen Writers, London: Pan, 1964, pp. 45–57.
- "Dear Little Noddy", Encounter, January 1958, pp. 18–22.
- Odd Thing About the Colonel and Other Pieces, London: Bellew Publishing, 1997.
