= St Mary Magdalene Church, Ickleton =

Church in Cambridgeshire, England

Coordinates: 52°04′23″N 0°10′46″E

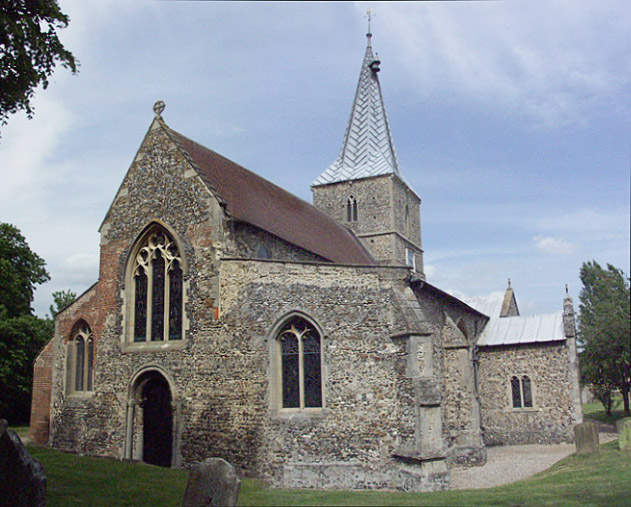
St Mary Magdalene Church

St Mary Magdalene Church is the Church of England parish church in the village of Ickleton in Cambridgeshire. The church is a Grade I listed building. Its parish is part of a combined benefice with those of St Peter's, Duxford and SS Mary and John, Hinxton.

== History ==
Dedicated to St Mary Magdalene, it is early Norman in date, built of rubble and flint with Barnack limestone dressings. It was originally dedicated to St Mary the Virgin but was later rededicated to Ickleton Priory's patron saint. Nikolaus Pevsner wrote that the church's Norman interior "has few equals" in England and "is far too little known".

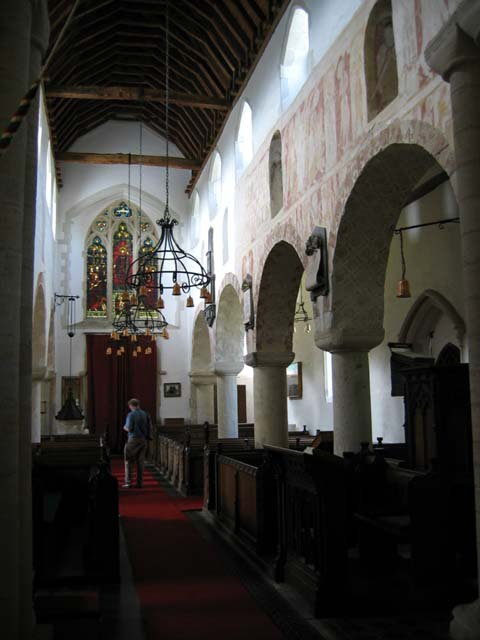
Looking west inside the nave, showing the 11th-century Norman north arcade and aisle (right), 12th-century frescoes (above right) and Perpendicular Gothic west window (left)

The church was built in the late 11th or early 12th century with a nave, a chancel and a central tower over the crossing between the two. The nave was built with a clerestory, a round-arched west door, north and south aisles and a round-arched four-bay arcade between the nave and each aisle. Some of the columns are re-used Roman ones, each carved from a single stone. The others are Norman copies of the Roman work. Most of the original Norman features have survived the church's later enlargement and embellishment.

Late in the 12th century a set of frescoes was painted in the nave, arranged in two tiers above the arcades. There are four scenes of Christ's Passion, and three paintings showing the martyrdoms of St Peter, St Andrew and St Lawrence.

In the 13th century the crossing was given pointed Early English Gothic east and west arches, but their Norman responds were retained. The church has a south transept, the date of which is unknown. There used to be a north transept, making the church cruciform, but at some date it was demolished. The blocked north arch of the crossing remains as evidence. The north and south arches are late 13th or early 14th century.

Much Decorated Gothic work was done to the church early in the 14th century. The height of the tower was increased: English Heritage says this was in about 1340 but Nikolaus Pevsner dates the bell-openings to about 1300. The south aisle was rebuilt, widened and a rib vaulted south porch was added. New windows were inserted in the south transept and the arch between the transept and the south aisle was rebuilt. The octagonal font may also be 14th-century. The nave clerestory was increased in height and given a new roof, and the lead-covered broach spire was added. Some 14th-century glass survives in the windows of the south aisle. Also 14th-century is the wall painting of the Doom with Christ and the Virgin Mary over the chancel arch. The church was rededicated in 1351, so this may be the date when this phase of building was completed.

In the middle of the 15th century the chancel was rebuilt and a Perpendicular Gothic north chapel and vestry were added. Also Perpendicular Gothic are the west windows of the nave and north aisle. The church was refurnished with a Perpendicular wooden rood screen, new pews and stalls. The poppyhead ends of two of the pews are original. The church was rededicated again in 1452.

In the 18th century there was some rebuilding work, and by 1791 the north chapel, vestry and transept had been demolished. By 1877 St Mary Magdalene's churchyard was no longer sufficient for parish burials, so in 1883 a new cemetery and funeral chapel were opened beside Brookhampton Street just north of the village. The chapel is a Gothic Revival building in an Early English style with lancet windows.

In 1882–85 the chancel was rebuilt, retaining the 15th-century piscina but adding Gothic Revival sedilia. The roof of the south transept was destroyed by fire in 1979 and has been replaced. It was cleaning work after the fire that discovered the 12th-century frescoes in the nave. These had been painted over for centuries, presumably since the Reformation in the 16th century.

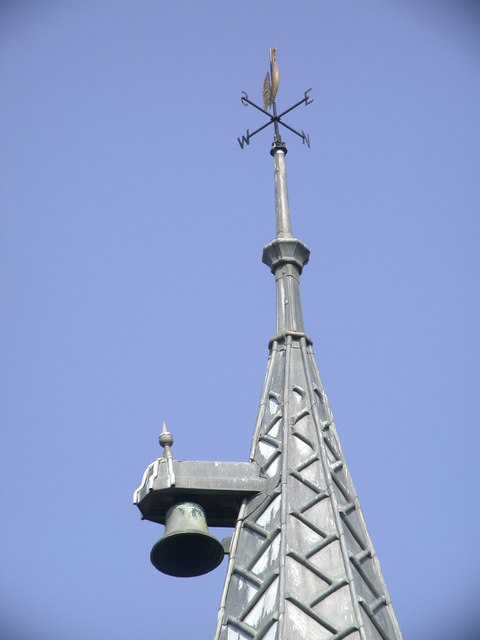
The Tudor Sanctus bell near the top of the spire

== Bells ==
After the Dissolution of Ickleton Priory it was recorded that the church tower had three bells. In 1552 during the Edwardine Reformation the church was recorded as having four bells and a Sanctus bell. By 1742 the tower had a ring of six bells and there were two Sanctus bells unusually positioned on the outside of the spire.

Much work was done to the bells in the 18th century. Thomas Newman, who had bell-foundries at Norwich and Cambridge, cast what are now the fourth and seventh bells in 1729. Thomas Lester of the Whitechapel Bell Foundry cast the tenor bell in 1751. William Chapman, also of the Whitechapel Bell Foundry, cast what is now the fifth bell in 1781.

By the late 19th century there was only one Sanctus bell on the outside of the spire. It had been cast in about 1500 by an unknown bellfounder. It was used as a curfew bell or a fire bell, and later was linked to the church clock to sound the hours.

The six bells were restored in 1907 but within 20 years their frame had collapsed and the tenor bell had fallen and broken. In 1927 Gillett & Johnston of Croydon, Surrey recast all six bells and added a new treble and second bell, increasing the ring to eight.
