= St Mary and St John Church, Hinxton =

Church in Cambridgeshire, England

Coordinates: 52.0847°N 0.1835°E

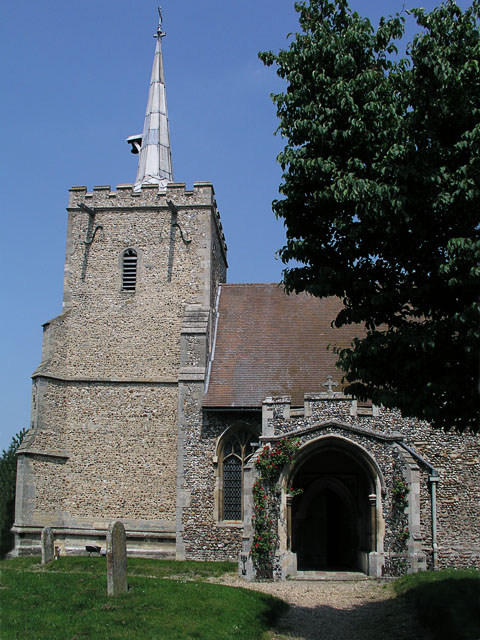
St Mary and St John

St Mary and St John Church is a Church of England parish church in the village of Hinxton in Cambridgeshire.

It is a medieval flint and rubble church in the early-English style. It consists of a chancel, nave, south aisle, south chapel, south porch and a western tower with lead-covered spire that contains a clock and two bells that were first hung in 1903. The chancel and nave date from around 1200, while the south aisle and chapel are 14th-century, the latter being built by bequest of Thomas Skelton whose memorial is in the church. Other parts of the grade II* listed building are between 15th and 19th centuries.

The first record of a church on the site dates from 1092 when the local sheriff Picot of Cambridge granted it to what later became Barnwell Priory in Cambridge.

In 1930 the vicarage was joined with that of neighbouring Ickleton, though resentment among locals resulted in the decision being reversed in 1955. The advowson has been in the possession of Jesus College, Cambridge since 1558. It is now part of a combined benefice with St Peter's, Duxford and St Mary Magdalene Church, Ickleton.
