= St John's Church, Duxford =

Coordinates: 52.0944°N 0.1563°E

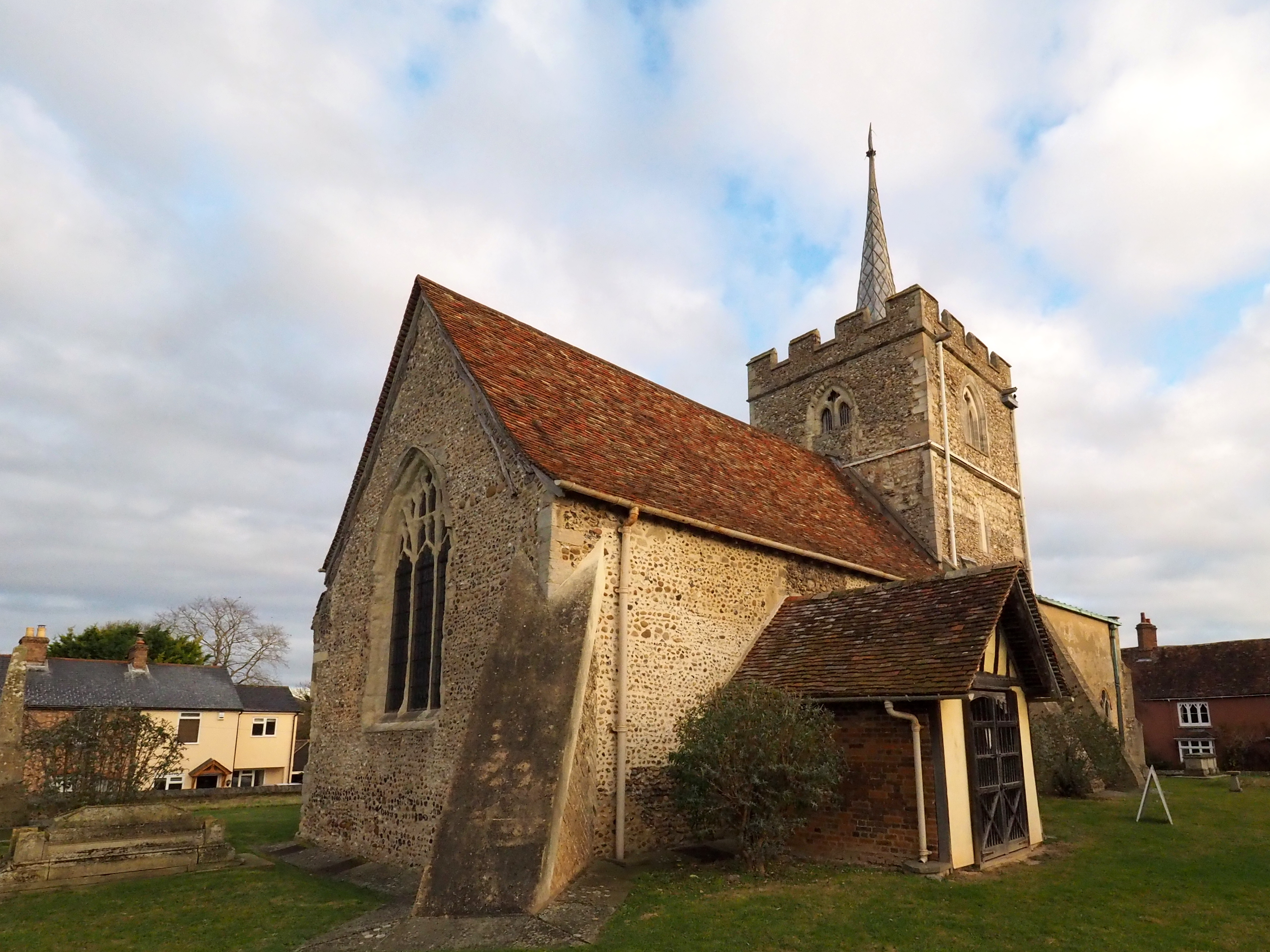
- St John's Church, Duxford, from the south-west, showing diagonal buttresses

- Location in Cambridgeshire
- OS grid reference: TL 478 462
- Location: Duxford, Cambridgeshire
- Country: England
- Denomination: Anglican

History
- Founded: c.1100

Architecture
- Functional status: Redundant
- Heritage designation: Grade I
- Designated: 22 November 1967
- Architectural type: Church
- Style: Norman, Gothic

Specifications
- Materials: Flint, pebbles and clunch Clunch and limestone dressings Roofs in tiles and copper

St John's Church, dedicated to St John the Baptist, is a redundant Anglican church in the village of Duxford, Cambridgeshire, England. In 1967 it was recorded in the National Heritage List for England as a designated Grade I listed building, and is now vested in The Churches Conservation Trust. The church stands on the junction of St John's Street and Green Street and is open daily, all year round to visitors.

== History ==
The tower, nave and chancel date from the late 12th century. During the following century the tower was raised and the chancel lengthened. A two-bay chapel was added to the north side of the chancel in about 1330. Later in the century windows were added to the lowest stage of the tower and to the west end of the nave. In the 15th century the north aisle and the porch were built, and the east window was added in the following century. In the 18th century repairs in brick were carried out. The north chapel was used as a schoolroom from the middle of the 17th century until about 1847. In 1874 the parish was united with the neighbouring parish of St Peter's Church, Duxford, and St John's became derelict. Plans to turn the church into an RAF memorial chapel were in place in the 1940s but never passed. In 1947 the bells of St John's were removed and five of them were transferred to St Peter's Church. The same year an application was made by the Rector of St Peter's to the Diocese of Ely to demolish the church as it had been "broken in to, defiled and misused in a great many and scandalous ways"; this was refused. An order of redundancy was granted on 19 May 1976, St John's being considered a chapel of ease in the parish of St Peter. The church was vested in the Churches Conservation Trust on 26 July 1979. The tower and the wall paintings were partially restored in 1985. Further restoration has stalled indefinitely.

== Architecture ==
=== Exterior ===
The church is constructed in flint, pebbles and clunch, with clunch and limestone dressings. Repairs have been carried out in brick. The flat roofs are covered in copper, the nave roof is tiled, and the spire is covered in lead. The plan consists of a nave with a north aisle, a central tower, and a chancel with a north chapel. Along the north aisle wall are buttresses and three three-light windows. The north chapel has a diagonal buttress to the east, two windows and gargoyles. In the middle stage of the tower are small round-headed windows, and the bell openings in the top stage have two lights. Its parapet is battlemented, and on top of the tower is a small lead-covered spirelet. The spirelet is twisted; this was caused when a flagpole was tied to it in 1897 to celebrate Queen Victoria's Diamond Jubilee, and it was damaged in a gale. The chancel east window has four lights. In the south wall of the chancel are a two-light window and a lancet window, and between them is a priest's door. The south wall of the tower is supported by two large buttresses, between which is a two-light window. The south wall of the nave contains a large three-light Perpendicular window. To the west of this is a timber-framed porch with a gable and plaster rendering including a small section of pargeting. This leads to the Norman doorway, which is decorated with chevrons, and its tympanum contains a rare stepped cross.

=== Interior ===
The Norman round-headed tower arches date from the 12th century. The west arch has three attached columns, and the east arch has a single column. At the base of the east arch is a pair of carved dogs. In the chapel are two ogee-headed niches and a cinquefoil-headed piscina. There is a niche with a round head on the east wall of the nave. The font dates from the 13th century, and has a plain octagonal bowl on a clunch pedestal. The communion rail, dating from the late 17th century, has barley-twist balusters. The benches date from the late 15th century, and the floor tiles from the 18th century. Inside the church is a variety of wall decorations, from medieval wall paintings to graffiti, some dating as late as the Second World War. From the medieval period are the images of two bishops in the north aisle, two further figures thought to represent Christ and the coronation of the Virgin Mary, and fragments of a possible Christ of the Trades which depicts working implements and would remind the congregation to keep the Sabbath holy, and that by using such working tools Christ would be wounded in turn. There is an Agnus Dei under the east tower arch flanked on either side by angels. On the west wall of the chancel are depictions of saints, including a female saint (possibly St Margaret) being tortured, as well as scenes from the Crucifixion and deposition of Christ. In the north chapel and arcade are graffiti from the time it was used as a school, some of which are in Latin. In the chancel is a long desk with copious graffiti, of particular note are two small coffins with skeletons visible inside. The most recent item in the nave is a depiction of Christ drawn by a look-out soldier during World War II.

== External features ==
In the churchyard are two chest tombs, one bearing dates in the 19th century, the other without an inscription, which are designated as Grade II listed buildings. The churchyard has been cleared of its headstones which now line the westernmost wall. Many had fallen or were in danger of doing so, and the yard is now in the care of Duxford Parish Council who found it easier to maintain. There is a "no mow' policy in place for most of the year in certain parts of the churchyard excepting access up to and around the church. There is an abundance of snowdrops in early spring, cowslips in late spring and ox-eye daisies, grasses and orchids in the summer.

== Recent years ==
Volunteers put on summer events at St John's including classical concerts, book launches, poetry readings and masterclasses. Since 2018, This Is My Theatre has performed live drama inside and outside, to great acclaim. For several years the church hosted an annual Advent Market. The final one took place in 2022. St John's remains consecrated and has been used many times in recent years for key parish services. Private tours are available on request, and the church has an annual visit by the village primary school, as well as the local scout group. A series of four local films were made in Duxford in 2023, one of which was called "Thoughts and Prayers", now available on YouTube.

== Gallery ==
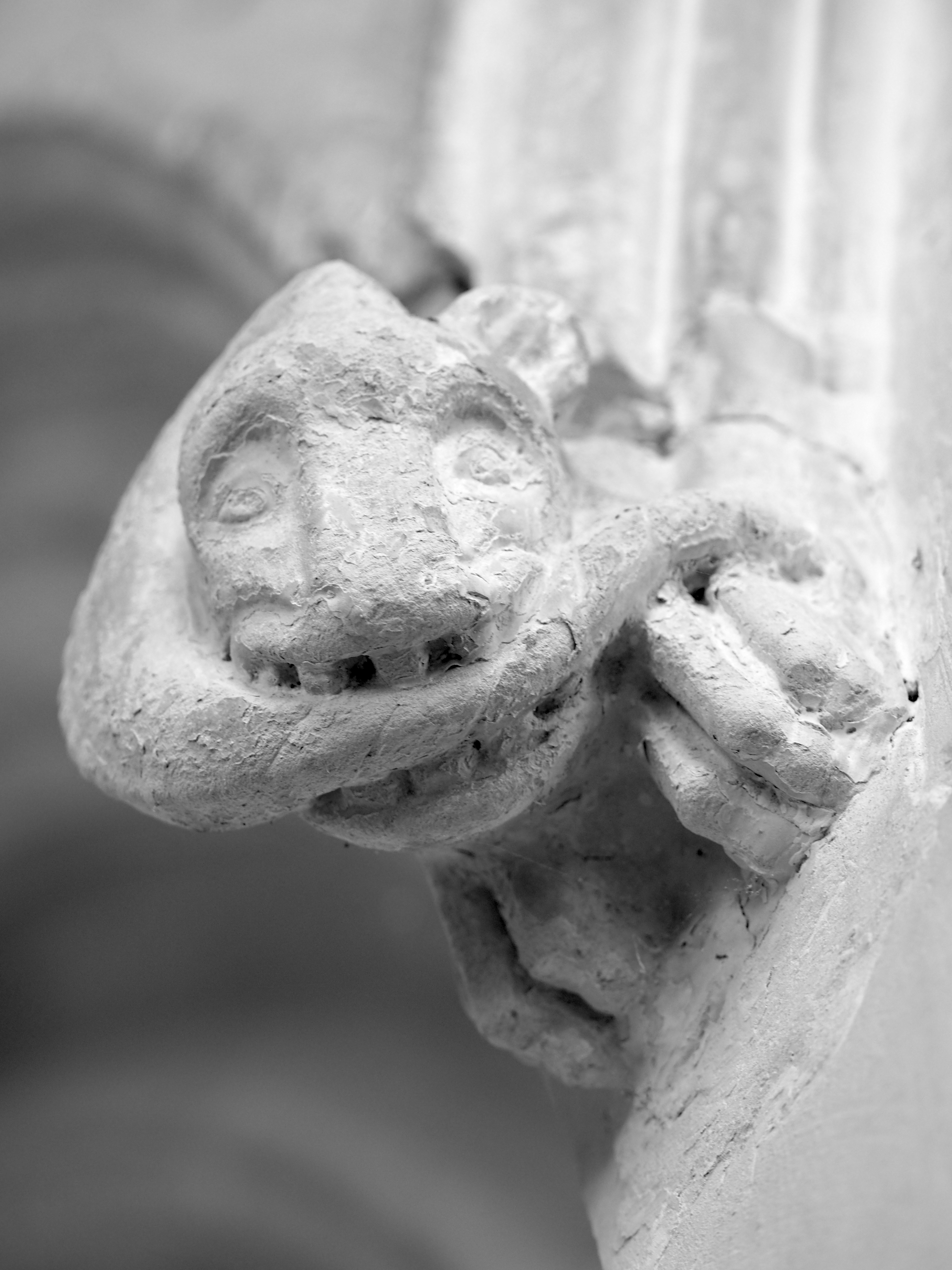
Tail-biting beast on the north side of chancel

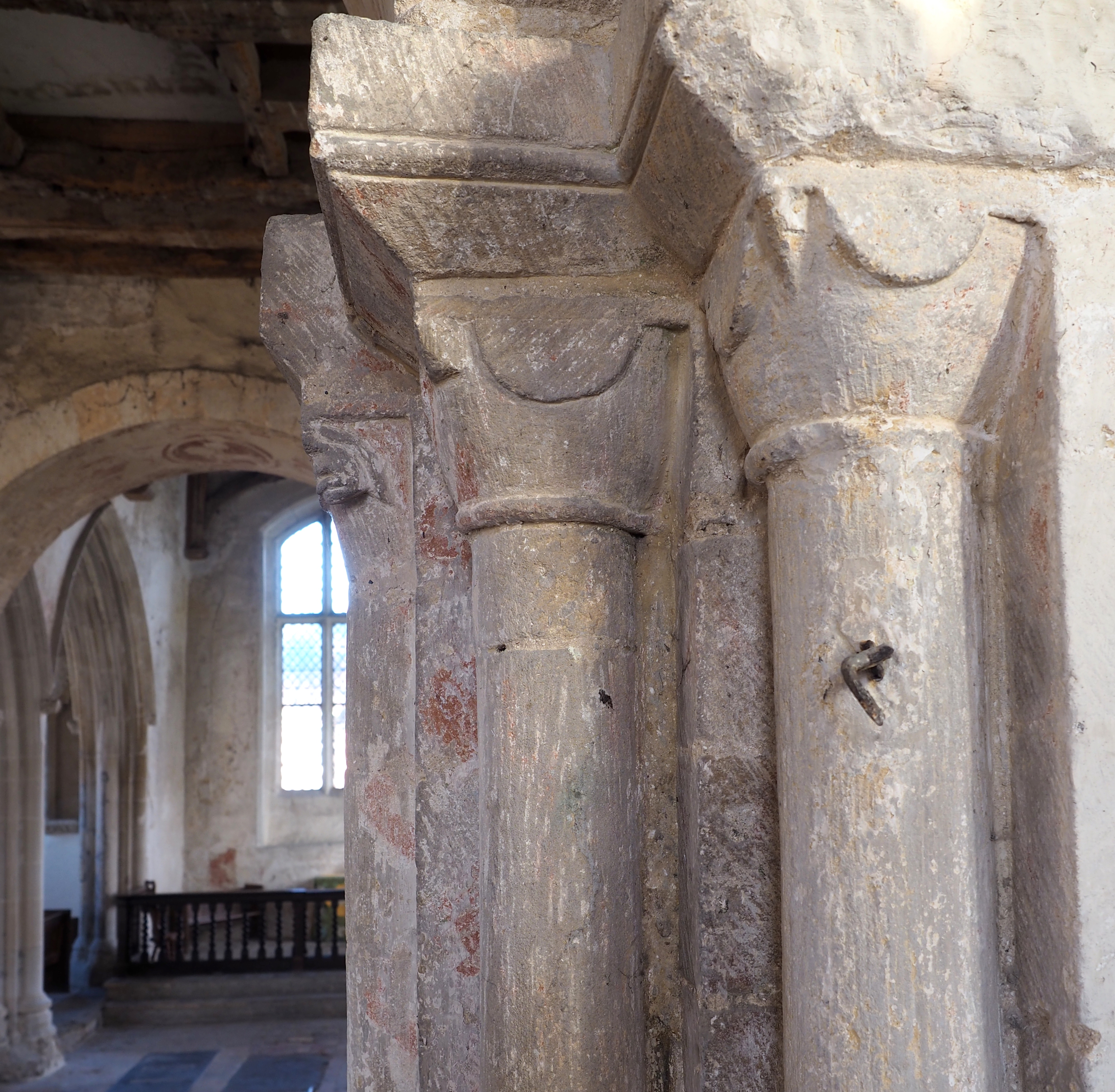
Triple shafts of the Norman arch showing faint original decoration

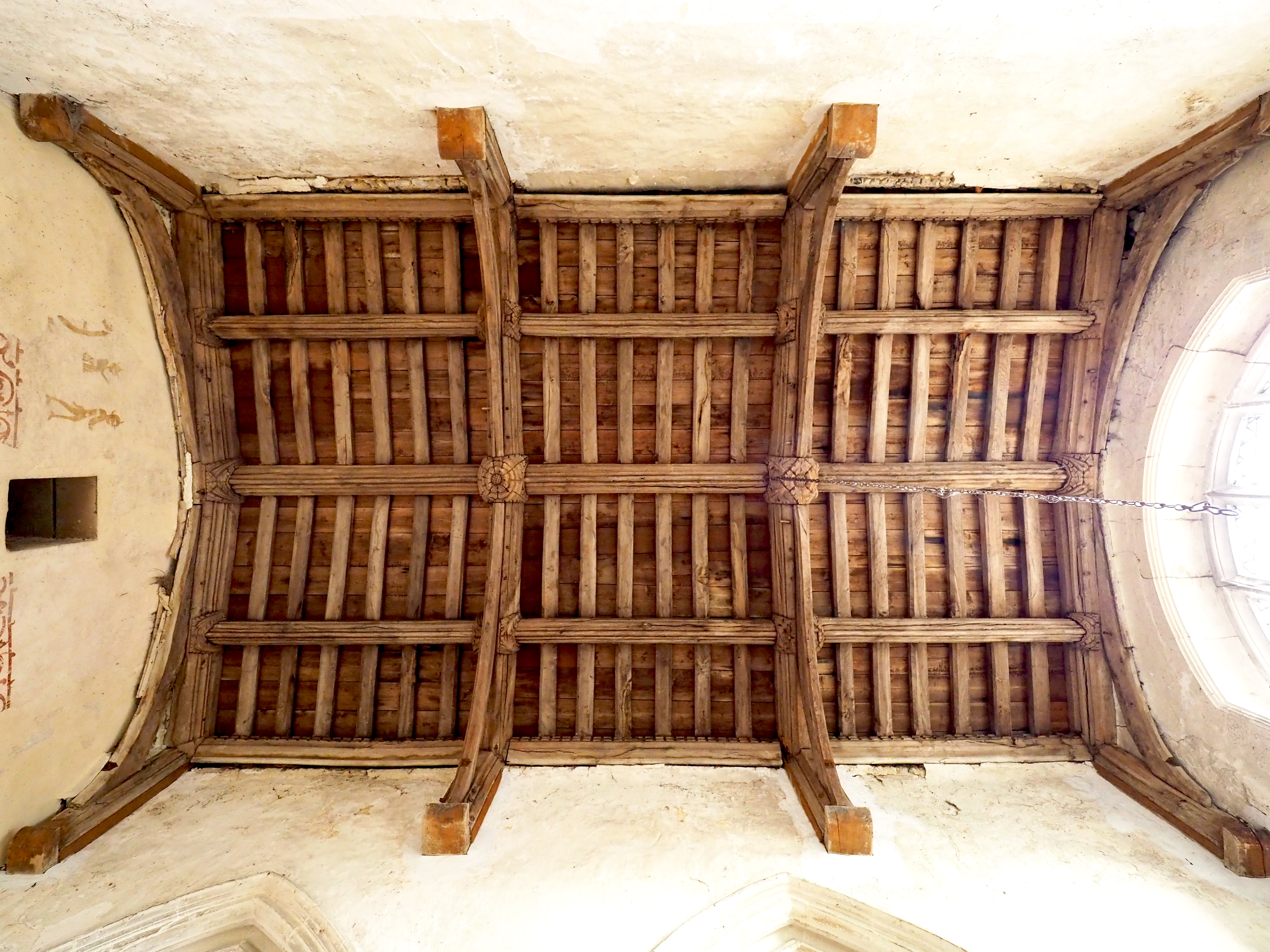
Chancel roof

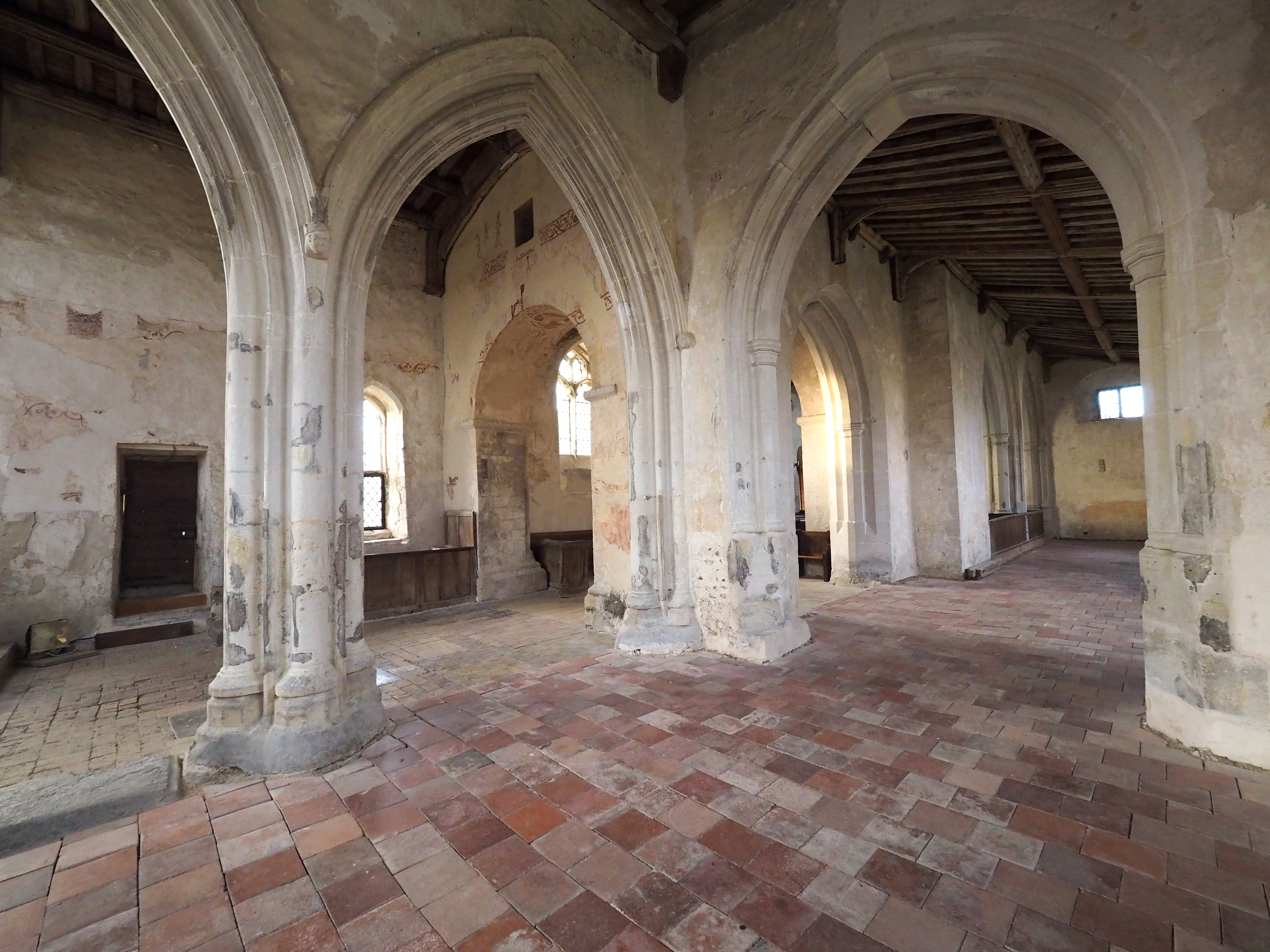
Chancel & north aisle from NE corner

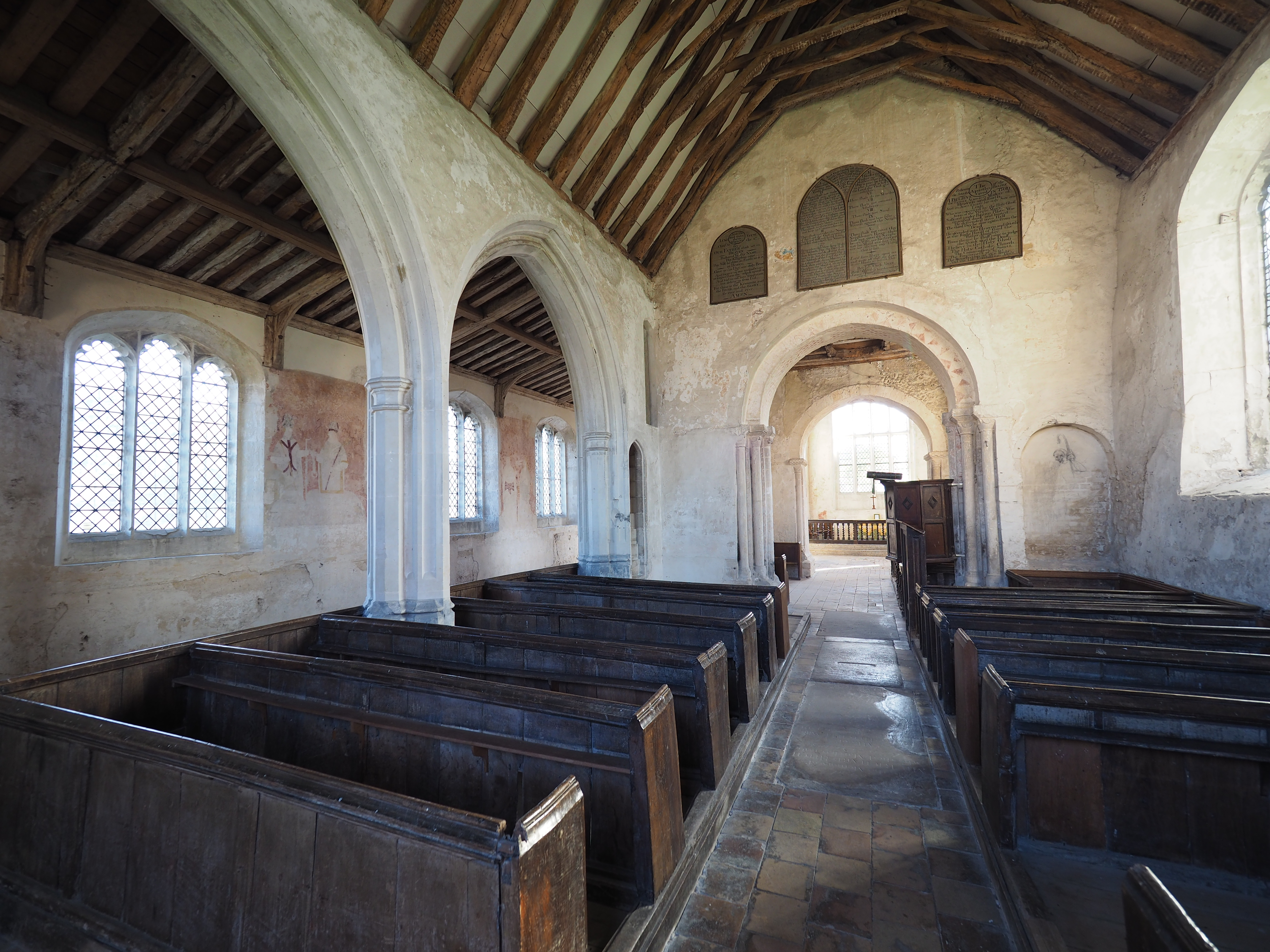
Nave with 15th-century pews, Ten Commandments board, Lord's Prayer & Apostles' Creed

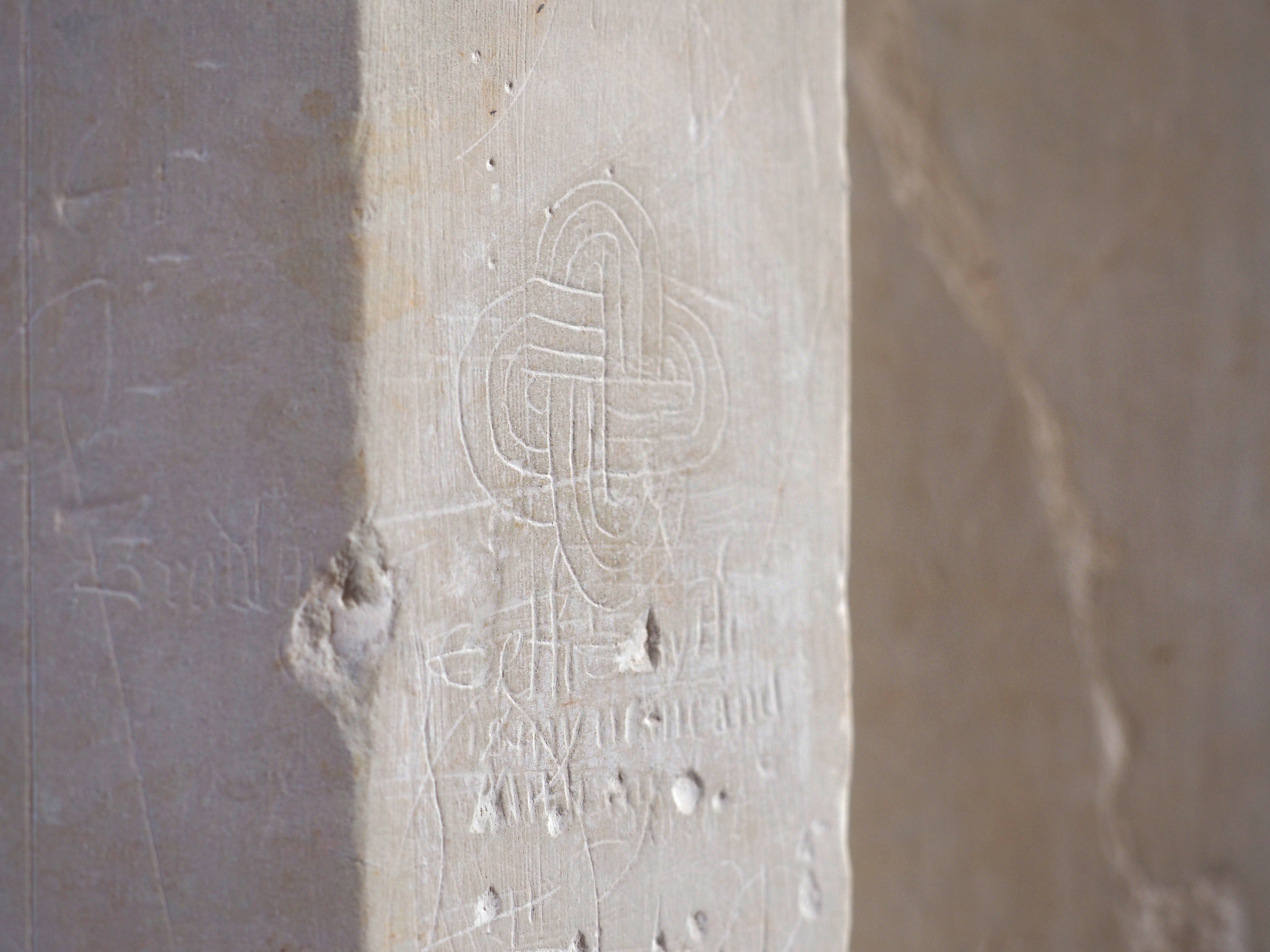
"Solomon's knot" graffiti near tower crossing

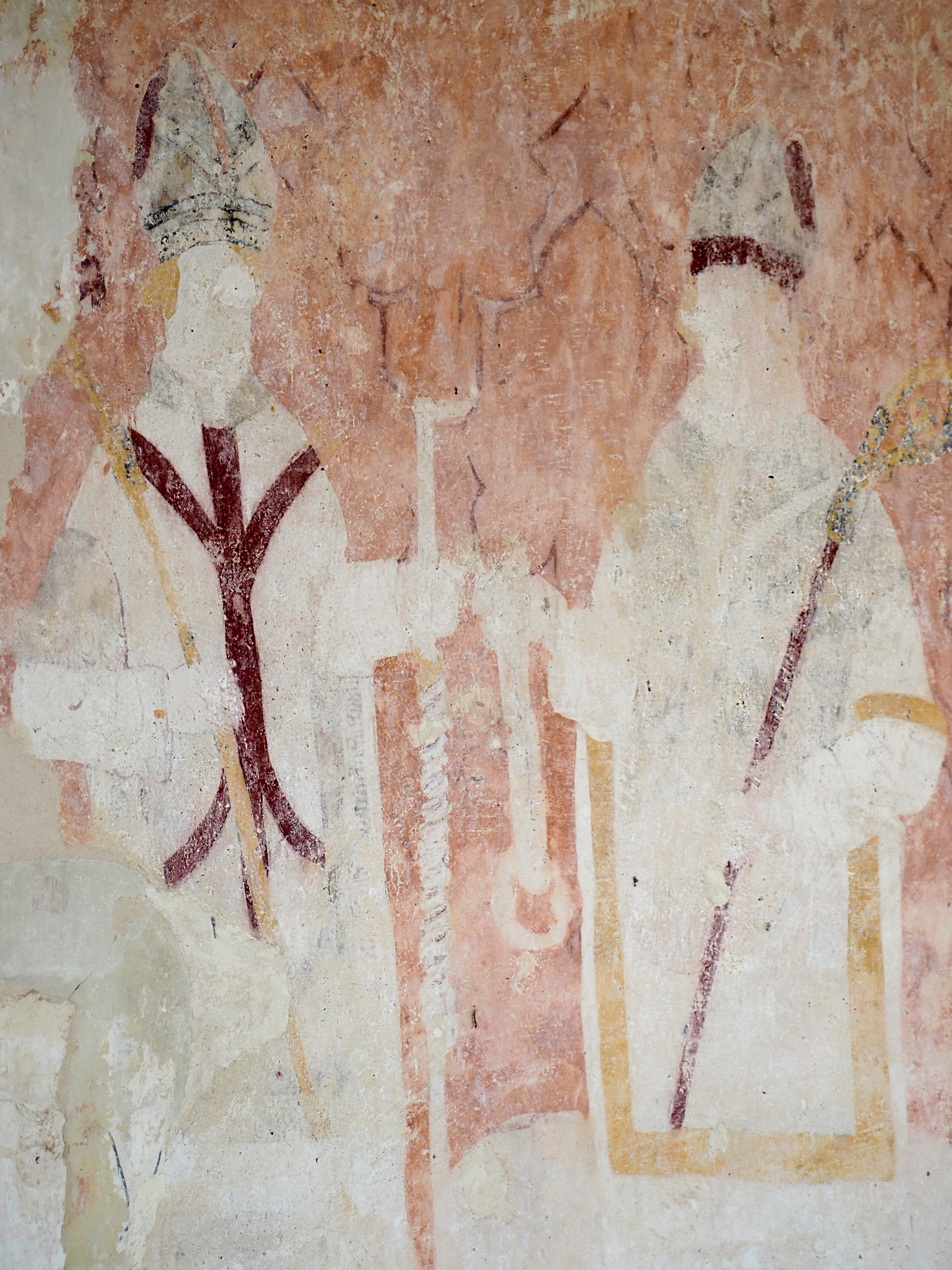
15th-century wall paintings, possibly St Erasmus (Elmo) and St Leonard

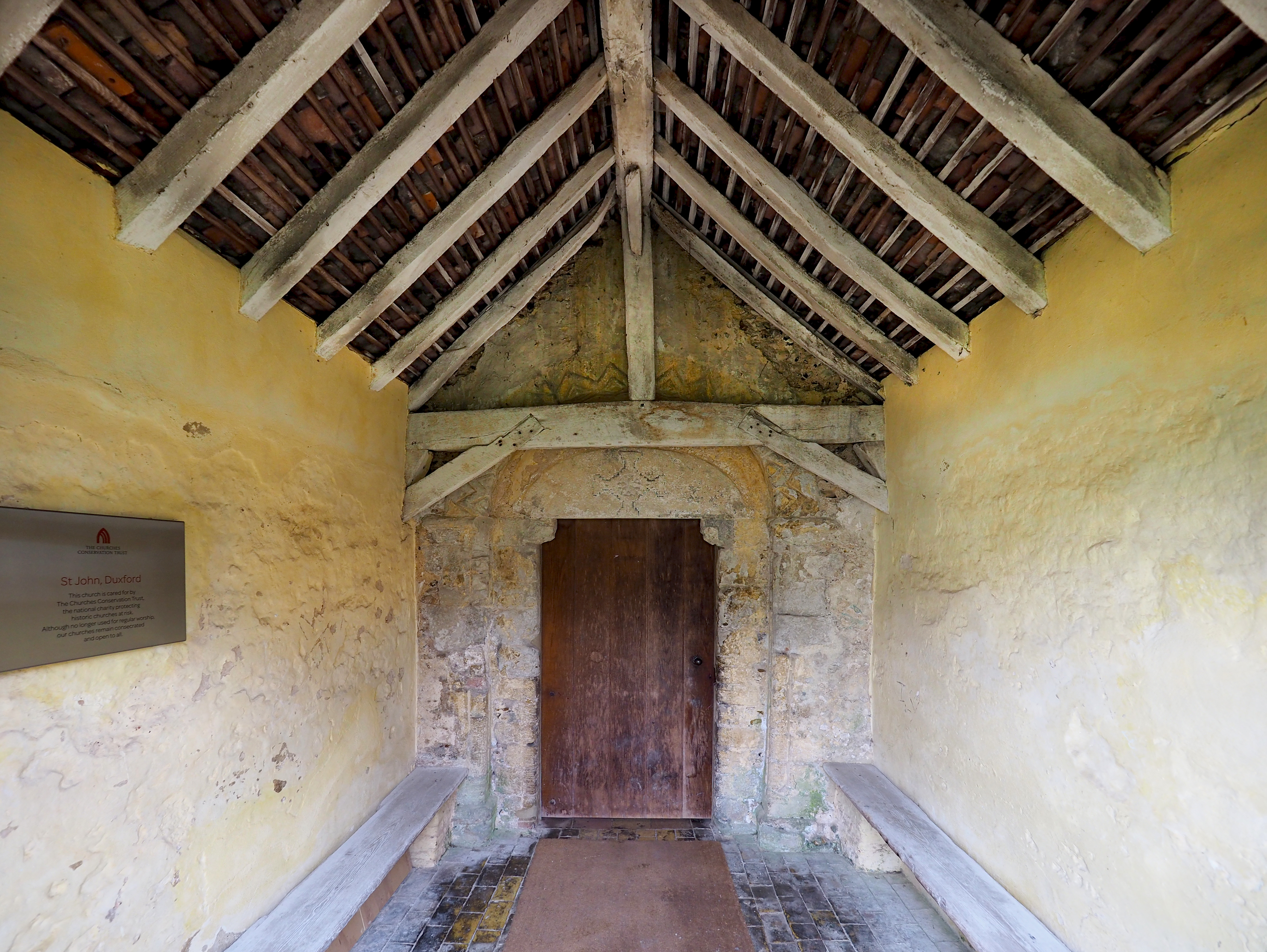
15th-century porch & south door with rare 'stepped' cross
