= Ickleton Priory =

Priory in Ickleton, Cambridgeshire, England

- Location within Cambridgeshire
- Interactive map of Ickleton Priory

Monastery information
- Order: Benedictine
- Established: 12th century
- Disestablished: 1536
- Dedication: St Mary Magdalene
- Diocese: Ely
- Controlled churches: Arrington, Ickleton

Architecture
- Functional status: defunct
- Heritage designation: Grades II & II*
- Designated date: 1966, 1967

Site
- Location: Ickleton, Cambridgeshire
- Coordinates: 52°4′15″N 0°10′15″E
- Grid reference: TL48904362
- Visible remains: Core of Abbey Farmhouse; 13th or 14th century barn
- Public access: no
- Other information: nunnery

Ickleton Priory was a Benedictine priory of nuns at Ickleton, Cambridgeshire, England. It was established in the middle of the 12th century and suppressed in the Dissolution of the Monasteries in 1536.

The priory's dedicatee was Saint Mary Magdalene.

== History ==
The earliest record of Ickleton Priory's existence is a commission issued between 1174 and 1181 by Pope Alexander III. This was in response to the priory's claim that in about 1163 Thomas Becket, then Archbishop of Canterbury, had granted the nuns in income of 40 shillings from the parish church of nearby Fowlmere.

In 1151, the manor of Ickleton was given to the Aubrey de Vere, 1st Earl of Oxford as a wedding gift by King Stephen and Queen Maud for his marriage to Euphemia.

The priory dominated Ickleton for three and a half centuries and held the parish's principal manor, which by 1536 covered 714 acres (289 ha). However, the priory's total estates were not extensive and the priory was neither large nor wealthy. By 1279 the priory had the small manor of Netherhall in Arrington, which it held of Lady Clare. In 1393 the priory acquired a messuage at nearby Duxford under licence.

The priory held more land in Essex than Cambridgeshire. This included a manor, later called Impey Hall, at Buttsbury and Stock Harward. The priory's other Cambridgeshire lands were in the parishes of Ashdon, Elmington, Great Chesterford, Greshall, Littlebury and Strethall.

Parish churches were another source of monastic income. However, in 1378 the priory held only two parish churches: those at Ickleton and Arrington. By the 1450s the priory had been granted an income from the church at Shingay, although the church itself was held by the Knights Hospitaller's Shingay Preceptory.

By 1227 the prioress had the right to hold at Ickleton a weekly market, an annual fair and a court leet. From 1236 she was chartered to hold a market at Stock Harward.

Because it was not wealthy, the priory was exempted from tax in 1256 and many subsequent occasions, including in 1402. About 1290 the priory was valued at £15 6s 7 1/2d. In 1379, when the priory was surveyed for the poll tax, it was categorised among priories with an annual income between 40 and 100 marks (between £26 13s 4d and £66 13s 4d).

The poll tax survey of 1379 recorded the priory as having nine nuns. Records of the elections of prioresses state that there were 11 nuns in 1444 and nine in 1490.

The priory was twice attacked during civil unrest. The first was in about 1266, after the Battle of Evesham in the Second Barons' War. The second was on 16 June 1381 in the Peasants' Revolt, when rebels attacked the priory and burnt the prioress's court rolls and documents. Because of this, records such as the elections of earlier prioresses are missing, and there is no complete record of their names or the number of nuns in the first two centuries of the priory's history.

== Suppression ==
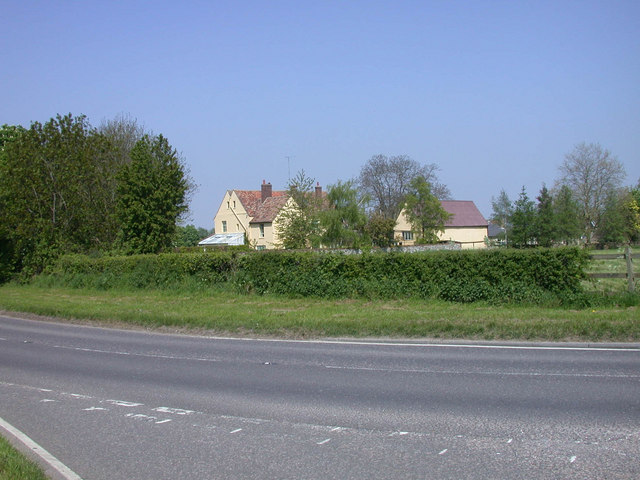
Abbey Farm, said to be on the site of Ickleton Priory

The Suppression of Religious Houses Act 1535 was passed to dissolve England's lesser religious houses, the first phase of the Dissolution of the Monasteries. Under the Act a Valor Ecclesiasticus was made, which valued Ickleton Priory at £71 9s 10 1/2d.

In 1536 the priory was suppressed and surrendered its assets to the Crown. The last prioress, Joan Ashwell, was granted a pension of £8.

The Crown promised the priory to Henry VIII's physician, Thomas Wendy. However, there was an administrative delay and Dr Wendy was given the demesnes of Royston Priory instead. In 1537 Ickleton Priory was granted to a John Slether, but in 1538 Thomas Goodrich, Bishop of Ely gave the Crown his see's manor at Hatfield, Hertfordshire in exchange for Swaffham Priory and Ickleton Priory.

== Remains ==
The Victoria County History states that Abbey Farm, east of Duxford Road, is on the site of the priory. Abbey Farmhouse is a medieval building with a 13th-century core. Its farm buildings include a late 13th or early 14th century barn, altered in the 15th century, which has eight bays with a queen-post roof. The barn is now a Grade II* listed building.

However, Nikolaus Pevsner and English Heritage state that Priory Farmhouse, a timber-framed 16th-century farmhouse in Abbey Street, some distance southeast of Abbey Farm, stands on what is claimed to be the site of the priory.

== Annual Fair ==
Ickleton market and fair were chartered under Henry III between 1222 and 1227, possibly in confirmation of an earlier charter that the priory claimed was granted by King Stephen (reigned 1135–41). The market was every Thursday and the annual fair was on Mary Magdalene's feast day, 22 July.

The annual fair survived the priory's suppression. In the latter part of the 16th century it was still being held in the former priory's barnyard, still took place around the feast day of St Mary Magdalene, and ran for five days. In the 18th and early 19th century it was a one-day event on the feast day itself, trading mainly in horses and cheese. In 1872 the fair was owned by the farmer of Abbey Farm when the Home Secretary, Henry Bruce, abolished Ickleton Fair under the Fairs Act 1871.

== Sources ==
- Pevsner, Nikolaus (1970) [1954]. Cambridgeshire. The Buildings of England. Harmondsworth: Penguin Books. p. 412. ISBN 0-14-071010-8.
- Salzman, L.F., ed. (1948). "The Priory of Ickleton". A History of the County of Cambridge and the Isle of Ely: Volume 2. Victoria County History. pp. 223–226.
- Wright, A.P.M.; Rosen, Adrienne B.; Keeling, Susan M.; Meekings, C.A.F. (1978). "Ickleton". A History of the County of Cambridge and the Isle of Ely: Volume 6. Victoria County History. pp. 230–246.
