= Team Consulting =

UK medical device company

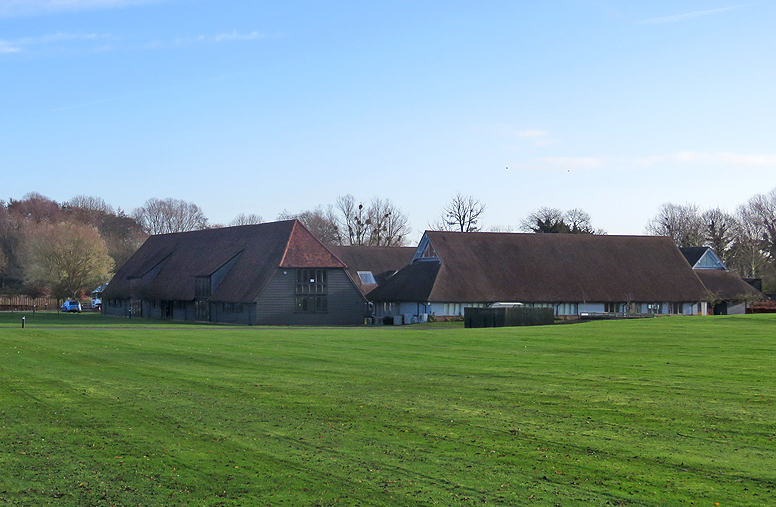
- Company headquarters in Ickleton, UK
- Type: Employee-owned
- Industry: Medical device design and development, consulting
- Founded: 1986
- Headquarters: Ickleton, Cambridge, UK
- Area served: Worldwide
- Key people: Iain Ansell (CEO); Andy Fry (Founder); Tim Irish (Chairman)
- Number of employees: 140 (October 2022)
- Website: www.team-consulting.com

Team Consulting is a medical device design and development consultancy. The company works with pharmaceutical companies and Medtech businesses globally.

The company is located on the outskirts of Cambridge, UK, and is part of Silicon Fen, the cluster of high-tech businesses in Cambridge. The majority of the company's workforce are consultants.

== History ==
Team Consulting was founded in 1986 and began as a general product development and engineering consultancy before focusing on the medical sector in the early 1990s. In 2004, the company moved into its current premises in Ickleton, Cambridge.

In 2014, Team completed a staff-led buyout. The buyout involved more than 80% of staff buying equity in the company to ensure ownership remained with the staff.

In December 2016, the company worked with Graeme Nuttall OBE at Fieldfisher LLP to transfer control of the company to an Employee Ownership Trust (EOT). In June 2017, the company announced the recruitment of its 100th employee.

== Work and awards ==
Team Consulting's work primarily focuses on the design and development of medical devices in areas such as drug delivery (respiratory, parenteral, ocular, nasal), critical care, surgery, diagnostics, Medtech and digital health. The organization has filed many patents with clients.

Team Consulting have won various design and engineering awards for their work. In 2012, Team Consulting worked with OrganOx, a spin-out company from the University of Oxford to develop a world-first device which keeps a human liver alive outside the body. This work received the 'Consultancy of the Year' award at the British Engineering Excellence Awards and three Institution of Engineering and Technology awards.

== Culture ==
In the 2013 Cambridgeshire Cycle Challenge, Team Consulting came in both 2nd and 3rd place for companies between 50 and 199 employees for encouraging the most people to cycle to work.

Two years later, Team Consulting took part in the 2015 'Love to Ride' National Cycle Challenge, again achieving 2nd place for companies between 50 and 199 employees. The company managed an 86% staff participation rate and cycled over 3,500 miles during the three-week challenge.
