= St Peter's Church, Duxford =

Church in Duxford, England

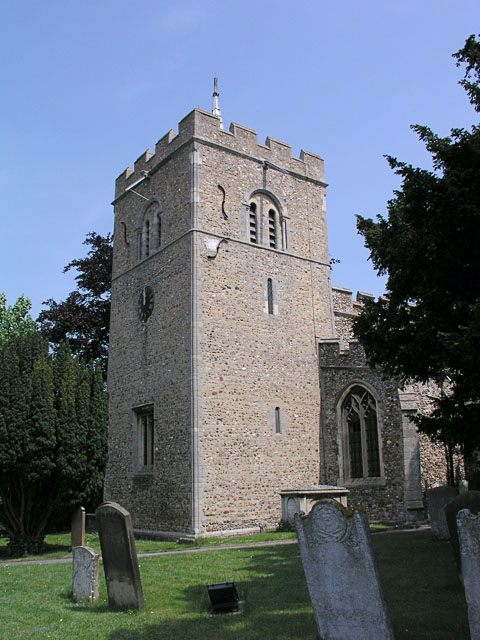
St Peter's Church

St Peter's is an Anglican church in the village of Duxford, Cambridgeshire. From the early 12th century until the mid-19th century it was one of two active parish churches in the village (the other being St John's about 500m away), but their merger in 1874 saw St Peter's chosen as the sole parish church for the village. To that end, the incumbent is known as the Rector of St Peter's with St John's, Duxford. It has been Grade I listed since 1967.

St Peter's is located in the south of the village's conservation area, just west of the River Cam. It has been dedicated to St Peter since at least 1275. It consists of a chancel, north and south aisles, a clerestoried nave, and a west tower. The tower and part of the chancel remain from the earliest times but the nave was rebuilt in the 14th or 15th century. In 1728 the tower had the existing tall spire removed and replaced with the present shorter one commonly seen in churches of this region. By the time the parishes were merged, the building was in a poor state, and was extensively restored by Ewan Christian between 1884-91. There are east and west stained glass windows by F.C. Eden (1932) and three south-facing windows by James Powell & Sons (Whitefriars) (1888-1904) depicting Christ the Good Shepherd, St John the Evangelist, St Peter and St Peter being led from bondage by an angel.

The church tower houses six bells, nearly all of which were transferred from the then chapel of ease St John's in 1947 and installed in 1948. They are rung regularly on Monday evenings, and for special occasions. The clock face was restored in 2018 in time for the service of remembrance to mark the centenary of the end of the First World War. After the major theft of lead from both aisles and the porch in 2018, a fundraising campaign was started for its replacement. This work was completed in January 2024, and a further campaign is currently ongoing to raise money for the nave roof.

St Peter's hosts a free drop-in group for babies, toddlers and their adults twice a month, known as 'Tiddlers', as well as occasional craft cafes and fundraising events throughout the year. It has kitchen and toilet facilities and the entrance and nave areas are accessible to wheelchair users. The church is open daily for anyone wishing to visit and for private prayer. The porch and exterior noticeboard contain information on all services and events.

Its parish is part of the Hinkledux group of churches along with St Mary Magdalene Church, Ickleton and SS Mary and John, Hinxton in the Diocese of Ely.
