= Ickleton =

Village in Cambridgeshire, England

Coordinates: 52.072°N 0.177°E

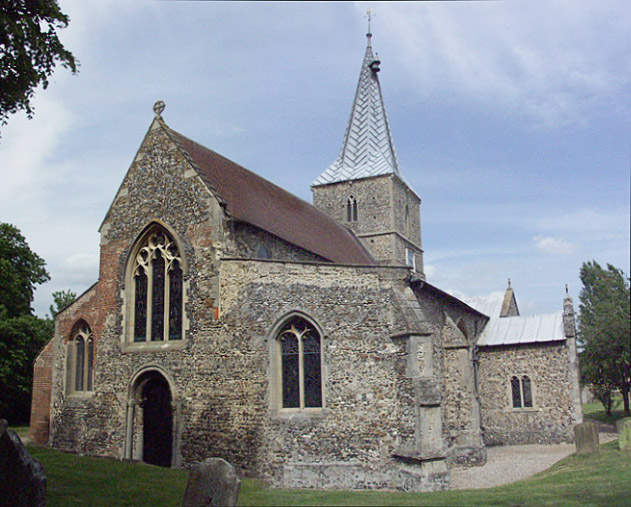
- St Mary Magdalene parish church

- Location within Cambridgeshire
- Population: 709 (2011 Census)
- OS grid reference: TL4943
- District: South Cambridgeshire
- Shire county: Cambridgeshire
- Region: East
- Country: England
- Sovereign state: United Kingdom
- Post town: Saffron Walden
- Postcode district: CB10
- Dialling code: 01799
- Police: Cambridgeshire
- Fire: Cambridgeshire
- Ambulance: East of England
- Website: Ickleton Cambridgeshire

Ickleton is a village and civil parish about 9 miles (14 km) south of Cambridge in Cambridgeshire, England. The village is beside the River Cam, close to where a southern branch of the Icknield Way crossed the river. The eastern and southern boundaries of the parish form part of the county boundary with Essex, and the Essex town of Saffron Walden is only about 4.5 miles (7 km) southeast of the village.

The village is mainly grouped around three streets: Abbey Street, Frogge Street, and Church Street, which leads into Brookhampton Street. The village is at the eastern end of its parish, which extends 2 miles (3 km) to the west.

== Archaeology ==
A Neolithic axe-head has been found in the parish, suggesting a human presence before 2500 BC.

About 1.5 miles (2.4 km) southwest of the village near Valance Farm is a late Bronze Age bowl barrow, close to the supposed route of the pre-Roman Icknield Way. The barrow and its surrounding ditch are well-preserved, about 80 feet (24 m) in diameter and 3 to 4 feet (0.9 to 1.2 m) high. Other Bronze Age remains found in the parish include a spear-head, a gold bracelet and a torc. South of the village on the side of Coploe Hill is a series of earth banks that may also be Bronze Age. They start about 1,200 yards (1,100 m) south of the village and extend 0.5 miles (800 m) south, as far as the Essex county boundary.

About 700 yards (640 m) south of the parish church, just west of Frogge Street, is the site of a Roman villa. The site is just across the River Cam from the site of a Roman fort at Great Chesterford. The villa was of modest size, and it had an outhouse or barn. The site was excavated in 1842.

About 0.5 miles (800 m) north of the village, just over the boundary in Duxford parish, is the site of a Romano-British settlement.

== Manors ==
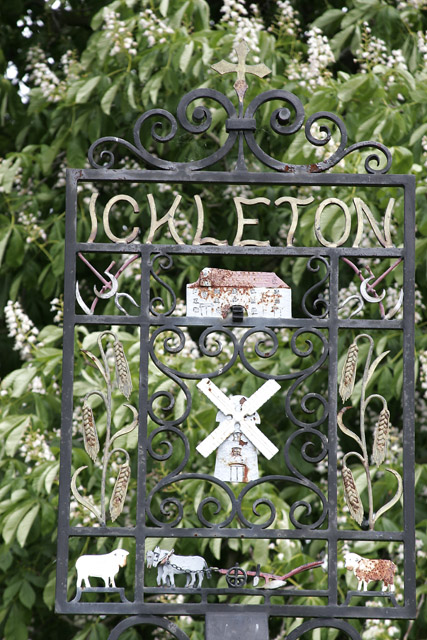
Wrought iron village sign

There are records of continuous Anglo-Saxon settlement at Ickleton for at least 1,000 years. Its toponym is derived from Old English, meaning "Icel's farm" or "estate associated with a man named Icel".

In the late 10th or early 11th century Elfhelm of Wratting, a thegn of King Edgar the Peaceful, left one hide of land at Icelingtune to his kinsman, also called Elfhelm. In the reign of Edward the Confessor in the middle of the 11th century, 20 hides of land were being farmed in the parish. Squitrebil held 19 1/2 of them from the King, and Estred held the other 1/2 hide from Ælfgar, Earl of Mercia.

After the Norman Conquest of England in 1066, almost all English estates were taken from their owners and granted to Norman barons. In 1067 William the Conqueror granted the manor of Hichelintone to Eustace II, Count of Boulogne, making Ickleton part of the Honour of Boulogne. The Domesday Book of 1086 records 43 tenants in the parish,

In 1125 Stephen of Blois and Eustace II's granddaughter, Matilda of Boulogne, were married, making Stephen Count of Boulogne jure uxoris. In 1135 Stephen became King of England and in 1141 he granted Ickleton to Geoffrey de Mandeville, 1st Earl of Essex. However, Mandeville became an outlaw in 1143 and was killed in 1144, and Ickleton seems to have reverted to the Crown.

In about 1150 Stephen and Maud granted Ickleton to Eupheme, second wife of Aubrey de Vere, 1st Earl of Oxford, as a wedding present. In about 1153 Eupheme granted £5 worth of land at Ickleton to Colne Priory. By the end of that year Eupheme had died and the rest of Ickleton seems to have reverted to the Honour of Boulogne. When William I, Count of Boulogne died in 1159, King Henry II took possession of the Honour.

Variations in spelling the village name may include 'Igyllyngton', as seen in 1460.

=== Lesser estates ===
There was a number of smaller manors in the parish.

==== Valence or Vallance ====
By 1162 the hospital at Montmorillon in Poitou, France held an estate at Ickleton. The steward of William I, Count of Boulogne had granted the land, and the Hundred Rolls of 1279 recorded that it covered about 100 acres (40 ha) and was tenanted by one Thomas the deacon. In 1300 Montmorillon hospital conveyed the estate to Aymer de Valence, 2nd Earl of Pembroke. In 1305 Thomas relinquished his tenancy, and the Earl granted the estate to a Sir John Wollaston for the rest of the latter's life. When the Earl died in 1324 he left the estate to his granddaughter Elizabeth de Comyn, but it continued to be called the Valence manor. Elizabeth and her husband Richard Talbot, 2nd Baron Talbot sold the manor in 1332 and it changed hands again in 1333, 1334 and 1344. In 1344 Valence manor was bought jointly by John Illegh, who was rector of Icklingham, Suffolk and Thomas Keningham, a fellow of Michaelhouse, Cambridge. In 1345 Illegh made over his share of the estate to Michaelhouse.

In 1546 during the Reformation Michaelhouse was dissolved by the Dissolution of Colleges Act 1545 (37 Hen. 8. c. 4), along with King's Hall, Cambridge, and the two were merged to form Trinity College, Cambridge. The Valence manor was granted to the new college, and in 1612 it was expanded to 307 acres (124 ha). When Ickleton parish was inclosed in 1814 Trinity College was allotted 243 acres (98 ha), which was named Vallance Farm. It increased this to 340 acres (140 ha) by 1946, when Vallance Farm was sold.

There was a Valence manor house by 1324, and there are subsequent records of it in 1461 and 1508. It may have been the same as the Valence manor house recorded in 1612, 1685 and 1726 on the south side of Mill Lane. It was a substantial house with six rooms on the ground floor and two solars upstairs. The present Vallance farm in Grange Road has a brick farmhouse built in about 1825 for Trinity College's tenant.

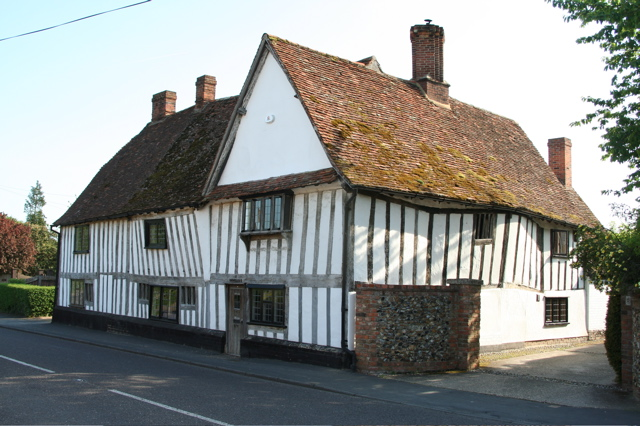
The Hovells, a 16th-century former manor house that was the seat of one of Ickleton's lesser estates

==== Hovells ====
By 1183 Ralph Brito held land at Ickleton of the Honour of Boulogne. By 1221 it had passed by marriage to Robert Hovel, whose bride was the daughter of Ralph's heir Thomas Brito. In 1222 a William Brito released a carucate of land to Hovel. The small estate passed to a Ralph Hovel and came to be called Hovells Manor. In 1253 Ralph Hovel confirmed a grant of 140 acres (57 ha) of land, apparently Hovells Manor at Ickleton, to the Cistercian Tilty Abbey in Essex. Certainly Tilty Abbey held Hovells Manor by 1279, when the Hundred Rolls recorded that it covered 190 acres (77 ha). Under the feudal system Tilty Abbey held the estate of Robert Hovel, who in turn held it of the Honour of Boulogne.

The present Hovells house in Frogge Street was the manor house. It is an early 16th-century timber-framed building, altered and extended in the 17th century.

==== Durham's ====
By 1199 Hamon Walter, a younger brother of Theobald Walter, 1st Baron Butler and the Archbishop of Canterbury Hubert Walter had granted a small estate at Ickleton called Durhams Manor to the Premonstratensian West Dereham Abbey in Norfolk. In about 1235 it was assessed at one hide. The Hundred Rolls record that in 1279 the Abbey held in Ickleton about 52 acres (21 ha) "of Robert the son of Ryenold the knight" and possibly 68 acres (28 ha) of Ickleton Priory. The present Durham's Farmhouse in Butcher's Hill is a late 16th-century timber-framed building with 17th-century or later additions.

==== Caldress or Caldrees ====
Before 1213 the Cistercian Calder Abbey in Cumberland had received land and half a watermill at Ickleton from Richard de Luci. The estate came to be called Caldress Manor after the Abbey, which in 1279 held it of Thomas de Multon. This would seem to be the Thomas de Multon who was a descendant of Thomas de Multon, Lord de Luci, father of Thomas de Multon, 1st Baron Multon of Gilsland and died in 1287.

The present Caldress Manor house in Abbey Street may have 16th- or 17th-century origins. It was added to in about 1800. Later in the 19th century the house was altered again for Robert Herbert, first Premier of Queensland, Australia, who was born in Ickleton. The original part of the house is timber-framed and the additions are brick.

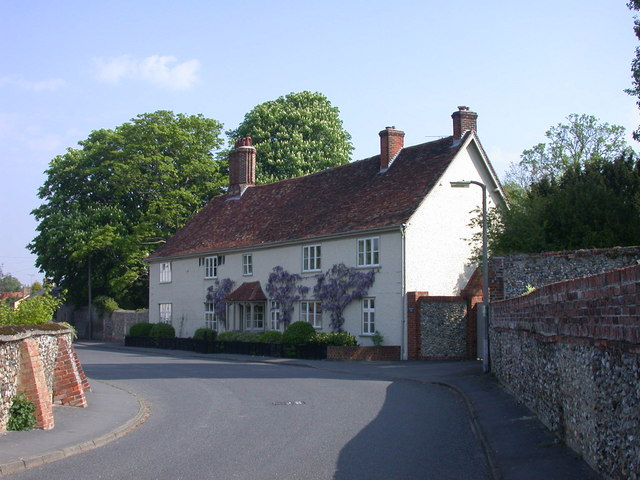
Norman Hall, a 15th-century house with 16th-century and later alterations, became the seat of Brays manor until 1867

==== Brays ====
In 1279 John le Bray held land at Ickleton, and in 1302 the same or a later John le Bray held land at Ickleton of the Honour of Boulogne. By 1346 the holding had passed to a John Sawston but it was still called Brays manor. It then passed through different owners and the record of succession is incomplete until 1523. In 1604 a member of the Crudd family (see Mowbrays, below) bought much of the land, and by 1704 Brays and Mowbrays manors were owned by the same Thomas Crudd. He died unmarried in 1714, leaving both manors to the Hanchett family, into which two of his sisters had married. In the inclosure of 1814 Samuel Hanchett was allotted 106 acres (43 ha). Brays stayed in the Hanchett family until it was sold in 1867. Robert Herbert (see Caldress or Caldrees, above) bought part of the land but sold much of it in 1873.

There was a messuage with Brays manor in 1279, but by 1545 the house on the site had gone. By 1730 the house for the manor was Little Farm, east of the churchyard. This was later combined with the house next door to form Norman Hall, which in 1867 was sold and ceased to be a farmhouse. The oldest part of Norman Hall is not Norman at all but a 15th-century timber-framed medieval hall with a cross-wing. It was altered in the 16th century and added to in the 18th and 19th centuries. The exterior is finished with a combination of flint, brick and 18th-century pargetting.

==== Limburys ====
By 1279 Roger de Neville held about 60 acres (24 ha) of demesne under Thomas de Multon. In 1302 Philip de Neville held 1/4 of a knight's fee at Ickleton, which by 1316 had passed to Sir John Limbury. In 1335 Sir John was Sheriff of Cambridgeshire and held 100 acres (40 ha) at Ickleton of the de Multons. The estate passed to Sir John's heirs and descendants and came to be called Limburys manor. In 1433 Elizabeth, Lady Swinburne (née Limbury) died and in 1456 her executor sold the manor with about 80 acres (32 ha) to Clare Hall, Cambridge.

Limbury manor had a messuage by 1279 and two in 1388 and 1389. In 1545 the farmstead was in Frog Street. In 1704 the farm-buildings were still there but there was no house. After Clare Hall bought Mowbrays manor in 1819 it let Limburys and Mowbrays together and the tenants lived at Mowbrays (see below). The present house called Limburys is a flint rubblestone house in Abbey Street dating probably from the early to mid 19th century.

==== Mowbrays ====
In 1279 the heirs of a William de Beauchamp of Bedford held 30 acres (12 ha) at Ickleton of West Dereham Abbey (see above). This descended by a female heir to the Mowbray family, and when John de Mowbray, 4th Baron Mowbray died in 1368 is estate included 30 acres at Ickleton held of the Honour of Boulogne. He left the estate to his son Thomas, who in 1397 was created 1st Duke of Norfolk. The manor stayed in the Mowbray family until John de Mowbray, 4th Duke of Norfolk and his wife Elizabeth conveyed it to feoffees in 1469.

The estate continued to be called Mowbrays manor, and in the 1540s it was among lands bought by an Ickleton yeoman, John Crudd, who enlarged the estate. Mowbrays descended in the Crudd family and its heirs the Hanchett, Warner and Brooke families. A Mrs Brooke held more than 280 acres (110 ha) in 1810 and died leaving the estate to her children in 1812. They were allocated 160 acres (65 ha) south of the village in the inclosure of 1814, which they then sold to Clare College, Cambridge in 1819. The college still owned the farm in 1972.

Mowbrays seems to have had no manor house in the 14th century but there may have been one in 1438. The present house called Mowbrays in Church Street is a late 15th- or early 16th-century timber-framed, jettied, gabled building, which originally had a central hall and two cross-wings. Late in the 17th century it was raised to two storeys and a west wing was added. Red-brick diagonal chimneystacks were built, which have the date 1690 scratched on them. The back of the house is decorated with pargetting. Mowbrays is a Grade II* listed building.

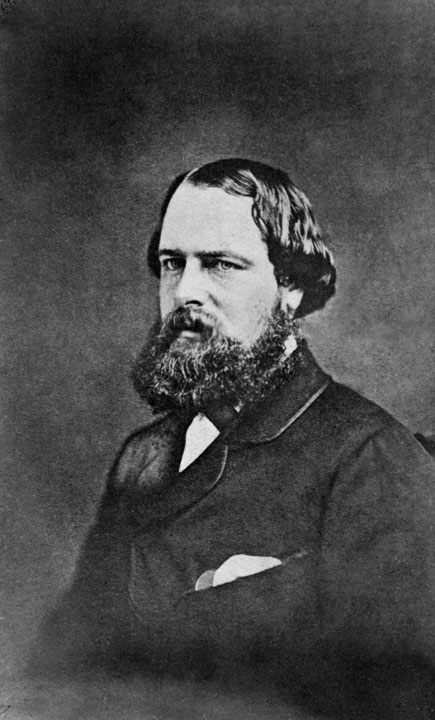
Sir Robert Herbert, Lord of the Manor 1859–1905, encouraged many of Ickleton's young men to emigrate to Queensland

=== Later history ===
After 1538 the manors of Hovells, Caldress and Durhams, along with the estate of the former Ickleton Priory (see below) descended together, but legally remained separate entities. In 1600 Martin Heton, the new Bishop of Ely, surrendered the four manors to the Crown, which in 1602 sold them to a John Wood of nearby Hinxton, who had already been leasing the land. In 1623 Wood sold the combined estate to the Holgate family of Saffron Walden, with whom it remained until at least 1717.

By 1719 the Holgates had sold the estate to the Irish peer Henry O'Brien, 8th Earl of Thomond. Ickleton was inherited by the 8th Earl's nephew Percy Wyndham-O'Brien, 1st Earl of Thomond in 1741 and by George Wyndham, 3rd Earl of Egremont in 1774. The 3rd Earl gave Ickleton to his younger brother the Hon. Percy Charles Wyndham in 1784, who thereafter lived at Caldress Manor.

In 1833 Wyndham left Ickleton Manor to his nephew Algernon Herbert, an Oxford scholar and antiquary who became a barrister of the Inner Temple. Herbert died at Ickleton in 1855, leaving the manor to his young son Robert Herbert (born 1831), who also became a barrister at the Inner Temple but made his career as a colonial civil servant. Robert (later Sir Robert) Herbert never married, and died at Ickleton in 1905 leaving the manor to a descendant of his uncle Rev. William Herbert. The estate eventually descended to William Herbert's great-grandson Percy Mundy, who died in 1959.

== Priory, weekly market and annual fair ==
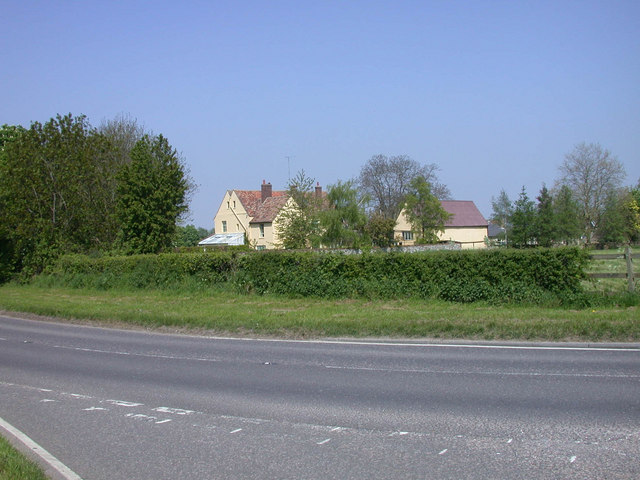
Abbey Farm, said to be on the site of Ickleton Priory

Ickleton Priory was a small house of Benedictine nuns, founded in the mid-12th century. It existed certainly by 1181 and may have been founded in or before 1163. The priory was dedicated to St Mary Magdalene. The priory was neither large nor wealthy, but it became Ickleton's principal manor and dominated the life of the parish. By 1536 it held 714 acres (289 ha) of the cultivated land in the parish, but in that year the priory was suppressed in the Dissolution of the Monasteries and the last prioress was pensioned off by the Crown.

A charter issued under Henry III between 1222 and 1227 granted the prioress the right to hold at Ickleton a weekly market, an annual fair and a court leet. The charter may have been in confirmation of an earlier one that the priory claimed was granted by King Stephen. The market was every Thursday and the annual fair was on the feast of St Mary Magdalene, 22 July.

The annual fair survived the priory's suppression. In the latter part of the 16th century it was still being held in the former priory's barnyard, still took place around the feast day of St Mary Magdalene, and lasted five days. In the 18th and early 19th century it was a one-day event on the feast day itself, trading mainly in horses and cheese. In 1872 the fair was owned by the farmer of Abbey Farm when the Home Secretary, Henry Bruce, abolished Ickleton Fair under the Fairs Act 1871.

== Rectory ==
In the Middle Ages the parish rectory lands were appropriated to Ickleton Priory and treated as a single estate with the priory's own lands. When the priory was suppressed in 1536 the combined estate passed to the Crown (see above) so the rectory continued only as tithes from the parishioners. In 1547 the Crown granted Ickleton rectory to the Dean and Canons of Windsor. By 1579 the Wood family, tenants of the demesne, were in dispute with the Dean and Canons over tithe payments. The dispute was still continuing in 1620, despite consistent court judgement in favour of the Dean and Canons. Eventually the tithes were commuted from payment in kind to money in lieu. In 1776 the Dean and Canons proposed reverting to payments in kind, to which the villagers objected. In the inclosure of 1814 the Dean and Canons received 640.5 acres (259.2 ha) in lieu of tithes.

The Dean and Canons leased the rectory and hence the tithe income. Lessees included the Dean of Arches, William Bird from 1615 to 1624 and Sir William Acton, 1st Baronet from 1630. Lessees after the inclosure of 1814 included Lieutenant-General William Inglis in 1861–62. In 1867 the Dean and Canons' estates were vested in the Ecclesiastical Commissioners. The Commissioners sold the estate in 1920.

== Places of worship ==
=== Church of England ===
The Anglican parish church is St Mary Magdalene Church, Ickleton.

=== Early Dissenters ===
By 1669 a few villagers in Ickleton were Dissenters, probably Quakers. The number of Dissenters slowly grew, and in 1690 they invited two ministers from Cambridge to preach at Ickleton every third Sunday. Their numbers remained small throughout the 18th century, for most of which time they used a barn as their meeting-place. The congregation had no resident minister, relying instead on ministers from Cambridge, Linton and Saffron Walden.

=== Congregationalism ===
In 1842 a Congregational chapel and schoolhouse were built in Ickleton. The chapel was successful enough to be enlarged in 1876 and 1896, after which it could seat 200 people and was served fortnightly by the Congregational minister from Duxford. It was closed in about 1954, sold in 1956 and derelict by 1972.

=== Methodism ===
In 1824 there were Methodists meeting in two houses in Ickleton. The 1851 Census recorded 80 people meeting for evening worship led by a Primitive Methodist minister from Saffron Walden. The Primitive Methodist chapel in Abbey Street was built the following year, in 1852. It could seat 160 people, and in 1877 had 95 people in its congregation. The chapel was still in use for worship in 1972 but has since closed.

=== Salvation Army ===
The Salvation Army briefly ministered in Ickleton, having a hall that was recorded in 1899 and 1903.

== Economic and social history ==
=== Population ===
The number of Ickleton's inhabitants has been in the low hundreds throughout its history. Early documents record the number of tenants, households or adults rather than total population, so there are no precise figures until the 1801 Census. The number of tenants rose from 43 at the time of the Domesday Book in 1086 to 115 in the Hundred Rolls of 1279. The number of households was 68 in 1563 and 65 in 1662, but rose sharply to 98 in 1666. In 1707 there were 120 families and in the 1801 Census there were 121, and this first census counted a total population of 493 people. The population grew for the next half-century, peaking at 813 in the 1851 Census.

Ickleton depended almost entirely on farming and in 1707 many of the families had been poor. Both conditions still applied 150 years later, so many of Ickleton's young men emigrated. Robert Herbert, who inherited the Manor of Ickleton in 1855 and joined the colonial service, encouraged many of them to settle in Queensland, Australia. Herbert was Premier of Queensland 1859–66 and a civil servant at the Colonial Office in London 1866–92.

After 1851 Ickleton's population fell for seven decades, until after the First World War the 1921 Census recorded a low of 543 people. Thereafter the number slowly increased again, but then reached a new low of 526 in the 1971 Census. Since then it has increased substantially, possibly encouraged by the arrival of the M11 motorway in 1979 and the electrification of the railway to Liverpool Street in 1987 (see Transport, below). The 2011 Census recorded a parish population of 709.

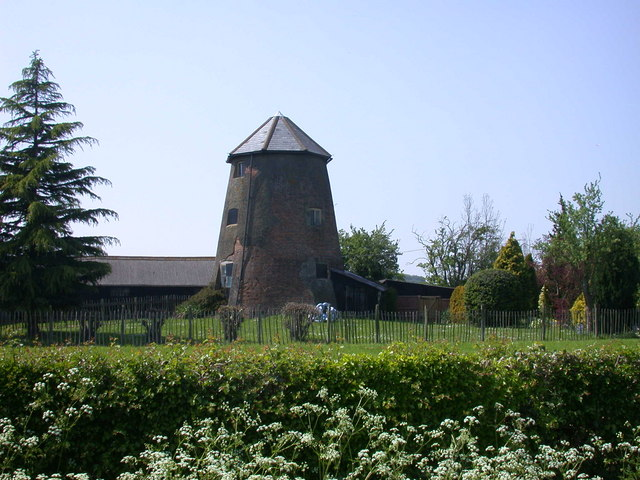
Ickleton's early 19th-century former tower mill, now a private house

=== Mills ===
The Domesday Book records that in 1086 the parish had two watermills, presumably on the River Cam. One was at Ickleton itself, and the other was at Brookhampton just north of the village. By 1432 the road now called Mill Lane was called the fulling-mill street. The mill at the village had gone by 1545, but in 1818 a new watermill was built on the south side of the village. In 1927 the last miller was killed in the water-wheel and the mill was closed.

By 1432 one of the hills of the parish was called Windmill Hill, suggesting that the parish had a windmill by then. By 1545 the windmill was on or close to its present site, about 0.5 miles (800 m) northwest of the village, west of Duxford Road. Early in the 19th century it was replaced with a brick-built tower mill. The mill closed soon after 1900, and by 1925 it had been converted into a house.

=== Historic houses ===
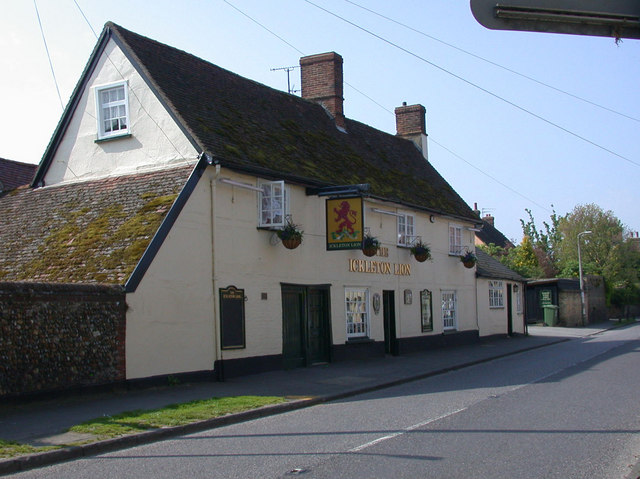
The Ickleton Lion, the only pub still trading in the village

The village prospered in the 15th and 16th centuries. A number of buildings survive from that time: Mowbrays in Church Street has already been noted (see Lesser estates, above). Padcot in Abbey Street is another Grade II* listed building dating from about 1500. It is a timber-framed building, originally one house and later divided into two cottages. It was built as a hall house, but early in the 17th century a floor was inserted in part of the house. The house has a cross wing with a crown post roof.

=== Public houses ===
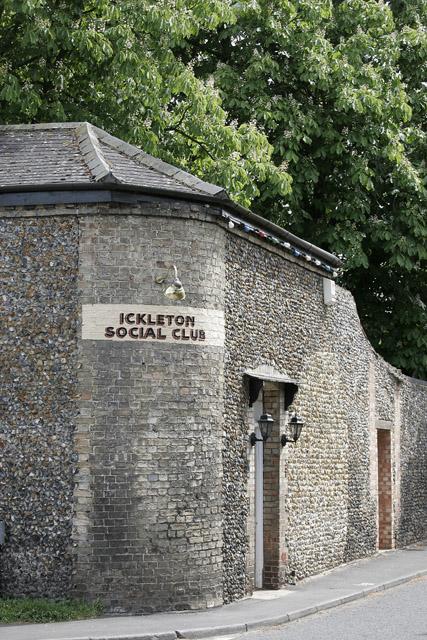
Ickleton Social Club

Ickleton has had a number of public houses. In 1592 there was the Bell, and in the same century there was an inn that may have been called the Rose. In the 17th century there was the White Lion, which was in Church Street south of the village green and burnt down before 1699. The Chequer was built in the same site and was recorded in 1778. By 1847 it was called the Duke of Wellington. In about 1957 it ceased trading and it is now a private house. It is a timber-framed building from the end of the 17th century with 19th-century additions.

By 1728 there was a pub in Abbey Street called the Lion. This may be the same as the Red Lion recorded in 1800, which is a timber-framed building dating from about 1700 with 18th and 19th century alterations. It is currently called The Lion at Ickleton and is a community owned and run pub.

There was a New Inn in Brookhampton Street that was trading in 1884. and The Greyhound in the south of the parish on the edge of Great Chesterford was open by 1851 and still trading in 1972. It closed before the end of the 20th century.

As well as the Ickleton Lion, the village has a social club.

=== Schools ===
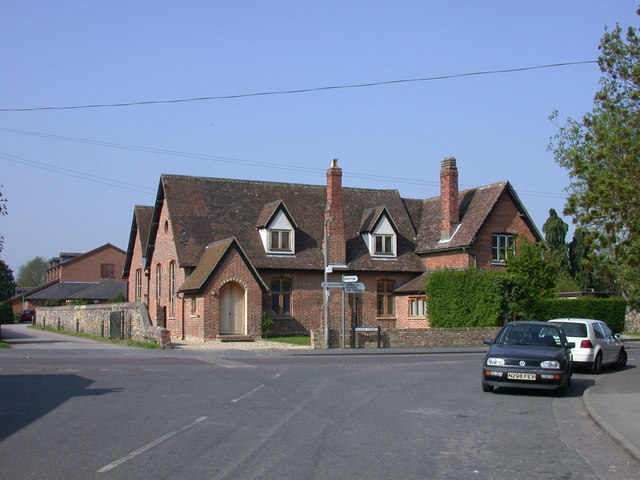
Former parish school, now the village hall

There are records from 1601 and 1625 that Ickleton had a schoolmaster, and from 1638 and 1678 that part of the church was used as the schoolroom. However, the school later lapsed and it was not until 1804 that the vicar started a Sunday school. There was a day school in the parish by 1825 and two by 1833, which seem to have been dame schools.

In 1846 a British School was opened in the Congregational chapel's schoolroom. It had 70 pupils an 1870, was still open in 1888 but there is no later record of it.

The vicar started a Church of England day school in about 1848 in a room in Mill Lane. A purpose-built school and schoolmaster's house for the school in Church Street were completed in 1871 and enlarged in 1884. The number of pupils increased from 57 in 1872 to 103 in 1888. The school closed in 1961, was bought by the village and converted into the village hall.

=== Transport ===
In 1845 the Eastern Counties Railway opened its extension from Newport (Essex) down the Cam Valley to Cambridge, Ely and beyond. The line crosses the river at Ickleton and skirts the eastern edge of the parish. The nearest station is across the river at Great Chesterford, about 1.6 miles (2.6 km) southeast of Ickleton village. British Rail electrified the line in 1987. It is now the West Anglia Main Line.

In 1979 the M11 Motorway was extended from Stansted in Essex to Stump Cross, about 1 mile (1.6 km) east of Ickleton on the Essex–Cambridgeshire boundary. In 1980 the motorway was extended again, from Junction 9 to Cambridge, passing through Ickleton parish only about 100 yards (91 m) west of the village.

== Current amenities ==
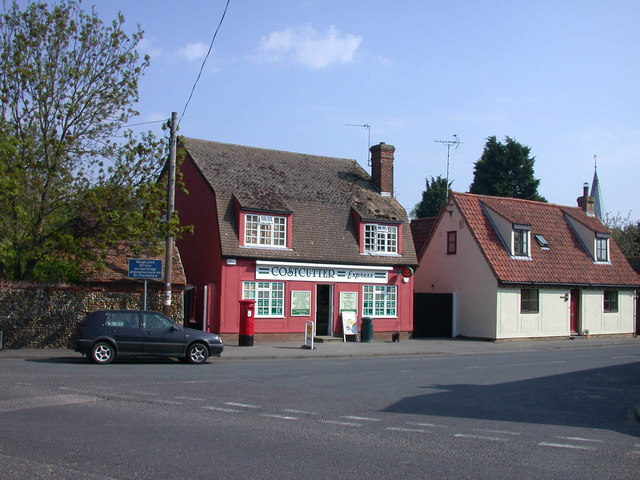
The village shop and post office

As well as The Lion at Ickleton and Ickleton Social Club, the village has village shop and a few small businesses providing employment in the village, notably Team Consulting, a medical device design & development consultancy, based at the Abbey Barns business campus.

== See also ==
- The Hundred Parishes

== Sources ==
- Mills, A.D.; Room, A. (2003). A Dictionary of British Place-Names. Oxford: Oxford University Press. ISBN 0198527586.
- Pevsner, Nikolaus (1970) [1954]. Cambridgeshire. The Buildings of England. Harmondsworth: Penguin Books. pp. 411–412. ISBN 0-14-071010-8.
- Salzman, L.F., ed. (1948). "The Priory of Ickleton". A History of the County of Cambridge and the Isle of Ely: Volume 2. Victoria County History. pp. 223–226.
- Wright, A.P.M. (editor); Rosen, Adrienne B.; Keeling, Susan M.; Meekings, C.A.F. (1978). "Ickleton". A History of the County of Cambridge and the Isle of Ely: Volume 6. Victoria County History. pp. 230–246.
