= Chippenham Preceptory =

Monastery in Cambridgeshire, England

Coordinates: 52.3005°N 0.4388°E

Chippenham Preceptory was a preceptory in Cambridgeshire, England. It was established in 1184 and was dissolved in 1540.
