= Fairs Act 1871 =

Act of the Parliament of the United Kingdom

Fairs Act 1871 (Note: Section 1.)
- Act of Parliament
- Parliament of the United Kingdom
- Long title: An Act to further amend the Law relating to Fairs in England and Wales.
- Citation: 34 & 35 Vict. c. 12
- Territorial extent: United Kingdom

Dates
- Royal assent: 25 May 1871
- Commencement: 25 May 1871 (Note: The Acts of Parliament (Commencement) Act 1793.)

Status: Current legislation

Text of statute as originally enacted

Revised text of statute as amended

Text of the Fairs Act 1871 as in force today (including any amendments) within the United Kingdom, from legislation.gov.uk.

The Fairs Act 1871 (34 & 35 Vict. c. 12) is an act of the Parliament of the United Kingdom. It empowered the Home Secretary in the United Kingdom to, on petition, make orders for the abolition of fairs. Such provision was made at this time by Parliament because many fairs traditionally held in early Victorian England were, according to the preamble to the act, held to be

1. unnecessary,
2. the cause of grievous immorality, and
3. very injurious to the inhabitants of the towns in which such fairs are held

Whereas certain of the fairs held in England and Wales are unnecessary, are the cause of grievous immorality, and are very injurious to the inhabitants of the towns in which such fairs are held, and it is therefore expedient to make provision to facilitate the abolition of such fairs:

Fairs abolished under the act included Ickleton Fair in Cambridgeshire and St Matthew's Fair in Bury St Edmunds, Suffolk.
