= St Edmund's Priory, Cambridge =

Priory in Cambridgeshire, England

St Edmund's Priory, Cambridge was a priory in Cambridgeshire, England. It was established in 1291 and was dissolved in 1539.
