= Barham Friary =

Crutched Friars friary in Linton, England

Coordinates: 52°5′27.8″N 0°17′52.81″E

Barham Friary was a Crutched Friars friary in Linton, Cambridgeshire, England. It was established around 1272 or 1293 and was probably a daughter house of Welnetham, Suffolk. Its patron was Robert de Furneaux. The friary was dissolved in 1538, though its chapel of St Margaret survived until the eighteenth century. The site is occupied by the nineteenth century Barham Hall.
