= St Ives Priory =

Priory in Cambridgeshire, England

Coordinates: 52.3220°N 0.0721°W

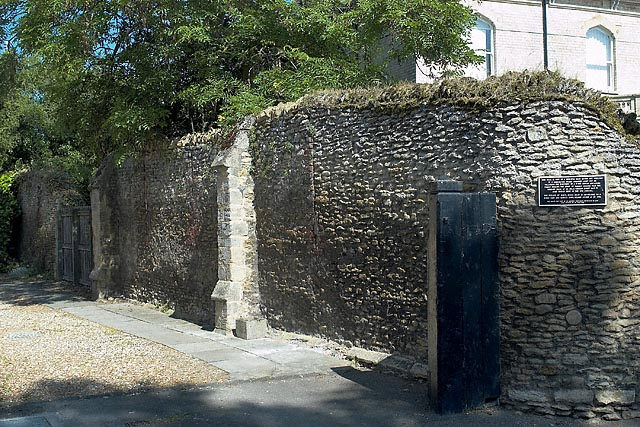
Remains of a Priory wall.

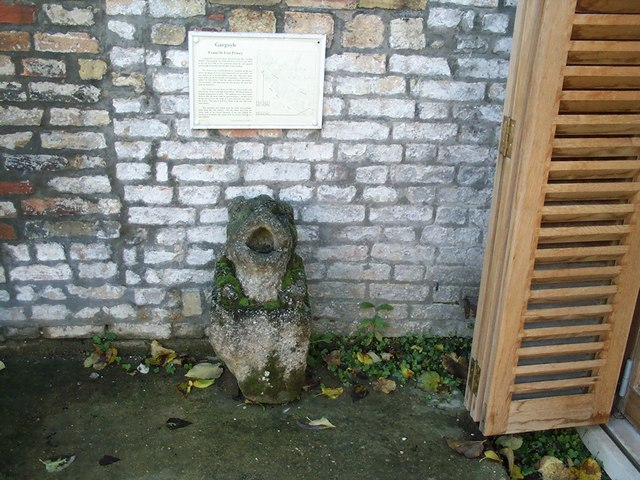
Gargoyle from the Priory.

St Ives Priory was a priory in Cambridgeshire, England. It was established in 1017 by monks from Ramsey Abbey.
