= Cambridge Whitefriars =

Carmelite friary in Cambridgeshire, England

Coordinates: 52.1981°N 0.1084°E

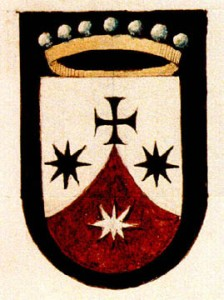
Coat of arms of the Carmelite order

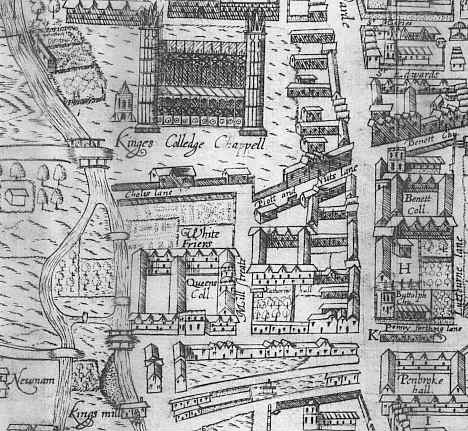
Richard Lyne, 1574: Map of Cambridge, detail of site of Whitefriars church, N. of Queens' College

The Cambridge Whitefriars, or Newnham Whitefriars, were a community of Carmelite friars who first settled in Chesterton outside Cambridge in the thirteenth century. Although granted permission by Henry III to build a house there in 1247, they instead moved into a house in Newnham donated to them by Michael Malherbe in 1249. It was situated in the parish of St-Peter-outside-the-gate in Trumpington and so fell under the jurisdiction of the Hospital of St John the Evangelist. Extensive monastic cells, a cloister and a church were constructed on three acres of land in Newnham. In 1290, however, because frequent flooding made it difficult to attend lectures and acquire provisions, the friars obtained permission from Edward I to move to land on Milne Street within Cambridge. They remained there from 1292 until 1538, when, as a result of the dissolution of the monasteries under Henry VIII, their property was handed over to Queens' College, who demolished the monastic buildings. The site is now occupied by Walnut Tree Court and the college chapel. The only surviving remains can be seen in the well-preserved north wall of the Fellows' Garden, which formed the north wall of the Carmelite church. The locations of the sites in Chesterton and Newnham are unknown.
