= Duxford Preceptory =

Preceptory in Berkshire, England

Duxford Preceptory was a preceptory in Cambridgeshire, England. It was established in 1273.
