= Duxford =

Village in Cambridgeshire, England

Coordinates: 52.093°N 0.159°E

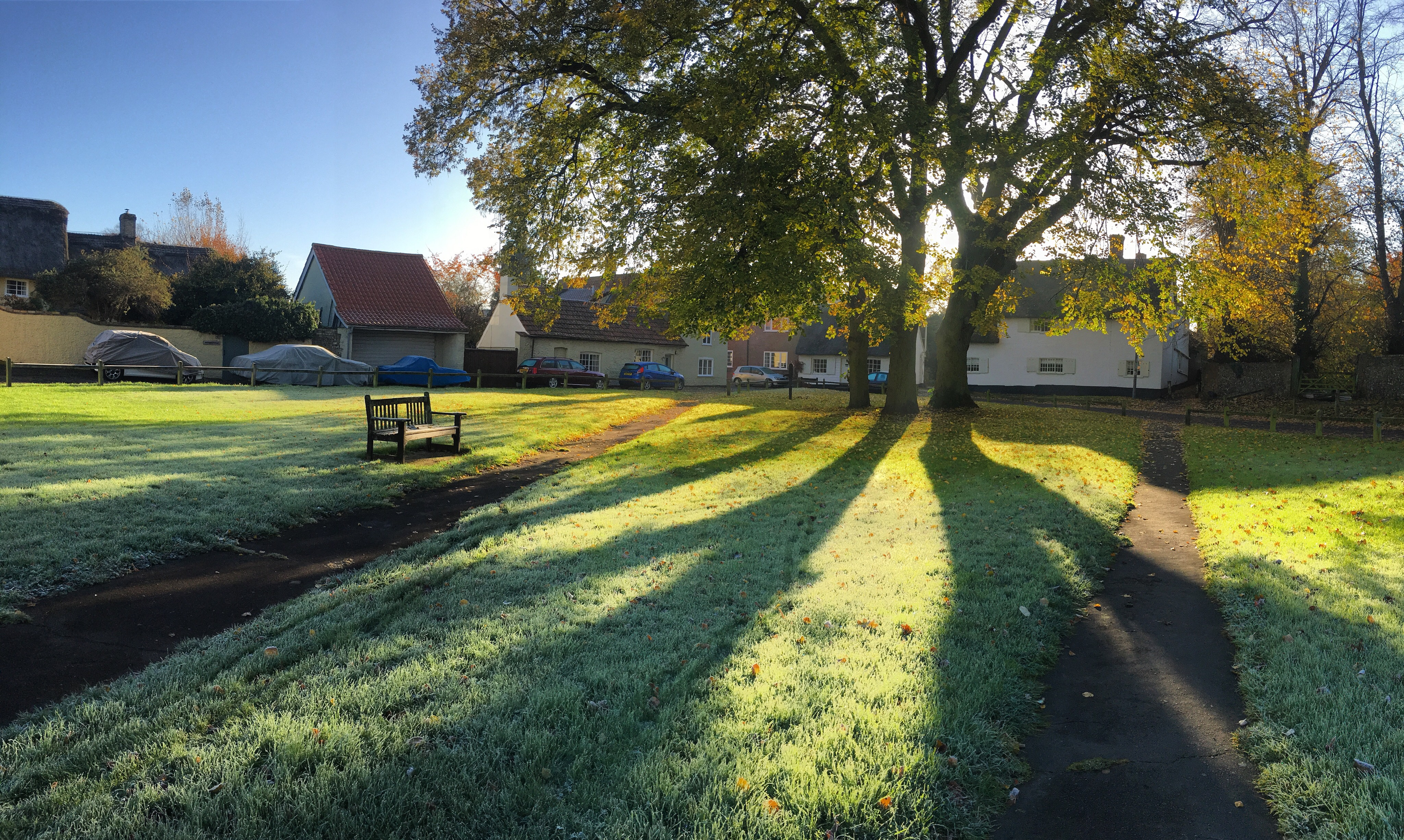
- The Green, Duxford (November 2017)

- Location within Cambridgeshire
- Population: 1,836; 2,099 (2011 Census)
- OS grid reference: TL481461
- District: South Cambridgeshire
- Shire county: Cambridgeshire
- Region: East
- Country: England
- Sovereign state: United Kingdom
- Post town: Cambridge
- Postcode district: CB22
- Dialling code: 01223
- Police: Cambridgeshire
- Fire: Cambridgeshire
- Ambulance: East of England
- UK Parliament: South Cambridgeshire

Duxford is a village in Cambridgeshire, England, about 10 miles (16 km) south of Cambridge. It is part of the Hundred Parishes area.

== History ==
The village formed on the banks of the River Cam, a little below its emergence from the hills of north Essex. One of the more populous settlements in its hundred, it was split into two ecclesiastical parishes in medieval times until they were united in 1834.

Originally known as Duxworth and listed as Dukeswrthe in the 10th century, and Dochesuuorde in the Domesday Book of 1086, the village's name comes from "Worth (enclosure) of a man called Duc".

== Churches ==
The village has two Grade I listed medieval parish churches, St John's Church and St Peter's Church. The two parishes were combined in 1874, services being held thereafter at St Peter's; St John's remained a chapel of ease and finally declared redundant. Still consecrated, it is now in the care of The Churches Conservation Trust. The churchyard has been cleared of headstones and is maintained by Duxford Parish Council. To the north of the village close to the Royston to Newmarket road lies Duxford Chapel, a 14th-century chantry chapel that was probably part of the Hospital of St John. St Peter's is part of a small group of churches along with St Mary Magdalene, Ickleton and St Mary & St John, Hinxton. They are known jointly as 'Hinkledux' and services are divided between the three parishes. St Peter's has a bell-ringing group and hosts a pre-school meet up for new parents known as Tiddlers.

A Congregational chapel was built in the late 18th century and licensed in 1794, and at its peak in 1850 had a weekly congregation of 350. The chapel joined with other Congregational churches in uniting with the Presbyterian Church of England in 1972, and was known as Duxford United Reformed Church. It is listed Grade II. The final service was held here was in June 2019 and it was sold for conversion to residences in 2021. It is now two separate residences, one of which is an Air BnB for short-term lets.

== Airfield ==
Duxford gives its name to RAF Duxford (now called Duxford Aerodrome), a former Royal Air Force airfield that was used as a sector station during the Battle of Britain. Duxford Aerodrome was the home of Douglas Bader's Big Wing during that battle. Duxford airfield later became a fighter airfield for the United States Army Air Forces operating P-47 Thunderbolt aircraft. In 1972 the Ministry of Defence began to house historically important aircraft in the hangars, which in 1977 became the Imperial War Museum Duxford.

The airfield was used in the motion picture The Battle of Britain. During that production one of the hangars was blown up to simulate a Luftwaffe bombing raid. There are currently three all-weekend air shows a year which have good visibility from the village and it is common to see planes flying over the village, either leisure flights or in essential practice.

== Village life ==
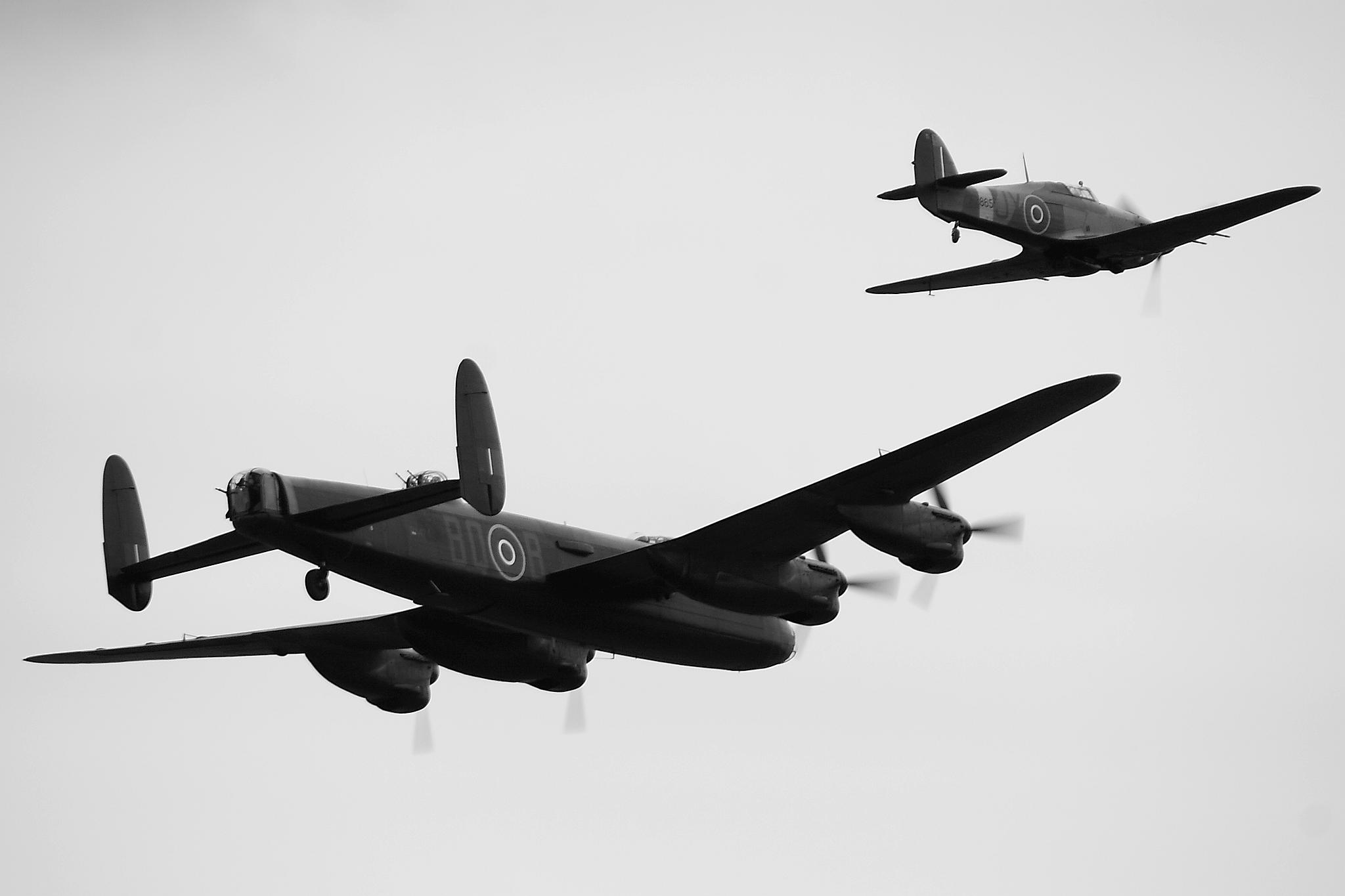
A Hawker Hurricane and Avro Lancaster participating in an air show at IWM Duxford

Until 2022 the village held a popular annual Advent Market at St John's Church which granted funds for local community projects. There is an annual Soap Box Derby every September which, since 2013, has raised £86,350 for Cancer Research UK. There is a Duxford Women's Institute, and a well-supported bowls club. The National Garden Scheme sees several private gardens open to the public for one day a year including Robynet House and Duxford Mill. The local football team is Duxford United FC who play their home games on the recreation ground on Hunts Road. The Duxford Lawn Tennis Club has two courts on the same ground. The school is a Church of England Primary School in the Diocese of Ely which has a breakfast and after-school club (DX) and a playgroup on site.

In May 2019, the foundations of a new village community centre were dug and the finished building was opened to the public in May 2020. It is now a thriving hub hosting many village and private events, social groups and meetings. A new public green space was opened in 2020 known as Brewery Field; its landscaping is ongoing, including planting, sowing of chalk upland flowers and plants and public utility installations.

On 31 July 2020, a fire gutted the pre-school of Duxford School. It was rebuilt and reopened in 2023. In 2022, a new history society for village began and is resident, once a month, at the Duxford Community Centre.

The village currently has two remaining pubs – The John Barleycorn and The Plough. Other former pubs and ale houses include The Wheatsheaf (which re-opened in 2018 as Graystones deli/cafe), the Three Horseshoes, first recorded in 1786, the King's Head which opened in the mid-19th century, the Flower Pot, located at the end of the old airfield runway on what is now Hunts Road, The Brewer's Arms on The Green, The Elms, long since disappeared in the 18th century and The Red Lion, now in the parish of Whittlesford.

As at 2024 there have been two successful Festivals of Nature which have attracted large crowds keen to find out about biodiversity, the environment and ways the community can help wildlife and nature locally.

== See also ==
- The Hundred Parishes
