= Shingay Preceptory =

Knights Hospitaller priory in Cambridgeshire, England

Coordinates: 52°06′31″N 0°05′17″W

Shingay Preceptory was a Knights Hospitaller priory at Shingay in Cambridgeshire, England. It was established in 1144. The moated site is a scheduled ancient monument.
