= English Dissenters =

Protestant Separatists from the Church of England

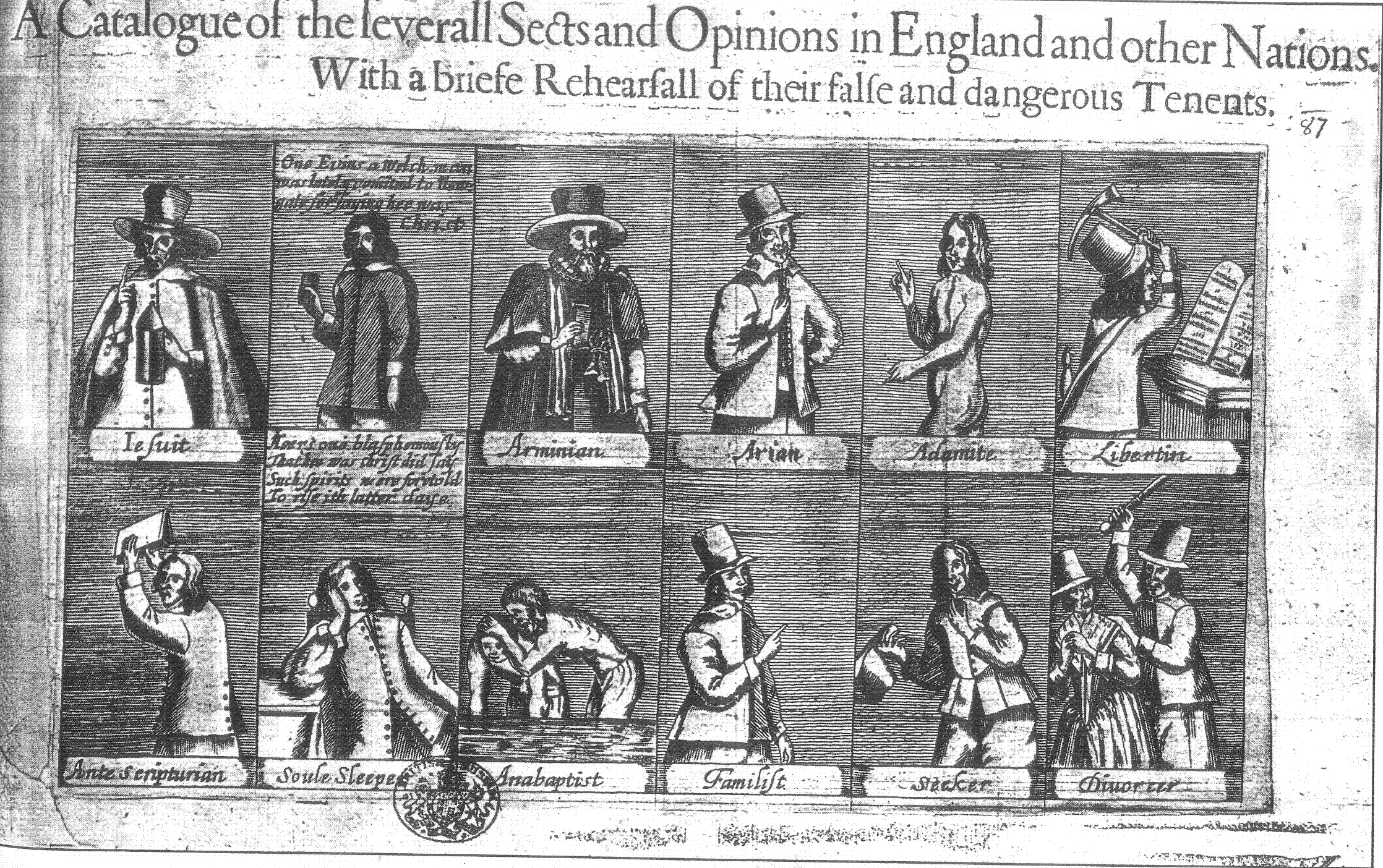
A Catalogue of the Severall Sects and Opinions in England and other Nations: With a briefe Rehearsall of their false and dangerous Tenents, a propaganda broadsheet denouncing English dissenters from 1647.

English Dissenters or English Separatists were Protestants who separated from the Church of England between the 16th and 19th centuries. English Dissenters opposed state interference in religious matters and founded their own churches, educational institutions and communities. They tended to see the established church as too Catholic, but did not agree on what should be done about it.

Some Dissenters emigrated to the New World, especially to the Thirteen Colonies and Canada. Brownists founded the Plymouth Colony. The English Dissenters played a pivotal role in the religious development of the United States and greatly diversified the religious landscape. Some originally agitated for a wide-reaching Protestant Reformation of the established Church of England, and they flourished during the Protectorate under Oliver Cromwell.

King James I had said "no bishop, no king", emphasising the role of the clergy in justifying royal legitimacy. Cromwell capitalised on that phrase, abolishing both upon founding the Commonwealth of England. After the restoration of the monarchy in 1660, the episcopacy was reinstalled, and the rights of the Dissenters were limited: the Act of Uniformity 1662 required Anglican ordination for all clergy, and many instead withdrew from the state church. These ministers and their followers came to be known as Nonconformists, though originally this term referred to refusal to use certain vestments and ceremonies of the Church of England, rather than separation from it.

Certain denominations of English Dissenters gained prominence throughout the world. The Baptists, the Congregationalists, and the Quakers of the 17th century, and the Methodists of the 18th century, remain major Christian denominations.

== Organised dissenting groups (17th century) ==
In existence during the English Interregnum (1649–1660):

=== Anabaptists ===
Anabaptist (literally, "baptised again") was a term given to those Reformation Christians who rejected the notion of infant baptism in favour of believer's baptism. Though there is little evidence for Anabaptism in Britain later than the Elizabethan era, following their severe persecution by Henry VIII and Mary.

=== Baptists ===
Baptist historian Bruce Gourley outlines four main views of Baptist origins:

- The modern scholarly consensus that the movement traces its origin to the 17th century via the English Separatists.
- The view that it was an outgrowth of the Anabaptist movement of believer's baptism begun in 1525 on the European continent.
- The perpetuity view, which assumes that the Baptist faith and practice has existed since the time of Christ.
- The successionist view, or "Baptist successionism", which argues that Baptist churches actually existed in an unbroken chain since the time of Christ.

=== Barrowists ===
Henry Barrowe maintained the right and duty of the church to carry out necessary reforms without awaiting the permission of the civil power; and advocated congregational independence. He regarded the whole established church order as polluted by the relics of Roman Catholicism and insisted on separation as essential to pure worship and discipline.

=== Behmenists ===
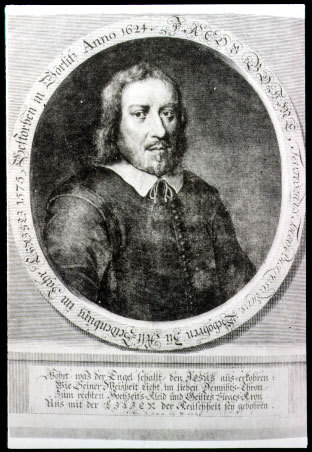
Idealized portrait of Böhme from Theosophia Revelata (1730)

The Behmenists religious movement began on continental Europe and took its ideas from the writings of Jakob Böhme (Behmen being one of the adaptations of his name used in England), a German mystic and theosopher who claimed divine revelation. In the 1640s his works appeared in England, and English Behmenists developed. Eventually, some of these merged with the Quakers of the time.

Böhme's writings primarily concerned the nature of sin, evil and redemption. Consistent with Lutheran theology, Böhme believed that humanity had fallen from a state of divine grace into a state of sin and suffering, that the forces of evil included fallen angels who had rebelled against God, and subsequently that God's goal was to restore the world to a state of grace. However, in some ways, Behmenist belief deviated significantly from traditional Lutheran belief. For example, Böhme rejected the concepts of sola fide and sola gratia.

=== Brownists ===
By 1580, Robert Browne had become a leader in the movement for a congregational form of organisation for the Church of England and attempted to set up a separate Congregational Church in Norwich, Norfolk, England. He was arrested but released on the advice of William Cecil, his kinsman. Browne and his companions moved to Middelburg in the Netherlands in 1581. He returned to England in 1585 and to the Church of England, being employed as a schoolmaster and parish priest.

=== Diggers ===
The Diggers were an English group of Protestant agrarian communists, begun by Gerrard Winstanley as True Levellers in 1649, who became known as Diggers due to their activities. Their original name came from their belief in economic equality based upon a specific passage in the Book of Acts. The Diggers tried (by "levelling" real property) to reform the existing social order with an agrarian lifestyle based on their ideas for the creation of small egalitarian rural communities. They were one of several nonconformist dissenting groups that emerged around this time.

=== Enthusiasts ===
Several Protestant sects of the 16th and 17th centuries were called Enthusiastic. During the years that immediately followed the Glorious Revolution, "enthusiasm" was a British pejorative term for advocacy of any political or religious cause in public. Such "enthusiasm" was seen as the cause of the English Civil War and its attendant atrocities, and thus it was a social sin to remind others of the war by engaging in enthusiasm. During the 18th century, popular Methodists such as John Wesley and George Whitefield were accused of blind enthusiasm (i.e., fanaticism), a charge against which they defended themselves by distinguishing fanaticism from "religion of the heart".

=== Familists ===
The Familia Caritatis ("Family of Love", or the "Familists") were a religious sect that began in continental Europe in the 16th century. Members of this religious group were devout followers of Dutch mystic Hendrik Niclaes. The Familists believed that Niclaes was the only person who truly knew how to achieve a state of perfection, and his texts attracted followers in Germany, France, and England.

The Familists were secretive and wary of outsiders. For example, they wished death upon those outside of the Family of Love, and re-marriage after the death of a spouse could only take place between men and women of the same Familist congregation. Additionally, they would not discuss their ideas and opinions with outsiders and sought to remain undetected by ordinary members of society: they tended to be members of an established church so as not to attract suspicion and showed respect for authority.

The group was considered heretical in 16th-century England. Among their beliefs were that there existed a time before Adam and Eve; Heaven and Hell were both present on Earth; and that all things were ruled by nature and not directed by God. The Familists continued to exist until the middle of the 17th century, when they were absorbed into the Quaker movement.

=== Fifth Monarchists ===
The Fifth Monarchists or Fifth Monarchy Men were Nonconformists who were active from 1649 to 1661 during the Interregnum. They took their name from a prophecy in the Book of Daniel that four ancient monarchies (Babylonian, Persian, Macedonian, and Roman) would precede Christ's return. They also referred to the year 1666 and its relationship to the biblical Number of the Beast indicating the end of earthly rule by carnal human beings.

=== Grindletonians ===
Grindletonians were people accused of extreme antinomianism. In a sermon preached at St Paul's Cross on 11 February 1627, and published under the title "The White Wolfe" in 1627, Stephen Denison, minister of St Katharine Cree in London, charged the 'Gringltonian [sic] familists' with holding nine points of an antinomian tendency. These nine points are repeated from Denison by Ephraim Pagit in 1645 and Alexander Ross in 1655. In 1635 John Webster, curate at Kildwick in North Yorkshire, was charged before a church court with being a Grindletonian, and simultaneously in New England John Winthrop thought that Anne Hutchinson was one. The last known Grindletonian died in the 1680s.

=== Levellers ===
The Levellers was a political movement during the English Civil War that emphasised popular sovereignty, extended suffrage, equality before the law and religious tolerance. Levellers tended to hold a notion of "natural rights" that had been violated by the king's side in the civil wars. At the Putney Debates in 1647, Colonel Thomas Rainsborough defended natural rights as coming from the law of God expressed in the Bible.

=== Muggletonians ===
The Muggletonians, named after Lodowicke Muggleton, were a small Protestant Christian movement which began in 1651 when two London tailors announced they were the last prophets foretold in the biblical Book of Revelation. The group grew out of the Ranters and in opposition to the Quakers. Muggletonian beliefs include a hostility to philosophical reason, a scriptural understanding of how the universe works, and a belief that God appeared directly on Earth as Christ Jesus. A consequential belief is that God takes no notice of everyday events on Earth and will not generally intervene until it is to bring the world to an end.

Muggletonians avoided all forms of worship or preaching and, in the past, met only for discussion and socialising amongst members. The movement was egalitarian, apolitical, and pacifist, and resolutely avoided evangelism. Members attained a degree of public notoriety by cursing those who reviled their faith.

=== Philadelphians ===
The Philadelphians, or the Philadelphian Society, were a Protestant 17th-century religious group in England. They were organised around John Pordage, an Anglican priest from Bradfield, Berkshire, who had been ejected from his parish in 1655 because of differing views, but was then reinstated in 1660 during the English Restoration. Pordage was attracted to the ideas of Jakob Böhme.

=== Puritans ===
The Puritans were a major grouping of English Protestants in the 16th and 17th centuries. They had a major influence in the colonies. Puritanism in this sense was founded by some Marian exiles from the clergy shortly after the accession of Queen Elizabeth I in 1558, as an activist movement within the Church of England. The designation "Puritan" is often used incorrectly, based on the assumption that hedonism and puritanism are antonyms: historically, the word was used to characterise the Protestant group as extremists similar to the Cathari of France, and according to Thomas Fuller in his Church History, dated back to 1564. Archbishop Matthew Parker used "puritan" and "precisian" with the sense of stickler. T. D. Bozeman therefore uses instead the term precisianist in regard to the historical groups of England and New England.

=== Quakers ===
The Quakers began as a loosely knit group of preachers, many of whom had previously been Seekers. George Fox's journal attributes the name "Quaker" to a judge in 1650 calling them Quakers "because I bid them tremble before the Lord". George Fox, often regarded as the father of Quakerism, taught that apart from Christ himself, there was "none upon the earth" that could cure unbelief and sinfulness. The inward experience of Christ, confirmed by the Bible, was the foundation of the Religious Society of Friends. The following characterized the Quaker message:

1) an in-breaking of God's power;

2) a realization of how sinful the believer's life had been, how far it had fallen short;

3) the chance to repent and accept new life;

4) the experience of regeneration;

5) an impulse to gather with others who had had this experience;

6) mission to those who had not yet had this experience.

Additionally, Fox taught the doctrine of perfection—"spiritual intimacy with God and Christ, entailing an ability to resist sin and temptation". Quakers commonly do a practice of unprogrammed worship where the congregation waits in silence waiting for inspiration from the Holy Spirit before doing anything letting the meetings structure work out on its own, similar to seekers.

=== Ranters ===
The Ranters were a sect in the time of the Commonwealth who were regarded as heretical by the established Church of that period. Their central idea was pantheistic, that God is essentially in every creature; this led them to deny the authority of the church, of scripture, of the current ministry and of services, instead calling on men to hearken to Jesus within them.

Many Ranters seem to have rejected a belief in immortality and in a personal God, and in many ways they resemble the Brethren of the Free Spirit in the 14th century. The Ranters revived the Brethren of the Free Spirit's beliefs of amoralism and followed the Brethren's ideals which "stressed the desire to surpass the human condition and become godlike". Further drawing from the Brethren of the Free Spirit, the Ranters embraced antinomianism and believed that Christians are freed by grace from the necessity of obeying Mosaic Law. Because they believed that God is present in all living creatures, the Ranters' adherence to antinomianism allowed them to reject the very notion of obedience, thus making them a great threat to the stability of the government.

=== Sabbatarians ===
Sabbatarians were known in England from the time of Elizabeth I. Access to the Bible in English allowed anyone who could read English to study scripture and question church doctrines. While First-day Sabbatarians supported practices that hallowed the Lord's Day (Sunday), the Seventh-day Sabbatarians challenged the church's day of rest being on Sunday rather than Saturday. Some Dutch Anabaptists embraced Sabbatarianism and may have helped to introduce these practices into England. In England, Seventh-day Sabbatarianism is generally associated with John Traske (1585–1636), Theophilus Brabourne, and Dorothy Traske (c. 1585–1645), who also played a major role in keeping the early Traskite congregations growing in numbers.

Sunday Sabbatarianism became the normative view within the Church of England in one form or another. The Puritans were known to harbour First-day Sabbatarian views, which became well established in their successive Congregationalist Church, in addition to becoming entrenched in the Continental Reformed and Presbyterian churches, all of which belong to the Reformed tradition of Christianity. Additionally, the Moravian, Methodist, and Quaker denominations teach Sunday Sabbatarian views.

=== Seekers ===
The Seekers were not a distinct religion or sect but instead formed a loose religious society. Like other Protestant dissenting groups, they believed the Roman Catholic Church to be corrupt, which subsequently applied to the Church of England as well through its common heritage.

Seekers considered all churches and denominations to be in error and believed that only a new church established by Christ upon his return could possess his grace and power to change them within. Their anticipation of this event was found in their practices. For example, Seekers held quiet meetings as opposed to more programmed religious services and as such had no clergy or hierarchy. During these gatherings they would wait in silence and speak only when they felt that God had inspired them to do so. Seekers denied the effectiveness of external forms of religion such as the sacraments, water baptism and the Scriptures as a means of salvation. Many of them later became Quakers, convinced by the preaching of George Fox and other early Friends.

=== Socinians ===
The followers of Socinianism were Unitarian or Nontrinitarian in theology and influenced by the Polish Brethren. The Socinians of 17th century England influenced the development of the English Presbyterians, the English Unitarians and the Non-subscribing Presbyterian Church of Ireland.

== 18th & 19th centuries ==
=== Methodists ===
Methodism arose as a movement started by Anglican priest John Wesley, who taught two works of grace— (1) the New Birth and (2) entire sanctification. In the first work of grace, individuals repent of their sin and embrace Jesus as their saviour, accomplishing the acts of justification, regeneration, and adoption. In the second work of grace, which Wesley taught could be bestowed instantaneously, the believer is made perfect in love, original sin is uprooted, and he/she is empowered to serve God with an undivided heart. Wesley taught that those who receive the New Birth do not willfully sin. Additionally, he taught that the second blessing—entire sanctification—was "wrought instantaneously, though it may be approached by slow and gradual steps". Growth in grace occurs after the New Birth, as well as after Entire Sanctification. The early Methodists were known by careful lifestyle, including wearing of plain dress, fasting on Fridays, devout observance of the Lord's Day, and abstinence from alcohol. It originally operated within the Church of England (and several Methodist ministers, including Wesley's brother Charles Wesley, remained in that church after its schism) until complications tied to the American Revolution in the USA and John Wesley's death in Great Britain led to its schism in the 1780s and 1795 respectively.

=== Plymouth Brethren ===
The Plymouth Brethren originated in Dublin in 1827.

=== Rational Dissenters ===
In the 18th century, one group of Dissenters became known as "Rational Dissenters". In many respects they were closer to the Anglicanism of their day than other Dissenting sects; however, they believed that state religions impinged on the freedom of conscience. They were fiercely opposed to the hierarchical structure of the established church and the financial ties between it and the government. Like moderate Anglicans, they desired an educated ministry and an orderly church, but they based their opinions on the Bible and on reason rather than on appeals to tradition and authority. They rejected doctrines such as the original sin or Trinity, arguing that they were irrational. Rational Dissenters believed that Christianity and faith could be dissected and evaluated using the newly emerging discipline of science, and that a stronger belief in God would be the result.

=== Swedenborgians ===
A tradition that emerged at the end of the 18th century is the Swedenborgian church, which continues today in several branches around the world. It originated in London in 1780. Beginning as groups reading Emanuel Swedenborg, whose members were composed largely of Methodists, Baptists, and Anglicans, some of the Swedenborgian enthusiasts became disillusioned with the prospects for thorough Swedenborgian theological reform within their respective traditions. These left those churches to form the General Conference of the New Jerusalem, often called simply the New Church. Other Swedenborgian converts, such as Anglican John Clowes and Thomas Hartley, argued for remaining within existing traditions.

Swedenborg did not call for a new organisation but for profound theological reform for the existing churches. At the end of his life, he endured a rare Swedish heresy inquiry by the Swedish Lutheran Consistory. He died before it was concluded, and the Consistory shelved the inquiry without reaching a decision. Swedenborg's primary critiques of orthodox theology centred on the tri-personal constructions of the Trinity, the idea of salvation by faith alone, and the vicarious atonement. He revived an allegorical tradition of reading scripture, which he believed was composed in correspondences. He believed in a theory of symbolic values in the literal text, which could produce an inner sense wherein the individual could ascertain the new theology.

== Dissenting groups continuing today ==
- Anabaptists
- Baptists
- Congregationalists
- Methodists
- Nondenominational Protestants
- Plymouth Brethren
- Presbyterians (majority in Scotland but classified as dissenters in England, see English Presbyterianism)
- other Reformed groups: e.g. United Reformed Church
- Quakers
- Swedenborgians
- Unitarians and Unitarian Universalists

== See also ==
- 17th century denominations in England
- Christian anarchism
- Dissenting academies
- Ecclesiastical separatism
- English Independents
- Freedom of religion
- Global Fellowship of Confessing Anglicans
- History of the Puritans in North America
- Independent (religion)
- Nonconformist
- Recusancy
- Religion in the United Kingdom
- Separatists
