= John Blodwell =

English priest

John Blodwell, DCL was a 15th-century priest.

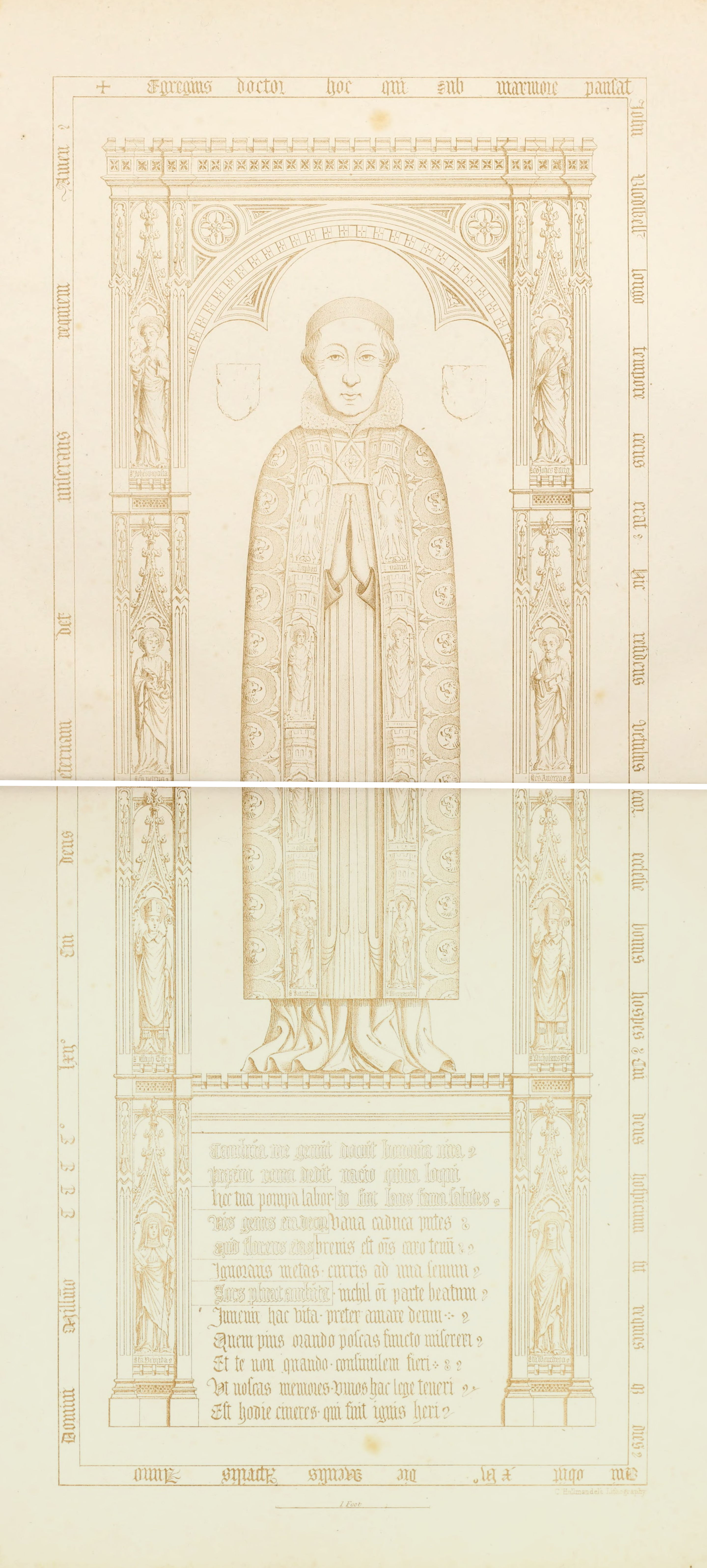
Memorial brass to John Blodwell in Balsham Church, 1462.

Blodwel was born in Llanyblodwel and educated at the University of Bologna. He held the living of Balsham in Cambridgeshire; was a Proctor of Durham and Canon of St Davids; and Dean of St Asaph from 1418 until 1441. He died at Balsham, Cambridgeshire, on 13 April 1462.
