= Mantegna (disambiguation) =

Mantegna is a surname. Notable people with the name include:

- Andrea Mantegna (c. 1431 – 1506), Italian painter
- Gia Mantegna (born 1990), American actress
- Joe Mantegna (born 1947), American actor

== See also ==
- Mantegna Tarocchi, two sets of 15th-century Italian cards with engravings
