= Justus Velsius =

Dutch humanist, physician, and mathematician

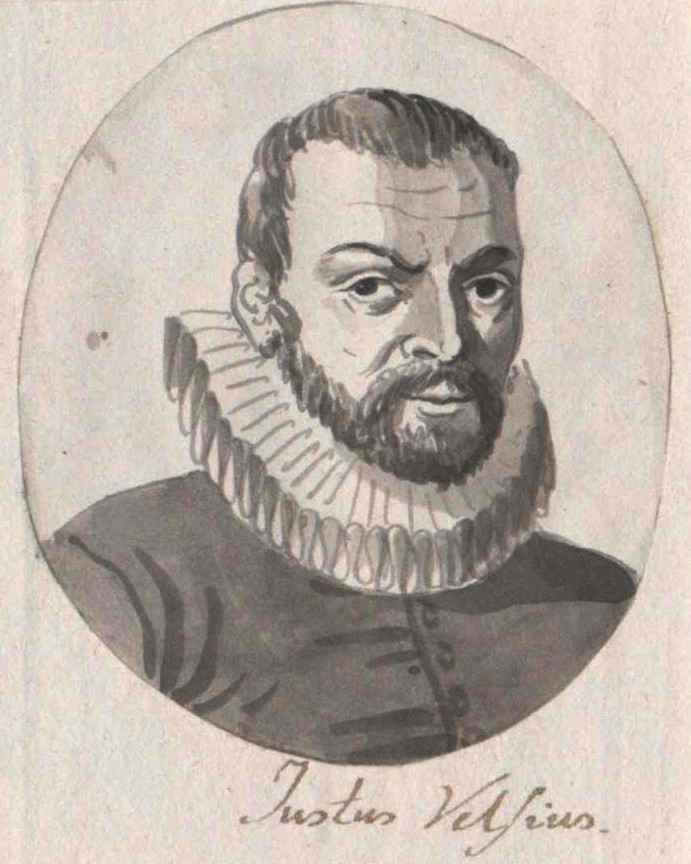
- Justus Velsius c. 1565
- Born: 1510; The Hague, Low Countries
- Died: 1581 (aged 70–71)
- Occupation: Humanist

Justus Velsius, Haganus, or Joost Welsens in Dutch (c. 1510, The Hague, Low Countries (Note: De Wal suggested that Velsius may have been from Heeg, Friesland instead.) – after 1581 at an unknown location), was a Dutch humanist, physician, and mathematician.

Velsius started his career as a highly respected professor of liberal arts in Leuven, Strasbourg, and Cologne. Later on he portrayed himself as a prophet, and promoted his own particular view of Christianity, outlined in a pamphlet "Christiani Hominis Norma" which he wrote in London. He came into conflict with civil and ecclesiastical authorities all over Europe, and spent his final years as a preacher and faith healer in his native Holland. While in Cologne Velsius was married to Beatrix van Steenhoven, and later on, in Groningen, to Grete Cassens.

== Life ==
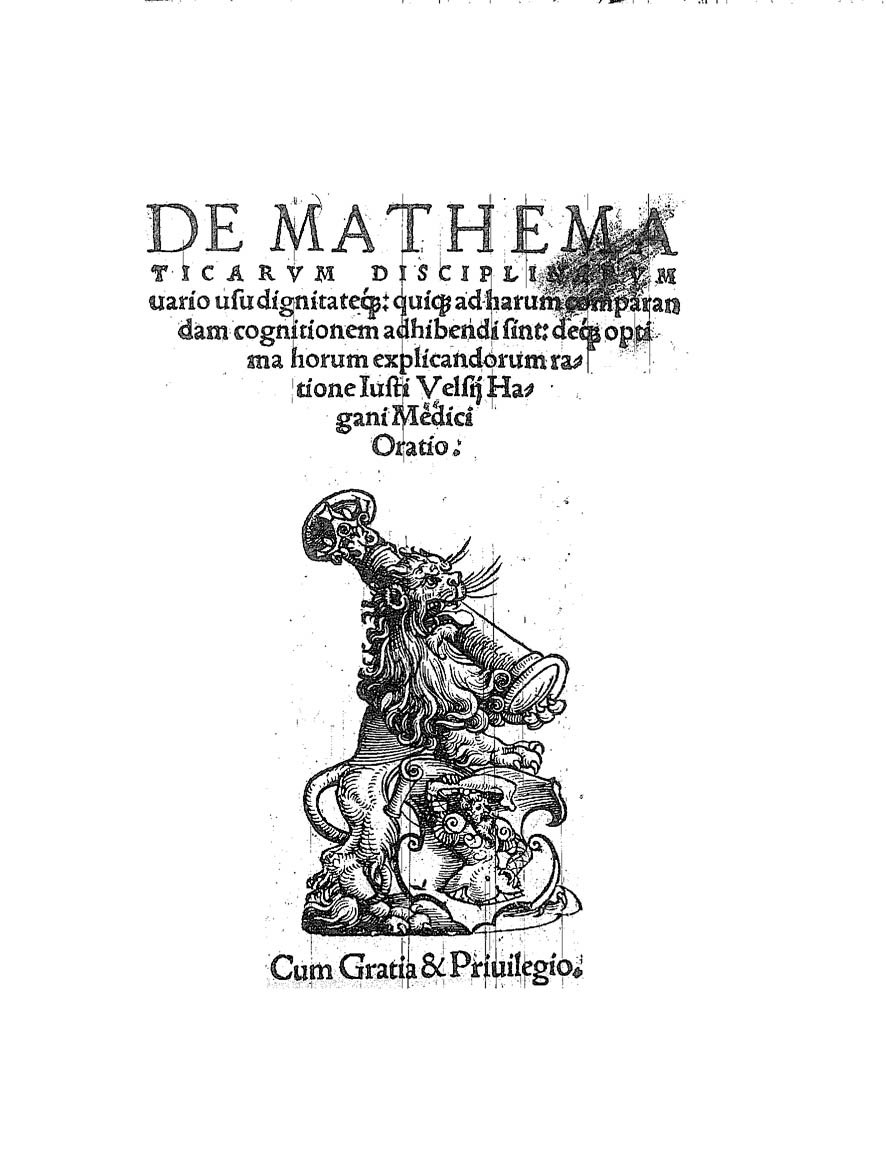
De mathematicarum disciplinarum vario usu dignitateque, 1544

After studying arts and medicine in Bologna, Velsius graduated as doctor medicinae in 1538 and settled down as physician in Antwerp, 1540/41. In 1541 he moved to Leuven, where he met Portuguese humanist Damião de Góis, and maintained friendly relations with Vesalius. Even though Velsius did not have a university position he held public lectures in Greek, Latin, philosophy and mathematics. In 1544 he proposed a course on Trebizond's Dialectica. The authorities balked, and in the ensuing controversy they forced Velsius, whose theological purity was suspect, out of the university. In 1542 he had failed in his bid to succeed Nannius, and he moved to Strasbourg in 1544 at the recommendation of Bucer, after a short teaching stint at the Marburg Latin School and possibly in Basel.

=== Strasbourg ===
From Easter 1544-50 Velsius taught dialectic and Aristotelian ethics in the higher grades of the gymnasium in Strasbourg, as a co-worker of Johannes Sturm. On 17 November 1545 he received a canonicate at St. Thomas collegiate church, through the mediation of Bucer. Sometime before 17 October 1548 he married Beatrix van Steenhoven. When Velsius got in trouble because he accepted the Interim and the resulting conflict with his Protestant colleagues, he moved to Cologne in the spring of 1550; he probably only gave up his Strasbourg canonicate in 1553.

=== Cologne: prosecuted by the Inquisition ===
Velsius matriculated at Cologne on 3 June 1550. The Council of Cologne wanted to build a Trilingual school following the example of the University of Leuven, and appointed Velsius professor of philosophy and Greek, in August 1550. Since Velsius was married, he could not obtain a university prebend, but was instead remunerated by the council. His compensation was increased in 1551 and 1552, and he was charged with teaching mathematics as well. Velsius and his colleague Jakob Leichius, who was instrumental in establishing the Gymnasium Tricoronatum, drafted guidelines for a curriculum of eight grades, similar to Sturm's humanistic curriculum in Strasbourg.

Velsius attended the meetings of the Anabaptists in the Bookbinder's Guildhall at the Pfaffengasse, where he met Anabaptist martyr Thomas von Imbroich. Velsius' philosophical writings, in particular the work of Krisis^{[works 11]} led to suspicion of heresy. On 29 October 1554 Krisis was condemned by Cologne University, and Velsius' teaching license revoked (11 December 1554, confirmed 29 March 1555), since he did not distance himself from his writing. Emperor Charles V, who had become involved at the instigation of the cathedral chapter, the clergy and the university, urged the council in vain to take action against Velsius, who on 25 March 1555 had published a defense, Epistola ad Ferdinandum.^{[works 14]} Only after Velsius attempted to give theological lectures at his home, and rejected the Eucharistic adoration and celibacy, did the magistrate banish him in April 1555.

Velsius refused to leave, and went voluntarily in detention, from December 1555 to the end of March 1556. He asked his influential friend Viglius to support him, but Viglius declined to get involved. Greatly offended by this refusal, Velsius apparently accused his friend of Protestant leanings, and severed all connections with his former friend. Because of this precedent the council adopted in 1555 a comprehensive directive against all heretics.

The Dominican Johannes Slotanus served as papal inquisitor for the ecclesiastical province of Mainz, Cologne and Trier against Velsius and three other imprisoned people, whom he described as Anabaptists. The Protestant Princes intervened at the council on his behalf, in particular Christoph von Oldenburg. Since in December 1555 he had declared to adhere to the Augsburg Confession, Velsius was protected by the recently concluded Peace of Augsburg. On the night of 26 to 27 March 1556 he was taken by boat across the river and put ashore on the other side, in the Duchy of Berg. From there he made it to Mülheim, where he wrote Apologia, addressed to the Emperor Charles and King Ferdinand.^{[works 15]} Slotanus replied in 1557 with the Apologia JV Hagani Confutatio. In response Velsius wrote in September 1557 the Epistolae.^{[works 16]} 1558 followed Slotanus' Disputationes adversus haereticos liber unus.

=== Frankfurt: disputation with Calvin ===
Velsius arrived in Frankfurt on 15 July 1556, approached Robert Horne, pastor of the English Church, and informed him of the revelations on which he wished to conduct a public dispute. Hearing of the arrival of Calvin, who came to arbitrate conflicts within the French Refugee Church, he offered the latter to preside. He proposed to defend the free will against the Calvinist doctrine of predestination. The debate with Calvin, Johannes à Lasco and Horne lasted two days; Velsius' argument boiled down to this: aut esse liberum arbitrium, aut Deum tyrannum esse (Either there is free will, or God is a tyrant).

In a letter addressed to Melanchthon, dated 17 September 1556, Calvin commented as follows:

I have been dragged hither by the dissensions with which Satan has rent, for nearly two years, the little French church established here, and reduced to such extremities that it must have disappeared, unless some remedy had been very promptly applied. Since I entered the town I have not had a moment's repose, and as if I had not had sufficient occupation in this affair, a madman called Velsius, to whom you had written twice, involved us in new fooleries. But we have devoted only two days to this importunity. I am continually distracted up to this moment, in appeasing those dissentions which, from the long lapse of time, have struck deep root.

On 15 April 1557 Velsius was expelled by the Council of Frankfurt.

=== Heidelberg: trouble with the Kurfürst ===
On 5 August 1557 Velsius matriculated at Heidelberg, and obtained a license to give public lectures in philosophy. In June 1558 this license was revoked by the Senate of the University at the orders of Kurfürst Ottheinrich because he spread theses that were against the Holy Scriptures. Velsius attacked the pastor of the Heiliggeistkirche, Johann Flinner, on his position on the Eucharist, sent him a series of theses on new birth and free will, and accused the pastor of being a false apostle and misleader of the prince and people. In November 1559 he was also disallowed to give private lectures, after intervention of Kurfürst Friedrich III, and was expelled by the Senate of the University. Velsius shook the dust off his shoes as he left.

In 1560 Velsius was back in Frankfurt. He asked the council for permission to have a book printed he had written die Summa christlicher Lehre und Lebens (The Summary of Christian Doctrine and Life). The council referred his request to the Lutheran pastors, who on 2 August 1560 reported back that his book contained theses that were against orthodox doctrine. They also expressed concern that these doctrines could lead to unrest in the foreign churches in the city, as had happened in Münster. On 18 March 1561 the council ordered Velsius to leave the city, since he had his book printed without permission. The innkeeper where he was boarding, Hansen Braun, was told to no longer allow him to stay in his house.

In May 1561 Velsius was in Strasbourg. He wrote to Flinner (who had returned from Heidelberg) and the preachers, and to the council as well, submitting 20 propositions, probably the same ones as he announced in Heidelberg and in Frankfurt. These were not accepted, since they disagreed with the catechism then in use in Strasbourg.

A month later, in June 1561, Velsius was in Basel. He was luckier there, at least he could count on Sebastian Castellio, with whom he had corresponded before, and advocates of tolerance such as Cellarius and Celio Secondo Curione. He submitted a summary to the Council of the University, who considered it on 16 June. The council forwarded it to the Faculty of Theology, since it was outside their area of expertise. Cellarius proposed a number of theses for an academic disputation, but Velsius declined after the council had refused a public debate.

On 25 June Velsius departed for Zürich, where he arrived the next day. He wrote to the council, and Bullinger responded on behalf of the council, pointing out that his criticism didn't apply since it was directed at Luther and at the Roman Catholic Church. On 4 July Velsius had left town.

On 1 August Velsius was back in Heidelberg, where he wrote a last time to Bonifacius Amerbach and to Johannes Sturm. He matriculated in Marburg at the end of August 1561, where he lectured at the medical school. However, he remained only a few months in Marburg.

=== London: more religious turmoil ===
In 1563, Velsius had crossed the Channel to England where he joined the Dutch Church in London. Again he sought controversy, this time with Nicolaus Carinaeus, the minister of the Dutch refugee church, who had died from the plague in September 1563. Carinaeus had explained his thoughts about regeneration through Christ. Velsius opposed him publicly developing at length his idea that the perfection of Adam could be reached on earth after inner rebirth had taken place in the individual. Velsius wrote a summary of his religion Christiani Hominis Norma (The Rule of a Christian Man), in which he explained his notion that through regeneration man could become God-in-man, like Christ. He sent copies of this pamphlet to the Bishop of London Edmund Grindal, to Secretary of State William Cecil, and to Queen Elizabeth.

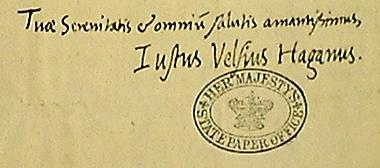
Justus Velsius' signature on his letter to Queen Elizabeth

He also wrote a letter to the French Ambassador denouncing the vengeance of God on all who refused to receive his propositions. In his letter to the Queen, Velsius claimed to have confirmed his calling by performing miracles. The servant to the ambassador, Cosmus, fasted five or six days by Velsius' persuasion that after his abstinence he might receive illuminations a cœlo. According to Grindal in the end he fell mad, so neither of those miracles stood the test of further investigation. Bishop Grindal wrote a rebuttal, showing that Velsius' teachings were against orthodox doctrine. Velsius was summoned before the ecclesiastical commission, consisting of Bishop Grindal, the Bishop of Winchester Robert Horne, and the Dean of St. Paul's Alexander Nowell, who had a frank discussion with him, and charged him in the Queen's name to leave the kingdom. This he complained of in very rude words to the Queen, and predicted the death of the bishop of Winchester and other important public figures. (Note: Velsius' Christiani Hominis Norma, and his letters to Grindal, Queen Elizabeth, the French Ambassador, Cecil, and related papers from Grindal have been placed online on the website of the University of Hull, Volume 28 March–May 1563. Included is a letter to Calvin with propositions contrary to Calvin's doctrines, with Horne's response; these may be the theses used at the Frankfurt disputation. For transcripts of Grindal's paper, and Velsius' Norma, see here, here, and here.)

=== Groningen: imprisonment ===
Velsius returned to his native Holland, in April 1566 he was Groningen. In 1574 he was in prison there, presumably because of religious reasons. The authorities felt sorry for him, because he was an elderly gentleman, and apparently depressed. They therefore proposed to release him, also because of the hardship imprisonment caused him and his wife Grete Cassens, as they had to provide for his own cost of living. The proposal was considered by the Stadtholder de Robles, who had a conversation with Velsius, and referred it to the bishop, who charged the dean of the cathedral to look into it. On 24 August 1574 the bishop endorsed Velsius' release. However, Velsius refused to leave prison, because he only wanted to be released by God's grace, not by human intervention. This unusual situation lasted until May 1575, when de Robles required the jail to be vacated, since the adjacent castle had to be strengthened and readied for the garrison.

=== Holland: faith healer ===
In April 1570 he was again in Cologne and then traveled through the Netherlands as a Protestant preacher. In 1578, 1580 and 1581, he was in Leiden.

== Work ==
Velsius published the Greek text of Proclus's De Motu (On Motion), along with a Latin translation.^{[works 5]}

== Theology ==
Justus Velsius is interesting because his life reflects so well the unsettled intellectual conditions of 16th-century Europe. His theological profile in the religious landscape is not clearly defined: first, he did not agree with Luther's dogma of "sola fide" and instead held on to the free will of man; on the other hand, he supported the Lutheran Eucharist and rejected transubstantiation. Also, Velsius cannot be identified as Anabaptist, and is distinct from Spiritualism. What sets Velsius apart is that he taught justification by new birth, not by forgiveness of sins. He thought of himself as a messenger of God, sent to warn people for eternal damnation, and claimed to be able to confirm his teachings by miracles.

It has been suggested that Velsius may have known Servetus, since both were close to Vesalius. Velsius' position about predestination is reminiscent of Servetus', and it is noteworthy that the Calvin-Velsius disputation on this subject took place less than three years after Servetus was executed outside Geneva. Rembert suggests that Velsius may have known Flemish Anabaptist religious reformer Johann Campanus, or at the very least that they were aware of each other's work.

Velsius' teachings appear to be related to those of the Family of Love. Velsius was a contemporary of Hendrik Niclaes, the founder of the Family of Love, and it seems likely that they may have known each other.

== Selected works ==
1. Hippocratis Coi De insomniis liber. Antwerp: Matthaei Crommij (1541). 1541. OCLC 560648916.
2. Ciceronis Academicarvm Qvaestionvm Liber Primvs. Leuven: Servatius Zassenus (1542). OCLC 615546903.
3. Vtrvm In Medico Varia-rvm Artivm Ac Scien-tiarum cognitio requiratur. Basel: Johann Oporin (1543). OCLC 249273879.
4. De mathematicarum disciplinarum vario usu oratio. Strasbourg: Cratonus Mylius (1544). 1544. OCLC 165927235.
5. Procli de motu Libri II. Basel: Joannes Hervagius (1545). 1545. OCLC 165353999.
6. In Cebetis Thebani Tabvlam Commentariorvm Libri Sex. Lyon: (1551). 1551. OCLC 162385406.
7. Simplicii omnium Aristotelis interpretum praestantissimi. Basel: Michael Isingrinius (1551). 1551. OCLC 504390751.
8. In Aristotelis de virtutibus librum Commentarium libri III. Cologne: Martinus Gymnicus (1551). 1551. OCLC 165670768.
9. De artium liberalium et Philosophiae Praecepta tradendi recta ratione. Cologne: Arnold Birkmann (1554). 1554. OCLC 165927237.
10. Probabiliter disserendi ratio et via quae in Aristotelis Topicis traditur. Cologne: Arnold Birkmann (1554). 1554. OCLC 458457289.
11. Κρισις: Verae Christianaeqve Philosophiae comprobatoris. Cologne: Jacob Soter (1554). OCLC 311930648.
12. Beschreibung Vrtheil des zumollobenden bewehrers vnd nachfolgers der waren Christlichen weyssheit. (1554). OCLC 254204811.
13. De humanae vitae recta ratione ac via, seu de hominis Beatitudinibus. Basel: Johann Oporin (1554). 1554. OCLC 311881180.
14. Epistola ad Ferdinandum Romanorum Regem. Basel: Johann Oporin (1555). 1555. OCLC 504756608.
15. Apologia Iusti Velsii Hagani, contra haereticae pravitatis appellatos Inquisitores. Frankfurt: Christian Egenolff (1556). 1556. OCLC 67051278.
16. Epistolae, aliaque quaedam scripta et vocationis suae rationem et totius Coloniensis negotii summam complectentia ( - Brevis verae christianaeque philosophiae descriptio). Basel: Johann Oporin (1557). 1557. OCLC 458457259.
17. Tabula totius philosophiae moralis thesaurum complectens. Paris: Andreas Wechel (1557). OCLC 457368255.
