= West Wratting Park =

English country home in Cambridgeshire

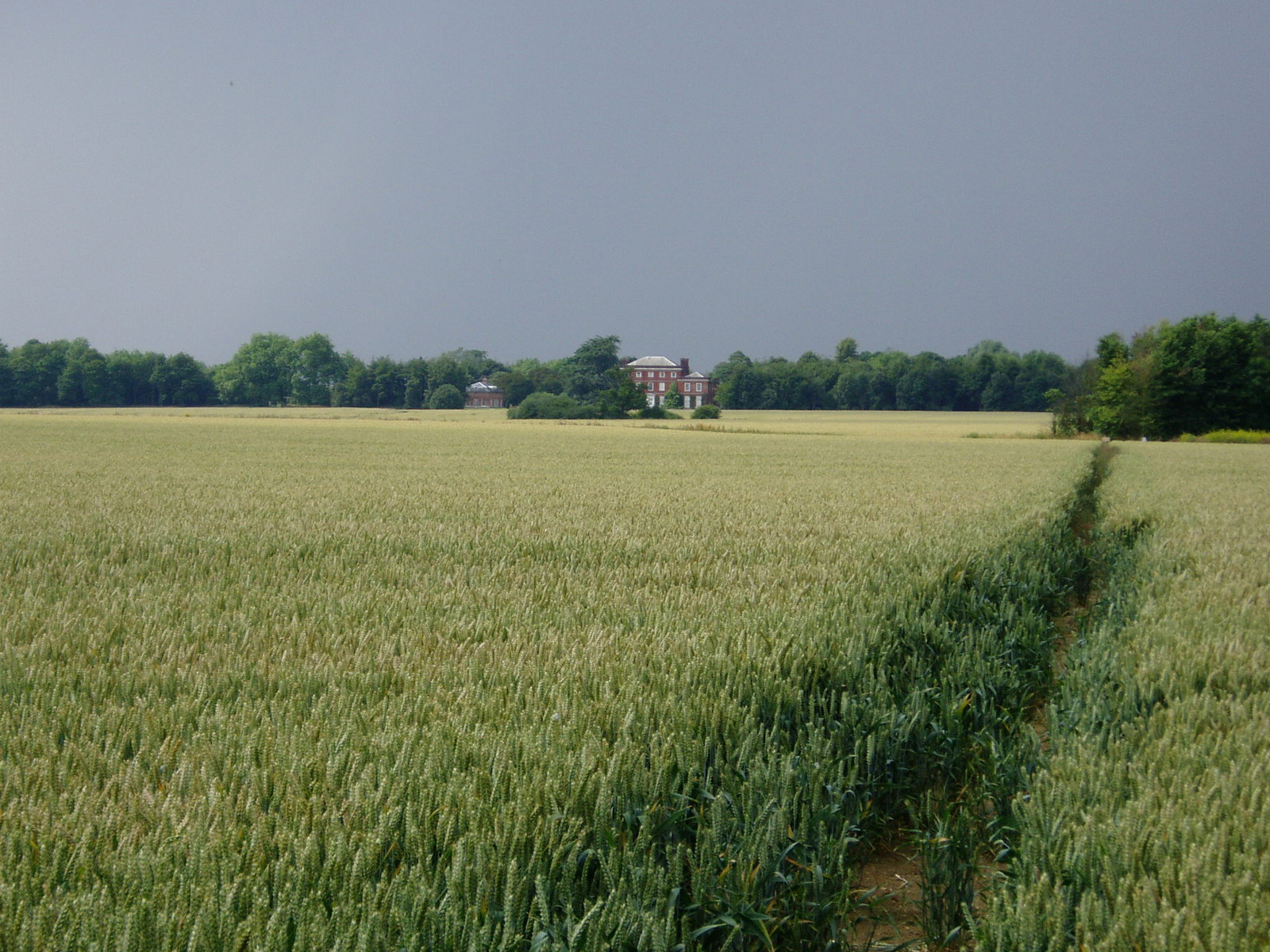
- West Wratting Park in 2005
- Interactive map of West Wratting Park
- Type: Private residence
- Location: West Wratting, Cambridgeshire, England

History
- Built: c. 1730

Site notes
- Architectural style: Georgian
- Owner: Sir John Jacob, 3rd Bt. (former) d'Abo family (former)

West Wratting Park is an English country house and Grade II* listed building in the village of West Wratting in Cambridgeshire, England.

== History ==
From 1571 when it was sold to Dr. Andrew Perne, Dean of Ely and Master of Peterhouse, Cambridge the manor of West Wratting was the property of Peterhouse. The lease of the manor was purchased by Sir John Jacob, 3rd Baronet who built the house at West Wratting Park in about 1730. The mansion was remodeled and extended in the late 18th century, including a garden wall and a stable block. The mansion and stables are listed buildings. The grounds include a drive, an 120-acre park, tennis courts, and a walk. The house later passed to Harry Frost whose family also held Oxcroft House and West Wratting Hall, meaning they held almost all the land in the parish. In 1867, West Wratting Park was held by Harry Frost's nephew W. T. Frost, whose estate went to his nephews Edward Purkis Frost and H. Frost. Around 1909, E. P. Frost bought the freehold from Peterhouse. In 1935 the house and about 120 acres were offered for sale by E. P. Frost's nephew and heir, E. G. G. Frost.

The mansion was used as a preparatory school, at which time a cricket field and nine-hole golf course were added, mentioned in the 1935 sale of the house.

In the 1950s, the estate became the home of the financier Erland d'Abo and his wife, the socialite Lady Ursula d'Abo.
