= Henry Nicholas (disambiguation) =

Henry Nicholas may refer to:

- Henry Nicholas (born 1959), American businessman
- Henry James Nicholas, VC recipient
- Henry Nicholis (Hendrik Nicholis, Hendrik Niclaes or Heinrich Niclaes), 16th century Christian mystic

== See also ==
- Harry Nicholas, trade unionist
