= West Wratting =

Village in Cambridgeshire, England

Coordinates: 52.146°N 0.346°E

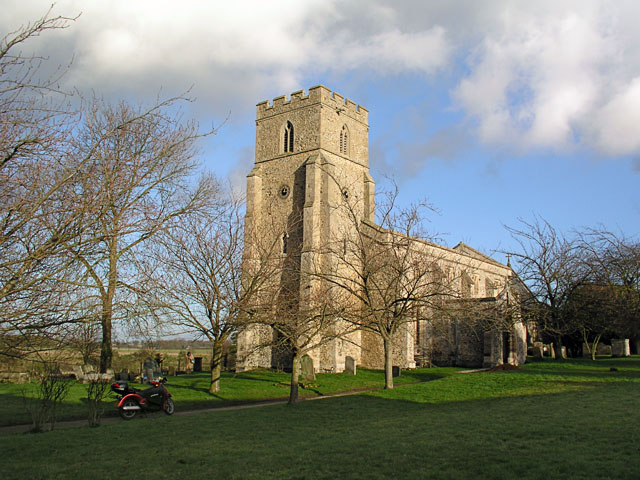
- St Andrew's Church

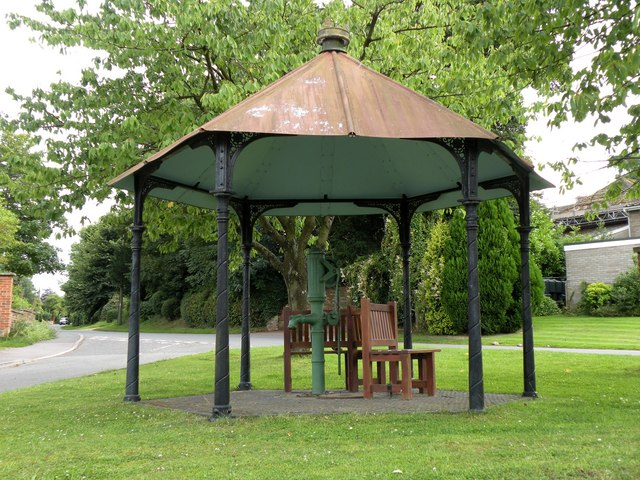
- The village pump at West Wratting

- Location within Cambridgeshire
- Population: 436 (2001); 502 (2011)
- OS grid reference: TL605515
- District: South Cambridgeshire
- Shire county: Cambridgeshire
- Region: East
- Country: England
- Sovereign state: United Kingdom
- Post town: CAMBRIDGE
- Postcode district: CB21
- Dialling code: 01223
- UK Parliament: South East Cambridgeshire

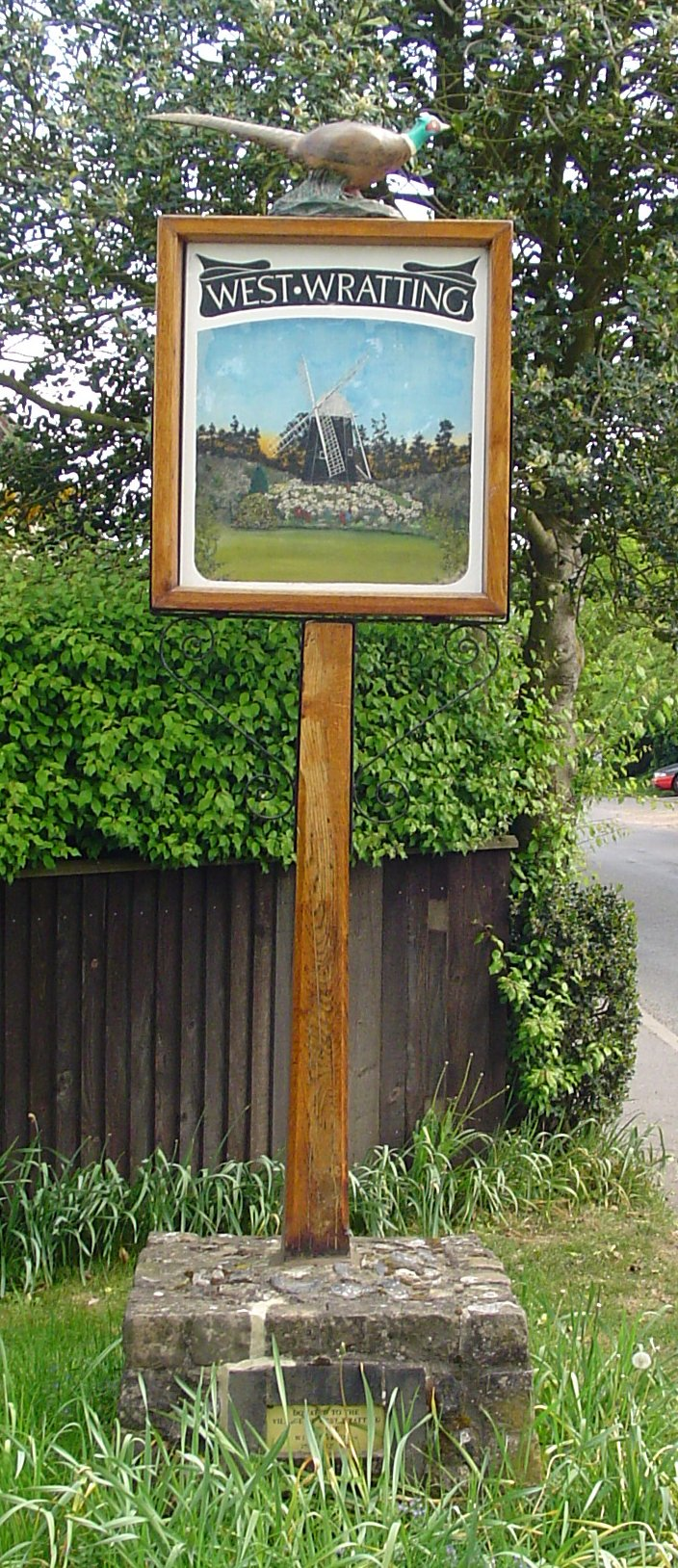
Signpost in West Wratting, which was knocked over in 2013.

West Wratting is a village and civil parish 10 miles southeast of Cambridge in Cambridgeshire, England. At 390 feet (120 m) above sea level, it can claim to be one of the highest villages in Cambridgeshire.

The parish covers 3,543 acres in south east Cambridge, a thin strip, less than two miles wide, stretching from the London to Newmarket road to the border with Suffolk. Much of its western border follows the Fleam Dyke. It is bordered by Weston Colville to the north and east, and by Balsham and West Wickham to the south.

== History ==
The parish is believed to have been formed as an offshoot of Great Wratting in Suffolk. Land at the village is recorded in the Domesday Book (1086) as belonging to one Harduin de Scalers. The same family owned the land until it was granted by Stephen de Scalariis and his wife, Juliana, to the Nunnery of St Mary and St Radegund, Cambridge, on the placement there of their daughter Sibil before 1161. It houses a smock mill dated to 1726, the oldest confirmed in the country.

Two 18th-century manor houses, West Wratting Hall and West Wratting Park, remain standing. West Wratting Hall was home to E.P. Frost who built an unsuccessful flapping-wing flying machine ("ornithopter"), powered by steam. Frost was president of the Aeronautical Society from 1908 to 1911, and a later version of his machine can be seen in the Shuttleworth Collection. West Wratting Park was home to Lady Ursula d'Abo in her later life.

Towards the end of World War II an airfield was set up outside the village at RAF Wratting Common, and part of No. 195 Squadron RAF was posted there equipped with Avro Lancasters. After the war in the late 1940s, the station was used to host foreign displaced persons and workers in the Westward Ho! and North Sea scheme work programmes.

According to Ordnance Survey, West Wratting is the second highest village in Cambridgeshire (390 feet, 120 m above sea level) after Great Chishill (479 ft. 146 m above sea level).

Listed as Wreattinge in the 10th century and Waratinge in the Domesday Book, the village's name means "place where crosswort or hellebore grows".

The area between West Wratting and Balsham is said to be the haunt of the mythical Shug Monkey.

== Church ==
The village had a church from at least the early 12th century. The present parish church, dedicated to St Andrew since the 16th century, includes elements dating back to the 13th century. The present building consists of a chancel with north vestry, clerestoried nave with south porch, and west tower. The chancel arch dates from the 13th century, and the tower from the 14th, though foundations of a small tower predating the 13th century have been found.

The church has a band of bell ringers who meet for practice on Thursday evening and ring for services on Sunday.

A nonconformist chapel was built in around 1815, but numbers declined in the 1960s to the point of dereliction.

== Village life ==
Today the village houses one pub, the Chestnut Tree, which opened in the late 19th century. There were three alehouses licensed in the village in 1632. The Crown Inn, opposite the church, recorded from 1788, was renamed The Lamb in the 20th century but closed at some point after 1975.

A National day school was opened in 1861 but had completely disbanded by 1971.

According to Ordnance Survey, West Wratting is the second highest village in Cambridgeshire (390 feet, 120 m above sea level) after Great Chishill (479 ft. 146 m above sea level).

== Politics ==
West Wratting and the surrounding area is part of the South Cambridgeshire for UK general elections. Previously a safe seat for the Conservative Party, the seat is currently held by Pippa Heylings with a 10,000 majority, representing the Liberal Democrats, following the 2024 General Election.
