= Christopher Vitell =

Dutch carpenter or joiner and Familist preacher

Christopher Vitell (or Viret) (fl. 1543–1579), a Dutch carpenter or joiner from Southwark, was the first Familist preacher in England, though he subsequently recanted his belief when faced with death by burning. Vitell appears to have developed his Anabaptist beliefs from the Dutchman Henry Nicholis.

== Life ==
A native of Delft, settled in England some time before the middle of the sixteenth century. He changed views in religion, professing Arianism under Queen Mary, and being imprisoned in Wood Street, London, until on Elizabeth's succession he recanted his errors before Edmund Grindal at St. Paul's Cross. Eventually, however, Vitell became a convert to the teaching of Nicholis (Henrik Niclaes), the founder of the Familists or ‘Family of Love.’

He wandered up and down in East Anglia spreading mystical doctrines, and found a hearing at Cambridge, Willingham and Balsham in Cambridgeshire, Strethall in Essex, at Colchester (where he was living at Michaelmas 1555), and other places. He became a chief elder in the family, and translated into English the writings of Niclaes, and one or two by Elidad and Fidelitas, his seniors. The result of Vitell's translation was a proclamation issued in 1580 by Archbishop Grindal against the ‘family’ and all their writings.

There is no authentic record of his later life.

== Works ==
Eight of the treatises—‘The Prophetie of the Spirit of Love,’ ‘A Publishing of the Peace upon Earth,’ ‘A joyful Message of the Kingdom,’ ‘Proverbs,’ ‘Documentall Sentences,’ ‘Correction and Exhortation out of Heartie Loue,’ ‘A good and fruitfull Exhortation,’ ‘A Distinct Declaration’—were printed abroad in 1574 and covertly introduced into England. They occasioned the attack of John Rogers, ‘The Displaying of an Horrible Sect,’ 1578, to which Vitell replied in a work not extant, entitled ‘Testimonies of Sion of the great Stone of Foundation layd therein of Judgement and Righteousness and of holy Priesthood, and spiritual Oblation through Jesus Christ brought forth through the Lord's elected minister Henry Nicholas.’ This was reprinted and answered, paragraph by paragraph, by Rogers in his ‘Answere vnto a wicked and infamous Libel made by Christopher Vitels, one of the chiefe English Elders of the pretended Family of Loue’ [1578]; another ed. 1579.
