= John Slotanus =

Dutch Roman Catholic polemical writer

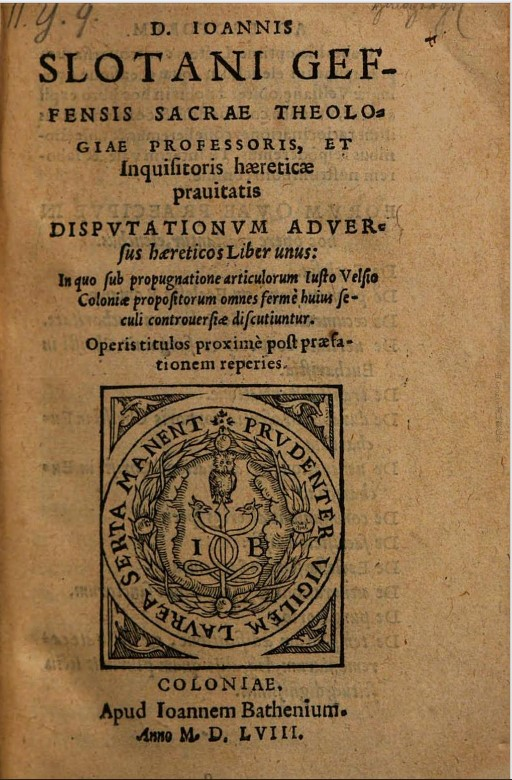
Title page of the Disputationum adversus haereticos liber unus, published by Johan Baethen in Cologne in 1558

John Slotanus (also Schlottanus or van der Slootien, John Geffen) (died July 9, 1560) was a Dutch Roman Catholic polemical writer. He lived and worked most of his life in Cologne.

== Life ==
Slotanus was born in Geffen, Brabant. He joined the Dominican Order at Cologne about 1525. For many years he worked to defend Roman Catholicism against its opponents through preaching and writing. Later he taught sacred literature at Cologne.

In 1554 was made a Doctor of Theology. About this same time he became prior of his convent at Cologne. In this role he exercised the offices of censor of the faith and papal inquisitor throughout the Archdiocese of Cologne and the Rhine country. In the discharge of these duties Slotanus came into conflict with the learned Justus Velsius, who in 1556, on account of teachings deemed heretical by the Church, was obliged to leave Cologne. The vehement writings which Velsius afterwards published against the Cologne theologians moved Slotanus to write two works covering nearly all the heretical doctrines of his time.

He died in Cologne.

== Works ==
Among Slotanus's various works those most worthy of mention are: Disputationum adversus hæreticos liber unus (Cologne, 1558); De retinenda fide orthodoxa et catholica adversus hæreses et sectas (Cologne, 1560); and De barbaris nationibus convertendis ad Christum (Cologne, 1559). In the last-named work Slotanus displays the ardent missionary zeal which fired the religious men of his time.
