= Shaking the dust from the feet =

Practice in ancient Judaism

Shaking the dust from the feet was a practice of pious Jews during New Testament times. When Jesus called his twelve disciples, he told them to perform the same act against the non-believing Jews.

In the early Latter Day Saint movement of the 19th century, it was practiced much as recorded in the New Testament, but later fell out of use. Other Christian groups and organizations typically do not see this as a practice that should be followed, or they see it as something not to be taken literally.

== New Testament ==
In Biblical times, when leaving Gentile cities, pious Jews often shook the dust from their feet to show their separation from Gentile practices.If the disciples shook the dust of a Jewish town from their feet, it would show their separation from Jews who rejected their Messiah. The gesture was to show the people that they were making a wrong choice; the opportunity to choose Christ might not present itself again. According to the New Testament, when Jesus called his twelve disciples, he sent them into Jewish lands and told them, in a reversal, to perform the same act against the non-believing Jews (Matthew 10:14), and "it shall be more tolerable for the land of Sodom and Gomorrha in the day of judgment, than for that city" (Matthew 10:15). The only recorded instance of this practice in the New Testament was when Paul the Apostle and Barnabas were expelled from Antioch, Pisidia by Jews who disapproved of them teaching to Gentiles (Acts 13:50–51).

== Latter Day Saint movement ==
=== Reintroduction ===
In July 1830, Joseph Smith, founder of the Latter Day Saint movement, dictated his first revelation referencing the practice, said to be the words of Jesus directed to Smith and Oliver Cowdery, directing them as follows:

And in whatsoever place ye shall enter, and they receive you not, in my name ye shall leave a cursing instead of a blessing, by casting off the dust of your feet against them as a testimony, and cleansing your feet by the wayside.

In 1831, a revelation clarified that when leaving a cursing upon a person in this way, the shaking of dust and washing of feet should be performed "not in their presence, lest thou provoke them, but in secret."

On January 25, 1832, one of Smith's revelations directed several missionaries to use the practice, and indicated that when performed against a house, the missionaries:

shall be filled with joy and gladness and know this, that in the day of judgment you shall be judges of that house, and condemn them, and it shall be more tolerable for the heathen in the day of judgment, than for that house.

After referring again to the practice in an August 29, 1832, revelation, Smith gave his final revelation on the subject on September 22–23, 1832. This revelation, directed to those ordained to the newly established high priesthood, indicated that when a person does not receive a traveling high priest, or give them food, clothing, or money, they should

go away from him alone by yourselves, and cleanse your feet, even with water, pure water, whether in heat or in cold, and bear testimony of it unto your Father, and return not again unto that man. And in whatsoever village or city ye enter, do likewise.

=== Early practice ===
The first recorded practice of shaking the dust from the feet was by Smith's brother Samuel H. Smith, who performed the act on June 30, 1830, a few days or weeks before Smith's first revelation on the subject. After Smith's revelations, the practice became fairly common. Below is a table with some of the known instances of Latter Day Saint missionaries shaking the dust off their feet during Smith's lifetime:

Date	Occurrence
June 30, 1830	Samuel H. Smith washed his feet against an innkeeper who refused to board him after he mentioned the Book of Mormon, while proselytizing in Livonia, New York.
June 16, 1831	Early missionaries Hyrum Smith, Lyman Wight, John Corrill, and John Murdock washed their feet against Detroit, Michigan, after a day of unsuccessful proselytizing.
September 9, 1831	Hyrum Smith washed his feet against an angry Christian minister.
November 18, 1831	William E. McLellin and Samuel H. Smith washed their feet against a Campbellite congregation, after they had given them time during a meeting but rejected their testimony.
February 16, 1832	William McLellin and Luke S. Johnson wash their feet against Hubbard, Ohio.
March 1, 16, 18, and June 1, 1832	Act performed by Samuel H. Smith against those who did not accept his message.
March, September 16, October 23, 1832	Orson Hyde routinely either blessed houses or shook the dust off his feet to "seal" them up to the "day of wrath". On September 16, after a tearful meeting with his sister and brother-in-law, he reluctantly shook the dust against them.
February 18, 1833	Orson Pratt washed his hands and feet as a testimony against the current "wicked generation", as a requirement for admission to the School of the Prophets.
May 7, June 7, 1835	William McLellin shook the dust against Sinclairville, New York, after only one old lady attended a scheduled meeting at the local schoolhouse, which was locked. McLellin and David W. Patten shook the dust against Wolcott, New York, when they passed the plate after a two-hour sermon to nonbelievers but received no donations.
July 11, 1835	William McLellin, Brigham Young, and Thomas B. Marsh shook the dust against an innkeeper who gave them bread and milk for breakfast, but became abusive after they bore their testimonies to him.
May 22, 1836	Wilford Woodruff, David Patten, and Benjamin Boydstun washed their hands and feet against people who threatened them and rejected their testimony. They "delivered them unto the hands of God and the destroyer".
May 24, 1836, July 11, 1837, September 30, 1837	Wilford Woodruff and other missionaries wash their feet against various Christian ministers in New England who reject their message, and against the town of Collinsville, Connecticut.

=== In The Church of Jesus Christ of Latter-day Saints ===
The Church of Jesus Christ of Latter-day Saints (LDS Church) continued the practice of shaking the dust off feet throughout the 19th century. Most notably, it was performed on January 19, 1881, by the First Presidency and Quorum of the Twelve Apostles against a list of 400 people considered "Enemies of the Kingdom of God" because of their activism against Mormon polygamy. In 1899, however, the First Presidency issued a direction to mission presidents to stop using it as a routine practice, but only where there is just cause and when moved by the Holy Spirit.

In 1915, the influential apostle James E. Talmage provided his opinion that the practice should occur only in "unusual and extreme conditions":

To ceremonially shake the dust from one's feet as a testimony against another was understood by the Jews to symbolize a cessation of fellowship and a renunciation of all responsibility for consequences that might follow. It became an ordinance of accusation and testimony by the Lord's instructions to His apostles as cited in the text [of the New Testament]. In the current dispensation, the Lord has similarly directed His authorized servants to so testify against those who wilfully and maliciously oppose the truth when authoritatively presented (see Doctrine and Covenants 24:15; 60:15; 75:20; 84:92; 99:4). The responsibility of testifying before the Lord by this accusing symbol is so great that the means may be employed only under unusual and extreme conditions, as the Spirit of the Lord may direct.

Since the early-20th century, the practice has been rare. Nevertheless, there have been further doctrinal developments by LDS Church leaders and scholars. According to J. Reuben Clark, a mid-century member of the First Presidency, the ritual of shaking the dust off one's feet is a manifestation of a priesthood holder's "power to determine whether sins should be forgiven, or retained"

== Other Christians ==
Other Christian groups and individuals have taken the concept of shaking the dust from the feet as a practice to be followed. Others feel the message was only for New Testament people, and should not be practiced literally.

The 16th-century prophet Justus Velsius practiced the ritual when he was expelled from Heidelberg at the orders of Kurfürst Friedrich III.

In a rebuke for claims that Christians have persecuted the Jews, Martin Luther said "let us follow the advice of Christ and shake the dust from our shoes, and say, 'We are innocent of your blood.'"

== See also ==
- Foot washing
- Ritual purification
