= Familia Caritatis =

Sixteenth-century religious sect

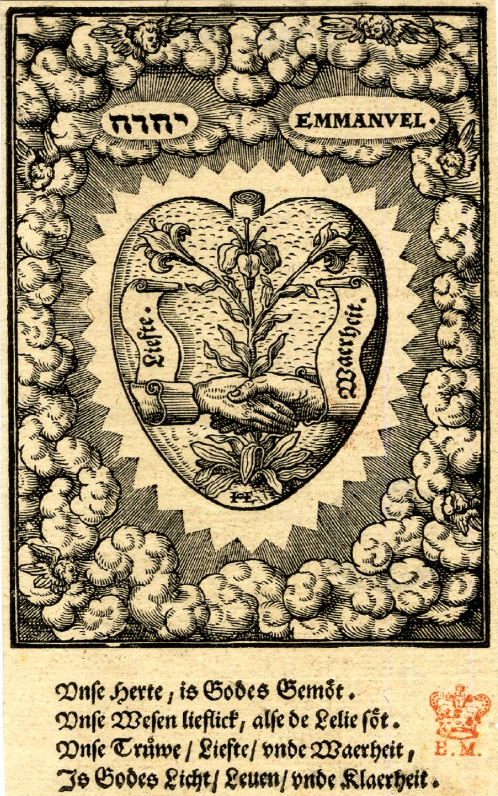
Engraving by Johann Ladenspelder which is linked to Correction and exhortation out of heartie loue, a book by Nicholis

The Familia Caritatis, Latin for "Family of Love", also known as the Familists, was a mystical religious sect founded in the sixteenth century by Henry Nicholis, also known as Niclaes. Familia Caritatis translates to "Hus der Lieften" in Low German, "Huis der Liefde" in Dutch, and "Haus der Liebe" in German. The group was based in Westphalia (Germany), the Netherlands and England.

== History ==
In 1540, Henry Nicholis announced that he had received a divine vision where he was told to become a prophet and founder of a new sect to be called ‘Familia Caritatis’ (‘Huis der Liefde’ or ‘Family of Love’).

The outward trappings of Nicholis's system were Anabaptist, although they accepted the practice of infant baptism. His followers were said to assert that all things were ruled by nature and not directly by God, deny the Christian doctrine of the Trinity, and repudiate infant baptism. They held that no person should be put to death for their opinions, and, like the later Quakers, they objected to carrying arms and anything like an oath. They were quite impartial in their repudiation of all other churches and sects, including Brownists and Barrowists. The main feature of the group was emphasis on mystic contemplation, and the belief that, through love, man could become absolutely absorbed in, and identified with, God. They also believed that the divine spirit of love within them elevated them above the constraints of religious creeds, liturgy, and law. They were accused of denying the divinity of Christ.

Nicholis's message is said to have appealed to the well-educated and creative elite, artists, musicians, and scholars. They felt no need to spread the message and risk prosecution for heresy. Members were usually a part of an otherwise-established church, both Protestant and Catholic. They remained quietly in the background, and were confident in their elite status as part of the Godhead. The Encyclopædia Britannica Eleventh Edition states:

Nicholis's followers escaped the gallows and the stake, for they combined with some success the wisdom of the serpent and the harmlessness of the dove. They would only discuss their doctrines with sympathizers; they showed every respect for authority, and considered outward conformity a duty. This quietist attitude, while it saved them from molestation, hampered propaganda.

Members of the Familists included the cartographer Abraham Ortelius and the publisher Christopher Plantin. Plantin worked during the day as Philip II of Spain's printer of Catholic documents for the Counter-Reformation and otherwise surreptitiously printed Familist literature.

Nicholis's chief apostle in England was Christopher Vitell, who led the largest group of Familists in Balsham, Cambridgeshire. He also translated Nicholis’ writings into English.

In 1580 Queen Elizabeth directed an inquiry to be made into their practices and their books were ordered to be burnt. In October 1580 Roger Goad and William Fulke took part in the examination of John Bourne, a glover, and some others of the Family of Love who were confined in Wisbech Castle, on the Isle of Ely. In the 1580s, it was discovered that some of the Yeomen of the Guard for Elizabeth I were Familists. The Queen did nothing about it, raising questions about her beliefs. The keeper of the lions in the Tower of London for James VI and I was also a Familist.

By the early 1600’s their numbers were diminishing. The society lingered into the early years of the eighteenth century. The leading idea of its service of love was relying on sympathy and tenderness for its members' moral and spiritual edification. Thus, in an age of strife and polemics, it seemed to afford a refuge for quiet, gentle spirits and meditative temperaments. The Quakers, Baptists and Unitarians may have derived some of their ideas from the "Family".
