= Edward Purkis Frost =

English aviation pioneer

Edward Purkis Frost JP DL
- Edward Purkis Frost
- Born: 1842; West Wratting, Cambridgeshire, England, United Kingdom
- Died: 1922 (aged 79–80); West Wratting, Cambridgeshire, England, United Kingdom
- Employer: Aeronautical Society
- Known for: Aeronautic experiments

Edward Purkis Frost (1842 – 1922) was an English pioneer of aviation. He built ornithopters, and was president of the Aeronautical Society from 1908 until 1911.

Purkis Frost was born in 1842, the son of Edward Frost Esq JP of West Wratting Hall and Sarah Purkis daughter of William Purkis Esq of Oxcroft House. Both families had been significant landowners in the area for some time. His brother was Colonel Harry Frost Esq JP DL of Oxcroft House, commanding officer of the 4th Battalion of the Suffolk Regiment who had inherited Oxcroft following its sale by his grandfather William Purkis to his father Edward Frost.

E.P. Frost lived at West Wratting Hall in Cambridgeshire and became a Justice of the Peace and a Deputy Lieutenant for Cambridgeshire. The park to the east of the hall was often used by Purkis Frost to test his flying machines.

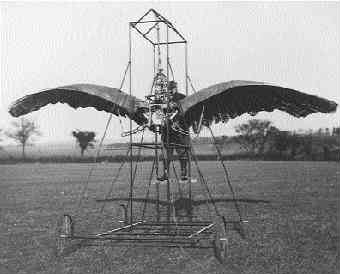
Frost's 1902 ornithopter

Frost began studying flight in 1868 and built a large steam-powered flying machine with both fixed and flapping wings from 1870 to 1877. Frost had intended to have a 20-25 hp steam engine but the actual engine with 5 hp was not powerful enough to lift the ornithopter from the ground. The experiment cost Frost £1000. In collaboration with several colleagues he started another large similar craft in 1902 with an internal combustion engine. Sources are conflicted about the success of this aircraft. One source alleges that it lifted from the ground in 1904. Another, however directly contradicts this assertion, claiming that it was suspended from a tree and could be observed to rise slightly on every downbeat of the wings. A wing from this craft is displayed in London's Science Museum.

Frost had been a member of the Aeronautical Society since 1875 and became its president from 1908 to 1911. Purkis Frost was nominated for the Nobel Peace Prize in 1909 by Percy Thornton the Member of Parliament for Clapham for his authorship of a book called Safeguards for Peace.
