= Mantegna Tarocchi =

Two sets of fifty 15th-century Italian engravings

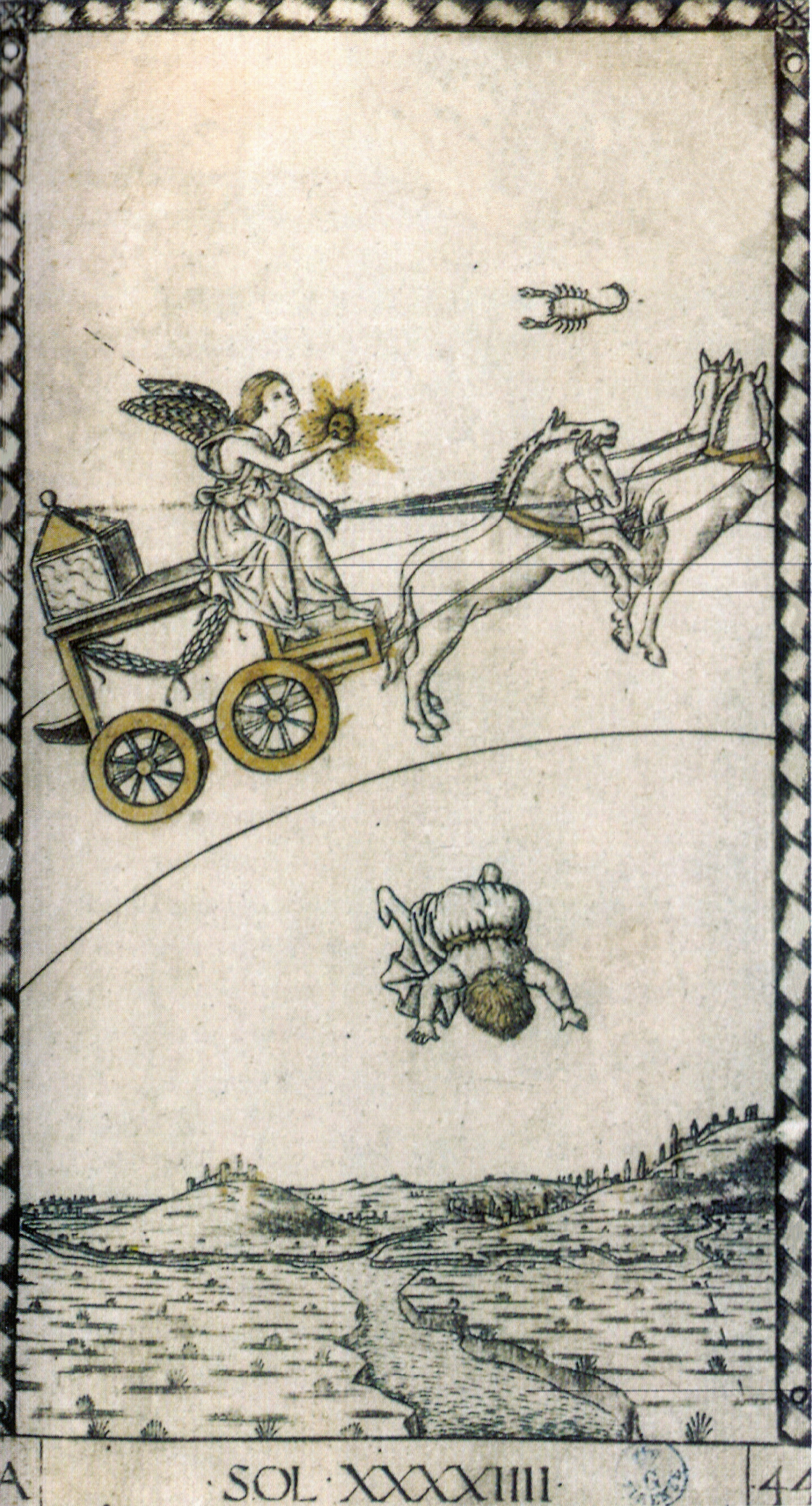
Engraving no. A 44, Sol (The Sun), from the E-series

The Mantegna Tarocchi, also known as the Tarocchi Cards, Tarocchi in the style of Mantegna, Baldini Cards, are two different sets each of fifty 15th-century Italian old master prints in engraving, by two different unknown artists. The sets are known as the E-series Tarocchi Cards and the S-series Tarocchi Cards (or E series, e-series etc.), and their artists are known as the “Master of the E-series Tarocchi” and the “Master of the S-series Tarocchi”. There are also a number of copies and later versions. Despite their name, they are educational visual aids, showing personifications of social classes or abstractions.

== Name a misnomer ==
The name appears to be a mistaken confusion by later writers with the contemporary card-game of Tarocco, which includes many extra picture-cards. Mantegna Tarrochi were not used for card games or divination, but were likely educational tools for upper-class children, although no documentation of their use survives. Some sets bound up in book form at early dates survive (e.g. BNF, Paris, and Pavia), and all examples are printed on single sheets of thin paper. Examples in Cincinnati and New York have traces of hand-colouring in gold, which is very rare in prints

Art historians no longer believe Andrea Mantegna was the engraver of any of them, as was thought until the nineteenth century, but the name is still used, mostly as “the so-called Mantegna Tarocchi”. Baccio Baldini was a Florentine engraver who was also brought into consideration as a possible author in the past, hence the name also used in the past of Baldini Cards or Tarocchi. Due to the similarities with the style of the Salone dei Mesi of Palazzo Schifanoia in Ferrara, there is a growing consensus the engravings were made by artists working with Francesco del Cossa, at the Estensi Court

== E and S series ==
They remain important examples of Italian engraving, and are mostly owned by museums as part of their collections of old master prints. The original two sets are called the E-series and the S-series, of which the E-series is generally considered the older (since AM Hind made the case). It is on the whole the better engraved, and usually the better printed of the two. Differences between the two show the E-series Master was more aware of the literary sources for his images. Most images are reversed between the series (i.e. mirror-images).

Their place and dates of creation are still debated, but Ferrara about 1465 (E-series) and 1470-5 (S-series) are considered most likely. Some of the images are copied in a manuscript dated 1467, which is believed to give a terminus ante quem for the E-series.

The titles of some cards are written in a Ferraran or Venetian dialect — “Doxe” for Doge or Duke, and “Artixan” for artisan. Some subjects were copied from playing-cards, and some from other sources in contemporary art. Other designs had to be invented. Two prints on quite different subjects have been generally attributed to the unknown “Master of the E-series Tarocchi”, and one to the “Master of the S-series Tarocchi”.

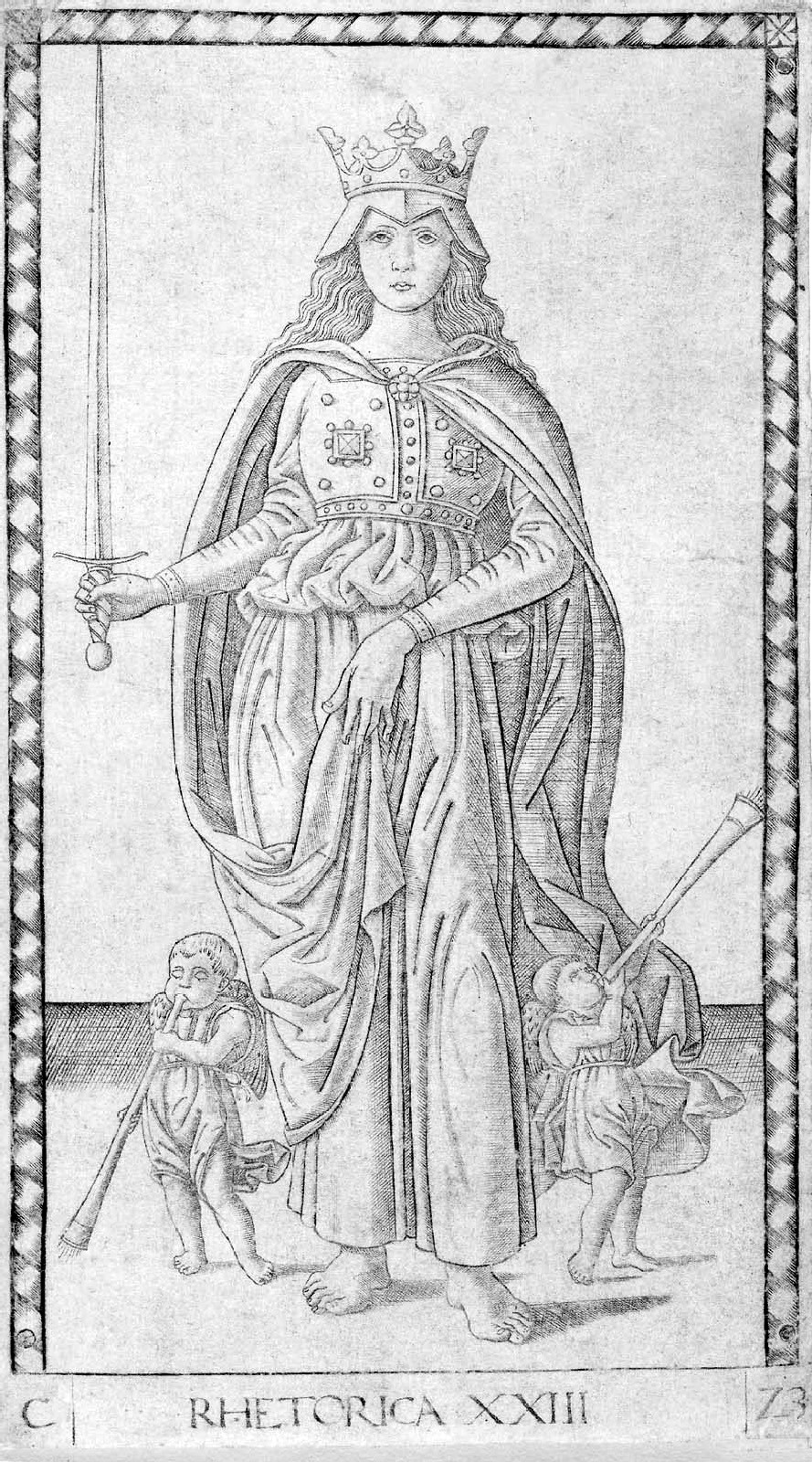
No. C 23, Rhetorica (rhetoric), E-series

== Contents of the sets ==
In card terms all are “picture” or “court” cards. There is the name and number of the card in Roman numerals at the bottom, and the group capital letter and number in arabic numerals in squares in the bottom corners. All have simple decorative borders. The subjects are grouped in five sequences numbered: 1-10, 11-20, 21-30, 31-40 and 41-50, each group consisting of ten engravings:

- E/S (1-10): Conditions of Man — Hierarchy of persons, from beggar to emperor and pope:

1 Beggar (Misero)
2 Servant (Fameio)
3 Craftsman (Artixan)
4 Merchant (Merchadante)
5 Gentleman (Zintilomo)
6 Knight (Chavalier)
7 Doge (Doxe)
8 King (Re)
9 Emperor (Imperator)
10 Pope (Papa)

- D (11-20): The nine Muses and Apollo
- C (21-30): The seven Liberal arts and three other fields of study of the time: Philosophy, Poetry and Theology depicted based on the descriptions give by late antiquity author Martianus Capella
- B (31-40): 3 Genia of light: Genius of the Sun (Iliaco), Genius of Time (Chronico) and Genius of the world (Cosmico), and the Seven virtues
- A (41-50): The seven Spheres of the Sun, Moon and five traditional planets (Mercury, Venus, Mars, Jupiter and Saturn), the eighth sphere (Octava Spera) of the fixed stars, the Primum Mobile and Prima Causa (First Cause, God)

The complete set is a humanistic model of the Renaissance cosmos. The letter “E” of the first group, for “Estates” (of Man) in Italian was changed to the letter “S” for “Stations” between the E and S series, hence the names for the two series.

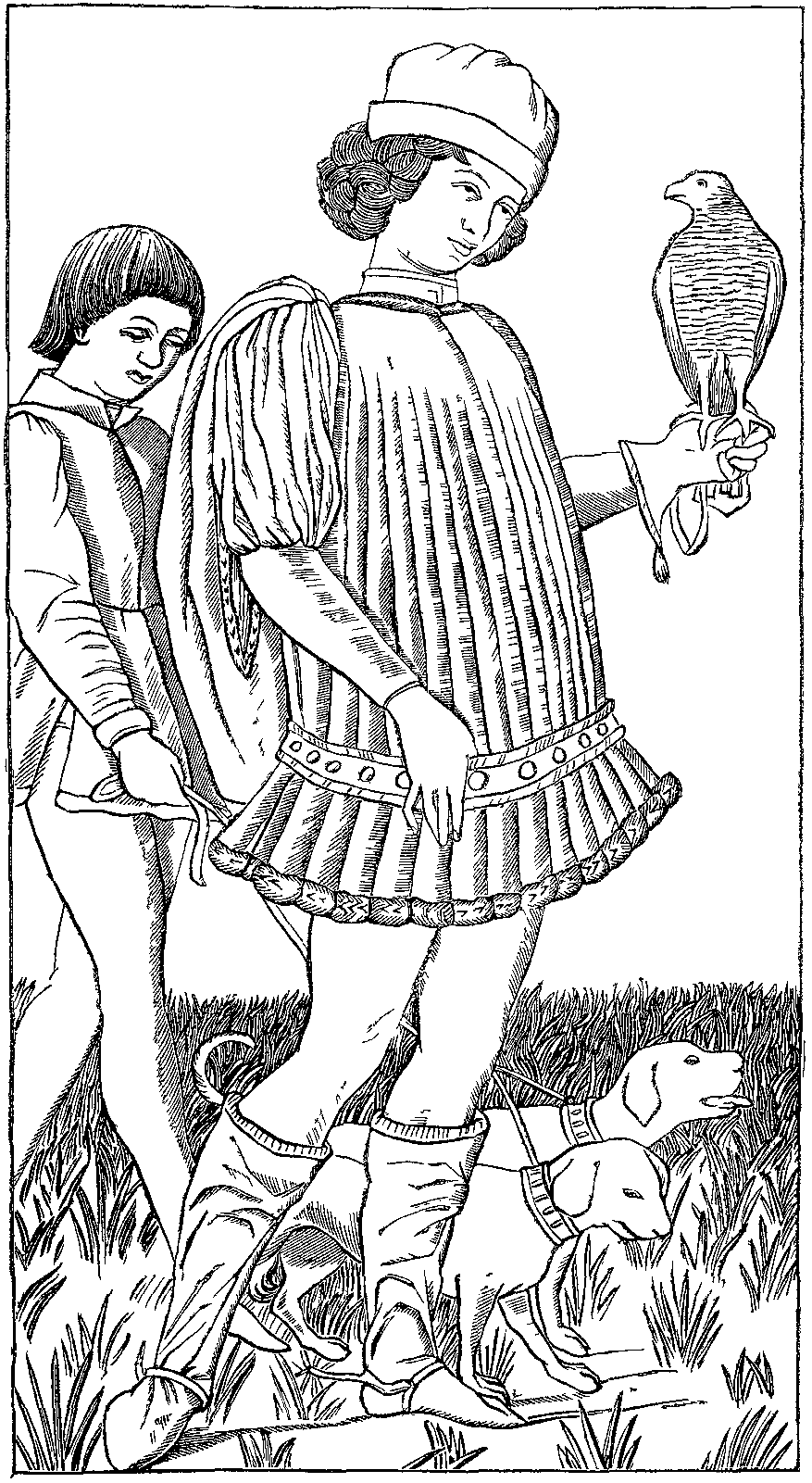
No. 5, Zintilomo (The Gentleman)

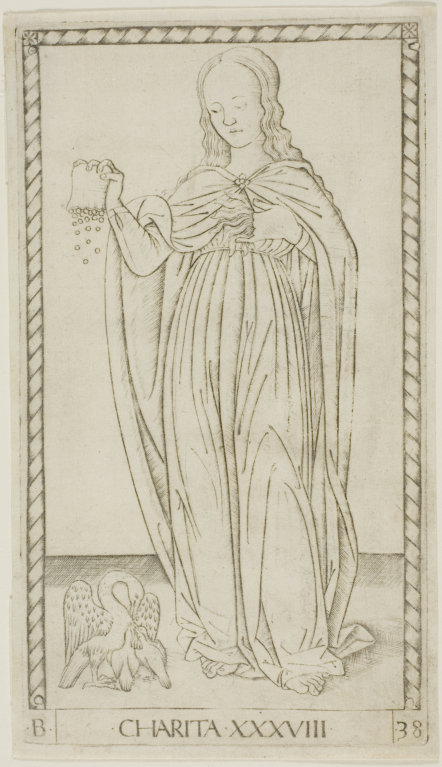
E-Series, B 38, Charity

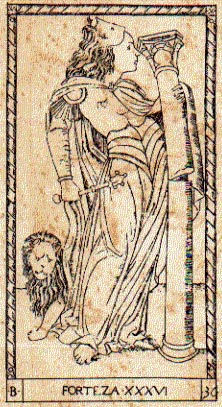
No. 36, Forteza (Fortitude)

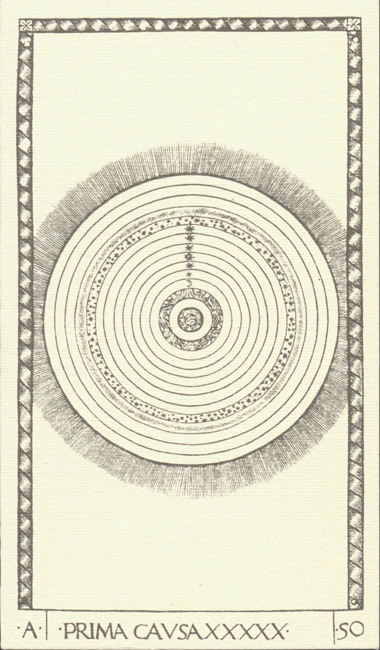
No. A 50, E-Series, Prima causa (First Cause, God)

== Later versions ==
There were later copied versions, mainly by German artists:

- Michael Wolgemut 1493-1497 (Dürer’s Master) tried to realise a book-project
- Albrecht Dürer drew copies of several during his visits to Italy 1495 and 1505, presumably just for his own reference.
- Johann Ladenspelder in Cologne produced ca. 1550 a complete copy of the E-series
- Andrea Ghisi (early 17th century) incorporated the figures inside a game, the Labyrinth game, adding some other new motifs
- Cécile Reims (Paris, born 1927) etched 14 tarot cards from the pseudo Mantegna Tarocchi, all of them visible at the Louvre Chalcography
- Corina Nika (aka Cocorrina) restored the Master E series and reproduced the deck under the name Renais Tarot

== See also ==
- Trionfi (cards)
- De ludo globi
