= Johann Ladenspelder =

German printmaker and engraver

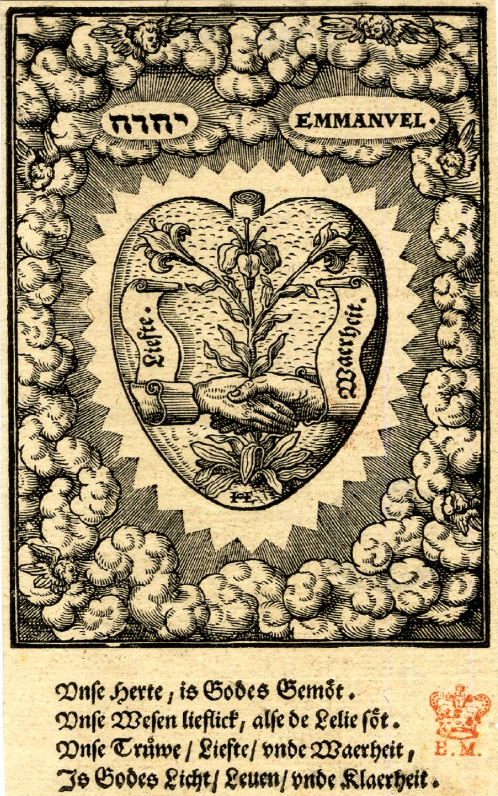
Print made by Ladenspelder in 1574

Johann (Hans) Ladenspelder (born Essen, 1512 - died after 1574) (a.k.a. Hans of Essen) was a German printmaker and engraver.

Austrian scholar and artist Adam Bartsch, in Le Peintre Graveur (1819), had described twenty prints with the monogram JLVES, which he interpreted with Johann Ladenspelder von Essen sculpscit.

Johann Ladenspelder is particularly known for engraving a copy of a complete set (E series) of Mantegna Tarocchi cards, one of the earliest complete sets still extant.

According to the Italian art historian Giordano Berti, Ladenspelder's choice to re-engrave the Mantegna Tarot is part of the intellectual movement that, from the end of the fifteenth century was pioneered by Albrecht Dürer, drew fully on the humanistic culture and pictorial arts of the Italian Renaissance, thus revitalizing German art.
