= Balsham =

Village in Cambridgeshire, England

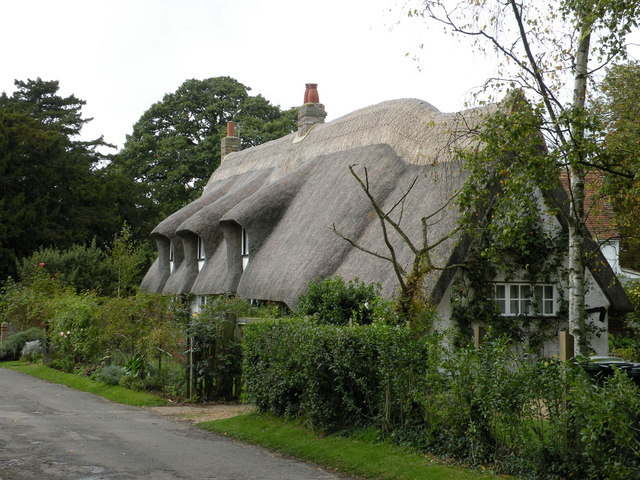
- Thatched cottage, Balsham

- Location within Cambridgeshire
- Population: 3,594 (2021 Census)
- OS grid reference: TL591507
  - London: 59 miles (95 km)
- District: South Cambridgeshire
- Shire county: Cambridgeshire
- Region: East
- Country: England
- Sovereign state: United Kingdom
- Post town: CAMBRIDGE
- Postcode district: CB21
- Dialling code: 01223
- Police: Cambridgeshire
- Fire: Cambridgeshire
- Ambulance: East of England
- UK Parliament: South Cambridgeshire

Balsham is a rural village and civil parish in the county of Cambridgeshire, England, which has much expanded since the 1960s and is now one of several dormitory settlements of Cambridge. The village is south east of the centre of Cambridge beyond the A11 road and near Newmarket and Haverhill.

At the 2021 census, Balsham parish had a population of 3,594.

== History ==
In 1015, Balsham was totally destroyed by Viking raiders. A sign on the village green commemorates the sole survivor of the attack who escaped by hiding in the parish church. It was the birthplace of scholastic philosopher Adam of Balsham.

In 1568 Richard Killingworth, Esq., was granted an estate at Balsham, which in 1590 belonged to his son and heir John Killingworth and was called Place Manor, much later becoming Place Farm. In 1617, the year of John's death, he still held the manor on the site of what in 1975 was called Balsham Place, together with freehold and copyhold lands, an enclosure in Balsham Wood, and heathland in the west part of the parish. His eldest son Giles (born 1571) thereafter held the manor of the Charterhouse Foundation, the feudal superior. A Mr. Killingworth still held the estate in 1715 when it appeared to extend to 261 acres, but in 1756 it was for sale.

The area between Balsham and West Wratting is said to be the haunt of the mythical Shug Monkey.

== Holy Trinity Church ==
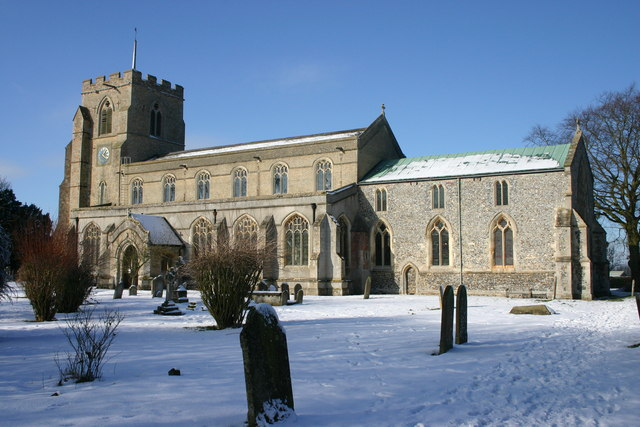
Holy Trinity Church in the snow

The current church has a mix of dates, with the bell tower being the oldest part, dating from the 13th century. It was possibly built by Hugh de Balsham, who was Bishop of Ely between 1257 and 1286. The chancel dates from the early 14th century, whilst the nave with its clerestory dates from the late 14th – the 26 stalls with their misericords were added during this building phase and probably date from 1400. A rood loft was added in the latter half of the 15th century, and the chancel roof was raised with its clerestory being added at the same time.

At some (unrecorded) time between the Dissolution of the Monasteries and the end of The Commonwealth, 17 of the misericords were removed, leaving nine. In the 19th century one misericord, which may have been the work of Canon H.J.S. Burrell, a former rector who was a noted woodcarver, was added.

The 19th century saw some extensive renovation, with the roofs being renewed, and the clerestories being repaired. A vestry was added on the north side in 1867, and further restoration was carried out in 1875. Further works have been carried out in the 20th century, with the addition of a chapel in the north aisle, containing an Elizabethan altar table. In 1973 the bell tower was strengthened.

There are images and a description of the church at the Cambridgeshire Churches website. The church has a number of 15th-century memorial brasses, including two rectors, John Sleford (d. 1401) and John Blodwell (d. 1462), and an unknown knight in Yorkist armour (c.1480s). The brasses have been moved from their original locations within the church.

The village was at one time noted for its large community of Familists, members of an Anabaptist religious sect led by Christopher Vitell. There is also an extensive history of other non-conformist congregations, from at least 1654.

== Governance ==
Until 2024, Balsham was part of the now-abolished South East Cambridgeshire constituency for UK general elections, a Conservative safe seat. Under new boundaries established in the 2023 Periodic Review of Westminster constituencies, the village became part of South Cambridgeshire at the 2024 general election. The constituency has been represented by Liberal Democrat MP Pippa Heylings since July 2024.

Balsham is in the Linton Electoral Division for County Council elections.

Balsham is in the South Cambridgeshire local government district. Balsham Parish Council meets on the 3rd Monday of each month (excluding August and December) at the Sports Pavilion. The village is part of a two-seat Ward that also comprises Carlton, Castle Camps, Horseheath, Shudy Camps, West Wickham, West Wratting and Weston Colville.

== Geography ==
Balsham is a large parish covering 1,831 hectares (4,520 acres). It is located at 52°7′54″N 0°19′22″E in south east Cambridgeshire, near the county boundaries with Essex and Suffolk. The village is 9 miles (14 km) south east of the city of Cambridge. The larger village of Linton is to the south west, and smaller villages of West Wickham and West Wratting lie to the south east and north east respectively.

The village is sited on a ridge which runs from east to west, reaching 380 feet (116 m) at its eastern edge. From the village, the ground falls away to open countryside.

== Economy and landmarks ==
Balsham has a post office/general store and a Coffee Shop (which was, until recently, a butcher's shop, hence the name "The Old Butchers"). The village also has two public houses – The Black Bull and The Bell.

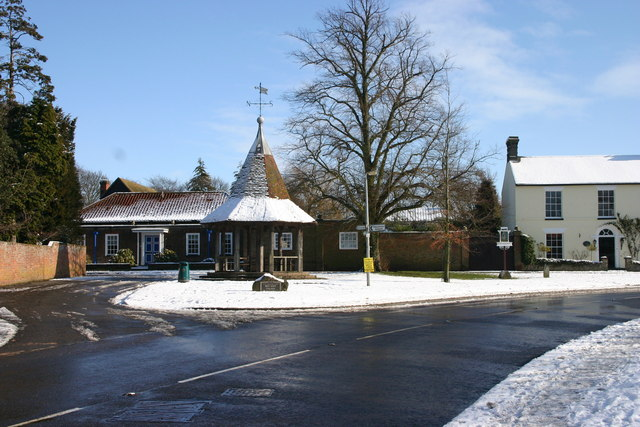
The Prince's Memorial bandstand.

Prince's Memorial is a full-sized bandstand opposite the village green.

The Icknield Way Path passes through the village on its 110-mile journey from Ivinghoe Beacon in Buckinghamshire to Knettishall Heath in Suffolk. The Icknield Way Trail, a multi-user route for walkers, horse riders and off-road cyclists also passes through the village. A stone marking the route of the Icknield Way is located on the village green.

== Transport ==
There is a very limited local bus service running through the village operated by Stagecoach that terminates in Cambridge. Buses run approximately every two hours between Haverhill and Cambridge. The A11 road runs within 2 miles (3 km) of Balsham, providing easy links to Stansted Airport and London . The nearest railway stations to Balsham are Audley End and Whittlesford Parkway on the West Anglia Main Line to London Liverpool Street, and Cambridge which connects several lines including the Cambridge line to London King's Cross. Balsham is served by two airports: Cambridge Airport and London Stansted which is about 20 miles away.

Balsham was served briefly by train in the 1840s by Balsham Road on the Newmarket Railway, one of the earliest railway closures in history when the line was diverted to Cambridge.

== Education ==
The Meadow Community Primary School on the High Street provides for primary school children aged from 4 to 11. The school had 234 pupils in 2016. Children from the surrounding villages West Wratting, West Wickham, and Weston Colville also attend the school, travelling there by bus. Children of secondary school age travel to nearby Linton Village College.

== Culture and sports ==
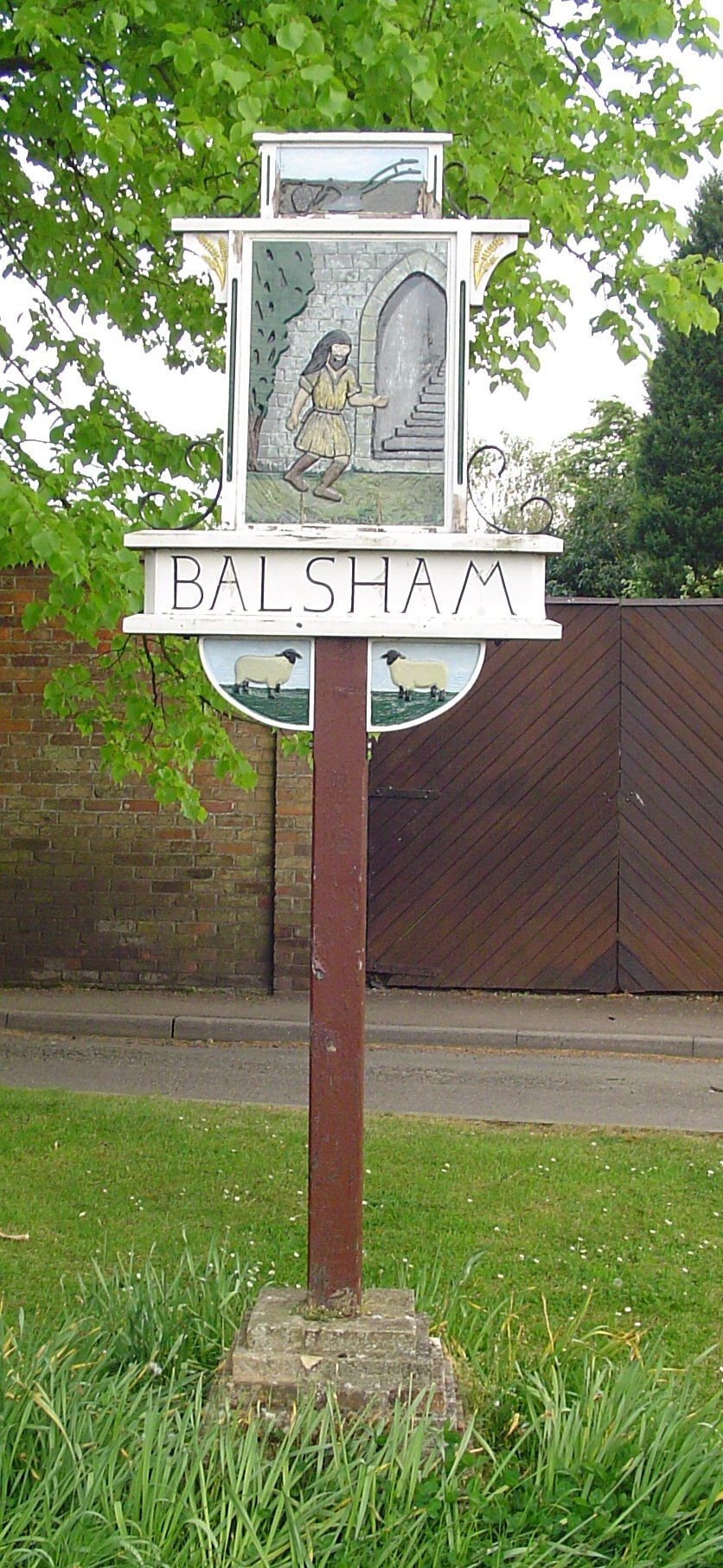
The Balsham village sign

The Holy Trinity Church holds two services every Sunday and communion every Wednesday. The church also plays host to two yearly concerts by the village choir, the Balsham Singers. The village has a large recreation ground and bowling green used by football, cricket, and bowls teams.

== Media ==
Balsham is covered by several local newspapers. The Cambridge Evening News is published each afternoon and occasionally contains news about the village, while the Haverhill Echo appears every Thursday. The Saffron Walden Reporter is a free newspaper delivered weekly to every residence in the village. Balsham Review is a monthly parish magazine with local news, sporting reports, and advertisements. Local radio stations include BBC Radio Cambridgeshire and Heart East.

== See also ==
- Hugh de Balsham
