= Henry Nicholis =

16th-century German mystic

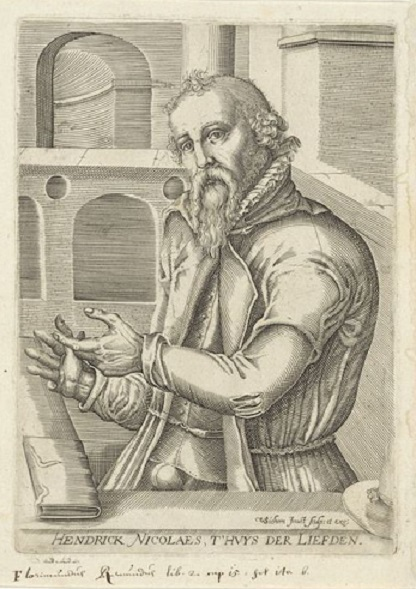
Hendrik Niclaes

Hendrik Nicholis (or Hendrik Niclaes, Henry Nichlaes, Heinrich Niclaes; c. 1501 – c. 1580) was a German mystic and founder of the proto-deist sect "Familia Caritatis" (a.k.a. "Family of Love","Familia Caritatis" or "Hus der Lieften").

== Life ==
Nicholis was born in 1501 or 1502 at Münster, where he was married and was a prosperous merchant.

As a boy he was subject to visions, and at the age of twenty-seven charges of heresy led to his imprisonment. About 1530 he moved with his family to Amsterdam, where he was imprisoned on a charge of complicity in the Münster Rebellion of 1534–1535.

About 1539 he experienced a call to found his "Family of Love". In 1540 he moved to Emden, where he prospered in business for twenty years, though he traveled to the Netherlands, England and elsewhere with commercial and missionary objectives. The date of his sojourn in England has been placed as early as 1552 and as late as 1569. His activities in England contributed to the Puritan controversies that formed the backdrop of Queen Elizabeth I's reign.

Nicholis hoped that his "Family of Love" could promote wider religious reformation in Europe. He worked through powerful friends to bring about change: Christopher Plantin, Abraham Ortel who called himself Ortelius, and the genre painter and political cartoonist Pieter Brueghel the Elder. His doctrines seem to have been derived largely from the Dutch Anabaptist David Joris.

The date of his death is unknown; in 1579 he was living at Cologne, and it is likely that he died there a year or two later.

== Evolution of the doctrine ==
Nicholis's doctrines have mainly to be inferred from the accounts of hostile writers. The outward trappings of his system were merely Anabaptist; but he anticipated a good many later speculations, and his followers were accused of asserting that all things were ruled by nature and not directly by God, of denying the dogma of the Trinity, and repudiating infant baptism. They held that no man should be put to death for his opinions, and apparently, like the later Quakers, they objected to the carrying of arms and to anything like an oath; and they were quite impartial in their repudiation of all other churches and sects, including Brownists and Barrowists.

Nicholis's principal disciple in England was Christopher Vitell, and towards 1579 the progress of the sect especially in the eastern counties of England provoked literary attacks, proclamations and parliamentary bills. But Nicholis's followers escaped the gallows and the stake, through their combination of wisdom and apparent harmlessness. They would only discuss their doctrines with sympathizers; they showed every respect for authority, and considered outward conformity a duty. This quietist attitude, while it saved them from molestation, hampered propaganda; and though the Family existed until the middle of the 17th century, it was then swallowed up by the Quakers, Baptists and Unitarians, all of which denominations may have derived some of their ideas through the Family from the Anabaptists.

== Works ==
Most of his writings come from his time at Emden. His primary work was Den Spegel der Gherechticheit dorch den Geist der Liefden unde den vergodeden Menscit I-IN. uth de hernmelisc tie Warheit betuget. It appeared in an English form—with Nicholis's revisions—as An introduction to the holy Understanding of the Glasse of Righteousness (c.1575; reprinted in 1649). The list of Nicholis's works occupies nearly six columns in the Dictionary of National Biography.

Nicholis signed his works with his initials, "H.N.", which coincidentally also stood for Homo Novus, "new man", which became a sort of call sign for the movement.

== See also ==
- Justus Velsius
