= Organ of St Mary's Church (Tickhill) =

The Brindley organ of St Mary's Church, Tickhill, South Yorkshire, England is a Victorian pipe organ influenced by the German organ building tradition.

== History ==
The plaque of 1857 names the builder as Charles Brindley of Brindley & Foster. The instrument at St Mary's was one of the first organs that he completed.

The middle of the 19th century was a period of tremendous change and development. The railway network was branching out over the countryside, and came to Doncaster in 1848. The Great Exhibition of 1851 was a showcase of talent. One of the exhibits of the symposium was an organ made by the German organ builder Edmund Schulze, who recently moved to England.

Prior to the Great Exhibition the English church organ was a small affair compared with its European counterpart. At Tickhill there had been a ‘finger’ organ since 1831. This, in its turn, had replaced the minstrels who led the worship from a gallery situated at the West End of the church. Few organs in the English Parish Church in the mid-19th century could cope with the great European tradition of organ music (the Bachs and Buxtehude). It must have been clear to Edmund Schulze soon after his arrival in England in 1851 that in the instrument he brought to the Great Exhibition he had something new to offer.

Brindley had been trained in the family business of installing domestic call bell systems in large houses. The method of operating these systems was an action consisting of wires and levers, a type of mechanical or tracker action not dissimilar to an action used in organ movements.

It seems likely that Brindley met Schulze at the Great Exhibition. He certainly went to Paulinzelle in Germany to learn the art of organ building. Especially the flute pipes (in German called Hohlflote, Gedackt or Rohrflote) took on a new sound with German scale and voicing techniques.

Brindley began his own organ building business in Carver Street, Sheffield on 1 January 1854. The St Mary's specification shows the Schulze influence. It is the first time that a complete diapason chorus from goes an 8-foot Open Diapason to a 4 rank Mixture.

An earlier commission for Brindley was for a temporary organ for the Parish Church of St George, Doncaster (see note^{1}). Following the success of this Doncaster instrument, Brindley was asked to build an organ for the medieval church at Tickhill.

Although remedial work has been done on the action, blower and console, the organ is played regularly and maintains a good condition.

== Original specification ==
Great Organ
Double Stopped Diapason	16'
Open Diapason	8'
Geigen Principal	8'
Rohrfloete (Brindley's Spelling)	8'
Dulciana	8'
Principal	4'
Flute	4'
12th & 15th	2 2/3' & 2', 2 ranks
Mixture (19.22.26.29)	4 ranks
Trumpet	8'
Clarion	4'

Swell Organ
Double Stopped Diapason	16'
Lieblich Gedackt	8'
Viol d'amour	8'
Principal	4
Mixture (15.19.22.26)	4 ranks
Hautboy	8'
French Horn	8'

Pedal Organ
Violin Diapason	16'
Principal	8'

Miscellaneous
Coupler Swell to Great
Coupler Great to Pedal
Thunder Pedal
Lever Swell Pedal
4 combination pedals
There was a spare slide on the Great for a Clarinet 8', which was never inserted.

== Rebuilds ==
=== Pre-centenary rebuilding ===
The organ was rebuilt twice before its centenary. In 1896 Brindley and Foster rebuilt and repositioned the organ, moving it to the Laughton Chapel (the North chapel, now known as St Helen's Chapel). A new oak case was given by Mrs. Curtis, a descendant of the Laughton family.

In 1937 Wood Wordsworth of Leeds removed the organ again, this time into a position behind the choir on the South side of the chancel where it remains today. The blower was electrified; until this time it was hand blown.

=== Post-centenary rebuilding ===
At the time of the centenary the organ was in a poor state, especially the old tracker action and in 1965 the firm of J. W. Walker (London) rebuilt the instrument at the huge cost of £4,409. The work included new tracker action to the manuals (except lowest octave on the Swell which was electro-pneumatic), electro-pneumatic action to the pedals, new console, balanced Swell pedal, extended Pedal stops, new Open Diapason on the Swell and new thumb and toe pistons.

The inaugural recital was given by Brian Runnett, organist of Norwich Cathedral on 27 November 1965.

By 1985 the experimental wire tracking action had become unreliable and was completely restored to original wood with solenoid assistance for the Swell to Great coupler. The bellows were re-leathered and the soundboards were overhauled. New stops were added to the Great:

- Flautina 2' placed on the slide of the former Clarion which was removed in 1965
- Sesquialtera II (12.17) placed on the Clarinet slide

The work was done by John Clough (Bradford) who maintains the organ to this day. The opening recital was given by Dr. Francis Jackson (York Minster) on 21 October 1985.

Towards the end of the century a new 28 point capture system was installed and the stop positions altered to reflect the growing specification. Preparations were made for future additions which to date include:

- Fifteenth 2' (rank of pipes at the front of the Swell box) (2002)
- Double Trumpet 16' on the Pedal organ (2007)

This now gives a very comprehensive range of stops with which to accompany regular worship and provides scope for the extended repertoire for recitals.

== Current specification ==
Great Organ
Double Stopped Diapason	16'
Open Diapason	8'
Geigen Principal	8'
Rohrfloete	8'
Dulciana	8'
Principal	4'
Flute	4'
Flautina	2'
Sesquialtera (12.17)	2 2/3', 2 ranks
Quartane (12.15) (formerly 12th & 15th)	2 2/3', 2 ranks
Mixture (19.22.26.29)	1 1/3', 4 ranks
Trumpet	8'

Swell Organ
Open Diapason	8'
Leiblich Gedackt	8'
Salicional (formerly Viol d'amour)	8'
Principal	4
Mixture (15.19.22.26)	2', 4 ranks
Contra Oboe (formerly Hautboy)	16'
Cornopean (formerly French Horn)	8'
Tremulant	

Pedal Organ
Open wood (Unit A)	16'
Bourdon (Unit B)	16'
Quint (Unit B)	10 2/3'
Principal (Unit A)	8'
Bass Flute (Unit B)	8'
Fifteenth (Unit A)	4'
Octave Flute (Unit B)	4'
Double Trumpet	16'

Couplers
Swell to Great
Great to Pedal
Swell to Pedal
7 Thumb Pistons to Great
6 Thumb Pistons to Swell
6 Toe Pistons to Great
5 Toe Pistons to Swell

== Organists ==
1831–1846	James Whitaker	
1846–1849	Unknown	
1849–1858	Benjamin Clarkson	
1858–1889	Thomas Duffy	
1889–1898	Dr. G. Havelock	
1898–1931	James Ellis	
1931–1975	Margaret M. Wren	Assisted at times by Mrs. Bramley, Mr. Brookes, Mr B. Shaw & Mr. Jack Burchby
1975–1978	Ralph Jack	
1978–1983	John King	
1983–	John Marsden	

== Notes ==
1.

Doncaster's medieval church was destroyed by fire at the end of February 1853. Plans were soon made for a three manual organ to be made, accompanying first the services held in the Grammar School (Thorne Road) and then rebuilt in the church for its rededication in October 1858. After the completion of the five manual instrument by Edmund Schulze at St George's in 1862, the Brindley organ was sold to the newly built St James Church.
