= Odsey (hundred) =

Odsey was a judicial and taxation subdivision (a "hundred") of Hertfordshire, in the northeast of the county, that existed from the 10th to the 19th century.

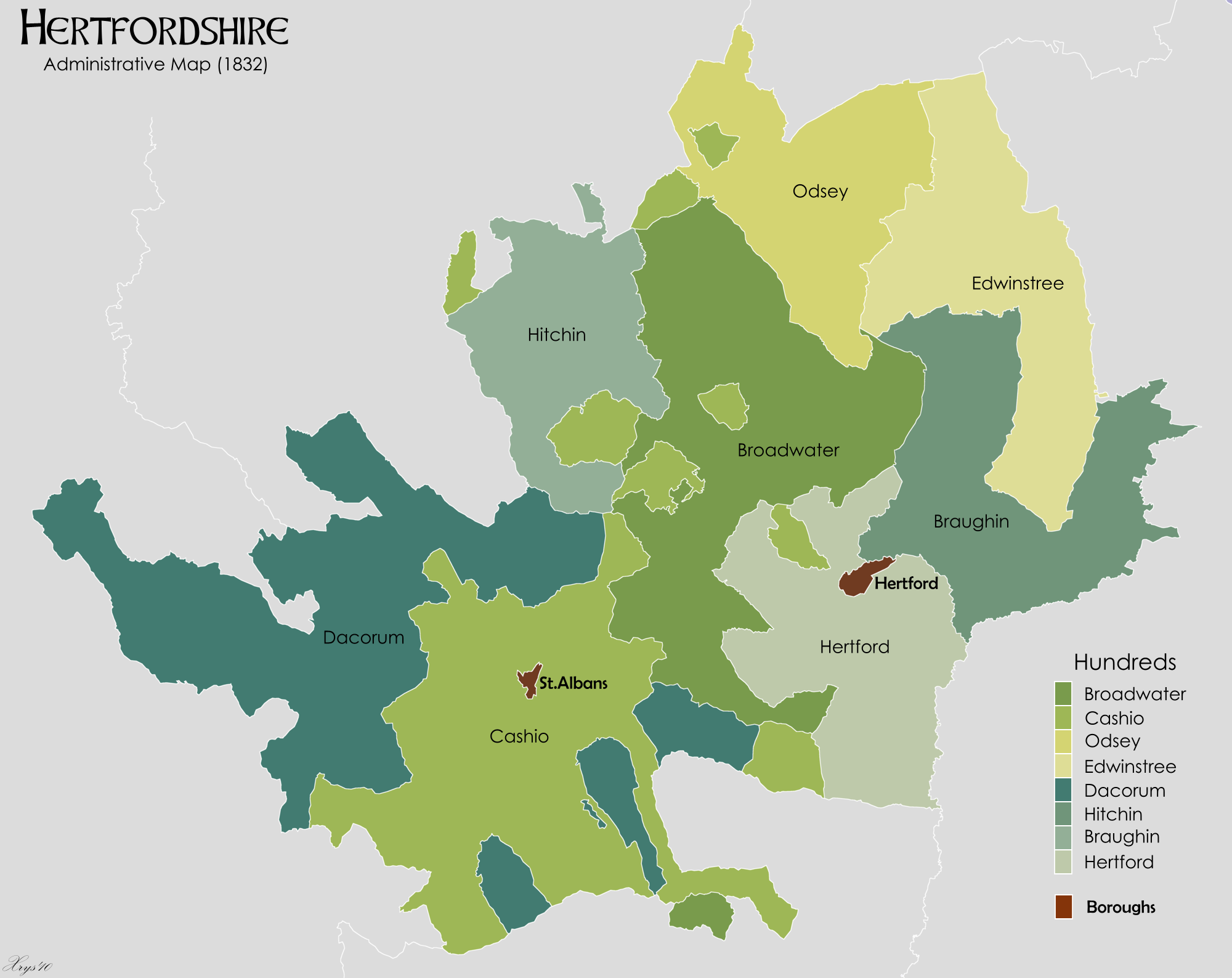
Odsey Hundred in 1832

It comprised the following parishes: Ardeley, Ashwell, Broadfield, Bygrave, Caldecote, Clothall, Cottered, Hinxworth, Kelshall, Newnham, Radwell, Reed, Royston, Rushden, Sandon, Therfield and Wallington. Newnham was transferred to Cashio Hundred some time between 1086 and 1286.

The hundred appears to have been named after Odsey, part of the neighbouring parish of Guilden Morden, Cambridgeshire, indicating that the hundred originally included additional territory to the north.

The hundred was owned by the King and farmed, together with neighbouring Edwinstree, by the Sheriff of Hertfordshire. In 1613 it was granted to "William Whitmore and others" in trust for Sir Julius Adelmare.

Haslam proposes that the hundred was originally part of a larger "proto-hundred" which comprised the five East Hertfordshire hundreds of Braughing, Edwinstree, Odsey, Broadwater and Hertford; this territory was originally created to support the two Burhs at Hertford, on opposite banks of the River Lea, built by King Edward the Elder in 913 to defend against the Danes. The interlocking nature of Braughing and Edwinstree hundreds is taken as evidence that they were originally part of a single unit that was later subdivided into hundreds.
