= St Leonard's Hospital, Tickhill =

Coordinates: 53°26′02″N 1°06′35″W

St Leonard's Hospital
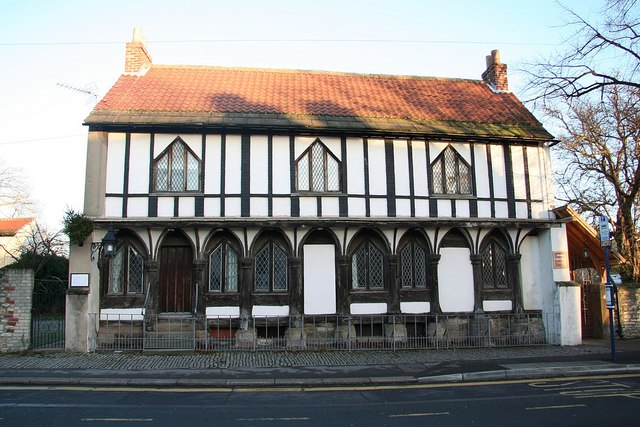

General information
- Address: Northgate, Tickhill
- Completed: 1470
- Renovated: 1851

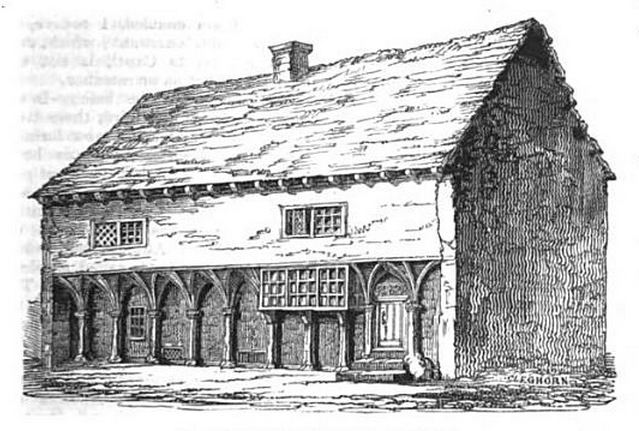
The hospital in 1844, prior to restoration.

St Leonard's Hospital is a grade II* listed timber-framed building in Tickhill, South Yorkshire, in England. It was originally constructed in the 15th century as a monastic building.

The first hospital in Tickhill dedicated to Saint Leonard was on Spital Hill, a marshy location outside the built-up part of the town, considered suitable as accommodation for lepers. It was already in existence by 1225, when Walter de Gray, Archbishop of York, deplored the decayed condition of the friars attending and called for charitable donations. The lepers were first mentioned in 1236, while from 1290, John Clarel attempted to improve conditions at the hospital. There has been scholarly debate as to whether this is the same foundation as that of St Thomas in the marsh, a cell of Humberston Abbey.

In 1470, the hospital was relocated to the north side of Tickhill Market Place. An inscription above the door suggests that the rebuilding was the work of a John Leftwul. The reasons for the move are unknown, but David Hey notes that this must have involved a change in purpose, as town centres were not considered suitable locations for lepers. The building eventually declined; by the 1840s, it was used as tenements, but the facade was substantially intact. It was heavily restored in 1851, with the upper floor being completely rebuilt in a Gothic revival style. In 1898, it was purchased by the local parish church, who turned it into a parish meeting room. It was again restored in 2007.

As it stands, the hospital has ten bays separated by wooden posts, carrying half-fan vaulting supporting an oversailing upper storey. The top floor has three distinctive windows with straight sides but pointed heads. It was made a listed building in 1961 and is currently listed at grade II*.

== See also ==
- Grade II* listed buildings in South Yorkshire
- Listed buildings in Tickhill
