= William de Tickhill =

William de Tickhill (born c. 1290 – died after 1357) was an English priest, Crown official and judge who served very briefly as Chief Baron of the Irish Exchequer.

He took his name from his birthplace Tickhill, now in Doncaster but then in the West Riding of Yorkshire. He is mentioned as being vicar of Eaton, near Tickhill, in 1312. He was presented to the living of Steeple Morden, Cambridgeshire in 1316, and that of Bolton, Lancashire in 1317. He was appointed Keeper of the Royal Wardrobe in 1320, and was later employed abroad on unspecified royal business.

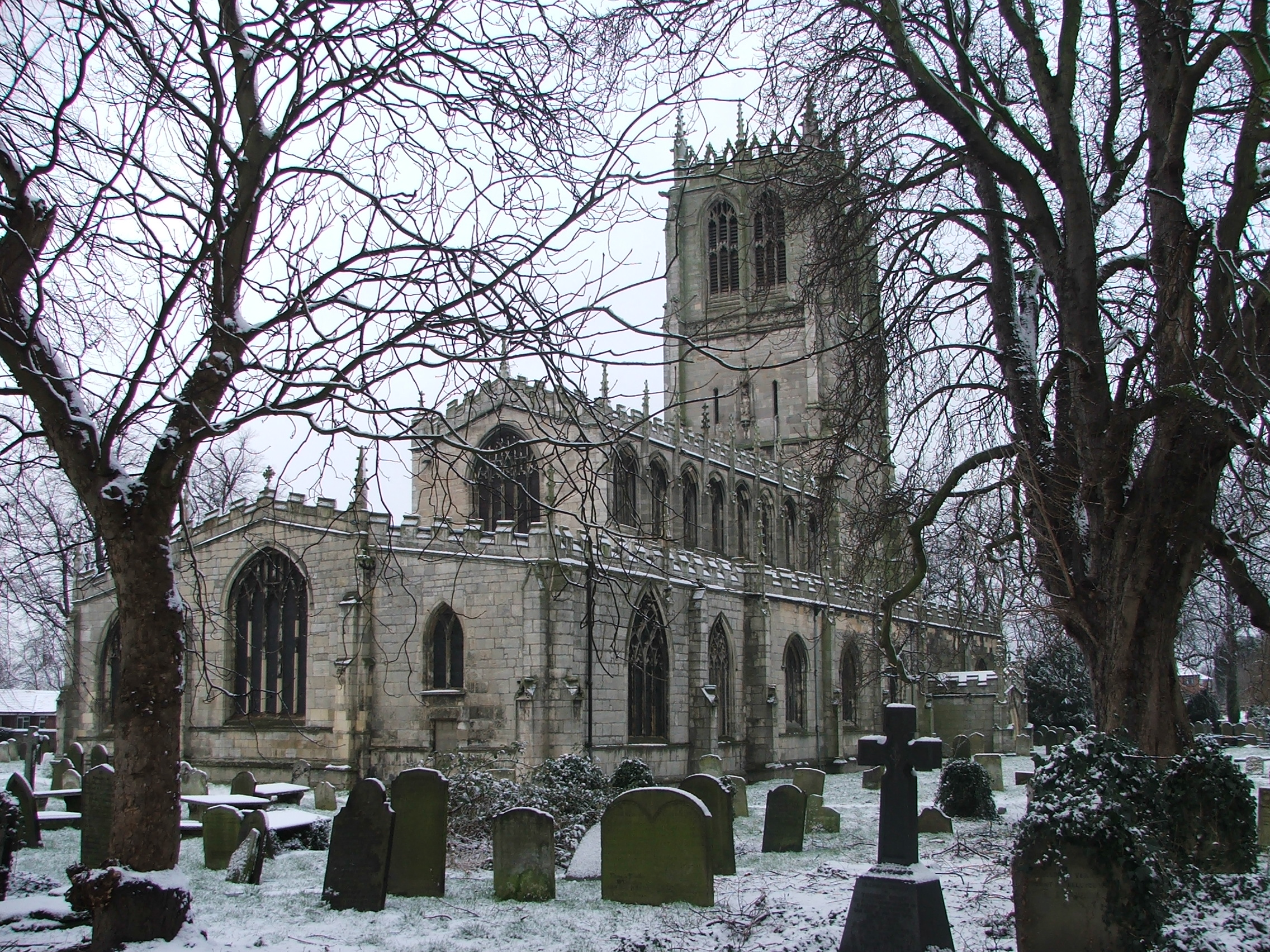
St. Mary's Church, Tickhill – William was born in Tickhill in the late thirteenth century

He was appointed Chief Baron of the Irish Exchequer in 1331 but served in that office only for a few months: he returned to England and was sitting on a Royal Commission there at the end of the same year. He retained some links with Ireland, becoming a prebendary in the Diocese of Ossory in 1332. He went abroad on official business with Richard de Bury, Bishop of Durham, in 1336.

He became vicar of Stanhope, County Durham and warden of Grantham Hospital. He spent his later years in York, and in 1357 he was given permission to found a guild in the city, with himself as one of the fraternity.
