= Steeple Morden =

Village in Cambridgeshire, England

Coordinates: 52.066°N 0.125°W

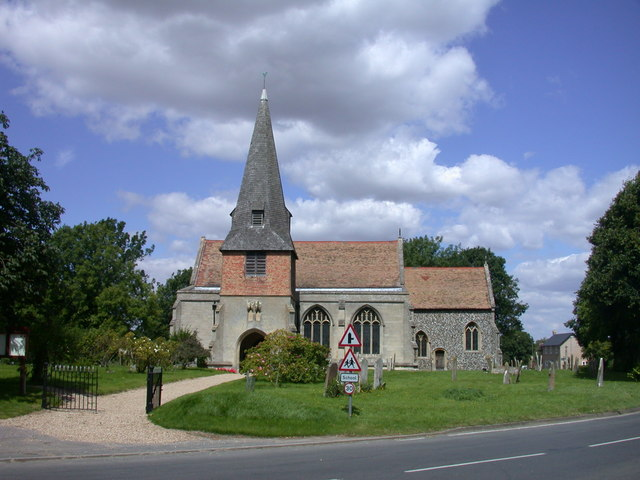
- SS Peter and Paul

- Location within Cambridgeshire
- Population: 963 (2001); 1,078 (2011)
- OS grid reference: TL286425
- District: South Cambridgeshire
- Shire county: Cambridgeshire
- Region: East
- Country: England
- Sovereign state: United Kingdom
- Post town: ROYSTON
- Postcode district: SG8
- Dialling code: 01763

Steeple Morden is a village and civil parish in Cambridgeshire, England, about 15 miles (24 km) south west of Cambridge and 5 miles (8 km) west of Royston. It is part of the South Cambridgeshire local government district.

The parish is combined with the parishes of Abington Pigotts, Guilden Morden and Tadlow to form "The Mordens" ward, which is represented on South Cambridgeshire District Council by one councillor.

== History ==
Steeple Morden parish covers and area of 1,549 hectares (3,830 acres) in a long thin shape stretching from the River Cam at its northern border with Tadlow and Croydon-cum-Clopton to the ancient Icknield Way (now the A505 road) at its southern border with Hertfordshire. Its long western border with Guilden Morden and eastern border with Abington Pigotts and Litlington largely follow streams.

An airfield opened at RAF Steeple Morden in 1938, covering 175 acres to the east of Cheyney Water. It began as a satellite of the base at RAF Bassingbourn and was later used by the 355th Fighter Group of the USAAF. The site of the airfield has now been returned to agricultural use. although the concrete taxiways and runways still remain, part of which is laid on a stretch of local byway known as 'The stret'

Listed as Mordune in the Domesday Book and Stepelmordun in 1242, the name "Morden" means "hill in moor or marshland", with the "Steeple" added signifying "church steeple" to distinguish it from neighbouring Guilden Morden. It was also known as South Morden in the early 13th century.

The railways reached the parish in the mid-19th century, crossing the southernmost end of the parish. Ashwell and Morden railway station, on the Hitchin-Royston railway, opened near the hamlet of Odsey late in 1850 and has remained open since.

== Church ==
The parish church at Steeple Morden has been dedicated to St Peter and St Paul since at least the 14th century. The church was rebuilt in the early 13th century, giving the village its present name. At that time it probably consisted of an aisled nave, a central tower 20 feet square, and a chancel, 28 feet wide and 42 feet long. In the 1860s the church was rebuilt and now comprises an aisled nave with steepled south porch, and a short chancel. Some of the nave arcades remain from the 13th-century building. William de Tickhill, later a senior Crown official, was parson here in 1316.

The original steeple fell in 1625, damaging the nave and destroying the chancel. The nave was repaired, and after disputes over the funding it was decided not to rebuild the chancel, instead leaving a gap where the tower had been until the reconstruction of the 1860s.

== Village life ==
The village has one remaining public house, The Waggon and Horses, which is housed in a 17th-century building opposite the church. Among the many former pubs are The Bell (open by 1737), The Green Man (north end of Hay Street, open by 1810), and Flecks Lion Beerhouse (open in the mid-1800s for the coprolite workers living at The Diggings, at the junction of North Brook End and Flecks Lane). There were 8 pubs in the village in the 1950s, but four closed before 1960, including The Bell. Further afield from Steeple Morden are The Railway Inn, later renamed The Jester, opened near the station in the 19th century, and The Horse and Groom opened alongside the turnpike (now A505). The Horse and Groom closed in the late 20th century, and The Jester is now a pub and hotel.

Ashwell and Morden railway station, a station on the main line from Cambridge to London King's Cross, is situated at the edge of the parish, in the hamlet of Odsey.

Steeple Morden Primary School is a Church of England voluntary controlled school located on Hay Street. The school caters for children between the ages of 4 and 11 with a capacity of 208 pupils. the Headteacher as at June 2026 was Mrs Alexandra Housden
