= Listed buildings in Tickhill =

Tickhill is a civil parish in the metropolitan borough of Doncaster, South Yorkshire, England. The parish contains 121 listed buildings that are recorded in the National Heritage List for England. Of these, one is listed at Grade I, the highest of the three grades, four at Grade II*, the middle grade, and the others are at Grade II, the lowest grade. The parish contains the town of Tickhill and the surrounding countryside. The parish church, St Mary's Church, is listed at Grade I, and the Grade II* listed buildings are an Augustinian friary converted for domestic use, St Leonard's Hospital, later used as a parish room, a house built in the grounds of Tickhill Castle, and Lindrick House from the early 18th century. Most of the other listed buildings are houses, cottages, and associated structures, shops and offices, farmhouses and farm buildings. The rest include the original buttercross and its later replacement, a bridge, a mill, chapels, and a milestone.

== Key ==
Grade	Criteria
I	Buildings of exceptional interest, sometimes considered to be internationally important
II*	Particularly important buildings of more than special interest
II	Buildings of national importance and special interest

== Buildings ==
Name and location	Photograph	Date	Notes	Grade
St Mary's Church; 53.43126°N 1.11083°W		Early 13th century	The church, which was extended and altered through the centuries, is in magnesian limestone and is mainly in Perpendicular style. It consists of a nave with a clerestory, north and south aisles, a north porch, a chancel, a northeast chapel, and a west tower. The tower has clasping buttresses, a west doorway with nailhead decoration, a five-light west window over which are three statues in niches, a frieze of blank quatrefoils, and bell openings. At the top are gargoyles, a parapet with pierced ogee arches with crocketed gables, and crocketed pinnacles. Along the body of the church are embattled parapets and crocketed pinnacles, and the east window has five lights.	I
Arch, The Friary; 53.42815°N 1.11938°W	—	13th century	The arch, probably reset in the garden wall, is in stone. It has a pointed head and a bowtell moulded surround with dog-tooth ornament.	II
Stone cross 53.44288°N 1.11440°W		Medieval	The former buttercross was moved from its original position in Market Place in 1777, and is on the east side of Doncaster Road (A60 road). It is in stone and consists of a chamfered column 3 feet (0.91 m) high, standing on a stone slab plinth.	II
The Friary and Friary Close; 53.42833°N 1.11963°W	—	14th century	The Augustinian friary was converted for domestic use in the 17th century, and enlarged in the 19th century. It is in stone, the roofs are in stone slate on the earlier parts and Welsh slate later. There are two storeys and attics, and the building consists of two medieval blocks joined at the corners, with a later extension to the west block. Most of the windows are mullioned and transomed, and other features include a reset doorway with a rusticated surround dated 1663, and various blocked windows and doorways.	II*
31 Castlegate; 53.43148°N 1.10902°W	—	Late medieval	The house has a timber framed core, and is a fragment of a larger house. The rear wing dates from the 18th century, and the house was refronted in the 19th century. The front is in red brick, the rear wing is in brick and limestone and is partly rendered, and the roof is pantiled. There are two storeys, a front of two bays, and sash windows. The recessed doorway has a stuccoed surround and a moulded cornice, and the frame is jettied to the front.	II
St Leonard's Hospital; 53.43384°N 1.10976°W		1470	A timber framed building, later a parish room, it was restored, and an upper floor was added in 1851 with applied timber framing. It has stone slate eaves, and a pantile roof. There are two storeys and a basement, and ten bays divided by octagonal timber posts on large moulded stone bases, with coved and embattled capitals. These carry rib-vaulting and a jettied upper floor. In the ground floor are six mullioned two-light casement windows with pointed heads and voussoirs, and in the upper floor are three similar windows with three lights.	II*
Moor House Farm House; 53.42869°N 1.08478°W	—	Early 17th century	A rear wing was added to the farmhouse in the early 18th century, which is in stone and brick with a pantile roof. There are two storeys and a front of four bays. The doorway has a chamfered surround and a four-centred arched head, and the windows are casements. The rear wing has three bays and a basement.	II
3 Dam Road and stables 53.42923°N 1.11105°W	—	17th century	The oldest part of the house is the south wing, the main block dating from the 18th century. The building is in stone, partly rendered, with quoins, and pantile roofs with coped gables. The main block has two storeys and an attic, and two bays. The windows are sashes, and there are two gabled attic dormers. A row of stables extends to the west, containing four stable doors, and two openings in the upper floor.	II
Barn behind 31 Northgate; 53.43553°N 1.11020°W	—	17th century or earlier	Originally the rear wing of a house, now demolished, it has a timber framed core, encased in stone, and with a pantile roof. On the north side are a doorway and a loading door, and elsewhere are various blocked openings.	II
61 Northgate; 53.43637°N 1.11077°W	—	17th century (probable)	A stone house, probably with a timber framed core, that has a pantile roof with the coped gable end facing the road. There are two storeys and one bay. The windows are horizontally-sliding sashes.	II
Eastfield Farm House; 53.44146°N 1.10760°W	—	17th century (probable)	The oldest part of the house is the rear wing, with the front range dating from the 18th century. The house is rendered, with stone slate eaves, and a hipped pantile roof. There are two storeys, and the front range has three bays. The doorway has a moulded surround and a rectangular fanlight. The windows in the front range are modern, and in the rear wing they are mullioned or mullioned and transomed.	II
Gate piers and arch, The Friary; 53.42876°N 1.11984°W	—	17th century	At the entrance to the drive are a carriage entrance and a pedestrian entrance in magnesian limestone. The carriage entrance is flanked by chamfered gate piers with conical caps. The pedestrian entrance has a plain chamfered flat arch with angled voussoirs, and a medieval sculpture incorporated above.	II
Tickhill Castle House; 53.42959°N 1.10920°W		17th century (probable)	The house, built in the grounds of Tickhill Castle, was altered and extended in the 18th and 19th centuries. It is in limestone, with moulded string courses, and a slate roof. There are three storeys, the south front has six bays, and there is a rear wing. On the front, two bays project and are gabled, the eastern bay containing a two-storey segmental bay window and a small Venetian window above. The other windows on the front are sashes, and at the rear are mullioned and transomed windows. On the east front are four large buttresses with arches and outshuts between them.	II*
Wellingley Grange Farmhouse; 53.45914°N 1.10654°W	—	Mid to late 17th century	A cross wing was added to the farmhouse in about 1700. The building is in magnesian limestone with a pantile roof. The original range has two storeys and an attic, and four bays, and the cross-wing has two storeys and three bays. Most of the windows are casements, some with hood moulds, the original doorway has a quoined surround, and above it is an insurance plate.	II
11, 15 and 17 Sunderland Street; 53.43267°N 1.10788°W	—	1671	A row of stone cottages with a pantile roof. There are two storeys and four bays, the right bay gabled. Between Nos. 15 and 17 is a carriage entry, and on the gable is a shield containing the date. The windows are modern casements, and above the entry is a dormer.	II
Friary Cottage; 53.42850°N 1.12033°W	—	1688	The house is in magnesian limestone with a pantile roof. There are two storeys and six bays, and all the windows are modern. In the east front are two pointed archways flanking a garage entrance, and in the north gable is a datestone with fleur-de-lys decoration.	II
84 Northgate; 53.43703°N 1.11126°W	—	17th or 18th century	A rendered house, the gable end facing the road, with a pantile roof and a coped gable. There are two storeys and three bays. The house has doorways on the front and the gable end, and the windows are sashes.	II
53, 55 and 57 Northgate; 53.43622°N 1.11078°W	—	1701	A row of three stone houses with a pantile roof. There are two storeys and five bays. In the ground floor are two doorways, in the left bay is a stable door, and in the right bay is a semicircular carriage entrance. Most of the windows are sashes, and on the south gable end is a dated plaque.	II
Elm House; 53.43608°N 1.11063°W	—	1701	The house is rendered, and has quoins, sprocketed stone slate eaves, and a hipped pantile roof. There are two storeys, three bays, and a long lower two-storey rear wing. The central doorway has a chamfered surround, above it is a small round-headed window and a date plaque, and the other windows are sashes.	II
Lindrick House; 53.42750°N 1.11276°W		1724	The house is rendered, with quoins, and a hipped pantile roof. There are two storeys and five bays. Steps lead up to the doorway that has a moulded architrave and a moulded cornice. The windows are sashes.	II*
22, 24 and 26 Castlegate; 53.43155°N 1.10935°W	—	1731	A house, later an office, it is in limestone with a pantile roof. There are two storeys and four bays. The central doorway has an architrave, it is flanked by modern fixed windows, and in the upper floor are sash windows. On the front is a date plaque and a fire insurance plaque.	II
5 and 5A Castlegate; 53.43239°N 1.10918°W	—	Early to mid 18th century	A brick shop with bands, a modillion eaves cornice, and a pantile roof. There are two storeys and two bays. In the ground floor are a doorway and bowed shop windows, and the upper floor contains sash windows.	II
Mill Farm House; 53.42798°N 1.10972°W	—	Early to mid 18th century	A stone house with quoins, a band, a moulded eaves cornice, and a pantile roof with coped gables and cut kneelers. There are two storeys and three bays. The doorway has a moulded architrave, a deep frieze, and a moulded cornice, and the windows are sashes.	II
Folds Cottage; 53.40959°N 1.13431°W	—	1750	A house in magnesian limestone on a plinth, with a rusticated ground floor, bands, and a cornice and blocking course to hipped roofs of Westmorland and Welsh slate and pantile. There are two storeys, a T-shaped plan, and three bays, flanked by single-storey single-bay pavilions. The central doorway has a modillion cornice, and in the outer bays are flat-arched windows with architraves, pulvinated friezes, voussoirs, and cornices. In the centre of the upper floor is an Ionic Venetian window with pilasters and a pulvinated frieze. The pavilions have rusticated quoins and semi-domed niches with keystones.	II
3 Castlegate; 53.43243°N 1.10919°W	—	18th century	A rendered shop with a pantile roof. There are two storeys and one bay. In the ground floor is a shop front, and the upper floor contains a sash window.	II
13, 15 and 17 Castlegate; 53.43194°N 1.10909°W	—	18th century	A row of cottages in rendered stone with pantile roofs. There are two storeys and six bays. On the front are doorways, one to a passageway, and sash windows.	II
16 Castlegate; 53.43177°N 1.10937°W	—	18th century	A house later used for other purposes, it is in stone with a pantile roof. There are two storeys and three bays. In the ground floor is a 19th-century shop front with pilasters and a moulded cornice. To its right is a doorway and a sash window, and the windows in the upper floor are sashes.	II
18 and 20 Castlegate; 53.43166°N 1.10936°W	—	18th century	A cottage and a shop in limestone with pantile roofs. There are two storeys, the cottage on the right has one bay, and the shop has two. In the cottage the windows are sashes, and in the shop they are casements.	II
33 and 35 Castlegate; 53.43100°N 1.10909°W	—	18th century	A pair of stone cottages that have a pantile roof and coped gables. There are two storeys and three bays. In the right two bays are bay windows flanking a doorway, over which is a canopy with a pantile roof, and the other windows are casements.	II
6 Church Lane; 53.43060°N 1.11141°W		18th century	A house in brown brick on a plinth at the end of a row, with a floor band, a modillion eaves cornice, and a pantile roof. There are two storeys and two bays. In the ground floor is a canted bay window with a modern window to its left, and the upper floor contains sash windows.	II
126 Doncaster Road; 53.43905°N 1.11155°W	—	18th century	A roughcast house with quoins, and pantile roofs with coped gables on cut kneelers. There are two storeys, a front of two bays, a three-bay rear wing, and a later stable extension. The windows on the front are sashes, and in the rear wing they are mullioned casements.	II
Stable south of 126 Doncaster Road; 53.43893°N 1.11142°W	—	18th century	The stable is in stone with quoins and a pantile roof. There are two storeys, and it contains a doorway and two windows on the ground floor, and a loading door in the upper floor.	II
128 Doncaster Road; 53.43913°N 1.11144°W	—	18th century	The house is rendered, and has a pantile roof, three storeys and two bays. The doorway in the left bay has a moulded architrave, a pulvinated frieze, and a moulded cornice, and the windows are sashes.	II
9 and 10 Market Place; 53.43297°N 1.10966°W	—	18th century	A stuccoed shop with rusticated quoins and a pantile roof. There are two storeys and three bays. In the ground floor is a modern shop front, and the upper floor contains sash windows.	II
13 Market Place; 53.43278°N 1.10958°W	—	Mid 18th century	A rendered shop with floor bands and a pantile roof. There are three storeys and two bays. In the ground floor is a late 19th-century shop front with a bracketed and moulded cornice. To its left is a sash window and a doorway, and the other windows are casements.	II
16 and 16A Market Place; 53.43263°N 1.10957°W	—	18th century or earlier	A stuccoed shop with a pantile roof, two storeys and two bays. In the ground floor is a shop front with a cornice, to its left is a small doorway, and the upper floor contains sash windows.	II
18 Market Place; 53.43236°N 1.10945°W	—	18th century	A house in magnesian limestone with a pantile roof. There are two storeys and two bays. In the ground floor are two doorways, and the windows are sashes.	II
15 and 17 Northgate; 53.43471°N 1.11019°W	—	18th century or earlier	A pair of roughcast houses that have a pantile roof with coped gables and a cut kneeler. There are two storeys, five bays, and a rear wing with a timber framed core. The openings in the ground floor are modern, and the upper floor contains sash windows.	II
23 and 25 Northgate; 53.43518°N 1.11046°W	—	18th century	A pair of stone houses that have a pantile roof with coped gables and cut kneelers. There are two storeys and three bays, and the windows are sashes in architraves.	II
26, 28 and 30 Northgate; 53.43475°N 1.11061°W	—	Mid 18th century	A row of three cottages on a plinth with a sprocketed pantile roof. There are two storeys and six bays. On the front are three doorways, the middle one with a moulded architrave, and the windows are sashes.	II
27 Northgate; 53.43537°N 1.11054°W	—	18th century	A stone house with stone slate eaves and a pantile roof. There are two storeys, two bays, and a single-storey single-bay extension on the right. The doorway has a plain surround, and the windows are 19th-century casements in architraves.	II
60 Northgate; 53.43587°N 1.11103°W	—	18th century or earlier	A stone house with some possible internal timber framing, quoins, and a pantile roof. There are two storeys, two bays on the front, and a three-bay rear wing. The near-central doorway has a plain surround, the windows on the front are casements, and in the rear wing they are sashes in moulded frames. In the courtyard at the rear is a pump dated 1831.	II
74 and 76 Northgate; 53.43638°N 1.11117°W	—	18th century	A pair of stone houses with a brick modillion cornice and a pantile roof. There are two storeys and three bays. The doorway has a plain surround, and the windows are a mix of sashes, some horizontally-sliding, and casements.	II
78 and 80 Northgate; 53.43649°N 1.11118°W	—	18th century	A stone cottage with a pantile roof, two storeys and two bays. The doorway has a plain surround, and the windows are sashes, some horizontally-sliding.	II
6 Sunderland Street; 53.43291°N 1.10797°W		18th century	A house, later shops, it is in brown brick, with bands, and a pantile roof with stone gable copings on long cut kneelers. There are three storeys and three bays. In the ground floor is a modern shop front, and to the right is a 19th-century shop front with panelled Composite pilasters, and modillion cornices on paired brackets. The upper floors contain sash windows with keystones.	II
22 Sunderland Street; 53.43285°N 1.10740°W	—	18th century	A roughcast house that has a pantile roof with a coped gable on cut kneelers on the left. There are two storeys and two bays. The central doorway has fluted pilasters, a decorated lintel, and a triangular pediment on scrolled consoles. The windows are casements, and above the door is a decorated plaque.	II
23 Sunderland Street; 53.43260°N 1.10730°W	—	18th century	A house, partly used for other purposes, it is stuccoed and has a pantile roof. There are two storeys and four bays. In the right bay is a modern shop front, and to its left is a round-headed passage entry. Further to the left is a doorway, and elsewhere are sash windows.	II
40 Sunderland Street; 53.43271°N 1.10550°W	—	18th century	The house is rendered, and has a pantile roof with stone coped gables on cut kneelers. There are three storeys, three bays, and a two-storey rear wing. The doorway in the right bay has pilasters, and a triangular pediment on scrolled consoles, and the windows are sashes.	II
46 Sunderland Street; 53.43273°N 1.10516°W	—	18th century	The house is in brown brick, and has a pantile roof, hipped on the right. There are three storeys and three bays, and a two-storey, single-bay extension on the right. The doorway has a rectangular fanlight, the windows are sashes with moulded surrounds, and in the extension is a segmental-headed carriage entrance with a keystone.	II
60 Sunderland Street; 53.43246°N 1.10029°W	—	18th century	A house in magnesian limestone, with quoins, and a pantile roof with stone coped gables on cut kneelers. There are two storeys and three bays. The central doorway has a plain surround, above it is a single-light window, and the other windows are sashes.	II
137 Sunderland Street; 53.43257°N 1.09673°W	—	18th century	A house in stone with some brown brick, stone quoins, and a slate roof with coped gables on cut kneelers. There are two storeys and an attic, three bays, a two-storey rear wing, and a rear outshut with a catslide roof. The doorway has a rectangular fanlight, and the windows are sashes.	II
2 Westgate; 53.42995°N 1.11133°W	—	18th century	A limestone cottage with quoins and a pantile roof. There are two storeys and two bays. The doorway is to the left, and the windows are sashes.	II
12 Westgate; 53.42993°N 1.11199°W	—	18th century	A limestone house that has a pantile roof with coped gables on cut kneelers. There are two storeys and two bays. The windows are modern.	II
Castle Folds Farmhouse; 53.43032°N 1.10895°W	—	18th century	The farmhouse is in stone and has a pantile roof with coped gables on cut kneelers. There are two storeys and two bays. The doorway has a chamfered surround, and the windows have been altered.	II
Eastfield Farm Shop and range 53.44154°N 1.10697°W	—	18th century	An L-shaped range of barns, later used for other purposes, they are in stone, with a sprocketed pantile roof, and two storeys. The longer range is about 65 yards (59 m) long, most of the openings have been replaced, and include a re-used 17th-century window with a moulded surround, and with its mullion missing.	II
Northgate House; 53.43696°N 1.11123°W	—	18th century	The oldest part of the house is the south wing, with the main block dating from the mid 19th century. The wing is rendered, with quoins, and a pantile roof. There are two storeys and one bay, and the windows are horizontally-sliding sashes. The later block is taller, with paired eaves brackets, and a slate roof. There are two storeys and three bays, a central doorway with a rectangular fanlight, and sash windows with wedge lintels grooved as voussoirs.	II
Former Post Office; 53.43264°N 1.10752°W	—	18th century	The post office, later used for other purposes, is rendered, with a moulded eaves cornice, and a pantile roof with coped gables and cut kneelers, There are three storeys and three bays. The central doorway has a moulded surround, a pulvinated frieze and a pediment, and the windows are sashes.	II
Former Red Lion Hotel; 53.43254°N 1.10958°W	—	18th century	The former public house, later used for other purposes, is stuccoed with floor bands, a brick eaves cornice, and slate roof. There are three storeys and three bays. In the left bay is a carriage entrance, and the windows are sashes. To the left is a two-storey two-bay extension in painted brick, with a modillion eaves cornice, and sash windows with keystones.	II
Rockhouse; 53.42964°N 1.11663°W	—	18th century	The house, which was extended to the west in the early 19th century, is in magnesian limestone and has a pantile roof. There are two storeys, and the original part and the extension each have two bays. The windows are modern.	II
Rolan Bridge; 53.42908°N 1.11158°W		18th century or earlier	The bridge, also known as Rowland's Bridge, carries a track over Paper Mill Dike. It consists of a clapper arch in magnesian limestone with a span of about 5 feet (1.5 m), and two segmental arches in brown brick at the north end.	II
Sandrock Farm Cottage; 53.43276°N 1.08105°W	—	18th century	A house in brown brick, with a band, a modillion eaves cornice, and a tile roof. There are two storeys and three bays, and the windows are modern casements.	II
Stable behind the Carpenters Arms; 53.43011°N 1.11055°W	—	18th century	The stable is in magnesian limestone, with the top floor in red brick, and a corrugated iron roof with stone coped gables and cut kneelers. There are three storeys, and the building contains two doors, two blocked windows in the middle floor, and stone slate shelves on the east gable end.	II
Sunderland Lodge; 53.43223°N 1.09996°W	—	18th century	The house is roughcast and has a hipped pantile roof. There are two storeys and four bays. The windows are sashes.	II
Tickhill Mill; 53.42816°N 1.10994°W	—	18th century	The mill, which was extended in the 19th century, is in stone with a pantile roof. There are two storeys and basements, two gabled parts, one with two bays, and the other with one, and a lean-to on the east side. The mill contains various doorways and windows.	II
Westfield House; 53.42972°N 1.11354°W	—	Mid 18th century	A stone house with rusticated quoins and a slate roof. There are two storeys and three bays. Above the doorway is a cornice, the windows are sashes with wedge lintels, and those in the upper floor have wrought iron balconies. At the rear is a pump dated 1856 and a monolithic stone trough.	II
Westgate House; 53.42944°N 1.11190°W	—	18th century	The house is stuccoed, and has bands, a modillion eaves cornice, and a pantile roof with coped gables. There are three storeys, three bays, and a single-bay extension to the northwest. On the garden front are two two-storey canted bay windows, and the other windows are sashes. The doorway has moulded jambs, a semicircular fanlight, and a moulded cornice.	II
Limpool Farmhouse; 53.44590°N 1.07712°W	—	Mid to late 18th century	The farmhouse is in red brick with stone dressings, a floor band, dentilled eaves, a moulded cornice, and tile roof with coped gables on shaped kneelers. There are two storeys and an attic and five bays, a three-storey two-bay rear wing, an outshut, and a stair wing in the angle. The doorway has an architrave, a fanlight, a pulvinated frieze, a central panel, and a cornice on consoles, and the windows are casements.	II
14 and 15 Market Place; 53.43270°N 1.10962°W	—	Late 18th century	A red brick shop with an eaves cornice, and a pantile roof with coped gables on cut kneelers. There are three storeys and three bays. In the ground floor is a late 19th-century shop front with panelled pilasters, to its left is a passageway, and to its right is a doorway converted into a window. The upper floors contain sash windows with keystones.	II
Darfield House; 53.43324°N 1.10916°W		Late 18th century	A stone house with a sill band, and a pantile roof with coped gables and kneelers. There are three storeys and three bays. The windows are sashes.	II
Estate House; 53.43318°N 1.10977°W	—	Late 18th century	The building is in red brick with stone dressings, on a stone plinth, with a floor band, and a pantile roof with the pedimented gable end facing the road. There are two storeys and a front of two bays. The ground floor windows have round arches with impost bands, and are set in recessed round arches. In the upper floor are sash windows, and the tympanum of the pediment contains an oculus.	II
Folds Farm House; 53.40916°N 1.13319°W	—	Late 18th century	The older part of the farmhouse is the rear, with the front dating from the mid 19th century. The rear is in stone and has red brick voussoirs, the front is in red brick with stucco voussoirs, and the roof is pantiled with coped gables and cut kneelers. There are two storeys and three bays, with a northwest extension. The windows are sashes.	II
Sunderland House and Cottage; 53.43251°N 1.10088°W	—	Late 18th century	A house, later divided, it has a plinth, and is in magnesian limestone, the south and west front stuccoed, with rusticated quoins, a moulded eaves cornice and blocking course, and a hipped slate roof. There are two storeys, the east front has five bays, with a pediment on scrolled consoles over the middle three bays, and an arched two-storey recess in the centre. The doorway has a moulded architrave, a rectangular fanlight, and a moulded cornice. On the west front is a porch with Ionic columns and an entablature. The windows are sashes.	II
Barn, Wellingley Grange Farm; 53.45934°N 1.10620°W	—	Late 18th century (probable)	The barn is in magnesian limestone, the right return rebuilt in brick, with a stone slate eaves course, and a hipped pantile roof. There are two storeys and eight or nine bays. The barn contains a large segmental-headed wagon entry, hatches with segmental brick arches, slit vents, and altered openings.	II
Market Cross; 53.43301°N 1.10923°W		1777	The market cross is in stone, and consists of a rotunda on four circular steps. There are eight Doric columns, and a saucer dome surmounted by a decorative wrought iron weathervane.	II
1 and 1A Castlegate; 53.43252°N 1.10922°W		Late 18th to early 19th century	A pair of shops in limestone with a pantile roof. There are three storeys and four bays. In the right bay is a segmental-arched carriage entrance, and the other bays contain shop fronts. The middle floor has sash windows, and in the top floor the windows are casements.	II
7 Castlegate; 53.43228°N 1.10919°W	—	18th to early 19th century	A shop in red brick with a pantile roof, three storeys, and a symmetrical front of three bays. In the centre is a doorway with a pediment, and this is flanked by 19th-century shop fronts with panelled pilasters. The upper floors contain segmental-headed sash windows.	II
9 Castlegate; 53.43219°N 1.10915°W	—	18th to early 19th century	A red brick house with a pantile roof, two storeys and two bays. In the ground floor is a doorway with a rectangular fanlight, and to the right is a segmental-headed sash window. The upper floor contains two sash windows with flat heads.	II
39 and 41 Castlegate; 53.43083°N 1.10915°W	—	18th to 19th century	A pair of mirror-image stone cottages with a pantile roof. There are two storeys, and each cottage has one bay. The doorways are in the centre, and have plain raised chamfered surrounds, and the windows are casements.	II
17 Market Place; 53.43242°N 1.10949°W	—	Late 18th to early 19th century	A shop in painted brick with a modillion eaves cornice and a slate roof. There are two storeys and two bays. In the ground floor is a 19th-century shop window with moulded panelled pilasters and a moulded cornice, and to the right is a doorway with a chamfered surround and a keystone. The upper floor contains sash windows with keystones.	II
48 Northgate; 53.43557°N 1.11094°W	—	Late 18th to early 19th century	A red brick house with a pantile roof, two storeys and two bays. There are two doorways and the windows are sashes. All the openings apart from the right doorway and the window to its left have segmental heads.	II
50 Northgate; 53.43569°N 1.11097°W	—	Late 18th to early 19th century	The house is in stone and has a pantile roof. There are two storeys and two bays, and the windows are sashes.	II
52 and 54 Northgate; 53.43576°N 1.11099°W	—	Late 18th to early 19th century	A pair of red brick houses with a slate roof, two storeys and two bays. The doorways are in the centre, and the windows are sashes, all with segmental heads.	II
14 Westgate; 53.42995°N 1.11220°W	—	Late 18th to early 19th century	A house in red brick that has a pantile roof with coped gables. There are two storeys and three bays. The doorway has a moulded architrave, a rectangular fanlight, and a cornice, and the windows are sashes.	II
Barn, Castle Farm; 53.42807°N 1.10908°W	—	18th to early 19th century	A stone barn that has a pantile roof with coped gables on cut kneelers. There are two storeys, and the barn contains a doorway, windows, and a loft door.	II
Castle Farm Cottage; 53.42825°N 1.10929°W	—	18th to early 19th century	The house is in stone and has a pantile roof with coped gables on cut kneelers. There are two storeys and three bays. The central doorway has a fanlight, above it is a blind window, and the other windows are modern; all the openings have segmental heads.	II
Limestone Hill Farmhouse; 53.42819°N 1.12967°W	—	18th to early 19th century	The farmhouse is in red brick, and has a pantile roof with coped gables on cut kneelers. There are two storeys and three bays, and an extension to the north in magnesian limestone. On the front is a porch with a Tuscan surround and a moulded cornice. There are two canted bay windows, and the other windows are sashes.	II
Manor House; 53.43415°N 1.10993°W	—	18th to early 19th century	The house is roughcast, with quoins, stone slate eaves, and a hipped pantile roof. There are two storeys and three bays, and an L-shaped wing at the rear. The central doorway has a rectangular fanlight in a moulded surround, and a moulded cornice. This flanked by canted bay windows with Tuscan piers and moulded cornices, and in the upper floor are sash windows. The rear wing contains bow windows, carriage doors, and a loading door in the upper floor.	II
Barn by 126 Doncaster Road; 53.43887°N 1.11208°W	—	1820	The barn is in stone with stone slate eaves and a pantile roof. It contains doorways with elliptical heads, and six rows of slit vents.	II
56 Castlegate; 53.43054°N 1.10963°W	—	Early 19th century	The house is in brown brick with a pantile roof, two storeys and two bays. The doorway and the windows, which are casements, have segmental heads.	II
Ancillary building, Dam Road; 53.42914°N 1.11143°W		Early 19th century	Possibly originally a boathouse, the building is in brown brick with magnesian limestone dressings and a pantile roof. The front facing the dike has two storeys and an attic, and two bays. In the ground floor are two blocked arches with voussoirs and keystones. The upper floor contains modern windows, and at the top is a pedimented gable with a round-headed window in the tympanum.	II
3–6 Market Place; 53.43313°N 1.10970°W	—	Early 19th century	A shop in colour-washed brick with a floor band and a slate roof. There are three storeys and four bays. In the ground floor is a modern shop front. In the upper floors, the first bay contains round-headed recesses, and in the third bay are flat-headed recesses; the other bays contain sash windows.	II
8 Market Place; 53.43305°N 1.10968°W	—	Early 19th century	A shop in stone with a slate roof, three storeys and one bay. In the ground floor is a 19th-century shop front, and the upper floors contain sash windows.	II
6. 8 and 10 Northgate; 53.43377°N 1.11011°W	—	Early 19th century	A row of rendered cottages with a pantile roof, later used for other purposes. There are two storeys and three bays. The windows are sashes, and the doors are modern in the original openings.	II
12 Northgate; 53.43389°N 1.11018°W	—	Early 19th century	A house, later used for other purposes, it is in stone with a slate roof. There are two storeys and two bays. The central doorway has a rectangular fanlight, and the windows are sashes.	II
24 Pinfold Lane; 53.43062°N 1.11648°W	—	Early 19th century	A stone house at right angles to the road, with a pantile roof, two storeys and three bays. Above the central doorway is a blind window. The windows in the ground floor are sashes, and in the upper floor are casement windows with pointed arches and intersecting tracery.	II
3 Sunderland Street; 53.43280°N 1.10878°W		Early 19th century	A stuccoed house, later used for other purposes, with a pantile roof. There are three storeys and four bays. Steps lead up to a doorway with a semicircular fanlight and a moulded cornice in the second bay, and above it are blind panels. The first and third bays contain sash windows, and in the fourth bay is a small doorway with blind panels above.	II
89 Sunderland Street; 53.43213°N 1.10117°W	—	Early 19th century	A stone house with quoins and a slate roof. There are two storeys and three bays. The central doorway has a fanlight, and the windows are sashes, the window above the doorway converted with an inserted oculus. All the openings have segmental heads.	II
10 Westgate; 53.42993°N 1.11180°W	—	Early 19th century	A house in limestone with a pantile roof. There are two storeys and three bays. On the right is a doorway, and the windows in the ground floor have segmental heads.	II
23 Westgate; 53.42975°N 1.11227°W	—	Early 19th century	The house is in magnesian limestone, with sill bands, and a pyramidal pantile roof. There are three storeys and three bays. The windows are sashes with segmental heads, and the doorway in the right return has a semicircular fanlight, and a moulded and dentilled cornice on scrolled consoles.	II
85 and 87 Westgate; 53.42961°N 1.11524°W	—	Early 19th century	A roughcast house with a pantile roof. There are two storeys and two bays. The doorway has a triangular lintel, and the windows are sashes.	II
Brook House; 53.42865°N 1.11506°W	—	Early 19th century	A stuccoed house with overhanging eaves and a hipped slate roof. There are two storeys and two bays. On the south garden front are two bay windows, and on the north front are two windows with pointed heads and intersecting tracery.	II
Garden house, Brook House; 53.42907°N 1.11503°W	—	Early 19th century	The building at the end of the garden is in red brick, and has a coped embattled parapet. There is one storey, and the building contains a doorway with a pointed arch, a hood mould, and a latticed door.	II
Garden wall, Brook House; 53.42885°N 1.11487°W	—	Early 19th century	The wall runs along the east side of the garden, then along the north side of Paper Mill Dike. It is in coped stone, and at the north end it is ramped upwards in four curved steps.	II
Carlton House; 53.43282°N 1.10711°W	—	Early 19th century	The house is in magnesian limestone on a plinth, with a slate roof, two storeys and three bays. The central doorway has panelled pilasters, a moulded surround, a rectangular fanlight, a fluted frieze, and a moulded cornice.	II
Cuckoo Hall; 53.41730°N 1.12816°W	—	Early 19th century	A stone house with a pantile roof, two storeys and two bays. The central doorway has a rectangular fanlight, the windows are sash window, and all the openings have wedge lintels grooved to resemble voussoirs.	II
Barn, range and cowshed, Folds Farm; 53.40918°N 1.13266°W	—	Early 19th century	The farm buildings are in stone with quoins, and a pantile roof with coped gables on cut kneelers. The barn is long, and contains a door with a four-centred arch, the range is at right angles, it has two storeys, and contains three stable doors, a loading door and other openings, and the cowshed is open on the north side, and has a hipped roof.	II
Gospel Hall; 53.43254°N 1.10688°W	—	Early 19th century	The hall is in stone with a pantile roof, one storey and three bays. In the north front are three sash windows with segmental heads, and the west front contains a doorway with a stuccoed rusticated surround.	II
Methodist Chapel; 53.43421°N 1.11073°W	—	Early 19th century	The chapel is in stone on a plinth, with a modern roof, one storey and three bays, the middle bay slightly projecting. The front is gabled with a band at eaves level. In the centre is a gabled porch containing double doors with a semicircular fanlight, moulded jambs, voussoirs, imposts, and a keystone. The outer bays contain windows with round-arched heads.	II
Milestone; 53.43005°N 1.11020°W		Early 19th century (possible)	The milestone is on the north side of the A60 road between Castlegate and Westgate. It is in millstone grit with cast iron overlay, and has a triangular plan and a rounded top. On the top is inscribed "BAWTRY & TINSLEY ROAD" and "TICKHILL", and on the sides are the distances to Bawtry, Sheffield, Tinsley, and Rotherham.	II
The Garden Cottage; 53.43247°N 1.10604°W	—	Early 19th century (probable)	A stuccoed house with a slate roof, two storeys and three bays. The doorway is in the right bay, and the windows are sashes; the middle window in the upper floor has a wrought iron balcony with spear finials and scrolled brackets.	II
The Garth; 53.42979°N 1.11126°W	—	Early 19th century	A red brick house with a modillion eaves cornice and a pantile roof. There are two storeys and three bays. The central doorway has a rectangular fanlight, and the windows are sashes.	II
The Vicarage; 53.43310°N 1.10829°W	—	Early 19th century	The vicarage is stuccoed, and has a slate roof. There are two storeys, three bays, and a lower rear wing. The windows are sashes, and the doorway in the left return has a fanlight.	II
Tickhill House; 53.43270°N 1.10164°W	—	Early 19th century	A stone house with a hipped slate roof, two storeys, three bays, and a rear wing. The windows are sashes, those in the upper floor with wrought iron balconies that have wavy balusters and scrolled brackets. The doorway in the west front has a fanlight and a moulded cornice.	II
Victoria Cottages; 53.43491°N 1.11193°W		Early 19th century	A terrace of ten stone cottages with a pantile roof. There are two storeys and each cottage has one bay. The terrace contains a round-arched passage entrance, and the doorways and windows are modern.	II
8 Sunderland Street; 53.43289°N 1.10779°W	—	Early to mid 19th century	A house in brown brick on a plinth, with a pantile roof, hipped on the right. There are two storeys and three bays. The doorway in the right bay has a stuccoed frame, with Tuscan pilasters, a rectangular fanlight, a frieze, and a cornice. The windows are sashes.	II
31 Sunderland Street; 53.43249°N 1.10657°W	—	Early to mid 19th century	A stone house on a plinth, with a floor band, a moulded eaves cornice, and a pantile roof. There are two storeys and three bays. In the left bay is an elliptically arched carriage entrance with rusticated jambs and voussoirs. The middle bay contains a doorway with a moulded surround, a fanlight and a moulded cornice. The windows are sshes with wedge lintels grooved to resemble voussoirs.	II
63 Northgate; 53.43644°N 1.11081°W	—	Mid 19th century	A house in red brick with paired eaves brackets and a slate roof. There are two storeys and two bays. The central doorway has a rectangular fanlight, the windows are sashes, and all the openings have wedge lintels grooved to resemble voussoirs.	II
24 Sunderland Street; 53.43285°N 1.10731°W	—	Mid 19th century	A house in brown brick on a plinth, with a pantile roof, two storeys and three bays. The doorway in the right bay has pilasters, a rectangular fanlight, and a moulded cornice on scrolled consoles. The windows are sashes with wedge lintels grooved to resemble voussoirs.	II
Wall and railings, 14 Westgate; 53.42989°N 1.11219°W	—	19th century	The wall at the front of the garden is in red brick with stone coping. The railings are in cast iron, and have spear finials.	II
Chapel, Hesley Hall; 53.45392°N 1.07029°W	—	1891	The chapel attached to the hall is in red brick with stone dressings and a slate roof, and is in Perpendicular style. It consists of a nave and a chancel with an apse in one unit, and a south porch. On the junction of the nave and chancel is a corbelled octagonal bell turret surmounted by a crocketed spirelet with a finial. The porch contains a Tudor arch with carved spandrels and a hood mould, above which is a string course, and an embattled parapet with a carved central panel and a ball finial. At the west end is an apsidal baptistry projection.	II
27 Sunderland Street; 53.43242°N 1.10672°W	—	Unknown	A modern house in which has been re-set a stone relief carving from Roche Abbey. This consists of a shield enclosed by a wreath of leaves and surmounted by three cherubim heads under stone drapery.	II
