= Tickhill Castle =

Castle in South Yorkshire, England

Coordinates: 53.4291°N 1.1081°W

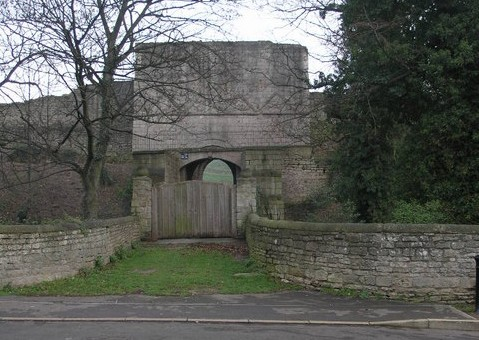
Part of the castle

Tickhill Castle is a castle in Tickhill, in South Yorkshire, England and a prominent stronghold during the reign of King John.

== Early history ==
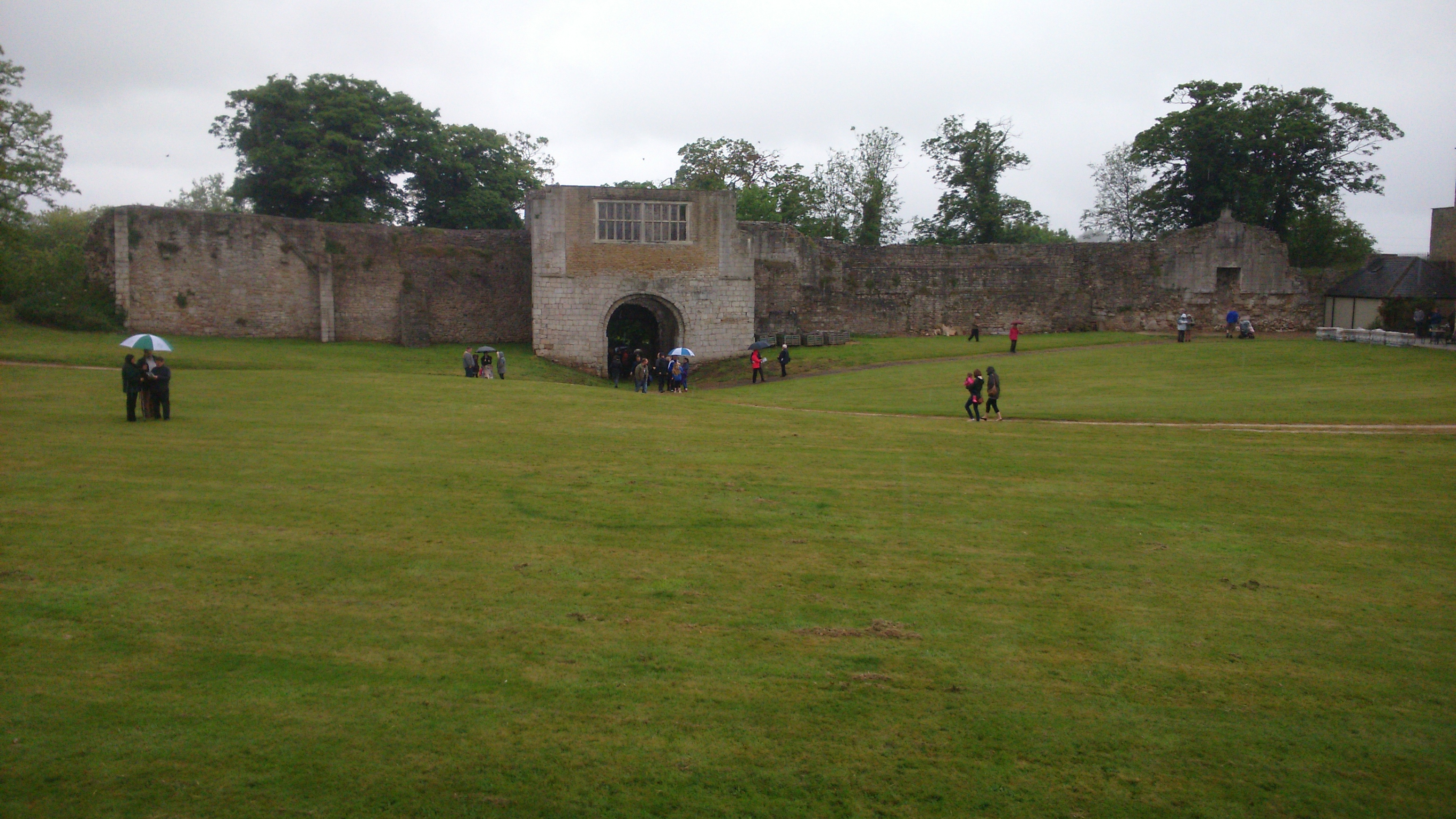
The gatehouse range, seen from the bailey

The castle started as an 11th-century motte-and-bailey earthwork named Blythe Castle, built by Roger de Busli, a major landholder listed in the Domesday Book of 1086 as holding 174 estates in Nottinghamshire, on land granted to him by the Norman king William the Conqueror. The castle was deliberately built on the Nottingham/Yorkshire border, as Roger held authority in both. After a siege in 1102 Robert Bloet added a curtain wall to the rampart around the bailey; the first part of the castle to be built of stone.

From 1151 to 1153, the castle was held by Ranulf de Gernon, 4th Earl of Chester before his death after being poisoned. In 1180 construction began on an 11-sided or circular keep on top of the motte by Henry II of England; it was completed in 1192 along with a stone bridge and a chapel constructed by his wife Eleanor of Aquitaine.

== Possession by John of England ==
In 1189, the land around Tickhill was granted to John of England by his brother Richard I of England, although the castle was withheld by Richard, along with Launceston, Rougemont Castle, Exeter, Gloucester and Nottingham, as Richard did not trust John's loyalty while he participated in the Third Crusade. His fears proved well founded after John seized the kingdom in 1191 from William Longchamp, Richard's chosen regent. Along with Windsor Castle, Tickhill was John's main stronghold to protect against a suspected invasion by Philip II of France.

Tickhill and Nottingham became John's last strongholds under the command of Robert de la Mare, and was besieged by Hugh de Puiset in 1194, with defenders holding out until they heard of the return of Richard to England. After gaining permission from Hugh they sent two knights to find out directly if Richard was indeed returned, and the knights immediately offered to restore the castle to Richard. Richard refused, saying he would only accept an unconditional surrender, which the knights negotiated upon their return, surrendering the castle to Hugh de Puiset in exchange for the defenders' lives.

In 1321, the castle was unsuccessfully laid siege by Thomas, 2nd Earl of Lancaster during a rebellion against Edward II.

In 1343 the exiled Joanna of Flanders, Duchess of Brittany was imprisoned, after being declared insane, at Tickhill, while she and her son were given asylum by Edward III. In 1372, the castle was granted to John of Gaunt by Edward III in exchange for the Earldom of Richmond, which was granted to Johanna's son, John IV, Duke of Brittany. It remains a property of the Duchy of Lancaster to this day.

== English Civil War ==
By 1540, the castle was in poor repair; the lease was obtained in 1612 by Sir Ralph Hansby, who had the castle repaired and fortified. During the English Civil War the castle remained loyal to the crown, with Major Monckton set in charge of the castle after Sir Ralph's death in 1643. In 1644, John Lilburne and 200 dragoons from the Earl of Manchester's army marched to Tickhill, and accepted the castle's surrender on 26 July. The castle was razed in 1648 to prevent its use as a stronghold in the future.

== Present day ==
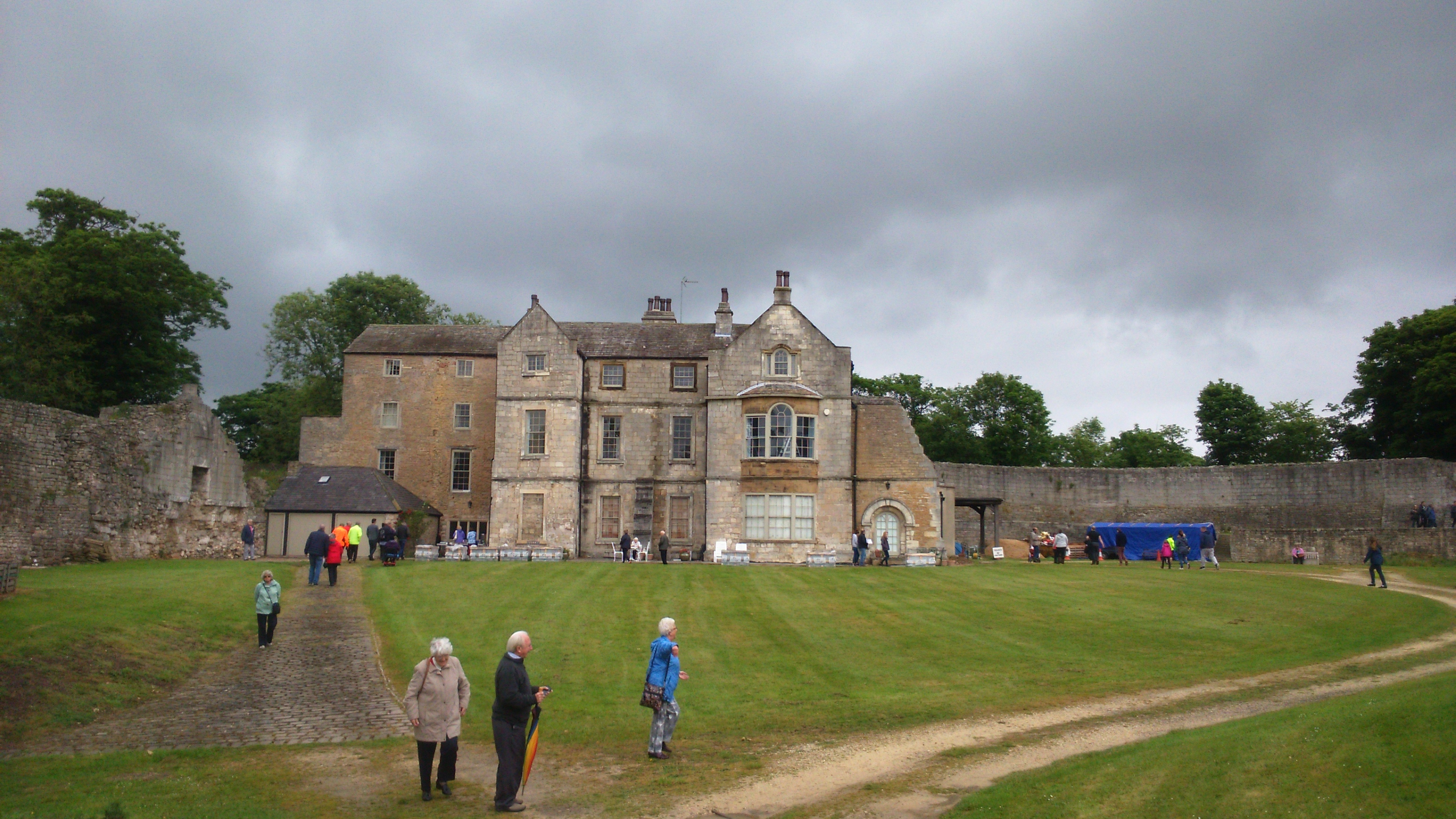
The house

After the Civil War, the Hansby family built a large house, which retains the fortified Norman gatehouse and may incorporate parts of the old hall. The site of the bailey is now part of the gardens. The castle is now a private residence and the monument is maintained by the Duchy of Lancaster, and opened to the public one day a year. Tickhill Castle is open only one day a year on the second Sunday of each June between the hours of 2.00 to 4.00 p.m.

== See also ==
- Listed buildings in Tickhill
