= Odsey =

Hamlet in Cambridgeshire, England

Coordinates: 52.030°N 0.114°W

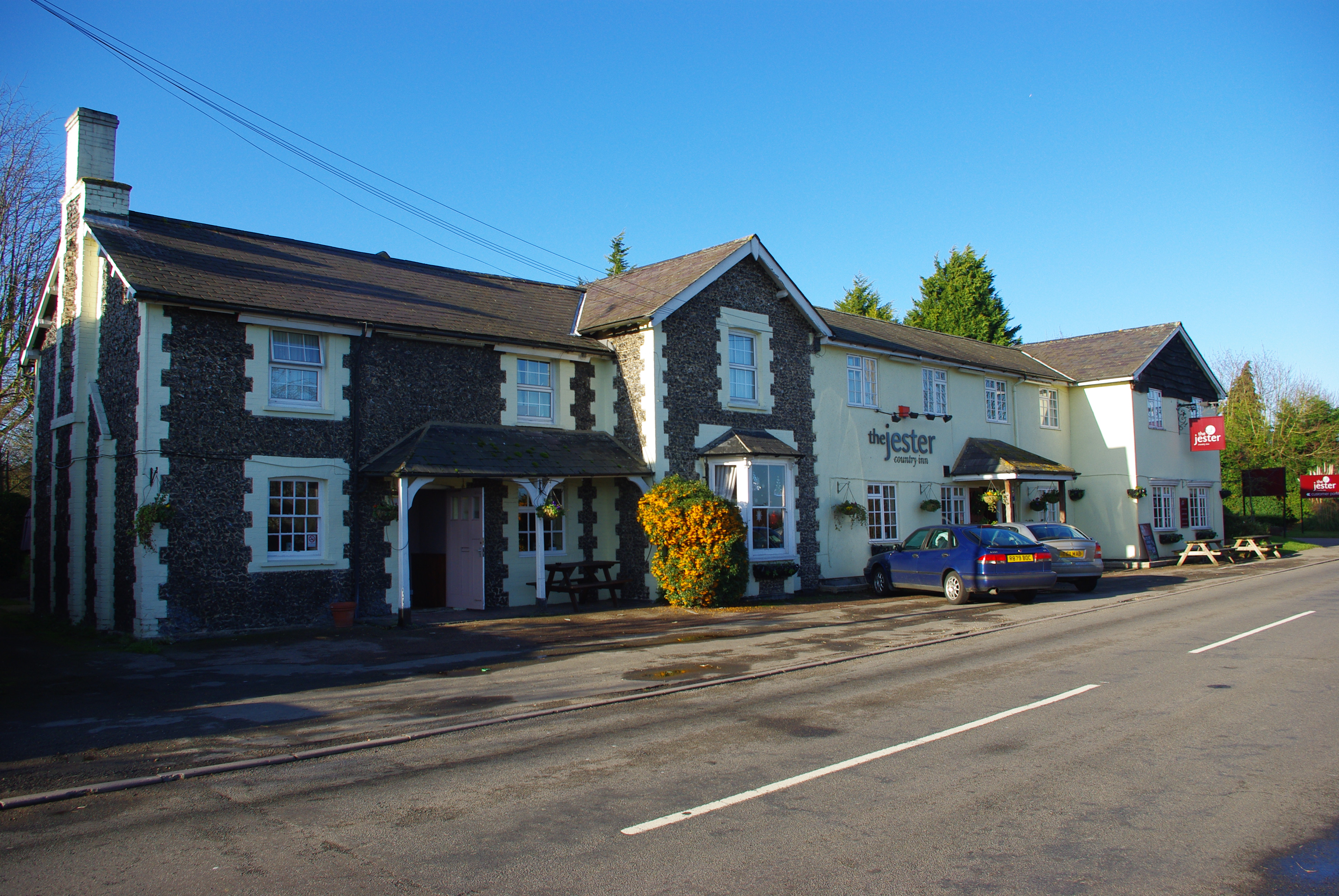
- The Jester public house in 2012

- Location within Cambridgeshire
- OS grid reference: TL295385
- District: South Cambridgeshire
- Shire county: Cambridgeshire
- Region: East
- Country: England
- Sovereign state: United Kingdom
- Post town: BALDOCK
- Postcode district: SG7
- Dialling code: 01462

Odsey is a hamlet in the civil parish of Steeple Morden, Cambridgeshire, England, close to the border with Hertfordshire. It lies just off the A505 road roughly equidistant between Royston and Baldock. It is the location of Ashwell and Morden railway station, which serves the nearby villages of Ashwell, Steeple Morden and Guilden Morden, and offers direct train links to Cambridge and London Kings Cross.

The original "Hundred of Odsey" was named after the hamlet, and the area was important in the past as a stop on the Icknield Way.

A Grade II listed war memorial to those from the local area killed in the First and Second World Wars stands on Station Road, north of the railway station. It is made of Portland stone and is in the form of a Stone of Remembrance thought to be designed by Sir Edwin Lutyens. It was paid for by Sir George Fordham.

In Guilden Morden parish lie Odsey House and its neighbour, Odsey Grange, which form part of a group of listed buildings. Odsey House was built for William Cavendish, 2nd Duke of Devonshire in the early 18th century as a lodge for the Odsey horse races. It is Grade I listed, of three storeys and built of red brick with lighter tones of red and gauged brick dressings. A covered passageway runs north from the house to a single-storey building originally built as a kitchen. A wall with outbuildings connects the kitchen building to an earlier stable block of Odsey Grange. The Grange itself dates from 1705 and was originally the "Jockey house". A coach house and stable range complete the former racing establishment. The Odsey estate was sold by the Cavendish family to brothers Edward and George Fordham in 1793.
