= Tickhill Friary =

Friary in Tickhill, England

Coordinates: 53°25′42.0″N 1°07′10.5″W

Tickhill Friary was an Augustinian friary in Tickhill, South Yorkshire, England. John Clarel, a canon of Southwell, founded it about 1260. It was dissolved in 1530. The remains are a Grade II* listed monument. The 14th century buildings were converted into dwellings in the 17th century, extensions followed in the 19th century. Until 1538, the Fitzwilliam tomb was located in the friary church, but was then moved into the parish church.

== See also ==
- Grade II* listed buildings in South Yorkshire
- Listed buildings in Tickhill
