= James Burbeary =

English cricketer

Personal information
- Full name: James Pashley Burbeary
- Born: c. 1822; Tickhill, West Riding of Yorkshire, England
- Died: 21 July 1866 (aged 44); Sheffield, West Riding of Yorkshire, England
- Batting: Unknown
- Bowling: Unknown

Career statistics
| Competition | First-class |
|---|---|
| Matches | 5 |
| Runs scored | 42 |
| Batting average | 6.00 |
| 100s/50s | –/– |
| Top score | 9 |
| Balls bowled | 20 |
| Wickets | 1 |
| Bowling average | 11.00 |
| 5 wickets in innings | – |
| 10 wickets in match | – |
| Best bowling | 1/11 |
| Catches/stumpings | 1/– |
- Source: Cricinfo, 6 September 2020

James Pashley Burbeary (c. 1822 – 21 July 1866) was an English first-class cricketer and solicitor.

Burbeary was born in the town of Tickhill, West Riding of Yorkshire in 1822. He played first-class cricket for Sheffield (aka Yorkshire) between 1846–52, making five appearances. He scored 42 runs in his five matches, in addition to taking a single wicket. He was by professional a solicitor. In December 1844, he was appointed a master extraordinary to the Court of Chancery by the Lord Chancellor, John Copley, 1st Baron Lyndhurst. Burbeary died at Sheffield on 21 July 1866 from bronchitis.
