= Guilden Morden =

Village in Cambridgeshire, England

Coordinates: 52.081°N 0.133°W

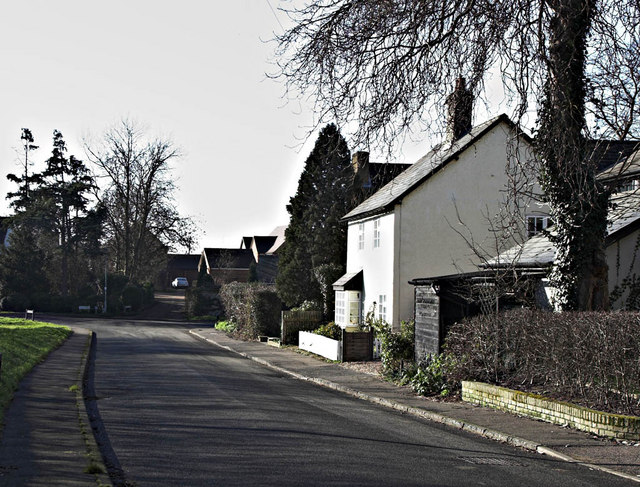
- Church St and High St Guilden Morden

- Location within Cambridgeshire
- Population: 929; 986 (2011 Census)
- OS grid reference: TL279442
- Shire county: Cambridgeshire
- Region: East
- Country: England
- Sovereign state: United Kingdom
- Post town: ROYSTON
- Postcode district: SG8
- Dialling code: 01763

Guilden Morden is a village and parish located in Cambridgeshire about 16 miles (26 km) south west of Cambridge and 9 miles (14 km) west of Royston in Hertfordshire. It is served by the main line Ashwell and Morden railway station 3 miles (5 km) to the south in the neighbouring parish of Steeple Morden.

The parish is combined with the parishes of Abington Pigotts, Guilden Morden and Tadlow to form "The Mordens" ward, which is represented on South Cambridgeshire District Council by one councillor.

== History ==
=== Parish ===
The parish of Guilden Morden is long and thin in shape covering an area of 1,052 hectares (2,600 acres) in the very south-western corner of Cambridgeshire. The parish's long western border largely follows the course of the River Cam from the point where it rises at Ruddery Spring, and which separates it from Hertfordshire and Bedfordshire. At its southern tip the parish meets the ancient Icknield Way (now the A505). Most of its long eastern border follows a stream that divides it from neighbouring Steeple Morden, and reaches its short northern border with Tadlow at Tadlow Bridge.

The area has been occupied for at least 2000 years and probably much longer; an axehead dating from 6000 BC has been found in the parish. A significant cemetery dating from Roman times has also been found in the south of the parish, containing at least 180 burials and indicating an important nearby settlement. The Guilden Morden boar, an Anglo-Saxon copper alloy figure of a boar that may have once served as the crest of a helmet, was found around 1864 or 1865 in a grave. The Saxon village was probably built after that of its neighbour Steeple Morden from which it has been separate since at least the Norman Conquest.

The hamlet of Odsey on the Baldock to Royston road was formerly home to a Cistercian grange. A hamlet named Redreth was listed until the 14th century, probably south of the village and perhaps deserted as a result of the Black Death.

The name is derived from the Old English Gylden More Dun, meaning "Golden" (rich or productive) "Moor Hill".

=== Manor ===
The manor here belonged for several centuries to the Hasilden family. Thomas Hasilden (c.1322-1401) had a Royal grant of free warren in his manors of Steeple and Guilden Morden in 1374. He was then resident at Morden Hall, an ancient mansion. He was Comptroller of the household of John of Gaunt, Duke of Lancaster, and was retained for life to serve him in peace or in war. He also held the manor of Soham in Cambridgeshire from the Duke as superior. In July 1381 he was commanded to meet the Duke at Berwick-upon-Tweed with seventy men-at-arms and sixty lances from his estates. He was a Knight of the Shire for Cambridgeshire in 1384 and also served in four other Parliaments. The manor continued in this family until Francis Hasilden, High Sheriff of Cambridgeshire and Huntingdonshire in 1509 (died early in 1522) settled his estates on his only child Frances who conveyed them by her marriage to Sir Robert Peyton, knt., of Iselham.

== Church ==
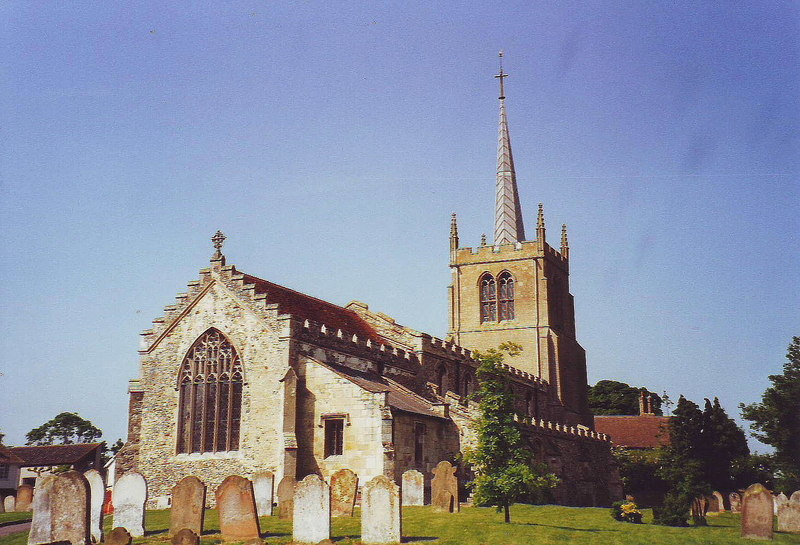
St Mary's Church

The parish church of Guilden Morden has been dedicated to St Mary since at least the 15th century. The oldest parts of the nave date back to the 13th century, with the majority of the building added in the 14th century. The present building consists of a chancel, aisled and clerestoried nave with south porch, and a west tower with a short spire. The tower dates from the 15th century, and the present spire replaced an older one in 1972. The basin of the font is 12th century. In 1522 Francis Hasilden, Lord of the Manor of Guilden Morden, was buried in the north aisle "before Jesus's Altar" in a tomb which cost his estate £20 sterling.

== Village life ==
In the village there are two open public houses; the King Edward VII on Fox Hill Road, and The Three Tuns situated on the High Street. Formerly owned by Greene King and closed in 2013, the latter was purchased by some 300 locals and re-opened in summer 2019 as a community owned Free House.

Former public houses include The Six Bells, which opened next to the church before 1801, closed some time in the 1960s or 70s, and The Black Swan opened on Swan Lane in the late 19th century and closed in the 20th century. The village's other former pubs are The Pear Tree (47 New Road), The Chestnuts, The Pig and Whistle (63 High Street), The Fox, and The Black Horse (Potton Road).

Guilden Morden Primary School, founded in 1847, opened on its current site in 1974. The school has around 120 children from reception to year 6. The children then go on to Bassingbourn Village College in most cases. In addition the village has a pre-school.

A fete is held each September on the recreation ground in aid of the village hall.
