= Tickhill =

Town and civil parish in South Yorkshire, England

Coordinates: 53.43049°N 1.11348°W

- Town and civil parish
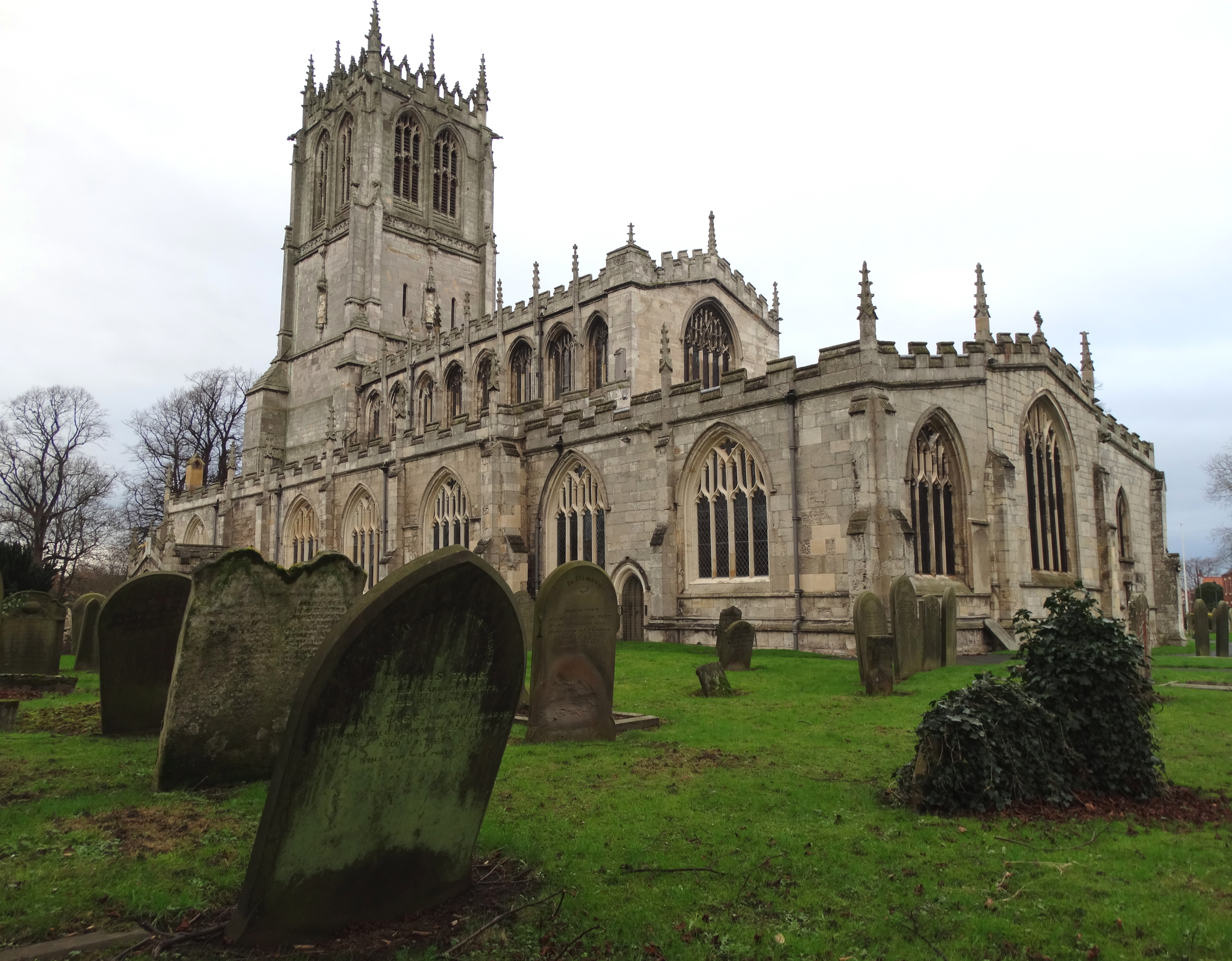
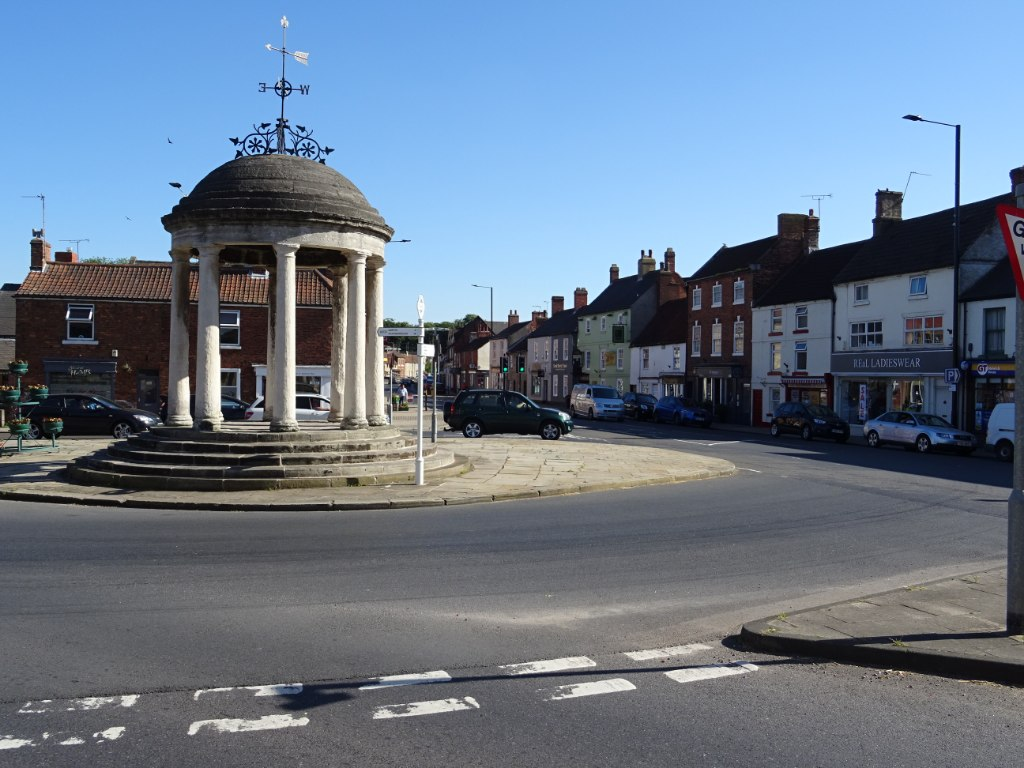
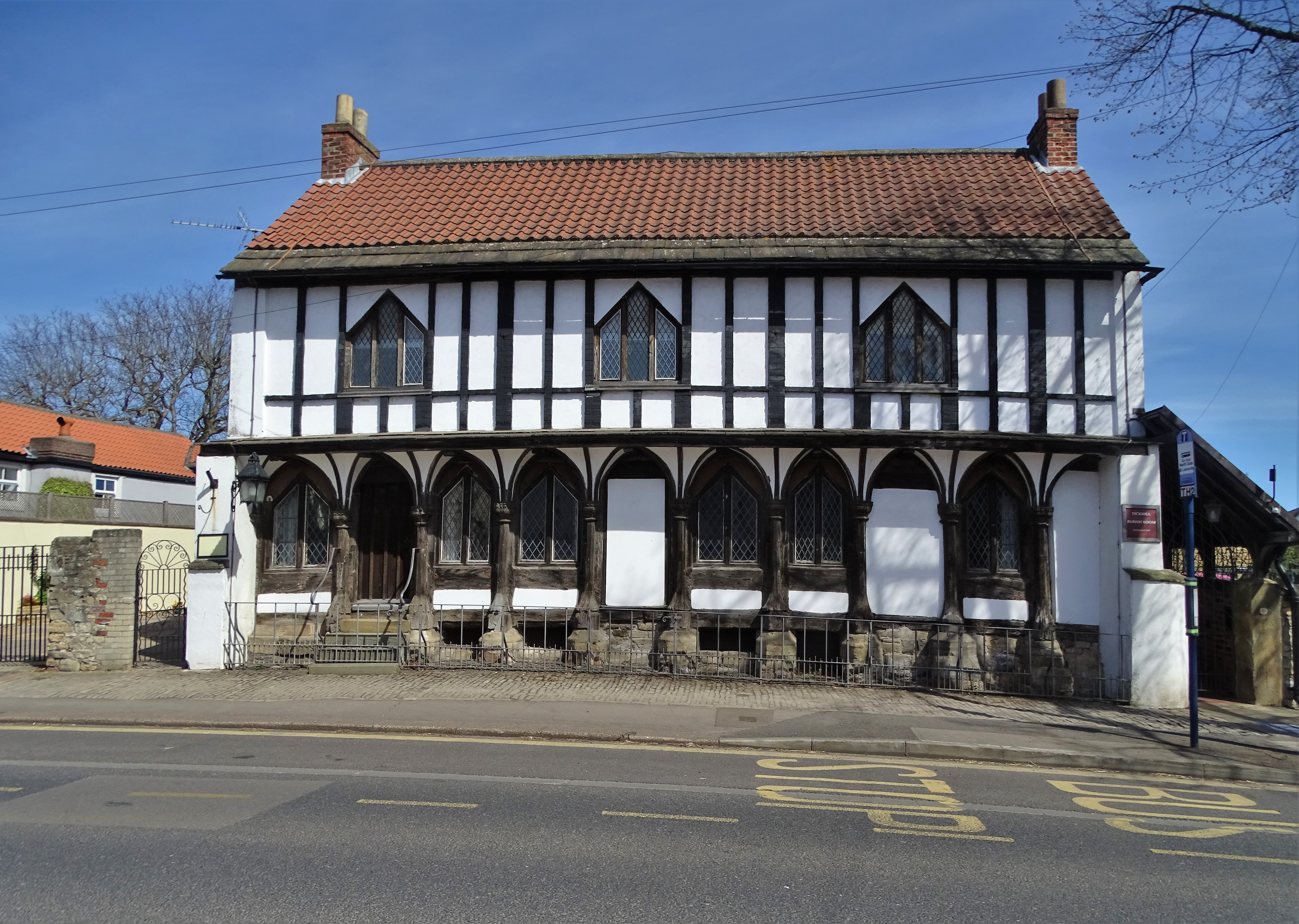
- St Mary's Church Market Cross Parish Rooms

- Location within Borough of Doncaster Location within South Yorkshire
- Area: 10.73 sq mi (27.8 km^{2})
- Population: 5,167 (2021 census)
  - Density: 482/sq mi (186/km^{2})
- OS grid reference: SK592931
- Civil parish: Tickhill
- Metropolitan borough: City of Doncaster
- Metropolitan county: South Yorkshire
- Region: Yorkshire and the Humber
- Country: England
- Sovereign state: United Kingdom
- Post town: Doncaster
- Postcode district: DN11
- Dialling code: 01302
- Police: South Yorkshire
- Fire: South Yorkshire
- Ambulance: Yorkshire
- UK Parliament: Doncaster Central

Tickhill is a market town and civil parish in the City of Doncaster, South Yorkshire, England, close to the border with Nottinghamshire. At the 2021 census, the parish had a population of 5,167.

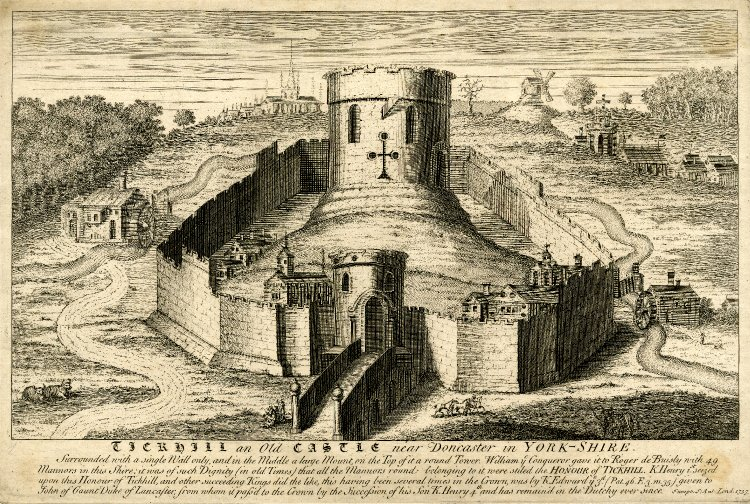
Tickhill an Old Castle near Doncaster in Yorkshire by George Vertue in 1737

== Geography ==
It lies eight miles south of Doncaster, between Maltby and Harworth, on the busy conjunction of the A631 and A60 roads, and adjacent to the A1(M) motorway. It is located at 53° 26' North, 1° 6' 40" West, at an elevation of around 20 metres (66 ft) above sea level. The River Torne passes close to the south-east of the town where it is the boundary between South Yorkshire and Nottinghamshire, eventually meeting the River Trent.

Notable buildings in Tickhill include the substantial ruins of Tickhill Castle which contain a private residence leased by the Duchy of Lancaster, St Mary's Church – a large 13th-century parish church, the parish room, an old hospital called St Leonard's, and the Buttercross.

== Toponymy ==
"Tickhill" is an Old English place-name, meaning either "Hill where young goats are kept" or "Hill of man called Tica". It is composed of one of either ticce ("young goat") or the name Tica, and the word hyll. The village was not recorded in the Domesday Book but was recorded as Tikehill sometime in the 12th century.

== History ==
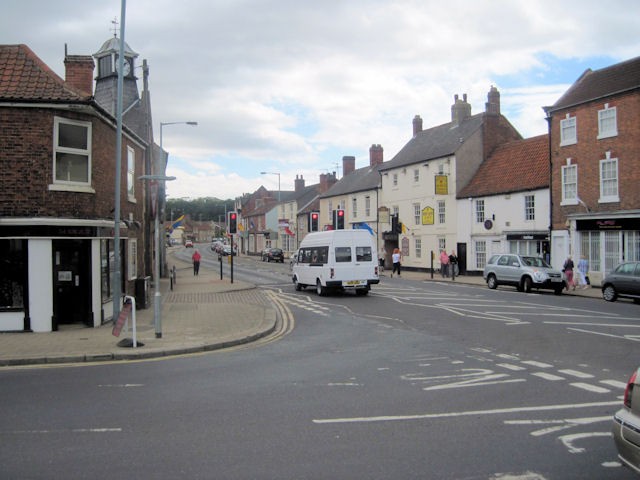
Main Street, Tickhill

=== William I ===
Shortly after the Norman Conquest, William I of England gave the lands around Tickhill to Roger de Busli, who built a castle on a small hill. Richard de Busli, grandson of Roger's brother Arnold, co-founded nearby Roche Abbey with Richard FitzTurgis in 1147.

=== Middle Ages ===
During the Middle Ages, Tickhill was the second most important town, after Doncaster, in what is now South Yorkshire. The Domesday Book lists the settlement under the former estate centre at Dadsley, now lying on the northern edge of the town. Dadsley was served by a church atop All Hallows Hill, which by 1361 had been downgraded to a chapel. Evidence suggests that the chapel was unused after the English Reformation, and was razed in the mid-17th century.

Tickhill's eponymous hill was probably the base of what is now the motte of Tickhill Castle. The town grew up around the castle, and St Mary's was built soon after to replace All Hallows as the settlement's main church.

Initially, Tickhill was one of England's most successful new towns. It gained Tickhill Friary and St Leonard's Hospital. The Guild of St Cross was established in the town, and it is believed to have acted as the settlement's main governing body. In 1295, Tickhill constituency sent two members to Parliament, but did not do so subsequently.

=== Sixteenth century ===
As castles declined in importance during the medieval period, so did Tickhill. By the 16th century, only a hall was occupied on the castle site, but the market and an annual fair on St Lawrence's Day survived. A little trade was gained from its position on the main road to Bawtry. In 1777, a butter cross was erected in the marketplace in an attempt to revive the weekly market, but this ceased in the 1790s.

Strafforth and Tickhill was one of the wapentakes of the West Riding of Yorkshire. The Tickhill Psalter, an outstanding medieval illuminated manuscript was made in the Worksop Priory Nottinghamshire, is currently on display in New York City. It is named after John de Tickhill, born locally and who was made Prior of Worksop in the 14th century.

=== 1900s ===
The Tickhill and Wadworth railway station was open from 1910 to 1929. There has been much debate whether to reopen this station.

== Demographics ==
Census population of Tickhill parish
Census	Population	Female	Male	Households	Source
2001	5,301	2,732	2,569	2,334	
2011	5,228	2,762	2,466	2,398	
2021	5,167	2,711	2,456	2,406	

== Castle ==
Tickhill Castle was built by Roger de Busli, one of the most powerful of the first wave of Norman magnates who had come to England with William the Conqueror. The castle had an eventful history in national life. It was held for the usurping prince John against his brother King Richard I, when the latter returned from abroad in 1194, after his absence on crusade, was the site of a three-week siege during baronial conflicts in 1322. In the civil war of the 1640s, its importance as a local centre of resistance led to its ‘slighting’ (intentional disabling) by Parliament after the defeat of the royalist forces there in 1648. (Conisbrough, long disused as a fortress by this time, escaped such a fate.)

Today, Tickhill castle remains an impressive ruin, retaining its Norman gatehouse, built in 1129–1130, the foundations of the 11-sided keep (one of only two in the world) on a mound 75 feet (23 m) high, built in 1178–9 on the model of the keep at Conisbrough, substantial defensive ditches, some parts of which remain as a moat, and walls enclosing an inner courtyard covering 2 acres (8,100 m^{2}).

== Jubilee Wood ==
In 2002 a new public access wood was planted as a Queen's Jubilee project. 'Jubilee Wood' consists of 2002 native trees in 4 acres of land next to the River Torne, south of Tickhill (OS map reference SK 599917).

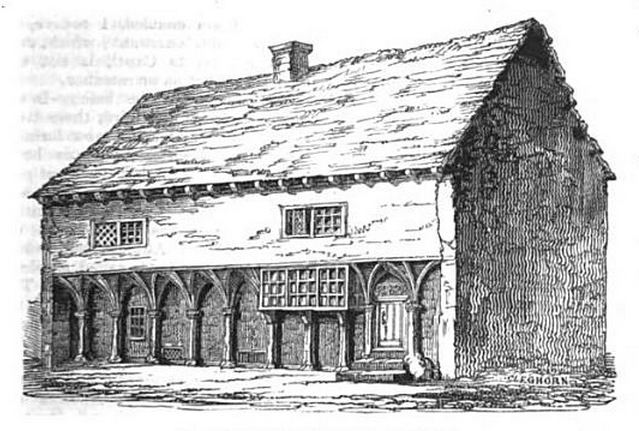
St Leonards Hospital in 1840s

== Flooding ==
Animation showing flood defence wall in Lindrick Avenue, Tickhill

This area along the watercourse makes it prone to flooding, and in 2007 and 2008 flooding occurred leading to the commissioning of a flood defence wall along Lindrick Avenue costing £135,000.

In November 2019, flooding occurred in the same area, eventually bypassing the new flood defence wall.

== Media ==
Local news and television programmes are provided by BBC Yorkshire and ITV Yorkshire (West). Television signals are received from the Emley Moor transmitter. The Belmont TV transmitter can also be received which broadcast BBC Yorkshire and Lincolnshire and ITV Yorkshire (East). Local radio stations are BBC Radio Sheffield, Heart Yorkshire, Capital Yorkshire, Hits Radio South Yorkshire, Sine FM, Greatest Hits Radio South Yorkshire, and TX1 Radio. The town is served by local newspaper, Doncaster Free Press.

== Notable residents ==
- James Burbeary, cricketer
- William de Tickhill, 14th-century civil servant and judge
- Francis Fletcher, late 16th-century Vicar of Tickhill, accompanied Francis Drake on his circumnavigation of the world
- Thomas Milnes, (c. 1810 – 1888), sculptor
- Israel Tonge, informer in the "Popish" plot

== See also ==
- Listed buildings in Tickhill
