= St Mary's Church, Tickhill =

Anglican parish church in Tickhill, South Yorkshire, England

Coordinates: 53.43047°N 1.11047°W

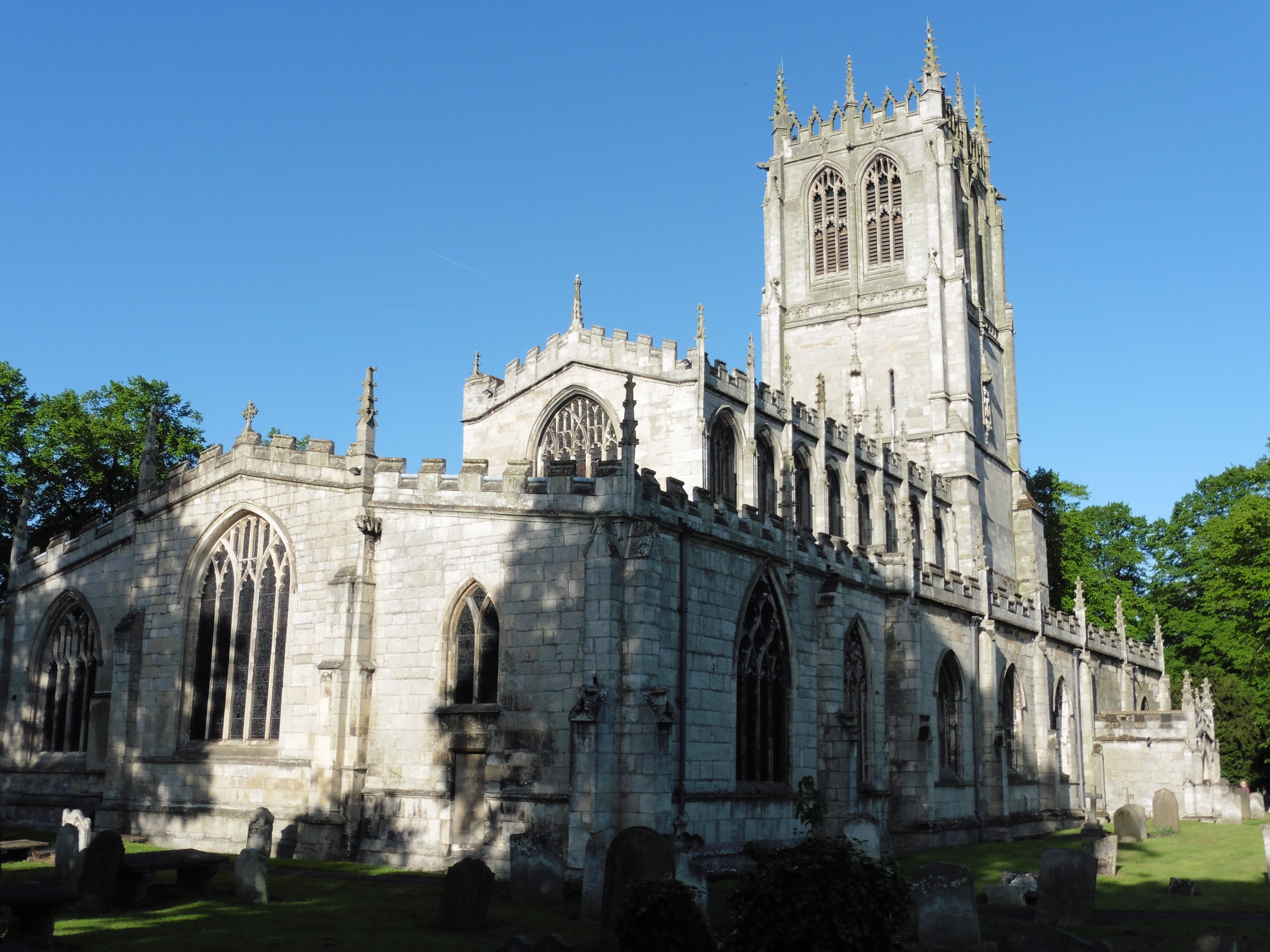
- St Mary's Church, Tickhill
- OS grid reference: SK 59174 93086
- Denomination: Church of England
- Churchmanship: Broad Church

History
- Dedication: St. Mary

Administration
- Province: York
- Diocese: Sheffield
- Parish: Tickhill

St Mary's Church is a Grade I listed Anglican church in Tickhill, South Yorkshire, England. Dating from the early 12th century and built with local Magnesian Limestone the structure today is predominantly of Perpendicular style with glimpses of earlier Norman, Early English and Decorated styles. The large west tower of the church is 128 feet (39 m) high. It is an active place of worship in the Diocese of Sheffield.

== Organ ==
The organ was originally built in 1857 by Charles Brindley (Sheffield). One of his earliest organs, the influence of Edmund Schulze – whom Brindley met at the Great Exhibition of 1851 – is clear notably in the complete Diapason chorus of the Great.

The current organ is the result of several major rebuilds and regular additions. Its most recent additions are the Pedal Double Trumpet 16'; which was added in 2007, and a protective canopy; added in 2010.

== Peal ==
	Diameter	Weight	Weight (modern equivalent)	Date	Founder	Inscription	Notes
Treble	28 1/4"	5 cwt. 0 qr. 10 lb	258.55 kg	1896	John Taylor & Co.	"My voice I'll raise, the Lord to praise"	The gift of Anna Maria Alderson, Tickhill
2nd	29 1/4"	5 cwt. 2 qr. 21 lb	288.94 kg	1896	John Taylor & Co.	"On Earth bells do ring In Heaven angels sing Hallelujah"	The gift of Anna Maria Alderson, Tickhill
3rd	32 1/4"	6 cwt. 2 qr. 18 lb	338.38 kg	1726	Not recorded	"Be light and glad in God rejoice which is our strength and stay"	
4th	33 1/4"	5 cwt. 0 qr. 10 lb	258.55 kg	1726	Not recorded	"Always be joyful and lift up your voice to Jacob's God"	
5th	36 1/4"	7 cwt. 3 qr. 11 lb	398.71 kg	1815	James Harrison of Bacton		
6th	38"	9 cwt. 0 qr. 0 lb	457.22 kg		Not recorded	"Most sweet on every pleasant strings, strike up with Lute ad Harp"	
7th	41 1/4"	11 cwt. 0 qr. 7 lb	562.0 kg	1796	James Harrison of Bacton		
Tenor	44 1/4"	13 cwt. 3 qr. 7 lb	701.71 kg	1726	Not recorded	"Our sounding is eaich man to call to serve the Lord both grait and small"	Tuned to E♭ (flat)
Service Bell	21 1/2"			1727	Not recorded		The gift of Anne Teykhill, widow of Tickhill, daughter and heir of Richard Brownlow of Thrumpton

== See also ==
- Grade I listed buildings in South Yorkshire
- Listed buildings in Tickhill
